= Mario Lanza discography =

- Studio albums: 22
- Extended plays: 27
- Singles: 76

The following is a discography of original albums and singles released by American singer Mario Lanza.

== Singles (78 rpm) ==
- "Be My Love" / "The Loveliest Night of the Year" (RCA Victor 420-0771)

== Singles (45 rpm) ==
=== RCA Victor ===
- 1950: "Be My Love" / "I’ll Never Love You" (RCA Victor, 10-1561)
- ????: "Vesti la giubba" / "Ave Maria" (RCA Victor, 10-3228)
- 1951: "Granada" / "Lolita" (RCA Victor, 12-1192)
- 1962: "O Holy Night" / "The Virgin's Slumber Song" (RCA Victor, 12-1285)

Red Seal

- 1950: "'O sole mio" / "Mattinata" (RCA Victor, 49-0902)
- ????: "Granada" / "Lolita" (RCA Victor, 49-1169)
- ????: "O Holy Night" / "The Virgin's Slumber Song" (RCA Victor Red Seal, 49-1338)
- 1951: "Because" / "For You Alone" (RCA Victor Red Seal, 49-3207)
- 1952: "Because You're Mine" / "The Song Angels Sing" (RCA Victor Red Seal, 49-3914)
- 1953: "Song of India" / "If You Were Mine" (RCA Victor, 49-4209)
- 1954: "Granada" / "Lolita" (RCA Victor, 49-4213)
- 1954: "I'll Walk with God" / "Beloved" (RCA Victor, 49-4210)
- 1954: "Serenade" / "Deep in My Heart, Dear" (RCA Victor, 49-4218)
- 1955: "Ave Maria" / "I'll Walk with God" (RCA Victor, 47-6330)
- 1957: "Be My Love" / "The Loveliest Night of the Year" (RCA Victor, 47-6334)
- 1957: "Never till Now" / "Come Dance with Me" (RCA Victor, 47-7119)
- 1957: "A Night to Remember" / "Behold!" (RCA Victor, 47-6915)
- 1957: "Granada" / "Mamma mia che vo' sape?" (RCA Italiana, N 0618)
- 1957: "Arrivederci Roma" / "The Loveliest Night of the Year" (RCA Italiana, N 0633)
- 1958: "Silent Night" / " The First Noel" (RCA Italiana, N 0698)
- 1958: "Come prima" / "'O sole mio" (RCA Italiana, N 0732)
- 1958: "There's Gonna Be a Party Tonight" / "Imitation Sequence" (RCA, ERA 115)
- 1957: "Behold!" / "A Night to Remember" (RCA, 45RCA 1026)
- 1958: "Seven Hills of Rome" / "Come Dance with Me" (RCA, 45-RCA 1045)
- 1958: "Arrivederci Roma" / "Never till Now" (RCA, 45-RCA 1052)
- 1958: "On the Street Where You Live" / "Younger than Springtime" (RCA, 45-RCA 1059)
- 1958: "Love in a Home" / "Do You Wonder?" (RCA, 45-RCA 1080)
- 1958: "Drinking Song" / "Serenade" (RCA, 45-RCA 1090)
- 1958: "I'll Walk with God" / "The Lord's Prayer" (RCA, RCA 1094)
- 1959: "'O sole mio" / "For the First Time" (RCA, 47-7439)
- 1959: "Guardian Angels" / "I'll Walk with God" (RCA, 47-7622)
- ????: "Granada" / "Lolita" (RCA Victor, 47-9126)
- 1959: "Because" / "Ave Maria" (RCA, RCA 1123)
- 1959: "'O Sole Mio" / "I Love Thee (Ich liebe dich)" (RCA, RCA 1128)
- 1959: "O Come All Ye Faithful" / "Silent Night, Holy Night" (RCA, 45-RCA) 1155
- 1960: "Because You're Mine" / "The Donkey Serenade" (RCA, 45-RCA 1166)
- 1960: "Only a Rose" / "Be My Love" (RCA, RCA 1210)
- ????: "Mamma mia che vo' sape'?" / "Core 'ngrato" (RCA Victor Red Seal, DM 1330)
- 1951: "Begin the Beguine" / "Night and Day" (RCA, 447-0772)
- ????: "Ave Maria" / "The Lord's Prayer" (RCA, 447-0774)
- ????: "Drink, Drink, Drink" / "Giannina mia" (RCA, 447-0775)
- ????: "O Holy Night" / "I'll Walk with God" (RCA, 447-0777)
- ????: "Arrivederci Roma" / "Come prima" (RCA, 447-0853)

=== His Master's Voice ===
- 1950: "Che gelida manina" / "Core 'ngrato" (His Master's Voice, D.B. 21017)
- 1950: "Mattinata" / "Cielo e mar" (His Master's Voice, D.B. 21302)
- 1950: "Lolita" / "Granada" (His Master's Voice, D.B. 21310)
- ????: "Be My Love" / "The Bayou Lullaby" (His Master's Voice, D.A. 1964)
- ????: "I'll Never Love you" / "Tina-Lina" (His Master's Voice, D.A. 1965)
- 1951: "La donna e mobile" / "The Loveliest Night of the Year" (His Master's Voice, D.A. 1978)
- 1951: "Because" / "Ave Maria" (His Master's Voice, D.A. 1982)
- 1951: "E lucevan le stelle" / "Vesti la giubba" (His Master's Voice, D.A. 1983)
- 1951: "Questa o quella" / "Recondita armonia" (His Master's Voice, D.A. 1989)
- 1952: "'A vucchella" / "Marechiare" (His Master's Voice, D.A. 1989)
- ????: "Temptation" / "Lycia" (His Master's Voice, D.A. 2002)
- 1952: "Because You're Mine" / "The Song Angels Sing" (His Master's Voice, D.A. 2017)
- ????: "You Do Something to Me" / "Lee-ah-loo" (His Master's Voice, D.A. 2020)
- ????: "The Lord's Prayer" / "Guardian Angels" (His Master's Voice, D.A. 2024)
- ????: "Song of India" / "If You Were Mine" (His Master's Voice, D.A. 2048)
- 1953: "Call Me a Fool" / "You Are My Love" (His Master's Voice, D.A. 2051)
- 1954: "Beloved" / "I'll Walk with God" (His Master's Voice, D.A. 2062)
- 1954: "Drinking Song" / "Serenade" (His Master's Voice, D.A. 2065)
- ????: "Deep in My Heart, Dear" (with Elizabeth Doubleday) / "Golden Days" (His Master's Voice, D.A. 2066)
- ????: "Summertime in Heidelberg" (with Elizabeth Doubleday) / "Gaudeamus igitur" (His Master's Voice, D.A. 2070)
- ????: "Away in a Manger" / "We Three Kings of Orient Are" (His Master's Voice, D.A. 2072)
- ????: "If I Loved You" / "Romance" (His Master's Voice, D.A. 2074)
- 1956: "Serenade" / "My Destiny" (His Master's Voice, D.A. 2085)
- ????: "This Land" / "Earthbound" (His Master's Voice, D.A. 2086)
- 1954: "Mamma, quel vino è generoso" (His Master's Voice, 7EB 6005)
- ????: "O Come All Ye Faithful" (His Master's Voice, 7EB 6008)
- ????: Christmastide with Lanza (His Master's Voice, 7EB 6020)
- 1956: Songs from The Student Prince, (His Master's Voice, 7EB 6023)
- ????: Romance in Song (His Master's Voice, 7EB 6025)
- ????: "Be My Love" / "The Bayou Lullaby" (His Master's Voice, 7R 130)
- ????: "Toselli's 'Serenade'" / "Serenade" (His Master's Voice, 7R 131)
- ????: "Lolita" / "Granada" (His Master's Voice, 7R 157)
- ????: "Lolita" / "Granada" (His Master's Voice, 7RF 253)

== Extended plays (EPs) ==
- 1949: That Midnight Kiss (RCA Victor Red Seal, LM-89)
- 1952: Mario Lanza Sings Selections from "Because You're Mine" (RCA Victor, ERA-51)
- 1952: Four Neapolitan Songs (RCA Red Seal, ERA-100)
- 1953: Mario Lanza in Movie Hits (RCA Victor, ERA-130)
- 1954: Mario Lanza Sings "Because", (RCA Victor, ERA-222)
- 1954: Mario Lanza Sings the Hit Songs from "The Student Prince" (RCA Victor, ERB 1837)
- 1955: The Student Prince (RCA, RCX 133)
- 1956: Four Favorite Christmas Carols (RCA Victor, ERB 1837)
- 1956: Mario da suerte (RCA, 3-26071, Spain)
- 1956: Serenade (RCA Victor, ERB 70-2)
- 1957: Mario Lanza a Broadway n° 1 (RCA Italiana, A72V 0137)
- 1957: "Granada" / "Mamma mia che vo' sape?" / "The Lord's Prayer" / "Yours Is My Heart Alone" (RCA Italiana, A72V 0150)
- 1957: "Core 'ngrato" / "The Donkey Serenade" / "Because" / "Serenata" (RCA Italiana, A72V 0151)
- 1957: Mario Lanza a Broadway n° 2 (RCA Italiana, A72V 0157)
- 1957: Mario Lanza a Napoli (RCA Italiana, A72V 0164)
- 1958: Arrivederci Roma (RCA Italiana, A72V 0204)
- 1958: "I'll Walk with God" / "Guardian Angels" / "The Lord's Prayer" / "Ave Maria" (RCA Victor, EPA 5048)
- 1959: Be My Love (RCA, RCX 1025)
- 1959: For the First Time (RCA Victor, EPA 4344)
- 1959: The Loveliest Night of the Year (RCA Victor, EPA 5083)
- 1959: Mario Lanza a Valencia (RCA Italiana, EPA 30-302)
- 1959: "Serenata de las mulas" / "Siboney" / "Bésame mucho" / "Rose Marie" (RCA Victor, 33027/3-20533)
- 1960: Film Hits (RCA, RCX 1056)
- 1960: Vieni sul mar (RCA, 86281)
- 1961: "Maria Marì" / "Funiculì funiculà" / "Tu ca nun chiagne" / "'Na sera 'e maggio" / "Comme facette mammeta" / "Dicitencello vuje" (RCA, LPC-31002)
- 1961: "Granada" / "Valencia" / "Lolita" / "La Danza" (RCA, LPC-5025)
- 1962: "Begin the Beguine" / "Noche y día" / "'O sole mio" / "Core 'ngrato" (RCA Victor, 3-20450)
- 1963: Because (RCA Victor, 86 202)

== Studio albums (EPs) ==
- 1949: That Midnight Kiss
- 1950: Operatic Arias and Duets as Sung in "The Toast of New Orleans" (RCA Victor Red Seal WDM-1395)
- 1950: Mario Lanza Sings Popular Songs from the M-G-M Technicolor Motion Picture "The Toast of New Orleans" (RCA Victor Red Seal WDM-1417)

== Studio albums (LPs) ==
- 1951: Mario Lanza Sings Selections from "The Great Caruso" (a.k.a. The Great Caruso; RCA Victor Red Seal LM-1127)
- 1951: Mario Lanza Sings Christmas Songs (RCA Victor Red Seal LM-155)
- 1952: Mario Lanza Sings Songs from M-G-M's Technicolor Motion Picture "Because You're Mine" (RCA Victor Red Seal LM-7015)
- 1954: Mario Lanza Sings the Hit Songs from "The Student Prince" and Other Great Musical Comedies (a.k.a. The Student Prince; RCA Victor Red Seal LM-1837)
- 1955: "A Kiss" and Other Love Songs (RCA Victor Red Seal LM-1860)
- 1955: The Touch of Your Hand (RCA Victor Red Seal LM-1927)
- 1956: Lanza Sings Christmas Carols (RCA Victor Red Seal LM-2029)
- 1956: The Magic Mario (RCA Victor Red Seal LM-1943)
- 1956: Mario Lanza in "Serenade" (RCA Victor Red Seal LM-1996)
- 1956: Lanza on Broadway (RCA Victor Red Seal LM-2070)
- 1957: A Cavalcade of Show Tunes (RCA Victor Red Seal LM-2090)
- 1958: Seven Hills of Rome (RCA Victor Red Seal LM-2211)
- 1959: Mario! (RCA Victor Red Seal LSC-2331)
- 1959: Lanza Sings Christmas Carols (RCA Victor Red Seal LSC-2333)
- 1959: For the First Time (RCA Victor Red Seal LSC-2338)
- 1959: The Student Prince (RCA Victor Red Seal LSC-2339)
- 1960: Mario Lanza Sings Caruso Favorites (RCA Victor Red Seal LSC-2393)
- 1960: The Desert Song (RCA Victor Red Seal LSC-2440)
- 1961: The Vagabond King (RCA Victor Red Seal LSC-2509)
- 1962: I'll Walk with God (RCA Victor Red Seal LM-2607)

== Compilation albums (LP) ==
- 1962: Love Songs & A Neopolitan Serenade (RCA Victor Red Seal LM-1188)
- 1963: You Do Something to Me (RCA Camden CAL 450)
- 1963: Mario Lanza – Christmas Hymns and Carols (RCA Camden CAL-777)
- 1964: The Best of Mario Lanza (RCA Victor Red Seal LM-2748)
- 1967: Mario Lanza sings His Favorite Arias (RCA Victor Red Seal LM-2932)
- 1968: The Best of Mario Lanza Volume 2 (RCA Victor Red Seal LM-2998)
- 1969: Mario Lanza in Opera (RCA Red Seal LSC-3101(e))
- 1969: Mario Lanza – Memories (RCA Red Seal LSC-3102(e))
- 1970: Mario Lanza in his Greatest Hits from operettas and Musicals (RCA Red Seal VCS-6192(e))
- 1971: Mario Lanza sings Opera's Greatest Hits (RCA Red Seal VCS-7073(e))
- 1972: Be My Love (RCA Red Seal LSC-3289(e))
- 1973: Lanza Sings Caruso (RCA Red Seal ARL1-0134(e))
- 1976: Mario Lanza – A Legendary Performer (RCA Red Seal CRL1-1750(e))
- 1978: Mario Lanza – Pure Gold (RCA ANL1-2847(e)) (Reissue of Lanza on Broadway)
- 1981: The Mario Lanza Collection (RCA Red Seal CRM5-4158)

== Select RCA CD reissues ==
- Mario Lanza Five CD Box Set (RCA 88697-5921822) Includes the RCA Victor Red Seal LPs:
1. The Student Prince (and Other Great Musical Comedies)
2. The Touch of Your Hand
3. Seven Hills of Rome (A: Soundtrack / B: Selections conducted by Henri René, Ray Heindorf)
4. I'll Walk with God
5. Mario Lanza Sings His Favorite Arias
- Mario Lanza – The Legendary Tenor (1987)
- Christmas with Mario Lanza (1987)
- The Great Caruso and Other Caruso Favorites (1989)
- Mario Lanza Sings Songs from "The Student Prince" and "The Desert Song" (1989)
- The Mario Lanza Collection (1991)
- Mario! Lanza at His Best (1995)
- Mario Lanza: Opera Arias and Duets (1999)
- Be My Love
- My Romance
- Don't Forget Me
- Mario Lanza Live from London
- Double Feature: For the First Time / That Midnight Kiss
- The Ultimate Collection
- Lanza: Greatest Hits
- The Essential Mario Lanza
- The Best of Everything
