= Old Heidelberg =

Old Heidelberg (German: Alt Heidelberg) may refer to:

- the historic German city of Heidelberg
- Old Heidelberg (poem), a poem by Joseph Victor von Scheffel
- Alt Heidelberg (play), a 1901 play by Wilhelm Meyer-Förster
- Old Heidelberg (1915 film), a 1915 American film
- Old Heidelberg (1923 film), a 1923 German film
- The Student Prince in Old Heidelberg, a 1926 American film
- Alt Heidelberg (tale) a 1940 Japanese tale by Osamu Dazai
- Old Heidelberg (1959 film), a West German film

== See also ==
- The Student Prince, an operetta based on the play
- The Student Prince (film), a film version of the operetta
