= Student Prince =

Student Prince may refer to:

- Adcox Student Prince, a biplane built in Portland, Oregon in 1929
- The Student Prince, an operetta by Sigmund Romberg and Dorothy Donnelly
- The Student Prince (film), a 1954 MGM film
  - The Student Prince (album), a 1954 album by Mario Lanza containing songs from the above film
- The Student Prince (restaurant), a German restaurant in Springfield, Massachusetts
- The Student Prince, a 1997 TV movie starring Robson Green
- Student Prince, a defunct club on the Jersey Shore
- The Student Princes, the athletic mascot of Heidelberg University in Ohio

== See also ==
- The Student Prince in Old Heidelberg, a 1927 silent film
