= Mario Lanza Sings Songs from "The Student Prince" and "The Desert Song" =

Mario Lanza Sings Songs from The Student Prince and The Desert Song

Compilation album by Mario Lanza
- Released: 1989
- Recorded: 1954, 1989
- Genres: Opera, Soundtrack
- Length: 73:23
- Label: RCA Victor

Professional ratings
Review scores
Source	Rating
AllMusic	4/5 stars
AllMusic	4.5/5 stars

Mario Lanza Sings Songs from The Student Prince and The Desert Song is a 1989 compilation album by Mario Lanza.

This RCA Victor CD features most of the songs recorded by Mario Lanza for the 1954 Metro-Goldwyn-Mayer film The Student Prince. These include several that would become closely identified with the tenor: "Serenade," "Drink! Drink! Drink!," "Beloved," and "I'll Walk with God." The last two selections are not by Sigmund Romberg, the original composer of The Student Prince, but were written especially for the film version by Nicholas Brodszky and Paul Francis Webster. Generally regarded as being among Lanza's finest renditions of English-language songs, The Student Prince was recorded in 1952, with one remake ("Beloved") in May 1953. For contractual reasons, the singing of soprano Ann Blyth (who originally sang with Lanza on two of the numbers) has been replaced by that of Elizabeth Doubleday on this disc. Constantine Callinicos was appointed Mario Lanza's musical director for the film, and most of the soundtrack recordings were made with Constantine Callinocos conducting the MGM Orchestra.

The second half of the CD consists of highlights from another Romberg operetta, The Desert Song. Recorded in Rome in August and September 1959 at a time when Lanza was recovering from a bout of double pneumonia, these are the tenor's final recordings. He died on October 7, 1959, shortly after the recordings were made. Lanza is accompanied here on several selections by soprano Judith Raskin, who recorded her contributions in New York a year after the tenor's death. Constantine Callinicos conducted these 1959 selections.

== Track listing ==
All tracks for The Student Prince written by Sigmund Romberg and Dorothy Donnelly, unless otherwise noted.

The Student Prince
No.	Title	Writer(s)	Length
1.	"Orchestral introduction"		3:22
2.	"Serenade"		3:48
3.	"Golden Days"		1:32
4.	"Drink, Drink, Drink"		3:19
5.	"Summertime in Heidelberg"	Nicholas Brodszky; Paul Francis Webster	2:31
6.	"Beloved"	Nicholas Brodszky; Paul Francis Webster	3:13
7.	"Gaudeamus igitur (Traditional)"		2:18
8.	"Deep in My Heart, Dear"		4:20
9.	"I'll Walk with God"	Nicholas Brodszky; Paul Francis Webster	3:01

All tracks for The Desert Song written by Sigmund Romberg, Oscar Hammerstein II, Otto Harbach and Frank Mandel

The Desert Song
No.	Title	Length
10.	"Overture"	5:00
11.	"The Desert Song"	6:09
12.	"French Military Marching Song"	3:58
13.	"The Riff Song"	2:03
14.	"I Want a Kiss"	2:53
15.	"Let Love Go"	1:30
16.	"One Flower in Your Garden"	2:30
17.	"Azuri's Dance"	4:27
18.	"Then You Will Know"	4:17
19.	"Instrumental"	1:50
20.	"Romance"	4:40
21.	"One Good Boy Gone Wrong"	3:05
22.	"One Alone"	3:37
Total length:		73:23
