= Ubaldo Pacchierotti =

Italian composer

Ubaldo Pacchierotti (1875/1876 – 21 April 1916) was an Italian composer who wrote several operas that were produced or published between 1899 and 1920.

Pacchierotti's second work, L'albatro: leggenda nordica, for at least one major reviewer established Pacchierotti as a young new composer of promise, although the work itself initially did not see many performances. L'albatro premiered at the Teatro Dal Verme in Milan in November 1905. In November 1907, extracts of the work were played as a prelude to a performance of Cavalleria Rusticana in Turin.

The reviewer for La Stampa commented favorably on both the Milan premiere of the entire opera, and the extracts performed in Turin, stating that the pieces were:

"all notable for their elegance, beauty of form, and nobility of subject; we are reconfirmed in the hope of finding in Pacchierotti -- who is young -- the sort of refined, clever, and popular composer in the field of home-grown lyric opera of which young valiants we are in such need" ("tutte notevolie per eleganza, leggiadria di forme e nobilita' de contenuto, ci siamo riconfermati nella speranza di ritrovare nel Pacchierotti – chi e' giovane d'anni – il musicista colto e geniale, autore applaudito nel campo della lirica operistica nostrana, la quale di giovani valorosi ha veramente bisogno.")

L'albatro was revived in Florence in 1914 to an enthusiastic reception.

Pacchierotti's most successful work was Eidelberga Mia (My Heidelberg), a four-act opera which was based on the 1901 play Alt Heidelberg or Old Heidelberg, by Wilhelm Meyer-Förster (the same work upon which Sigmund Romberg created the well-known operetta The Student Prince). The story recounts the brief love that springs up between the young prince Carlo Enrico, who is passing time in Heidelberg as a student, and the beautiful but poor daughter of an innkeeper (Catina). The two fall sweetly in love, but the prince ultimately cannot remain with her because of the difference in their social stations: he must return to his homeland for a properly royal marriage. He bids her a tender farewell, saying that their tears of remembrance for one another will never run dry.

The work premiered in Genoa at the Teatro Carlo Felice in 1908, and was scheduled for a run of four performances.

At the premiere, the opera received a "full and warm" reception from the audience, with the authors being called to take bows twice during the first act. One reviewer praised the "inspired, fluid, original" music. More than one writer noted that the first two acts received a greater response than the last two.

The next year, Eidelberg Mia was performed at the Volksoper in Vienna on 12 February 1909, to a positive audience reaction and good reviews. This was the Viennese premiere. According to a contemporary notice in La Stampa, at the Viennese premiere the authors received 37 curtain calls. The work was also presented in New York under the title Alt Heidelberg. A piano-vocal score was published by Puccio, Milan, in 1908, and an essay and a tenor aria from Act IV was published in the first issue of Rassegna internazionale di musica, published by fratelli Serra, Genoa.

A tenor aria from the work was recorded on 16 December 1909, by tenor Umberto Macnez, a recording of which is still commercially available.

Il santo premiered in Turin at the Teatro Regio (Turin), on or around 15 March 1913. A review in La Stampa was unfavorable of both the music, and the match between the music and the libretto, and stated that the opera would be taken down after a second performance. The review harkened back to the unfulfilled (to the reviewer) promise of L'albatro.

Due to Pacchierotti's early death, Il santo was his last opera. He was represented by ASCAP.

== Operatic works ==
- La lampada (libretto by Ferdinando Fontana) (prem. Buenos Aires, 16 December 1899)
- L' albatro: leggenda nordica (libretto by Alberto Colantuoni) (prem. Teatro del Verme, Milan, 1905)
- Eidelberga mia (sometimes written with an exclamation mark), also known as Alt Heidelberg, and Aidelberga Mia (libretto by Alberto Colantuoni; prem. Genoa, 1908, pub. Milano, Puccio, 1908)
- Il santo (libretto by Carlo Zangarini; prem. Turin, 1913, pub. Puccio 1920)
