= The Student Prince (film) =

1954 film by Richard Thorpe

- Film poster
- Directed by: Richard Thorpe
- Written by: Sonya Levien; William Ludwig
- Based on: Old Heidelberg; 1901 play by Wilhelm Meyer-Förster; The Student Prince; Dorothy Donnelly
- Produced by: Joe Pasternak
- Starring: Ann Blyth; Edmund Purdom; John Ericson; Louis Calhern; Edmund Gwenn; S. Z. Sakall; Betta St. John
- Cinematography: Paul C. Vogel
- Edited by: Gene Ruggiero
- Music by: Sigmund Romberg; Georgie Stoll (adaptation)
- Production company: Metro-Goldwyn-Mayer
- Distributed by: Loew's Inc.
- Release date: June 15, 1954
- Running time: 107 minutes
- Country: United States
- Language: English
- Budget: $2,438,000
- Box office: $5,341,000

The Student Prince is a 1954 American musical film directed by Richard Thorpe and starring Ann Blyth, Edmund Purdom, John Ericson, Louis Calhern, Edmund Gwenn, S. Z. Sakall and Betta St. John. The film is an adaptation of the 1924 operetta of the same name composed by Sigmund Romberg with lyrics by Dorothy Donnelly. The film's screenplay was written by Sonya Levien and William Ludwig.

Based on the stage play Old Heidelberg by Wilhelm Meyer-Förster (itself an adaptation of his obscure 1898 novel, Karl Heinrich), the film is about a brash young prince of a small German kingdom who must choose between his romance with a barmaid and his impending royal duties. It was filmed and released in CinemaScope and Ansco Color.

During production, original star Mario Lanza left the project before principal photography, necessitating his last-minute replacement by the lesser-known Purdom. Because of the contractual agreement between Metro-Goldwyn-Mayer and Lanza, songs that Lanza had recorded were dubbed with Purdom lip syncing.

== Plot ==
At the royal palace in Karlsburg, King Ferdinand counsels his grandson, Prince Karl Franz, on the young man's imminent engagement to the wealthy Princess Johanna of Nordhausen. The king observes that although their country is poor, it has always survived because the men of the royal family marry well. The following evening, Johanna is feted with a ball, but she finds the prince's cold, formal manner off-putting.

The king and Johanna's mother, Queen Mathilda, discuss the shaky prospects for an alliance between their heirs, and Mathilda says that Karl must learn to radiate warmth and charm. Karl's teacher, Prof. Juttner, is summoned to the palace in the middle of the night and ordered to instruct the prince in the graces of living. Juttner maintains that such an education comes from being with other people, and recommends that Karl be sent to his own alma mater, the University of Heidelberg. Karl is dispatched to Heidelberg the next day, along with Juttner and the punctilious royal valet, Lutz.

They take rooms in an inn owned by Joseph Ruder, and Karl is immediately charmed by Ruder's pretty niece Kathie. When Karl impulsively kisses Kathie, however, she angrily rebuffs him. Classes begin, and the haughty prince bristles at being treated like all the other students. After chastening comments from Juttner and Kathie, however, Karl resolves to adapt to student life, and quickly finds that he enjoys it.

On Kathie's recommendation, he joins the Westphalians, a student corps made up of good-natured commoners, and learns to consume prodigious amounts of beer. When Karl again attempts to kiss Kathie one evening, she knocks him down, as Lutz watches, aghast. Lutz orders Ruder to send Kathie away, threatening dire consequences if the incident is reported. The distraught Ruder goes to Kathie's room and finds her already packing, and tells her where to find a job in a nearby town.

The following evening, the students protest Kathie's absence, and Ruder confides to Karl the name of the restaurant where Kathie now works. Karl goes to apologize, and when he causes Kathie to break some plates, she loses her job. Karl humbly beseeches Kathie to return to Heidelberg and declares his feelings for her. Now in love, Karl and Kathie return to Ruder's inn.

One night, Karl is drinking and singing with the Westphalians when his true identity is accidentally revealed to the imperious Count Von Asterburg, head of the elitist Saxo-Borussian corps. Von Asterburg insists that the prince join their corps, and when Karl refuses to leave his Westphalian friends, challenges him to a duel. Karl defeats Von Asterburg in a sword fight, and the two men shake hands as friends, but Kathie is appalled.

The lovers make up, and one night, at a carnival, Karl asks Kathie to go away with him. Before they can leave, however, Prime Minister Von Mark arrives from Karlsburg with the news that the king is ill and wishes to see Karl. After promising Kathie he will return, Karl returns to the palace. The king announces that Karl's marriage to Johanna will take place shortly, and when Karl protests that he is in love with Kathie, the king reminds him of his duty.

Karl accuses Von Mark of having tricked him into returning, but the prime minister replies that the king is actually much sicker than he realizes. The king passes away, and preparations are made for Karl's marriage. While traveling to Nordhausen for the wedding, Karl suddenly orders the train to stop in Heidelberg. Karl goes to Ruder's inn, where he and Kathie lovingly say goodbye.

== Cast ==
- Ann Blyth as Kathie Ruder
- Edmund Purdom as Prince Karl
  - Mario Lanza as Karl's singing voice
- John Ericson as Count Von Asterburg
- Louis Calhern as King Ferdinand of Karlsburg
- Edmund Gwenn as Prof. Juttner
- S. Z. Sakall as Joseph Ruder (credited as S. Z. "Cuddles" Sakall)
- Betta St. John as Princess Johanna
- John Williams as Lutz
- Evelyn Varden as Queen
- John Hoyt as Prime Minister
- Richard Anderson as Lucas
- Roger Allen as Von Fischtenstein
- Steve Rowland as Feuerwald
- Chris Warfield as Richter
- Gilbert Legay as Von Buhler
- Archer MacDonald as Head Corps Servant
- Charles Davis as Hubert
- John Qualen as Willie Klauber
- Gordon Richards as Major Domo

== Production ==
The film's credits mention "the singing voice of Mario Lanza"; Lanza had originally been cast as Prince Karl, but he walked off the picture and was eventually fired. Under the terms of the eventual settlement between MGM and Lanza, the studio retained the rights to use the songs for the film's soundtrack that Lanza had already recorded. The songs, including "Beloved"–written specially for the film–and the well-remembered "Serenade", from the original show, would become some of those most identified with Lanza, even though they were mouthed in the film by Edmund Purdom, who took over the role of Prince Karl. Ann Blyth played opposite Lanza in the 1951 blockbuster The Great Caruso.

The film was directed by Richard Thorpe, who replaced original director Curtis Bernhardt, and was produced by Joe Pasternak. The screenplay was written by Sonya Levien and William Ludwig based on the operetta The Student Prince by Sigmund Romberg and Dorothy Donnelly, which was in turn based on the 1901 play Old Heidelberg by Wilhelm Meyer-Förster. New scenes and rewritten dialogue not found in the stage production were also added, although the basic plot remained the same. Additional songs were specially written by Nicholas Brodszky and Paul Francis Webster. Many of Donnelly's original stage lyrics were completely changed for the film. The story has been adapted for the screen several times, including the American silent film Old Heidelberg (1915), the German silent film Old Heidelberg (1923), Ernst Lubitsch's The Student Prince in Old Heidelberg (1927) and Ernst Marischka's Old Heidelberg (1959).

== Reception ==
The film was a financial success. According to MGM records, it earned $2,528,000 in the US and Canada and $2,813,000 in other countries, resulting in a profit of $451,000.

== Selected songs ==
- "Serenade"
- "Deep In My Heart, Dear"
- "Summertime in Heidelberg"
- "Beloved"
- "I'll Walk with God"
- "Drinking Song"
- "Come Boys", etc.

== Soundtrack ==
RCA Victor issued two different soundtrack recordings, both featuring the voice of Lanza. The first, in 1954, was a genuine film soundtrack recording in monophonic sound. Rather than reissuing the original soundtrack in stereophonic sound (which would have been possible as the film's audio was in four-track stereo, and stereo records were released starting in 1958), RCA Victor recorded and released an all-new stereo album with Lanza in 1959. The original Dorothy Donnelly lyrics were restored to the album. Both albums included the three additional songs written specially for the film version ("Summertime in Heidelberg", "I'll Walk with God" and "Beloved"), and both albums omit Kathie's solo, "Come Boys."
