= Pecche =

Pecche is a surname. Notable people with the surname include:

- William Pecche (1359–1399), British politician, son of John
- John Pecche (1332–1380), British merchant

== See also ==
- "Pecché?", 1913 Neapolitan song by Gaetano Enrico Pennino to lyrics by Carlo De Flavis
