= Midnight Kiss =

Midnight Kiss may refer to:

- Midnight Kiss (comics), a Markosia comics series by Tony Lee
- Midnight Kiss (EP), a 2013 EP by Propellers, or its title track
- "Midnight Kiss", a song by Gaelic Storm from the 2001 album Tree
- "Midnight Kiss" (Into the Dark), an episode of the second season of Into the Dark
- "Midnight Kiss", a song by Ive from the 2025 EP Ive Secret

== See also ==
- The Midnight Kiss, a 1926 film by Irving Cummings starring Janet Gaynor
- That Midnight Kiss, a 1949 film starring Mario Lanza
- That Midnight Kiss, a 1949 EP by Mario Lanza
- "Un bacio a mezzanotte" ("A Kiss at Midnight"), a 1952 Italian song
- "Kiss Me at Midnight", a song by NSYNC from the 1998 album Home for Christmas
