= You're Mine (disambiguation) =

"You're Mine" is a song by John Entwistle from the 1971 album Smash Your Head Against the Wall.

You Are Mine, or You're Mine, may also refer to:

- You Are Mine (絕對佔領), a 2023 web series, Taiwanese web series starring Angel Hong
- "You're Mine (Eternal)", song by American singer Mariah Carey
- "You're Mine" (Killing Eve), an episode of the television series Killing Eve
- "You're Mine", song by Baha Men from their 2000 album Who Let the Dogs Out
- "You're Mine" (Phantogram song), a song by American electronic rock duo Phantogram from the album Three
- "Tu Hi Mera" (lit. 'You're Mine'), a song by Pritam and Shafqat Amanat Ali from the 2012 Indian film Jannat 2

== See also ==
- Because You're Mine (disambiguation)
- You're Mine, Only Mine, an installment of the Precious Hearts Romances Presents series
- "You're Mines Still", a 2020 song by American rapper Yung Bleu
- You're Mine You, a 1962 studio album by the American jazz singer Sarah Vaughan
