= You Are My Love =

You Are My Love may refer to:

- You Are My Love (film), a 1941 Argentine comedy film
- "You Are My Love" (1953 song), a song written by Constantine Callinicos and Paul Francis Webster, popularized by Mario Lanza
- "You Are My Love" (1955 song), a song written by Jimmie Nabbie, popularized by Joni James
- "You Are My Love", a 1976 song by the Liverpool Express
- *You Are My Love (album), a 1959 album by Frankie Laine
- "You Are My Love", Jim Reeves C. Cooper W. Cooper The International Jim Reeves

== See also ==
- Are You My Love? (disambiguation)
