= Alfredo Mazzucchi =

Italian composer

Emanuele Alfredo Mazzucchi (1878–1972) was an Italian composer and musician, known for being the co-author of some famous pieces of the Canzone Napoletana (Neapolitan songs) such as "'O sole mio", "Maria Marì", and "I' te vurria vasà".

Alfredo Mazzucchi was a composer and mandolinist who, on behalf of the musical publishers, made some adjustments to the original melodies before the publication of the songs; in this capacity he was therefore the co-author, together with Eduardo di Capua, of some well-known pieces of the Neapolitan songs including "'O sole mio". According to others, however, Mazzucchi was a talented young composer who worked with the already famous Di Capua: Mazzucchi played his compositions, Di Capua listened to them and made some changes, and then published them only in his name.

His contributions were not recognized for many years. Only on November 6, 1973, when the publisher "Casa Editrice Ferdinando Bideri" filed a complaint with the Ufficio della Proprietà Letteraria, Artistica e Scientifica (UPLAS) (in English Office of Literary, Artistic and Scientific Property), it indicated Mazzucchi as co-author of between 18 and 23 pieces signed only by Eduardo Di Capua. The Presidency of the Council of Ministers opposed the complaint, presenting an appeal accepted on April 29, 1994, by the first Section of the Civil Court of Rome.

In October 1999, a great-grandson of Eduardo Di Capua claimed his ancestor's sole authorship of "'O sole mio", but at the subsequent recourse of Mazzucchi's heirs, the heir admitted the collaboration between the two composers, so that the verdict issued by the Court of Turin in March 2002 recognized Alfredo Mazzucchi as co-author of the melody of a total of 23 total songs, which will therefore remain under copyright until 2042 (i.e. 70 years after the author's death).
