= Mario! Lanza at His Best =

Compilation album by Mario Lanza, Judith Raskin
- Released: 1995
- Recorded: 1958–1959
- Genres: Opera, Neapolitan and Italian songs, classical
- Label: RCA Victor

Mario! Lanza At His Best is a CD released by RCA Victor in 1995, and consists of two original albums recorded by tenor Mario Lanza. These are: the Neapolitan songs album Mario!, recorded in December 1958, and The Vagabond King, recorded in July 1959. The Mario! album has been singled out for special praise, with its star conductor Franco Ferrara of Rome's Accademia Nazionale di Santa Cecilia later hailing Lanza's singing on the disc as "vocally extraordinary...a Caruso-type voice." Lanza's first studio album in stereo, the Mario! selections include the Neapolitan songs "Voce 'e Notte," "Canta Pe' Me," "'Na Sera 'e Maggio," and "Passione." The arrangements were created by Carlo Savina and Ennio Morricone.

The Vagabond King, an operetta by Rudolf Friml, was recorded three months before Mario Lanza's death in October 1959. The selections include "Love Me Tonight," "Nocturne," "Only a Rose," and the "Drinking Song." Lanza is accompanied on several songs by the soprano Judith Raskin, who recorded her contributions a year later in New York. The conductor was Constantine Callinicos.

Note: In February 2006, this album was reissued by RCA in the sonically superior SACD format. This new CD can be played on both SACD players and conventional CD players.

== Track list ==
=== 1958 album "Mario! Lanza at His Best" ===
1. "Funiculì, funiculà"
2. "Dicitencello vuie"
3. "Maria marì" (Remastered - 1995)
4. "Voce 'e notte"
5. "Canta pe' me"
6. "'O surdato 'nnammurato" - the enamoured soldier
7. "Comme facette mammeta?"
8. "Santa Lucia Luntana"
9. "Fenesta che lucive"
10. "Tu ca nun chiagne"
11. "Na sera 'e maggio"
12. "Passione"

=== 1959 album "The Vagabond King" ===
1. "Drinking Song"
2. "Some Day" with Judith Raskin
3. "Love Me Tonight"
4. "Only a Rose" with Judith Raskin
5. "Tomorrow" with Judith Raskin
6. "Nocturne" with Chorus
7. "Song of the Vagabonds" with Chorus
8. "Finale" with Judith Raskin
