= Because You're Mine (disambiguation) =

Because You're Mine is a 1952 musical comedy film.

Because You're Mine may also refer to:

- Because You're Mine (album), a 1952 album by Mario Lanza featuring songs from the film
- "Because You're Mine" (song), a song from the film, performed by Mario Lanza, also covered by Nat King Cole
- "Because You're Mine", a song by Chanté Moore, with BeBe Winans, from Precious
- Because You're Mine, a 1997 novel by Lisa Kleypas
