= Are You My Love? =

Are You My Love? may refer to:

- "Are You My Love?", a song from the 2002 1 Giant Leap album, What About Me?
- "Are You My Love?", a song from the 1936 film Dancing Pirate

== See also ==
- Where Are You My Love? (disambiguation)
- You Are My Love (disambiguation)
