= Canzone napoletana =

Genre of music related to the musical tradition of Naples

Canzone napoletana (Italian: [kanˈtsoːne napoleˈtaːna]; Neapolitan: canzona napulitana [kanˈdzoːnə napuliˈtɑːnə]), sometimes referred to as Neapolitan song, is a generic term for a traditional form of music sung in the Neapolitan language, ordinarily for the male voice singing solo, although well represented by female soloists as well, and expressed in familiar genres such as the love song and serenade. Many of the songs are about the nostalgic longing for Naples as it once was. The genre consists of a large body of composed popular music—such songs as "'O sole mio"; "Torna a Surriento"; "Funiculì, Funiculà"; "Santa Lucia" and others.

The Neapolitan song became a formal institution in the 1830s due to an annual song-writing competition for the Festival of Piedigrotta, dedicated to the Madonna of Piedigrotta, a well-known church in the Mergellina area of Naples. The winner of the first festival was a song entitled "Te voglio bene assaje"; it is traditionally attributed to the prominent opera composer Gaetano Donizetti, although an article published in 1984 by Marcello Sorce Keller shows there is no historical evidence in support of the attribution. The festival ran regularly until 1950, when it was abandoned. A subsequent Festival of Neapolitan Song on Italian state radio enjoyed some success in the 1950s but was eventually abandoned as well.

The period since 1950 has produced such songs as "Malafemmena" by Totò, "Maruzzella" by Renato Carosone, "Indifferentemente" by Mario Trevi and "Carmela" by Sergio Bruni. Although separated by some decades from the earlier classics of this genre, they have now become Neapolitan "classics" in their own right.

== History ==
Many of the Neapolitan songs are world-famous because they were taken abroad by emigrants from Naples and southern Italy, roughly between 1880 and 1920. The music also was popularized abroad by performers such as Enrico Caruso, who took to singing the popular music of his native city as encores at the Metropolitan Opera in New York in the early 1900s. Caruso also recorded many of these songs, which subsequently became part of the standard repertoire for operatic tenors, and which were performed and recorded by such notable singers as Beniamino Gigli, Francesco Albanese, Franco Corelli, Mario Del Monaco, Giuseppe Di Stefano, and Tito Schipa. The Three Tenors also performed popular songs from Naples. Plácido Domingo recorded a full CD Italia ti amo of traditional and some more modern Neapolitan and Italian songs. Luciano Pavarotti recorded three albums of Neapolitan and Italian songs: The Best: Disc 2, (2005), Pavarotti Songbook, (1991), and Romantica, (2002). Mario Lanza recorded an acclaimed selection of 12 Neapolitan songs on his 1959 album, Mario! Lanza at His Best. Opera/pop crossover tenor, Sergio Franchi recorded his very popular Billboard Top 25 RCA debut album, Romantic Italian Songs in 1962, and continued to record Neapolitan songs on most of his albums throughout his career. Andrea Bocelli recorded an album in 2009 dedicated to the style, entitled Incanto.

The most important native Neapolitan performers of Neapolitan songs in the last few decades include Roberto Murolo, Bruno Venturini, Mario Trevi, Mario Abbate, Mario Merola, Giulietta Sacco, Franco Ricci, Sergio Bruni, Renato Carosone, and Mario Maglione. Murolo is known not only as a singer and guitarist, but also as a composer, scholar and collector of the music; his collection of twelve LPs, released in the 1960s, is an annotated compendium of Neapolitan song dating back to the twelfth century. Representatives of different veins, but nevertheless leading the continuing tradition of song in Neapolitan, are the jazz-rock singer-songwriter Pino Daniele and the folkloric group Nuova Compagnia di Canto Popolare; Almamegretta and 99 posse are representative of a blend of Neapolitan songs and dub/trip hop, with the former appearing in a song with the Bristol duo Massive Attack.

All Neapolitan songs are written and performed in the Neapolitan language. Although the music is sung by many non-Neapolitan singers, it is difficult to sing correctly without knowledge of the Neapolitan dialect, which is crucial in obtaining the correct inflection. The matter of dialect has not prevented a few non-Neapolitans from writing dialect versions of Neapolitan songs. The most famous examples of this are 'A vucchella by Gabriele D'Annunzio and Tu sì 'na cosa grande by Domenico Modugno.

Since the second half of the 2010s, a new sub-set of Neapolitan music has begun to emerge which mixed various traditional elements with aspects of hip hop, electronic, techno and urban music. Among the major representatives of this "new school" we find Liberato, Geolier and Clementino.

== List of songs ==
- 'A vucchella
- Accarezzame
- Canzone amalfitana
- Caruso
- C'è la luna mezz'o mare
- Cerasella
- Comme facette mammeta
- Core 'ngrato
- Cu 'mmé
- Dicitencello vuje
- Era de maggio
- Fenesta vascia
- Funiculì, Funiculà
- Guaglione
- I' te vurria vasà
- Indifferentemente
- Lacreme napulitane
- Lazzarella
- Luna caprese
- Luna rossa
- Malafemmena
- Mamma mia che vo sapé
- Mare verde
- Marechiare
- Marenariello
- María, Marí
- Munasterio 'e Santa Chiara
- Na' sera e' maggio
- 'O marenariello
- 'O paese d'o Sole
- 'O sarracino
- 'O sole mio
- 'O surdato 'nnammurato
- Passione
- Pecché?
- Reginella
- Rose rosse
- Santa Lucia
- Santa Lucia Luntana
- Tiempe belle
- Torna a Surriento
- Tu vuò fà l'americano
- Voce ′e notte

== Noted figures ==
=== Recording artists ===
- Mario Abbate
- Francesco Albanese
- Renzo Arbore
- Andrea Bocelli
- Sergio Bruni
- Renato Carosone
- Enrico Caruso
- Franco Corelli
- Nino D'Angelo
- Gigi D'Alessio
- Gabriele D'Annunzio
- Pino Daniele
- Mario Del Monaco
- Giuseppe Di Stefano
- Elvira Donnarumma
- Aurelio Fierro
- Gigi Finizio
- Sergio Franchi
- Natale Galletta
- Beniamino Gigli
- Mario Lanza
- Angela Luce
- Mario Maglione
- Mia Martini
- Joe Masiello
- Mario Merola
- Gilda Mignonette
- Roberto Murolo
- Tullio Pane
- Maria Paris
- Gennaro Pasquariello
- Luciano Pavarotti
- Massimo Ranieri
- Giacomo Rondinella
- Jimmy Roselli
- Giulietta Sacco
- Lina Sastri
- Tito Schipa
- Totò
- Mario Trevi
- Roberto Alagna

=== Composers ===
- Pasquale Mario Costa
- Pino Daniele
- Ernesto De Curtis
- Luigi Denza
- Peppino di Capri
- Eduardo di Capua
- Enzo Gragnaniello
- E. A. Mario
- Salvatore Mazzocco
- Emanuele Nutile
- Raffaele Sacco
- Francesco Paolo Tosti

== See also ==
- it:Canzoni della tradizione classica napoletana (1830-1970)
- Festival di Napoli (Festival della Canzone Napoletana)
- Tarantella

== Bibliography ==
- Marcello Sorce Keller, "Continuing Opera with Other Means: Opera, Neapolitan Song, and Popular Music among Italian Immigrants Overseas", Forum Italicum, Vol. XLIX (2015), No. 3, 1–20.
