= Arturo Buzzi-Peccia =

Italian composer

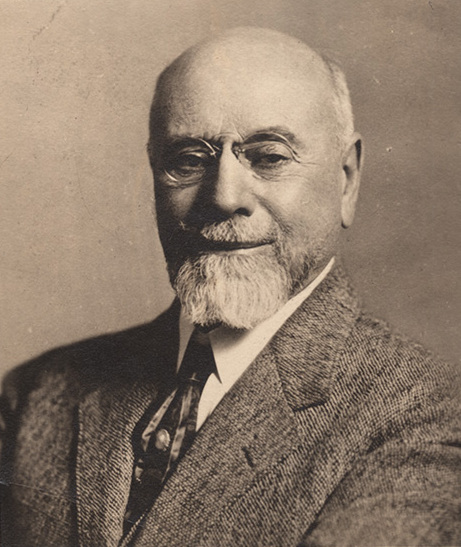
Arturo Buzzi-Peccia

Arturo Buzzi-Peccia (13 October 1853 – 29 August 1943) was an Italian singing instructor and song composer.

== Biography ==
Buzzi-Peccia was born on 13 October 1853 in Milan, Austrian Empire, to Antonio and Clotilde Peccia. When he was about five, Milan came under Italian control. In 1868, he was accepted at the Milan Conservatory where he studied composition under Antonio Bazzini. In the late 1870s, he went to Paris to continue his studies under Massenet and Saint-Saëns. He returned to Italy, first to Milan and eventually taking a position in Turin as a voice teacher.

He began to write music while still in school, and composed three works to secure his diploma from the Milan Conservatory in 1875. In 1886, his Visione e Baccanale romano was performed at La Scala. His symphonic poem Re Harfagar received critical acclaim when it premiered at La Scala in 1888. The 1897 premiere in Turin of Buzzi-Peccia's only opera, Forza d'Amore, was conducted by Arturo Toscanini. One of his best-known works is "Lolita: Serenata spagnola" (1892), recorded by many singers over the years including Enrico Caruso, John McCormack, Titta Ruffo, Mario Lanza, Richard Tucker and Alfredo Kraus. His "Mal d'Amore" was sung by Joseph Schmidt in the 1934 film My Song Goes Round the World. Most of his songs were written in Italian, but he also wrote lyrics in French and English. His most famous novelty song, "La Cigarette du Paradis" (Song of the Cigarette), was written in French.

He came to the United States in 1898 to teach voice at the Chicago Musical College with references from such notables as Giuseppe Verdi and Arrigo Boito. Two years later Buzzi-Peccia moved to New York to teach at the Metropolitan College of Music. He was the first voice teacher of Alma Gluck, and also of Sophie Braslau. Another pupil of Buzzi-Peccia was Dorothy Caruso, wife of Enrico Caruso. (Note: Buzzi-Peccia set some of her poetry to music, and Caruso sang them in concert.)

Many artists recorded Buzzi-Peccia's songs, among them Amelita Galli-Curci, Beniamino Gigli, Aureliano Pertile, Claudia Muzio, Carlo Bergonzi, Luciano Pavarotti, Giuseppe Di Stefano, and Roberto Alagna.

== Selected music ==
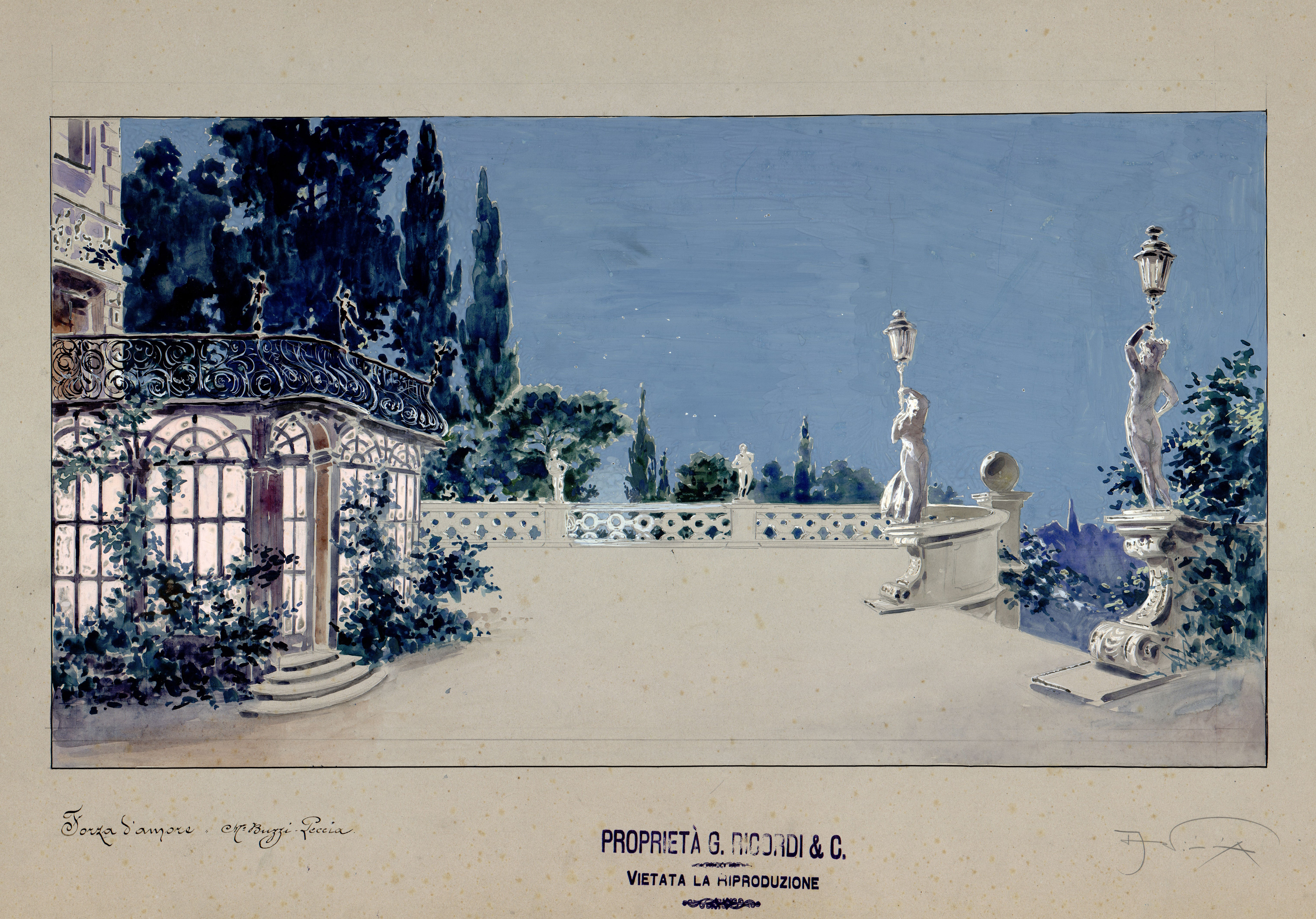
Nel palazzo del Conte di Narval, set design for La forza d'amore act 2 (1897).

=== Songs ===
- "Ave Maria".
- "Baciami".
- "Black Magic", words by C. D. Isaacson.
- "Brezza marina", barcarolle for pianoforte.
- "Capriccioso in re" for pianoforte.
- "La Cigarette du Paradis" (Song of the Cigarette), words in English by R. Lorfin. (Note: R. Lorfin is a pseudonym of American poet Lorraine Noel Finley.)
- "Colombetta: Serenata veneziana" (Columbine: a Venetian serenade).
- "Come buy", from Shakespeare's The Winter's Tale.
- "The Conscientious Deacon", words by V. Lindsay.
- "Eternal Light!" (Lux eterna)
- "Fair Dreams" (Les beaux rêves); words by Axel, English version by P. C. Warren.
- "A Fly Song", tragicomical encore ditty, etc., words by J. D. Wells.
- Four French Songs. (1915)
- Four Songs on texts by Rabindranath Tagore, 1920, published by Oliver Ditson
1. Forget the Night
2. In the Flower Garden
3. The Song of Ahez the Pale
4. When I go alone
- "Gloria". Duet for soprano and alto, words by M. C. Schuyler.
- "Going to War".
- "Good Night my Love".

Lolita

- Lolita. (1892)
- "Mariolina: a love call" (c. 1934).* "Inno all' amore" (Glory to Love). (1904)
- "Mal d'amore".
- "Torna amore".
- Two Encore Songs
1. "My mother bids me spend my smiles", words by T. Hood.
2. "Venus' runaway", words by B. Jonson.

=== Piano music ===
- Galanteries, causeries pour piano.
