= Paolo Tosti =

Italian composer

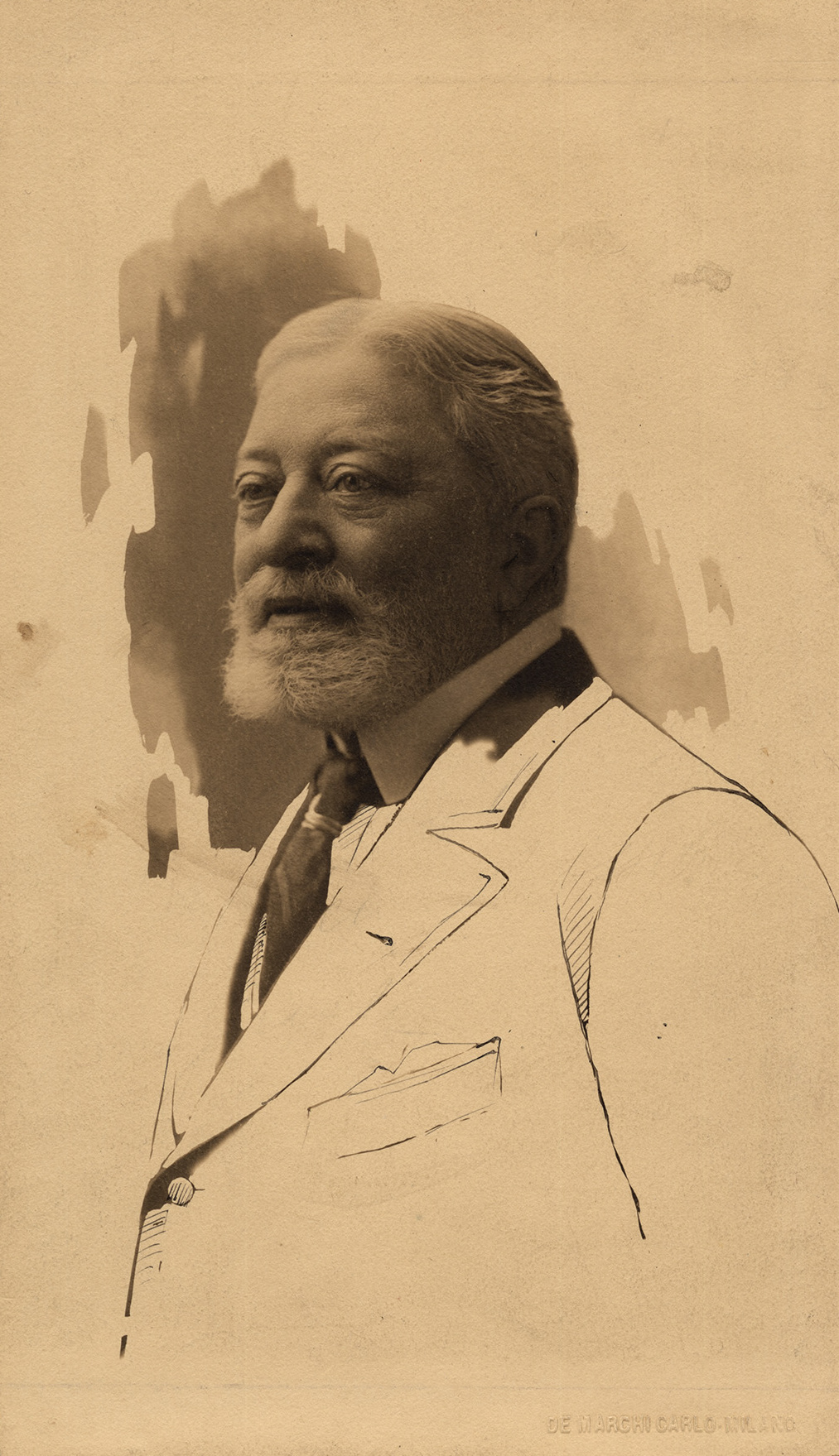
Portrait of Francesco Paolo Tosti by Carlo De Marchi

Sir Francesco Paolo Tosti KCVO (9 April 1846, Ortona, Abruzzo – 2 December 1916, Rome) was an Italian composer and music teacher. Today, he is remembered mostly for his light-hearted songs, which are popular among vocal students.

== Biography ==
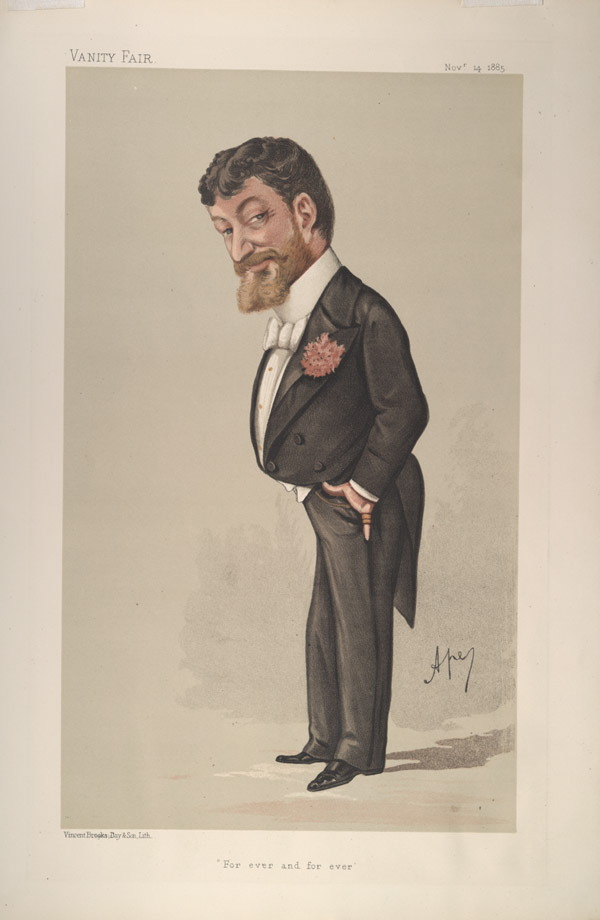
"For ever and for ever". Caricature by Ape published in Vanity Fair in 1885

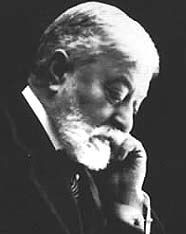
Francesco Paolo Tosti

Francesco Paolo Tosti received most of his music education in his native Ortona, Italy, as well as at the conservatory in Naples. Tosti began studying at the Royal College of San Pietro a Majella in Naples at the age of eleven. He studied violin and composition with Saverio Mercadante, who became so impressed with Tosti that he appointed him as a student teacher, which afforded the young man a meagre salary of sixty francs a month. Poor health forced Tosti to leave his studies and to return home to Ortona. He was confined to his bed for several months. During this time he composed several songs, two of which he submitted to the Florentine Art Society, and two others he submitted for publication to Ricordi. All four were rejected.

Once recovered from his illness, Tosti moved to Ancona, where his poverty was such that for weeks at a time he subsisted on nothing but oranges and stale bread. His travels brought him to Rome, where his fortunes turned. He met the pianist and composer Giovanni Sgambati, who became his patron. Sgambati arranged for Tosti to give a concert at the Sala Dante which the Princess Margherita of Savoy (who would become Queen of Italy in 1878) attended. Impressed with his performance, she appointed him as her singing professor. She later appointed him curator of the Musical Archives of Italy at the Court.

In 1875 Tosti travelled to London, England. He made several powerful friends who introduced him to the highest levels of English society. Tosti became a staple in fashionable drawing-rooms and salons, and in 1880 he was made singing-master to the British royal family. His fame as a composer of songs grew rapidly during his time in England. One of his compositions, For Ever and For Ever was introduced by Violet Cameron at the Globe Theatre. This song became a favourite overnight, and there was an enormous demand for his compositions. By 1885 he was the most popular composer of songs in England. His publishers paid him a staggering retaining-fee for twelve songs a year.

In 1894 Tosti joined the Royal Academy of Music as a professor. In 1906, he became a British citizen and was knighted (KCVO) two years later by his friend, King Edward VII. A memorial plaque on his former home at 12 Mandeville Place, Marylebone (now the Mandeville Hotel) was unveiled on 12 June 1996.

In 1913 he returned to Italy to spend his last years there. He died in Rome on 2 December 1916.

== Works ==
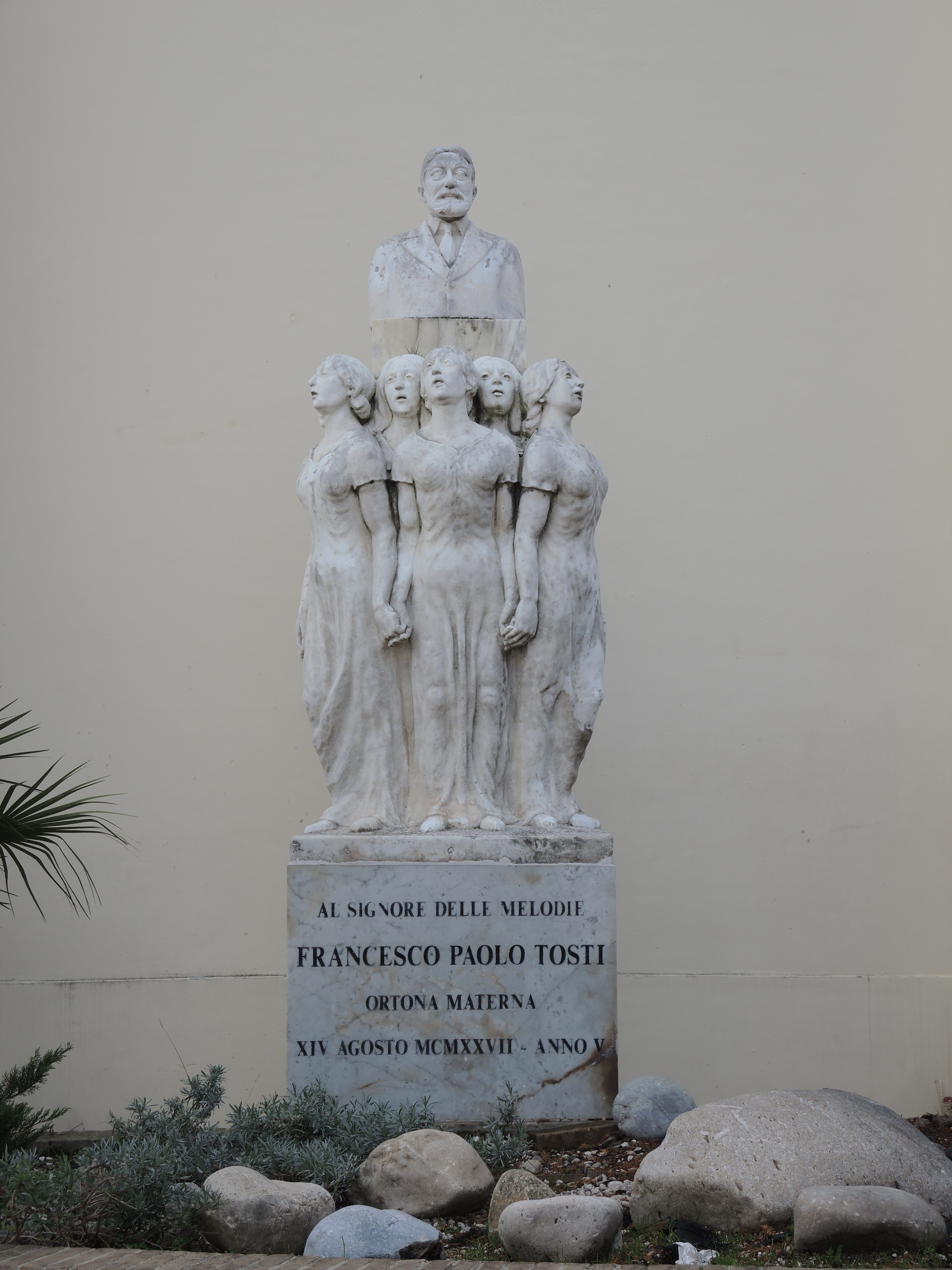
Monument to Francesco Paolo Tosti in Ortona

Tosti is remembered for his light, expressive songs, which are characterised by natural, singable melodies and sweet sentimentality. He is also known for his editions of Italian folk songs entitled Canti popolari Abruzzesi.

His style became very popular during the Belle Époque and is often known as salon music. There is, however, much evidence (albeit fleeting) of a more serious composer particularly in the Canti popolari Abruzzesi, particularly in the introduction to "No. 8 First Waltz".

His most famous works are "'A vucchella" (lyrics by the italian poet Gabriele D'Annunzio), "Serenata" (lyrics: Cesareo), "Good-bye!" (lyrics: George Whyte-Melville) which is sometimes performed in Italian as "Addio" (lyrics: Rizzelli), and the popular Neapolitan song, "Marechiare", the lyrics of which are by the prominent Neapolitan dialect poet, Salvatore Di Giacomo. "Malia", "Ancora" and "Non t'amo piu" were and remain popular concert pieces.

Tosti wrote well for the voice, allowing, indeed encouraging, interpretation and embellishment from operatic singers. Most artists, therefore, specialising in the classical Italian repertoire have performed and recorded Tosti songs; yet Tosti never composed opera. Notable examples on record include Alessandro Moreschi (the only castrato ever recorded) singing "Ideale", Mattia Battistini singing "Ancora", Nellie Melba singing "Mattinata" and Enrico Caruso singing "A vuchella" and "L'alba separa dalla luce l'ombra".

=== Songs ===
- 'A vucchella
- Adieu, My Dear (1887, text by Thomas Carlyle)
- Amour!
- Ancora!
- Aprile
- Ave Maria
- Chanson de l'Adieu
- Chitarrata Abruzzese
- Donna, vorrei morir
- È' morto Pulcinella!
- For ever and for ever!
- Good-Bye! (1880)
- Ideale
- Il pescatore canta
- Il segreto
- L'alba separa dalla luce l'ombra
- L'ultima canzone
- L'ultimo bacio
- La Mia Canzone
- La Rinnovazione
- La serenata
- Lontano dagli occhi
- Luna d'estate
- Lungi
- M'amasti mai?
- Malìa
- Marechiare
- My love and I
- Ninon
- Non mi guardare!
- Non t'amo più!
- O falce di luna calante
- Oblio!
- Oh! quanto io t'amereit!
- Parted
- Patti chiari!
- Penso
- Pierrot's Lament
- Plaintes d'Amour (1876)
- Pour un baiser
- Povera mamma!
- Preghiera
- Preghiera (Alla mente confusa)
- Quattro canzoni di Amaranta
  - Lasciami, lascia ch' io respiri
  - L'alba separa dalla luce l'ombra
  - In van preghi
  - Che dici, o parola del saggio
- Ride bene chi ride l'ultimo
- Ridonami la calma
- Sogno
- T'amo Ancora!
- Tormento
- Tristezza
- Vorrei
- Vorrei morire!
