= Sophie Braslau =

American opera singer

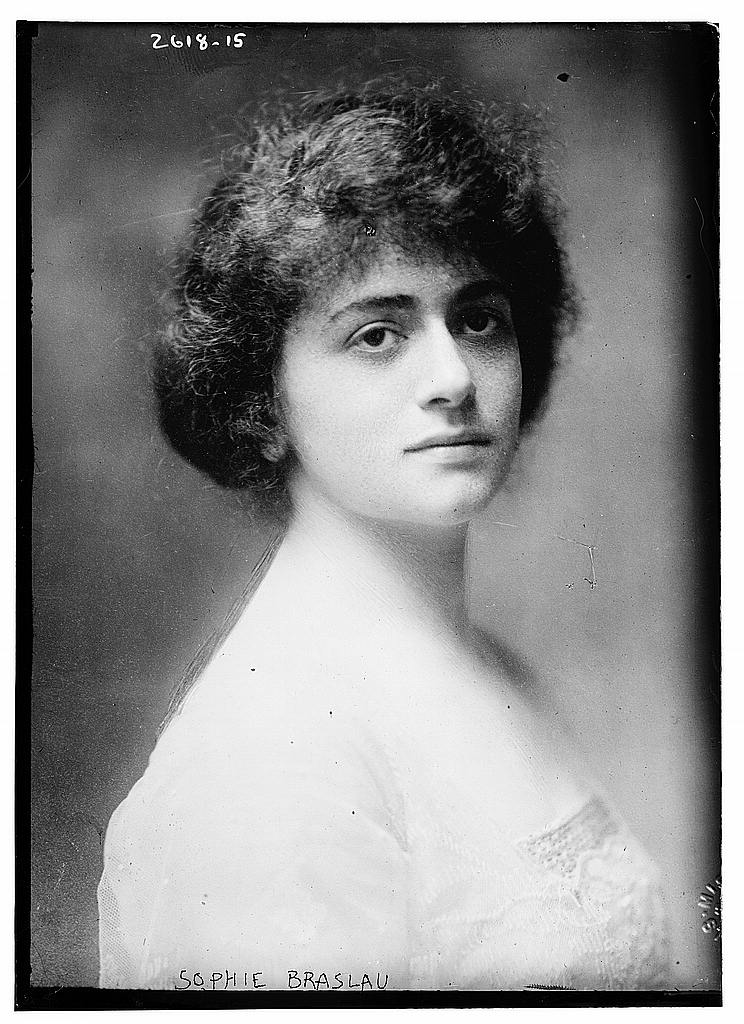
- Braslau circa 1915
- Born: August 16, 1892; Manhattan, New York City
- Died: December 22, 1935 (aged 43); Manhattan, New York City

Sophie Braslau (August 16, 1892 – December 22, 1935) was a dramatic contralto prominent in United States opera, starting with her debut in New York City's Metropolitan Opera in 1913 when she was 21.

== Biography ==
Braslau was born on August 16, 1892, in Manhattan, New York City, to Abel Braslau and Alexandra Goodelman Braslau. (Note: James's Notable American Women, however, gives the year of her birth as 1888 and cites her New York death certificate as the source.)

As a child, Braslau studied piano. Her vocal talent was discovered by voice teacher Arturo Buzzi-Peccia, a family friend, who heard the little girl humming while she practiced piano. Braslau herself claimed to be inspired to a singing career after hearing Alma Gluck, another student of Buzzi-Peccia. She studied with Buzzi-Peccia for three years and then with a number of other instructors. She auditioned for New York's Metropolitan Opera in April 1913, was promptly signed to a contract, and debuted in November of that year. Her first leading role was in 1918 as Shanewis.

Braslau also sang in concert and toured widely and frequently, first in the United States and Canada, then in Europe in the 1920s, using a repertoire which included works in English, French, German, Italian, Russian, and Yiddish.

She retired from her full-time opera career in the late 1920s and performed very little as frail health brought her life to an early close.

Sophie Braslau died of cancer on December 22, 1935, in Manhattan. At her funeral Sergei Rachmaninoff was an honorary pallbearer; the eulogy was delivered by Olin Downes, music critic for The New York Times.

== Recordings ==
Braslau made a number of recordings for the Victor Talking Machine Company and Columbia Records, often featuring her longtime accompanist Louise Bloch; some of the recordings were reissued on LP and CD. Her friendship with George Gershwin led her to record "The Man I Love" for Columbia.
