= Where Are You My Love? =

Where Are You My Love? may refer to:

- "Where Are You My Love", a song by Eddie Low
- "Où es-tu mon amour? (Where Are You, My Love?)", a song written by Emile Stern and Henri Lemarchand in 1946
- ¿Dónde estás amor de mi vida que no te puedo encontrar? (Where Are You My Love, That I Cannot Find You?), a 1992 Argentine drama film

== See also ==
- Are You My Love? (disambiguation)
- "Where Are You Now (My Love)", a 1965 song written by Tony Hatch and Jackie Trent
- "Where Is My Love", a song from the 2006 Cat Power album, The Greatest
