= Santa Lucia luntana =

Song by E. A. Mario

Song
- Language: Neapolitan
- English title: Far Santa Lucia
- Published: 1919
- Genre: Neapolitan song
- Songwriter: E. A. Mario

"Santa Lucia luntana" ("Far Santa Lucia"), sometimes referred to as simply "Santa Lucia", is a Neapolitan song written by E. A. Mario in 1919.

It is very popular in the repertoire of many singers: Mario Lanza (Mario! Lanza at His Best, 1959), Luciano Pavarotti (The Best – Disc 2, 2005), and Russell Watson (Reprise, 2003) recorded notable versions. The song was also recorded by Mario Frangoulis in his CD Passione – Mario sings Mario, recorded in 2007 with the Osipov National Orchestra of Russia, conducted by Vladimir Ponkin.

"Santa Lucia luntana" was on the soundtrack of the 1926 movie Napoli che canta. Another movie, entitled Santa Lucia luntana, was released in 1931.
