= The Student Prince (album) =

Studio album by Mario Lanza
- Released: 1954
- Label: RCA Victor

Mario Lanza chronology
Mario Lanza Sings Songs from M-G-M's Technicolor Motion Picture "Because You're Mine" (1952)	The Student Prince (1954)	Mario Lanza in "Serenade" (1956)

Mario Lanza Sings the Hit Songs from "The Student Prince" and Other Great Musical Comedies, or simply The Student Prince, is an album by tenor Mario Lanza containing songs from the 1954 Metro-Goldwyn-Mayer film The Student Prince that was originally going to feature him in the title role.

== Recording ==
The songs from The Student Prince were recorded by Lanza with an orchestra conducted by Constantine Callinicos. The recording sessions took place at Metro-Goldwyn-Mayer studios in Hollywood in July–August 1952. After Lanza walked off the film and refused to work under the direction of director Curtis Bernhardt, Lanza was eventually fired by MGM and replaced by actor Edmund Purdom, who lip-synched to Lanza's recordings. (One song, "Beloved", had to be re-recorded for use in the film; Lanza returned to MGM to re-record the song on 20 May 1953.)

== Release and reception ==
The album was released by RCA Victor in 1954 in both LP and EP formats (catalog nos. LM-1837 and ERB 1837, respectively). The LP version contained one side of songs not included in the film and was titled Mario Lanza Sings the Hit Songs from "The Student Prince" and Other Great Musical Comedies. The EP version (two records in a gatefold cover) contained only songs from the film and was titled Mario Lanza Sings the Hit Songs from "The Student Prince".

The LP album was listed on Billboard's charts as either just Student Prince (originally) or as Student Prince & Other Great Musical Comedy Hits (in 1959–1960). In 1971, RCA reissued the album in reprocessed stereo sound with new cover art and revised title Mario Lanza Sings Hit Songs From The Student Prince and Other Great Musicals catalog no. LSC-3216(e).

The LP and EP spent several weeks at number one on Billboard's Best Selling Popular Albums chart – on the "LPs" and "EPs" halves of the chart, respectively.

== Track listing ==
12-inch LP (RCA Victor LM 1837; LSC-3216(e))

Side 1
No.	Title	Lyrics	Music	Note(s)	Length
1.	"Orchestral introduction"		Sigmund Romberg	From The Student Prince
2.	"Serenade"	Dorothy Donnelly	Sigmund Romberg	From The Student Prince
3.	"Golden Days"	Dorothy Donnelly	Sigmund Romberg	From The Student Prince
4.	"Drink, Drink, Drink" (with chorus)	Dorothy Donnelly	Sigmund Romberg	From The Student Prince
5.	"Summertime in Heidelberg" (with Elizabeth Doubleday, soprano)	Paul Francis Webster	Nicholas Brodszky	From The Student Prince
6.	"Beloved"	Paul Francis Webster	Nicholas Brodszky	From The Student Prince
7.	"Gaudeamus igitur" (with male chorus)	Traditional	Traditional	From The Student Prince
8.	"Deep in My Heart, Dear" (with Elizabeth Doubleday, soprano)	Dorothy Donnelly	Sigmund Romberg	From The Student Prince
9.	"I'll Walk with God" (with chorus)	Paul Francis Webster	Nicholas Brodszky	From The Student Prince

Side 2
No.	Title	Lyrics	Music	Note(s)	Length
1.	"Yours Is My Heart Alone"		Franz Lehár	From the musical Land of Smiles
2.	"Romance"	Walter Donaldson	Edgar Leslie	From the film Cameo Kirby
3.	"I'll See You Again"	Noël Coward	Noël Coward	From the musical Bittersweet
4.	"If I Loved You"	Oscar Hammerstein II	Richard Rodgers	From the musical Carousel
5.	"I'll Be Seeing You"	Irving Kahal	Sammy Fain	From The Royal Palm Review
6.	"One Night of Love"	Gus Kahn	Victor Schertzinger	From the Columbia film One Night of Love

Album of two EPs (RCA Victor ERB 1837)

Side 1
No.	Title	Length
1.	"Orchestral introduction"
2.	"Serenade"

Side 2
No.	Title	Length
1.	"Golden Days"
2.	"Drink, Drink, Drink"
3.	"Summertime in Heidelberg"

Side 3
No.	Title	Length
1.	"Beloved"
2.	"Gaudeamus igitur"

Side 4
No.	Title	Length
1.	"Deep in My Heart, Dear"
2.	"I'll Walk with God"

== Charts ==
Chart (1954–1955)	Peak position
US Billboard Best Selling Popular Albums – LPs	1
US Billboard Best Selling Popular Albums – EPs	1
Chart (1959–1960)	Peak position
US Billboard Top LPs – Best Selling Monophonic LPs	11

== Certifications ==
Region	Certification	Certified units/sales
United States (RIAA)	Gold	500,000^{^}
^{^} Shipments figures based on certification alone.
