= Old Heidelberg (1923 film) =

1923 film

- Eva May and Paul Hartmann
- German: Alt Heidelberg
- Directed by: Hans Behrendt
- Written by: Wilhelm Meyer-Förster (play); Hans Behrendt
- Produced by: Arzén von Cserépy
- Starring: Paul Hartmann; Eva May; Werner Krauss; Eugen Burg
- Cinematography: Guido Seeber
- Production company: Cserépy Film
- Distributed by: UFA
- Release date: 15 March 1923
- Country: Germany
- Languages: Silent; German intertitles

Old Heidelberg (German: Alt Heidelberg) is a 1923 German silent drama film directed by Hans Behrendt and starring Paul Hartmann, Eva May and Werner Krauss. It was based on the 1901 play of the same name by Wilhelm Meyer-Förster.

== Cast ==
- Paul Hartmann as Erbprinz Karl Heinz
- Eva May as Kaethi
- Werner Krauss as Dr. Jüttner
- Eugen Burg as Lutz, Kammerdiener
- Eugen Rex as Kellermann, Corpsdiener
- Willy Prager
- Karl Harbacher
- Fritz Wendhausen
- Victor Colani
- Albert Bassermann
