= 'A vucchella =

Neapolitan song composed by Paolo Tosti

"'A vucchella" is a Neapolitan song composed by Paolo Tosti. The poet who wrote the words of this song was the 19th century lyric poet, Gabriele D'Annunzio. He was not from Naples, but from Pescara, a city in the region of Abruzzo. With the Neapolitan melodic song tradition being so popular worldwide, D'Annunzio wanted to prove himself able to write in the Neapolitan dialect, and managed to do so quite convincingly for this song, "La vucchella".

One interpretation is that the woman's mouth is like a little rose's petal when it becomes a bit dried out and battered in the cold weather. The poet has turned his gaze on the woman's face and focussed on the woman's mouth, specifically. "'A vucchella" is thus a synecdoche – the part for the whole.

D'Annunzio was known as a lover of women of all ages, so one cannot exclude the possibility that the woman in question, whose rose-like dried mouth the poet was writing about, was in her late forties or even older. The text does not belong to the old Seventeenth/Eighteenth century Neapolitan lyric tradition, and was specially written for Tosti by Gabriele D'Annunzio in the first half of the 1900s.
