= 'O sole mio =

Neapolitan song written in 1898

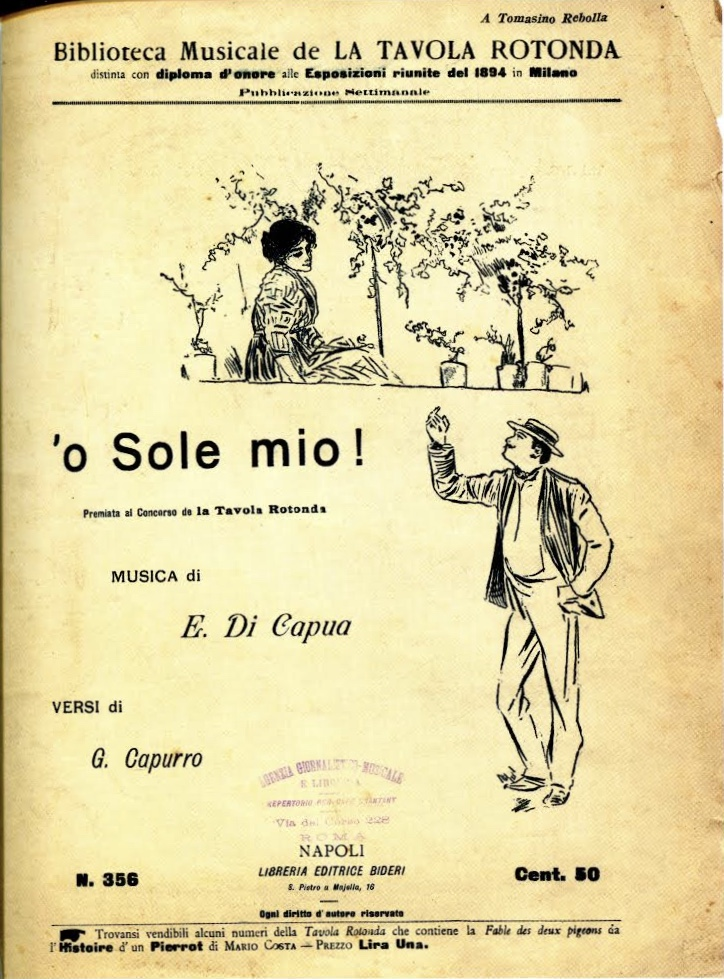
- First edition sheet music cover

Song
- Language: Neapolitan
- Written: 1898
- Composers: Eduardo di Capua; Alfredo Mazzucchi
- Lyricist: Giovanni Capurro

"'O sole mio" (Neapolitan pronunciation: [o ˈsoːlə ˈmiːə]) is a Neapolitan song written in 1898. Its Neapolitan-language lyrics were written by Giovanni Capurro and the music was composed by Eduardo di Capua (1865–1917) and Alfredo Mazzucchi (1878–1972). The title translates literally as "my sun" or "my sunshine". The lyrics have been translated to other languages.

== Authorship and copyright ==
For nearly 75 years after its publication, the music of "'O sole mio" was generally attributed to Eduardo di Capua alone. According to the traditional account, he had composed it in April 1898 in Odessa, while touring with his father's band. It turned out, however, that the melody was an elaboration of one of 23 he had bought from Alfredo Mazzucchi in the preceding year.

In November 1972, shortly after her father's death, Mazzucchi's daughter lodged a declaration with Italy's Office of Literary, Artistic and Scientific Property, which sought to have her father recognised as a co-composer of 18 of di Capua's songs, including "'O sole mio". In October 2002, Maria Alvau, a judge in Turin, upheld the declaration, ruling that Mazzucchi had indeed been a legitimate co-composer of the 18 songs, because they included melodies he had composed and then sold to di Capua in June 1897, with a written authorisation for the latter to make free use of them. At the time of the decision, therefore, "'O sole mio" had not yet entered into the public domain in any country that was a party to the Berne Convention during the relevant period, which it would have done in Italy if di Capua had been the sole composer of the music.

== Lyrics ==
Neapolitan lyrics
English translation

Che bella cosa na jurnata 'e sole,
n'aria serena doppo na tempesta!
Pe' ll'aria fresca pare già na festa...
Che bella cosa na jurnata 'e sole.

Refrain:
Ma n'atu sole cchiù bello, oi ne',
'o sole mio sta nfronte a te!
'o sole, 'o sole mio
sta nfronte a te, sta nfronte a te!

Lùceno 'e llastre d''a fenesta toia;
'na lavannara canta e se ne vanta
e pe' tramente torce, spanne e canta,

lùceno 'e llastre d''a fenesta toia.

(Refrain)

Quanno fa notte e 'o sole se ne scenne,
me vene quasi 'na malincunia;
sotto 'a fenesta toia restarria
quanno fa notte e 'o sole se ne scenne.

(Refrain)

What a beautiful thing is a sunny day!
The air is serene after a storm,
The air is so fresh that it already feels like a celebration.
What a beautiful thing is a sunny day!

But another sun, even more beauteous, oh my sweetheart,
My own sun, is there in your face!
This sun, my own sun,
Is there in your face; It is there in your face!

Your window panes shine;
A laundress is singing and boasting about it;
And while she's wringing the clothes, hanging them up to dry, and singing,
Your window panes shine.

When night comes and the sun has gone down,
I almost start feeling melancholy;
I'd stay below your window
When night comes and the sun has gone down.

== English versions ==
In 1915, Charles W. Harrison recorded the first English version of "'O sole mio". In 1921, William E. Booth-Clibborn wrote lyrics for a hymn using the music, entitled "Down from His Glory".

In 1949 U.S. singer Tony Martin recorded "There's No Tomorrow" with lyrics by Al Hoffman, Leo Corday, and Leon Carr, which used the melody of "'O sole mio". About ten years later, while stationed in West Germany with the U.S. Army, Elvis Presley heard the recording and put to tape a private version of the song. Upon his discharge, he requested that new lyrics be written especially for him, a job that was undertaken by the songwriting duo of Aaron Schroeder and Wally Gold, with a demo by David Hill. The rewritten version was entitled "It's Now or Never" and was a worldwide hit for Presley. When performing it in concert in the mid-1970s, Elvis would explain the origin of "It's Now Or Never" and have singer Sherrill Nielsen perform a few lines of the original Neapolitan version before commencing with his version.

Bing Crosby included the song in a medley on his album 101 Gang Songs (1961). Actor John Schneider also had a hit with it in 1981. It was on the Billboard Pop charts at number 14 and the Country charts at number 4.

In 2026, Scottish singer Susan Boyle released a dance version of the song titled "Just One (ReMAXed Remix)" as part of Cornetto's summer advertising campaign.

== Recordings ==
"'O sole mio", performed by Jānis Vītiņš

"'O sole mio" has been performed and covered by many artists, including Luciano Pavarotti, Enrico Caruso, Rosa Ponselle and her sister Carmella, Andrea Bocelli, Beniamino Gigli, Richard Tucker, Jan Peerce and Mario Lanza. Sergio Franchi recorded this song on his 1962 RCA Victor Red Seal debut album Romantic Italian Songs. Luciano Pavarotti won the 1980 Grammy Award for Best Classical Vocal Performance for his rendition of "'O sole mio".

== Legacy ==
At the opening ceremony of the 1920 Summer Olympics in Antwerp, "'O sole mio" was played in place of the Italian national anthem, whose sheet music had not been delivered to the band.

A series of television commercials for Cornetto ice cream, broadcast regularly in Britain during the 1980s, used a jingle ("Just One Cornetto ...") set to the melody of "'O sole mio". The jingle was widely reported as having been performed by Renato Pagliari, but after Pagliari's death in 2009, his son denied this.

In January 2025 Mark Steyn profiled the song, including its origins, in his Song of the Week series.
