= Fenesta vascia =

Fenesta Vascia (low window) is a popular and ancient Neapolitan song, from 1500, at the time when Naples was part of the Spanish Empire. Its description as "Calascionata" indicates it was to be accompanied by a calascione, a large lute. The lyrics are in Neapolitan language, in a hendecasyllabic meter and the author is unknown. At the beginning of 1800, Giulio Genoino adapted the words to the dialect of his time, and Guglielmo Cottrau wrote the music, which was entirely different from the original melody.

== Lyrics ==
The lyrics are very poetic, and talk about a lover who waits in vain for his cruel beloved to show up at her window. He then mentions his will to become a street water seller, and he says that the water he will sell will not be actual water, but it will be his tears of love. The lyrics have been noted to be difficult to translate into English, in that the original Neapolitan phrasing which is both passionate and sweet may be perceived as harsh and cold in English.
