= Because You're Mine (album) =

Studio album by Mario Lanza
- Released: 1952
- Label: RCA Victor

Mario Lanza chronology
Mario Lanza Sings Christmas Songs (1951)	Because You're Mine (1952)	Mario Lanza Sings the Hit Songs from "The Student Prince" and Other Great Musical Comedies (1954)

Professional ratings
Review scores
Source	Rating
Billboard	90/100

Mario Lanza Sings Songs from M-G-M's Technicolor Motion Picture "Because You're Mine", or simply Because You're Mine, is an album by tenor Mario Lanza containing songs from the 1952 Metro-Goldwyn-Mayer film Because You're Mine.

It was available on 78 rpm (cat. no. DM-7015), 45 rpm (WDM-7015) and 33⅓ rpm (LM-7015).

== Reception ==
Billboard reviewed the album in its issue from 1 November 1952, noting: "[The songs'] variety of style and content permits [Lanza] to display the full range of his vocal equipment, an ample property by most any standard" and concluding: "The set can hardly fail as a profit maker and can be promoted both in the pop and classical categories." The reviewer gave the album 90 points out of possible 100, which indicated a "tops" rating.

The album spent several weeks at number one on Billboard's Best-Selling Pop Albums chart – on the "33⅓ R.P.M." half of it.

== Track listing ==
10-inch LP (RCA Victor LM 7015)

Side 1
No.	Title	Lyrics	Music	Length
1.	"Cavalleria Rusticana: Addio alla madre" ("Turiddu's Farewell")		Pietro Mascagni	3:31
2.	"Granada"	Agustin Lara	Agustin Lara	3:53
3.	"Mamma mia che vo' sape?" ("What My Mother Wants to Know")	Ferdinando Russo	Emanuele Nutile	2:34
4.	"The Lord's Prayer"		Albert Hay Malotte	3:17

Side 2
No.	Title	Lyrics	Music	Length
1.	"Because You're Mine"	Sammy Cahn	Nicholas Brodszky	3:29
2.	"The Song Angels Sing"	Paul Francis Webster	Adapted by Irving Aaronson	3:31
3.	"You Do Something to Me"	Cole Porter	Cole Porter	2:25
4.	"Lee-Ah-Loo"	Lehman	Sinatra	2:49

== Charts ==
Chart (1952)	Peak position
US Billboard Best Selling Popular Albums – 33⅓ R.P.M.	1
US Billboard Best Selling Popular Albums – 45 R.P.M.	2

== Mario Lanza Sings Selections from "Because You're Mine" (EP) ==
There was also an EP titled Mario Lanza Sings Selections from "Because You're Mine" (catalog no. ERA-51).

=== Track listing ===
7-inch EP (RCA Victor ERA-51)

Side 1
No.	Title	Length
1.	"Addio alla madre" ("Turiddu's Farewell")
2.	"Granada"

Side 2
No.	Title	Length
1.	"Mamma mia che vo' sape?" ("What My Mother Wants to Know")
2.	"The Lord's Prayer"
