= Pecché? =

1913 Neapolitan song

Pecché? (pronounced [pəkˈke]; literally "Why?") is a 1913 Neapolitan song composed by Gaetano Enrico Pennino with lyrics by Carlo De Flavis. It was a standard song for Enrico Caruso and Luciano Pavarotti, and is even known in a Soviet version.

The first verse reads:

Canta l'auciello dint' 'â casa antica
Addó primma cantave pure tu.
E sento pur' 'a voce 'e 'n'ata amica
Ca mme cunziglia 'e nun te penzà cchiù!

(In the old house the bird sings, where you once used to sing, too. And I hear as well another female friend's voice, advising me not to stop thinking about you!)

Then follows the refrain which gives the name to song: "Carmela, if I have left my mother for you, if you have taken my early youth, why don't you come back to me?"
