= Mario Lanza: Opera Arias and Duets =

Compilation album by Mario Lanza
- Released: 2001
- Genre: Opera
- Label: RCA Victor

Mario Lanza: Opera Arias and Duets is a compact disc from RCA Victor released October 8, 2001, of recordings re-mastered in 1999. At the time of its release, it was the only all-operatic Mario Lanza CD collection that RCA has issued. It includes several previously unreleased versions of a number of operatic arias associated with Lanza, together with the duet "Dio ti giocondi" from Otello with soprano Licia Albanese, the Improvviso ("Un di all'azzurro spazio") from Andrea Chénier, and "M'appari" from Martha. The CD also includes four recordings from The Mario Lanza Radio Show. Writing in Records and Recordings in October 1967, the critic Delcie C. Howard described Lanza's recording of the Improvviso featured here as "a well-nigh model account of this impassioned outpouring".

== Track listing ==
Mario Lanza: Opera Arias and Duets

1. "Celeste Aida" (from The Mario Lanza Radio Show, 1952)
2. "Amor ti vieta" from Giordano's Fedora (from The Mario Lanza Radio Show, 1952)
3. "Un di, all'azzurro spazio" from Giordano's Andrea Chénier
4. "O soave fanciulla" from Puccini's La bohème (duet with Jean Fenn)
5. "La fleur que tu m'avais jetée" from Bizet's Carmen
6. "O paradiso, sarti de l'onde" from Meyerbeer's L'Africaine
7. "Un tal gioco, credetemi" from Leoncavallo's Pagliacci
8. "Stolta paura, l'amor non uccide ma dà vita" from Puccini's Madama Butterfly (duet with Elaine Malbin)
9. "La donna è mobile" from Verdi's Rigoletto
10. "Vesti la giubba" from Leoncavallo's Pagliacci (from The Mario Lanza Radio Show)
11. "M'appari, tutt'amor" from Flotow's Martha
12. "Nessun dorma" from Puccini's Turandot
13. "Testa adorata" from Leoncavallo's La bohème
14. "Come un bel dì di maggio" from Giordano's Andrea Chénier
15. "Lamento di Federico" from Cilea's L'arlesiana (from The Mario Lanza Radio Show)
16. "Dio ti giocondi" from Verdi's Otello (duet with Licia Albanese)

The recordings on the radio show broadcasts were usually conducted by Constantine Callinicos. The other arias were of Callinicos conducting the Naples Allesandro Scarlotti Orchestra.
