= Emanuele Nutile =

Italian composer

Emanuele Nutile (1862–1932) was an Italian composer, best known for his Neapolitan songs.

== Career ==
Born in Naples, Nutile studied counterpoint and composition with Nicola D'Arienzo. In 1887, he became a music teacher at the music school of the Regio Albergo dei Poveri and started composing romances, tarantelle, minuets and piano compositions. In 1892, he composed his first song, "'E tiempe so' cagnate" ('Times have changed'), which won a music competition held by music publishing house Bideri, and since then he started a successful career as songwriter, achieving success with songs both in Italian and Neapolitan language including "Girulà", "È mezzanotte", "Na' palumella janca", "A gelosia", "Amor di pastorello".

Nutile's major success was "Mamma mia, che vo' sapè", a song he co-wrote with lyricist Ferdinando Russo and that after having been launched by Enrico Caruso became an opera standard.
