= Old Heidelberg (1959 film) =

1959 film directed by Ernst Marischka

- Directed by: Ernst Marischka
- Written by: Wilhelm Meyer-Förster (play); Ernst Marischka
- Produced by: Artur Brauner; Kurt Ulrich
- Starring: Christian Wolff; Gert Fröbe; Sabine Sinjen; Ernst Stahl-Nachbaur
- Cinematography: Bruno Mondi
- Edited by: Jutta Hering
- Music by: Franz Grothe
- Production company: CCC Film
- Distributed by: Deutsche Film Hansa
- Release date: 21 December 1959
- Running time: 108 minutes
- Country: West Germany
- Language: German

Old Heidelberg (German: Alt Heidelberg) is a 1959 West German historical drama film directed by Ernst Marischka and starring Christian Wolff, Gert Fröbe and Sabine Sinjen. It is an adaptation of the 1901 play Old Heidelberg by Wilhelm Meyer-Förster. It was shot at the Spandau Studios in Berlin with sets designed by the art directors Hertha Hareiter and Otto Pischinger.

== Cast ==
- Christian Wolff as Erbprinz Karl-Heinrich
- Gert Fröbe as Dr. Jüttner
- Sabine Sinjen as Käthi
- Ernst Stahl-Nachbaur as Fürst von Sachsen-Karlsburg
- Heinrich Gretler as Gastwirt Rüder
- Rudolf Vogel as Kammerdiener Lutz
- Walter Bluhm as Diener Schölermann
- Siegfried Schürenberg as Staatsminister Haugk
- Tilo von Berlepsch as Kammerherr von Metzing
- Harry Meyen as Graf Detlev v. Asterberg
- Gertie Brugg as Auguste, Serviermädchen
- S. de Calvy as Von Wedell, Student
- Wolfgang Eichberger as Kammerherr von Feldbach
- Hannelore Elsner as Helene, Serviermädchen
- Karin Faber as Anna, Serviermädchen
- Gerd Frickhöffer as Kammerherr von Breitenberg
- Walter Janssen as Hofmarschall im Schloß Karlsburg
- Ludwig Linkmann as Kellermann
- Arthur Schilsky as Engelbrecht, Student
- Heinz Spitzner as Glanz, Lakai des Erbprinzen
- Karl-Heinz Walther as Bilz, Student
- Anneliese Würtz as Frau Rüder

== Bibliography ==
- Bock, Hans-Michael; Bergfelder, Tim, eds. (2009). The Concise Cinegraph: Encyclopaedia of German Cinema. New York: Berghahn Books. ISBN 978-1-57181-655-9.
- Goble, Alan (1999). The Complete Index to Literary Sources in Film. Walter de Gruyter. ISBN 978-3-11-095194-3.
