= Old Heidelberg (1915 film) =

1915 film directed by John Emerson

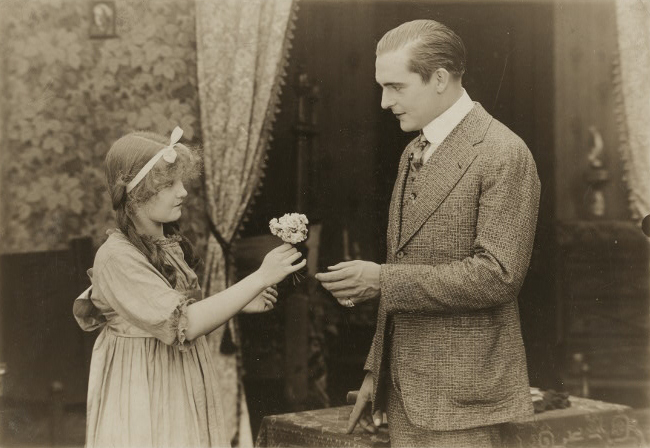
- Scene with co-stars Dorothy Gish and Wallace Reid
- Directed by: John Emerson
- Written by: Wilhelm Meyer-Förster (play); John Emerson; Chester B. Clapp
- Produced by: D. W. Griffith
- Starring: Wallace Reid; Dorothy Gish; Karl Formes; Erich von Stroheim
- Production company: Fine Arts Film Company
- Distributed by: Triangle Distributing
- Release date: November 14, 1915
- Running time: 5 reels
- Country: United States
- Languages: Silent; English intertitles

Old Heidelberg is a 1915 American silent romance film directed by John Emerson and starring Wallace Reid, Dorothy Gish and Karl Formes. Erich von Stroheim had one of his earliest performances for the screen in this movie. It is an adaptation of the 1901 play Old Heidelberg by Wilhelm Meyer-Förster, the first of five film versions which have been made. The film still survives, unlike many productions of the era.

== Cast ==
- Wallace Reid as Prince Karl Heinrich
- Dorothy Gish as Katie Ruder
- Karl Formes as Dr. Juttner
- Erich von Stroheim as Lutz
- Raymond Wells as Karl Bilz
- John McDermott as Von Wendell
- James Gibson as Kellerman
- Franklin Arbuckle as Fritz Ruder - Katie's Father
- Madge Hunt as Frau Hans Ruder - Katie's Aunt
- Erich von Ritzau as Prince Rudolf
- Kate Toncray as Frau Fritz Ruder - Katie's Mother
- Harold Goodwin as Prince Karl - Age 12
- Francis Carpenter as Prince Karl - Age 5

== Bibliography ==
- Lennig, Arthur. Stroheim. University Press of Kentucky, 2004.
