= Lolita (Arturo Buzzi-Peccia song) =

"Lolita", subtitled "Serenata spagnola" ("Spanish Serenade"), is an Italian romance song composed by Arturo Buzzi-Peccia in 1892.

"Lolita" has been recorded by many great singers including Enrico Caruso, Stefano Ballarini, John McCormack, Titta Ruffo, Beniamino Gigli, Richard Tucker, Mario Lanza, and Luciano Pavarotti.
