= Old Heidelberg (play) =

German romantic play by Wilhelm Meyer-Förster

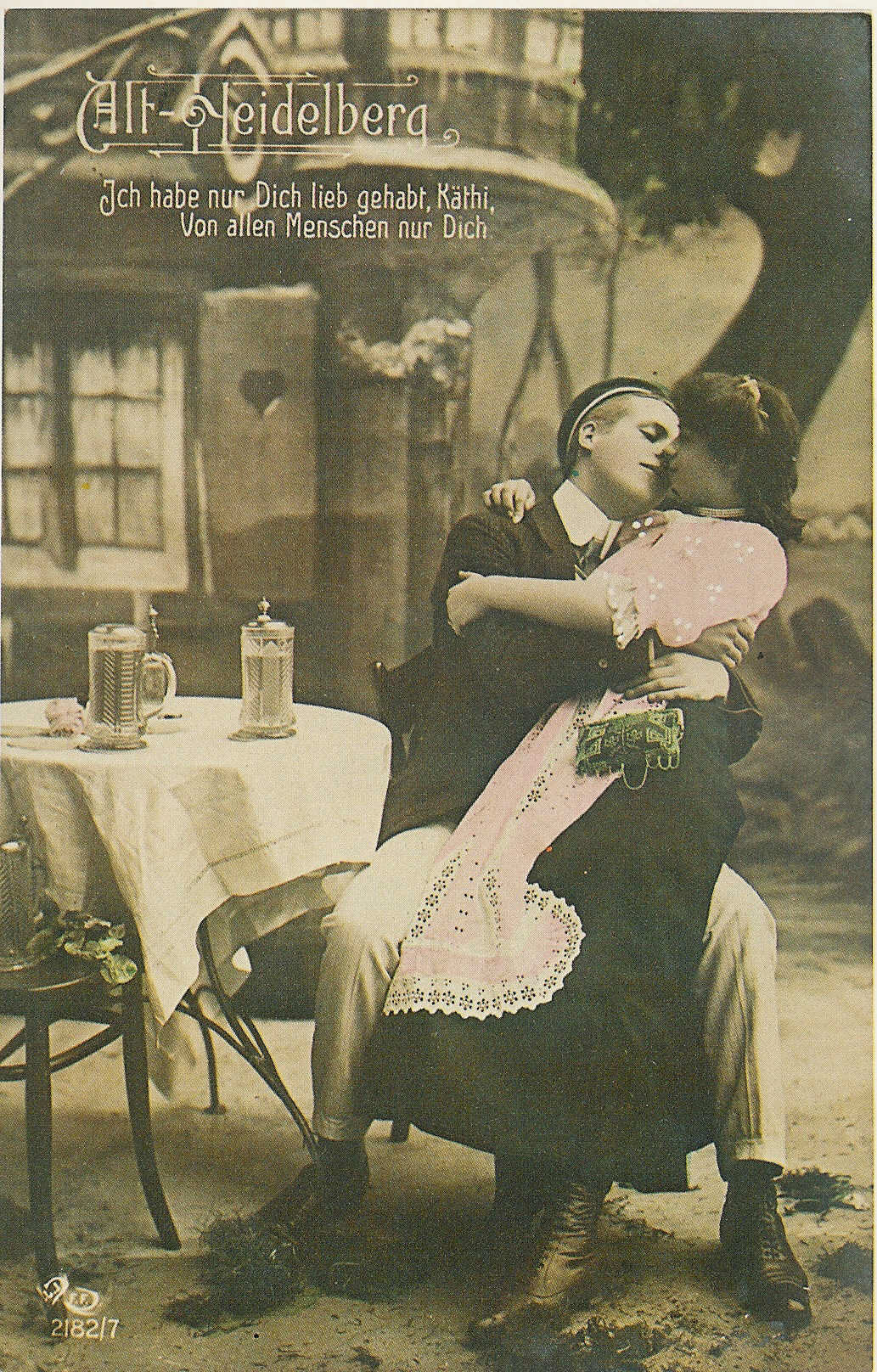
Käthie and the Prince

Old Heidelberg (German: Alt Heidelberg) is a German romantic play by Wilhelm Meyer-Förster first performed in 1901. While studying at the Heidelberg University, Prince Karl from Saxony falls in love with Käthie, an innkeeper's daughter, but has to give her up when his father dies, and he is called to return to his homeland and rule as King.

The play was based on Meyer-Förster's own 1898 novel Karl Heinrich. The play's title alludes to a poem by Joseph Victor von Scheffel. The work was a major international success and became one of the most performed plays in Germany during the first half of the 20th century.

== Adaptations ==
=== Film ===
Owing to the story's popularity it has been turned into films on numerous occasions, including the American silent film Old Heidelberg (1915), the German silent film Old Heidelberg (1923), Ernst Lubitsch's The Student Prince in Old Heidelberg (1926), and Ernst Marischka's Old Heidelberg (1959).

=== Operetta ===
In 1924 the play provided the basis for the 1924 operetta The Student Prince composed by Sigmund Romberg to a libretto by Dorothy Donnelly. The operetta was the basis for the 1954 film The Student Prince.

=== Opera ===
In 1908, the play was the basis for a libretto by Alberto Colantuoni, titled Eidelberga Mia, with music by Ubaldo Pacchierotti; it was later translated into German by Ottoman Piltz in 1909 under the original German title.

== Bibliography ==
- Zacharasiewicz, Waldemar. Images of Germany in American Literature. University of Iowa Press, 2007.
- Everett, William A. & Block, Geoffrey Holden. Sigmund Romberg. Yale University Press, 2007.
