= You Are My Love (1953 song) =

Single by Mario Lanza
- Songwriter(s): Constantine Callinicos
- Lyricist(s): Paul Francis Webster

"You Are My Love" is a song with music by Constantine Callinicos and lyrics by Paul Francis Webster, recorded in 1953 by American tenor Mario Lanza. It was one of four songs Lanza recorded with Callinicos on 17 June 1953, and became a minor hit.

Lanza had been offered the song two years prior but turned it down, leading Callinicos to give it to soprano Marcelle Reale who performed it on tour with the Highland Park Symphony Orchestra. Lanza then paid Callinicos $2,000 for the song, and took several takes to record it to his satisfaction.

Biographers have called the song "a pleasant, if undistinguished number", and that it "[forced] him through the pointless swings into the stentorian singing some critics found tasteless".
