= Serenade (The Student Prince song) =

1924 song from The Student Prince

Single by Mario Lanza

from the album Mario Lanza Sings the Hit Songs from The Student Prince and Other Great Musical Comedies
- A-side: "Deep In My Heart, Dear" "Serenade"
- Released: 1954
- Label: RCA Victor

Audio
- "Serenade" on YouTube

"Serenade" is a song with music by Sigmund Romberg and lyrics by Dorothy Donnelly from the first act of their operetta The Student Prince

In the 1954 MGM film The Student Prince, it was sung by Mario Lanza.

== Track listing ==
All lyrics are written by Dorothy Donnelly; all music is composed by Sigmund Romberg.

7-inch single (RCA Victor Red Seal 49-4218, 1954)
No.	Title	Length
1.	"Deep In My Heart, Dear" (from The Student Prince)
2.	"Serenade" (from The Student Prince)

10-inch 78-r.p.m. shellac record (His Master's Voice D.A. 2065, 1954, UK)
No.	Title	Length
1.	"Serenade" (from The Student Prince)
2.	"Drinking Song" (from The Student Prince)

== Charts ==
Chart (1955)	Peak position
UK Singles (Official Charts)	15
