= Gaudeamus igitur =

Traditional academic song

English: So Let Us Rejoice
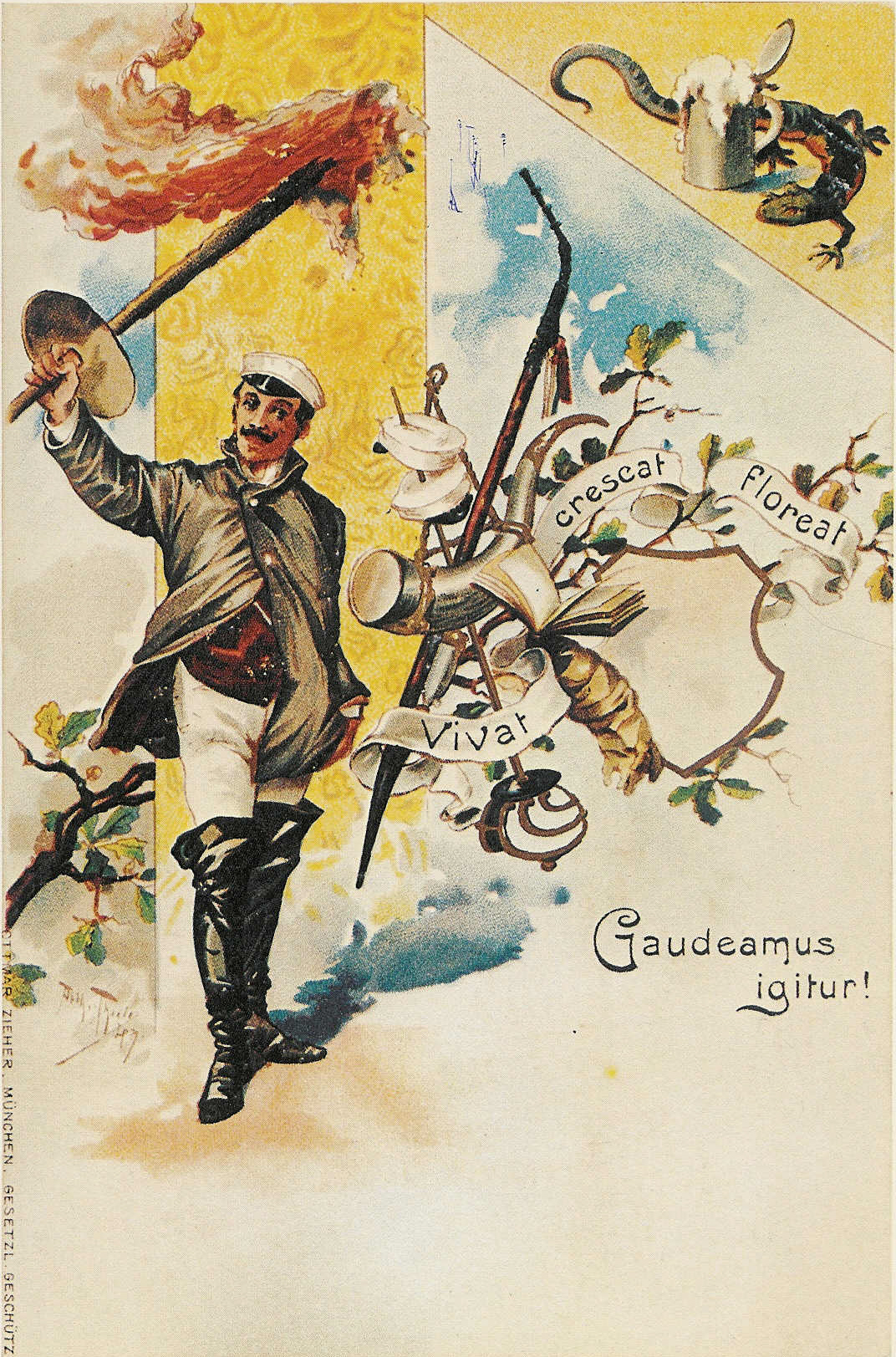
- Postcard with symbols of traditional German student life from 1898
- Official anthem of FISU World University Games and the International University Sports Federation
- Lyrics: Unknown, 1287
- Music: Unknown, 1782
- Adopted: 1959

"Gaudeamus igitur" (Latin for "So let us rejoice") or just "Gaudeamus", also known as "De brevitate vitae" ("On the Shortness of Life"), is a popular academic commercium song in many European countries, mainly sung or performed at university graduation ceremonies. Despite its use as a formal graduation hymn, it is a jocular, light-hearted composition that pokes fun at university life. The song is thought to originate in a Latin manuscript from 1287. It is in the tradition of carpe diem ("seize the day") with its exhortations to enjoy life. It was known as a beer-drinking song at many early universities and is the official song of many schools, colleges, universities, institutions, student societies, and the official anthem of the International University Sports Federation.

== Content ==
The lyrics reflect an endorsement of the bacchanalian mayhem of student life while retaining the knowledge that one day we will all die: memento mori. The song contains humorous and ironic references to sex and death, and many versions bowdlerize the text for performance in public ceremonies. In private, students typically sing ribald words.

The song is sometimes known by its opening words, "Gaudeamus igitur" or simply "Gaudeamus". In the UK, it is sometimes affectionately known as "The Gaudie". The centuries of use have given rise to numerous slightly different versions.

=== Lyrics ===
The proposition that the lyrics originate in 1287 is based on a manuscript held in the Bibliothèque nationale de France in Paris. A poem starting with the words Subscribere proposui ("I have suggested signing (it)") has two verses that closely resemble the later "Gaudeamus igitur" verses, although neither the first verse nor the actual words Gaudeamus igitur appear. The music accompanying this poem bears no relation to the melody now associated with it. A German translation of these verses was made in about 1717 and published in 1730 without music. A Latin version in a handwritten student songbook, dating from sometime between 1723 and 1750, is preserved in the Berlin State Library (formerly at Marburg) but differs considerably from the modern text. The current Latin lyrics with a German translation were published by Halle in 1781 in Studentenlieder ("Students' Songs") by Christian Wilhelm Kindleben, who admitted to making significant changes to the text.

Below is Kindleben's 1781 Latin version, with two English translations (one anonymous, and another by Tr. J. Mark Sugars, 1997). The Neo-Latin word Antiburschius refers to opponents of the 19th-century politically active German student fraternities.

Latin	English (literally)	English (Mark Sugars, 1997)
1. Gaudeamus igitur, Iuvenes dum sumus! Post iucundam iuventutem Post molestam senectutem Nos habebit humus.	So, let us rejoice While we are young. After a pleasant youth After a troublesome old age The earth will have us.	While we're young, let us rejoice, Singing out in gleeful tones; After youth's delightful frolic, And old age (so melancholic!), Earth will cover our bones.
2. Ubi sunt, qui ante nos In mundo fuere, Vadite ad superos, Transite ad inferos, Ubi iam fuere.	Where are they who, before us, Were in the world? Go to the heavens Cross over into hell Where they went through already.	Where are those who trod this globe In the years before us? They in hellish fires below, Or in Heaven's kindly glow, Swell th' eternal chorus.
3. Vita nostra brevis est, Brevi finietur, Venit mors velociter, Rapit nos atrociter, Nemini parcetur.	Our life is brief Soon it will end. Death comes quickly Snatches us cruelly Nobody shall it be spared.	Life is short and all too soon We emit our final gasp; Death ere long is on our back; Terrible is his attack; None escapes his dread grasp.
4. Vivat Academia, Vivant professores, Vivat membrum quodlibet, Vivant membra quaelibet, Semper sint in flore!	Long live the academy! Long live the professors! Long live each student; Long live the whole fraternity; For ever may they flourish!	Long live our academy, Teachers whom we cherish; Long live all the graduates, And the undergraduates; Ever may they flourish.
5. Vivant omnes virgines Faciles, formosae Vivant et mulieres Tenerae, amabiles Bonae, laboriosae.	Long live all virgins, Easy, beautiful! Long live women too, Tender, lovable, Good hard-working.	Long live all the maidens fair, Easy-going, pretty; Long live all good ladies who Are tender and so friendly to Students in this city.
6. Vivat et respublica, Et qui illam regit, Vivat nostra civitas, Maecenatum caritas, Quae nos hic protegit.	Long live the state as well And he who rules it! Long live our city, The charity of benefactors Which protects us here!	Long live our Republic and The gentlefolk who lead us; May the ones who hold the purse Be always ready to disburse Funds required to feed us.
7. Pereat tristitia, Pereant osores, Pereat diabolus, Quivis Antiburschius, Atque irrisores.	May sadness perish! May haters perish! May the devil perish! Whoever opposes the fraternities And their mockers, too!	Down with sadness, down with gloom, Down with all who hate us; Down with those who criticize, Look with envy in their eyes, Scoff, mock and berate us.

=== Music ===
The first appearance in print of the present melody was in Lieder für Freunde der Geselligen Freude ("Songs for Friends of Convivial Joy"), published in Leipzig in 1782, together with Kindleben's German lyrics, but the tune was evidently well known before that. The first publication of the present Latin text together with the present melody was probably in Ignaz Walter's 1797 operatic setting of Goethe's Faust. It is also heard in Berlioz's La Damnation de Faust.

Johannes Brahms quoted the melody in the final section of his Academic Festival Overture, in a fortissimo rendition performed by the full orchestra.

Sigmund Romberg used it in the operetta The Student Prince, which is set at the University of Heidelberg.

It is quoted in Johann Strauss II's "Studenten-Polka" (Française, Op. 263), first performed at the students' ball at the ballroom in the Vienna Hofburg on 24 February 1862.

The tune is quoted, along with other student songs, in the overture of Franz von Suppé's 1863 operetta Flotte Bursche, the action again set at the University of Heidelberg.

Based on the original melody, Franz Liszt composed the "Gaudeamus igitur—Paraphrase" and later (1870) the "Gaudeamus igitur—Humoreske". Pyotr Tchaikovsky made an arrangement for male chorus with piano accompaniment (1874) (TH 187; ČW 413).

== In popular culture ==
H. P. Lovecraft quotes the song in his short story "The Tomb".

Tom Lehrer mentioned the Gaudeamus in his satirical song, "Bright College Days":

Turn on the spigot
Pour the beer and swig it
And gaudeamus igit-itur

In 1979, New England Science Fiction Association member Joe Ross wrote a parody of the song with lyrics referencing the 1955 film This Island Earth. The parody was titled "Haec Insula Terra" (a Latin translation of the film's title) and was published in the first volume of the NESFA Hymnal. Warwick Academy in Bermuda uses part of the lyrics as their school song.

In 1982, the cardiologist John Stone wrote a poem for a graduation address to the Emory University School of Medicine titled "Gaudeamus Igitur." The poem was originally published in JAMA in 1983, and was republished in 2023 with an accompanying commentary.

The song is featured in the Hall of Fame (High Scores) section in the 2003 PopCap video game, Bookworm Deluxe.

On the soundtrack of the 2013 Disney and Pixar film Monsters University, composed by Randy Newman, the instrumental piece "Scare Pig" includes some of "Gaudeamus igitur".

== See also ==
- Ars longa, vita brevis
- Ubi sunt
