= I'll Walk with God =

1954 popular song with music by Nicholas Brodzsky

Single by Mario Lanza

from the album Mario Lanza Sings the Hit Songs from The Student Prince and Other Great Musical Comedies
- A-side: "I'll Walk with God" "Beloved"
- Released: 1954
- Recorded: 1953
- Length: 2:52
- Label: RCA Victor
- Songwriter: Nicholas Brodszky

"I'll Walk with God" is a popular song written for the motion picture The Student Prince with music by Nicholas Brodzsky and lyrics by Paul Francis Webster published in 1954. The film's title character, who was played by actor Edmund Purdom with singing dubbed by tenor Mario Lanza, sings this song at the coffin of his grandfather, the king of Karlsburg. The song was released on The Student Prince soundtrack album issued by RCA Victor.

Mario Lanza re-recorded the song in stereo in 1959.

The song has also been performed or recorded by other tenors including Placido Domingo, Harry Secombe and Michael Crawford.

It also remains popular as a substitute for hymn-tunes in many brass band concert programmes worldwide, in the arrangement by Goff Richards.
