= The Student Prince =

Operetta composed by Sigmund Romberg

The Student Prince is an operetta in a prologue and four acts with music by Sigmund Romberg and book and lyrics by Dorothy Donnelly. It is based on Wilhelm Meyer-Förster's play Old Heidelberg. The piece has a score with some of Romberg's most enduring and beautiful tunes, including "Golden Days", "Drinking Song", "Deep in My Heart, Dear", "Just We Two" and "Serenade" ("Overhead the moon is beaming"). The plot has elements of melodrama but lacks the swashbuckling style common to Romberg's other works.

== Productions and films ==
It opened on December 2, 1924, at Jolson's 59th Street Theatre on Broadway, produced by the Shubert brothers, and became the most successful of Romberg's works, running for 608 performances. It was staged by J. C. Huffman and was the longest-running Broadway show of the 1920s. Even Show Boat, the most enduring musical of the 1920s, did not play as long – it ran for 572 performances. "Drinking Song", with its rousing chorus of "Drink! Drink! Drink!" was especially popular with theatergoers in 1924, as the United States was in the midst of Prohibition. The Shuberts toured the production extensively in America. The original London production at His Majesty's Theatre, opened on February 3, 1926, but was not well received, closing after 96 performances; but the operetta ran for nearly a year in engagements in Sydney and Melbourne Australia in 1927–1928.

The Student Prince was revived twice on Broadway in 1931 and 1943 and in the West End in 1944 and 1968. It was revived extensively elsewhere in the US and UK in the decades following its premiere. In the 1970s and 1980s it was produced in New York by the Light Opera of Manhattan and in 1980 and 1988 by New York City Opera. The operetta was performed each summer at the Heidelberg Castle Festival for several decades beginning in 1974.

Ernst Lubitsch made a silent film also based on Förster's work, titled The Student Prince in Old Heidelberg, starring Ramón Novarro and Norma Shearer. Its orchestral score did not use any of Romberg's score, although it did include "Gaudeamus igitur". Mario Lanza's performance on the soundtrack of the 1954 MGM film The Student Prince renewed the popularity of many of the songs. Composer Nicholas Brodszky and lyricist Paul Francis Webster wrote three new songs for the film. Two of these songs – "I'll Walk with God" and "Beloved", as well as "Serenade" – became closely associated with Lanza, although the role was played on screen by British actor Edmund Purdom, who mimed to Lanza's recordings.

== Roles and original cast ==
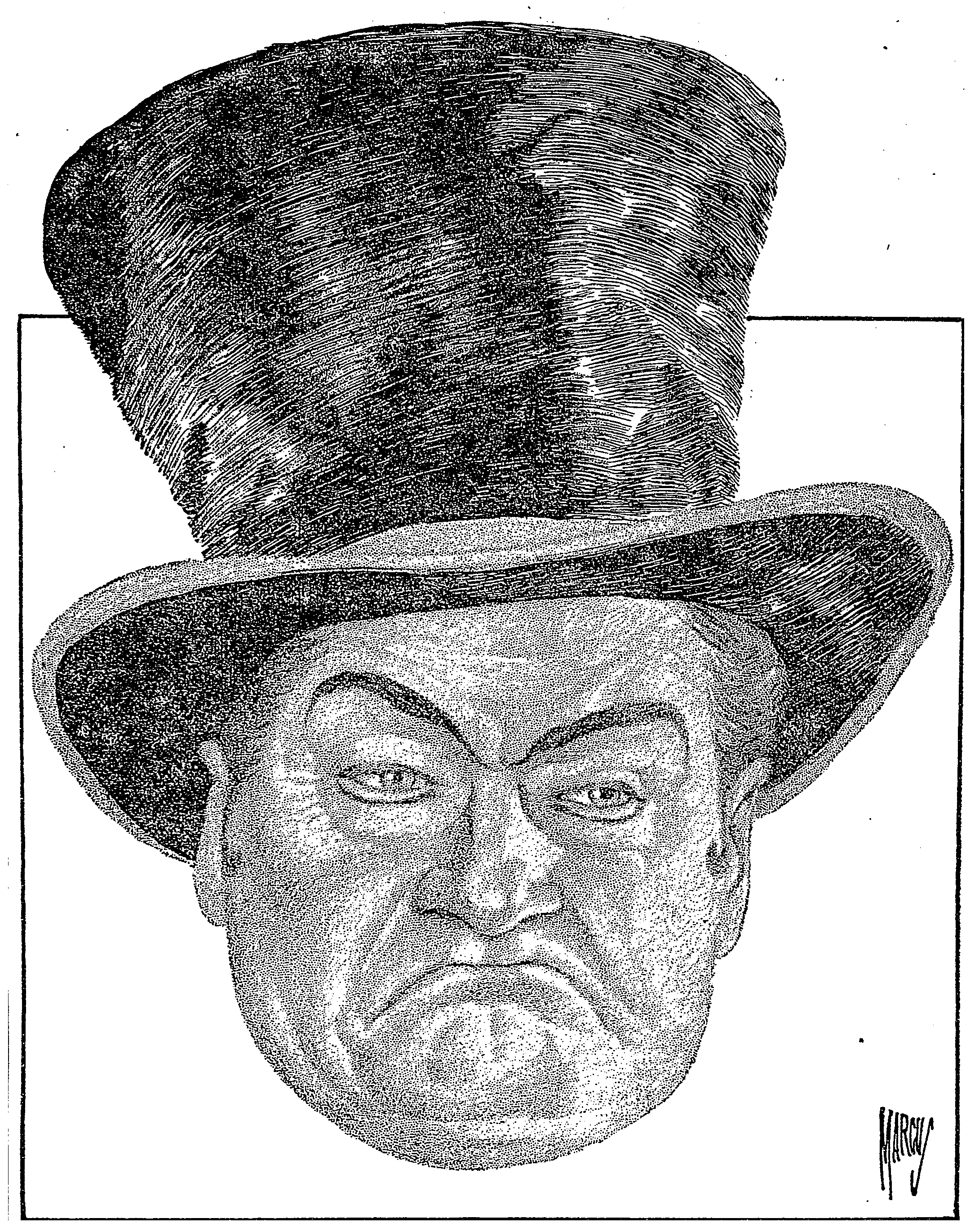
Drawing of George Hassell as Lutz

- Prince Karl Franz – Howard Marsh
- Dr. Engel (the Prince's Tutor) – Greek Evans
- Kathie (niece of Ruder) – Ilse Marvenga
- Ruder (Landlord of Inn of Three Gold Apples) – W. H. White
- Lutz (valet to the Prince) – George Hassell
- Princess Margaret (fiancée of Prince Karl Franz) – Roberta Beatty
- Detlef (a student leader) – Raymond Marlowe
- Von Asterberg (another student leader) – Paul Kleeman
- Lucas (another student leader) – Frederic Wolff
- Captain Tarnitz – John Coast
- Gretchen (a young worker at the tavern) – Violet Carlson
- Hubert (Lutz's valet) – Charles Williams
- Countess Leyden (lady-in-waiting to the Princess) – Dagmar Oakland
- Toni (a waiter and wine steward) – Adolph Link
- Count Von Mark (prime minister of Karlsberg) – Fuller Mellish
- Grand Duchess Anastasia (Princess Margaret's mother) – Florence Morrison
- Rudolph – Lucius Metz
- Baron Arnheim – Robert Calley
- Captain of the Guard – Conrad Sparin
- Nicolas – Fred Wilson

== Synopsis ==
=== Prologue ===
Prince Karl Franz is heir to the (fictitious) German kingdom of Karlsberg. He has grown up fatherless, under rather gloomy military conditions of castle life ("By Our Bearing So Sedate"). He has been educated by tutors, in particular, kindly Doctor Engel, who has taught him the songs of his alma mater, the venerable University of Heidelberg ("Golden Days"). Karl Franz has been promised in marriage, since childhood, to the Princess Margaret (Johanna in some versions), but he has never met her. His grandfather, King Ferdinand, sends him to the university incognito, to live as an ordinary student, and improve his social skills. Karl Franz sets off under the watchful eye of Doctor Engel, accompanied by his snooty valet Lutz, who has his own assistant, Hubert.

=== Act 1 ===
At Heidelberg, Herr Ruder keeps the rustic Inn of Three Gold Apples ("Garlands Bright"). His beautiful niece Kathie waits tables in the inn's beer-garden. The inn is very popular with the students, who go there to drink and sing ("Drink! Drink! Drink!"). Karl Franz, the finicky Lutz and Hubert arrive for the spring term and take rooms at the Three Gold Apples, to the delight of Engel and the disgust of Lutz ("Entrance of the Prince in Heidelberg"). Karl falls in love, almost at first sight, with Kathie, who returns his affection ("Deep in My Heart, Dear"). But he is a royal heir, and she is a commoner.

Karl Franz also makes friends with three students, Detlef, Lucas and von Asterberg, and shares the camaraderie of student life, with nights of enthusiastic drinking and singing. He joins their student corps ("Finale act 1").

=== Act 2 ===
As the term passes, Karl Franz and his friends continue to enjoy student life ("Farmer Jacob Lay-a-Snoring", "Students' Life"). By the end of the term, Karl Franz and Kathie are deeply in love.

But then Karl Franz receives a surprise visit from Princess Margaret and her mother. They bring news that the king is ill and commands the prince to return home for the ceremony of betrothal to the princess. After they leave, Karl Franz and Kathie consider eloping to Paris. But Doctor Engel and Count Von Mark (the prime minister of Karlsberg) remind the prince of his duty to his kingdom. Karl Franz reluctantly agrees to obey the king's command. He promises Kathie that he will return soon ("Finale act 2").

=== Act 3 ===
Back in Karlsberg, two years pass, with Karl Franz unable to return to Heidelberg. His grandfather has died, and Karl Franz is now King. His life is bound up in court ceremony ("Opening act 3"). Princess Margaret has also had a secret relationship with another man, Captain Tarnitz ("Just We Two"). But as King, Karl Franz must honor the betrothal to Margaret ("Gavotte"). Margaret knows that Karl Franz has long pined for an old love, and she has heard rumors that in Heidelberg, he fell in love with a tavernkeeper's niece.

Word arrives from Heidelberg that Doctor Engel has died there. Karl Franz is persuaded to visit Heidelberg for a brief reunion with his old friends, and he hopes to see Kathie again ("What Memories/Finale act 3").

=== Act 4 ===
Princess Margaret goes to Heidelberg first, and secretly visits Kathie. Margaret persuades her that for the good of the kingdom, she must break off with Karl Franz. They agree that Kathie will tell Karl Franz she is in love with another man and is going to marry him. Karl Franz will then finally be free to accept Margaret, who has come to love him. Meanwhile, the students of Heidelberg continue their merry ways ("Let Us Sing a Song", "To the Inn We're Marching, "Overhead the Moon is Beaming ", "Come Boys").

Karl Franz arrives, meets his old friends and visits Kathie. True to her promise, she tells him of her fictitious new love and plans to marry. Karl Franz resolves to marry Margaret without further delay, but Kathie will always be his true love ("Deep in My Heart Dear (reprise)").

== Musical numbers ==
Prologue

- By Our Bearing So Sedate – Four Lackeys
- Golden Days – Prince Karl Franz and Dr. Engel

Act 1

- Garlands Bright – Ruder, Gretchen, Flower Girls and Waitresses
- To the Inn We're Marching/Drink! Drink! Drink!/Come Boys, Let's All Be Gay Boys – Detlef, Von Asterberg, Lucas, Kathie and Students
- Exit of Students: To the Inn We're Marching/Gaudeamus igitur – Detlef, Von Asterberg, Lucas and Students
- Entrance of the Prince in Heidelberg: Golden Days/In Heidelberg Fair – Karl Franz, Dr. Engel, Kathie, Ruder, Gretchen and Girls
- Deep in My Heart, Dear – Karl Franz and Kathie
- Finale act 1: Come Sir, Will You Join Our Noble Saxon Corps/Serenade/Hail Youth and Love/Deep in My Heart, Dear – Karl Franz, Kathie, Detlef, Von Asterberg, Lucas, Dr. Engel, Lutz and Company

Act 2

- Opening act 2: Farmer Jacob (Lay-a-Snoring) – Detlef and Students
- Student Life – Karl Franz, Kathie, Dr. Engel, Gretchen, Detlef, Lucas, Von Asterberg and Eight Students
- Finale act 2: Thoughts Will Come to Me of Days/We're Off to Paris City of Joy/Deep in My Heart, Dear – Karl Franz, Kathie and Dr. Engel

Act 3

- Opening act 3 and ballet: – Ambassadors, Officers, Countess Leyden, Baron Arnheim and Ladies of the Court
- Just We Two – Princess, Captain Tarnitz and Officers
- Gavotte and Karslberg National Anthem – Karl Franz, Princess, Captain Tarnitz, Ambassadors, Officers and Ladies of the Court
- Finale act 3: What Memories/Golden Days/To the Inn We're Marching/Deep in My Heart, Dear – Karl Franz, Dr. Engel, Kathie and Students

Act 4

- Intermezzo
- Opening act 4: Let Us Sing a Song – Students and Girls
- To the Inn We're Marching/Serenade/Come Boys – Students, Detlef and Von Asterberg
- Finale act 4: Deep in My Heart Dear – Karl Franz, Princess, Kathie, Rudolph, Gretchen and Company

== Recordings ==
There are quite a few recordings of this score, though most date from the 1950s. No original Broadway cast recording was made, but the 1926 London cast, starring Marvenga and Allan Prior, did record some selections for EMI. These 78-RPM records have been transferred to CD on the Pearl Label. Earl Wrightson starred in Al Goodman's recording for RCA Victor. This has not been released on CD. The last issue was on the budget label Camden in 1958.

Decca made an album in 1950 with Lauritz Melchior heading the cast in eight selections. This is on CD paired with The Merry Widow. A more complete recording starring Robert Rounseville and Dorothy Kirsten was made by Columbia Records in 1952 and has been re-released on CD. Around the same time, Gordon MacRae recorded a 10-inch Lp of the score for Capitol. It was later repackaged on one side of a 12-inch album (The Merry Widow is on the reverse) but that album has been out-of-print since the late 1960s.

RCA Victor recorded Mario Lanza in highlights from the score, released when the singer's voice was used in the 1954 film version. Lanza later re-recorded the score in stereo for the same label, but it is the earlier mono recording that is on CD paired with selections from The Desert Song.

Reader's Digest include a selection in their album A Treasury of Great Operettas, first offered for sale in 1963. This stereo recording is available on CD. Also in 1963, as part of a series of stereo recordings of classic operettas, Capitol had MacRae and Kirsten record a full album of the score. Most of it can be heard on the EMI CD Music of Sigmund Romberg along with selections from The Desert Song and The New Moon. Around the same time, Columbia made a new stereo recording with Giorgio Tozzi, Jan Peerce and Roberta Peters. This has not been issued on CD.

The 1989 2-CD set from That's Entertainment (TER/JAY) includes much of the underscoring; it features Norman Bailey, Marilyn Hill Smith, Diana Montague and David Rendall, and is conducted by John Owen Edwards.

A recording was released by CPO in 2012 with WDR Rundfunkchor Köln and WDR Funkhausorchester Köln, conducted by John Mauceri. Dominik Wortig sings Karl-Franz, Anja Petersen is Kathie, Frank Blees is Dr. Engel, Theresa Nelles is Princess Margaret and Christian Sturm is Captain Tarnitz.

== Influence ==
The operetta was influential in its portrayal of European Studentenverbindungen (student fraternities). The historian Marianne Rachel Sanua wrote:

[T]he model of the Central European student fraternity, which included beer-drinking, good fellowship, heated discussion, and physical recreation as well as political activity, had its appeal to American young men, especially those who had the opportunity to study in the universities of Germany, Austria, or Czechoslovakia. Novels and the popular operetta The Student Prince, set in the German university town of Heidelberg, fixed in the public mind the heroism, joys, and glamour of European student fraternity life.
