= The Student Prince in Old Heidelberg =

1927 film directed by Ernst Lubitsch

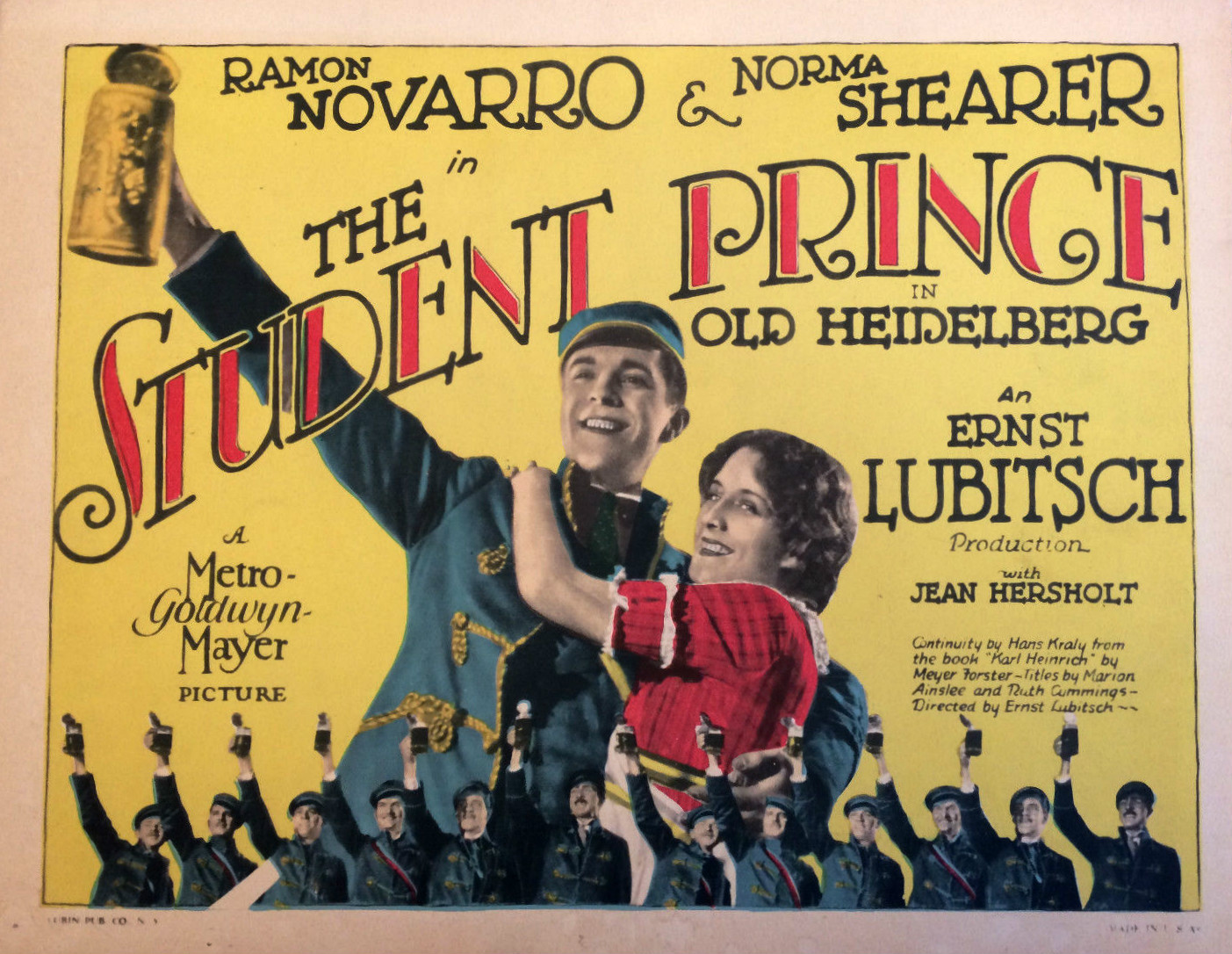
- Lobby card
- Directed by: Ernst Lubitsch
- Written by: Hanns Kräly (Continuity); Ruth Cummings (intertitles); Marian Ainslee (intertitles)
- Based on: Old Heidelberg; 1904 play by Wilhelm Meyer-Förster
- Produced by: Ernst Lubitsch
- Starring: Ramon Novarro; Norma Shearer
- Cinematography: John J. Mescall
- Edited by: Andrew Marton
- Music by: William Axt; David Mendoza; Carl Davis (Thames Television version)
- Distributed by: Metro-Goldwyn-Mayer
- Release dates: September 21, 1927 (U.S.); September 10, 1928 (Germany)
- Running time: 105 minutes
- Country: United States
- Language: Silent (English intertitles)
- Budget: $1,205,000
- Box office: $1,566,000 (worldwide rentals)

The Student Prince in Old Heidelberg, also known as The Student Prince and Old Heidelberg, is a 1927 Metro-Goldwyn-Mayer silent drama film based on the 1901 play Old Heidelberg by Wilhelm Meyer-Förster. It was directed by Ernst Lubitsch, and stars Ramon Novarro and Norma Shearer.

== Plot ==
Young Crown Prince Karl Heinrich, heir to the kingdom of Karlsburg (a fictional sovereign state of the German Confederation), is brought to live with his stern uncle, King Karl VII. The king immediately dismisses the boy's nanny without telling the youngster to avoid an emotional farewell. Dr. Friedrich Jüttner, his new tutor, proves to be sympathetic, and they become lifelong friends. Nonetheless, despite the commoners' belief that it must be wonderful to be him, the boy grows up lonely, without playmates his own age.

Upon passing his high school examination in 1901 with the help of Dr.Jüttner, the young prince is delighted to learn that both he and Jüttner are being sent to Heidelberg, where he will continue his education. When they arrive, Karl's servant is appalled at the rooms provided for the prince and Jüttner at the inn of Ruder (Otis Harlan). When Ruder's niece Kathi stoutly defends the centuries-old family business, Karl is entranced by her, and decides to stay. He is quickly made a member of Corps Saxonia, a student society.

Later that day, Karl tries to kiss Kathi, only to learn that she is engaged. Her family approves of her fiance, but she is not so sure about him. She eventually confesses to Karl that, despite the vast social gulf between them, she has fallen in love with him. Karl feels the same about her and swears that he will let nothing separate them. When he takes her boating, their rower, Johann Kellermann, turns his back to them to give them some privacy. Karl jokingly tells him that, when he is king, he will make Kellermann his majordomo.

Then Jüttner receives a letter from the king informing Karl that he has selected a princess for him to marry. Jüttner cannot bring himself to destroy his friend's happiness. That same day, however, Prime Minister von Haugk arrives with the news that the king is seriously ill, and that Karl must go home and take up the reins of government. When Karl sees his uncle, he is told of the matrimonial plans. While Karl is still reeling from the shock, the old king dies, followed by Jüttner.

Later, von Haugk presses the new monarch about the marriage. The anguished Karl signs the document for the wedding. Then Kellermann shows up to take the job Karl had offered him. When Karl asks him about Kathi, he learns that she is still waiting for him. He goes to see her one last time.

In the last scene, Karl is shown riding through the streets in a carriage with his bride. One onlooker remarks that it must be wonderful to be king, unaware of Karl's misery.

== Cast ==
- Ramon Novarro as Crown Prince Karl Heinrich
- Norma Shearer as Kathi
- Jean Hersholt as Dr. Friedrich Jüttner
- Gustav von Seyffertitz as King Karl VII
- Philippe De Lacy as Young Karl
- Edgar Norton as Lutz
- Bobby Mack as Johann Kellermann
- Edward Connelly as Prime Minister von Haugk
- Otis Harlan as Old Ruder
- André Mattoni as Count Asterberg (uncredited)
- Hans Joby as Student (credited as John S. Peters)
- George K. Arthur as Drunk Student (uncredited)
- Edythe Chapman as Young Karl's nanny (uncredited)

== Production ==
Irving Thalberg initially planned to have Erich von Stroheim direct this film as a follow-up to the director's commercial success The Merry Widow. Stroheim declined, opting instead to leave MGM and begin work on The Wedding March (1928). Thalberg then tried to attach E.A. Dupont, and then John S. Robertson to the project, but both passed on it. He settled on thirty-four-year-old German émigré Ernst Lubitsch.

Novarro was cast after John Gilbert was considered. Lubitsch felt that both Novarro and Shearer were miscast, but was unable to override the studio's casting decisions. Lubitsch's insistence on multiple takes and minimal rehearsal time were hard on both leads. Shearer even complained to Thalberg, her fiance, about Lubitsch's penchant for acting out scenes for the actors before they were shot. Thalberg told her that "everyone has a lot to learn from Lubitsch."

The love scene in the beer garden, which is acclaimed as one of the best scenes in the film by modern critics, was allegedly a headache for the director, who had it reshot entirely, but was still unhappy with it. It was rumored that the love scene in the film was reshot by John M. Stahl, but Lubitsch's assistant on the film, Andrew Marton, denied this. According to director King Vidor, Lubitsch also made Novarro film "a buddy scene with an effeminate extra" in the hopes of "playing up the charge between them." Novarro, no doubt, was extremely uncomfortable doing the scene and resentful of being put in that situation by the director; Novarro was extremely guarded about his own homosexuality his entire life.

The film was in production for more than 108 days and cost $1,205,000. A stickler for authenticity, Lubitsch drove up the budget significantly, infuriating the studio. For instance, he had costume designer Ali Hubert bring thirty-two trunks of wardrobe and props from Europe for use in the film. Following principal photography, he went to Germany to film establishing shots, none of which were used in the finished movie; what little location work there is in the finished film was shot in Laurel Canyon.

== Reception ==
Although now considered a classic by many film historians, it was far from a unanimous critical success during its original theatrical run. In a review for The New York Times, Mordaunt Hall wrote "Mr. Novarro is natural and earnest, but he is a little too Latin in appearance for the rôle. Norma Shearer is attractive as Kathi. She, however, does not seem to put her soul into the part. She, too, acts well, but, like Mr. Novarro, she does not respond, as other players have done, to Mr. Lubitsch's direction. The ablest acting in this piece of work is done by Jean Hersholt as Dr. Guttner [sic] and Gustav von Seyffertitz as the King. Their efforts in all their scenes reveal their sensitiveness to the direction."

According to MGM records, The Student Prince in Old Heidelberg earned $894,000 in theater rentals from the United States and Canada and an additional $662,000 from foreign rentals. Despite being a popular film with movie-goers, the exorbitant production cost of Student Prince kept it from making a profit; the film lost $307,000.

== Impact ==
Many critics consider it one of Lubitsch's finest silent films, and it has received better reviews than MGM's 1954 color remake based on Sigmund Romberg's operetta version of the story.

The film's copyright was renewed, but the film fell into the public domain on January 1, 2023.
