= Drinking Song =

Song composed by Sigmund Romberg

Single by Mario Lanza

from the album Mario Lanza Sings the Hit Songs from The Student Prince and Other Great Musical Comedies
- A-side: "Serenade" "Drinking Song"
- Released: 1954
- Label: RCA Victor

"Drinking Song" or "Drink, Drink, Drink" is an exuberant song composed by Sigmund Romberg with lyrics by Dorothy Donnelly. It is the most popular piece in the 1924 operetta, The Student Prince. It was a success for tenor Mario Lanza, who recorded it for the 1954 movie and was released on vinyl that same year. Lanza was originally scheduled to play the lead role, but during production Lanza and the studio parted ways. Edmund Purdom was brought in as a replacement however Purdom lip-synced over Lanza's recordings during the musical performances in the film.

Rich Stewart, who goes by the stage name Homebrew Stew, placed this song at the number three position for both his list of The Top 86 Drinking Songs in Modern Drunkard and book featuring an expanded rundown of 151 songs about drinking.

The song was used in a bar room commercial promoting the virtues of drinking water. The campaign was named Drink More Water – Aquafina for PepsiCo produced by BBDO in 2004.
