= Wilhelm Meyer-Förster =

German novelist and playwright (1862–1934)

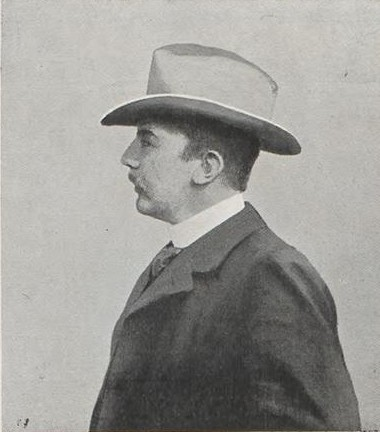
Wilhelm Meyer-Förster

Wilhelm Meyer-Förster, also known as Samar Gregorow (12 June 1862, Hannover, Kingdom of Hanover – 17 March 1934, Heringsdorf), was a German novelist and playwright.

== Biography ==
The son of a bookseller, he first studied law, then the history of art. He later decided upon a literary career. From 1890 to 1898, he lived in Paris, then in Berlin. At the age of 23, he wrote his first novel. He also wrote many plays. He reached his height of popularity at the beginning of the 20th century.

Alt Heidelberg (Old Heidelberg in English), his best-known work, was adapted many times on film and as the Sigmund Romberg operetta The Student Prince.

== Works ==
- 1885 Die Saxo-Saxonen (novel)
- 1897 Die Fahrt um die Erde (novel)
- 1898 Alltagsleute (novel)
- 1901 Heidenstamm (novel)
- 1901 Old Heidelberg (play)
- 1903 Elschen auf der Universität
- 1923 Durchlaucht v. Gleichenberg (novel)
