= Taking a Chance on Love (album) =

Studio album by Jane Monheit
- Released: September 7, 2004
- Recorded: March 13, 2004–May 10, 2004
- Genre: Vocal jazz, pop standards
- Label: Sony Classical
- Producer: Peter Asher, Al Schmitt

Jane Monheit chronology
Live at the Rainbow Room (2003)	Taking a Chance on Love (2004)	The Season (2005)

Singles from Taking a Chance on Love
- 1. "Taking a Chance on Love"; 2. "Over the Rainbow"; 3. "Honeysuckle Rose"; 4. "I Won't Dance"

Professional ratings
Review scores
Source	Rating
USA Today	3/4 stars
People	2.5/4 stars
Pittsburgh Tribune-Review	2.5/5 stars
Down Beat	4/5 stars
All About Jazz Italy	3/5 stars
Allmusic	4/5 stars
Los Angeles Daily News	4/5 stars
JazzTimes	(favorable)
Jazz Now	(favorable)
Seattle Weekly	(favorable)

Taking a Chance on Love is an album by American jazz singer Jane Monheit that includes cover versions of standards and songs from musicals. The album was released on September 7, 2004, via Sony Classical label.

== Background ==
This was Monheit's fifth album and fourth studio album, her first album with Sony. Taking a Chance on Love was her first collaboration with Grammy Award-winning producers Peter Asher and Al Schmitt. She sang on the album Session 55 by Les Brown, which Schmitt produced.

During the album's first week of release, it entered the pop chart on Billboard magazine and reached number one on the Traditional Jazz chart. The song "Dancing in the Dark" received a Grammy Award nomination for Best Instrumental Arrangement Accompanying Vocals.

Monheit recorded "Honeysuckle Rose" with Wynton Marsalis on the album In Full Swing by Mark O'Connor. The bonus track "Over the Rainbow" appeared on the soundtrack Sky Captain and the World of Tomorrow. The bonus track "I Should Care" is from Legends of Jazz with Ramsey Lewis: Season One, Vol. 2 (2006).

== Track listing ==
No.	Title	Writer(s)	Musical	Length
1.	"Honeysuckle Rose"	Andy Razaf, Fats Waller	Thousands Cheer (1943)	3:39
2.	"In the Still of the Night"	Cole Porter	Rosalie (1928)	5:06
3.	"Taking a Chance on Love"	Vernon Duke, John Latouche, Ted Fetter	Cabin in the Sky (1940)	3:19
4.	"Bill"	Jerome Kern, P. G. Wodehouse, Oscar Hammerstein II	Show Boat (1927)	5:16
5.	"I Won't Dance" (duet with Michael Bublé)	Jerome Kern, Otto Harbach, Oscar Hammerstein II, Jimmy McHugh, Dorothy Fields	Three Sisters (1934) / Roberta (1935)	3:36
6.	"Too Late Now"	Alan Jay Lerner, Burton Lane	Royal Wedding (1951)	5:21
7.	"Why Can't You Behave?"	Cole Porter	Kiss Me, Kate (1948)	4:08
8.	"Do I Love You?"	Cole Porter	Du Barry Was a Lady (1939)	4:53
9.	"Love Me or Leave Me"	Gus Kahn, Walter Donaldson	Whoopee! (1928) / Love Me or Leave Me (1955)	3:34
10.	"Embraceable You"	George Gershwin, Ira Gershwin	Girl Crazy (1930)	3:47
11.	"Dancing in the Dark"	Howard Dietz, Arthur Schwartz	The Band Wagon (1931)	5:04
12.	"Over the Rainbow" (bonus track) (from Sky Captain and the World of Tomorrow OST)	Harold Arlen, E.Y. Harburg	The Wizard of Oz (1939)	3:54

Target Edition bonus tracks
No.	Title	Writer(s)	Musical	Length
13.	"I Should Care"	Sammy Cahn, Axel Stordahl, Paul Weston	Thrill of a Romance (1945)	3:42
14.	"I Wish I Were in Love Again"	Richard Rodgers, Lorenz Hart	Babes in Arms (1937) / Words and Music (1948)	2:54

UK Edition / Chinese Edition bonus track
No.	Title	Writer(s)	Musical	Length
9.	"I Should Care"	Sammy Cahn, Axel Stordahl, Paul Weston	Thrill of a Romance (1945)	3:42

Japanese Edition bonus tracks
No.	Title	Writer(s)	Musical	Length
9.	"I Should Care"	Sammy Cahn, Axel Stordahl, Paul Weston	Thrill of a Romance (1945)	3:42
13.	"I Wish I Were in Love Again"	Richard Rodgers, Lorenz Hart	Babes in Arms (1937) / Words and Music (1948)	2:54

German Edition bonus tracks
No.	Title	Writer(s)	Musical	Length
9.	"I Should Care"	Sammy Cahn, Axel Stordahl, Paul Weston	Thrill of a Romance (1945)	3:42
14.	"I Wish I Were in Love Again"	Richard Rodgers, Lorenz Hart	Babes in Arms (1937) / Words and Music (1948)	2:54

== EP releases ==
A four-track EP and a two-track EP release of Monheit's album Taking a Chance on Love were released as limited editions in 2004.

Taking a Chance on Love (4-track EP)
No.	Title	Length
1.	"Honeysuckle Rose"	3:39
2.	"In the Still of the Night"	5:06
3.	"Taking a Chance On Love"	3:19
4.	"Over the Rainbow"	3:54

Taking a Chance on Love (2-track EP)
No.	Title	Length
1.	"Honeysuckle Rose"	3:39
2.	"In the Still of the Night"	5:06

== Chart positions ==
Year	Chart	Position
2004	Billboard Top Jazz Albums	1
2004	The Billboard 200	94
2004	Billboard Top Internet Albums	94
2004	Portuguese Charts	13

== Personnel ==
- Jane Monheit – vocals
- Michael Bublé – vocals
- Geoffrey Keezer – piano
- Romero Lubambo, Miles Okazaki – guitar
- Ron Carter, Christian McBride, Orlando le Fleming – bass guitar
- Rick Montalbano, Lewis Nash – drums
- Michael Kanan, Rob Mounsey – piano, arranger
- Joel Frahm – alto, soprano, and tenor saxophone
- Donald Harrison – alto saxophone
- Michael Davis, Lawrence Feldman, Jim Hynes, Bob Malach, Roger Rosenberg, Andy Snitzer, Lew Soloff, David Taylor – horn

=== Technical ===
- Peter Asher – producer
- Laraine Perri – producer
- Al Schmitt – producer, engineer, mixing
- Brian Montgomery – engineer
- Vince Mendoza – arranger, conductor
- Alan Broadbent – arranger, conductor
- Jorge Calandrelli – arranger, conductor
- Edward Shearmur – arranger, conductor
- Joe Soldo – conductor
