= 42nd Street Moon =

American theatre company in San Francisco

- Formation: 1993
- Type: Theatre group
- Location: 215 Jackson St, San Francisco, California
- Website: https://42ndstmoon.org/

42nd Street Moon is a professional theatre company in San Francisco, California. The company specializes in the preservation and presentation of early and lesser-known works by Rodgers & Hammerstein, Rodgers & Hart, Cole Porter, Irving Berlin, Kurt Weill, George and Ira Gershwin, Jerome Kern, Jerry Bock, Sheldon Harnick, Kander and Ebb, Jule Styne and Comden and Green. In recent years, the company has branched out to include more contemporary works that continue the spirit of the classic American Musical.

MoonSchool at 42nd Street Moon is the education branch of the professional company, offering high-level theatre training for children, teens, and adults.

== History ==
The company was founded by Greg MacKellan and Stephanie Rhoads in 1993. It has presented the American premiere of musical scores by Jerome Kern (Three Sisters and The Cabaret Girl) and Johnny Mercer (The Good Companions). 42nd Street Moon also produced the first American revivals of Rodgers & Hart's 1926 musical Peggy-Ann and André Previn's Coco. For its first 15 seasons, the company presented its productions as staged concerts. In 2008, it began to produce "fully staged" musicals, with costumes and choreography. For example, the production of Strike Up the Band in 2011 had choreography by Alex Hsu and costumes reviewed as "to-die-for 1920s attire" by Scarlett Kellum.

Two of 42nd Street Moon's productions have been recorded as Cast albums: Cole Porter's Something for the Boys and Leave it to Me. Both represent the first full English language records for either of these two musicals, with Leave It to Me being sponsored in part by the National Endowment for the Arts. Videos of most of 42nd Street Moon's productions are available for viewing at the Museum of Performance & Design in San Francisco.

Artistic Director MacKellan has led developed several musical salons, each dedicated to exploring and celebrating the work of some of Broadway's greatest songwriters. In 2013, Once In Love With Loesser was performed, in celebration of Frank Loesser and built around the three stages of his career: as a Tin Pan Alley lyricist, then working in Hollywood, and finally as a Broadway songwriter. MacKellan retired from Moon in June, 2016.

Notable actors and actress who have worked with 42nd Street Moon include: Darren Criss (Fanny – 1997, Do I Hear a Waltz – 1998, Babes in Arms – 1999); Andrea Marcovicci (On a Clear Day – 1999, Coco – 2007–08); Ann Morrison (Can-Can – 2004–05); Lea DeLaria (Once Upon a Mattress – 2004–05); Klea Blackhurst (Red Hot and Blue – 2005–06, Call Me Madam – 2009–10); and Jason Graae (Little Me – 2012–13). Brent Barrett, Leslie Caron, Emily Skinner, Cady Huffman, Rebecca Luker, Andrea McArdle, Donna McKechnie, Marni Nixon, Noah Racey, Charles Strouse, and Karen Ziemba have also performed in concerts or galas with the company.

In 2016, Daren A.C. Carollo and Daniel Thomas were appointed Co-Executive Directors of 42nd Street Moon.

In 2019, Anne Norland was named Director of Education for MoonSchool.

In 2020, Catalina Kumiski was named Director of Marketing.

== Productions ==
- 1993: Jubilee; One Touch of Venus; Oh, Lady! Lady!!; Fifty Million Frenchmen; Sweet Adeline; DuBarry Was a Lady
- 1994: Peggy-Ann; The Cat and the Fiddle; Hollywood Pinafore; Something for the Boys; Darling of the Day; As Thousands Cheer
- 1995: A Connecticut Yankee; Pipe Dream; America's Sweetheart; Very Warm for May; I Married an Angel; Three Sisters; The Great Revues (revue); Once in a Blue Moon (revue); Nobody's Heart (Rodgers & Hart revue); The Song is You (Oscar Hammerstein, II revue)
- 1996: Silk Stockings; Dearest Enemy; Goodtime Charley; The Night Boat; Roberta; Lady, Be Good!; Love and Nuts and Noodles (revue); Something Sort of Grandish (Yip Harburg revue)
- 1997: Face the Music; Louisiana Purchase; High Spirits; Fanny; Something for the Boys; Jubilee; I'd Like to Hide It (revue)
- 1998: Do I Hear a Waltz?; Girl Crazy; Redhead; A Tree Grows in Brooklyn; Nymph Errant; Call Me Madam; Fabulous Flops (revue)
- 1999: Fiorello!; Sitting Pretty; On a Clear Day; Let's Face It!; The Grass Harp; Babes in Arms; A Century of Musicals (revue)
- 2000: Funny Face; Out of This World; The Good Companions; Dear World; I Married an Angel; Jazz Up Your Lingerie! (revue)
- 2001: It's a Bird, It's a Plane, It's Superman!; The Cat and the Fiddle; Do Re Mi; Goldilocks; Leave It to Me!; Guess What's Under My Umbrella (revue)
- 2002: By Jupiter; Pipe Dream; A Connecticut Yankee; Peggy-Ann; Too Many Girls
- 2003: Paint Your Wagon; Roberta; Finian's Rainbow; Oh Captain!; Fifty Million Frenchman;
- 2004–05: Gentlemen Prefer Blondes; The Cabaret Girl; Can-Can; Hooray for What!; Once Upon a Mattress; Minnie's Boys; The Boys from Syracuse
- 2005–06: Red Hot and Blue!; Miss Liberty; The Roar of the Greasepaint; The Golden Apple; Mack & Mabel
- 2006–07: Li'l Abner; Pardon My English; Flora the Red Menace; Plain and Fancy; Gay Divorce
- 2007–08: One Touch of Venus; Oh, Lady! Lady!!; The Student Gypsy or "The Prince of Liederkranz"; Coco; Peddling Rainbows (Harburg revue); Out of This World
- 2008–09: Irma La Douce; Girl Crazy; Ben Franklin in Paris; High Spirits; Wildcat!;
- 2009–10: Call Me Madam; Destry Rides Again; I Feel a Song Coming On; Jubilee; Nice Work If You Can Get It; Lady, Be Good!; Very Warm for May; Everything The Traffic Will Allow: The Songs and Sass of Ethel Merman
- 2010–11: A Funny Thing Happened On the Way to the Forum; Once in a Million Moons; Murder for Two: A Killer Musical; Babes in Arms, And All That Jazz; Strike Up the Band; Silk Stockings
- 2011–12: Nymph Errant; Oh, Kay!; Three Sisters; Sugar; Zorba
- 2012–13: Of Thee I Sing; Carmelina; Pal Joey; Carnival!; Little Me
- 2013–14: It's a Bird...It's a Plane...It's Superman; I Married an Angel; Snoopy!!!; Painting the Clouds with Sunshine; DuBarry Was a Lady
- 2014–15: Do I Hear a Waltz?; The Boy Friend; Something for the Boys; Nick and Nora; Where's Charley?
- 2015–16: Sail Away; Scrooge in Love!; The Boys from Syracuse; The Most Happy Fella
- 2016–17: Baker Street; Scrooge in Love!; New Girl in Town; No No Nanette
- 2017–18: Ain't Misbehavin; The Secret Garden; Saturday Night; Me and My Girl
- 2018–19: The Best Little Whorehouse in Texas, Dames at Sea, Fiorello!, 110 in the Shade, Once, The Oldest Living Cater Waiter
  - Summer of 2019 MoonSchool: Aladdin Kids and Wonderland: Alice's Rock & Roll Adventure
- 2019–20: Titanic (in Concert), Hot Mikado, Scrooge in Love!, A Gentleman's Guide to Love and Murder, The Pajama Game, Merrily We Roll Along (The 1981 Musical) and Merrily We Roll Along (The 1934 Play) presented in repertory as part of the Back to Back Series and The Sondheim Sweep
