= Triola (disambiguation) =

The Triola is a children's musical instrument.

Triola may also refer to:

- Anne Triola (1920–2012), American singer, musician, and actress
- Michelle Triola (1932–2009), American actress
- Triola, a pseudonym of Jörg Burger (born 1962), German electronic music artist
