= Lullaby of Broadway =

Lullaby of Broadway can refer to:

- "Lullaby of Broadway" (song), a popular song with music by Harry Warren and lyrics by Al Dubin, published in 1935
- Lullaby of Broadway (film), a 1951 movie with Doris Day, in which she sings the song
- Lullaby of Broadway (album), a 1951 album by Doris Day, of songs from the movie
