= Without Reservations =

1946 film by Mervyn LeRoy

- Theatrical release poster
- Directed by: Mervyn LeRoy
- Written by: Andrew Solt
- Based on: Thanks, God! I'll Take It From Here by Jane Allen; Mae Livingston
- Produced by: Jesse L. Lasky Jr. Walter MacEwen
- Starring: Claudette Colbert; John Wayne; Don DeFore; Anne Triola; Louella Parsons
- Cinematography: Milton R. Krasner
- Edited by: Jack Ruggiero
- Music by: Roy Webb
- Production company: RKO Pictures
- Distributed by: RKO Pictures
- Release date: May 13, 1946
- Running time: 107 minutes
- Country: United States
- Language: English
- Budget: $1,683,000 (estimated)
- Box office: $3,000,000 (US rentals)

Without Reservations is a 1946 RKO Radio Pictures American comedy film directed by Mervyn LeRoy and starring Claudette Colbert, John Wayne and Don DeFore. The film was adapted by Andrew Solt from the novel Thanks, God! I'll Take It From Here by Jane Allen and Mae Livingston.

== Plot ==
Successful author Christopher "Kit" Madden is traveling to Los Angeles to work on the film adaptation of her bestselling book Here is Tomorrow, which was supposed to star Cary Grant as the Army Air Forces pilot hero Mark Winston. But she receives word that Grant has withdrawn and the producer now wants an unknown actor to play Winston opposite Lana Turner. Kit, on the train to Hollywood, is writing the producer that she'll accept nobody but Grant to star as Winston when she meets two Marine pilots, captain "Rusty" Thomas and first lieutenant "Dink" Watson, and instantly considers Rusty the best choice to play Winston. But he is dismissive of her book and says it is a political allegory, and that he does not believe that Grant would refuse Turner's advances for 400 pages. Unsure how he will react if he discovers that she is a famous writer, Kit keeps her identity secret, saying that her name is Kitty Kloch.

After she is expelled from the train for drunkenness in a remote prairie town, and the two men join her, they trade Rusty's German war souvenir helmet for a car. They are welcomed at the farm of a large Hispanic family whose daughter showers attention on Rusty, but they flee following a misunderstanding which Madden intentionally causes. When Rusty finally learns Kit's true identity after bailing her out of jail for cashing a check which the hotel believed was under a false identity, he thinks that she has been using him just so that he will appear in the film. However, after weeks pass while she tries to make Rusty jealous by appearing in newspapers with other men, Rusty eventually reaches Hollywood and they resolve their differences.

== Cast ==
- Claudette Colbert as Christopher "Kit" Madden
- John Wayne as Capt. "Rusty" Thomas
- Don DeFore as 1st Lt. "Dink" Watson
- Anne Triola as Consuela "Connie" Callaghan
- Phil Brown as Soldier
- Frank Puglia as Ortega
- Thurston Hall as Henry Baldwin
- Dona Drake as Dolores Ortega
- Fernando Alvarado as Mexican Boy
- Charles Arnt as Salesman
- Louella Parsons as Herself
- Frank Wilcox as Jack
- Sam McDaniel as Freddy
- Lisa Golm as Alma

Cast notes:

- Jack Benny, Dolores Moran, Raymond Burr and Cary Grant make uncredited cameo appearances, as does director Mervyn LeRoy.

== Production ==
The film was originally budgeted at $1.1 million and was titled Thanks, God! I'll Take it from Here.

The Arrowhead Pictures motion-picture studio shown in the opening shot is the actual RKO Radio Pictures building at 780 Gower Street in Hollywood.

== Box office ==
The film returned a profit of $342,000.

== Critical reception ==
Variety wrote: "Mervyn LeRoy’s direction doesn’t miss a bet in underlying the laughs with a solid feeling of reality".

The New York Times wrote: "But in spite of its repetitive nature and some painfully contrived sequences, there is a great deal in Without Reservations that is glib and engaging fun".

== See also ==
- John Wayne filmography
