= Lovely to Look At =

1952 film by Mervyn LeRoy

Lovely to Look At (1952)
- Theatrical release Blu-Ray
- Directed by: Mervyn LeRoy
- Screenplay by: George Wells; Harry Ruby; Andrew Solt (additional dialogue)
- Based on: Roberta; 1933 musical by Jerome Kern; Otto Harbach
- Produced by: Jack Cummings
- Starring: Kathryn Grayson; Red Skelton; Howard Keel; Marge Champion; Gower Champion; Ann Miller
- Cinematography: George J. Folsey
- Edited by: John McSweeney Jr.
- Music by: Carmen Dragon; Saul Chaplin
- Color process: Technicolor
- Distributed by: Metro-Goldwyn-Mayer
- Release date: May 29, 1952 (New York)
- Running time: 102 minutes
- Country: United States (Center Audio)
- Language: English (Center Audio)
- Budget: $2.8 million
- Box office: $3.8 million

Lovely to Look At is a 1952 American musical romantic comedy film directed by Mervyn LeRoy, and starring Kathryn Grayson, Red Skelton and Howard Keel. It is based on the 1933 Broadway musical Roberta, which also served as the source for the 1935 film Roberta.

== Plot ==
Broadway producers Al Marsh, Tony Naylor and Jerry Ralby are desperately searching for investors to finance their new show, but the potential investors lack startup funds. Al learns that his aunt Roberta has died and has left him half of her dress salon business. With their own funds, the producers travel to Paris to sell Al's share of the shop.

In Paris, Al meets sisters Stephanie and Clarisse, Roberta's adopted daughters who own the other half of the dress shop. After the men learn that the dress shop is in severe debt, they plan to expand the business with a lavish nightclub featuring fashion shows. Al withholds the idea from Stephanie, knowing that she would disapprove. Jerry, attracted to Clarisse, proposes glamorizing her fashion designs. Tony informs Stephanie of the nightclub idea, but she objects, feeling that their creditors would not approve. During the creditors' meeting, Tony demands that they finance the nightclub.

Bubbles Cassidy, a performer from the Broadway show, arrives and resumes her relationship with Tony, which disappoints Stephanie as she has fallen in love with him. At the nightclub, the three couples, along with Zsa Zsa and her friend Max Fogelsby, enjoy champagne together and Tony and Stephanie dance together, infuriating Bubbles. Al leaves with Bubbles and develops an attraction to her. Stephanie leaves with Tony on a hansom cab and they kiss. Jerry and Clarisse dance together and realize their mutual attraction. The next morning, Tony arrives but Stephanie has a hangover and has forgotten the previous night's events. Tony reminds her of their kiss and they admit their love for each other.

The producers invite investors to Al's comedy routine. Max offers to finance the Broadway show in New York, which delights Tony but disappoints Stephanie, as Tony feels torn between her and his desire to finance the show.

Tony returns to New York but feels guilty for betraying his friends. He withdraws from producing the show, which has stalled in its progress. Max understands Tony's feelings and sends him back to Paris to help the struggling fashion show finale. Tony apologizes to his friends and helps to prepare the finale, which is a success.

== Cast ==
- Kathryn Grayson as Stephanie
- Red Skelton as Al Marsh
- Howard Keel as Tony Naylor
- Marge Champion as Clarisse
- Gower Champion as Jerry Ralby
- Ann Miller as Bubbles Cassidy
- Zsa Zsa Gabor as Zsa Zsa
- Kurt Kasznar as Max Fogelsby
- Marcel Dalio as Pierre
- Diane Cassidy as Diane

== Production ==
The film was originally announced as a vehicle for Gene Kelly and Frank Sinatra, who had previously teamed together for Anchors Aweigh (1945), Take Me Out to the Ball Game (1949) and On the Town (1949). The intended female stars were Judy Garland and Betty Garrett.

The film bears little resemblance to the Roberta Broadway show or 1935 film other than its musical score and the plot point of the inherited dress shop.

The finale fashion show was directed by Vincente Minnelli with costumes by Adrian, who designed more than 40 costumes for the film at a cost of $100,000.

== Songs ==
The film's music was written by Jerome Kern.

- "Smoke Gets in Your Eyes", sung by Kathryn Grayson and later danced by Marge and Gower Champion; lyrics by Otto A. Harbach and Dorothy Fields.
- "Lovely to Look At", sung by Kathryn Grayson and Howard Keel; lyrics by Dorothy Fields. The song had been nominated for an Academy Award for its appearance in the 1935 version of Roberta.
- "The Touch of Your Hand", sung by Kathryn Grayson; lyrics by Otto A. Harbach.
- "I Won't Dance", sung and danced by Marge and Gower Champion; lyrics by Oscar Hammerstein II and Dorothy Fields.
- "Yesterdays", sung by Kathryn Grayson; lyrics by Harbach.
- "You're Devastating", sung by Howard Keel and Kathryn Grayson; lyrics by Harbach.
- "I'll Be Hard to Handle", sung and danced by Ann Miller and men's chorus; lyrics by Bernard Dougall.
- "Lafayette", performed by Howard Keel, Red Skelton and Gower Champion.

== Reception ==
In a contemporary review for The New York Times, critic A. H. Weiler called the film "a shade duller than the original" and wrote:

[T]he saga, and/or changes therein, may be ignored with the slightest of ease, since the producers, who have not spared the Technicolor, also have used the full and wonderful complement of tunes from the sturdy score. Thus, only the tone deaf can be apathetic to Kathryn Grayson and Howard Keel's rendition of "You're Devastating" or "The Touch of Your Hand". ... Although all of the dance numbers choreographed by Hermes Pan are not inspired, he has inventively devised spirited turns for "I Won't Dance" and "Smoke Gets in Your Eyes" to which Marge and Gower Champion contribute professional grace, verve and charm. ... Naturally, no self-respecting producer with a couturiere's salon, a sorority of eye-catching mannequins and a celebrated fashion designer on his hands, would let such assets go to waste. And Adrian has not let his chiefs down. ... That, and the songs, should excite every distaff customer in the house and undoubtedly the gentlemen will go for it too. But watch out for that plot!"

According to MGM records, the film earned $2,571,000 in the United States and Canada, and $1,203,000 elsewhere, resulting in an overall loss of $735,000.
