= Seven Sweethearts =

1942 film by Frank Borzage

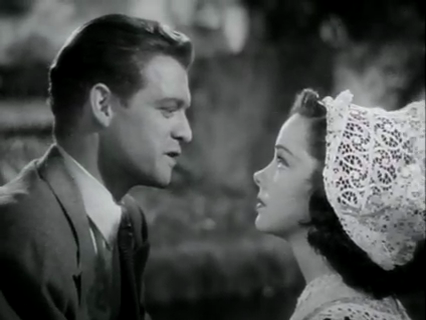
- Van Heflin and Kathryn Grayson
- Directed by: Frank Borzage
- Screenplay by: Walter Reisch; Leo Townsend
- Based on: Seven Sisters; 1903 play by Ferenc Herczeg
- Produced by: Frank Borzage; Joe Pasternak
- Starring: Kathryn Grayson; Marsha Hunt; Cecilia Parker; Van Heflin
- Cinematography: George J. Folsey; Leonard Smith (uncredited)
- Edited by: Blanche Sewell
- Music by: Franz Waxman
- Production company: Metro-Goldwyn-Mayer
- Distributed by: Loew's Inc.
- Release date: November 13, 1942
- Running time: 98 min.
- Country: United States
- Language: English
- Budget: $752,000
- Box office: $1,686,000

Seven Sweethearts is a 1942 musical film directed by Frank Borzage and starring Kathryn Grayson, Marsha Hunt and Van Heflin.

In 1949, Hungarian playwright Ferenc Herczeg sued MGM, producer Joe Pasternak and screenwriters Walter Reisch and Leo Townsend for $200,000 alleging that they had plagiarized Herczeg's 1903 play Seven Sisters, which Paramount Pictures had adapted into the 1915 film The Seven Sisters, starring Madge Evans. The case was settled out-of-court for a "substantial" amount.

Kathryn Grayson's real-life sister Frances Raeburn plays Cornelius.

== Plot ==
Photojournalist Henry Taggart is in Little Delft, Michigan, to do a story on the local tulip festival. He stays at a hotel run by Mr. Van Maaster and operated by his daughters. While rain delays his plan to take local photographs, he becomes acquainted with the hotel's staff and guests.

The oldest daughter, Regina, who is indulged by her father and thinks that every man in town is in love with her, wants to move to New York to become an actress. She assumes that Henry, as a journalist, must have connections in the theater business so she cozies up to him, but Henry falls for the youngest sister, Billie. By family tradition, the oldest of his seven daughters must marry first; the other sisters and their beaus are hopeful that Henry will marry Regina.

Henry pursues Billie, despite Regina's machinations, and convinces Billie that he wants to marry her. Henry approaches Mr. Van Maaster, but the hotelier jumps to the conclusion that Henry is speaking of marrying Regina. Regina tells Henry that he must take her to New York and set her up there before pursuing Billie, warning him that her influence over their father can prevent his marriage to Billie. Henry tells Billie that he wants her to run away with him immediately, but she refuses for fear of upsetting her father and sends Henry away. Mr. Van Maaster is perturbed by Billie's unhappiness.

Regina runs away to New York and summons Henry to her hotel, but her father shows up before Henry arrives. Mr. Van Maaster tells Regina that he will support her becoming an actress, but that she must study acting properly at a school first, live in a women's boarding house, and be chaperoned by Mrs. Robbins and Mr. Randall, two long-term residents of his hotel. When Henry arrives, Mr. Van Maaster asks him to marry Billie and welcomes him to the family as the son he never had. Soon after, the seven sisters are married in the same ceremony, Regina having decided to marry Mr. Randall to escape the women's boarding house.

== Cast ==
The sisters:

- Kathryn Grayson as Billie Van Maaster
- Marsha Hunt as Regina 'Reggie' Van Maaster
- Cecilia Parker as Victor Van Maaster
- Peggy Moran as Albert 'Al' Van Maaster
- Dorothy Morris as Peter Van Maaster
- Frances Rafferty as George Van Maaster
- Frances Raeburn as Cornelius Van Maaster

Their beaus:

- Van Heflin as Henry Taggart
- Carl Esmond as Carl Randall
- Michael Butler as Bernard Groton, Peter's Beau
- Cliff Danielson as Martin Leyden, Victor's Beau
- William Roberts as Anthony Vreeland, Cornelius's Beau
- James Warren as Theodore Vaney, Albert's Beau
- Dick Simmons as Paul Brandt, George's Beau

Other characters:

- S. Z. Sakall as Mr. Van Maaster, the Father
- Diana Lewis as Mrs. Nugent
- Lewis Howard as Mr. Nugent
- Isobel Elsom as Miss Abagail Robbins
- Donald Meek as Reverend Howgan
- Louise Beavers as Petunia

== Music ==
Although sometimes tagged as a musical, all the songs in the film are diegetic, with no unheard accompaniment to the songs, and all with Billie as soloist. They include an English version ("There Is a Dreamboat on High") of a berceuse (Wiegenlied/lullaby), long attributed (and in the film) to Mozart, but it was in fact composed by Friedrich Fleischmann (Schlafe, mein Prinzchen, schlaf ein, 1799).

A scene in which a pianist lodger plays a melody to lull the hotelier to sleep features "Rock-a-bye Baby", derived from the English ballad "Lillibullero", itself derived from the quickstep section of a march by Henry Purcell. At a climactic moment in the tulip festival the aria "Je suis Titania" (from the French opera Mignon) is heard. Other songs featuring Kathryn Grayson as soloist include "You and the Waltz and I", and "Little Tingle Tangle Toes", both written by the team of Walter Jurmann (music) and Paul Francis Webster (lyrics), and "Tulip Time", by Burton Lane (music) and Ralph Freed (lyrics).

== Reception ==
According to MGM records the film earned $638,000 in the U.S. and Canada and $1,048,000 worldwide (a rarity for MGM, as most films earned more money domestically until after World War II) for a profit of $364,000.
