= Thunder on the Hill =

1951 film by Douglas Sirk

- Directed by: Douglas Sirk
- Written by: Oscar Saul; Andrew Solt; Charlotte Hastings (play)
- Produced by: Michael Kraike
- Starring: Claudette Colbert; Ann Blyth
- Cinematography: William H. Daniels
- Edited by: Ted J. Kent
- Music by: Hans J. Salter
- Color process: Black and white
- Production company: Universal Pictures
- Distributed by: Universal Pictures
- Release date: October 17, 1951 (United States)
- Running time: 84 minutes
- Country: United States
- Language: English
- Budget: $2.5 million

Thunder on the Hill is a 1951 American film noir crime film directed by Douglas Sirk and starring Claudette Colbert and Ann Blyth. The picture was made by Universal-International Pictures and produced by Michael Kraike from a screenplay by Oscar Saul and Andrew Solt, based on the play Bonaventure by Charlotte Hastings. The music score was by Hans J. Salter and the cinematography by William H. Daniels.

Thunder on the Hill was first announced as a Universal-International Pictures project in August 1947, with plans for Robert Siodmak to direct, Joseph Sistrom to produce and with Joan Fontaine and Burt Lancaster starring. The production for Thunder on the Hill was postponed to allow Lancaster to film All My Sons, and while Fontaine filmed Letter from an Unknown Woman, her first movie through her own film production company Rampart Productions (co-owned with her husband William Dozier). Thunder on the Hill was postponed again, to the autumn of 1948, this time to allow for the filming of Kiss the Blood Off My Hands, starring both Fontaine and Lancaster, which was to be immediately followed by Rampart Productions' second film, You Gotta Stay Happy (co-starring Fontaine and James Stewart). Due to Fontaine's announced pregnancy during the filming of Kiss the Blood Off My Hands, the filming of Thunder on the Hill was again pushed back, this time to January 1949; by then the entire production team and its stars had been replaced.

== Plot ==
Sister Mary Bonaventure is in charge of the hospital ward of a convent in the county of Norfolk, England. She is troubled by her own sister's suicide, which she confides to her Mother Superior.

A torrential rain closes nearby roads, causing Sergeant Melling of the police to bring condemned murderer Valerie Carns there. She is being taken to prison.

Valerie was convicted of poisoning her brother Jason, a pianist. Jason's physician, Dr. Jeffreys, is head of the hospital where Sister Mary now works. Valerie still proclaims her innocence, but Jeffreys insists that she gave Jason a fatal overdose of his medicine.

A photograph of Jason clearly disturbs Isabel Jeffreys, the doctor's wife. He gives her a sedative. Valerie appeals to Sister Mary to bring her fiancé, Sidney Kingham, to the convent to see her. A servant tells Sister Mary about the sadistic behaviour of Jason Carns and produces a love letter to him, clearly written by Isabel.

Mother Superior is upset by Sister Mary's meddling. She burns the letter. The nun still intends to tell Melling the police sergeant what she knows.

Dr. Jeffreys is the one who gave Jason the fatal dose, and he might be slowly poisoning Isabel as well. He lures Sister Mary to a bell tower, where he attacks her. She rings the bell. Sidney hears it, rushes to her aid and overpowers Jeffreys, who is arrested by Melling.

Sister Mary's faith is restored, believing the rain that delivered Valerie to her to be divine intervention.

== Cast ==
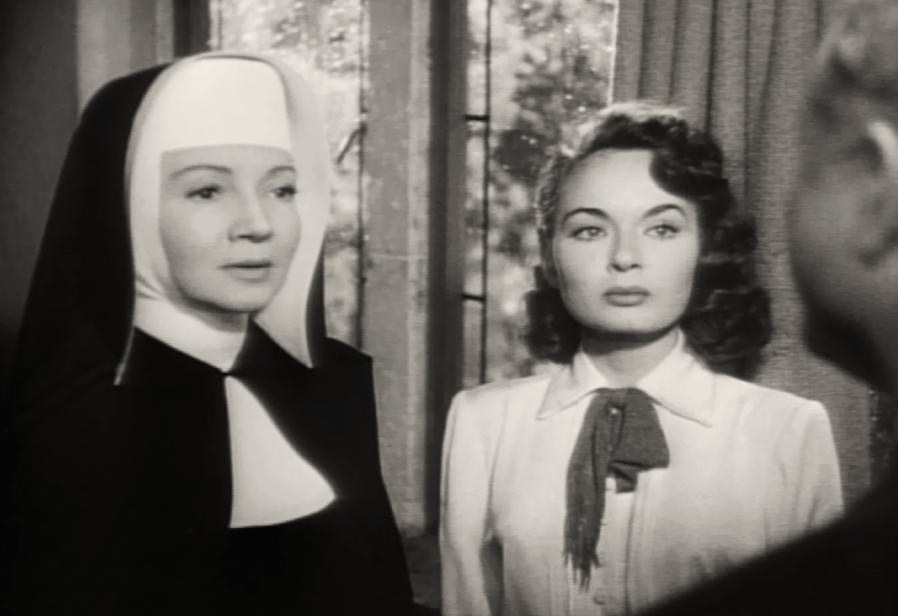
Claudette Colbert (Sister Mary) and Ann Blyth (Valerie Carns)

- Claudette Colbert as Sister Mary
- Ann Blyth as Valerie Carns
- Robert Douglas as Dr. Jeffreys
- Anne Crawford as Isabel Jeffreys
- Philip Friend as Sidney Kingham
- Gladys Cooper as Mother Superior
- Michael Pate as Willie
- John Abbott as Abel Harmer
- Connie Gilchrist as Sister Josephine
- Gavin Muir as Melling
- Phyllis Stanley as Nurse Phillips
- Norma Varden as Pierce
- Valerie Cardew as Nurse Colby
- Queenie Leonard as Mrs. Smithson
- Patrick O'Moore as Mr. Smithson
- Alma Lawton as Nurse Brent (uncredited)

== Home media ==
The film was released on a Region A Blu-ray in North America by Kino Lorber as part of their Film Noir: The Dark Side of Cinema II box set.
