= The Vanishing Virginian =

1942 film by Frank Borzage

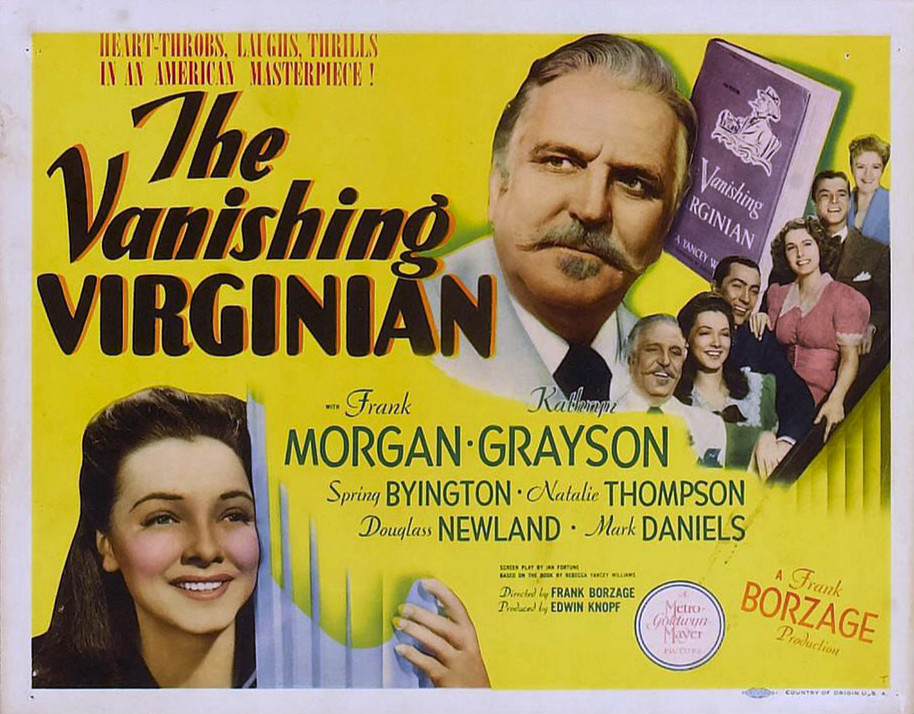
- Directed by: Frank Borzage
- Written by: Jan Fortune
- Based on: The Vanishing Virginian; 1940 novel by Rebecca Yancey Williams
- Produced by: Edwin H. Knopf (as Edwin Knopf); Frank Borzage
- Starring: Frank Morgan; Kathryn Grayson
- Cinematography: Charles Lawton Jr.
- Edited by: James E. Newcom
- Music by: David Snell (score); Earl Brent (adaptation); Lennie Hayton (director); Daniele Amfitheatrof (uncredited)
- Production company: Metro-Goldwyn-Mayer
- Distributed by: Loew's Inc.
- Release date: February 1942
- Running time: 97 minutes
- Country: United States
- Language: English
- Budget: $499,000
- Box office: $905,000

The Vanishing Virginian is a 1942 American drama film directed by Frank Borzage and starring Frank Morgan and Kathryn Grayson. It is based on the memoirs of Rebecca Yancey Williams and set in Lynchburg, Virginia, from 1913 to 1929.

== Synopsis ==
Based on the true story of turn-of-the-century Robert Yancey, lawyer and ever-popular politician in Virginia. The film starts with the statement, "This is the story of a vanishing era when simple men so loved their country, their families and their friends that America became a better place in which to live. Such a man was Cap'n Bob Yancey."

The film is based on a 1940 memoir of the same name by Rebecca Yancey Williams. The book's central figure was her father, Robert Davis Yancey, and detailed the story of Cap'n Bob Yancey, his charming and absent‐minded wife and all the Yancey children. The film explores societal roles in plantations of the "Old Dominion" around Lynchburg and their socio-economic implications, as well as the movement for women’s suffrage, among other things. It is also the town's story, and various eminent Virginians cross the pages, including Carter Glass, General Jubal Early, Lady Astor's father, "Chilly" Langhorne, and others. Katharine Alexander portrays an outspoken woman who moved north and got a divorce; the character is held to be loosely based on Nancy Langhorne Astor.

== Cast ==
- Frank Morgan as Robert Yancey
- Kathryn Grayson as Rebecca Yancey
- Spring Byington as Rosa Yancey
- Natalie Thompson as Margaret Yancey
- Douglass Newland as Jim Shirley (as Douglass Newland)
- Mark Daniels as Jack Holden
- Elizabeth Patterson as Grandma
- Juanita Quigley as Caroline Yancey
- Scotty Beckett as Joel Yancey
- Leigh Whipper as Uncle Josh
- Louise Beavers as Aunt Emmeline
- Katharine Alexander as Marcia Templeton
- J.M. Kerrigan as John Phelps
- Harlan Briggs as Mr. Rogard
- Katharine Alexander as Marcia Marshall

== Box office ==
According to MGM records, the film earned $589,000 in the U.S. and Canada, and $316,000 elsewhere, resulting in a profit of $63,000.

== Trivia ==
A promotional poster for the film makes the claim that "Millions Read the Book", and also refers to the film as an "American Masterpiece" having "Heart-Throbs, Laughs, [and] Thrills". In addition, a 1942 issue of Photoplay referred to the book as "delightful".

The Vanishing Virginian, the book the film is based on, was published a second time in London in 1941, this time under the title Father Was a Handful. This version was published by Michael Joseph, a British writer and publisher who was part of the publishing company that would later become Penguin Random House.

The story told in The Vanishing Virginian is continued in Rebecca Yancey Williams' second and final novel Carry Me Back, which further chronicles the life of the family, focusing on Rebecca Yancey Williams' experiences during the country summers of 1913-14 in Lynchburg. In addition, some of the content in this novel was adapted from Williams' own diary she kept when she was 15 years of age.
