= Moon Over Las Vegas =

1944 film directed by Jean Yarbrough

- Directed by: Jean Yarbrough
- Written by: Clyde Bruckman; George Jeske
- Produced by: Jean Yarbrough
- Starring: Anne Gwynne; David Bruce; Barbara Jo Allen
- Cinematography: Jerome Ash
- Edited by: Milton Carruth
- Production company: Universal Pictures
- Distributed by: Universal Pictures
- Release date: April 1, 1944
- Running time: 65 minutes
- Country: United States
- Language: English

Moon Over Las Vegas is a 1944 American musical comedy film directed by Jean Yarbrough and starring Anne Gwynne, David Bruce and Barbara Jo Allen.

== Plot ==
Beautiful wife Marion Corbett heads for Las Vegas hoping to make her husband Richard jealous. But problems arise when another man catches her fancy, and she gets involved.

== Cast ==
- Anne Gwynne as Marion Corbett
- David Bruce as Richard Corbett
- Barbara Jo Allen as Auntie
- Vivian Austin as Grace Towers
- Alan Dinehart as Hal Blake
- Lee Patrick as Mrs. Blake
- Joe Sawyer as Joe
- Milburn Stone as Jim Bradley
- Gene Austin as Singer Gene Austin
- Doris Sherrell as Singer Doris Sherrell
- Grace Sherrell as Singer Grace Sherrel
- Connie Haines as Singer Connie Haines
- Capella & Patriciaas Dance Team
- Lillian Cornell as Singer
- Anne Triola as Accordion Player
- Jimmie Dodd as Singer
- The Sportsmen Quartet as Singing Group
- Addison Richards as Judge
- Mantan Moreland as Porter
- Eddie Dunn as Conductor
- Tom Dugan as Herman
- Pat West as Taxi Driver
- Muni Seroff as Waiter

== See also ==
- List of films set in Las Vegas

== Bibliography ==
- John Russell Taylor & Arthur Jackson. The Hollywood Musical. McGraw-Hill Book Co., 1971.
