= They All Kissed the Bride =

1942 film by Alexander Hall

- Theatrical release poster
- Directed by: Alexander Hall
- Written by: Andrew P. Solt (adaptation); Henry Altimus (adaptation)
- Screenplay by: P. J. Wolfson
- Story by: Gina Kaus; Andrew P. Solt
- Produced by: Edward Kaufman
- Starring: Joan Crawford; Melvyn Douglas
- Cinematography: Joseph Walker
- Edited by: Viola Lawrence
- Music by: Werner R. Heymann
- Production company: Columbia Pictures
- Distributed by: Columbia Pictures
- Release date: June 11, 1942
- Running time: 87 minutes
- Country: United States
- Language: English
- Box office: $1 million (US rentals)

They All Kissed the Bride is a 1942 American screwball comedy film directed by Alexander Hall and starring Joan Crawford and Melvyn Douglas.

Crawford took over the title role after Carole Lombard died in a plane crash in early 1942. Crawford donated all of her pay for this film to the American Red Cross.

== Plot ==
A trucking firm executive falls in love.

== Cast ==
- Joan Crawford as Margaret "M.J." Drew
- Melvyn Douglas as Michael Holmes
- Roland Young as Marsh
- Billie Burke as Mrs. Drew
- Allen Jenkins as Johnny Johnson
- Andrew Tombes as Crane
- Helen Parrish as Vivian Drew
- Emory Parnell as Mahoney
- Mary Treen as Susie Johnson
- Nydia Westman as Secretary
- Ivan F. Simpson as Dr. Cassell
- Roger Clark as Stephen Pettingill
- Edward Gargan as Private policeman

== Production ==
They All Kissed the Bride was slated to star Carole Lombard in a follow-up film to the successful To Be or Not to Be. However, she died in a 1942 plane crash after departing Las Vegas on her way back from a bond-selling tour. MGM ‘s Louis B. Mayer agreed to place Crawford on loan to Columbia, where producer Edward Kaufman had to rework the script to fit Crawford's style of comedy. In fact, Mayer rarely lent stars of Crawford's stature, not wanting other studios to profit from MGM's star-making machine. Crawford insisted that Melvyn Douglas (with whom she had appeared in 1938's The Shining Hour and 1941's A Woman's Face) star with her.

== Home video ==
As of 2026, They All Kissed the Bride is the only major Joan Crawford sound movie that has not been released on DVD or blu ray in the U.S. However, They All Kissed the Bride was released on VHS on February 11, 1997 as a Columbia Classics title.
