= I Won't Dance =

1935 jazz song

Song
- Published: 1935 by T.B. Harms
- Composer: Jerome Kern
- Lyricists: Oscar Hammerstein II and Otto Harbach; Dorothy Fields and Jimmy McHugh

"I Won't Dance" is a song with music by Jerome Kern that has become a jazz standard. The song had two different sets of lyrics written for it: the first, by Oscar Hammerstein II and Otto Harbach in 1934; and the second, by Dorothy Fields (though Jimmy McHugh was also credited) in 1935. The only surviving lyrics are those by Fields. The original Harbach/Hammerstein lyrics were lost and are unknown to this day.

Kern, Hammerstein and Harbach originally wrote "I Won't Dance" for the 1934 London musical Three Sisters. However, Three Sisters flopped and was quickly forgotten.

The next year, Fields was hired to help with the music for a film version of the 1933 Kern-Harbach musical Roberta. The writing team decided to make use of "I Won't Dance" for the film, also named Roberta. However, Fields rewrote nearly all of the lyrics, making the song more playful and suggestive by having the narrator refuse to dance because "I know that music leads the way to romance". The song became such a hit, largely because it was performed by Fred Astaire, that it is now included in all stage revivals and recordings of Roberta.

== Notable recordings ==
- 1952: Kaye Ballard and Jack Cassidy – Roberta studio cast recording
- 1956: Anita O'Day – Pick Yourself Up with Anita O'Day
- 1956: Carmen Cavallaro – Eddy Duchin Remembered
- 1957: Frank Sinatra – A Swingin' Affair! (and Sinatra-Basie, 1962)
- 1957: Blossom Dearie - Blossom Dearie and Et Tu Bruce; (1984)
- 1960; Margaret Whiting – Margaret Whiting Sings the Jerome Kern Songbook
- 1962; Johnny Mathis - Live It Up!
- 1961: Ella Fitzgerald – Ella Swings Brightly with Nelson
- 1963: Peggy Lee – Mink Jazz
- 1970: Jula de Palma – Jula al Sistina
- 1973: The Pasadena Roof Orchestra – The Best of the Pasadena Roof Orchestra
- 1993: David Silverman Trio (I Have Dreamed CD) Chase Music Group – Los Angeles, CA
- 1994: Sylvia McNair with André Previn and David Finck – Sure Thing: The Jerome Kern Songbook
- 1997: Susannah McCorkle – The People That You Never Get To Love
- 1997: Barbara Cook – Oscar Winners: The Lyrics of Oscar Hammerstein, II
- 1999: Stacey Kent – Let Yourself Go: Celebrating Fred Astaire
- 1999: Busdriver – "I Won't Dance"
- 2002: Will Young – Pop Idol: The Big Band Album
- 2004: Jane Monheit and Michael Bublé – Taking a Chance on Love
- 2007: Richard Rodney Bennett – Words and Music
- 2009: Jessica Lange and Malcolm Gets – their duet recorded in common for the soundtrack Grey Gardens
- 2010: Sarah McKenzie – Don't Tempt Me (2011), We Could Be Lovers (2014).
- 2013: The King's Singers - Great American Songbook
- 2014: Lady Gaga and Tony Bennett – Cheek to Cheek
- 2015: Jamie Parker with John Wilson Orchestra - Celebrating Frank Sinatra (DVD)
- 2021: Willie Nelson and Diana Krall - That's Life

== In film and television ==
The song was added to the 1935 film version of "Roberta", sung by Fred Astaire and Ginger Rogers. It is danced to (solo) by Astaire, then reprised as a dance by both.

The song is anachronistically used as a musical number performed by Felicia Day in the television film biography of President Franklin D. Roosevelt, Warm Springs, which largely takes place in the year 1924.

The song was also performed by Lucille Bremer and Van Johnson for the 1946 Kern biopic Till the Clouds Roll By. Since the scene takes place in a 1920s nightclub, its appearance in the chronology of the film is, again, anachronistic.

The song was sung and danced to by Marge Champion and Gower Champion in the 1952 film "Lovely to Look At".

The version of the song by Frank Sinatra was in a scene in the film What Women Want, where the character Nick, played by Mel Gibson, is dancing with a coat hanger.

The song was performed on The Muppet Show Episode 34 in a scene where Miss Piggy asks Kermit the Frog to dance.

The song was performed in the 2000 film Love's Labour's Lost.

The song was performed as a duet by Jessica Lange and Malcolm Gets playing the roles of "Big Edie" Edith Bouvier Beale and George Gould Strong in HBO's 2009 dramatization Grey Gardens based on the 1975 documentary Grey Gardens.
