= Roberta (musical) =

1933 musical by Jerome Kern and Otto Harbach

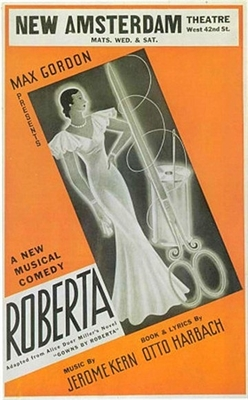
- Music: Jerome Kern
- Lyrics: Otto Harbach
- Book: Otto Harbach
- Basis: Gowns by Roberta, a novel by Alice Duer Miller
- Productions: 1933 Broadway; 1935 Film version 1969 Television version

Roberta is a musical from 1933 with music by Jerome Kern, and lyrics and book by Otto Harbach. The playful romantic comedy is based on the novel Gowns by Roberta by Alice Duer Miller. It features the songs "Yesterdays", "Smoke Gets in Your Eyes", "Let's Begin", "You're Devastating", "Something Had To Happen", "The Touch of Your Hand" and "I'll Be Hard to Handle".

== Productions ==
The original Broadway production opened at the New Amsterdam Theatre on November 18, 1933, and ran for 295 performances closing on 21 July 1934. It starred Tamara Drasin (billed as Tamara), Bob Hope, George Murphy, Lyda Roberti, Fred MacMurray, Fay Templeton, Ray Middleton (billed as Raymond E. Middleton), Allan Jones, and Sydney Greenstreet. Hope, Murphy, MacMurray and Greenstreet were not yet the Hollywood stars they would soon be, and Middleton was not the Broadway leading man he would become after Annie Get Your Gun.

An Australian production opened at His Majesty's Theatre in Melbourne on December 22, 1934. The cast featured Madge Elliot and Cyril Ritchard.

== Original Broadway cast ==
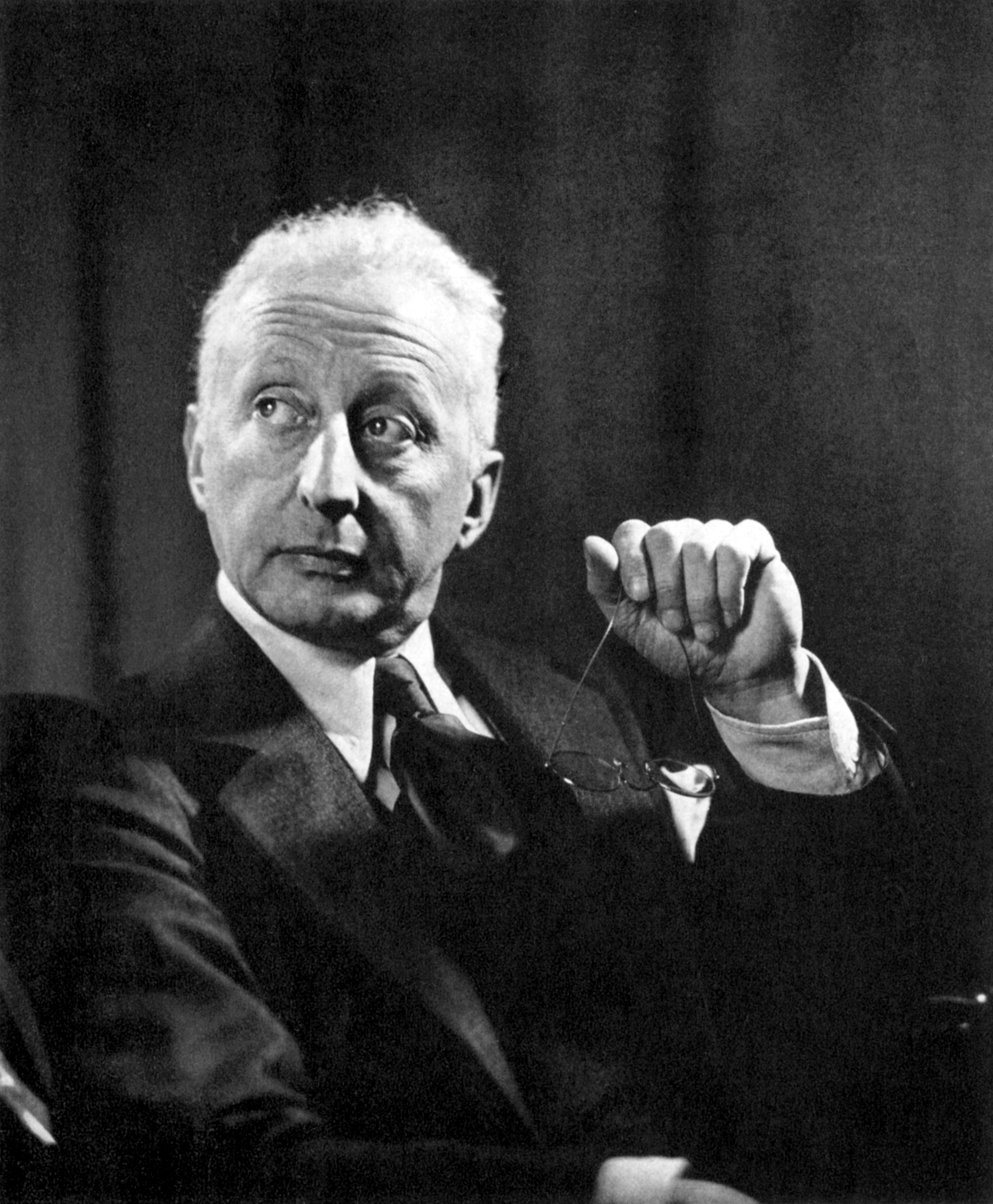
Jerome Kern in 1933

- Bob Hope as Huckleberry Haines, owner of a fashion house in Paris from America
- Tamara Drasin as Russian Princess Stephanie
- Ray Middleton as John Kent
- Fay Templeton as Aunt Minnie, also known as Roberta
- George Murphy as Billy Boyden
- Lyda Roberti as Madame Nunez / Clementina Scharwenka
- Sydney Greenstreet as Lord Henry Delves
- Fred MacMurray as California Collegian
- Allan Jones as California Collegian
- Helen Gray as Sophie Teale
- Jane Evans as Mrs. Teale
- Bobette Christine as Angele
- William Hain as Ladislaw
- Nayan Pearce as Luella Laverne
- Mavis Walsh as Marie
- Ed Jerome as Monsieur Leroux
- Berenice Alaire as Sidonie
- Gretchen Sherman as The Buyer
- Virginia Whitmore as The Flower Girl

== Other versions ==
The play was made into a 1935 film by RKO starring Irene Dunne, Fred Astaire, Ginger Rogers, and Randolph Scott. The film omitted "The Touch of Your Hand" (sung by a minor character), "Something Had To Happen", and "You're Devastating" (originally Middleton's big song in the show), but added the Kern songs "I Won't Dance" (lifted from the flop Kern show Three Sisters) and "Lovely to Look At" (written for the 1935 film and nominated for an Academy Award). These two additions became so popular that they are now frequently included in revivals and recordings of Roberta.

A radio adaptation of Roberta was presented on Philip Morris Playhouse on CBS May 14, 1943. Mary Martin and William Gargan starred in the program.

In 1952, MGM remade Roberta under the title Lovely to Look At. This remake also included the two songs added to the 1935 film. It starred Kathryn Grayson, Howard Keel, Red Skelton, Ann Miller, Gower Champion, Marge Champion, and Zsa Zsa Gabor, was made in Technicolor and reuniting four members of the previous year's Show Boat (Grayson, Keel and the two Champions).

In 1958, it was made into a made-for-TV-movie starring Bob Hope, Anna Maria Alberghetti, Howard Keel and Janis Paige.

The show was also presented on television in a highly adapted, modernized 1969 NBC color telecast. This production was presented by Bob Hope, who reprised his original stage role, inserting many new, then-topical jokes about current events. Others in the cast included Michele Lee, John Davidson, Eve McVeagh, and Janis Paige (who sang "I Won't Dance" with a male chorus).

In 2014, New World Records released a complete recording of the score, reconstructed by Larry Moore, with Rob Berman conducting the Orchestra of Ireland and a cast of American, British, and Irish performers, including Jason Graae, Annalene Beechey, Kim Criswell, Patrick Cummings, Tally Sessions, Diana Montague, Laura Daniel, Jeanne Lehman, John Molloy, and Eamonn Mulhall.
