= I'll Be Hard to Handle =

"I'll Be Hard to Handle" is a 1932 song composed by Jerome Kern, with lyrics written by Bernard Dougall.

It was written for the musical Roberta, where it was introduced by Lyda Roberti. Roberta opened on Broadway in November 1933.

In the 1935 film version of Roberta, the song was sung by Ginger Rogers, who did an imitation of Roberti.

In the 1952 Technicolor version, Lovely to Look At, directed by Mervyn LeRoy, it was sung and danced by Ann Miller.

== Notable recordings ==
- Ella Fitzgerald - Ella Fitzgerald Sings the Jerome Kern Songbook (1963)
- Rogers and Astaire
