= 1937 Academy Awards =

1937 Academy Awards may refer to:

- 9th Academy Awards, the Academy Awards ceremony that took place in 1937
- 10th Academy Awards, the 1938 ceremony honoring the best in film for 1937
