= Lullaby of Broadway (film) =

1951 film by David Butler

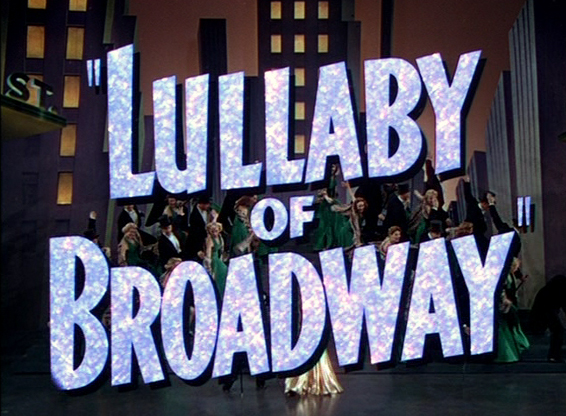
- Title card from the trailer
- Directed by: David Butler
- Written by: Earl Baldwin (inspired by the song "Lullaby of Broadway")
- Produced by: William Jacobs
- Starring: Doris Day; Gene Nelson; S.Z. Sakall; Billy De Wolfe; Gladys George; Florence Bates; Anne Triola
- Cinematography: Wilfred M. Cline
- Edited by: Irene Morra
- Music by: Howard Jackson (uncredited)
- Distributed by: Warner Bros. Pictures
- Release date: March 26, 1951 (New York)
- Running time: 92 minutes
- Country: United States
- Language: English
- Budget: $1,105,000
- Box office: $3,085,000 $2,225,000 (U.S. rentals)

Lullaby of Broadway is a 1951 American musical romantic comedy film released by Warner Bros. Pictures, directed by David Butler and starring Doris Day, Gene Nelson, Gladys George, S.Z. Sakall, Billy De Wolfe, Florence Bates, and Anne Triola.

Songs from the film were released on an album of the same name.

== Plot ==
Melinda Howard is an entertainer traveling by ocean liner from England to surprise mother, Broadway singer Jessica Howard, in New York City. Melinda believes that her mother lives in a mansion, but Jessica's alcoholism has reduced her to singing in a Greenwich Village saloon, and the mansion actually belongs to Adolph Hubbell and his wife.

Jessica's friends, the Hubbells' butler Lefty Mack and his fiancée Gloria Davis, the maid, are an unsuccessful vaudeville team who have been forwarding her letters to Melinda. Lefty pretends that Jessica has rented the house to the Hubbells while she is on tour, and, when Melinda discloses that she has no money, offers her one of the servants' rooms for the night. Lefty promises Melinda that her mother will return home soon and informs Jessica of her daughter's arrival. He suggests that she come to the house the next night when the Hubbells will be hosting a party attended by many Broadway performers.

Adolph has discovered Melinda's presence, and, after Lefty explains the situation, Adolph agrees to keep Jessica's secret. At the party, Melinda awaits her mother's arrival and spots Tom Farnham, who was on the boat with Melinda and had made a pass at her. He had also kept his profession a secret while on the ship. He entertains the crowd with song and dance, as he is the male lead in George Ferndel's newest production, Lullaby of Broadway. Ferndel tries to persuade Adolph to invest in his latest show, but Adolph refuses unless he is permitted to help cast the production. Jessica fails to appear at the party because she has been hospitalized with delirium tremens, and Lefty explains to Melinda that Jessica's show was too popular for her to leave. Melinda vows to wait for her.

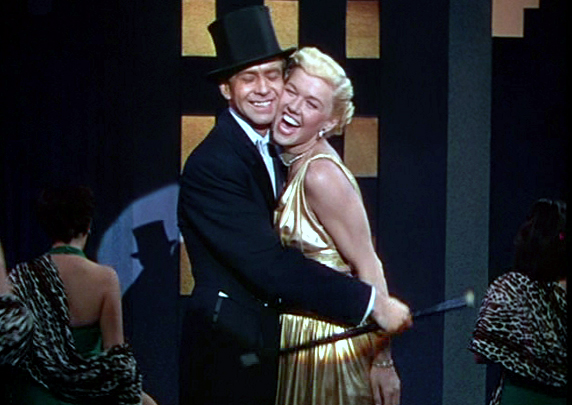
Gene Nelson as Tom Farnham and Doris Day as Melinda Howard

To raise Melinda's spirits, Lefty suggests that Adolph take her to dinner and present her to Ferndel as the potential new star of his show. Ferndel is impressed by Melinda's performance, and as a reward, Adolph wishes buy Melinda a fur coat. Tom sees him in the fur shop and Adolph begs him to keep it a secret. The fur arrives at the house and Gloria is horrified, as she misinterprets Adolph's intentions. Melinda, upset by the insinuations, insists on returning the coat and informs Lefty and Gloria that they will both have parts in the musical.

Before the coat is returned, Mrs. Hubbell finds it and believes that it is a surprise for her. She wears it that night to a charity ball where Melinda sees her and remarks to Tom that the coat had originally been meant for her. Tom misinterprets her statements, and they quarrel bitterly. Although Jessica has been released from the hospital, she fears Melinda's reaction to her present state and refuses to meet her.

Just before the show opens, Mrs. Hubbell learns the truth about the fur and names Melinda in a divorce suit against Adolph. Tom offers to forgive Melinda, and she realizes that he thought that she was romantically involved with Adolph. Shortly afterward, an aggressive reporter recognizes Jessica's picture and tells Melinda the truth about her mother. Shattered, Melinda resolves to return to England and begs Lefty to purchase her ticket. Gloria and Lefty meet Melinda at the ship and escort her to a stateroom where Jessica is waiting. They are tearfully reunited, and Lefty informs them that Mrs. Hubbell now knows that there was nothing between Melinda and Adolph. They all leave together for the theater, where opening night is a success, and Tom and Melinda are free to pursue their romance.

== Cast ==
- Doris Day as Melinda Howard
- Gene Nelson as Tom Farnham
- S. Z. Sakall as Mr. Adolph Hubbell
- Billy De Wolfe as Lefty Mack
- Gladys George as Jessica Howard
- Florence Bates as Mrs. Anna Hubbell
- Anne Triola as Gloria Davis

== Music ==
- "Lullaby of Broadway", sung by Doris Day, music and lyrics by Harry Warren and Al Dubin
- "You're Getting to Be a Habit with Me", sung by Doris Day, music and lyrics by Harry Warren and Al Dubin
- "Just One of Those Things", sung by Doris Day, music and lyrics by Cole Porter
- "Somebody Loves Me", sung by Doris Day and Gene Nelson (dubbed by Hal Derwin), music by George Gershwin, lyrics by B. G. DeSylva and Ballard MacDonald
- "I Love the Way You Say Goodnight", sung by Doris Day and Gene Nelson (dubbed by Hal Derwin), music and lyrics by Eddie Pola and George Wyle
- "Please Don't Talk About Me When I'm Gone", sung by Gladys George, music and lyrics by Sam H. Stept, Sidney Clare and Bee Palmer
- "In a Shanty in Old Shanty Town", sung by Gladys George, music and lyrics by Jack Little, John Siras and Joe Young
- "Zing! Went the Strings of My Heart", sung by Gene Nelson (dubbed by Hal Derwin), music and lyrics by James F. Hanley
- "You're Dependable", sung by Billy De Wolfe and Anne Triola, music and lyrics by Sy Miller and Jerry Seelen
- "We'd Like to Go on a Trip", sung by Billy De Wolfe and Anne Triola, music and lyrics by Sy Miller and Jerry Seelen

== Reception ==
In a contemporary review for The New York Times, critic A. H. Weiler wrote: "Since Doris Day and Gene Nelson, as well as George Z. Sakall and Billy De Wolfe, are members in good standing of Warner Brothers' varsity, it is not surprising that they are turning up again in a Technicolored musical from that manufactory. But the team isn't getting much help from the coaches in 'Lullaby of Broadway,' the latest song-and-dance fest ... They are pitching in with a will and are tripping lightly over some solid numbers of the past and just tripping over this latter-day yarn, which does little but telegraph its punches and fill in time between the buck-and-wing sessions."

According to Warner Bros. records, the film was budgeted at $1,105,000 and earned $2,102,000 domestically and $983,000 foreign.
