= Anne Triola =

American actress (1920–2012)

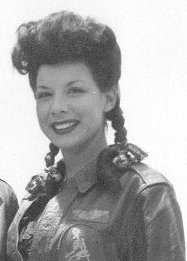
- Born: September 25, 1920; Los Angeles, California, U.S.
- Died: July 2, 2012 (aged 91); Lee's Summit, Missouri, U.S.
- Occupations: Actress, singer, accordionist
- Years active: 1932–1960
- Spouse(s): Ralph J. Quartaroli (m. 1953–1960; his death); Willey G. Forman (m. 1979–1983; divorced)

Anne Margaret Triola (September 25, 1920 – July 27, 2012) was an American singer, musician, and actress of stage, film, and television. As a comedian and supporting actress, she got her start singing in Hollywood night clubs. Triola made her mark in the well known musical film Lullaby Of Broadway (1951) and received much praise for her effort in the motion picture Without Reservations (1946), which starred Claudette Colbert and John Wayne. She participated in five Hollywood films, assisted with USO tours in the Pacific Theater during World War II, and caused audiences to lose themselves in laughter, but Triola may best be remembered for work as a singer and comedian with the musical theatre that included performances in night clubs all over the country such as the Blue Angel in New York City.

Triola was listed as being one of the most popular performers in the history of Music Circus that included her work with the Sacramento Music Circus in the 1950s. She was described as a petite, dark haired, dark-eyed song stylist with the Betty Hutton type of delivery.

== Early life ==
Triola was born in Los Angeles, California and was of Italian descent. Her childhood was not typical for a little girl growing up in Southern California. Instead, Triola embarked on a long stint of study that began with piano when she was just three years old, prematurely launching her professional career when most children were, back then, mastering the art of roller skating. She learned to play the accordion, and by the early age of 12 Triola began playing the squeezebox and singing in various cafes, including one called "Burp Hollow."

== World War II ==
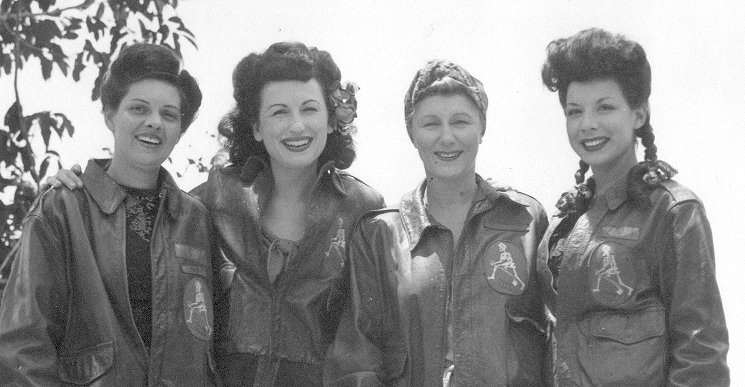
At Hollandia, Dutch New Guinea, 1944 Left to right: Helen McClure, Shirley Cornell, Judith Anderson, Anne Triola

The beginning of Triola's career in show business was interrupted by World War II as Hollywood became involved with the war effort through its USO tours that included big-name actors Bob Hope and Gary Cooper. From the Hollywood "Bar of Music" she went on a South Pacific tour with Judith Anderson's USO troupe. They served in a number of USO shows during the war and entertained at such well-remembered spots in New Guinea as Lae, Nadzab and Finchhaven in spite of all the dangers that existed from air raids by Japanese bombers and strafing Zeros that were land-based or planes coming from aircraft carriers Shokaku and Zuikaku.

It was recorded on a specific day in the summer of 1944 at Hollandia, Dutch New Guinea, that Triola, Anderson, and their USO troupe entertained as many as 1,500 American servicemen—Navy, Army, and Merchant Marine personnel—at the 113th Amphitheater. Triola played her accordion while Shirley Cornell played the violin. Noted actress Anderson and Helen McClure each performed singing duties while PFC Paul Parmalee played the piano as the group worked together to lift the spirits of battle-weary, worn-out soldiers.

Triola lost one $1,500 accordion at the Pacific when a light globe set fire to it.

== Career ==
=== Started as accordionist ===
The career of Anne Triola was marked by circumstances, and her success as a singing comedian was the result of one of these. Originally Triola was an accordionist and as such accompanied Judith Anderson's USO troupe into the Pacific Theater during World War II. She was well known as a night club performer only. In New Guinea her accordion burned and it became necessary for Triola to reschedule her act. "Then," she said, "I just started singing a little bit to help out." She found she had success with comedy selections. "My friends used to tell me I had a flair for comedy with the accordion, but I never specialized in it until I started singing," she said.

=== Becomes singer ===
When she returned from USO tours she set out to "develop a style of my own" and once more started a nightclub circuit act, this time as a singer.

Possibly her greatest fortune occurred while singing in the Blue Angel in New York City. There she became acquainted with some of the top New York theatrical persons. Rodgers and Hammerstein asked her to star in the London production of Annie Get Your Gun. Her nightclub commitments prevented her from taking the offer but several years later Oscar Hammerstein recommended her for the same role in the Sacramento Music Circus.

While she was singing at Slapsy Maxie's, Director Mervyn LeRoy and Producer Jesse L. Lasky signed her for films at RKO where she made three movies, one with John Wayne. It was reported that Triola was in the floor show at Slapsy Maxie Rosenbloom's when Lasky and LeRoy found her and immediately offered her a contract. From those movies, Without Reservations stood out where she had a feature role. Journalist Gene Handsaker singled out Triola for this reason in a June 5, 1946, edition of the Prescott Evening Courier as he explained, "Some supporting performances are terrific, especially that of Anne Triola, who amid shrieks of preview laughter swiped her scenes clear away from Stars Colbert and John Wayne."

She was loaned to Warner Brothers for the comic supporting role opposite Billy De Wolfe in Lullaby Of Broadway (1951). Then the motion picture industry deflated, leaving contracts mostly worthless.

Lullaby Of Broadway would be her last movie which was filmed in Technicolor. Triola and De Wolfe sang a couple of duets, "You're Dependable" and "We'd Like to Go on a Trip." Box-office star Doris Day and actor Gene Nelson received most of the attention in the Technicolor musical extravaganza, but the comedy aspect of the film was well provided with the performances of De Wolfe and his vaudeville partner, Triola.

=== Started in television ===
Once more Anne Triola returned to night clubs and started in the new entertainment medium, television. She appeared on panel programs and as guest artist on shows. Her last television program was as a guest of Frank Sinatra.

Soon afterward, Triola's career would come to a halt as she would soon marry in 1953, move to nearby Modesto and become a housewife. "After the hustle and bustle of show business," she said, "it is nice to settle down for a change where it is quiet."

=== Music Circus ===
Triola's connection with the Music Circus eventually brought her out of retirement from show business. She had been a part of the Sacramento Music Circus when it first started in 1951 which was vaudeville stage entertainment being held inside a big blue and green tent. Triola starred in this operation during its first two seasons before marrying Ralph J. Quartaroli in 1953. In July 1954, she broke out of retirement and began rehearsing for leading roles in the same Sacramento Music Circus. She assisted such musicals as New Faces, Oklahoma!, and Brigadoon. She played the role of Meg in Brigadoon and sang Eartha Kitt's numbers in New Faces.

With Triola's popularity growing, producers Howard Young and Russell Lewis gave a fitting tribute to Music Circus' favorite actress as they opened the fifth anniversary season in May 1955. She starred in the musical Annie Get Your Gun which was her signature gig that Triola had performed during the Music Circus' first season.

In August 1959, she took on the lead role of Bells Are Ringing at the Sacramento Music Circus. Co-starring with her were Gar Moore and Marvin Kaplan. She performed the role of a telephone answering service operator in this romantic musical comedy which ran for two weeks straight that summer.

== Personal life ==
In 1953, Triola married successful businessman Ralph J. Quartaroli, president of Stanislaus Food Products Company, and decided to break away from show business as the couple moved to Modesto, California, where his family owned a cannery. She had met him in Los Angeles when she was there on a business trip. She decided "from experience in show business" marriages and careers may mix but not well. So Triola abandoned her career and became a housewife. "It is hard work, the kind of work a person does for the love of it and not money," she added.

A few years later on November 16, 1956, Triola gave birth to a 6-pound, 13-ounce baby girl, whom they named Tina. This gave them two daughters in all as Quartaroli had a daughter named Susan from his previous marriage to his first wife, Edna B. Quartaroli.

Tragedy struck the family when Triola's husband and three passengers on board his private airplane were killed in a plane crash during a trip from Las Vegas to Van Nuys, California, on May 15, 1960.

Triola remarried in 1979, to Willey G. Forman (b. 1912) but they divorced in 1983. He died in June 1999 at the age of 86.

She lived in Albuquerque, New Mexico in the early 1990s but had moved back to Los Angeles by 1996. Triola died in Lee's Summit, Missouri on July 27, 2012, at the age of 91.

== Filmography ==
- Snow Follies (1939)
- Moon Over Las Vegas (1944)
- Without Reservations (1946)
- Sleep, My Love (1948)
- Lullaby of Broadway (1951)
