= Kathryn Grayson =

American actress (1922–2010)

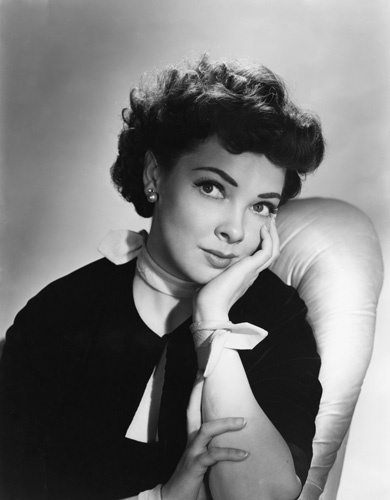
- Grayson in 1943
- Born: Zelma Kathryn Elisabeth Hedrick; February 9, 1922; Winston-Salem, North Carolina, U.S.
- Died: February 17, 2010 (aged 88); Los Angeles, California, U.S.
- Occupations: Actress; singer
- Years active: 1941–1998
- Spouses: John Shelton (m. 1941; div. 1946) Johnnie Johnston (m. 1947; div. 1951)
- Children: 1
- Relatives: Frances Raeburn (sister); Kristin Towers-Rowles (granddaughter)
- Website: kathryngrayson.com

Kathryn Grayson (born Zelma Kathryn Elisabeth Hedrick; 9 February 1922 – 17 February 2010) was an American actress and coloratura soprano.

From the age of 12, Grayson trained as an opera singer. By the early 1940s, she was under contract to Metro-Goldwyn-Mayer, soon establishing a career principally through her work in musicals.

After several supporting roles, she was a lead performer in such films as Thousands Cheer (1943), Anchors Aweigh (1945) with Frank Sinatra and Gene Kelly, and Show Boat (1951) and Kiss Me Kate (1953), both with Howard Keel.

Grayson also worked in theatre, appearing in Camelot (1962–1964). Later in the decade, she performed in several operas, including La bohème, Madama Butterfly, Orpheus in the Underworld, and La traviata.

== Early life ==
Zelma Kathryn Elisabeth Hedrick was born on February 9, 1922, in Winston-Salem, North Carolina, one of four children of Charles Hedrick, a building contractor-realtor, and Lillian Hedrick (née Grayson).

The Hedrick family later moved to Kirkwood, Missouri, outside St. Louis. At the age of 12, Grayson was discovered singing on the empty stage of the St. Louis Municipal Opera House by a janitor, who introduced her to Frances Marshall of the Chicago Civic Opera, from whom Grayson received voice lessons. Grayson's sister Frances Raeburn (born Mildred Hedrick; 1924–1976) was also an actress and singer, appearing along with her in the film Seven Sweethearts. Grayson had two brothers, Clarence "Bud" E. Hedrick, and Harold. The family moved to California when she was 15 years old.

== Film career ==
=== 1940s ===
In 1940, an MGM talent scout saw Grayson performing at a music festival. MGM hoped to find a replacement for Deanna Durbin, who had left the studio for Universal Pictures. For the next 18 months, Grayson took voice, drama and diction lessons and followed a routine of dieting and exercise. Within a year, she had her first screen test. However, studio executives were not satisfied, and she endured a further six months of lessons until she made her first film appearance in 1941's Andy Hardy's Private Secretary as secretary Kathryn Land, participating in three musical numbers.

Two further films were planned for Grayson in 1941: White House Girl, which was later produced in 1948 with Durbin, and Very Warm for May, from the Jerome Kern and Oscar Hammerstein musical of the same name. The film eventually was produced in 1944 as Broadway Rhythm.

Grayson appeared in three films in 1942: The Vanishing Virginian, Rio Rita and Seven Sweethearts. In the first, Grayson plays the teenage daughter, Rebecca, of the eccentric Yancey family from Lynchburg, Virginia. Set in 1913, the film was based on Rebecca Yancey Williams's own family.

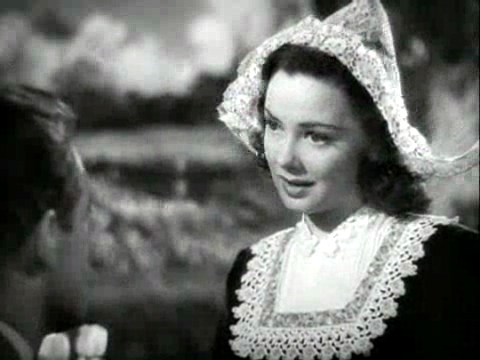
Grayson as Billie Van Maaster in Seven Sweethearts.

Grayson co-starred in Rio Rita with Abbott and Costello. Grayson portrayed the title character, Rita Winslow. The film was originally meant to be an adaptation of the 1927 Broadway musical; however, only two songs were retained for the film, the title song, and "The Ranger Song", which was performed by Grayson.

Co-starring Van Heflin, Seven Sweethearts cast Grayson as the youngest of seven daughters from Holland, Michigan, who is hired by reporter-photographer Heflin to serve as a model and secretary while he covers the town's tulip festival, and with whom he falls in love.

In 1943, Grayson appeared in the film Thousands Cheer, (originally titled Private Miss Jones), along with Gene Kelly, Mickey Rooney, Eleanor Powell, June Allyson and others. The film was intended as a morale booster for American troops and their families. Grayson starred as the singing daughter of an Army commander.

It was announced in 1942 that Grayson would appear in An American Symphony with Judy Garland. Garland was replaced by June Allyson, and the film was retitled as "Two Sisters from Boston" and released in 1946.

Grayson did not appear in any films for nearly two years (from 1943 to 1945), but instead worked at entertaining troops during the war and performing on radio programs. Notably, it is reported that she would only perform under the condition that the audience was integrated, as troops were segregated at the time.

She returned to films in Anchors Aweigh, a musical romantic-comedy set in Los Angeles and co-starring Kelly and Frank Sinatra. Anchors Aweigh was the fifth-highest grossing film of 1945, earning over $4.779 million.

This was followed by Two Sisters from Boston and guest appearances in Ziegfeld Follies and Till the Clouds Roll By. Her performance in Till the Clouds Roll By included "Make Believe" in a capsule version of the musical Show Boat, which would be remade five years later, with Grayson in the starring role.

MGM re-paired Grayson and Sinatra for two movies in 1947 and 1948, It Happened in Brooklyn and The Kissing Bandit. Both films performed poorly at the box office, and audiences thought the plots absurd. After the setbacks of Brooklyn and Bandit, Grayson was partnered with tenor Mario Lanza in That Midnight Kiss in 1949.

=== 1950s ===
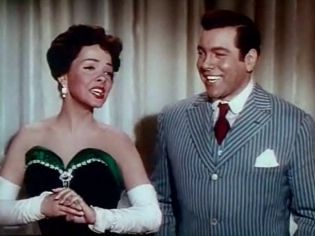
with Mario Lanza in The Toast of New Orleans

In 1950, Grayson was once again partnered with Lanza, and portrayed an opera singer in The Toast of New Orleans, and performed the Academy-Award-nominated song "Be My Love". While shooting the Madama Butterfly scene in the film, Lanza kept attempting to french kiss Grayson, which Grayson claimed was made even worse by the fact that Lanza would constantly eat garlic before shooting. Grayson went to costume designer Helen Rose, who sewed pieces of brass into Grayson's gloves. Any time Lanza attempted to french kiss her after that, she hit him with the brass-filled glove.

For the premiere of the film in New Orleans, she was a guest at an auction selling the film's costumes.

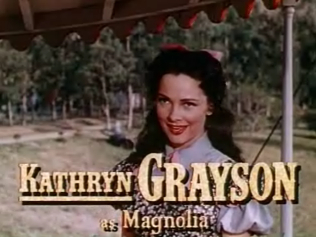
Grayson as Magnolia Hawkes.

Grayson replaced June Allyson in the role of Ina Massine in 1951's Grounds for Marriage. She portrayed an opera singer with laryngitis, alongside Van Johnson who played her doctor and love interest. This was also her first non-singing role at MGM. Grayson's musical performances do appear in the film, but in the form of recordings.

Grayson was next cast as Magnolia Hawks in the 1951 remake of the 1927 Hammerstein and Kern musical, Show Boat. Show Boat was the third-highest-grossing film of 1951, earning over $5.533 million.

Grayson teamed again with Keel in the 1952 Technicolor musical Lovely to Look At, a remake of the 1935 Astaire and Rogers film Roberta.

She was released to the Warner Brothers studio in January 1953, with the stipulation that she return to MGM for one more film. She returned to co-star for a third time with Howard Keel in her most acclaimed role, as Lilli Vanessi/Katharina in Kiss Me Kate, released in November 1953. The film was lavishly produced (the only musical other than Those Redheads from Seattle (1953) to be filmed in 3-D), with songs by Cole Porter, choreography by Hermes Pan, and musical direction by André Previn.

=== Warner Bros ===
While on loan to Warner Bros, her first musical release was The Desert Song, May 1953, alongside Gordon MacRae. She was asked to perform La Bohème at the Central City Opera House in Central City, Colorado, but due to her filming obligations for The Desert Song, she had to turn it down. Warner Bros. starred her in a second musical that year, So This Is Love.

== Television ==
Grayson appeared on television occasionally, having guest starred in the CBS anthology series, General Electric Theater in the episode, Shadow on the Heart, with John Ericson, and on Playhouse 90 in the title role of the "Lone Woman", with Raymond Burr and Scott Brady in the historical roles of the brothers Charles and William Bent, respectively. She was the mystery guest on What's My Line on July 20, 1958, at a time when she was performing at the Latin Quarter nightclub, and she did not stump the panelists. In the 1980s, Grayson guest starred in three episodes as recurring character Ideal Molloy on Murder, She Wrote.

== Stage career ==
Grayson appeared on stage in numerous productions including Show Boat, Rosalinda, Kiss Me, Kate, Naughty Marietta, and The Merry Widow, for which she was nominated for Chicago's Sarah Siddons Award. In 1953, Grayson optioned the story It's Greek to Me, written by Helen Deutsch, to be accompanied by a score from Cole Porter. The story was a mythical love story about Hercules and Hippolyte, and Grayson hoped to be reunited with Howard Keel and take the show on the road. However, the project fell apart.

Her casting in The Merry Widow led to her replacing Julie Andrews in 1962 as Queen Guinevere in Camelot. She then continued the role for over sixteen months in the national tour of the United States before leaving for health reasons.

Grayson had a lifelong dream of being an opera star, and she appeared in a number of operas in the 1960s, such as La bohème, Madama Butterfly, Orpheus in the Underworld and La traviata. Her dramatic and comedy stage roles included Night Watch, Noises Off, Love Letters and Something's Afoot as Dottie Otterling.

== Musical career ==
Grayson trained from the age of twelve as an opera singer. While appearing in her film roles, Grayson also performed on the radio. Grayson performed on concert tours throughout the 1950s. In May 1951, Grayson had to postpone a concert tour due to being unknowingly cast in Lovely to Look At. "My concert bookings were all set. So when I read in New York that I was to do this film, I said 'How silly!', then boom! The next day I got my studio telegram asking me to return for the picture!"

In 1952, Grayson was offered more than $10,000 to perform for a week at the Riviera night club in New Jersey before making The Desert Song. After filming The Desert Song, Grayson created a recording of the musical with Tony Martin.

Grayson gave nightclub and concert tours in Australia a few times. On one of those trips to the Far East, Grayson also gave a concert in Manila, the Philippines, in 1969, where she performed at the New Frontier theater.

Grayson supervised the Voice and Choral Studies Program at Idaho State University.

== Personal life ==
Grayson married twice, first to actor John Shelton and then to the actor/singer Johnnie Johnston. She was a Republican.

=== John Shelton ===
Shelton and Grayson eloped to Las Vegas, where they were married on July 11, 1941. The two had courted for 18 months, after meeting while making screen tests. In July 1942, Shelton moved out of their Brentwood home and into his own apartment. This came after a month of reconciliation after a judge dismissed their divorce suit. Grayson charged Shelton with mental cruelty. They divorced on June 17, 1946.

=== Johnnie Johnston ===
Grayson wed singer/actor Johnnie Johnston on August 22, 1947, in Carmel, California.

Grayson and Johnston separated on November 15, 1950. On October 3, 1951, Grayson was granted a divorce from Johnston on the grounds of mental cruelty. Johnston's This Time for Keeps co-star, Esther Williams, claimed in her 1999 autobiography that while making the film, Johnston would read Grayson's intimate letters aloud to the girls in his fan club, including the "all-too-graphic details about what she liked about love-making."

=== Death ===
Grayson died of natural causes, in her sleep at her home in Los Angeles on February 17, 2010, at the age of 88.

== Filmography ==
Year	Film	Role
1941	Andy Hardy's Private Secretary	Kathryn Land
1942	The Vanishing Virginian	Rebecca Yancey
1942	Rio Rita	Rita Winslow
1942	Seven Sweethearts	Billie Van Maaster
1943	Thousands Cheer	Kathryn Jones
1945	Anchors Aweigh	Susan Abbott
1946	Ziegfeld Follies	Herself
1946	Two Sisters from Boston	Abigail Chandler
1946	Till the Clouds Roll By	Magnolia in 'Show Boat'
1947	It Happened in Brooklyn	Anne Fielding
1948	The Kissing Bandit	Teresa
1949	That Midnight Kiss	Prudence Budell
1949	Some of the Best	Herself
1950	The Toast of New Orleans	Suzette Micheline
1951	Grounds for Marriage	Ina Massine
1951	Show Boat	Magnolia Hawks
1952	Lovely to Look At	Stephanie
1953	The Desert Song	Margot Birabeau
1953	So This Is Love	Grace Moore
1953	Kiss Me Kate	Lilli Vanessi / Kate
1956	The Vagabond King	Catherine de Vaucelles
1976	The Amazing World of Psychic Phenomena	Psychic Detective
1994	A Century of Cinema	Herself
2003	Cole Porter in Hollywood: Too Darn Hot	Herself-Kate/Lilli in Kiss Me Kate
2004	The Masters Behind the Musicals	Herself

== Stage work ==
- Madama Butterfly (1959)
- La traviata (1960)
- La bohème (1960)
- The Merry Widow (1961)
- Naughty Marietta (1961)
- Rosalinda (1962)
- Camelot (1962)
- Show Boat (1964)
- Night Watch (1982)
- Orpheus in the Underworld (1983)
- Something's Afoot (1983)
- Noises Off (1987)
- Love Letters (1996)
- Red Sox and Roses (1997)
