= Roberta (1935 film) =

1935 American film by William A. Seiter

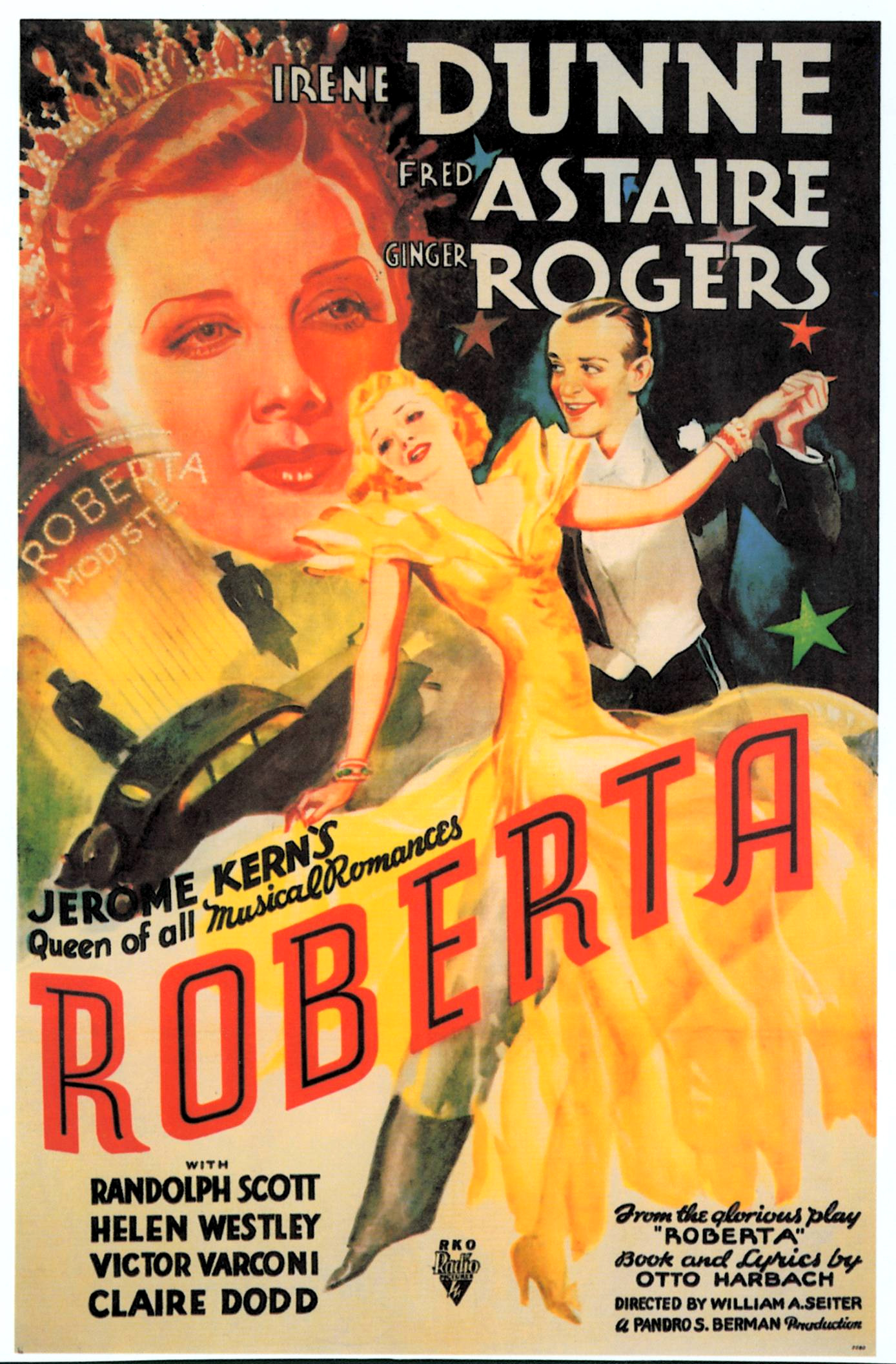
- Theatrical release poster
- Directed by: William A. Seiter
- Screenplay by: Jane Murfin; Sam Mintz; Allan Scott; Glenn Tryon (add'l dialogue); Dorothy Yost (contr. to treatment)
- Based on: Roberta 1933 stage musical by Jerome Kern Otto Harbach; Gowns by Roberta 1933 novel by Alice Duer Miller
- Produced by: Pandro S. Berman
- Starring: Irene Dunne; Fred Astaire; Ginger Rogers
- Cinematography: Edward Cronjager
- Edited by: William Hamilton
- Music by: Jerome Kern, conducted by Max Steiner
- Production company: RKO Radio Pictures
- Distributed by: RKO Radio Pictures
- Release date: March 8, 1935
- Running time: 105 or 106.5 minutes
- Country: United States
- Language: English
- Budget: $610,000 (Cost: ~$750,000)
- Box office: $2,335,000

Roberta is a 1935 American musical film released by RKO Radio Pictures and directed by William A. Seiter. It stars Irene Dunne, Fred Astaire, Ginger Rogers, and features Randolph Scott, Helen Westley, Victor Varconi and Claire Dodd. The film was an adaptation of the 1933 Broadway musical Roberta, which in turn was based on the novel Gowns by Roberta by Alice Duer Miller. It was a solid hit, showing a net profit of more than three-quarters of a million dollars.

The film kept the famous songs "Yesterdays", "Let's Begin" (with altered lyrics), and "Smoke Gets in Your Eyes" from the play, along with a fourth song, "I'll Be Hard to Handle". Three songs from the play were dropped—"The Touch of Your Hand", "Something Had to Happen" and "You're Devastating". Two songs were added to this film, "I Won't Dance" (resurrected from the flop Kern show Three Sisters) and "Lovely to Look At", which both became #1 hits in 1935. The latter addition was nominated for the Best Song Oscar. The songs "I Won't Dance" and "Lovely to Look At" have remained so popular that they are now almost always included in revivals and recordings of Roberta.

Roberta is the third Astaire-Rogers film, and the only one to be remade with other actors. MGM did so in 1952, entitling the new Technicolor version Lovely to Look At. MGM had bought Roberta in 1945 with the intention of producing a remake, keeping it out of general circulation until the 1970s. Roberta was the first of three pairings for Irene Dunne and Randolph Scott; High, Wide and Handsome (1937) and My Favorite Wife (1940) were the other two.

== Plot ==
John Kent, a former star football player at Harvard, goes to Paris with his friend Huck Haines and Huck's dance band, the Wabash Indianians. Alexander Voyda has booked the band, but refuses to let them play when he finds the musicians are not the Indians he expected, but merely from Indiana.

John turns to the only person he knows in Paris for help, his Aunt Minnie, who owns the fashionable "Roberta" gown shop. While there, he meets her chief assistant (and secretly the head designer), Stephanie. John is quickly smitten with her.

Meanwhile, Huck unexpectedly stumbles upon someone he knows very well. "Countess Scharwenka", a temperamental customer at Roberta's, turns out to be his hometown sweetheart Lizzie Gatz. She gets Huck's band an engagement at the nightclub where she is a featured entertainer, and Huck agrees to keep her true identity a secret.

Two things trouble John: One is Ladislaw, a handsome, deposed Russian prince and doorman, who seems too interested in Stephanie. The other is the memory of Sophie, the snobbish, conceited girlfriend he left behind after they quarreled about his lack of sophistication and polish.

When Aunt Minnie dies unexpectedly without leaving a will, John inherits the shop. Knowing nothing about women's fashion and aware that his aunt intended for Stephanie to inherit the business, he persuades Stephanie to remain on as his partner. Correspondents flock to hear what a football player has to say about feminine fashions. Huck gives the answers, making a lot of weird statements about the innovations John is planning to introduce.

Sophie arrives in Paris, attracted by John's good fortune. She enters the shop, looking for a dress, but is dissatisfied with everything Stephanie shows her. Huck persuades her to choose a gown that John had ordered to be discarded as too vulgar. When John sees her in it, they quarrel for the final time.

John reproaches Stephanie for selling Sophie the gown. Terribly hurt, Stephanie quits the shop. With Roberta putting on a fashion show in a week, Huck takes over the design work, with predictably bad results. When Stephanie sees his awful creations, she is persuaded to return to save Roberta's reputation.

The show is a triumph, helped by the entertainment provided by Huck, Countess Scharwenka, and the band. The climax is a gown modeled by Stephanie herself. At the show, John overhears that she and Ladislaw are leaving Paris and mistakenly assumes that they have married. Later, he congratulates her for becoming a princess. When she informs him that Ladislaw is merely her cousin and that the title has been hers since birth, the lovers are reunited. Huck and Lizzie, who decide to get married, do a final tap dance sequel.

== Cast ==
- Irene Dunne as Princess Stephanie
- Fred Astaire as Huck Haines
- Ginger Rogers as Scharwenka, also known as Elizabeth Gatz
- Randolph Scott as John Kent
- Helen Westley as Madame Roberta, John's Aunt Minnie
- Claire Dodd as Sophie
- Victor Varconi as Prince Ladislaw
- Luis Alberni as Alexander Petrovich Moskovitch Voyda, nightclub owner
- Ferdinand Munier as Lord Henry Delves
- Torben Meyer as Albert
- Adrian Rosley as Professor
- Bodil Rosing as Fernande

Members of the band (uncredited)

- Candy Candido
- Muzzy Marcellino
- Hal Borne
- Gene Sheldon
- Bill Carey
- Paul McLarand
- Charles Sharpe
- Phil Cuthbert
- William Dunn
- Delmon Davis
- Ivan Dow
- Howard Lally

Cast notes:

- Lucille Ball, with platinum blond hair, appears in her first RKO film as a model wearing an elaborate feather cape, after the vocal by Dunne, in the fashion show.

== Musical numbers ==
Only four songs from the stage musical – "Smoke Gets in Your Eyes," "Yesterdays," "I'll Be Hard to Handle" and "Let's Begin"-– were used in the film; some of Harbach's lyrics were altered to avoid censorship problems. Music from three other songs from the stage play – "You're Devastating," "The Touch of Your Hand" and "Don't Ask Me Not to Sing" – were used in the background. "I Won't Dance" was originally presented in Three Sisters, a 1934 music by Jerome Kern and Otto Harbach, but Oscar Hammerstein II's lyrics were augmented by Dorothy Fields and Jimmy McHugh, who received screen credit for "Additional lyrics". One song, "Lovely to Look At" was composed for the film, and was nominated for an Academy Award.

The dance arrangements were by Fred Astaire, and the dance director was Hermes Pan, the first time he was so credited (as "assistant dance director"). Astaire choreographed his dances two weeks before Kern had finished the score.

- "The Pipe Organ Number": Astaire performing on the hands of his band arranged as a keyboard
- "Let's Begin": Comedy song and dance number by Astaire, Candy Candido and Gene Sheldon, with band (music by Jerome Kern, lyrics by Otto Harbach)
- "Russian Lullaby": Sung by Dunne with balalaika orchestra (traditional)
- "I'll Be Hard to Handle": Double dance by Astaire and Rogers, a tap number in which they "talk with their feet" (music by Jerome Kern, lyrics by Bernard Dougall)
- "Yesterdays": Sung by Dunne, with guitar and string bass accompaniment (music by Jerome Kern, lyrics by Otto Harbach)
- "I Won't Dance": Sung by Rogers and Astaire, Astaire introduces at piano; followed by a solo dance to the melody by Astaire (music by Jerome Kern, lyrics by Oscar Hammerstein II, Dorothy Fields and Jimmy McHugh) Hal Borne, who played one of the "Wabash Indianaians", and was Astaire's real-life rehearsal pianist, played piano off-screen with Astaire as part of the piano introduction.
- "Smoke Gets in Your Eyes": Sung by Dunne; reprise danced by Rogers and Astaire (music by Jerome Kern, lyrics by Otto Harbach)
- "Fashion Pageant": Parade of models in an array of costumes to a medley of songs, with Astaire as master of ceremonies
- "Lovely to Look At": Dunne solo, Astaire reprise, and Rogers and Astaire dance (music by Jerome Kern, lyrics by Oscar Hammerstein II, Dorothy Fields and Jimmy McHugh)
- "Finale Dance": Astaire and Rogers

== Production ==
RKO outbid MGM and Paramount for the rights to the stage play, paying $65,000. Roberta was in production from November 26, 1934 to January 21, 1935. The rehearsal period lasted nine weeks. Shooting was postponed to accommodate the marriage of Ginger Rogers to actor Lew Ayres.

The studio borrowed Randolph Scott from Paramount for the film.

Several of the scenes in the film were written while the film was in production. Screenwriter Alan Scott and producer Pandro S. Berman were traveling across the country by train at the time, so the new scenes were telegraphed to the set from the train.

== Reception ==
According to RKO records, the film made $1,467,000 in the US and Canada and $868,000 elsewhere, resulting in a profit of $770,000. The film reportedly broke box office records wherever it was exhibited.

== Adaptations ==
MGM bought the rights to Roberta in 1945 in order to produce a Technicolor remake, which was released in 1952 as Lovely to Look At, starring Kathryn Grayson, Red Skelton and Howard Keel and directed by Mervyn LeRoy. MGM kept Roberta out of general circulation until the 1970s, although two television versions starring Bob Hope were broadcast by NBC in 1955 and 1958.

== In popular culture ==
The Venetian fashion house Roberta di Camerino, founded by Giuliana Camerino in 1945, was named for the film.
