= Three Sisters (musical) =

- A Musical Play
- Original sheet music cover
- Music: Jerome Kern
- Lyrics: Oscar Hammerstein II
- Book: Oscar Hammerstein II
- Productions: 1934 West End

Three Sisters is a musical written by Oscar Hammerstein II (lyrics and book) and Jerome Kern (music). It concerns the romantic lives of three sisters.

The musical was originally produced in London at the Theatre Royal, Drury Lane in 1934 and was not a success. It introduced the song "I Won't Dance", and also includes "Lonely Feet", "Hand in Hand", "Now I Have Springtime", and "My Beautiful Circus Girl".

== Plot ==
At the beginning of World War I, in 1914, three sisters travel the English countryside with their widowed father Will Barbour, a traveling photographer who works at local fairs. The eldest daughter, Tiny, is engaged to Eustace, an earnest if slightly dull constable, although she is attracted to George, an adventurous carnival performer. Dorrie, the middle daughter, is ashamed of her itinerant upbringing and seeks to marry into the aristocracy and enter high society. The youngest daughter, Mary, falls for a gypsy performer. The men are sent to the Western Front in France to fight, while the women remain home.

== Productions ==
The original production opened in London at the Theatre Royal, Drury Lane on April 19, 1934. It featured Victoria Hopper, Stanley Holloway, Adele Dixon, Esmond Knight, and Charlotte Greenwood. Reception was mixed, and the musical closed after two months. Kern and Hammerstein did not produce Three Sisters in the US, and it was Kern's last new show to appear in the West End.

Greg MacKellan presented a concert reading at the New Conservatory Theatre in San Francisco, California, in 1995. MacKellan used a grant from the National Endowment of the Arts in 2010 to reconstruct the script and score, as parts were missing. The following year, his company, 42nd Street Moon, presented the American debut of Three Sisters in San Francisco at the Eureka Theatre for a three-week run.

== Legacy ==
Although this show was not considered a success and never made it to Broadway, the song "I Won't Dance" was later included in the film version of Roberta (1935). and became so popular in that context that it is almost always included in stage revivals and cast recordings of Roberta. The song "Lonely Feet" was sung by Irene Dunne in the 1934 film adaptation of the Jerome Kern-Oscar Hammerstein musical Sweet Adeline.
