= List of Billboard Best Selling Pop Albums number ones of 1951 =

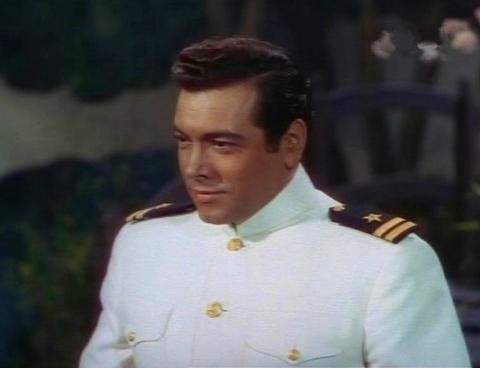
Two albums recorded by Mario Lanza (pictured in 1949) topped the charts in 1951. His album Mario Lanza Sings Selections from The Great Caruso, featuring songs from the film The Great Caruso, topped the 33 1/3 and 45 rpm chart for ten weeks each from June to August. His Christmas record Mario Lanza Sings Christmas Songs reached number one on both charts in late December.

The Billboard magazine publishes a weekly chart that ranks the best-selling albums in the United States. The chart nowadays known as the Billboard 200 was titled Best Selling Pop Albums in 1951. Starting with the issue dated July 22, 1950, Billboard decided to split the popular albums chart between the two common album formats at the time–33 1/3 rpm and 45 rpm, because the versions of the albums were often not released simultaneously and larger retailers had issues filling out Billboards questionnaire.

The cast recording of the 1949 musical South Pacific, composed by Richard Rodgers and mainly recorded by Ezio Pinza and Mary Martin, spent nineteen combined weeks on top between January and April. The most dominant individual artist in 1951 was Mario Lanza. Three albums recorded by Lanza topped the charts for thirty combined weeks. The first of which, his album Mario Lanza Sings Popular Songs from the M-G-M Technicolor Motion Picture "The Toast of New Orleans" featuring songs from the 1950 film The Toast of New Orleans, which Lanza starred in, topped the 45 rpm chart for six weeks in February and March. The album Mario Lanza Sings Selections from The Great Caruso, featuring songs from his follow-up film The Great Caruso, reigned atop each of the charts for ten consecutive weeks. The album sold more than 100,000 copies before the film was released and became the first LP to sell more than one million copies in the US. Finally, Lanza's Christmas album Mario Lanza Sings Christmas Songs was number one for the final two weeks of the year on both charts. This made 1951 the first year since the charts inception in 1945, that Bing Crosby's Merry Christmas did not reach number one in December. (Note: Bing Crosby's Merry Christmas first reached the top of the album chart in the issue dated December 8, 1945. It spent at least one week atop the chart, every christmas season until January 1951. In December 1951, it peaked at number four on both charts, in the last issue.) Billboard did not issue a year-end chart for albums in 1951. The women's album that reigned at the top of the Billboard was The Voice of Xtabay of Yma Sumac in which she remained at the top for 6 weeks.

== Chart history ==
Chart history
Issue date	33 1/3 R.P.M.			45 R.P.M.			Ref.
Issue date	Album	Artist(s)	Label	Album	Artist(s)	Label	Ref.
January 6	Merry Christmas	Bing Crosby	Decca	Merry Christmas	Bing Crosby	Decca	
January 13	South Pacific	Original Cast	Columbia	Merry Christmas	Bing Crosby	Decca	
January 20	South Pacific	Original Cast	Columbia	South Pacific	Original Cast	Columbia	
January 27	South Pacific	Original Cast	Columbia	South Pacific	Original Cast	Columbia	
February 3	South Pacific	Original Cast	Columbia	South Pacific	Original Cast	Columbia	
February 10	South Pacific	Original Cast	Columbia	South Pacific	Original Cast	Columbia	
February 17	South Pacific	Original Cast	Columbia	South Pacific	Original Cast	Columbia	
February 24	South Pacific	Original Cast	Columbia	The Toast of New Orleans	Mario Lanza	RCA Victor	
March 3	South Pacific	Original Cast	Columbia	The Toast of New Orleans	Mario Lanza	RCA Victor	
March 10	South Pacific	Original Cast	Columbia	The Toast of New Orleans	Mario Lanza	RCA Victor	
March 17	Guys and Dolls	Original Cast	Decca	The Toast of New Orleans	Mario Lanza	RCA Victor	
March 24	South Pacific	Original Cast	Columbia	The Toast of New Orleans	Mario Lanza	RCA Victor	
March 31	South Pacific	Original Cast	Columbia	The Toast of New Orleans	Mario Lanza	RCA Victor	
April 7	South Pacific	Original Cast	Columbia	Voice of the Xtabay	Yma Sumac	Capitol	
April 14	South Pacific	Original Cast	Columbia	Voice of the Xtabay	Yma Sumac	Capitol	
April 21	South Pacific	Original Cast	Columbia	Lullaby of Broadway	Doris Day / Soundtrack	Columbia	
April 28	Voice of the Xtabay	Yma Sumac	Capitol Records	Voice of the Xtabay	Yma Sumac	Capitol	
May 5	Voice of the Xtabay	Yma Sumac	Capitol Records	Voice of the Xtabay	Yma Sumac	Capitol	
May 12	Voice of the Xtabay	Yma Sumac	Capitol Records	Lullaby of Broadway	Doris Day / Soundtrack	Columbia	
May 19	Voice of the Xtabay	Yma Sumac	Capitol Records	Voice of the Xtabay & Lullaby of Broadway tied	Yma Sumac & Doris Day tied	Capitol & Columbia tied	
May 26	Voice of the Xtabay	Yma Sumac	Capitol Records	Voice of the Xtabay	Yma Sumac	Capitol	
June 2	Voice of the Xtabay	Yma Sumac	Capitol Records	Mario Lanza Sings Selections from The Great Caruso	Mario Lanza	RCA Victor	
June 9	Mario Lanza Sings Selections from The Great Caruso	Mario Lanza	RCA Victor	Mario Lanza Sings Selections from The Great Caruso	Mario Lanza	RCA Victor	
June 16	Mario Lanza Sings Selections from The Great Caruso	Mario Lanza	RCA Victor	Mario Lanza Sings Selections from The Great Caruso	Mario Lanza	RCA Victor	
June 23	Mario Lanza Sings Selections from The Great Caruso	Mario Lanza	RCA Victor	Mario Lanza Sings Selections from The Great Caruso	Mario Lanza	RCA Victor	
June 30	Mario Lanza Sings Selections from The Great Caruso	Mario Lanza	RCA Victor	Mario Lanza Sings Selections from The Great Caruso	Mario Lanza	RCA Victor	
July 7	Mario Lanza Sings Selections from The Great Caruso	Mario Lanza	RCA Victor	Mario Lanza Sings Selections from The Great Caruso	Mario Lanza	RCA Victor	
July 14	Mario Lanza Sings Selections from The Great Caruso	Mario Lanza	RCA Victor	Mario Lanza Sings Selections from The Great Caruso	Mario Lanza	RCA Victor	
July 21	Mario Lanza Sings Selections from The Great Caruso	Mario Lanza	RCA Victor	Mario Lanza Sings Selections from The Great Caruso	Mario Lanza	RCA Victor	
July 28	Mario Lanza Sings Selections from The Great Caruso	Mario Lanza	RCA Victor	Mario Lanza Sings Selections from The Great Caruso	Mario Lanza	RCA Victor	
August 4	Mario Lanza Sings Selections from The Great Caruso	Mario Lanza	RCA Victor	Mario Lanza Sings Selections from The Great Caruso	Mario Lanza	RCA Victor	
August 11	Mario Lanza Sings Selections from The Great Caruso	Mario Lanza	RCA Victor	Show Boat	Soundtrack	MGM	
August 18	Show Boat	Soundtrack	MGM	Show Boat	Soundtrack	MGM	
August 25	Show Boat	Soundtrack	MGM	Show Boat	Soundtrack	MGM	
September 1	Show Boat	Soundtrack	MGM	Show Boat	Soundtrack	MGM	
September 8	Show Boat	Soundtrack	MGM	Show Boat	Soundtrack	MGM	
September 15	Show Boat	Soundtrack	MGM	Show Boat	Soundtrack	MGM	
September 22	Show Boat	Soundtrack	MGM	Show Boat	Soundtrack	MGM	
September 29	Show Boat	Soundtrack	MGM	Show Boat	Soundtrack	MGM	
October 6	Show Boat	Soundtrack	MGM	Show Boat	Soundtrack	MGM	
October 13	Show Boat	Soundtrack	MGM	Show Boat	Soundtrack	MGM	
October 20	Show Boat	Soundtrack	MGM	Show Boat	Soundtrack	MGM	
October 27	Show Boat	Soundtrack	MGM	Show Boat	Soundtrack	MGM	
November 3	Show Boat	Soundtrack	MGM	Show Boat	Soundtrack	MGM	
November 10	Show Boat	Soundtrack	MGM	Show Boat	Soundtrack	MGM	
November 17	Show Boat	Soundtrack	MGM	Show Boat	Soundtrack	MGM	
November 24	Show Boat	Soundtrack	MGM	Show Boat	Soundtrack	MGM	
December 1	Show Boat	Soundtrack	MGM	Show Boat	Soundtrack	MGM	
December 8	Show Boat	Soundtrack	MGM	Show Boat	Soundtrack	MGM	
December 15	Show Boat	Soundtrack	MGM	Show Boat	Soundtrack	MGM	
December 22	Mario Lanza Sings Christmas Songs	Mario Lanza	RCA Victor	Mario Lanza Sings Christmas Songs	Mario Lanza	RCA Victor	
December 29	Mario Lanza Sings Christmas Songs	Mario Lanza	RCA Victor	Mario Lanza Sings Christmas Songs	Mario Lanza	RCA Victor	

== See also ==
- 1951 in music
- List of number-one albums (United States)
