= Serenade (disambiguation) =

A serenade, in its most general sense, is a musical composition and/or performance intended to honour an individual. It may also refer to:

== Books ==
- Serenade (novel), a 1937 novel by James M. Cain
- Serenade (poetry collection), a 1930 anthology by J. Slauerhoff
- Serenade, a 2011 novel by Zülfü Livaneli

== Film ==
- The Serenade (film), a 1916 American film featuring Oliver Hardy
- Serenade (1921 film), an American film directed by Raoul Walsh
- Serenade (1927 film), an American film starring Adolphe Menjou
- Serenade (1937 film), a German film directed by Willi Forst
- Serenade (1940 film), a French film starring Lilian Harvey
- Serenade (1956 film), an American film starring Mario Lanza, based on the novel by James M. Cain

== Music ==
=== Groups ===
- Serenade Chamber Orchestra, an Armenian orchestra founded in 1991
- We Are Serenades, a.k.a. Serenades, a Swedish pop duo

=== Classical compositions ===
- Serenades (Brahms), two of the earliest efforts by Johannes Brahms to write orchestral music
- Ständchen, D 889 (Schubert), a lied by Franz Schubert whose title is usually translated in English as Serenade
- Sérénade, by Charles Gounod
- Serenade (Stravinsky), a composition for solo piano completed by Igor Stravinsky in 1925
- Serenade (Bruch), a 1900 composition for violin and orchestra by Max Bruch
- The Serenade, an 1897 Broadway operetta with music and lyrics by Victor Herbert and book by Harry B. Smith

=== Albums ===
- Serenade (Neil Diamond album) (1974)
- Serenade (Katherine Jenkins album) (2006)
- Mario Lanza in "Serenade", or simply Serenade, a 1956 soundtrack album by Mario Lanza
- Serenades (album), the 1993 debut album by the British rock band Anathema
- Serenade, a 1994 BZN album

=== Songs ===
- "Serenade" (The Student Prince song), a song from the operetta The Student Prince and the 1954 film, where it was sung by Mario Lanza
- "Serenade" (song from Serenade), a song from the 1956 film Serenade, sung by Mario Lanza
- "Serenade", a 1976 song from the album Fly Like an Eagle by the Steve Miller Band
- "Serenade", a 1983 song from the album Steeler by Steeler
- "Serenade" (Dover song) (1997)
- "Serenade" (Shades song) (1997)
- "Serenade" (Tackey & Tsubasa song) (2004)

== Other uses ==
- MV Serenade, a French ocean liner and later cruise ship
- Serenade (ballet), a 1934 ballet by George Balanchine
- Serenade (TV series), a 1959 Australian TV series
- Serenade, a NetNavi character in video game Mega Man Battle Network 3
- Serenade, a character in the video game Eternal Sonata
- Serenade (Hong Kong), a private housing estate in Tai Hang, Causeway Bay, Hong Kong

== See also ==
- Serenade for Strings (disambiguation)
- Serenata (disambiguation)
