= Seven Hills of Rome (album) =

Soundtrack album by Mario Lanza
- Released: 1958
- Label: RCA Victor

Mario Lanza chronology
Mario Lanza in "Serenade" (1956)	Seven Hills of Rome (1958)	For the First Time (1959)

Seven Hills of Rome is a soundtrack album by tenor Mario Lanza containing songs featured in the 1958 Metro-Goldwyn-Mayer film Seven Hills of Rome that he starred in. The album was released by RCA Victor in the same year.

== Release ==
The album was released on the RCA Victor record label in 1958 – to coincide with the release of the film.

The album was available on LP (cat. no. LM-2211).

== Reception ==
The album peaked at number 7 on Billboard's Best-Selling Pop LPs chart for the week of 24 March 1958.

== Track listing ==
LP (RCA Victor LM-2211)

Side 1
No.	Title	Writer(s)	Length
1.	"Seven Hills of Rome"	Adamson–Young
2.	"Italiano Calypso"	Stoll
3.	"Lolita"	Buzzi-Peccia
4.	"Questa o quella"	Verdi
5.	"Arrivederci Roma"	Garinei–Giovannini–Sigman–Rascel
6.	"Imitation sequence" • "Temptation" • "Jezebel" • "Memories Are Made of This" • When the Saints Go Marching In""	Brown; Shanklin; Gilkyson–Rich Dehr–Miller; Trad. (Arr. George Stoll)
7.	"Come Dance with Me"	Blake–Leibert

Side 2
No.	Title	Writer(s)	Note(s)	Length
1.	"Never till Now"	Webster–Green	from Raintree County
2.	"Do You Wonder"	Ray–Hill
3.	"Earthbound"	Taylor–Richardson–Musel
4.	"Serenade"	Cahn–Brodszky	from Serenade
5.	"My Destiny"	Cahn–Brodszky	from Serenade
6.	"Love in a Home"	Mercer–DePaul	from Li'l Abner

== Charts ==
Chart (1958)	Peak position
US Billboard Best Selling Pop LPs	7
