= For the First Time (Mario Lanza album) =

Soundtrack album by Mario Lanza
- Released: 1959
- Label: RCA Victor

Mario Lanza chronology
Seven Hills of Rome (1958)	For the First Time (1959)

For the First Time is a soundtrack album by tenor Mario Lanza containing songs featured in the 1959 Corona Films production For the First Time that he starred in. The album was released by RCA Victor in the same year.

== Release ==
The soundtrack album was issued by RCA Victor in 1959 to coincide with the release of the film. The album was issued in mono and stereo on LP, under catalog numbers LM/LSC-2338.

In 1981, the album was reissued with new cover art on the RCA Gold Seal label, catalog number AGL1-3977. In 1991, The album was reissued on compact disc coupled with the soundtrack for That Midnight Kiss.

There was also an EP titled For the First Time (cat. no. EPA-4344) containing five songs from the album.

== Reception ==
Professional ratings
Review scores
Source	Rating
Billboard	positive ("Spotlight" pick)

Billboard chose the album for its "Spotlight winners of the week" section, listing it one of the albums with the "strongest sales potential". The review stated: "The tunes are melodic, and Lanza wraps them up pleasantly and lyrically. A good cover shot of Mario Lanza [...] and sound are plus factors."

The album peaked at number 7 on Billboard's stereo LPs chart and at number 13 on the mono chart.

== Track listing ==
LP (RCA Victor LM-2338)

All the tracks are taken from the soundtrack of the Corona Films production For the First Time.

Side 1
No.	Title	Writer(s)	Length
1.	"Come prima"	Panzeri–Taccani–Di Paola	3:23
2.	"Tarantella"	Stoll	2:19
3.	"O sole mio"	Di Capua	2:27
4.	"Neapolitan Dance"	Stoll	1:38
5.	"Hofbrauhaus Song"	Bette–Hauff	1:32
6.	"O, mon amour"	Asso–Monnot	1:14
7.	"Mazurka"	Stoll	1:27
8.	"Pineapple Pickers"	Stoll	1:40

Side 2
No.	Title	Writer(s)	Length
1.	"Vesti la giubba"	Leoncavallo – Pagliacci	3:31
2.	"Finale"	Verdi – Othello	4:36
3.	"Act I"	Verdi – Aida	4:32
4.	"Ich liebe dich"	Grieg	2:31
5.	"Ave Maria"	Schubert	3:02

EP (RCA Victor EPA-4344)

Side 1
No.	Title	Writer(s)	Length
1.	"Come prima"	Panzeri–Taccani–Di Paola
2.	"Pineapple Pickers"	Stoll

Side 2
No.	Title	Writer(s)	Length
1.	"O, mon amour"	Asso–Monnot
2.	"O sole mio"	Russo–Di Capua
5.	"Hofbrauhaus Song"	Bette–Hauff

== Charts ==
Chart (1959)	Peak position
US Billboard Top LPs – Best Selling Monophonic LPs	13
US Billboard Top LPs – Best Selling Stereophonic LPs	5

=== EP ===
Chart (1959)	Peak position
US Billboard Best Selling Pop EPs	2

== Awards ==
Year	Award type	Categories	Results	Ref.
1959	Grammy Awards	Best Sound Track Album, Original Cast – Motion Picture or Television	Nominated	
