= Jean Fenn =

American soprano (1928–2021)

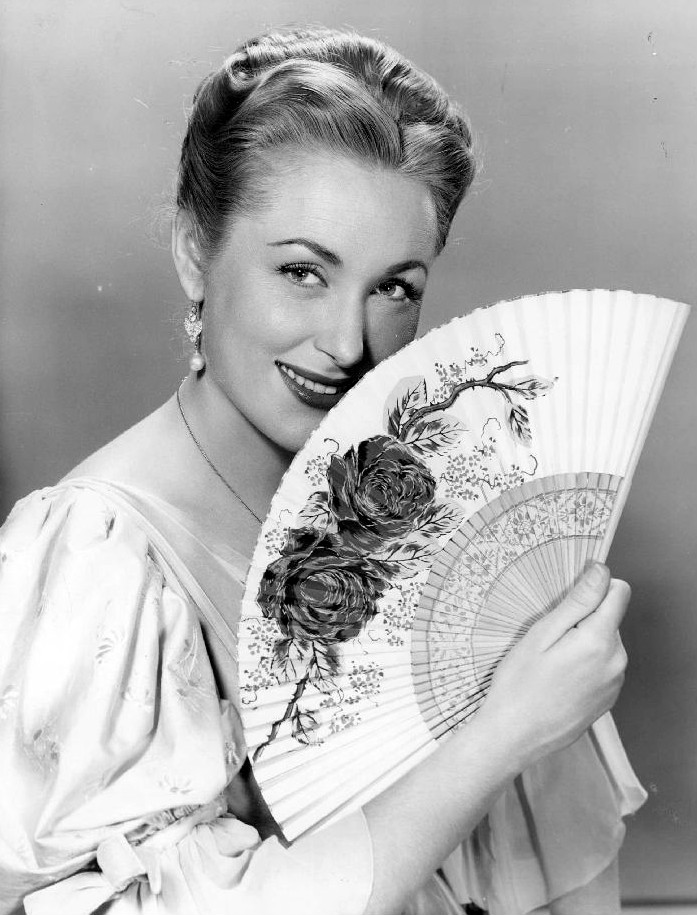
- Fenn in 1956
- Born: May 10, 1928; Riverside, Illinois, U.S.
- Died: October 20, 2021 (aged 93); Poulsbo, Washington, U.S.
- Occupation: Singer
- Years active: 1949–1991

Jean Fenn (May 10, 1928 – October 20, 2021) was an American soprano who had an active opera career in North America during the 1950s through the 1970s. Fenn was a disciplined, well-schooled singer with an excellent technique, wide range, and a highly polished sound. She was notably a regular performer at the Metropolitan Opera in New York City between 1953 and 1970. A lyric soprano, she particularly excelled in portraying roles from the operas of Giacomo Puccini, Jules Massenet, and Charles Gounod.

In spite of her obvious talent, Fenn never achieved opera stardom. At the Metropolitan Opera, she performed with many of the mid-20th century operatic greats and standing in such a crowd, she never managed to distinguish herself. In his book The Last Prima Donnas, music critic Lanfranco Rasponi included Fenn in his list of American divas "who showed so much promise (all were talented and had good basic vocal resources) only to go into limbo". Critics have suggested that Fenn's quality was perhaps too polished and that prevented her from having that star making quality. Noël Coward said of her during rehearsals for one of his productions, "She is cursed with refinement and does everything 'beautifully.' Oh dear, I long for her to pick her nose or fart and before I'm through with her, she'll do both."

Fenn's voice is preserved on the soundtrack to the film Serenade (1956) in which she sings with tenor Mario Lanza. She appears on several live recordings made during the Metropolitan Opera radio broadcasts, including many performances as Musetta in La bohème recorded between 1953 and 1969. A 1967 live recording of her performing the title role in Tosca with Richard Tucker as Cavaradossi at the Academy of Music in Philadelphia was released by Lyric Distribution ALD in 1989 and again in 2000 by House of Opera.

== Life and career ==
Born in Riverside, Illinois, on May 10, 1928, Fenn was the daughter of Swedish and English parents. Her sister Marie Story (née Fenn) was also a soprano who had a minor career. She attended Stephens College and after graduating moved to Los Angeles, California, to pursue further studies in opera at Los Angeles City College. While there she studied voice with Florence Holtzman and participated in the opera theatre program which was run by renowned Russian tenor Vladimir Rosing. Fenn also studied privately with Amelita Galli-Curci and her husband Homer Samuels in California. She later received vocal coaching from Sigmund Romberg and Erich Korngold.

In 1949, while still a student, Fenn sang in her first opera with the Hollywood Reading Club portraying Blonde in Mozart's The Abduction from the Seraglio and that same year appeared in productions with the Guild Opera Company of Southern California. She made her debut with the San Francisco Opera on October 10, 1952 as Musetta in Puccini's La Bohème with Bidu Sayão as Mimì, Jan Peerce as Rodolfo, Frank Valentino as Marcello, and Gaetano Merola conducting. She sang several more performances with the SFO that year, portraying Elena in Boito's Mefistofele and Nedda in Leoncavallo's Pagliacci.

Fenn made her first opera appearance in New York with the New York City Opera on March 28, 1953 as Musetta. The production also notably marked Norman Treigle's first performance with the company in the role of Colline. She later returned to that house in 1955 to sing two roles with the company, Oxana in Tchaikovsky's Cherevichki (performed under the title The Golden Slipper) and Violetta in Verdi's La traviata. She also sang the role of Nedda with the company during the late 1950s.

=== Metropolitan Opera ===
In 1953, Fenn joined the roster of principal sopranos at the Metropolitan Opera, making her debut with the company on November 11 of that year as Musetta to the Mimì of Hilde Güden, Rodolfo of Eugene Conley, and Marcello of Robert Merrill. That same cast was later appeared on the December 19, 1953 Met broadcast of La Bohème. Fenn performed at the Met regularly over the next seventeen years, being absent from the house only from 1957–1958 and 1960–1962. After appearing as one of the flower maidens in Wagner's Parsifal, she sang her only Violetta in La Traviata with the Met in 1954, replacing an indisposed Licia Albanese who was in turn replacing an indisposed Dorothy Kirsten. In 1955, she added two roles to her Met repertoire: Marguerite in Gounod's Faust, with Thomas Hayward in the title role, and Zdenka in Arabella by Richard Stauss, with Eleanor Steber in the title role.

After a two-year absence from the Metropolitan, Fenn returned in April 1959 to portray Rosalinde in Die Fledermaus by Johann Strauss, with Theodor Uppman as Eisenstein and Laurel Hurley as Adele. That role along with Musetta became her bread and butter at the house. Fenn's next new role at the Met was in the title role of Massenet's Manon in 1964, with Richard Verreau as Des Grieux and Gabriel Bacquier as Lescaut, first stepping in for Teresa Stratas. That same year she performed her first lead Wagner role at the house, portraying Eva in Die Meistersinger von Nürnberg, with Paul Schöffler as Hans Sachs. In 1965, she added Antonia in Offenbach's Les Contes d'Hoffmann to her performance credits. Fenn performed four more roles at the Met in 1967, the First Lady in Mozart's The Magic Flute, the title role Lady Harriet in Flotow's Martha, Mimì (although Musetta would remain her more frequently assailed role in the opera), and the title role in Puccini's Tosca. Her last new role at the Met was Micaela in Bizet's Carmen which she first sang at the house in 1968 opposite Regina Resnik in the title role. Fenn's final and 126th performance at the Met was on January 23, 1970 as the First Lady alongside Edda Moser as the Queen of the Night.

Fenn was featured in a number of Met broadcasts, including Faust on April 9, 1966 (with Nicolai Gedda in the title role, William Walker as Valentine, Cesare Siepi as Mefistofeles, and Georges Prêtre conducting), Die Meistersinger on January 14, 1967 (with Giorgio Tozzi, Sándor Kónya, Ezio Flagello, Murray Dickie, Karl Doench, Mildred Miller, and Joseph Rosenstock conducting), and Martha on February 3, 1968 (with Rosalind Elias, John Alexander, Donald Gramm, Lorenzo Alvary, and Franz Allers conducting), to name just a few.

=== North America ===
While singing at the Met, Fenn also appeared with other opera companies throughout North America. She was a regular performer with the Los Angeles Civic Light Opera (LALCO) during the 1950s and 1960s, and a personal close friend of that company's director, Edwin Lester. In 1954, she made her debut with the New Orleans Opera in the title role of Massenet's Thaïs with Mack Harrell as Athanael. She returned to that company several more times, including portraying the title role in Puccini's Manon Lescaut in 1969 and Tosca in 1970.

In 1956, she appeared in the film Serenade with Mario Lanza and that same year appeared as Rosalinde in Producers' Showcase's production of Die Fledermaus. In 1967, she sang Desdemona in Verdi's Otello for the Seattle Opera, and made her debut with the Philadelphia Grand Opera Company (PGOC) as Tosca with Richard Tucker as Cavaradossi. She later returned to that house in 1974 to portray Marguerite to Enrico Di Giuseppe's Faust. That same year she sang Mimì to Luciano Rampaso's Rodolfo in the last production presented by the Philadelphia Lyric Opera Company before it merged with the PGOC to become the Opera Company of Philadelphia. She also appeared in operas with Opera Memphis, the Opera Company of Boston, the Cincinnati Opera, the Houston Grand Opera, the Pittsburgh Opera, and the San Antonio Grand Opera Festival among others.

Fenn also almost made it onto Broadway twice. She notably starred as Verity Craig in the original production of Noël Coward's Sail Away when it opened in Boston in 1961 before its New York run. However, Coward significantly revamped the show in the midst of further previews in Philadelphia, merging Fenn's role with that of Elaine Stritch's part. In 1969, she portrayed Queen Isabella in the world premiere of Meredith Willson's musical 1491 at the LALCO with Chita Rivera as Beatriz and John Cullum as Christopher Columbus. Although slated for Broadway, the production never made it out of Los Angeles. She made her final performance in 1991, with the Bremerton Symphony.

=== Personal life ===
Fenn died in Poulsbo, Washington, on October 20, 2021, at age 93.
