= Arrivederci Roma =

Single by Mario Lanza

from the album Seven Hills of Rome
- Language: Italian
- English title: "Goodbye Rome"
- B-side: "Younger Than Springtime"
- Published: 1957
- Released: February 1958
- Genre: Pop
- Length: 2:45
- Label: RCA Victor
- Composer: Renato Rascel
- Lyricists: Pietro Garinei; Sandro Giovannini; Carl Sigman (English)

"Arrivederci Roma" (English: "Goodbye, Rome") is the title and refrain of a popular Italian song, composed in 1955 by Renato Rascel, with lyrics by Pietro Garinei and Sandro Giovannini. It was published in 1957 as part of the soundtrack of the Italo-American musical film with the same title, released as Seven Hills of Rome in English. In the movie, the song is sung by the leading character, played by the American singer and actor Mario Lanza. Carl Sigman wrote the lyrics for the English-language version of the movie.

Another version of the song, with the same melody but a new set of English lyrics by Jack Fishman, was published in 1955 with the title "Arrivederci Darling". Both versions of the song, in Italian and English, enjoyed lasting and widespread success in the following years.

== "Arrivederci Roma" lyrics ==
Arrivederci (contraction of a rivederci), which literally means "until we see each other again", is a common Italian equivalent of "goodbye". The original lyrics express the nostalgia of a Roman man for the dinners and short-lived love affairs he had with foreign tourists who came to Rome. It recalls the popular legend associated with the Trevi Fountain.

== Popularity ==
The recording of "Arrivederci Darling" by British singer Anne Shelton remained in the UK Singles Chart for four weeks (December 17, 1955, to January 7, 1956, peaking at number 17). Another recording by Edna Savage was in the UK chart for one week (January 14, 1956, at number 19).

Michael Dees performs the song during the final montage, and end credits, of The Simpsons Season 10 Episode 19, "Mom and Pop Art".

== Recorded versions ==
"Arrivederci Roma"

- 101 Strings Orchestra
- The Ames Brothers (1963)
- Bing Crosby (1956)
- Claudio Villa
- Cliff Richard, When in Rome (1965)
- Connie Francis (1959)
- Mario Lanza - Italian and English versions
- Dean Martin
- Deana Martin, Volare (2009)
- Dionne Warwick
- Eddie Fisher (1962)
- Edmundo Ros
- Emilio Pericoli
- Georgia Gibbs – "Goodbye Rome", B-side of "24 Hours A Day", Mercury 70743 (1955)
- Guy Lombardo
- Il Volo
- James Last
- Jerry Vale
- Julius LaRosa
- Kamahl
- Lester Lanin
- Luciano Tajoli
- Luciano Virgili
- Mantovani
- Narciso Parigi
- Nat King Cole
- Percy Faith
- Perry Como
- Renato Rascel
- Richard Clayderman
- Roger Williams
- Sam Cooke
- Sergio Franchi – Our Man from Italy (1963)
- Vic Damone
- Willis "Gator" Jackson

"Arrivederci Darling"

- Anne Shelton (1955)
- Edna Savage (1955)
- Jo Stafford (1955)
- Lys Assia & The Johnston Brothers (1955)
- Three Suns (1955)
- Francisco Cavez and his orchestra (1956)
