= My Heart Is Broken in Three =

Single by Slim Whitman
- A-side: "Keep It a Secret" "My Heart Is Broken in Three"
- Released: 1952
- Length: 2:45
- Label: Imperial
- Songwriter: Ray Glaser

Slim Whitman singles chronology
"An Amateur in Love" / "By the Waters of the Minnetonka" (1952)	"My Heart Is Broken in Three" / "Keep It a Secret" (1952)	"All That I'm Asking Is Sympathy" / "How Can I Tell" (1953)

Slim Whitman UK singles chronology
"Tumbling Tumbleweeds" / "Tell Me" (1956)	"I'm a Fool" / "My Heart Is Broken in Three" (1956)	"Serenade" / "I Talk to the Waves" (1956)

Professional ratings
Review scores
Source	Rating
Billboard	positive

"My Heart Is Broken in Three" is a song written by Ray Glaser (or Glasser)

Slim Whitman released it as a single (Imperial 8169, with "Keep It a Secret" on the opposite side) in 1952.

In the UK, the song was originally released coupled with "Cold Empty Arms" (London L 1206, 1952) and some years later chosen as the filp side to "I'm a Fool" (London HL 8252, 1956).

== Track listing ==
7-inch single (Imperial 45-8134, 1952, United States)
No.	Title	Writer(s)	Length
1.	"Keep It a Secret"	Jessie Mae Robinson	2:45
2.	"My Heart Is Broken in Three"	Ray Glaser	2:45

== Spade Cooley version ==
Spade Cooley released his version on Decca (cat. no. 46376, with "The Cowboy Waltz" on the flip side) in 1951.

Professional ratings
Review scores
Source	Rating
Billboard	positive

== Charts ==
Chart (1953)	Peak position
U.S. Billboard Top Country & Western Records — Most Played in Juke Boxes	10
