= Serenata (disambiguation) =

Serenata is the Italian word for serenade.

Serenata may refer to:

== Music ==
=== Classical compositions ===
- "La serenata", 1835 song by Rossini from Soirées musicales (Rossini)
- "La serenata", 1888 song by Francesco Paolo Tosti made famous by Pavarotti and others
- La serenata Spanish-language opera by Chapi
- Serenata Notturna (1776), by Wolfgang Amadeus Mozart
- Serenata in vano (1914), quintet for clarinet, bassoon, horn, cello and double-bass by Carl Nielsen
- Concierto serenata (1952), for harp and orchestra by Joaquín Rodrigo
- Serenata for Orchestra (Piston) (1956), by Walter Piston

=== Popular music ===
==== Albums ====
- Serenata (album), a 2014 album by Alfie Boe
- Serenata, 1984 album by Maastrichts Salon Orkest & André Rieu
- Serenata, 1997 album by Beppe Gambetta
- The Serenata, 1959 album by John Young
- Serenata, 2003 album by Manny Manuel
- Serenata, 2009 album by Armik

==== Songs ====
- "Serenata", a 2015 single by Au5
- "Serenata", 1947 composition by Leroy Anderson also adapted with lyrics by Mitchell Parish, recorded by Nat King Cole in 1962 on his album Nat King Cole Sings/George Shearing Plays as well as Sarah Vaughan in 1960
- "Serenata" (Toto Cutugno song), 1984
- "Serenata" (Serena Brancale and Alessandra Amoroso song), 2025

=== Ensembles ===
- Serenata (choir), Philippine children's choir in Jeddah
- Serenata Guayanesa, vocal and instrumental quartet that plays typical Venezuelan folk music

== Other ==
- Eupithecia serenata, a moth in the family Geometridae found in Russia
- Serenata, a Bang & Olufsen and Samsung mobile telephone

== See also ==
- Serenade (disambiguation)
