= 15th Anniversary Album =

Studio album by Slim Whitman
- Released: 1967
- Genre: Country
- Label: Imperial

Slim Whitman chronology
A Time for Love (1966)	15th Anniversary Album (1967)	Country Memories (1967)

Singles from 15th Anniversary Album
- 1. "I'm a Fool" Released: June 17, 1967

Professional ratings
Review scores
Source	Rating
AllMusic	4.5/5 stars
Billboard	"Spotlight" pick
The Encyclopedia of Popular Music	3/5 stars

15th Anniversary Album is a studio album by Slim Whitman, released in 1967 on Imperial Records.

For this album, Whitman made "newly recorded renditions of the songs synonymous with his name".

== Track listing ==
The album was issued in the United States and Canada by Imperial Records as a 12-inch long-playing record, catalog numbers LP-9342 (mono) and LP-12342 (stereo).

Side one
No.	Title	Writer(s)	Length
1.	"Indian Love Call"	Hammerstein; Harbach; Friml	3:12
2.	"Bandera Waltz"	Adams	2:21
3.	"China Doll"	Cannan; Cannan	3:00
4.	"I'll Take You Home Again, Kathleen"	Turner; Whitman	2:48
5.	"Tumbling Tumbleweeds"	Bob Nolan	2:10
6.	"Serenade"	Nicholas Brodsky; Sammy Cahn	2:15
7.	"More than Yesterday"	Dickens	2:40
8.	"Love Song of the Waterfall"	Barnes; Nolan; Winge	2:35

Side two
No.	Title	Writer(s)	Length
1.	"North Wind"	Rod Morris	2:20
2.	"Rose Marie"	Hammerstein; Harbach; Friml	2:20
3.	"Cattle Call"	Tex Owens	2:07
4.	"Keep It a Secret"	Jessie Mae Robinson	2:33
5.	"I'm a Fool"	Smith	2:56
6.	"There's a Rainbow in Every Teardrop"	Pearl King; Whitman	2:12
7.	"Valley of Tears"	Antoine Domino; Dave Bartholomew	2:05
8.	"Secret Love"	Sammy Fain; Paul Francis Webster	2:36

== Charts ==
Chart (1967)	Peak position
US Top Country Albums (Billboard)	25
