= Fifteenth anniversary =

Fifteenth anniversary may refer to:

- A fifteenth wedding anniversary, sometimes known as a crystal anniversary
- Fifteenth Anniversary (Fabergé egg)
- 15th Anniversary Album, 1967 Slim Whitman studio album
