= I'm a Fool (song) =

1956 song by Slim Whitman

Single by Slim Whitman
- A-side: "I'm a Fool" "Serenade"
- Released: February 26, 1956
- Recorded: 1955
- Length: 2:30
- Label: Imperial
- Songwriter(s): Tommy Smith

Slim Whitman singles chronology
"Tumbling Tumbleweeds" (1956)	"I'm a Fool" / "Serenade" (1956)	"The Whiffenpoof Song" (1956)

Slim Whitman UK singles chronology
"Tumbling Tumbleweeds" / "Tell Me" (1956)	"I'm a Fool" / "My Heart Is Broken in Three" (1956)	"Serenade" / "I Talk to the Waves" (1956)

Audio
- "I'm a Fool" on YouTube

Professional ratings
Review scores
Source	Rating
Billboard	positive ("Spotlight" pick)

"I'm a Fool" is a song written by Tommy Smith and originally recorded by Slim Whitman.

== Track listing ==
7-inch single (Imperial X8305, 1956, United States)
No.	Title	Writer(s)	Length
1.	"I'm a Fool"	Tommy Smith
2.	"Serenade"	Nicholas Brodsky; Sammy Cahn

7-inch single (London Records 45-HL-U 8252, 1956, UK)
No.	Title	Writer(s)	Length
1.	"I'm a Fool"	Tommy Smith
2.	"My Heart Is Broken in Three"	Del Porter; Ray Glaser; Carl Hoefle

== 1967 version ==
"I'm a Fool"

Single by Slim Whitman

from the album 15th Anniversary Album
- A-side: "I'm a Fool" "North Wind"
- Released: 1967
- Recorded: 1967
- Genre: Country, western
- Length: 2:56
- Label: Imperial
- Songwriter(s): Tommy Smith

=== Track listing ===
7-inch single (Imperial 66268, United States)
No.	Title	Writer(s)	Length
1.	"I'm a Fool" (from the Imperial album 15th Anniversary — LP-9342)	Tommy Smith
2.	"North Wind" (from the Imperial album 15th Anniversary — LP-9342)	R. Morris

== Charts ==
Chart (1956)	Peak position
UK Singles (OCC)	16
Chart (1967)	Peak position
US Hot Country Songs (Billboard)	61
