= Mario Lanza in "Serenade" =

Soundtrack album by Mario Lanza
- Released: 1956
- Label: RCA Victor

Mario Lanza chronology
The Student Prince (1954)	Mario Lanza in "Serenade" (1956)	Seven Hills of Rome (1958)

Mario Lanza in "Serenade", or simply Serenade, is a soundtrack album by tenor Mario Lanza containing songs featured in the 1956 Warner Bros. film Serenade that he starred in. The album was released by RCA Victor in the same year, to coincide with the film's release.

== Release ==
The album was released on the RCA Victor record label in 1956 – to coincide with the release of the film.

The album was available on LP (cat. no. LM-1996).

There was also an EP version (two records in a gatefold cover, cat. no. ERB-70). It had a relatively short runtime, with only eight songs across its four sides.

== Reception ==
Professional ratings
Review scores
Source	Rating
Billboard	positive ("Spotlight" pick)

Serenade / A Cavalcade of Show Tunes (2004 CD)
Review scores
Source	Rating
AllMusic	4/5 stars

The album peaked at number 11 on Billboard's Best-Selling Popular Albums chart for two consecutive weeks in May–June 1956.

== Track listing ==
LP (RCA Victor LM 1996)

Side 1
No.	Title	Music	Length
1.	"Serenade"	Nicholas Brodszky
2.	"La danza"
3.	"Torna a Surriento"
4.	"O soave fanciulla"
5.	"Di rigori armato"
6.	"Di quella pira"
7.	"Amor ti vieta"
8.	"O paradiso"

Side 2
No.	Title	Music	Length
1.	"Dio ti giocondi"
2.	"Ave Maria"
3.	"Lamento di Federico"
4.	"Nessun dorma"
5.	"My Destiny"	Nicholas Brodszky

2 × 7-inch 45-rpm EP (RCA Victor ERB-70)

Side 1
No.	Title	Music	Note(s)	Length
1.	"Serenade"	Nicholas Brodszky
2.	"Nessun dorma"	Giacomo Puccini	Turandot: Act III
3.	"Ave Maria"	Franz Schubert

Side 2
No.	Title	Music	Note(s)	Length
1.	"Lamento di Federico"	Francesco Cilea	L'Arlesiana
2.	"Di quella pira"	Giuseppe Verdi	Il Trovatore: Act III
3.	"My Destiny"	Nicholas Brodszky

Side 3
No.	Title	Music	Note(s)	Length
1.	"Dio ti giocondi"	Giuseppe Verdi	Otello: Act III with Licia Albanese, soprano

Side 4
No.	Title	Music	Note(s)	Length
1.	"E son io l'innocenti"	Giuseppe Verdi	Otello: Act III with Licia Albanese, soprano

== Charts ==
Chart (1956)	Peak position
US Billboard Best Selling Popular Albums	11
