= Doretta Morrow =

American actress

- Born: Doretta Marano; January 27, 1927; Brooklyn, New York, U.S.
- Died: February 28, 1968 (aged 41); London, England
- Occupations: Stage and television actress
- Years active: 1949-1960
- Spouse(s): Fred A. Miller (19??-1955; divorced); Albert Hardman (19??)
- Children: 1

Doretta Morrow (January 27, 1927 – February 28, 1968) was an American actress, singer and dancer who appeared in stage and television productions during the 1940s and 1950s. She is best remembered for having created roles in the original productions of three successful Broadway musicals: Kitty Verdun in Where's Charley? (1948), Tuptim in The King and I (1951) and Marsinah in Kismet (1953). She co-starred in the 1952 Hollywood film Because You're Mine, as Mario Lanza's love interest. She appeared in several live television musicals. She retired from performance in 1960 at the age of 33.

== Life and career ==
=== Early years ===
Morrow was born Doretta Marano, the daughter of Victor and Dolores Marano, in the Bensonhurst section of Brooklyn, New York in 1927. Singer Vic Damone was her cousin. At the age of 2 she moved with her family to Venice, Italy, where she began studying piano and singing. In 1943 she and her family moved back to New York, and she entered New Utrecht High School, where she sang in the school's glee club. She did not speak English until she was a teenager.

In New York she studied singing with soprano Alice Zeppilli.

=== Stage ===
After completing high school, Morrow was cast in the musical Shooting Star in 1945 which opened in Boston but never made it to New York. In 1946 she made her Broadway debut as Gretchen in the revival of Victor Herbert's The Red Mill, replacing Ann Andre early in the show's run. A hit with the public, she played the role for a total of 17 months. In October 1948 she created the role of Kitty Verdun in the original production of Where's Charley?; notably introducing the song "My Darling, My Darling" (duet with Byron Palmer). She remained with the production through its September 1950 closing.

In March 1951 Morrow created the role of Tuptim in the original Broadway production of Rodgers and Hammerstein's The King and I, with Gertrude Lawrence and Yul Brynner. In the production she introduced the songs "I Have Dreamed" and "We Kiss in a Shadow"; both duets with Larry Douglas, as well as "My Lord And Master". She left the production in late 1951 to film her only Hollywood movie, Because You're Mine, in which she starred opposite Mario Lanza. In 1953 she returned to Broadway for the last time to create the role of Marsinah in the original cast of Kismet. She had previously appeared at the show's world premiere in Los Angeles with the Los Angeles Civic Light Opera (LACLO); a performance which notably introduced the song "Baubles, Bangles, & Beads" to the public. She also portrayed Marsinah in the original West End production of Kismet in 1955. In 1957 she portrayed the title role in the first national tour of the musical Fanny. Her final stage appearance was in 1959 in the original West End cast of Cole Porter's Aladdin in the role of The Princess. She retired in 1960.

=== Television ===
Morrow made her television debut in 1949 on The Ed Sullivan Show. She appeared on that show several more times through 1958. She sang as a guest performer on several other variety programs during the 1950s, including Cavalcade of Stars, The Voice of Firestone, Paul Whiteman's Goodyear Revue, The Arthur Murray Party, The Steve Allen Show and General Motors 50th Anniversary Show among others. For the Pulitzer Prize Playhouse show she appeared in a 1950 live television version of the Kurt Weill musical Knickerbocker Holiday in which she played Tina Tienhoven. She played Monique DuPont in a 1951 television version of the musical Miss Liberty for the Musical Comedy Time program, and performed the role of Polly Peachum in a 1952 television adaptation of The Beggar's Opera for CBS.

She also starred in the live television musical specials Once Upon an Eastertime (1954) and The Adventures of Marco Polo on Max Liebman Spectaculars (April 14, 1956). She made her last television appearance in a 1959 episode of The Further Adventures of Ellery Queen.

== Personal life ==
Morrow was married to Fred A. Miller, a cargo-airline executive. That marriage ended in divorce in 1955. Shortly after her withdrawal from the public eye, she married Albert Hardman, an Englishman who worked as an underwriter for Lloyd's of London. They had one child, a daughter.

== Death ==
On February 28, 1968, Morrow died in London, aged 41, from lymphoma. She was buried in Putney Vale Cemetery in London.

== Theater credits ==
- 1946 The Red Mill Broadway revival; portrayed the role of Gretchen
- 1948 Where's Charley? Broadway production. Morrow created the role of Kitty Verdun
- 1951 The King and I Broadway production. Morrow created the role of Tuptim
- 1953 Kismet Broadway production. Morrow created the role of Marsinah'
- 1955 Kismet London production
- 1957 Fanny American touring company production in the title role
- 1959 Aladdin London production of the Cole Porter musical in the role of The Princess

== Film credits ==
- 1952 Because You're Mine

== Television musical ==
- 14 April 1956: The Adventures of Marco Polo
