= Mario Lanza Sings Popular Songs from "The Toast of New Orleans" =

Studio album by Mario Lanza
- Released: 1950
- Recorded: June 27 and 29, 1950
- Studio: Republic Studios Sound Stage 9, Hollywood
- Label: RCA Victor

Mario Lanza chronology
Operatic Arias and Duets as Sung in "The Toast of New Orleans" (1950)	Mario Lanza Sings Popular Songs from "The Toast of New Orleans" (1950)	Mario Lanza Sings Selections from "The Great Caruso" (1951)

Mario Lanza Sings Popular Songs from the M-G-M Technicolor Motion Picture "The Toast of New Orleans", or simply The Toast of New Orleans, is an album by tenor Mario Lanza containing songs from the 1950 Metro-Goldwyn-Mayer film The Toast of New Orleans that featured him, Kathryn Grayson and David Niven.

The album was released by RCA Victor in late 1950. It was available on 78 rpm (a set of two records, cat. no. DM-1417) and 45 rpm (a set of two records, WDM-1417). The record containing the hit "Be My Love" (c/w "I'll Never Love You", cat. numbers 10-1561 and 49-1353) was not included in this album.

The album spent several weeks at number one on Billboard's Best-Selling Pop Albums chart – on the "Best-Selling 45 R.P.M." half of it.

== Recording ==
The album was recorded on June 27 and 29, 1950 at the Republic Studios Sound Stage 9 in Hollywood.

Mario Lanza had previously, on April 8 and 11, recorded another album containing songs from the same movie – released under the title Operatic Arias and Duets as Sung in "The Toast of New Orleans" (cat. numbers DM-1395 and WDM-1395). Unlike DM/WDM-1417, that other album contained classical (operatic) pieces.

== Track listing ==
Album of two 45-rpm EPs (RCA Victor WDM 1417)

All lyrics are written by Sammy Cahn; all music is composed by Nicholas Brodszky.

Side 1
No.	Title	Length
1.	"Toast of New Orleans"

Side 2
No.	Title	Length
1.	"Boom Biddy Boom"

Side 3
No.	Title	Length
1.	"Tina-Lina"

Side 4
No.	Title	Length
1.	"The Bayou Lullaby"

== Charts ==
Chart (1951)	Peak position
US Billboard Best Selling Popular Albums – Best Selling 45 R.P.M.	1
