= Guardian Angels (Harpo Marx song) =

"Guardian Angels" is a song by Harpo Marx and lyricist Gerda Beilenson (1903–1985), originally for the film The All-Star Bond Rally (1945). The lyrics begin with: "Guardian angels around my bed, joining me in my prayers". Beilenson's husband was the Marx Brothers’ lawyer, Larry Beilenson, who showed the song to Mario Lanza, who recorded it on his Christmas album Mario Lanza Sings Christmas Songs in 1951. It was recorded by Plácido Domingo for his My Christmas album for Sony in 2014.
