= Operatic Arias and Duets as Sung in "The Toast of New Orleans" =

Studio album by Mario Lanza
- Released: 1950
- Recorded: April 8 and 11, 1950
- Studio: Republic Studios Sound Stage 9, Hollywood
- Label: RCA Victor

Mario Lanza chronology
That Midnight Kiss (1949)	Operatic Arias and Duets as Sung in "The Toast of New Orleans" (1950)	Mario Lanza Sings Popular Songs from "The Toast of New Orleans" (1950)

Operatic Arias and Duets as Sung in "The Toast of New Orleans", or simply The Toast of New Orleans, is an album by tenor Mario Lanza containing operatic areas featured in the 1950 Metro-Goldwyn-Mayer film The Toast of New Orleans that he starred in.

The album was released by RCA Victor in 1950. It was available on 78 rpm (a set of three records, cat. no. DM-1395) and 45 rpm (a set of three records, WDM-1395).

The album spent numerous weeks at number one on Billboard's Best-Selling Classical Titles chart – on the "Best-Selling 45 R.P.M." half of it.

== Recording ==
The album was recorded on April 8 and 11, 1950 at the Republic Studios Sound Stage 9 in Hollywood.

Later, on June 27 and 29, Mario Lanza would also record an album of pop songs from the same movie – released under the title Mario Lanza Sings Popular Songs from "The Toast of New Orleans" (cat. numbers DM-1417 and WDM-1417).

== Track listing ==
A set of three 7-inch 45-rpm records (RCA Victor WDM-1395)

Side 1
No.	Title	Note(s)	Length
1.	"Libiamo, ne' lieti calici" ("Drinking Song: A Bumper We'll Drain")	Verdi. La Traviata: Act I Mario Lanza, tenor. Elaine Malbin, soprano

Side 2
No.	Title	Note(s)	Length
1.	"Love Duet: Stolta paura, l'amor" ("Fear Not, My Dearest, for Love") (Part 1)	Puccini. Madama Butterfly: Act I Mario Lanza, tenor. Elaine Malbin, soprano

Side 3
No.	Title	Note(s)	Length
1.	"Love Duet: Dicon ch'oltre mare" ("They Say That in Your Country") (Concluded)	Puccini. Madama Butterfly: Act I Mario Lanza, tenor. Elaine Malbin, soprano

Side 4
No.	Title	Note(s)	Length
1.	"O paradiso!" ("Oh Paradise!")	Meyerbeer. L'Africana: Act IV

Side 5
No.	Title	Note(s)	Length
1.	"La fleur que tu m'avais jetée" ("Flower Song")	Bizet. Carmen: Act II

Side 6
No.	Title	Note(s)	Length
1.	"M'appari" ("Like a Dream")	Flotow. Martha: Act III

== Charts ==
Chart (1950–1951)	Peak position
US Billboard Best Selling Classical Titles – Best Selling 45 R.P.M.	1
