= Encanto del Mar =

Studio album by Plácido Domingo
- Released: October 6, 2014
- Genre: Popular song, folk music
- Length: 50:37
- Label: Sony
- Producer: Robert Sadin

Plácido Domingo chronology
Verdi Baritone Arias (2013)	Encanto del Mar (2014)	My Christmas (2014)

Professional ratings
Review scores
Source	Rating
AllMusic	3.5/5 stars

Encanto del Mar is a 2014 album of Mediterranean songs by Plácido Domingo. Singing in the baritone range, Domingo performs songs from diverse countries and regions around the Mediterranean Sea in eleven different languages, typically with simple accompaniments.

== Track listing ==
1. "Mediterráneo" - Spanish
2. "Estate" (Bruno Martino and Bruno Brighetti) - Italian
3. "En Méditerranée" - French
4. "Aranjuez" - Spanish
5. "Anghjulina" - Corsican
6. "Torna a Surriento" - Neapolitan
7. "No potho reposare" - Sardinian
8. "Lamma bada" - Arabic (from Andalusia)
9. "Adio Kerida" - Ladino
10. "To Yasemi" - Greek (from Cyprus)
11. "Reginella" - Neapolitan
12. "Layla layla" - Hebrew
13. "El cant dels ocells" - Catalan
14. "Del Cabello Más Sutil" - Spanish
15. "Plaisir d'amour" - French (by Jean-Paul-Égide Martini (1741–1816))

== Chart performance ==
Chart (2014)	Peak position
Spain	24
US Latin Pop Albums	6
US Top Latin Albums	18

== Personnel ==
- Plácido Domingo - lead vocals
- Jelena Ciric - vocals
- Barbara Furtuna - vocals
- Cyro Baptista - percussion
- Ira Coleman - bass
- Hector del Curto - bandoneon
- Gjorgi Dimcevski - violin
- Mark Feldman - violin
- Yacine Boulares - soprano saxophone
- Bridget Kibbey - harp
- Rhani Krija - percussion
- Patrick Messina - clarinet
- Chico Pinheiro - guitar
- Mário Rossy - bass
- Vincent Segal - cello
