= Edna Savage =

English singer (1936–2000)

- Born: 21 April 1936; Warrington, Lancashire, England
- Died: 31 December 2000 (aged 64) Ormskirk, Lancashire, England
- Genre: Traditional pop
- Years active: 1954–1960
- Labels: Parlophone, Columbia (UK)

Edna Savage (21 April 1936 – 31 December 2000) was an English traditional pop singer.

Savage was born in Warrington, Lancashire, England. She had two elder sisters. Her father was a landscape gardener; her mother an amateur singer. She left school at 15. At first she trained as a telephone operator, but after a few bands had her sing for them locally, she quit the telephone job to sing professionally.

She auditioned twice for the BBC before making her first broadcast, in 1954. She recorded a number of records, only one of which charted, "Arrivederci Darling" in 1956, which made it to No. 19 in the UK Singles Chart. In 1957 she participated in the UK qualifying heat for the Eurovision Song Contest. In addition to being briefly married to fellow singer Terry Dene, Savage married three more times.

She died at the age of 64.

== Recordings ==
Data from:

Year	Title	Songwriters	Orchestra	Label and catalogue reference
1955	"I'll Be There"	Wayne	Ron Goodwin Orchestra	Parlophone R4017
1955	"Evermore"	Levine/Roberts	Ron Goodwin Orchestra	Parlophone R4017
1955	"Stars Shine in Your Eyes"	Rota/Parsons/Turner	Ron Goodwin Orchestra	Parlophone R4043
1955	"A Star is Born"	Roberts/Hennessy	Ron Goodwin Orchestra	Parlophone R4043
1955	"Candlelight"	Miller/Roberts/Trevor	Ron Goodwin Orchestra	Parlophone R4067
1955	"In the Wee Small Hours of the Morning"	Mann/Hilliard	Ron Goodwin Orchestra	Parlophone R4067
1955	"Arrivederci Darling"	Rascel/Fishman	Accompaniment directed by Peter Knight	Parlophone R4097
1955	"Bella Notte"	Lee/Burke	Accompaniment directed by Peter Knight	Parlophone R4097
1956	"Tell Me, Tell Me, Tell Me that You Love Me"	Goodwin/Sheridan	Ron Goodwin Orchestra	Parlophone R4139
1956	"Please Hurry Home"	Raleigh/Gaze	Ron Goodwin Orchestra	Parlophone R4139
1956	"My Prayer"	Kennedy/Boulanger	Accompaniment directed by Reg Owen	Parlophone R4226
1956	"Me 'n' You 'n' the Moon"	Cahn/Van Heusen	Accompaniment directed by Reg Owen	Parlophone R4226
1956	"A Tear Fell"	Randolph/Burton	Ron Goodwin Orchestra	Parlophone R4159
1956	"Something Old, Something New"	Bower/Woof	Ron Goodwin Orchestra	Parlophone R4159
1957	"Never Leave Me"	Jenkins	Ron Goodwin Orchestra	Parlophone R4253
1957	"Don't Ever Go (I Need You)"	Maxin	Ron Goodwin Orchestra	Parlophone R4253
1957	"Me Head's in de Barrel"	Hilliard/DeLugg	Ron Goodwin Orchestra	Parlophone R4301
1957	"Five Oranges, Four Apples"	Curtis	Ron Goodwin Orchestra	Parlophone R4301
1957	"Diano Marina"	Weedon/Innes	Reg Owen Orchestra	Parlophone R4360
1957	"Let Me Be Loved"	Livingston/Evans	Reg Owen Orchestra	Parlophone R4360
1958	"Near You"	Goell/Craig	Accompaniment directed by Bob Sharples	Parlophone R4489
1958	"Why, Why, Why"	Vidalin/Datin/Roberts	Accompaniment directed by Bob Sharples	Parlophone R4489
1958	"Once"	Barbara Killalee	Ron Goodwin Orchestra	Parlophone R4420
1958	"My Shining Star"	Masters/Olias	Ron Goodwin Orchestra	Parlophone R4420
1958	"Tiptoe Through the Tulips"	Burke/Dubin	Edwin Braden & his Orchestra with Michael Holliday	Columbia (UK) SEG 7836 (EP)
1958	"'S Wonderful"	Gershwin/Gershwin	Edwin Braden & his Orchestra with Michael Holliday	Columbia (UK) SEG 7836 (EP)
1958	"Tea for Two"	Youmans/Caesar	Edwin Braden & his Orchestra with Michael Holliday	Columbia (UK) SEG 7836 (EP)
1958	"Goodnight My Love"	Revel / Gordon	Edwin Braden & his Orchestra with Michael Holliday	Columbia (UK) SEG 7836 (EP)
1959	"Beautiful Love"	Gillespie/Young/King/van Alstyne	Accompaniment directed by Ron Goodwin	Parlophone R4572
1959	"Maybe This Year"	Stellman/Wakeley	Accompaniment directed by Ron Goodwin	Parlophone R4572
1960	"All I Need"	Stanford/Donahue	Accompaniment directed by Ron Goodwin	Parlophone R4648
1960	"Everyday"	Hardie/Petty *The record label was published with a typo: ' Hardie ' for ' Hardin ', (Buddy Holly)	Accompaniment directed by Ron Goodwin	Parlophone R4648
