= Because You're Mine =

1952 film by Alexander Hall

- Original film poster
- Directed by: Alexander Hall
- Screenplay by: Leonard Spigelgass; Karl Tunberg
- Story by: Ruth Brooks Flippen; Sy Gomberg
- Produced by: Joe Pasternak
- Starring: Mario Lanza; Doretta Morrow; James Whitmore; Bobby Van
- Cinematography: Joseph Ruttenberg
- Edited by: Albert Akst
- Music by: Johnny Green
- Color process: Technicolor
- Production company: Metro-Goldwyn-Mayer
- Distributed by: Metro-Goldwyn-Mayer
- Release date: September 25, 1952 (New York)
- Running time: 103 minutes
- Country: United States
- Language: English
- Budget: $1,870,000
- Box office: $4,571,000

Because You're Mine is a 1952 American musical comedy film directed by Alexander Hall and starring Mario Lanza, Doretta Morrow, James Whitmore and Bobby Van.

== Plot ==
Opera singer superstar Renaldo Rossano is drafted into the U.S. Army. His sergeant, "Bat" Batterson, is an opera fan who admires Rossano and wants him to appraise his sister Brigit's singing voice. The rest of the platoon, as well as the company commander, disapprove of Batterson's favoritism toward Rossano, whom he excuses from normal training.

Rossano schemes to have Batterson allow him to travel to New York, purportedly to have his manager hear Brigit sing, but in reality, Rossano wishes to perform on the stage. After realizing that he has been tricked, Batterson resolves to pose great difficulties for Rossano's military life. The two men brawl, sending them both to the brig and facing a court-martial. A United Nations delegation visiting the base insists that Rossano be freed in order to sing for them.

Rossano's mother settles his romantic problems with Bridget.

== Cast ==
- Mario Lanza as Renaldo Rossano
- Doretta Morrow as Bridget Batterson
- James Whitmore as Sergeant 'Bat' Batterson
- Dean Miller as Ben Jones
- Rita Corday as Francesca Landers (as Paula Corday)
- Jeff Donnell as Patty Ware
- Spring Byington as Mrs. Edna Montville
- Curtis Cooksey as General Louis Montville
- Don Porter as Captain Burton Nordell Loring
- Eduard Franz as Albert Parkson Foster
- Bobby Van as Artie Pilcer
- Ralph Reed as Horsey Jackson
- Celia Lovsky as Mrs. Rossano
- Alexander Steinert as Maestro Paradoni

== Production ==
Production was scheduled to begin in August 1951 but was delayed for several weeks. Newspapers reported conflicting reasons for the postponement, including the need for script revisions. The Los Angeles Times reported that Lanza had requested a two-week rigorous training regimen geared to reduce his weight to that of a typical soldier. Syndicated columnist Dorothy Manners wrote that Lanza, unhappy with the script, had refused to report for work and was demotivated by a sharply critical piece about him that had been published the August 6, 1951 issue of Time magazine. Several days later, MGM announced that production had been delayed until October as Lanza would spend the next six weeks on vacation, including training in Idaho to lose approximately 40 pounds. Some newspaper reports speculated that the film project might be shelved altogether.

Just before filming was to resume in late October 1951, the production was again delayed because Lanza reported feeling ill as a result of his strenuous diet. Various reports continued to predict that the production would be permanently abandoned unless Lanza's physicians could return him to a sufficient level of health, and MGM's enthusiastic promotion of singing actor Fernando Lamas was viewed as a threat to Lanza's future with the studio. Production finally began on December 10 and wrapped by mid-February 1952. Lanza's fluctuations in weight necessitated the reshooting of several scenes.

== Music ==
The title song, "Because You're Mine", earned an Academy Award nomination for Best Original Song. Written by Sammy Cahn and Nicholas Brodszky, it became Lanza's third and final million-selling single.

Musical highlights in the film include "Granada", "The Lord's Prayer" and the duet "Addio, addio" from Rigoletto. "The Song Angels Sing" is a passage from Johannes Brahms' Third Symphony with new English lyrics.

== Release ==
The world premiere of Because You're Mine was held at Radio City Music Hall in New York on September 25, 1952.

== Reception ==
In a contemporary review for The New York Times, critic Bosley Crowther wrote: "It is not that Mr. Lanza's delivery or the gags are really poor or the story in which they cozily nestle is in any way hard to take. It is just that the lot of them—the story, the gags and Mr. Lanza's aplomb in playing what is supposed to be funny—are a little bit obvious and banal. ... But it is really Mr. Lanza's singing of a trio of new popular songs ... that should—and will—attract attention to this Technicolored film."

According to MGM records, the film earned $2,267,000 in the U.S. and Canada and $2,304,000 elsewhere, resulting in a profit of $735,000. It became the fifth-most-popular film at the British box office in 1953 and was chosen for the inaugural Royal Command Film Performance of Queen Elizabeth II's reign.
