= My Christmas (Plácido Domingo album) =

Studio album by Plácido Domingo
- Released: 2014
- Genre: Christmas

Plácido Domingo chronology
Encanto del Mar (2014)	My Christmas (2014)	Volver (2018)

My Christmas is a 2014 album by Plácido Domingo for Sony Classical, featuring also Helene Fischer, The Piano Guys, Plácido Domingo Jr., Czech National Symphony Choir, Czech National Symphony Orchestra, conducted by Eugene Kohn.

== Track listing ==
1. "Have Yourself A Merry Little Christmas" with Vincent Niclo
2. "Guardian Angels" with Idina Menzel - written by Harpo Marx
3. "Silent Night" with The Piano Guys
4. "What Child Is This" with Helene Fischer
5. "God Rest Ye Merry, Gentlemen" with The Voices Of Los Angeles Opera's Domingo-Colburn-Stein Young Artist Program
6. "Hark! The Herald Angels Sing"
7. "Andrew Lloyd Webber: setting of the Pie Jesu from Requiem with Jackie Evancho
8. "Astro del ciel", version of Silent Night by Franz X. Gruber
9. "Loving Christmas with You" with Hayley Westenra, written by Plácido Domingo Jr.
10. "It Came Upon The Midnight Clear"
11. "White Christmas" with Plácido Domingo Jr.
12. Mozart: Ave verum corpus KV 618
13. "Feliz Navidad" with Banda El Recodo
