= Mario Lanza Sings Christmas Songs =

Studio album by Mario Lanza
- Released: late 1951
- Label: RCA Victor

Mario Lanza chronology
Mario Lanza Sings Selections from "The Great Caruso" (1951)	Mario Lanza Sings Christmas Songs (1951)	Mario Lanza Sings Songs from M-G-M's Technicolor Motion Picture "Because You're Mine" (1952)

Mario Lanza Sings Christmas Songs is an album by tenor Mario Lanza released by RCA Victor in late 1951.

It was available on 78 rpm (cat. no. DM-1649), 45 rpm (WDM-1649) and 33⅓ rpm (LM-155).

The album spent several weeks at number one on Billboard's Best-Selling Pop Albums chart – on both the 33⅓-rpm and 45-rpm halves of it.

== Track listing ==
10-inch LP (RCA Victor LM-155)

Side 1
No.	Title	Lyrics	Music	Length
1.	"The Lord's Prayer"		Malotte
2.	"The First Noel"		French traditional
3.	"O Come, All Ye Faithful" ("Adeste fideles")	Oakeley	Portuguese
4.	"Away in a Manger" ("Luther's Cradle Hymn")		Luther

Side 2
No.	Title	Lyrics	Music	Length
1.	"We Three Kings of Orient Are"		Hopkins
2.	"Oh Little Town of Bethlehem"	Brooks	Redner
3.	"Silent Night"	Mohr	Gruber
4.	"Guardian Angels"	Gerda	Harpo Marx

== Charts ==
Chart (1951–1952)	Peak position
US Billboard Best Selling Pop Albums – Best Selling 33⅓ R.P.M.	1
US Billboard Best Selling Pop Albums – Best Selling 45 R.P.M.	1
