= South Pacific (original Broadway cast recording) =

Cast recording by Mary Martin, Ezio Pinza with the original Broadway cast
- Released: May 9, 1949
- Recorded: April 18–19, 1949
- Studio: 30th Street Studio
- Genre: Show tunes
- Label: Columbia Masterworks

South Pacific, credited to Mary Martin and Ezio Pinza with the original Broadway cast, is the album containing the original studio cast recording of the 1949 musical South Pacific. It was released by Columbia in the same year, on May 9.

The album was released as a set of seven 10-inch 78-rpm phonograph records (cat. no. MM-850). It was also made available on LP (cat. no. ML-4180). According to The Complete Book of 1940s Broadway Musicals, that was the "first Broadway musical issued on the new LP format".

== Recording ==
The album was recorded in Columbia's 30th Street Studio on April 18 and 19, 1949.

== Reception ==
The album spent a total of 69 weeks at number one on Billboard's popular albums chart.^{[A]}

== Legacy ==
The album was added to the National Recording Registry as being "culturally or historically significant".

== Track listing ==
12" LP (Columbia Masterworks ML 4180)

Side 1
| No. | Title | Artist(s) | Length |
|---|---|---|---|
| 1. | "Overture" |
| 2. | "Dites Moi" | Barbara Luna |
| 3. | "A Cock-eyed Optimist" | Mary Martin |
| 4. | "Twin Soliloquies" ("Wonder how it feels") | Ezio Pinza, Mary Martin |
| 5. | "Some Enchanted Evening" | Ezio Pinza |
| 6. | "Bloody Mary" | Men's Chorus |
| 7. | "There Is Nothin' like a Dame" | Men's Chorus |
| 8. | "Bali Ha'i" | Juanita Hall |

Side 2
| No. | Title | Artist(s) | Length |
|---|---|---|---|
| 1. | "I'm Gonna Wash That Man Right Outa My Hair" | Mary Martin and Girls' Chorus |
| 2. | "A Wonderful Guy" | Mary Martin and Girls' Chorus |
| 3. | "Younger than Springtime" | William Tabbert |
| 4. | "Happy Talk" | Juanita Hall |
| 5. | "Honey Bun" | Mary Martin |
| 6. | "Carefully Taught" | William Tabbert |
| 7. | "This Nearly Was Mine" | Ezio Pinza |
| 8. | "Finale" | Mary Martin, Ezio Pinza, with Barbara Luna |

== Charts ==
| Chart (1949–1951) | Peak position |
|---|---|
| US Billboard Best-Selling Popular Record Albums US Billboard Best Selling Pop Albums (from July 22, 1950, onwards) | 1 |

== Certifications ==
| Region | Certification | Certified units/sales |
|---|---|---|
| United States (RIAA) | Gold | 2,000,000 |

== Notes ==
1. ^A – In 1950, Billboard split its "Best-Selling Popular Record Albums" chart into two: one for 33⅓-rpm albums and one for 45-rpm albums. So that is 69 weeks for the "Best-Selling Popular Record Albums" and "Best Selling Pop Albums – Best Selling 33⅓ R.P.M." charts combined.
