= Homer Lamar Samuels =

American politician (1889-?)

Homer Lamar Samuels (September 26, 1889 – ?) was a Mississippi politician who served in the Mississippi Senate between 1960–1964.

In 1961, Samuels was contacted by Tom Scarborough of the Mississippi State Sovereignty Commission in regards to an investigation.
