= We Are Serenades =

Swedish musical group

- Origin: Stockholm, Sweden
- Years active: 2010 - Present
- Labels: Cherrytree, Interscope
- Members: Adam Olenius; Markus Krunegård
- Website: www.weareserenades.com

We Are Serenades is a music group from Stockholm, Sweden signed to Cherrytree. The group is made up of Adam Olenius and Markus Krunegård.

== Biographies ==
Adam Olenius started his musical career with his band Shout Out Louds. Markus Krunegård began his musical career with his band Laakso. The two talk about how their relationship began in between touring, and wrote songs over the phone. In winter of 2010/2011, Olenius and Krunegård started recording in the studio for two months, and then released their album “Criminal Heaven” under the group name We Are Serenades.

== Discography ==
The debut album “Criminal Heaven” consists of 10 songs, including the international singles “Come Home”, “Birds”, and “Oceans”. Many songs on the record have to do with the changing of the seasons and “a common infatuation with nature”, stemming from both Olenius and Krunegård’s upbringing in northern Finland and Sweden. The album will be available in the US on April 17, 2012.

The group was signed to punk/new wave label Stranded (Sweden) and have since been picked up for a worldwide record deal with Cherrytree Records/Interscope.
