= The Toast of New Orleans =

1950 film by Norman Taurog

- Theatrical release poster
- Directed by: Norman Taurog
- Written by: Sy Gomberg; George Wells
- Produced by: Joe Pasternak
- Starring: Mario Lanza; Kathryn Grayson; David Niven
- Cinematography: William Snyder
- Edited by: Gene Ruggiero
- Music by: Nicholas Brodszky; Johnny Green
- Production company: Metro Goldwyn Mayer
- Distributed by: Loew's Inc.
- Release date: September 19, 1950 (New Orleans)
- Running time: 97 minutes
- Country: United States
- Language: English
- Budget: $1,889,000
- Box office: $3,251,000

The Toast of New Orleans is a 1950 MGM musical film directed by Norman Taurog, choreographed by Eugene Loring and starring Mario Lanza, Kathryn Grayson and David Niven.

== Plot ==
In 1905 Louisiana, Pepe Abellard Duvalle, a bayou fisherman with a natural singing talent, falls in love with Suzette Micheline, an opera soprano singer. Micheline's manager hears Duvalle sing and invites him to sing in New Orleans. Duvalle reluctantly allows himself to be groomed for the opera. At first resistant to his advances, Micheline also falls in love with Duvalle, but she is disenchanted by his transformation into a cultured gentleman. Duvalle ultimately regains his former rough charm and unites with Micheline.

== Cast ==
- Kathryn Grayson as Suzette Micheline
- Mario Lanza as Pepe Abellard Duvalle
- David Niven as Jacques Riboudeaux
- J. Carrol Naish as Nicky Duvalle
- James Mitchell as Pierre
- Richard Hageman as Maestro P. Trellini
- Clinton Sundberg as Oscar
- Sig Arno as Mayor
- Rita Moreno as Tina
- Romo Vincent as Manuelo

== Music ==
In addition to selected arias from the operas Carmen, Madama Butterfly and La traviata, the film includes the song "Be My Love", which was nominated for an Academy Award.

Music from the film was featured on the albums Operatic Arias and Duets as Sung in "The Toast of New Orleans" and Mario Lanza Sings Popular Songs from "The Toast of New Orleans".

== Production ==
Grayson and Lanza were first paired in the successful That Midnight Kiss (1949).

Filming began in late December 1949 and concluded in early March 1950. A total of 35 sets were required, and three adjoining sound stages on the MGM lot were combined to house one of the largest indoor sets constructed for a film musical.

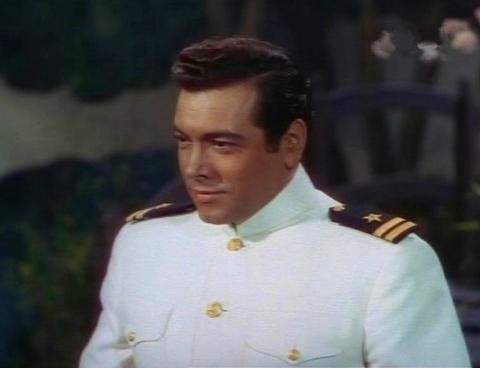
Lanza's character Pepe as Lt. Pinkerton in a recreation of the opera Madama Butterfly

The climactic scenes feature Lanza's and Grayson's characters performing in a production of Madama Butterfly. Lanza had debuted on the operatic stage in the role of B.F. Pinkerton in 1948.

Lanza earned $50,000 for his appearance in the film, twice what his contract had provided. The Toast of New Orleans also marked Hageman's acting debut and was Moreno's first role in a film musical.

== Release ==
Distributed by Loew's, The Toast of New Orleans premiered at the Loew's State in New Orleans on September 19, 1950, and it was released nationally on September 29.

== Reception ==
In a contemporary review for The New York Times, critic Thomas M. Pryor wrote:

Following the musical trail which it blazed some years ago with Jeanette MacDonald and Nelson Eddy, Metro-Goldwyn-Mayer now has gone a step further in the slow process of bringing grand opera to the screen in "The Toast of New Orleans," which co-stars Kathryn Grayson and Mario Lanza. Both these young people possess excellent singing voices and besides they have fresh, youthful personalities and sufficient acting ability to carry off a romantic tale with tolerable interest and conviction. "The Toast of New Orleans" ... is a case where the sound track is triumphant, for the comedy-romance follows a formula that is devoid of novelty or sparkle. But it is amazing how bright a picture can be spun from tarnished words and situations when the physical qualities of the production, the photography and the sets really enhance the atmosphere of the story.

According to MGM records, the film earned $1,671,000 in the U.S. and Canada and $1,580,000 elsewhere, leading to a profit of $22,000.
