= Serenade for Strings =

Serenade for Strings may refer to:

- Serenade for Strings (Dvořák) (in E major)
- Serenade for Strings (Elgar) (in E minor)
- Serenade for Strings (Kalinnikov) (in G minor)
- Serenade for Strings (Suk) (in E-flat major)
- Serenade for Strings (Tchaikovsky) (in C major)
