= Show Boat (soundtrack) =

Soundtrack album by various artists
- Released: 1951
- Label: MGM

Professional ratings
Review scores
Source	Rating
AllMusic	(1995 TCM/Rhino CD reissue)

The original soundtrack to the 1951 Metro-Goldwyn-Mayer film Show Boat was released by MGM Records.

The album was released as a 10-inch LP (cat. no. E-559), a set of four 10-inch 78-rpm phonograph records (cat. no. 84) and as a set of four 7-inch 45-rpm records (cat. no. K84).

The album peaked at number 1 on Billboard's Best Selling Pop Albums chart (on both the 33⅓-rpm and 45-rpm halves of it).

== Track listing ==
10-inch LP (MGM Records E-559)

Side 1
No.	Title	Artist(s)	Length
1.	"Make Believe"	Kathryn Grayson and Howard Keel
2.	"Bill"	Ava Gardner
3.	"Life upon the Wicked Stage"	Marge and Gower Champion
4.	"You Are Love"	Kathryn Grayson and Howard Keel

Side 2
No.	Title	Artist(s)	Length
1.	"Can't Help Lovin' Dat Man"	Ava Gardner (Annette Warren singing for Ms. Gardner)
2.	"I Might Fall Back on You"	Marge and Gower Champion
3.	"Why Do I Love You"	Kathryn Grayson and Howard Keel
4.	"Ol' Man River"	William Warfield

== Charts ==
Chart (1951)	Peak position
US Billboard Best Selling Pop Albums – Best Selling 33⅓ R.P.M.	1
US Billboard Best Selling Pop Albums – Best Selling 45 R.P.M.	1
