= La serenata =

Opera by Ruperto Chapí (1881)

- Opera by Ruperto Chapí
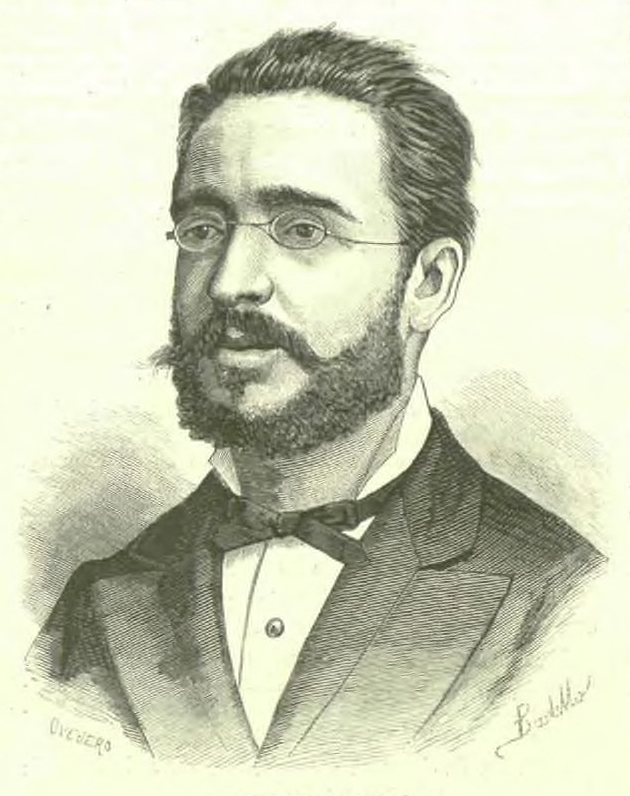
- Ruperto Chapí, from La Ilustración Española y Americana, 1878
- Translation: The Serenade
- Librettist: José Estremera
- Language: Spanish
- Based on: Eugène Scribe's La Xacarilla
- Premiere: 5 November 1881; Teatro Apolo, Madrid

La serenata (The Serenade) is a one-act opera by Ruperto Chapí to a libretto by José Estremera. It was first performed on 5 November 1881 at the Teatro Apolo in Madrid.

== Background and performance history ==
The libretto for La serenata was written in verse by José Estremera, a constant collaborator of Chapí, with whom he successfully staged the Música clásica the previous year (1880). The story is based on a play by Eugène Scribe, La Xacarilla (1839). The opera is a result of a new attempt to create a full-composed national opera in Spain, to end the prevalence of zarzuela present at that moment. It is composed in a Rossinian style, reminding also of works by Paisiello and Cimarosa.

The genre of the composition presented a difficulty. Chapí himself acknowledged its modest character. He explained the problem thus. La serenata doesn't contain mighty passions, as was usual for a serious opera. It also couldn't be called a comic opera, because an opéra comique is the French analogue of Spanish zarzuela. Estremera's subtitle was operetta (as printed in the libretto), an inappropriate label, because an operetta has to contain spoken parts, which are not present here. It could be named a lyric comedy (comedia lírica), but this title was used by Verdi for his grandiose Falstaff.

La serenata was performed on 5 November at the season opening of the Teatro Apolo. It formed the second part of that night, while the first one consisted of the overture to Chapí's Roger de Flor (1878) and an opera ¡Tierra! by Antonio Llanos (1873). The orchestra was conducted by Chapí. It was praised by the press, but didn't gain much success. After its failure Chapí rejected his attempts in the opera genre dedicating himself to zarzuelas foe many years.

La serenata was performed at the Teatro de Zarzuela together with the 2-act Marina. After Chapí was engaged by the Teatro Eslava, he arranged the score for smaller orchestral forces.

== Roles ==
Roles, voice types, premiere cast
Role	Voice type	Premiere cast, 5 November 1881
Rita	soprano	Matilde Rodríguez
Ventura	tenor	Cándio
Camacho		Arámbarri
The Corregidor	bass	Salvá
Two alguaciles	silent	
Chorus: contrabandists (male) and people (mixed)

== Synopsis ==
The opera is set in Cádiz and is in two tableaux.

The first tableau presents a view of the harbour with the house of Camacho on the foreground. The opening chorus of passengers thanks the corregidor for ending their quarantine: now they can proceed to the town. A young man Ventura is also on this ship, and is given a pass. The crowd disperses, leaving him alone to tell his story: he went to the sea to find glory and riches, but met only storms and pirates. Now he comes back, without a penny, and looks forward to seeing his beloved one. The night approaches. Some muffled persons appear and sing a mysterious serenade about a hunter trying in vain to catch an eagl. The door of the neighbour house opens, and they go in. Ventura tries to fall asleep on a stone bench, but another company steps in and the situation repeats. Tortured by hunger, he decides to sing this song too. The host of the house, Camacho, appears and leads him inwards.

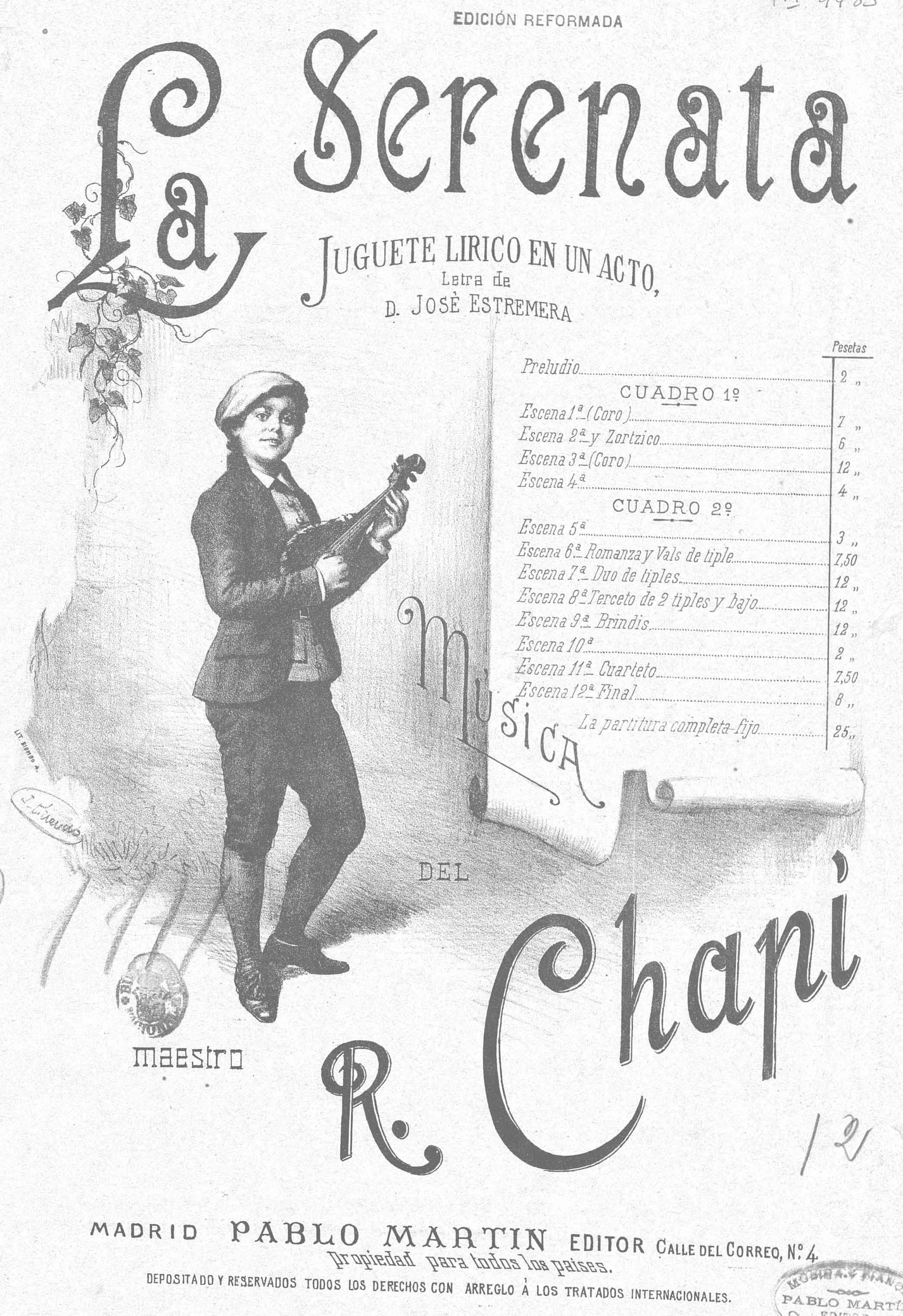
Cover page of the vocal score published by Parlo Martín (ca.1896)

In the second tableau the action takes place in a room inside of Camacho's house. The host tells his daughter Rita that tomorrow she will marry the corregidor, who adores her. She refuses this, as she promised to wait her beloved sailor. Camacho has much to do and does not continue the conversation. When he leaves, Rita sings of her sufferings and wishes the lover were here. Straight after this enters Ventura, who is actually the one she loves. They are full of joy to see each other. Suddenly Camacho comes in. He is about to beat Ventura, but the young man takes a guitar and sings the serenade. Camacho apologizes and gives him a burse of money. Ventura is astonished with such a change of his fortune and suggests to count the money. Instead, Camacho gives him another burse, apparently because he had cheated with the distribution of it. Before he sends Rita away, she appoints Ventura a date at ten sharp.

The room gets filled by the chorus of contrabandists praising the night and valour. During the farewell dinner Camacho recommends Ventura to his friends as a captain of a ship that will take them away from Cádiz and the corregidor, this night at ten sharp. Somebody asks Ventura to make a toast, and he sings two couplets about enjoying the delights of life. The chorus catches up his words. After this, the serenade is heard from the outside. Everybody rises intending to go to the boat, and Ventura manages to hide in an adjoint room. A man knocks at the door. It is corregidor: Camacho invited him to give information about the contrabandists. The chorus leaves through a secret door, and the host presents the corregidor with a document. The magistrate triumphs believing he will catch the contradandists now. Camacho's plan worked out well: while his friends are already safe in the sea, he is clear of any suspicion.

The clock strikes ten, and Ventura comes out of another room. The corregidor asks who is it, Camacho answers he had never seen him before. Ventura hopes to relief himself from this situation with the serenade, that used to help him already twice. But this time it turns a disaster: the corregidor recognizes the contrabandists' signal and orders two alguaciles to bring some soldiers to take Ventura to the prison. The latter understands nothing, but after the corregidor tells him about the contradandists, he shows the pass given to him by the same magistrate some hours before. The soldiers come with a crowd of people. Ventura forces Camacho to tell everyone he is Rita's fiancé, threatening him with the story of this night he is able to tell the corregidor. The magistrate resigns himself from the girl and puts the hands of the young together.

== Instrumentation ==
Woodwinds

- piccolo
- 2 flutes
- 2 oboes
- 2 clarinets (in B♭)
- 2 bassoons

Brass

- 2 cornets (in B♭)
- 2 trumpets (in F)
- 3 trombones

Percussion

- timpani
- snare drum
- triangle
- bass drum
- cymbals

Strings

- violins
- violas
- cellos
- basses

== Music ==
The opera consists of a prelude and 12 scenes. The notable music numbers are the prelude, the zortziko of Ventura (scene 2), the chorus's serenade (scene 3), the two-partite air (romance and waltz) sung by Rita (scene 6), and the trio (scene 8).

- Preludio
- Tableau 1:
  - Scene 1: Chorus (mixed chorus, with Ventura, the corregidor)
  - Scene 2: and zortziko (Ventura)
  - Scene 3: Chorus (male chorus, with Ventura, Camacho)
  - Scene 4: (Ventura, Camacho)
- Tableau 2:
  - Scene 5: (Rita, Camacho)
  - Scene 6: Romance and waltz (Rita)
  - Scene 7: Duo (Rita, Ventura)
  - Scene 8: Trio (Rita, Ventura, Camacho)
  - Scene 9: Drinking song (Ventura, Camacho, male chorus)
  - Scene 10: (Camacho, the corregidor)
  - Scene 11: Quartet (Rita, Ventura, the corregidor, Camacho)
  - Scene 12: Finale (Rita, Ventura, the corregidor, Camacho, mixed chorus)
