= Mario Lanza Sings Selections from "The Great Caruso" =

- 1960s-1980's reissue cover

Studio album by Mario Lanza
- Released: 1951
- Label: RCA Victor

Mario Lanza chronology
| Mario Lanza Sings Popular Songs from the MGM Technicolor Motion Picture "The Toast of New Orleans" (1950) | Mario Lanza Sings Selections from "The Great Caruso" (1951) | Mario Lanza Sings Christmas Songs (1951) |

Mario Lanza Sings Selections from "The Great Caruso", or simply The Great Caruso, is an album by tenor Mario Lanza containing eight opera arias, four of which were heard in the 1951 Metro-Goldwyn-Mayer film The Great Caruso, starring Lanza in the title role of Enrico Caruso. The album was recorded by RCA Victor in May 1950 and issued in 1951, shortly before the release of the film.

The Great Caruso album was issued in several formats including an album of four 12-inch 78-rpm records (catalog no. DM-1506), a set of four 7-inch 45-rpm records (WDM-1506) and as a 12-inch 33 1/3-rpm LP record (LM-1127). In 1963, The Great Caruso was reissued in reprocessed stereo sound (LSC-1127(e)). The album was reissued in 1982 under a revised catalog number (ARL1-4405(e)). In 1989, RCA Victor reissued the album on compact disc coupled with the 1960 album Mario Lanza Sings Caruso Favorites (60049-2-RG)

The album spent several weeks at number 1 on Billboard's Best Selling Pop Albums chart (on both the 33⅓-rpm and 45-rpm parts of the chart).

== Track listing ==
Album of four 78-rpm records (RCA Victor DM-1506)

Sides 1–2
| No. | Title | Composer. Work | Length |
|---|---|---|---|
| 1. | "Questa o quella" ("The One Is as Fair as the Other") | Verdi. Rigoletto: Act I |
| 2. | "La donna ė mobile" ("Woman Is Fickle") | Verdi. Rigoletto: Act IV |

Sides 3–4
| No. | Title | Composer. Work | Length |
|---|---|---|---|
| 1. | "Parmi veder le lagrime" ("Art Thou Weeping?") | Verdi. Rigoletto: Act II |
| 2. | "Recondita armonia" ("Strange Harmony of Contrasts") | Puccini. La Tosca: Act I |

Sides 5–6
| No. | Title | Composer. Work | Length |
|---|---|---|---|
| 1. | "E lucevan le stelle" ("The Stars Were Brightly Shining") | Puccini. La Tosca: Act III |
| 2. | "Una furtiva lagrima" ("A Furtive Tear") | Donizetti. L'elisir d'amore: Act II |

Sides 7–8
| No. | Title | Composer. Work | Length |
|---|---|---|---|
| 1. | "Cielo e mar!" ("Heaven and Ocean") | Ponchielli. La Gioconda: Act II |
| 2. | "Vesti la giubba" ("On with the Play") | Leoncavallo. Pagliacci: Act II |

== Charts ==
| Chart (1951) | Peak position |
|---|---|
| US Billboard Best Selling Pop Albums – Best Selling 33⅓ R.P.M. | 1 |
| US Billboard Best Selling Pop Albums – Best Selling 45 R.P.M. | 1 |

== Certifications ==
| Region | Certification | Certified units/sales |
|---|---|---|
| United States (RIAA) | Gold | 500,000^{^} |
^{^} Shipments figures based on certification alone.
