= That Midnight Kiss (album) =

Studio album by Mario Lanza
- Released: 1949
- Label: RCA Victor

Mario Lanza chronology
| That Midnight Kiss (1949) | Operatic Arias and Duets as Sung in "The Toast of New Orleans" (1950) |

That Midnight Kiss is an album by tenor Mario Lanza containing songs featured in the 1949 Metro-Goldwyn-Mayer film That Midnight Kiss – his screen debut.

The album was released by RCA Victor in 1949. It was available on 78 rpm (a set of three records, cat. no. DM-1330) and 45 rpm (a set of three records, WDM-1330) and on a 10" LP (LM-86).

== Content ==
The album contained four classical tracks and two contemporary pop songs.

== Recording ==
The pop songs "I Know, I Know, I Know" and "They Didn't Believe Me" were recorded on May 5, 1949, at the Republic Studios Sound Stage 9 in Hollywood. All the other (classical) songs were recorded on August 23, 1949, at Manhattan Center in New York.

== Release ==
The album's release was planned to coincide with the release of the film, but Metro-Goldwyn-Mayer advanced the film's release one month. But that time, the album's paperwork wasn't ready yet, but the records were already printed, so RCA made the decision to "temporarily forget the album" and start selling the individual records it contained (the "singles") as soon as possible.

== Reception ==
The album spent two consecutive weeks at number three on Billboard's Pop Albums chart in November 1949.

== Track listing ==
A set of three 12-inch 78-rpm records (RCA Victor DM-1330)

12-1025-A
| No. | Title | Music | Note(s) | Length |
|---|---|---|---|---|
| 1. | "Che gelida manina" ("Your Tiny Hand Is Frozen") | Puccini | La boheme: Act I |

12-1025-B
| No. | Title | Music | Note(s) | Length |
|---|---|---|---|---|
| 1. | "Celeste Aida" ("Heavenly Aida") | Verdi | Aida: Act I |

12-1026-A
| No. | Title | Lyrics | Music | Length |
|---|---|---|---|---|
| 1. | "Mamma mia che vo' sape?" ("What My Mother Wants to Know") | F. Russo | Nutile |

12-1026-B
| No. | Title | Lyrics | Music | Length |
|---|---|---|---|---|
| 1. | "Core 'ngrato" ("Ungrateful Heart") | Ricardo Cordiferro | Cardillo |

12-1027-A
| No. | Title | Lyrics | Music | Note(s) | Length |
|---|---|---|---|---|---|
| 1. | "I Know, I Know, I Know" | Bob Russell | Bronislau Kaper | From the M-G-M film "That Midnight Kiss" |

12-1027-B
| No. | Title | Lyrics | Music | Note(s) | Length |
|---|---|---|---|---|---|
| 1. | "They Didn't Believe Me" | M. E. Rourk | Kern | From "The Girl from Utah" |

== Charts ==
| Chart (1949–1950) | Peak position |
|---|---|
| US Billboard Pop Albums | 3 |
| US Billboard Classical Albums | 3 |
| US Billboard Best Selling 45 RPM Classical Titles | 1 |
