= Be My Love =

Single by Mario Lanza
- B-side: "I'll Never Love You"
- Released: 1950
- Recorded: 1950
- Genre: Traditional pop
- Length: 3:29
- Label: RCA Victor Red Seal
- Composer: Nicholas Brodszky
- Lyricist: Sammy Cahn

Mario Lanza singles chronology
"Toast of New Orleans" (1950)	"Be My Love" (1950)	"Granada" (1950)

"Be My Love" is a song with lyrics by Sammy Cahn and music by Nicholas Brodszky. Published in 1950, it was written for Mario Lanza, who sang it with Kathryn Grayson in the 1950 movie The Toast of New Orleans. The song was nominated for the Academy Award for Best Original Song in 1950 but lost to "Mona Lisa". Lanza recorded it on June 27, 1950, with Ray Sinatra's orchestra.

Lanza's 1950 RCA Victor recording of the song was his first gold record, eventually selling over two million copies. The song reached number one on the Billboard chart, where it spent a total of 34 weeks. "Be My Love" was the theme song for Lanza's NBC radio program, The Mario Lanza Show (1951–52). "Be My Love" became so closely associated with Lanza that he grew tired of the song and resorted to spoofing it in private.

== Other versions ==
- Ray Anthony's rendition of "Be My Love" (Capitol F1352) also charted in 1951, peaking at No. 13.
- Connie Francis recorded "Be My Love" in 1964 for her motion picture Looking For Love and for the subsequent soundtrack album.
- Mel Carter released a version in 1967 which reached #23 in the Adult Contemporary category.
- Tatsurō Yamashita recorded it for his 1993 album, Season's Greetings.
- Cheryl Bentyne recorded it for her 2006 album, The Book of Love.
- Jo Min-gyu of Forestella auditioned for the survival show Phantom Singer with "Be My Love" and later recorded a studio version as a B-side for his 2020 single album Shinsegae: New Age. This version was also included in his 2021 EP Shinsegae: Parana.
