= For the First Time (1959 film) =

- Directed by: Rudolph Maté
- Written by: Andrew Solt
- Produced by: Paul Baron; Alexander Grüter; Max Koslowski; Alfredo Panone; Georg von Block
- Starring: Mario Lanza; Johanna von Koczian; Zsa Zsa Gabor
- Cinematography: Aldo Tonti
- Edited by: Gene Ruggiero
- Music by: George Stoll
- Production companies: Corona Filmproduktion; Orion Films; Titanus
- Distributed by: Metro-Goldwyn-Mayer; Constantin Film
- Release date: 26 August 1959
- Running time: 92 minutes
- Countries: Italy; United States; West Germany
- Language: English
- Budget: $500,000
- Box office: $1,685,000

For the First Time (German title: Serenade of a Great Love) is a 1959 musical film directed by Rudolph Maté and starring Mario Lanza, Johanna von Koczian, Kurt Kasznar, and Zsa Zsa Gabor. It was tenor star Mario Lanza's final film, released by Metro-Goldwyn-Mayer six weeks before his death. Lanza stars as an operatic tenor who finds love for the first time with a young German woman (played by Johanna von Koczian), who happens to be deaf.

The film was shot at the Spandau Studios in Berlin and on location in 1958 in Capri, Salzburg, Berlin and at the Rome Opera House. The film's sets were designed by the art directors Hans Jürgen Kiebach, Fritz Maurischat and Heinrich Weidemann.

== Plot ==
Tony Costa is a world famous opera singer with a reputation for playboy antics and irresponsibilty. His loyal manager Tabory is constantly ingesting nervous stomach medication. After a scandalous no-show at the Vienna Opera, Tabory ships Tony off to Capri to hide out from the press.

Tony is showing off his voice to a gaggle of girls in the town square when he notices one woman absorbed in a book who isn't paying him any attention at all. His curiosity aroused, Tony follows her home. Christa is a normal young woman who had been deafened in a World War Two bombing raid, and has shied away from men because she considers herself unattractive due to her handicap.

Tony sneaks back to New York and his manager, saying he wants bookings in every city that has the best ear doctors in the world. Tabory breaks the news that Tony is broke and will have to start his whole career over from scratch the right way. Tony accomplishes this. But the only ear doctor who holds out any hope for Christa warns that the operation is potentially life threatening. Christa insists on going through with it.

The operation is a success, and an exuberant Tony takes her and her family on a global tour of celebration. The strain (and being caught in a thunderstorm) brings on a temporary relapse for Christa. Tony takes out his frustration in a nightclub brawl that is hastily covered up by his friends who are aware of the circumstances.

Christa's hearing is restored with rest and care, and Tony resumes his career with renewed vigor.

== Cast ==
- Mario Lanza as Tonio Costa
- Johanna von Koczian as Christa
- Kurt Kasznar as Tabory
- Zsa Zsa Gabor as Gloria De Vadnuz
- Hans Söhnker as Prof. Bruckner
- Annie Rosar as Mathilde Faktotum
- Sandro Giglio as Alessandro
- Walter Rilla as Dr. Bessart
- Renzo Cesana as Angelo
- Peter Capell as Leopold Hübner
- Nico as leader of admirers in Capri (uncredited)

== Music ==
Music plays a major role in the film. The following compositions can be heard:

- La donna e mobile and Un di, se ben rammentomi… from Rigoletto by Giuseppe Verdi
- Come prima (For the First Time), a hit by Panzeri, Di Paola and Taccani
- Oh, Capri, a Tarantella, and the Jamaica-Rock Pineapple Picker by George E. Stoll
- O sole mio, a Neapolitan folk tune
- Lachterzett from the opera Così fan tutte by Wolfgang Amadeus Mozart
- Vesti la giubba from I Pagliacci by Ruggiero Leoncavallo
- I love you by Edvard Grieg
- Death scene from Othello by Giuseppe Verdi
- Ave Maria by Franz Schubert
- Je n'en connais pa la fin by Marguerite Monnot
- Triumphal march from Aida by Giuseppe Verdi
- Who was once in Munich by Bette/Hauff

In addition to the main actor, soloists, the choir and orchestra of the Roman Opera and the Vatican boys' choir sing and play. George E. Stoll, who also contributed two of his own songs, was responsible for directing the music.

== Box office ==
According to MGM records the film earned $710,000 in the US and Canada and $975,000 elsewhere, resulting in a profit of $1,685,000.

== Reception ==
Critics singled out Lanza's singing of "Vesti la Giubba" from Pagliacci and the Death Scene from Otello for special praise, with Howard Thompson of The New York Times calling it the tenor's "most disarming vehicle in years."

== See also ==
- List of films featuring the deaf and hard of hearing
