= Serenade (song from Serenade) =

Song from Serenade (1956)

Single by Mario Lanza

from the album Mario Lanza in "Serenade"
- A-side: "Serenade" "My Destiny"
- Released: 1956
- Recorded: 1955
- Label: RCA Victor
- Composer: Nicholas Brodszky
- Lyricist: Sammy Cahn

Audio
- "Serenade" on YouTube

"Serenade" is the title song of the 1956 Warner Bros. motion picture of the same name. Written by Nicholas Brodsky and Sammy Cahn, it was sung on screen by Mario Lanza.

== Track listing ==
7-inch single (RCA Victor 47-6478, 1956)
| No. | Title | Writer(s) | Length |
|---|---|---|---|
| 1. | "Serenade" (from the Warner Bros. film Serenade) | Sammy Cahn; Nicholas Brodszky | 1:50 |
| 2. | "My Destiny" (from the Warner Bros. film Serenade) | Cahn; Brodszky | 2:30 |

== Slim Whitman version ==
"Serenade"

Single by Slim Whitman
- A-side: "I'm a Fool" "Serenade"
- Released: February 1956
- Genre: Country
- Length: 2:15
- Label: Imperial
- Songwriters: Nicholas Brodsky; Sammy Cahn

Slim Whitman singles chronology
| "Tumbling Tumbleweeds" (1956) | "Serenade" / "I'm a Fool" (1956) | "The Whiffenpoof Song" (1956) |

Slim Whitman UK singles chronology
| "I'm a Fool" / "My Heart Is Broken in Three" (1956) | "Serenade" / "I Talk to the Waves" (1956) | "The Whiffenpoof Song" / "Dear Mary" (1956) |

Audio
- "Serenade" on YouTube

In the same year, the song was released as a single by Slim Whitman. His version reached number 8 in the UK.

=== Track listing ===
7-inch single (Imperial X8305, 1956, United States)
| No. | Title | Writer(s) | Length |
|---|---|---|---|
| 1. | "I'm a Fool" | Tommy Smith |
| 2. | "Serenade" | Nicholas Brodsky; Sammy Cahn |

7-inch single (London Records 45-HL-U 8287, 1956, UK)
| No. | Title | Writer(s) | Length |
|---|---|---|---|
| 1. | "Serenade" (from the film) | Brodszky; Cahn |
| 2. | "I Talk to the Waves" | L. M. Richard |

== Charts ==
Mario Lanza version

| Chart (1956) | Peak position |
|---|---|
| UK Singles (Official Charts) | 25 |

Slim Whitman version

| Chart (1956) | Peak position |
|---|---|
| UK Singles (Official Charts) | 8 |
