= Serenade (1956 film) =

1956 film by Anthony Mann

- Original lobby card
- Directed by: Anthony Mann
- Screenplay by: Ivan Goff; Ben Roberts; John Twist
- Based on: Serenade; 1937 novel by James M. Cain
- Produced by: Henry Blanke
- Starring: Mario Lanza; Joan Fontaine; Sara Montiel; Vincent Price; Joseph Calleia; Vince Edwards; Harry Bellaver
- Cinematography: J. Peverell Marley
- Edited by: William H. Ziegler
- Music by: Nicholas Brodszky
- Production company: Warner Bros. Pictures
- Distributed by: Warner Bros. Pictures
- Release date: March 23, 1956
- Running time: 121 minutes
- Country: United States
- Language: English
- Box office: $1,585,000 (US)

Serenade is a 1956 American musical drama film directed by Anthony Mann and starring tenor Mario Lanza, Joan Fontaine, Sara Montiel (billed as Sarita Montiel), and Vincent Price. Based on the 1937 novel Serenade by James M. Cain, the film was a Warner Bros. Pictures release, Lanza's fifth film, and his first on-screen appearance in four years.

== Plot ==
Serenade tells the story of poor vineyard worker Damon Vincenti (Mario Lanza), who becomes an operatic tenor, and is involved with two women — one a high society hostess, Kendall Hale (Joan Fontaine), the other a Mexican bullfighter's daughter, Juana Montes (Sara Montiel). The tenor has a breakdown because of his unrequited love for the society woman, but finds love (and a happy ending) with the Mexican girl. Highly melodramatic, the film features a great deal of operatic music, all of it sung by Lanza. Of note are the Act III Monologue from Verdi's Otello and an extract from the duet "Dio ti giocondi" from the same opera featuring Metropolitan Opera soprano Licia Albanese.

== Cast ==
- Mario Lanza as Damon Vincenti
- Joan Fontaine as Kendall Hale
- Sara Montiel as Juana Montes (as Sarita Montiel)
- Vincent Price as Charles Winthrop
- Joseph Calleia as Maestro Marcatello
- Harry Bellaver as Tonio
- Vince Edwards as Marco Roselli
- Silvio Minciotti as Lardelli
- Frank Puglia as Manuel Montes
- Edward Platt as Everett Carter
- Licia Albanese as Desdemona in Otello
- Jean Fenn as Soprano in San Francisco

== Differences from the source novel ==
The movie differs greatly from the James M. Cain source novel. In the book, the male protagonist is John Howard Sharp, a professional opera singer who has lost his voice and fled the United States to Mexico in a crisis of confidence after being sexually wooed (not unsuccessfully, though details are vague) by a male socialite and impresario. Juana Montes is a Mexican prostitute who sees Sharp as gay and therefore a trouble-free partner to open a brothel with. But after having sex in a deserted church with Juana, Sharp recovers his voice and his preferred sexual identity. The two lovers come into conflict with the local police and flee to Los Angeles, where Sharp reestablishes his singing career, more successful than ever. But once they move to New York, the singer must struggle against the renewed blandishments of the gay impresario, whom Juana eventually murders with a torero's sword. As none of this material could be considered suitable for an American movie in 1956, the story's male impresario becomes female instead and the Mexican prostitute becomes a Mexican bullfighter's daughter.

== Production ==
Film rights to the novel were bought in 1946 by the production company of Michael Curtiz.

Anthony Mann got involved in the project through his agents, MCA, who also represented Mario Lanza. "They introduced me to him. I got to know him and I really liked the guy, even though everyone was kicking him down, saying he’d never make another film. And I guess it was really more out of a stupid sentimentality, but I felt sorry for the guy...I knew it was going to be a terrible, terrible problem, because he was a compulsive eater and a compulsive drinker, but he was a marvellous, warm-hearted guy and I don’t think all the horrible things they said about him were true."

Mann was admonished not to make a film with Lanza, due to the tenor's notorious reputation for being temperamental and very difficult to work with. "It was probably sentiment, but I decided I would. Terrible things happened, it was all very, very difficult, and the fact that I was able to finish it was a miracle. That’s the only miracle about it, because the film’s not good."

Mann liked some of the things about the movie. "I thought he did a couple of scenes quite well: his singing of Otello was very beautiful... It was one of those things for which I should never have approached, but I’m glad I did it in a way.... But we tried very hard to make something of it pictorially and went to some magnificent places in Mexico.... But its story was weak. How can you tell a story anyway when you’re singing arias all the time?"

== Songs ==
- "Serenade"
- "My Destiny"
- "Nessun dorma"

== Reception ==
Reviewing the film in The New York Times, A. H. Weiler wrote that Lanza, "who was never in better voice, makes this a full and sometimes impressive musical entertainment."

The film suffered a purported loss of $695,000.

== See also ==
- List of American films of 1956

== Bibliography ==
- Cesari, Armando. Mario Lanza: An American Tragedy. (Fort Worth: Baskerville 2004)
