= Nicholas Brodszky =

American songwriter (1905–1958)

- Николас Бродский
- Born: Nicholas Brodszky; 20 April 1905; Odessa, Russian Empire (now Ukraine)
- Died: 24 December 1958 (aged 53); Hollywood, California, U.S.
- Other name: "Slug" Brodszky
- Occupations: Composer, songwriter
- Years active: 1932–1958
- Notable work: “Be My Love”; “Because You're Mine”; “I'll Never Stop Loving You”; “I’ll Walk with God”; “Serenade”
- Awards: 5× Oscar nominee, Academy Award for Best Original Song

Nicholas "Slug" Brodszky (Russian: Николай Бродский; April 20, 1905 – December 24, 1958) was a composer of popular songs for the theatre and for films.

Brodszky was born in Odessa, today Ukraine (previously in Russian Empire, 1772–1917), into a Jewish family, who moved to Budapest during the civil war in Russia. He spent many years studying and working in Rome, Vienna, Berlin and Budapest. In the 1920s he contributed songs to Viennese operettas. His first film was made in Vienna in 1930 and featured Richard Tauber and Gitta Alpar. He wrote the music for C B Cochran and A P Herbert's coronation revue Home and Beauty at the Adelphi Theatre in 1937.

After a decade in the film industry in Germany and Austria, always keeping one step ahead of the rising Nazi party, he emigrated to the UK at the end of the 1930s. There he had some success providing music for the Terence Rattigan scripted film French Without Tears (1939), and The Way to the Stars (1949), both directed by Anthony Asquith. He also wrote the score for the Yiddish language film Der Purimspieler (1939).

He emigrated once again to the United States at the end of the 1940s. In Hollywood, he composed for many musical films including The Toast of New Orleans (1950); Rich, Young and Pretty (1951); Because You're Mine (1952); Small Town Girl (1953); The Student Prince (1954); Love Me or Leave Me (1955); and Serenade (1956).

Among the hit songs he wrote with lyricist Sammy Cahn were "Be My Love" (his most popular song, from The Toast of New Orleans), "I'll Never Stop Loving You," "Because You're Mine," "Serenade," and "My Destiny." He wrote three songs for The Student Prince: "Summertime in Heidelberg," "Beloved," and "I'll Walk with God" (with lyrics by Paul Francis Webster) to supplement the Sigmund Romberg musical score for the 1954 filmed version. Recordings of "Be My Love" and "Because You're Mine" made by the famous 1950s tenor and movie star Mario Lanza were million-seller hits (gold records) on the RCA Victor Red Seal label.

Five of Nicholas Brodszky's musical compositions were nominated for Academy Awards for Best Original Song:

- 1950, "Be My Love"
- 1951, "Wonder Why"
- 1952, "Because You're Mine"
- 1953, "My Flaming Heart"
- 1955, "I'll Never Stop Loving You"

Brodszky was a tunesmith who always needed the help of arrangers and assistants to turn his ideas into finished compositions. These assistants included Roy Douglas, Philip Green, Skip Martin, Clive Richardson, Mischa Spoliansky, Albert Sendrey, Sidney Torch and Charles Williams, but they were rarely credited. Lionel Salter termed Brodszky a 'near-illiterate.'

He died in Hollywood, California in 1958, aged 53.

== Selected filmography ==
- The Big Attraction (1931)
- The Virtuous Sinner (1931)
- Gitta Discovers Her Heart (1932)
- Scandal in Budapest (1933)
- Romance in Budapest (1933)
- Peter (1934)
- Unripe Fruit (1934)
- A Precocious Girl (1934)
- Little Mother (1935)
- Guilty Melody (1936)
- Catherine the Last (1936)
- Der Purimspieler (1939)
- Quiet Wedding (1941)
- Freedom Radio (1941)
- The Demi-Paradise (1943)
- Tomorrow We Live (1943)
- English Without Tears (1944)
- Carnival (1946)
- A Man About the House (1947)
- While the Sun Shines (1947)
- The Toast of New Orleans (1950)
- Rich, Young and Pretty (1951)
- Because You're Mine (1952)
- Small Town Girl (1953)
- The Student Prince ( 1954 )
- Love Me or Leave Me (1955)
- Serenade (1956)
- Ten Thousand Bedrooms (1957)
