= Mario Lanza =

American tenor and actor (1921–1959)

- MGM still of Mario Lanza, c. 1950
- Born: Alfredo Arnold Cocozza; January 31, 1921; Philadelphia, Pennsylvania, US
- Died: October 7, 1959 (aged 38); Rome, Lazio, Italy
- Education: Berkshire Music Center
- Occupations: Tenor; actor
- Years active: 1942–1959
- Spouse: Betty Hicks (m. 1945)
- Children: 4

Mario Lanza (US: /ˈlɑːnzə, ˈlænzə/ LA(H)N-zə; Italian: [ˈmaːrjo ˈlantsa]; born Alfredo Arnold Cocozza [alˈfreːdo koˈkottsa]; January 31, 1921 – October 7, 1959) was an American tenor and actor. He was a Hollywood film star popular in the late 1940s and the 1950s. Lanza began studying to be a professional singer at the age of 16. After appearing at the Hollywood Bowl in 1947, Lanza signed a seven-year film contract with Louis B. Mayer, the head of Metro-Goldwyn-Mayer, who saw his performance and was impressed by his singing. Prior to that, the adult Lanza sang only two performances of an opera. The following year (1948) he sang the role of Pinkerton in Puccini's Madama Butterfly in New Orleans.

His film debut for MGM was in That Midnight Kiss (1949) with Kathryn Grayson and Ethel Barrymore. A year later, in The Toast of New Orleans, his featured popular song "Be My Love" became his first million-selling hit. In 1951, he starred as tenor Enrico Caruso, his idol, in the biopic The Great Caruso, which produced another million-seller with "The Loveliest Night of the Year" (a song which used the melody of Sobre las Olas). The Great Caruso was the 11th top-grossing film that year.

The title song of his next film, Because You're Mine, was his final million-selling hit song. The song went on to receive an Academy Award nomination for Best Original Song. After recording the soundtrack for his next film, The Student Prince, he embarked upon a protracted battle with studio head Dore Schary arising from artistic differences with director Curtis Bernhardt and was eventually fired by MGM.

Lanza was known to be "rebellious, tough, and ambitious". During most of his film career, he suffered from addictions to overeating and alcohol, which had a serious effect on his health and his relationships with directors, producers, and, occasionally, other cast members. Hollywood columnist Hedda Hopper writes that "his smile, which was as big as his voice, was matched with the habits of a tiger cub, impossible to housebreak." She adds that he was the "last of the great romantic performers". He made three more films before dying of an apparent pulmonary embolism at the age of 38. At the time of his death in 1959, he was still "the most famous tenor in the world". Author Eleonora Kimmel concludes that Lanza "blazed like a meteor whose light lasts a brief moment in time".

== Early years ==
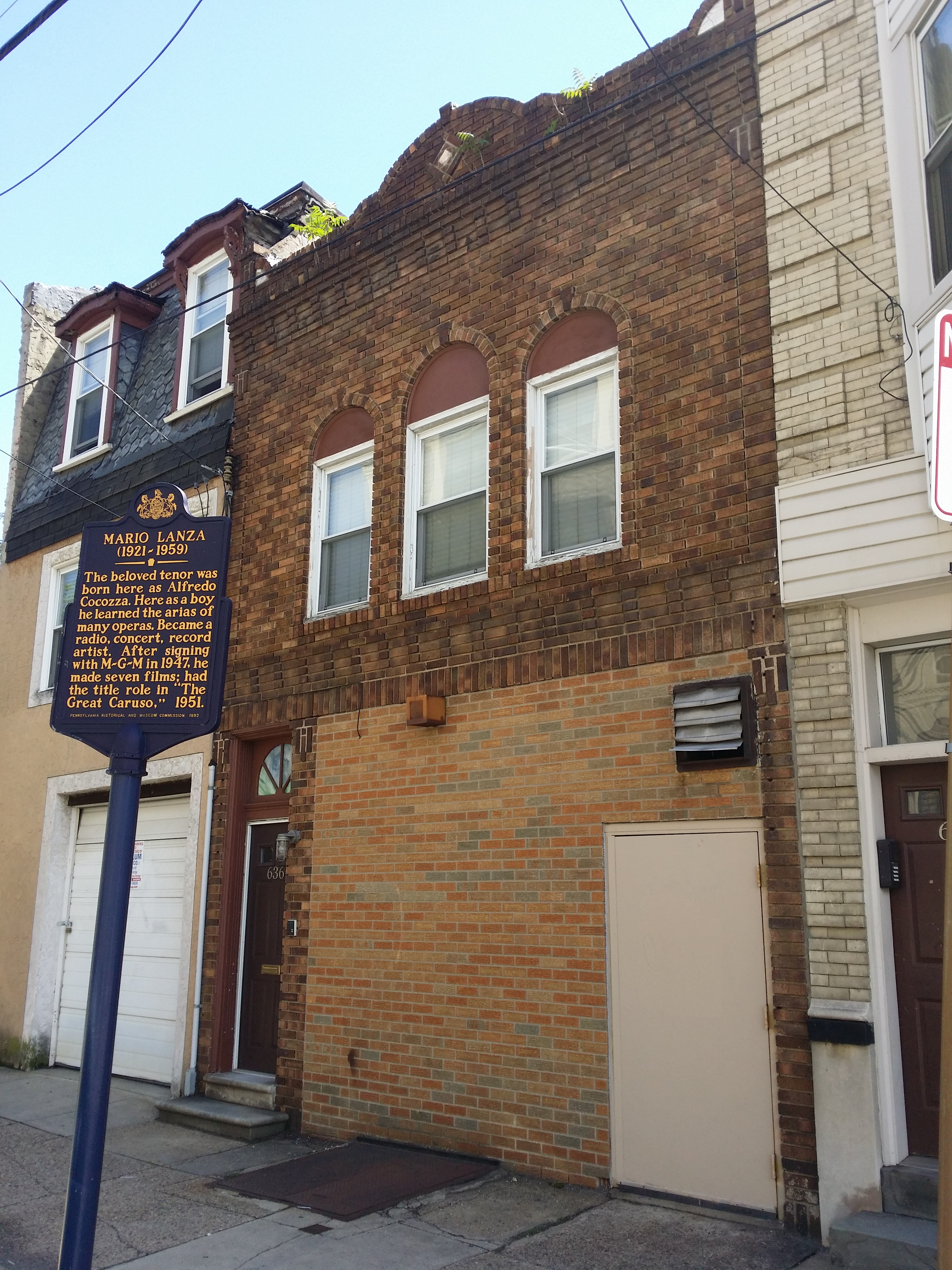
Mario Lanza's birthplace, 636 Christian Street, Philadelphia - June 8, 2016, demolished July 2018

Born Alfredo Arnold Cocozza in Philadelphia, he was exposed to classical singing at an early age by his Abruzzese-Molisan Italian parents. His mother, Maria Lanza, was from Tocco da Casauria, a town in the province of Pescara in the region of Abruzzo. His father, Antonio Cocozza, was from Filignano, a town in the province of Isernia in the region of Molise.

By age 16, his vocal talent had become apparent. Starting out in local operatic productions in Philadelphia for the YMCA Opera Company while still in his teens, he later came to the attention of longtime (1924–49) principal Boston Symphony conductor Serge Koussevitzky. In 1942, Koussevitzky provided young Cocozza with a full student scholarship to the Berkshire Music Center at Tanglewood, Massachusetts. Reportedly, Koussevitzky later told him "Yours is a voice such as is heard once in a hundred years."

== Opera career ==
Mario Lanza in his early career

He made the first of his few appearances in opera as Fenton in Otto Nicolai's The Merry Wives of Windsor (in English) at the Berkshire Music Festival in Tanglewood on August 7, 1942, after a period of study with conductors Boris Goldovsky and Leonard Bernstein. During this time, Cocozza adopted the stage name Mario Lanza because of its similarity to his mother's maiden name, Maria Lanza.

The performances at Tanglewood won Lanza critical acclaim, with Noel Straus of The New York Times hailing the 21-year-old tenor as having "few equals among tenors of the day in terms of quality, warmth and power". Herbert Graf subsequently wrote in Opera News (October 5, 1942), "A real find of the season was Mario Lanza [...] He would have no difficulty one day being asked to join the Metropolitan Opera." Lanza sang Nicolai's Fenton twice at Tanglewood, in addition to appearing there in a one-off presentation of Act III of Puccini's La bohème with the noted Mexican soprano Irma González, baritone James Pease, and mezzo-soprano Laura Castellano. Music critic Jay C. Rosenfeld wrote in The New York Times of August 9, 1942, "Irma González as Mimì and Mario Lanza as Rodolfo were conspicuous by the beauty of their voices and the vividness of their characterizations." In an interview shortly before her own death in 2008, González recalled that Lanza was "very correct, likeable, with a powerful and beautiful voice".

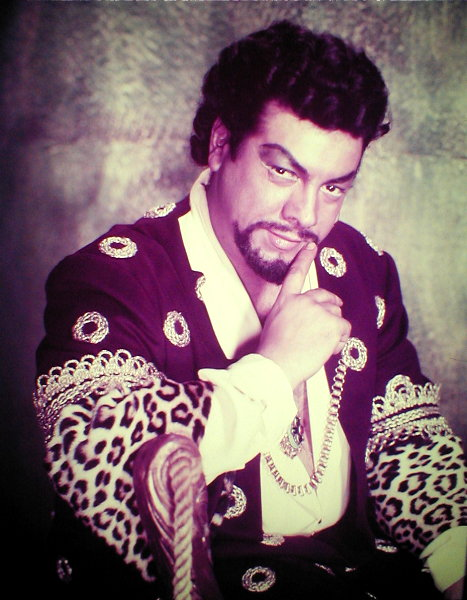
Lanza as Giuseppe Verdi's Otello

Lanza's aspiring operatic career was interrupted in World War II when he was assigned to Special Services in the U.S. Army Air Corps. He appeared in the wartime shows On the Beam and Winged Victory. He also appeared in the film version of the latter (albeit as an unrecognizable member of the chorus). He resumed his singing career with a concert in Atlantic City, New Jersey, with the NBC Symphony Orchestra in September 1945 under Peter Herman Adler, who subsequently became his mentor. The following month, he replaced tenor Jan Peerce on the live CBS radio program Great Moments in Music, on which he made six appearances in four months, singing extracts from various operas and other works.

Lanza studied with Enrico Rosati for 15 months and then embarked on an 86-concert tour of the United States, Canada, and Mexico from July 1947 until May 1948 with bass George London and soprano Frances Yeend. Reviewing his second appearance at Chicago's Grant Park in July 1947 in the Chicago Sunday Tribune, Claudia Cassidy praised Lanza's "superbly natural tenor" and observed that "though a multitude of fine points evade him, he possesses the things almost impossible to learn. He knows the accent that makes a lyric line reach its audience, and he knows why opera is music drama."

In April 1948, Lanza sang two performances as Pinkerton in Puccini's Madama Butterfly for the New Orleans Opera Association conducted by Walter Herbert with stage director Armando Agnini. Reviewing the opening-night performance in the St. Louis News (April 9, 1948), Laurence Oden wrote "Mario Lanza performed ... Lieutenant Pinkerton with considerable verve and dash. Rarely have we seen a more superbly romantic leading tenor. His exceptionally beautiful voice helps immeasurably." Following the success of these performances, he was invited to return to New Orleans in 1949 as Alfredo in Verdi's La traviata. But, as biographer Armando Cesari wrote, Lanza by 1949 "was already deeply engulfed in the Hollywood machinery and consequently never learned [that key mid-Verdi tenor] role."

At the time of his death, Lanza was finally preparing to embark on an operatic career. Conductor Peter Herman Adler, with whom Lanza previously had worked both in concert and on the soundtrack of The Great Caruso, visited the tenor in Rome during the summer of 1959 and later recalled that "[Lanza] was working two hours a day with an operatic coach, and intended to go back to opera, his only true love." Adler promised the tenor "all possible help" in his "planning for his operatic future." In the October 14, 1959 edition of Variety, it was reported that Lanza had planned to make his return to opera in the role of Canio in Leoncavallo's Pagliacci during the Rome Opera's 1960–61 season. This was subsequently confirmed by Riccardo Vitale, artistic director of the Rome Opera. Variety also noted that preparations had been underway at the time of Lanza's death for him to participate in a series of complete opera recordings for RCA Victor to be recorded in Rome by RCA Italiana.

== Film career ==
A concert at the Hollywood Bowl in August 1947 had brought Lanza to the attention of Louis B. Mayer, who promptly signed Lanza to a seven-year film contract with Metro-Goldwyn-Mayer. The contract required him to commit to the studio for six months of the year, and Lanza initially believed he would be able to combine his film career with his operatic and concert appearances. In May 1949, he made his first commercial recordings for RCA Victor. Lanza's recording of the aria "Che gelida manina" (from La bohème) from that first session was subsequently awarded the prize of Operatic Recording of the Year by the (United States) National Record Critics Association.

=== The Toast of New Orleans ===
Lanza's first two starring films, That Midnight Kiss and The Toast of New Orleans, both opposite top-billed Kathryn Grayson, were commercial successes, and in 1950, his recording of "Be My Love" from the latter became the first of three million-selling singles for the young tenor, earning him enormous fame in the process. While at MGM, Lanza worked closely with Academy Award-winning conductor, composer, and arranger Johnny Green.

In a 1977 interview with Lanza biographer Armando Cesari, Green recalled that the tenor was insecure about the manner in which he had become successful and was keenly aware of the fact that he had become a Hollywood star before first having established himself on the operatic stage.

Had [Lanza] been already a leading tenor, if not the leading tenor at the Met[ropolitan Opera House], and come to Hollywood in between seasons to make a picture, he would have had [the security of having] the Met as his home," Green remarked. According to Green, Lanza possessed "the voice of the next Caruso. [Lanza] had an unusual, very unusual quality ... a tenor with a baritone color in the middle and lower registers, and a great feeling for the making of music. A great musicality. I found it fascinating, musically, to work with [him].

=== The Great Caruso ===
External audio
- Mario Lanza sings arias from his album "The Great Caruso" with the RCA Victor Orchestra; Listen on archive.org

Lanza portrayed Enrico Caruso in The Great Caruso (1951), which was MGM's biggest success of the year. At this time, the tenor's increasing popularity exposed him to intense criticism by some music critics, including those who had praised his work just a few years earlier. His portrayal of Caruso earned him compliments from the subject's son, Enrico Caruso Jr., a tenor in his own right. Shortly before his own death in 1987, Enrico Jr. wrote in Enrico Caruso: My Father and My Family (posthumously published in 1990) that:

I can think of no other tenor, before or since Mario Lanza, who could have risen with comparable success to the challenge of playing Caruso in a screen biography ... Lanza was born with one of the dozen or so great tenor voices of the century, with a natural voice placement, an unmistakable and very pleasing timbre, and a nearly infallible musical instinct.

=== The Student Prince ===
Tenor Richard Tucker (left) speaking with Lanza in 1958 at Tucker's Covent Garden debut as Andrea Chénier

Lanza's next film for MGM, Because You're Mine (1952) was another financial, if not critical success; Lanza felt the script was far inferior to The Great Caruso, and he didn't want to make the film. Lanza's reputation for being temperamental and difficult began during this production. Later in 1952, Lanza was suspended and ultimately fired by MGM after he had recorded the songs for his next film, The Student Prince (1954). The reason most frequently cited in the tabloid press at the time was that his recurring weight problem had made it impossible for him to fit into the costumes of the Prince. However, as his biographers Cesari and Mannering have established, Lanza was not overweight at the beginning of the production, and it was, in fact, a disagreement with director Curtis Bernhardt over Lanza's performance of one of the songs in the film that led to Lanza walking off the set. MGM refused to replace Bernhardt, and the film was subsequently made starring British actor Edmund Purdom, who lip-synched to Lanza's dubbed singing voice.

Depressed by his dismissal by MGM and with his self-confidence severely undermined, Lanza became a virtual recluse in his home for more than a year, frequently seeking refuge in alcoholic and eating binges. During this period, Lanza's lavish spending habits and poor financial decisions by his former manager had brought him to the brink of bankruptcy. Additionally, Lanza owed around $250,000 in unpaid taxes to the US Internal Revenue Service (IRS).

=== Serenade ===
Lanza returned to an active film career in Serenade (1956), released by Warner Bros. However, the film was only a moderate financial success despite strong musical content, including arias from Der Rosenkavalier, Fedora, L'arlesiana, and Otello, as well as the Act I duet from Otello with soprano Licia Albanese. In 1980, Mme. Albanese said of Lanza:

I had heard all sorts of stories about Mario. That his voice was too small for the stage, that he couldn't learn a score, that he couldn't sustain a full opera; in fact, that he couldn't even sing a full aria, that his recordings were made by splicing together various portions of an aria. None of it is true! He had the most beautiful lirico spinto voice. It was a gorgeous, beautiful, powerful voice. I should know because I sang with so many tenors. He had everything that one needs. The voice, the temperament, perfect diction. ... Vocally he was very secure. All he needed was coaching. Everything was so easy for him. He was fantastic!

External audio
- Mario Lanza sings "Seven Hills of Rome" & "La Donna e mobile" with Constantine Callinicos at London's Royal Albert Hall in 1958 Here on archive.org

In May 1957, Lanza moved to Rome, Italy where he starred in the film Seven Hills of Rome (1958), and returned to performing live in November of that year, appearing before Queen Elizabeth II at the Royal Variety Show at the London Palladium. From January to April 1958, Lanza gave a concert tour of the UK, Belgium, the Netherlands, France and Germany. He gave a total of 22 concerts on this tour, receiving mostly positive reviews for his singing. Despite a number of cancellations, which resulted from his poor health during this period, Lanza continued to receive offers for operatic appearances, concerts, and films.

In September 1958, Lanza made a number of operatic recordings at the Rome Opera House for the soundtrack of what would turn out to be his final film, For the First Time (1959). It was then that he came to the attention of that opera house's artistic director, Riccardo Vitale, who promptly offered the tenor carte blanche in his choice of operatic roles. Lanza also received offers to sing in any opera of his choosing from the San Carlo in Naples. During this time, however, the tenor's health was declining; Lanza was suffering from a variety of ailments, including phlebitis and acute high blood pressure. His old habits of overeating and crash dieting, coupled with binge drinking, compounded his problems.

== Personal life and demise ==
Lanza's friend Bert Hicks introduced him to his sister, Betty Hicks. Lanza and Betty began dating, and the couple were married by a judge at the Beverly Hills city hall on April 13, 1945. Later that year, on July 15, they had a religious ceremony at a Catholic church. They had four children: Coleen (born December 9, 1948, died 1997), Ellisa (born December 3, 1950), Damon (born December 12, 1952, died August 16, 2008), and Marc (born May 19, 1954, died 1993).

In April 1959, Lanza reportedly fell ill, mainly with heart problems as well as pneumonia. On September 25, 1959, he entered Rome's Valle Giulia clinic for the purpose of losing weight for an upcoming film. While in the clinic, he underwent a controversial weight loss program colloquially known as "the twilight sleep treatment", which required its patients to be kept immobile and sedated for prolonged periods. On October 7, Lanza died of an apparent pulmonary embolism at age 38. No autopsy was performed. Maria Caniglia, Franco Fabrizi, and Enzo Fiermonte attended the funeral services in Rome. Frank Sinatra sent his condolences by telegram. Lanza's body was returned to the US and entombed in the mausoleum at Holy Cross Cemetery in Culver City, California.

Just over five months later, Betty Lanza died on March 11, 1960. The coroner's report stated that large amounts of seconal and alcohol were found in her system. Maria Lanza Cocozza, the tenor's mother, was named the legal guardian of her four orphaned grandchildren.

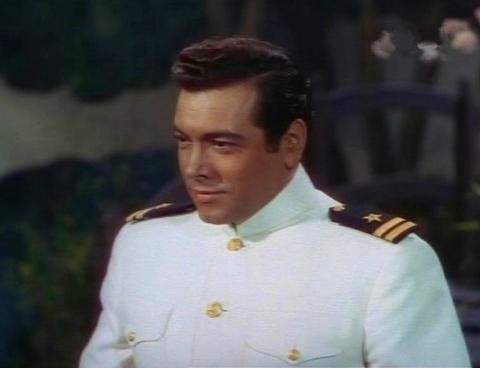
From the film Toast of New Orleans, as Lt. Pinkerton USN, in recreation of the opera Madama Butterfly

== Legacy ==
=== Musical legacy ===
Lanza was the first RCA Victor Red Seal artist to win a gold disc and the first artist to sell two and a half million albums. He was referred to by some sources as the "new Caruso" after his "instant success" in Hollywood films, while MGM hoped he would become the movie studio's "singing Clark Gable" for his good looks and powerful voice. He was a big inspiration to fellow RCA Victor recording star Elvis Presley. A year after Lanza's death, Presley recorded an English translation of "O Sole Mio", which was popularized by Lanza. This song, "It's Now or Never", went on to be one of Presley's all-time best selling songs.

In 1994, José Carreras paid tribute to Lanza during a worldwide concert tour, saying, "If I'm an opera singer, it's thanks to Mario Lanza." Plácido Domingo stated, "Lanza's passion and the way his voice sounds are what made me sing opera. I actually owe my love for opera...to a kid from Philadelphia."

Because Lanza appeared on the operatic stage only twice, many critics felt that he needed to have had more experience in major theaters before he could have been considered an opera star. His films, especially The Great Caruso, influenced several future opera stars, including Joseph Calleja, José Carreras, Plácido Domingo, Luciano Pavarotti, and Vyacheslav Polozov. According to opera historian Clyde McCants, "Of all the Hollywood singers who performed operatic music...the one who made the greatest impact was Mario Lanza." Hollywood gossip columnist Hedda Hopper concluded that "there had never been anyone like Mario, and I doubt whether we shall ever see his like again".

=== Portrayal on screen and stage ===
A 90-minute PBS documentary, Mario Lanza: The American Caruso, hosted by Plácido Domingo and featuring Lanza's family and professional associates, was released in 1983, and nominated for a Primetime Emmy for Outstanding Informational Series or Special that same year. In October 2007, Charles Messina directed the musical Be My Love: The Mario Lanza Story, written by Richard Vetere and produced by Sonny Grosso and Phil Ramone, about Lanza's life. It premiered at The Tilles Center for the Performing Arts in Greenvale, New York.

=== Monuments and honors ===
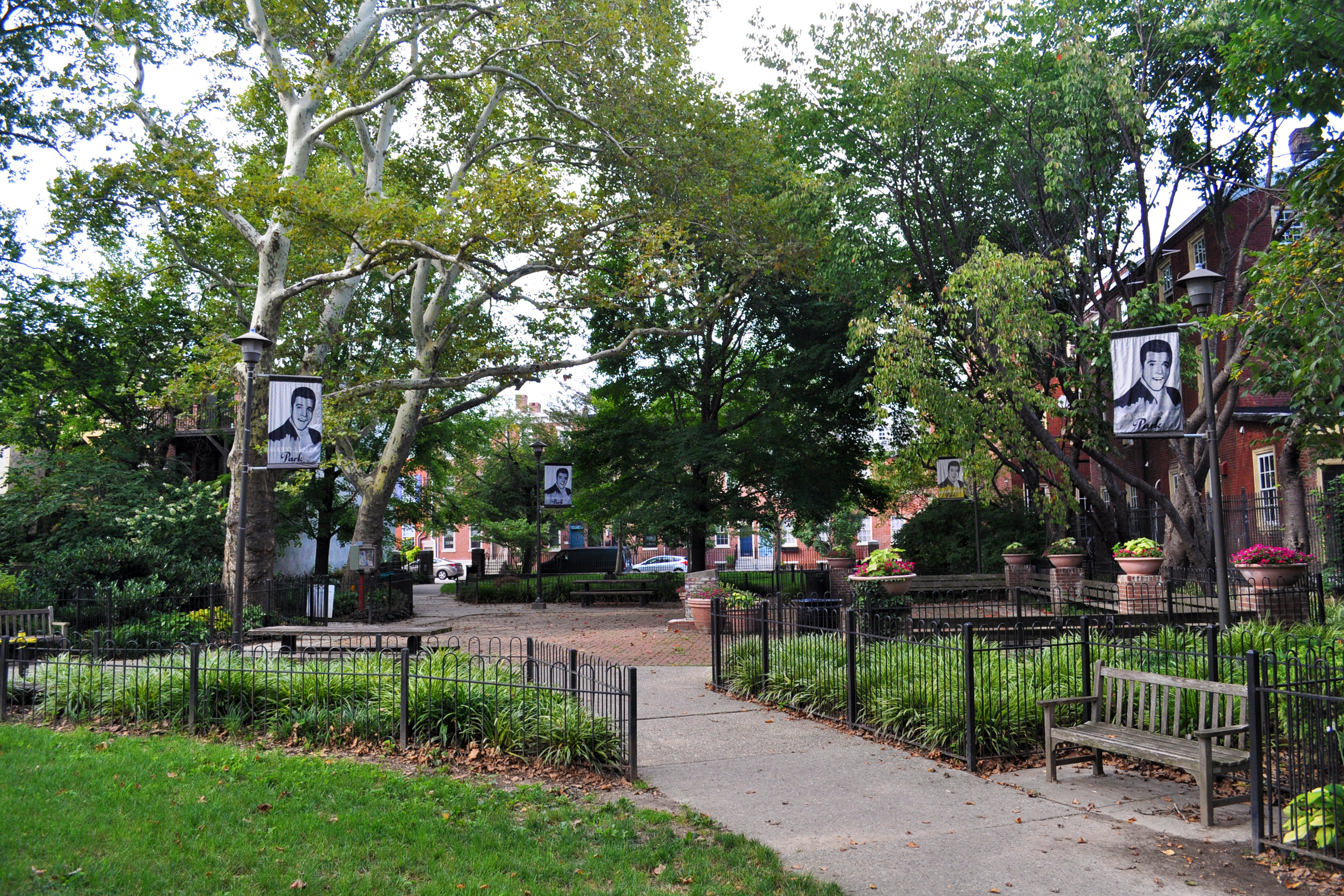
Mario Lanza Park in Philadelphia was named after the singer

- Mario Lanza Boulevard is a roadway in the Eastwick section of Lanza's native Philadelphia.
- The Mario Lanza Institute and Museum, which honors Lanza's legacy and also provides scholarships to young singers, is located at 1214 Reed Street in South Philadelphia.
- Philadelphia's Queen Street Park was renamed for Lanza in 1967.
- A Pennsylvania Historical and Museum Commission marker was placed to mark the home at 636 Christian Street in South Philadelphia where Lanza was born after it was demolished. In 1998, a Golden Palm Star on the Palm Springs, California, Walk of Stars was dedicated to him.
- Lanza was awarded two Stars on the Hollywood Walk of Fame: a Star for Recording at 1751 Vine Street, and a Star at 6821 Hollywood Boulevard for Motion Pictures.

== Filmography ==
Year	Title	Role	Studio	Notes	Ref
1944	Winged Victory	a chorus member (uncredited)	Twentieth Century-Fox	also known as Moss Hart's Winged Victory	
1949	That Midnight Kiss	Johnny Donnetti	Metro-Goldwyn-Mayer		
1950	The Toast of New Orleans	Pepe Abellard Duvalle	Metro-Goldwyn-Mayer		
1951	The Great Caruso	Enrico Caruso	Metro-Goldwyn-Mayer		
1952	Because You're Mine	Renaldo Rossano	Metro-Goldwyn-Mayer		
1954	The Student Prince	Prince Karl (singing voice)	Metro-Goldwyn-Mayer		
1956	Serenade	Damon Vincenti	Warner Bros.		
1957	Seven Hills of Rome	Marc Revere	Metro-Goldwyn-Mayer	also known as Arrivederci Roma	
1959	For the First Time	Tonio Costa	Metro-Goldwyn-Mayer	final film role	

=== Box office ranking ===
At the height of his career, Lanza was voted by exhibitors as being among the most popular stars in the country:

- 1951 – 13th most popular (US), 10th (UK)
- 1952 – 23rd (US), 6th (UK)

== Select discography ==
Studio albums

- That Midnight Kiss (1949)
- Operatic Arias and Duets as Sung in "The Toast of New Orleans" (1950)
- Mario Lanza Sings Popular Songs from the M-G-M Technicolor Motion Picture "The Toast of New Orleans" (1950)
- Mario Lanza Sings Selections from "The Great Caruso" (1951)
- Mario Lanza Sings Christmas Songs (1951)
- Mario Lanza Sings Songs from M-G-M's Technicolor Motion Picture "Because You're Mine" (1952)
- Mario Lanza Sings the Hit Songs from "The Student Prince" and Other Great Musical Comedies (1954)
- Mario Lanza in "Serenade" (1956)
- Seven Hills of Rome (1958)
- For the First Time (1959)
