= The Great Caruso =

1951 film by Richard Thorpe

- Original film poster
- Directed by: Richard Thorpe
- Written by: William Ludwig
- Based on: Enrico Caruso, His Life and Death; 1945 book by Dorothy Caruso
- Produced by: Joe Pasternak
- Starring: Mario Lanza
- Cinematography: Joseph Ruttenberg
- Edited by: Gene Ruggiero
- Music by: Johnny Green
- Production company: Metro-Goldwyn-Mayer
- Distributed by: Loew's Inc.
- Release dates: April 26, 1951 (Cincinnati); May 10, 1951 (New York)
- Running time: 109 mins
- Country: United States
- Language: English
- Budget: $1,853,000
- Box office: $9,269,000

The Great Caruso is a 1951 biographical film directed by Richard Thorpe, produced by Joe Pasternak, distributed by Metro-Goldwyn-Mayer and starring Mario Lanza as operatic tenor Enrico Caruso. The highly fictionalized screenplay, written by Sonya Levien and William Ludwig, is based on the biography Enrico Caruso His Life and Death by Dorothy Caruso, Caruso's widow. The original music was composed and arranged by Johnny Green, the cinematographer was Joseph Ruttenberg and the costume designers were Helen Rose and Gile Steele.

== Plot ==
The film follows the life of Enrico Caruso from his humble beginnings in Naples to his rise as one of the world’s greatest opera singers.

As a young man, Caruso dreams of becoming a professional singer despite poverty and setbacks. His exceptional voice eventually earns him opportunities to perform in major opera houses across Europe. Along the way, he faces professional rivalries, romantic disappointments, and the pressures of fame.

Caruso’s career reaches new heights when he becomes a star at the Metropolitan Opera in New York, where his powerful performances make him an international celebrity. The film also focuses on his romance with Dorothy Benjamin, whom he eventually marries, and portrays the more personal side of his life behind the fame.

As his health begins to decline, Caruso struggles to continue performing but remains devoted to his art. The story concludes with his lasting legacy as one of opera’s most beloved and influential singers.

== Cast ==
- Mario Lanza as Enrico Caruso
- Ann Blyth as Dorothy Park Benjamin
- Dorothy Kirsten as Louise Heggar
- Jarmila Novotna as Maria Selka
- Ludwig Donath as Alfredo Brazzi
- Carl Benton Reid as Park Benjamin
- Eduard Franz as Giulio Gatti-Casazza
- Pál Jávor as Antonio Scotti (credited as Paul Javor)
- Alan Napier as Jean De Reszke
- Shepard Menken as Fucito
- Carl Milletaire as Gino
- Vincent Renno as Tullio
- Nestor Paiva as Egisto Barretto
- Argentina Brunetti as Signora Barretto
- Yvette Duguay as Musetta Barretto
- Ian Wolfe as Hutchins
- Richard Hageman as Carlo Santi, opera conductor
- Peter Edward Price as Caruso (as a boy)
- Angela Clarke as Mama Caruso
- Mario Siletti as Papa Caruso
- Peter Brocco as Father Bronzetti (uncredited)

Metropolitan Opera stars Teresa Celli, Lucine Amara, Marina Koshetz, Blanche Thebom, Giuseppe Valdengo and Nicola Moscona are among the 24 operatic singers who appear in the film.

== Production ==
Peter Herman Adler was hired as a technical advisor for the film and served as voice coach for Mario Lanza. Adler also supervised the recording of the film's music.

Although The Great Caruso follows most of the basic facts of Caruso's life, several of the characters and incidents are fictional. Because of this, the Caruso family in Italy successfully sued MGM for monetary damages, and the studio was temporarily ordered to withdraw the film from exhibition in Italy. The factual discrepancies include:

- A montage shows the rise of the young Caruso from operatic chorister to singing the secondary tenor role of Spoletta in Puccini's opera Tosca. Caruso never sang in an opera chorus, nor did he ever appear in a supporting role. When Tosca premiered in 1900, Caruso was already a rising opera star and had been considered by Puccini himself for the lead tenor role of Cavaradossi, though the part was given to another tenor, Emilio de Marchi.
- In the film, Caruso makes his American debut at the Metropolitan Opera in Verdi's Aida and is met with silence from the audience and scathing critical reviews. In reality, Caruso's Met debut in Rigoletto was well-received and he became an immediate favorite with New York audiences and critics.
- Opera impresario Giulio Gatti-Casazza is depicted as the general manager of the Metropolitan Opera at the time of Caruso's debut there in 1903. In reality, Gatti-Casazza did not arrive at the Met until 1908, five years after Caruso's debut.
- In the film, Caruso and Dorothy Park Benjamin appear to meet at the time of his Metropolitan Opera debut in 1903 and marry after Caruso returns from a lengthy world tour, which appears to last for several years. In actuality, Caruso and Dorothy met in 1917 and married the following year. Caruso never made such a long world tour; though he frequently sang in several countries, the Metropolitan Opera was Caruso's artistic home, singing there regularly each season from 1903 to 1920.
- Caruso's clandestine relationship with married Italian soprano Ada Giachetti from 1898 to 1908 that produced two sons is not depicted or mentioned in the film.
- At the end of the film, Caruso appears to die on the stage at the Met after a throat hemorrhage during a performance of Martha. Caruso did experience a throat or mouth hemorrhage during a Met performance of L'elisir d'amore at the Brooklyn Academy of Music on December 11, 1920, from which he recovered. He did not die until August 2, 1921, in Naples, possibly of peritonitis after many months of illness and several surgical procedures.

During production, director Richard Thorpe was quoted as saying: "'The Great Caruso' is as authentic as we can make it and maintain interest. We cannot pay too much attention to the actual chronology, but as far as possible the film is biographical. Maybe we'll get letters complaining about certain things, but we can justify them."

== Release ==
The Great Caruso premiered on April 26, 1951, in Cincinnati, which was selected because of the area's overwhelmingly positive reaction to Mario Lanza's recent concert there.

The film's general release was timed for National Music Week, May 6–12, 1951. It opened at Radio City Music Hall in New York on May 10, 1951.

The Hollywood premiere at Grauman's Egyptian Theatre on May 29, 1951, was attended by several popular singing stars of the day, such as Perry Como, Doris Day and Nelson Eddy, as well as prominent conductors, composers and other Hollywood personalities. Actor Walter Woolf King served as master of ceremonies at the premiere.

Lanza embarked on a planned 20-city concert tour in January 1951 that was intended to promote the film. However, he was forced to cancel at least eight of the concerts when he became ill with pleurisy.

== Reception ==
In a contemporary review for The New York Times, critic Bosley Crowther wrote:

All of the silliest, sappiest clichés of musical biography have been written by Sonya Levien and William Ludwig into the script. And Richard Thorpe has directed in a comparably mawkish, bathetic style. Caruso, according to this picture, was just a boyish, lighthearted troubadour who lost that heart the very first day that he arrived in romantic New York. And the little lady to whom he lost it only happened to be the schoolgirl daughter of a rock-ribbed Maecenas of the Metropolitan Opera House. So his extra-curricular activity, according to this film, was simply that of pursuing the little lady, against her father's wishes, until finally she was his. ... Something better—much better—as a story might have been contrived for the biography of Caruso, and something more subtle, too. ... Likewise, the performance of the romance—even that—should have been much better, too. Mr. Lanza is pleasantly amusing, but he behaves like a bumptious boy.

Critic Edwin Schallert of the Los Angeles Times wrote:

It is the musical of musicals from a film standpoint—the greatest montage of song ever observed and heard that has emerged from a studio. It is also Mario Lanza in top form as a star, and with every opportunity to display his special gifts to advantage. ... The picture is fabulously staged and costumed, and luxuriantly bedecked with Technicolor photography. It is unquestionably one of the most opulent productions of its type. Metro-Goldwyn-Mayer has achieved a milestone in novelty and thrilling interest that should certainly stir a lagging box office. ... It also is a radiant panorama of operatic scenes, and even though these unfold in kaleidoscopic fashion, with never much lingering on most of the episodes, musically the film carries remarkable impact, because it is toneful in a grand and spectacular film way.

The Great Caruso was an enormous success at Radio City Music Hall in New York, grossing $1,390,943 in ten weeks, the highest in the theater's history at the time. The record stood for ten years until Fanny surpassed the film's gross in 1961.

According to MGM records, the film earned $4,309,000 in theatrical rentals in the U.S. and Canada and $4,960,000 elsewhere, resulting in a profit of $3,977,000. The film was also the most popular at the British box office for 1951.

== Soundtrack ==
RCA Victor issued The Great Caruso record album (although not a true film soundtrack), on the LP, 45 and 78 RPM formats; the album featured eight popular tenor opera arias (four of which were heard in the film, only two in their entirety) sung by Lanza, accompanied by Constantine Callinicos conducting the RCA Victor Orchestra. The album sold 100,000 copies before the film premiered and later became the first operatic LP to sell one million copies. After its original 1951 release, the album remained continuously available on LP until the late 1980s and was reissued on compact disc by RCA Victor in 1989.

== Awards ==
At the 24th Academy Awards ceremony, Douglas Shearer and the MGM sound department won the Academy Award for Best Sound. The Great Caruso also received nominations for its costume design and score.

The film was nominated for inclusion in the AFI's Greatest Movie Musicals list in 2006
