= Sacred Songs for the Holy Year =

Studio album by Enrico Caruso
- Released: 1949
- Recorded: 1912–1920
- Genre: Classical
- Label: RCA Victor

Sacred Songs for the Holy Year is a 1949 album issued by RCA Victor, consisting of three 78 rpm records containing six sacred pieces recorded by the Italian tenor Enrico Caruso.

== Track listing ==
1. Crucifix (Jean-Baptiste Faure) (with Marcel Journet, bass)
2. Agnus Dei (Georges Bizet)
3. Pietà, Signore (Abraham Louis Niedermeyer)
4. Requiem: Ingemisco (Giuseppe Verdi)
5. Petite Messe Solennelle: Domine Deus (Gioachino Rossini)
6. Stabat Mater: Cujus animam (Gioachino Rossini)
