= Nina Morgana =

American opera singer (1891–1986)

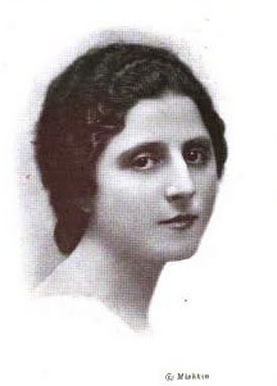
Nina Morgana, from a 1921 publication.

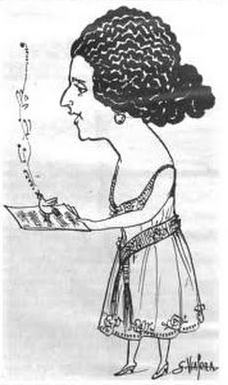
A caricature of Nina Morgana by Giovanni Viafora, from a 1921 publication.

Nina Morgana (November 15, 1891 – July 8, 1986) was an American soprano, a protégée of Enrico Caruso, who sang with the Metropolitan Opera for fifteen seasons, from 1920 to 1935. She was of Italian descent.

== Early life ==
Nina Morgana was born and raised in Buffalo, New York, the daughter of Sicilian immigrants Calogero (Charles) and Concetta Morgana. She was a child performer in the "Venice in America" exhibit at the Pan-American Exposition in 1901. In 1906, she sang at a concert in Buffalo to benefit the survivors of the San Francisco earthquake that year. In 1908, Morgana auditioned for the great operatic tenor Enrico Caruso while he was in Buffalo to perform a concert. Caruso, believing her voice had great potential, sent a letter on her behalf to the retired soprano Teresa Arkel, who accepted the young Morgana as a student at her estate in Milan. Morgana studied voice with Arkel from 1909 to 1913.

The soprano's siblings included Dante J. Morgana, M.D., a prominent eye surgeon based in Buffalo, Charles Morgana, a Ford Motor Company executive selected personally by Henry Ford, and David Morgana, who became a Trappist monk.

== Career ==
During her vocal training in Italy, Teresa Arkel recommended her to conductor Tullio Serafin for the small role of the Forest Bird in a production of Siegfried at the Teatro Dal Verme. She appeared in the premiere of Der Rosenkavalier at La Scala in 1911. From 1917 to 1920, Morgana appeared frequently with Caruso during his North American concert tours. She was with the Chicago Opera in the 1919–1920 season. She sang with the Metropolitan Opera from 1920 to 1935, making her debut as Gilda in Rigoletto. Her other best-known roles at the Met included Amina in La Sonnambula, Nedda in Pagliacci, Musetta in La bohème, and Micaela in Carmen. She also appeared in concert and gave live radio recitals during the 1920s.

In 1926, Morgana sued Chadwick Pictures for a silent film called The Midnight Girl (1925), in which a singer character named "Nina Morgana" is portrayed by actress Dolores Cassinelli as "debauched" and "passé".

== Personal life ==
In June, 1921, Nina Morgana married Bruno Zirato, Caruso's personal secretary and later general manager of the New York Philharmonic, where he also served as personal representative of conductor Arturo Toscanini. Caruso, who was in Italy recuperating from a serious illness when Morgana and Zirato were married, served as best man in absentia at their wedding. Caruso suffered a relapse and died in Naples on August 2, 1921, around seven weeks after the wedding. Bruno Zirato died in November, 1972; Nina Morgana died in Ithaca, New York in July, 1986, at age 94. She was survived by her son, Bruno Zirato Jr. (1922–2008), a television producer with Goodson-Todman Associates.
