= Bruno Zirato Jr. =

American director and producer (1921/1922– 2008)

Bruno Zirato Jr. (1921 or 1922 – 2008) was an American radio director and producer and TV producer.

== Early years ==
Zirato was the son of Bruno Zirato, who was personal secretary to the great operatic tenor Enrico Caruso and later became managing director of the New York Philharmonic; his mother was soprano Nina Morgana. When Bruno Jr. was a child, the Zirato home was frequently visited by "the greats of classical music". He was educated at Collegiate School for Boys in New York City and at Duke University, where he was a member of Phi Beta Kappa. He graduated from Columbia University with a Master of Arts degree.

Zirato chose not to follow in his father's footsteps professionally. "I adored him," the younger Zirato said, "but I couldn't do what he did. I asked him if he knew anyone in broadcast." When his father mentioned CBS executive William S. Paley, Zirato said, "That'll do."

== Career ==
Zirato's career in radio and television began in the 1940s and continued into the 1970s. In 1995 he offered his view of the difference between the two media: "Radio was great fun; television was great work."

=== Radio ===
Zirato began working for CBS in 1943, joining the network as an apprentice script writer. Radio programs that he produced and/or directed included Stage Struck, The Robert Q. Lewis Show, the Mindy Carson Show, Stepping Out, Sing It Again, The Teddy Wilson Show, The Woolworth Hour, Stage Struck, and The Rayburn and Finch Show. He also directed radio simulcasts of the TV programs Songs for Sale and The Show Goes On.

In 1959 CBS Radio tried to institute an economy measure by transplanting its four remaining dramatic series from Hollywood to New York: Yours Truly, Johnny Dollar; Suspense; Gunsmoke; and Have Gun – Will Travel. The plan was finalized in November 1960, when the network kept Gunsmoke in California, discontinued Have Gun – Will Travel, and moved Yours Truly, Johnny Dollar and Suspense to New York. Bruno Zirato Jr. was chosen to produce and direct the New York programs, and he continued in these capacities until both series ended in 1962.

=== Television ===
From 1962 to 1977, Zirato was the producer of To Tell the Truth, with duties that included briefing and quizzing the two impostors who attempted to convince the show's panelists of their own veracity. Before each episode was recorded, he spent a day and a half with the people who would challenge the celebrity panel to determine which one was the actual businessman, politician, etc. The sessions included reviewing the "mechanics of the game" and ensuring that the impostors could "lie with assurance".

Zirato appeared on camera in one memorable episode of To Tell the Truth in 1973, where he stood alongside game-show personalities Peggy Cass and Soupy Sales as one of the three contestants with an interesting story. The affidavit claimed that one of these people had recently judged a world-championship chicken-plucking contest in Spring Hill, Florida. Three panelists questioned the contestants, but two guessed wrong. Only one of the panelists reasoned, with tongue in cheek, that the event's host would not have the money to afford celebrity judges, but could more reasonably invite Zirato. Zirato was indeed the one telling the truth.

=== Critical comments ===
Jack Gould, critic for The New York Times, complimented Zirato's work with sound on a broadcast of the TV show The Seven Lively Arts. Gould noted that Zirato was brought in to work with the sound on an episode about jazz that featured Duke Ellington, Billie Holiday, and other artists of that genre. Zirato and Sam Kane, the regular sound engineer, "were treated as full artistic partners" and "were afforded extended rehearsal time in which to achieve maximum aural effectiveness" as they managed more than 20 microphones. Gould contrasted "the vitality and depth of the sound" with the usual situation in which sound was "probably the most neglected aspect of the video art."

A review of the radio program Stage Struck said, "within the limitations of the program's budget an unusually good job of producing and directing was done by Howard Barnes and Bruno Zirato Jr."

== Later years ==
In the mid-1960s Zirato was diagnosed with multiple sclerosis. After To Tell the Truth went off the air, he moved to Arizona. He said, "I couldn't afford my New York apartment anymore." His illness limited his opportunities for employment as he realized that "People don't give you a job when you have a cane." He found some work with marketing firms in the Phoenix, Arizona, area before he retired.

== Personal life ==
Zirato described himself as having "an epidermal knowledge of everything ... because I'm always reading. Even in the bathroom. Dictionaries, encyclopedias, The Times, The Trib." He married Barbara Keefe, on September 17, 1949, and they had two children. Zirato died on November 24, 2008, at the age of 86.
