= Simonelli =

Simonelli is an Italian surname. Notable people with the surname include:

- Alberto Simonelli (born 1967), Italian Paralympic archer
- Damon Simonelli (1959–2004), American planetary scientist
- Giorgio Simonelli (1901–1966), Italian film director, editor, screenwriter and journalist
- Giovanni Simonelli (born 1952), Italian football manager
- Giuseppe Simonelli (c. 1650–1710), Italian Baroque painter
- Pasquale Simonelli (1878–1960), Italian-American banker
- Virginio Simonelli (born 1985), Italian singer
- Vittorio Simonelli (1860–1929), Italian geologist and paleontologist

== See also ==
- 8071 Simonelli, a main-belt asteroid
