= Dorothy Caruso =

Wife of Enrico Caruso, writer

Dorothy Park Benjamin Caruso
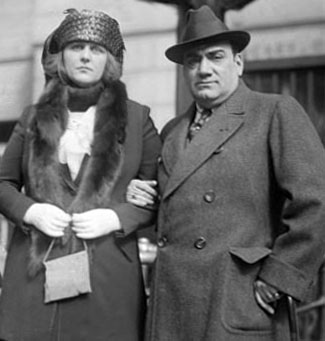
- Dorothy and Enrico Caruso, 1918
- Born: Dorothy Park Benjamin; August 6, 1893; Hastings-on-Hudson, New York
- Died: December 16, 1955 (aged 62); Baltimore, Maryland
- Resting place: Druid Ridge Cemetery, Baltimore County, Maryland
- Occupation: Writer
- Spouses: Enrico Caruso (m. 1918; died 1921) Ernest Augustus Ingram (m. 1923; div. 1925) Charles Adam Holder (m. 1933; div. 1940)
- Partner: Margaret C. Anderson (1942)
- Children: 2
- Relatives: Park Benjamin (father)

Dorothy Park Benjamin Caruso (August 6, 1893 – December 16, 1955) was an American socialite and the wife of the Italian operatic tenor Enrico Caruso.

== Life ==
Born Dorothy Park Benjamin on August 6, 1893, in Hastings-on-Hudson, New York, she was the daughter of Park Benjamin, a wealthy lawyer and author, and Ida Crane. Dorothy had two sisters and two brothers.

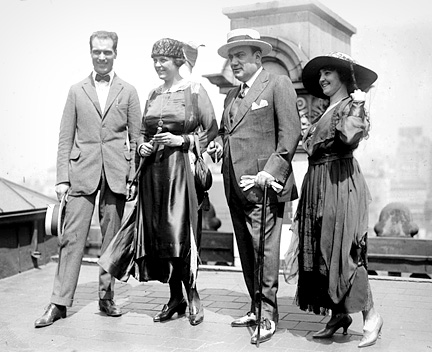
Caruso's wedding party on the roof of the Knickerbocker Hotel in New York City, 20 August 1918. Left to right: Bruno Zirato (Caruso's secretary), Dorothy Caruso, Enrico Caruso, Mrs. J. S. Keith.

On August 20, 1918, Benjamin married Enrico Caruso, with whom she had a daughter, Gloria Caruso (1919–1999). After Enrico Caruso's death on August 2, 1921, Dorothy married Captain Ernest Augustus Ingram (1892–1954) in 1923, divorcing in 1925. Their daughter, Jacqueline, was born in September 1924. In 1933, she married Charles Adam Holder (1872–1955), divorcing in 1940. She reverted to the surname "Caruso" following the dissolution of both marriages.

In 1942, Dorothy Caruso met Margaret C. Anderson, on a voyage to the United States, with whom she lived until her death in 1955.

Dorothy Caruso died of cancer in Baltimore, Maryland on December 16, 1955, at the age of 62. She was interred in Druid Ridge Cemetery, Baltimore County, Maryland.

== Books ==
Dorothy Caruso wrote two biographies of her husband: Wings Of Song: The Story Of Caruso published in 1928, and Enrico Caruso: His Life and Death published in 1945. The latter book was a bestseller and the basis for the screenplay of the 1951 Metro-Goldwyn-Mayer motion picture The Great Caruso, starring Mario Lanza in the title role. Dorothy Caruso was portrayed in the film by Ann Blyth.

Her autobiography, Dorothy Caruso: A Personal History, was published in 1952.
