= Bruno Zirato =

Italian-American music manager (1884-1972)

Bruno Zirato (September 27, 1884 - November 28, 1972) was an Italian immigrant to the United States who became the personal secretary to famous operatic tenor Enrico Caruso, personal manager to various singers and conductors, and was the managing director of the New York Philharmonic.

== Early years ==
Zirato was born in Italy on September 27, 1884 and he became an American citizen. He was a journalist before he moved into the music-related career for which he became known. He worked for the Il Giornale d'Italia newspaper in Rome, Italy. In 1912, he went to Paris, intending to study journalism at the Sorbonne (a move that his father opposed). An American physician whom Zirato met in Paris persuaded him to go to the United States, stressing financial opportunities that America provided. They traveled on a steamer to New York City, checked into a hotel and made plans to have dinner together. When dinnertime arrived, Zirato found that the doctor had left for his home in Kansas City. With limited funds and a limited knowledge of English, Zirato survived financially by working for the Italian-language newspaper Araldo Italiano, teaching people Italian, and coaching singers regarding pronunciation. He also taught Italian in New York University's summer school and lectured on Italian literature.

== Career ==
In 1915, Zirato and Enrico Caruso met at a wartime fundraising event. They became friends, and Caruso soon hired Zirato as his personal secretary. Dorothy Caruso, who married the tenor in 1918, wrote of Zirato in her 1945 biography of her husband: "Zirato wasn't a trained secretary. No professional could have held the position for a day, for although he was highly paid, he had no time to himself, no regular hours. He had to do anything Enrico asked and at any time, regardless of his personal feelings."

After Caruso's death in 1921, Zirato became business manager of Musical Digest, a position that he held from 1922 to 1928. During that period he also was the New York representative of the opera houses Teatro Colón and La Scala and the opera companies in Los Angeles and San Francisco.

Zirato became the personal manager for many opera singers, including Grace Moore, Ezio Pinza, and Lily Pons, and for conductors. His influence and managerial responsibilities expanded in 1936 when he became vice president of Columbia Artists Management. He retired from that position in 1956.

=== New York Philharmonic ===
Zirato's association with the New York Philharmonic began in 1927, "when it was decided that the orchestra needed an Italian-speaking liaison to smooth dealings with its tempestuous principal conductor, Arturo Toscanini." His title was Special Representative of the Philharmonic-Symphony Society of New York for Toscanini. A 1931 newspaper article reported, "During the past two seasons Bruno Zirato has been literally the shadow of Arturo Toscanini. Wherever Toscanini has gone, there has gone Bruno." Zirato and Toscanini remained friends until Toscanini's death in 1957.

In 1931, Zirato became the philharmonic's associate manager. He was appointed co-manager with Arthur Judson in 1947, and was named managing director following Judson's retirement in 1956. Zirato resigned from that position in 1959, at which time he was named adviser to the group's board of directors, retaining that position for the rest of his life.

During Zirato's tenure with the philharmonic, the orchestra toured Europe in 1930 and North America in 1955, after which there was a tour of Britain and other parts of Europe. While Zirato was co-manager and managing director, the philharmonic's financial status improved and attendance increased.

== Personal life and death ==
On June 15, 1921, Zirato married soprano Nina Morgana in Buffalo, New York. They had a son, Bruno Zirato Jr. Zirato died on November 28, 1972, in Columbia-Presbyterian Medical Center, aged 88. He was buried in Far Ridge Cemetery in Chappaqua, New York.

== Book ==
Zirato and Pierre V. R. Key wrote the book Enrico Caruso, a Biography.

== In popular culture ==
Zirato was portrayed by Vincenzo Amato in Bradley Cooper's 2023 film Maestro.
