= Teresa Arkel =

Austrian opera singer

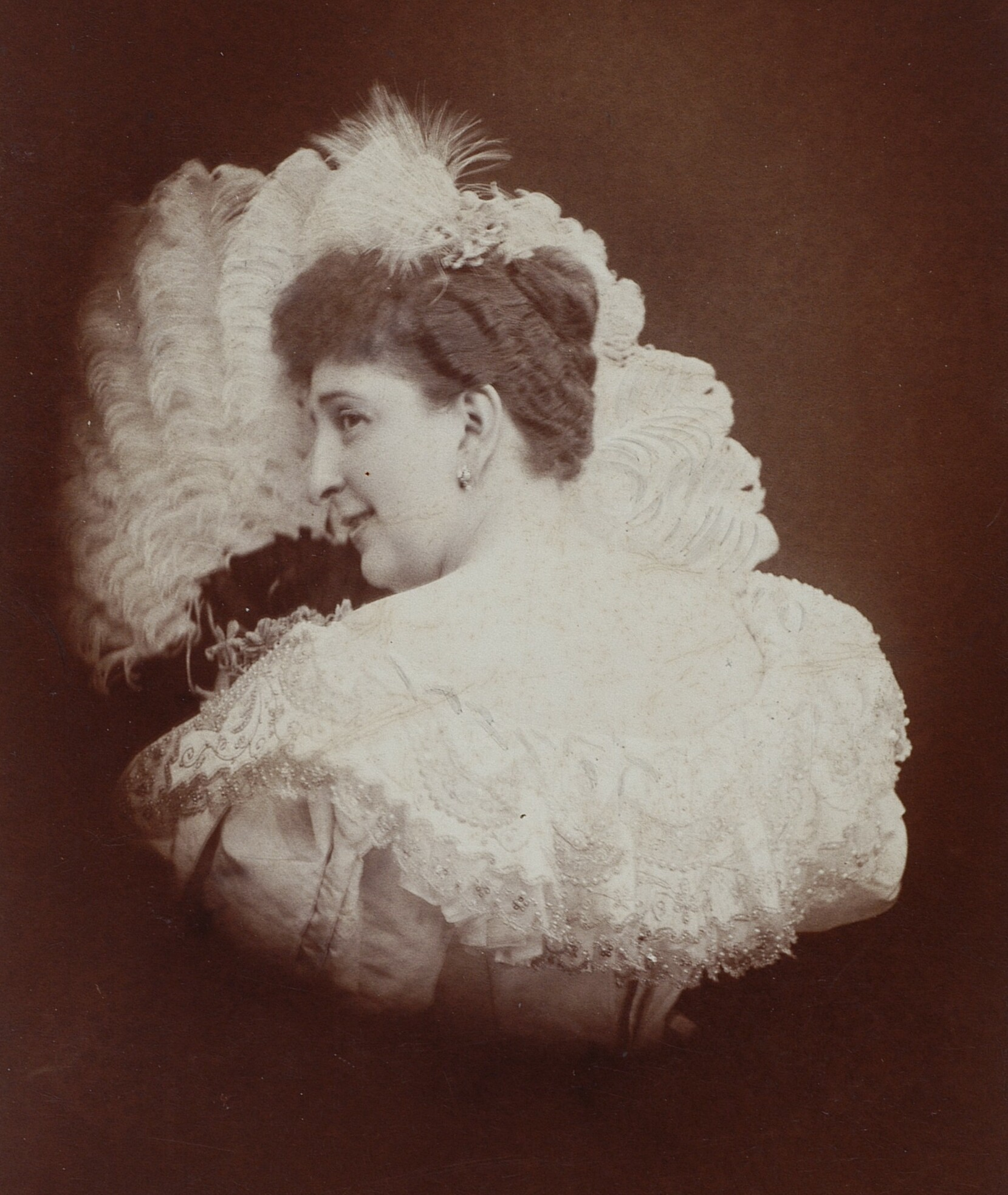
- Teresa Arkel, from about 1896
- Born: Therese Blumenfeld; 1861; Lemberg, Kingdom of Galicia and Lodomeria, Austrian Empire
- Died: July 1929 (aged 67–68); Milan, Kingdom of Italy
- Occupations: Opera vocalist, voice teacher

Teresa Arkel (1861 – July 1929), born Therese Blumenfeld, was a Ukrainian-born, Austrian-trained opera singer, based in Milan.

== Early life ==
Therese Blumenfeld was born in Lemberg, now Lviv, Ukraine in 1861. Her family was Jewish. Her father, Emanuel Blumenfeld, was a prominent lawyer and community leader. After training at the Lviv Conservatory, she continued vocal studies privately in Vienna with Luise Meyer-Dustmann. Her nephew was radiologist Paul Lazarus.

== Career ==
Arkel, a dramatic soprano known for her impressive range and technique, began her career on the concert stage in Lviv in 1883. She made her operatic debut in 1884, in Les Huguenots. In 1885 she was on the opera stage in Warsaw, appearing in Aida, Il trovatore, and L'Africaine. She sang throughout Europe, from Bilbao and Paris to Prague and Budapest. In 1890 she was the first to perform the lead role in Emilio Serrano's Doña Juana la Loca, in Madrid. She also sang in Buenos Aires, in 1894, in Otello and Lohengrin. In 1898, she was the first to perform the lead role in Zygmunt Noskowski's Livia Quintilla, in her hometown.

After her stage career, she became a prominent voice teacher in Milan and made several recordings between 1903 and 1905. Her students included Phyllis Wolfe, Tina Desana, Nina Gale, Inez Wilson, and Nina Morgana.

== Personal life ==
Therese Blumenfeld married Sigmund Arkel. They had two children. Arkel died in Milan in 1929, in her late sixties. Her voice was included on The Record of Singing, a compilation of early recordings published in 1977.
