= Pasqual Mario Marafioti =

American physician and vocal coach (1878–1951)

Pasqual Mario Marafioti was a physician and laryngologist for the Metropolitan Opera. He gave up his medical practice in 1930 and became a vocal coach for Metro pictures. There he coached Enrico Caruso as well as Marion Bell. He was also Caruso's personal physician.

Marafioti became famous for studying Enrico Caruso's voice while coaching him. He subsequently published the book Caruso's Method of Voice Production: The Scientific Culture of the Voice in 1922, shortly after Caruso's death. Caruso's Method of Voice Production is a detailed and scientific explanation of Caruso's natural and unique singing style. The book focuses on physiological methods of voice production. Although this method of voice production was natural to Caruso, Marafioti believed this scientific method can be taught to other students of singing. The book emphasizes on the speaking voice as according to the author singing is merely speaking in musical rhythm.
