= Marcel Journet =

French opera singer

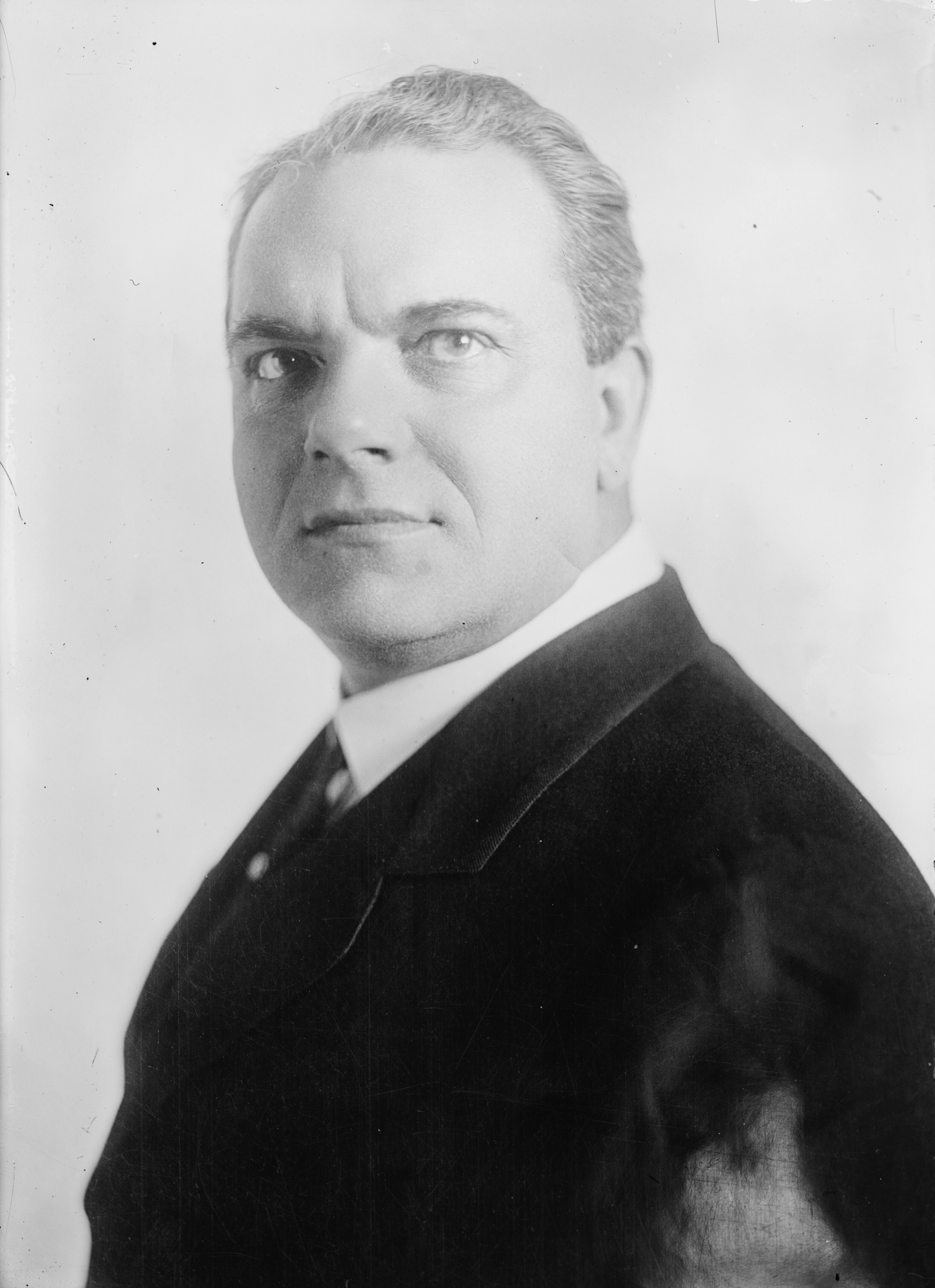

Background information
- Born: 25 July 1868; Grasse, Alpes-Maritimes, France
- Origin: France
- Died: 7 September 1933 (aged 65) Vittel, France
- Genre: Opera
- Occupation: Singer

Marcel Journet (25 July 1868 – 7 September 1933), was a French operatic bass. He enjoyed a prominent career in England, France and Italy, and appeared at the foremost American opera houses in New York City and Chicago.

== Biography ==
Journet was born in the town of Grasse, Alpes-Maritimes, and studied at the Paris Conservatory. He made his operatic debut at Montpellier in 1891. Journet went on to sing a wide range of roles in operas by Richard Wagner and major French and Italian composers during a distinguished, 40-year career.

The Royal Opera House at London's Covent Garden, Milan's La Scala, the Paris Opera and the New York Metropolitan Opera, were some of the famous venues graced by Journet's presence during the first quarter of the 20th century. Arturo Toscanini was just one of the celebrated conductors under whose baton he performed. His on-stage colleagues included such renowned singers as Nellie Melba, Luisa Tetrazzini, Enrico Caruso, Giovanni Martinelli, Titta Ruffo, Giuseppe De Luca and Feodor Chaliapin. While at the Met, he took part in the controversial 1903 performance of Wagner's last Opera, Parsifal.

Journet died in Vittel, of kidney failure, aged 66.

Many recordings of his voice have been re-issued on various CDs, most notably on the Marston and Preiser labels.
