= Park Benjamin Jr. =

American lawyer

- Park Benjamin Jr, as a US Naval academy midshipman
- Born: Park Benjamin; May 11, 1849; New York City, United States
- Died: August 21, 1922 (aged 73); Stamford, Connecticut
- Education: United States Naval Academy, 1867; Albany Law School, 1870; Union College (PhD), 1877
- Occupations: Editor, writer, illustrator, patent attorney, consultant
- Spouses: Helen Campbell, Isabel Torrens, Ida Crane
- Writing career
- Language: English
- Genres: Magazines, non-fiction, fiction
- Subjects: United States Naval Academy, electricity, mechanics, science in general
- Notable work: History of the United States Naval Academy

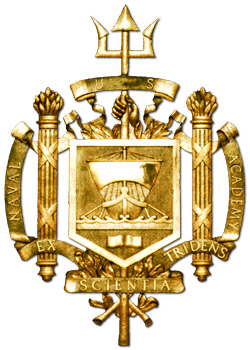
United States Naval academy seal designed by Park Benjamin

Park Benjamin (1849–1922) was an American patent lawyer and writer. He was born in New York City, graduated at the United States Naval Academy in 1867, resigned from the Navy in 1869, and graduated at the Albany Law School in the following year. He was associate editor of The Scientific American from 1872 to 1878 and subsequently edited Appleton's Cyclopedia of Applied Mechanics and Cyclopædia of Modern Mechanism. He is also famous as the father-in-law of operatic tenor Enrico Caruso.

== Early life ==
Park Benjamin Jr. was born in New York in 1849. His father, Park Benjamin Sr., was extremely famous in his time, as a poet, editor and founder of several newspapers.

Park Benjamin graduated from the U.S. Naval Academy in 1867, and published a book of his etchings of the academy that year. He resigned from the Navy, and after a year at law school was admitted to the New York Bar in 1870. He studied science at Union College and received his Ph.D. in 1877. Before completing his doctorate he was assistant editor of Scientific American (1872–78) and then editor-in-chief of Appleton's Cyclopaedia of Applied Mechanics (1879–96). By the time Benjamin began working at Scientific American it had become more associated with the commercial side of science and patenting of inventions. He was editor when Thomas Edison brought in his phonograph to the patent agency, and its uses were for the first time described in an 1877 issue. Both Edison and younger brother Dr. George Benjamin were contributors to Appleton's when P.B. began editing.

== 37 Park Row ==
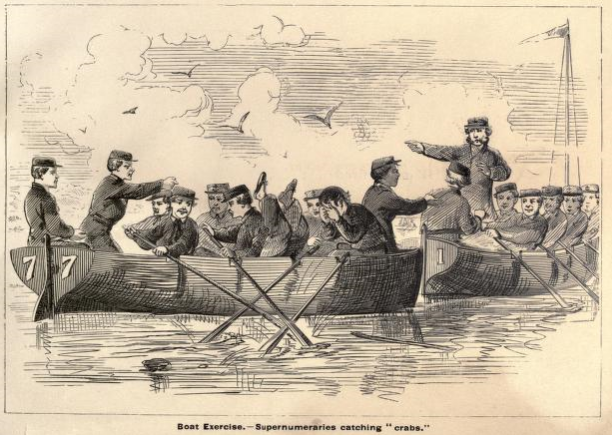
Boat Exercise.—Supernumeraries catching 'crabs'. —from Shakings, Benjamin's book of Naval Academy etchings. Each sketch was accompanied by a quotation, usually poetic. For this image he chose: "The oars were silver, Which, to the tune of flutes, kept stroke, and made the water, which they beat, to follow faster, as amorous of their strokes". The lines, unattributed in the book, are from Shakespeare's Antony and Cleopatra.

Between those editorships Benjamin established, at 37 Park Row, a "Scientific Expert Office" that offered advertising and promotional help, as well as metallurgical and chemical expertise for inventors and manufacturers. Benjamin wrote three books on the history of electricity, one on the Voltaic cell, and one on the U.S. Naval Academy. Like the later Scientific American editor John Bernard Walker, he was very interested in the Navy and in coastal defenses, the northeast coast particularly. According to the Who's Who, he made quite an impression with his 1881 story "The End of New York", meant to warn of the navy's inadequacy. It features balloons that can float over targets and release bombs; he had written an article warning about the dangers of balloon weapons one year earlier. That creative method of siege had been used first by Austria against the rebellious Venetians in 1849; the balloon bombs had been successful and their use had been reported in Scientific American at the time. Who knows why Benjamin saw it as a threat to New York thirty years later? "The subject is woefully trite", wrote the Nassau Literary Magazine when the story was reprinted in 1885, "the plot is extremely simple ... Its interest is derived solely from its novelty."

== Debut as a writer of fiction ==
Benjamin's story, The End of New York may seem slow, and sometimes thick in Naval detail, but it is a unique origin point in American fiction. It was the first story in the mode of George Chesney's The Battle of Dorking (1871); at least six other stories in this collection fall in that category, and Benjamin's predates the next by seven years. These stories are defined by describing an imaginary invasion, having a clear purpose to expose the weaknesses of the author's home country defenses, and showing how those defenses could be improved. Many of these invasion stories use famous contemporaries as characters, but Benjamin's story is the only one that kills off some of these real people, like Captain Greer, Lieutenant-Commander Jewell and Vice-Admiral Rowan (at the end of Chapter II). His work is the first New York story to describe specific buildings toppling into the streets, and the ruin of the city and mass evacuation in its gory detail.

== Turbulent family relations ==
In 1918, Benjamin's daughter Dorothy, 25, eloped with opera star Enrico Caruso, who was 45. Caruso was the most famous tenor in the world at the time. Benjamin initially approved of the marriage but later withdrew his consent citing the differences in their "ages, nationality and temperament." Dorothy's older sister also married that year and Benjamin was conspicuously absent from her wedding as well.

In 1919, Benjamin legally adopted Dorothy's long time governess, Anna M. Bolchi, as his daughter. His wife was ill and living in a sanitarium at the time. Enrico Caruso died in 1921 at the age of 48 and Benjamin died the next year at the age of 74 at his summer home in Stamford, Connecticut. All of his children, except Dorothy, were at his bedside when he died.

Benjamin left each of his biological children one dollar in his will. Anna Bolchi, an Italian immigrant, had been left the bulk of Benjamin's estate, valued at around $500,000. The text of Benjamin's will was printed in the newspapers with its scathing comments on the children. "Because of their long continued, persistent, undutiful and unfilial conduct" they had "acted less as children than as parasites and who have defied me." Benjamin's widow died in the sanitarium at age 56, just three weeks after his death, leaving Bolchi in total control of the estate. The children then sued to contest the will on several counts, but dropped the suit six months later, after Bolchi offered a financial settlement. A year after his death, Bolchi scattered Benjamin's ashes in the exact center of the Atlantic ocean, as per his wishes. A few months later in London, Bolchi married Benjamin's lawyer, Benjamin Fullman. Suspiciously, the lawyer had drawn up both Benjamin's will and the adoption of his future wife.

== Publications ==
Beside items listed here, Benjamin wrote numerous magazine articles dealing for the most part with scientific subjects.

- Shakings or Etchings from the United States Naval Academy (1867)
- Wrinkles and Recipes (1875); 5th edition, 1894
- "The End of New York" (1881) – invasion story
- The Age of Electricity (1886)
- The Voltaic Cell (1892)
- The History of Electricity (1895)
- History of the United States Naval Academy (1900)
- Modern Mechanism (1905)
