= Pasquale Simonelli =

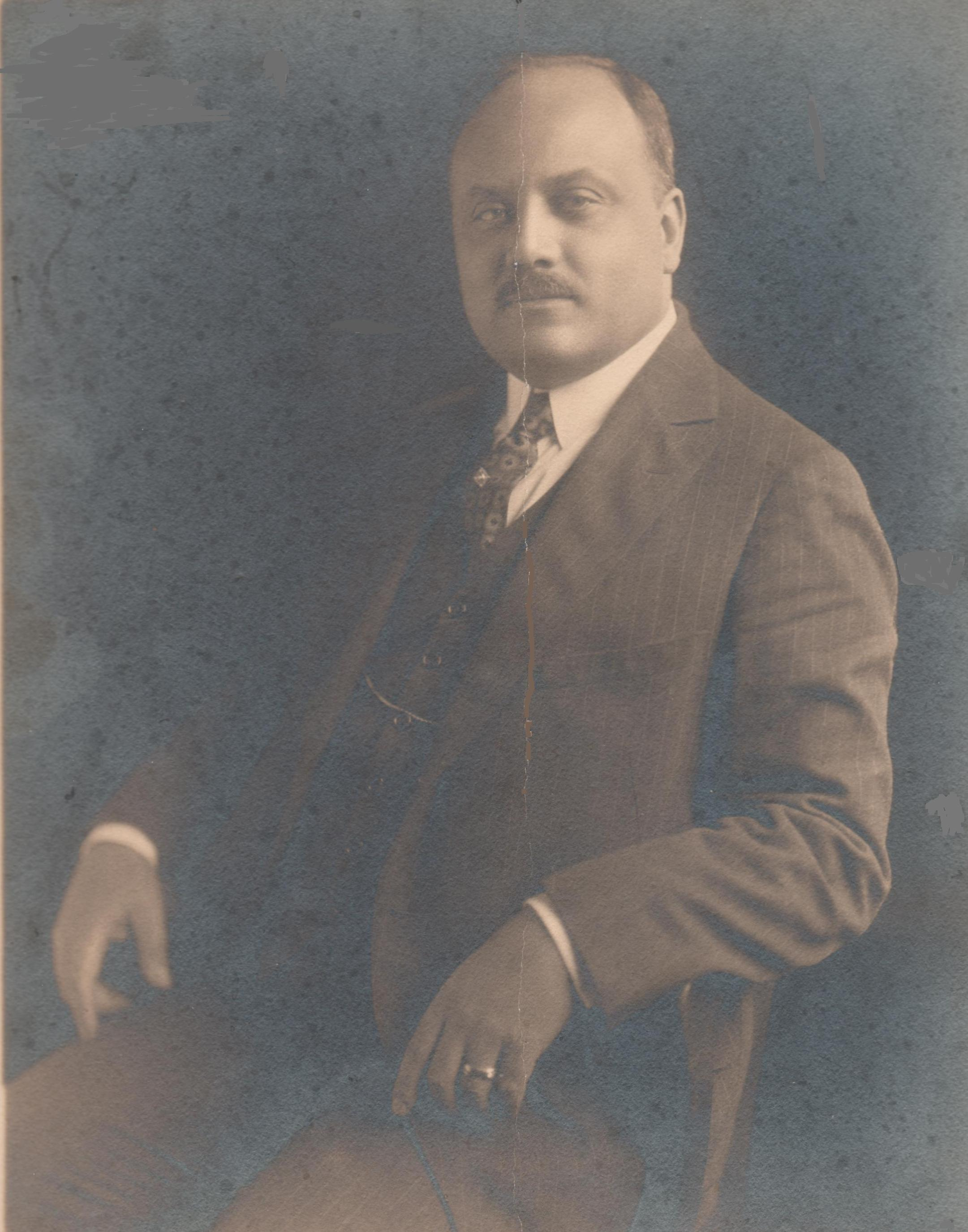
Pasquale Isidoro Simonelli, 1935.

Pasquale Isidoro Simonelli (May 4, 1878 – September 14, 1960), Commander (Commendatore) of the Order of the Crown of Italy, was an Italian-American banker.

== Biography ==
Born in Saviano, province of Naples, Simonelli was educated at the Normal School of Naples and, at first, he worked as a bank clerk in that city.

In 1897, on the ship Oregon, he sailed from Naples, Italy and, on February 10, arrived in New York City. Here he began to teach Italian Language. In 1898–99, he worked as a librarian at St. Xavier College, New York City. In 1899, under Comm. Joseph N. Francolini, Mr. Simonelli started his banking career as a clerk with the Italian Savings Bank of New York City. The following year he was appointed secretary of the bank and in 1901, trustee. In 1902, he became a U.S. citizen and joined the Republican Party.

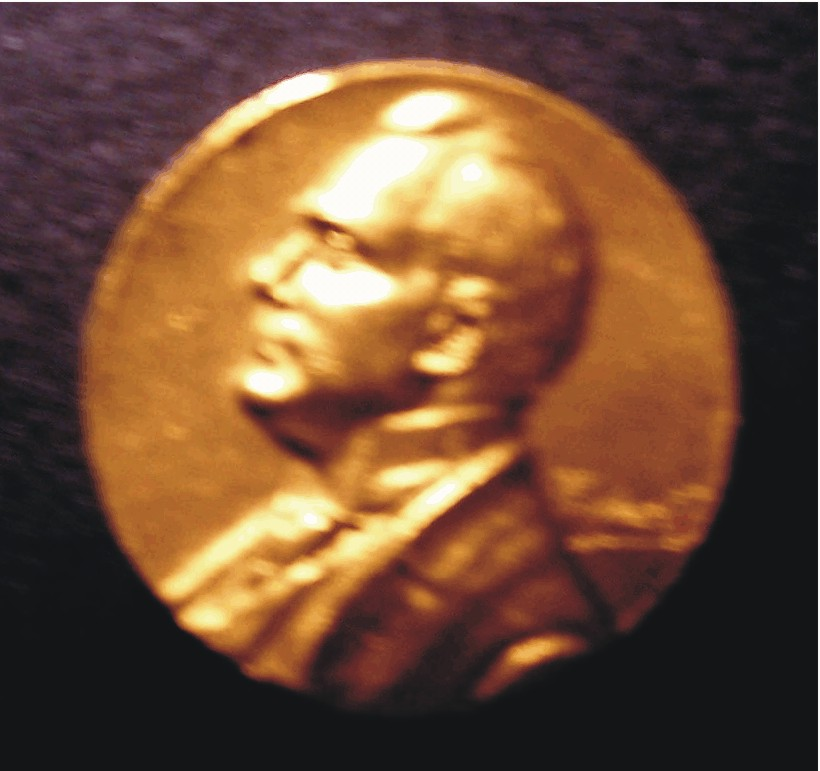
The medal that Enrico Caruso gave to Pasquale Simonelli, his New York impresario
Obverse:
Caruso facing left.
Lower right:
Salanto, medal maker’s signature.

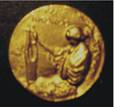
Reverse:
Music Muse with lira on the left,
over PER RICORDO (memento).

In 1903, Simonelli was instrumental in securing the services of Enrico Caruso for the New York Metropolitan Opera. Throughout his life, he continued to engage other famous opera singers, such as Maria Barrientos, Beniamino Gigli, Titta Ruffo, Riccardo Stracciari, and others for the New York Metropolitan Opera.

Simonelli married Rosa in 1903 and had two children: Julius (born in 1904 in their summer home on Brighton Ave, Long Branch, New Jersey) and Maria.

From 1920 to 1932, Mr. Simonelli was President of the Italian Savings Bank. The King of Italy, Victor Emmanuel III, conferred upon him the honour of Commander (Commendatore) of the Order of the Crown of Italy. From 1922 to 1930, Simonelli was Treasurer and Director of the Italian Chamber of Commerce and Treasurer of the Italian Hospital of New York City. During those years he was also vice president of the Comitato pro Sacco and Vanzetti. In 1926, he was Director and organizer of the Seward National Bank. From 1927 to 1934, he was also Director of the Italian Super-Power Co. When, in 1932, the Italian Savings Bank and the East River Bank merged, giving birth to a new Institution named East River Savings Bank in New York City, Simonelli was appointed Vice-President and Trustee of this Bank with his Office at 225 Lafayette Street. He resided in New York City at 326 W. 89th St. until 1936.

In 1937 Simonelli retired to Italy, at his castle “Villa Simonelli” in San Paolo Belsito, Naples. There, he spent the rest of his life as a country gentleman. He died in 1960. His remains rest in the Simonelli family mausoleum in the cemetery of Sant'Erasmo in Saviano, Naples.

== Bibliography ==
- Campbell Dorcas Elisabeth,The First Hundred Years. The Chronicle of a Mutual Savings Bank, East River Savings Bank New York, 1949, pp. 67–69, 94.
- Cannistraro, Philip V., Mussolini, Sacco-Vanzetti, and the Anarchists: The Transatlantic Context, The Journal of Modern History, Vol. 68, No. 1 (Mar., 1996), p. 51 n. 78.
- Il Mattino, Italiani che onorano la Patria all'Estero. Superbo avvenire delle aziende idro-elettriche. L'attività prodigiosa del comm. Pasquale Simonelli, La Cronaca del Mezzogiorno, 15-16 Febbraio 1928.
- Il Progresso italo americano, Il banchiere che portò Caruso negli USA, sezione B - supplemento illustrato della domenica, New York, 27 luglio 1986.
- Italian-American Who’s-Who. A Biographical Dictionary of outstanding Italo-Americans and Italian Residents of the United States, Volume One, Published by The Vigo Press, 2 Rector Street, New York City, 1935, pp. 266–267.
- Italian Savings Bank, Italian Savings Bank. Cartered 1896, New York City, 1920?
- Jackson Stanley, Caruso, First edition, New York, Stein and Day, 1972, pp. 99, 106, 110, 124.
- Key Pierre V. R., Zirato B., Enrico Caruso. A Biography, Boston, Little, Brown, and Company, 1922, pp. 170–172, 175, 179, 181, 206,207.
- Simonelli, Pasquale (2012), Enrico Caruso Unedited Notes, Charleston, SC.: S.E.A.O. Inc. http://amzn.com/0615714900
