= Emilio De Marchi =

Emilio De Marchi may refer to:

- Emilio De Marchi (writer) (1851–1901), Italian novelist
- Emilio De Marchi (tenor) (1861–1917), Italian operatic tenor
- Emilio De Marchi (actor) (born 1959), Italian actor
