= Enrico Caruso =

Italian opera tenor (1873–1921)

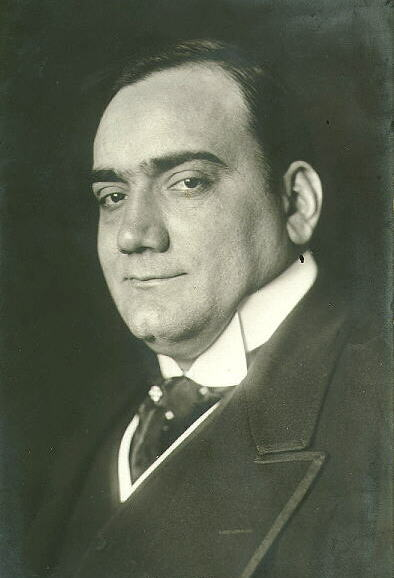
- Caruso, c. 1910
- Born: 25 February 1873; Naples, Kingdom of Italy
- Died: 2 August 1921 (aged 48); Naples, Kingdom of Italy
- Resting place: Santa Maria del Pianto Cemetery, Naples
- Occupations: Lyric tenor; dramatic tenor
- Years active: 1895–1920
- Spouse: Dorothy Park Benjamin (m. 1918)
- Partner: Ada Giachetti (1898–1908)
- Children: Rodolfo Caruso (1898-1951); Enrico Caruso Jr. (1904-1987); Gloria Caruso (1919-1999)

Enrico Caruso (Note: English: /kəˈruːzoʊ/ kə-ROO-zoh, US also /kəˈruːsoʊ/ kə-ROO-soh, Italian: [enˈriːko kaˈruːzo].) (25 February 1873 – 2 August 1921) was an Italian operatic tenor, who sang to great acclaim at the major opera houses of Europe and the Americas, appearing in a wide variety of roles that ranged from the lyric to the dramatic. Generally recognized as the preeminent tenor of the 20th century and the first international recording star, Caruso made around 250 commercially released recordings between 1902 and 1920.

== Biography ==
=== Early life ===
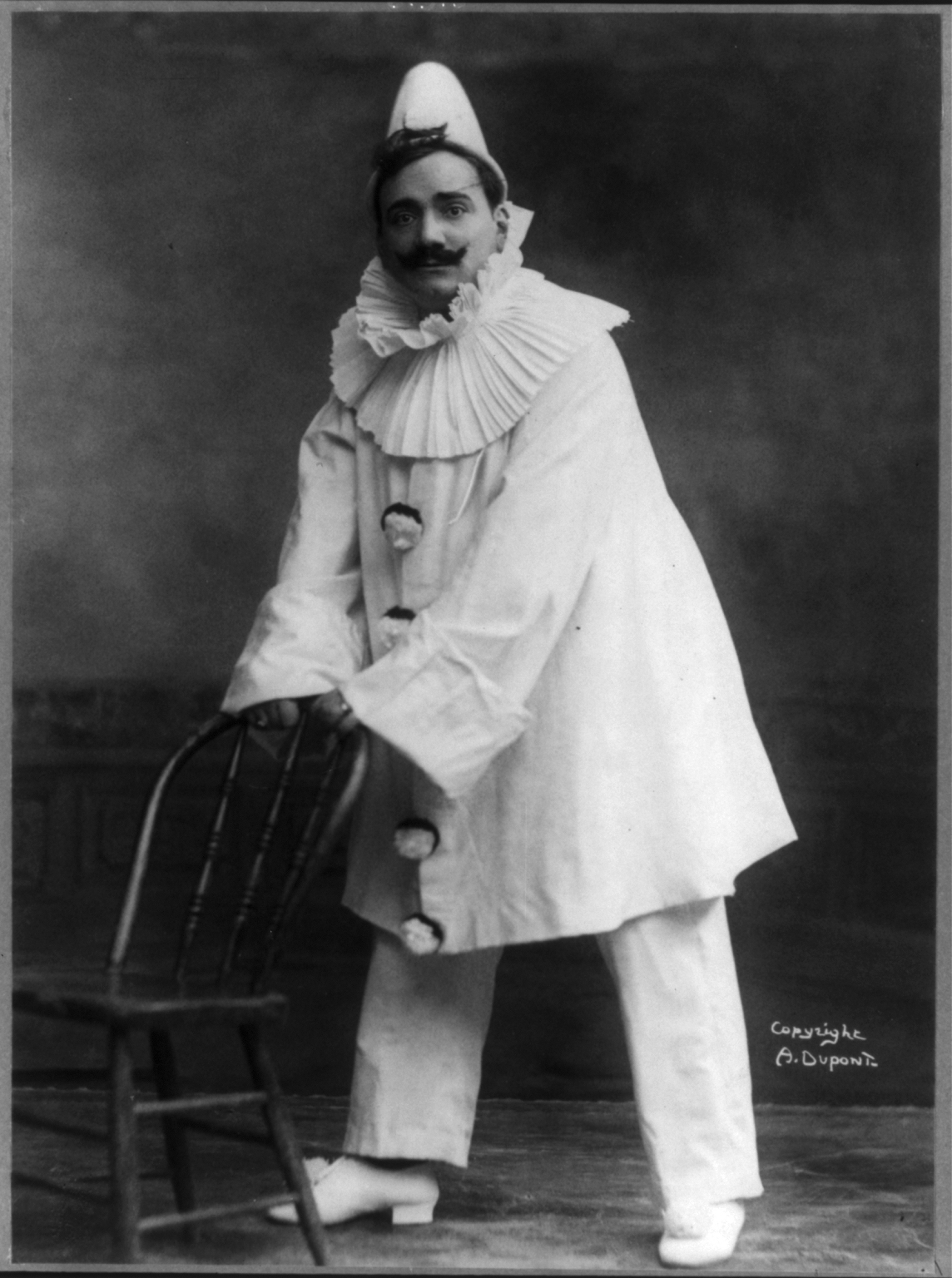
Caruso in his signature role as Canio in Pagliacci, 1908

Caruso was born in Naples in the via Santi Giovanni e Paolo n° 7 on 25 February 1873. He was baptised the next day in the adjacent Church of San Giovanni e Paolo. His parents originally came from Piedimonte d'Alife (now called Piedimonte Matese), in the Province of Caserta in Campania, Southern Italy.

Caruso was the third of seven children and one of only three to survive infancy. For decades, it was widely reported that Caruso's parents had 21 children, 18 of whom died in infancy. However, based on genealogical research (amongst others conducted by Caruso family friend Guido D'Onofrio), biographers Pierre Key, Francis Robinson, and Enrico Caruso Jr. and Andrew Farkas, have proven this to be untrue. Caruso himself and his brother Giovanni may have been the source of the exaggerated number. Caruso's widow Dorothy also included the story in her best-selling memoir about her husband, published in 1945. She allegedly quoted the tenor, speaking of his mother, Anna Caruso (née Baldini): "She had twenty-one children. Twenty boys and one girl – too many. I am number nineteen boy."

The Caruso family was poor, but not destitute. Marcellino Caruso, the tenor's father, was a mechanic and foundry worker. Initially, Marcellino thought his son should adopt the same trade, and at the age of 11, the boy was apprenticed to a mechanical engineer who constructed and maintained public water fountains. Whenever visiting Naples in future years, Caruso liked to point out a certain fountain that he had helped to install. Caruso later worked alongside his father at the Meuricoffre factory in Naples. At his mother's insistence, he also attended school for a time, receiving a basic education under the tutelage of a local priest. He learned to write in a strikingly handsome script and studied technical draftsmanship. At this time, he sang in a church choir, and his voice showed enough promise for him to contemplate a possible career in music.

Caruso was encouraged in his early musical ambitions by his mother, who died in 1888. To help support his family, he worked as a street singer in Naples and performed at cafes and soirées. In 1894, his progress as a paid entertainer was interrupted, however, by 45 days of compulsory military service, which was completed for him by his brother, Giovanni. Caruso resumed his vocal studies upon being discharged from the army.

=== Early career ===
On 15 March 1895, Caruso made his professional stage debut at age 22, appearing at the Teatro Nuovo in Naples in the now-forgotten opera, L'Amico Francesco, by the amateur composer Mario Morelli. A string of further engagements in provincial opera houses followed, and he received instruction from the conductor and voice teacher Vincenzo Lombardi that improved his high notes and polished his style. Three other prominent Neapolitan singers taught by Lombardi were the baritones Antonio Scotti and Pasquale Amato, both of whom would go on to partner Caruso at the Metropolitan Opera and the tenor Fernando De Lucia, who would also appear at the Met and later sing at Caruso's funeral.

Money continued to be in short supply for the young Caruso. One of his first publicity photographs, taken on a visit to Sicily in 1896, depicts him wearing a bedspread draped like a toga since his sole dress shirt was away being laundered.

During the final few years of the 19th century, Caruso performed at a succession of theatres throughout Italy until 1900, when he was rewarded with a contract to sing at La Scala. His La Scala debut occurred on 26 December of that year in the part of Rodolfo in Giacomo Puccini's La bohème with Arturo Toscanini conducting. Audiences in Monte Carlo, Warsaw and Buenos Aires also heard Caruso sing during this pivotal phase of his career and, in 1899–1900, he appeared before the Tsar and the Russian aristocracy at the Mariinsky Theatre in Saint Petersburg and the Bolshoi Theatre in Moscow as part of a touring company of first-class Italian singers.

The first major operatic role that Caruso created was Federico in Francesco Cilea's L'arlesiana (1897); then he was Loris in Umberto Giordano's Fedora (1898) at the Teatro Lirico, Milan. At that same theatre, he created the role of Maurizio in Francesco Cilea's Adriana Lecouvreur (1902). Puccini considered casting the young Caruso in the role of Cavaradossi in Tosca at its premiere in January 1900, but ultimately chose the older, more established Emilio De Marchi instead. Caruso appeared in the role later that year and Puccini stated that Caruso sang the part better.

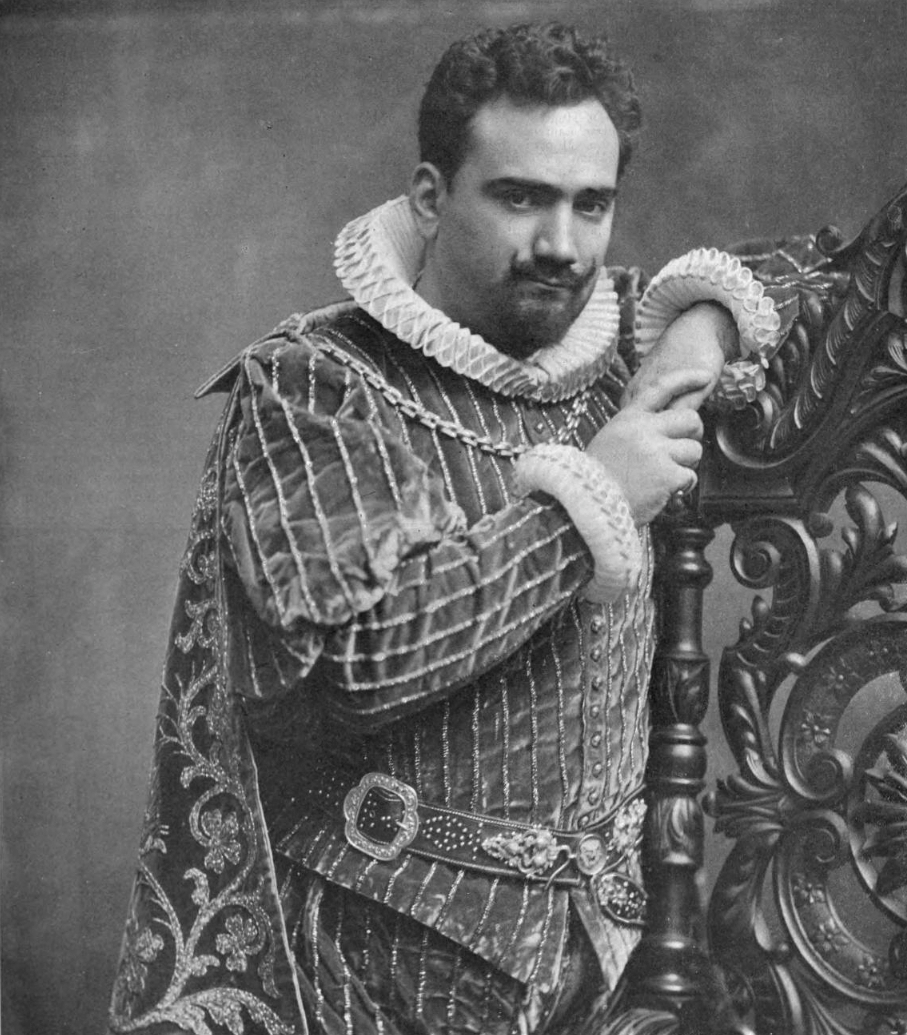
Enrico Caruso as the Duke in Rigoletto, 1904

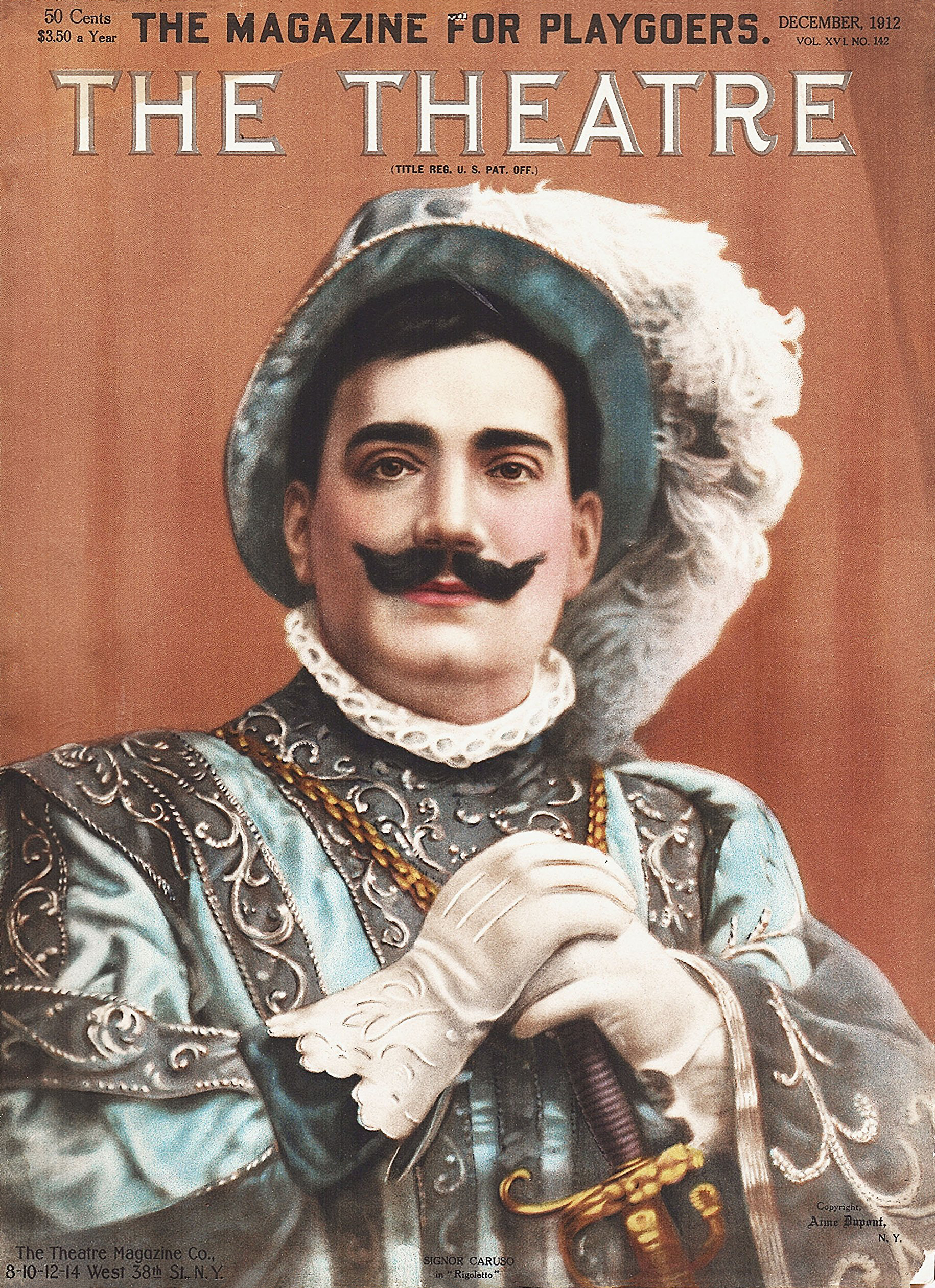
Caruso as Duke in The Theatre, 1912

In February 1901, Caruso participated in a grand concert at La Scala organized by Toscanini to mark the recent death of Giuseppe Verdi. Among those who appeared with him at the concert were two other leading Italian tenors of the day, Francesco Tamagno (the creator of the protagonist's role in Verdi's Otello) and Giuseppe Borgatti (the creator of the protagonist's role in Giordano's Andrea Chénier). In December 1901, Caruso made his debut at the San Carlo Opera House in Naples in L'Elisir d'Amore to a lukewarm reception; two weeks later, he appeared as Des Grieux in Massenet's Manon which was even more coolly received. The indifference of the audiences and harsh critical reviews in Caruso's native city hurt him deeply, and he vowed never again to sing there. He later said: "I will never again come to Naples to sing; it will only be to eat a plate of spaghetti". In March 1902, Caruso embarked on his last series of performances at La Scala. On 11 March, he sang under Toscanini in the world premiere of Germania by Alberto Franchetti, creating the principal tenor role of Frederico Loewe.

A month later, on 11 April, Caruso was engaged by the British Gramophone Company to make his first series of recordings in Milan, for a fee of 100 pounds sterling. These ten records swiftly became best-sellers. Among other things, they helped spread 29-year-old Caruso's fame throughout the English-speaking world. The management of London's Royal Opera House, Covent Garden, engaged him for a season of appearances in eight different operas ranging from Verdi's Aida to Mozart's Don Giovanni. On 14 May 1902, Caruso made his successful debut at Covent Garden as the Duke of Mantua in Verdi's Rigoletto. Covent Garden's highest-paid diva, the Australian soprano Nellie Melba, sang opposite him as Gilda in their first of several appearances together during the early 1900s. In her memoirs, Melba praised Caruso's voice but considered him to be a less sophisticated musician and interpretive artist than Jean de Reszke, the Met's star tenor before Caruso.

=== Metropolitan Opera ===
On 23 November 1903, Caruso made his debut with the Metropolitan Opera in New York City. The gap between his London and New York engagements had been filled by a series of performances in Italy, Portugal and South America. Caruso's contract had been negotiated by his agent, the banker and impresario Pasquale Simonelli. Caruso's Met debut was in a new production of Rigoletto with Marcella Sembrich singing opposite him as Gilda. A few months later, Caruso began his lifelong association with the Victor Talking Machine Company. He made his first recordings in America on 1 February 1904 in Carnegie Hall, having signed a lucrative financial deal with Victor. Thereafter, Caruso's recording career ran in concert with his Met appearances, each bolstering the other, until his death in 1921.

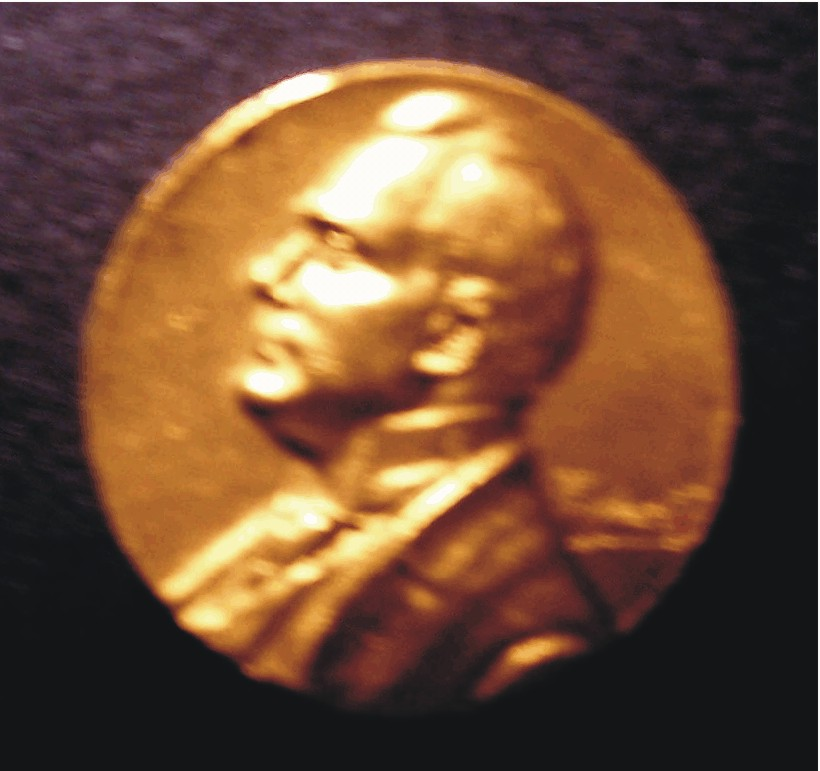
The medal that Caruso gave to Pasquale Simonelli, his New York City impresario

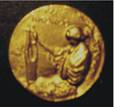
Reverse: Euterpe, muse of music, with lyre

In 1904, Caruso purchased the Villa Bellosguardo, a palatial estate near Florence. The villa became his retreat from the pressures of the operatic stage and the grind of travel. Caruso's preferred address in New York City was a suite at Manhattan's Knickerbocker Hotel. Caruso commissioned the New York jewellers Tiffany & Co. to strike a 24-carat gold medal adorned with the tenor's profile. He presented the medal in gratitude to Simonelli as a souvenir of his many well-remunerated performances at the Met.

In addition to his regular New York engagements, Caruso appeared in opera and gave occasional recitals in a large number of cities across the United States and Canada. He also continued to sing widely in South America and Europe, again appearing at Covent Garden in 1904–07 and 1913–14, and undertaking a tour of the UK, including Scotland, in 1909. Prior to the outbreak of the First World War, Caruso sang regularly in Germany, Austria, Hungary, France, Belgium and Monaco. In 1909, Melba asked him to participate in her forthcoming tour of Australia, but he declined because of the distance and significant amount of travel time that such a trip would entail.

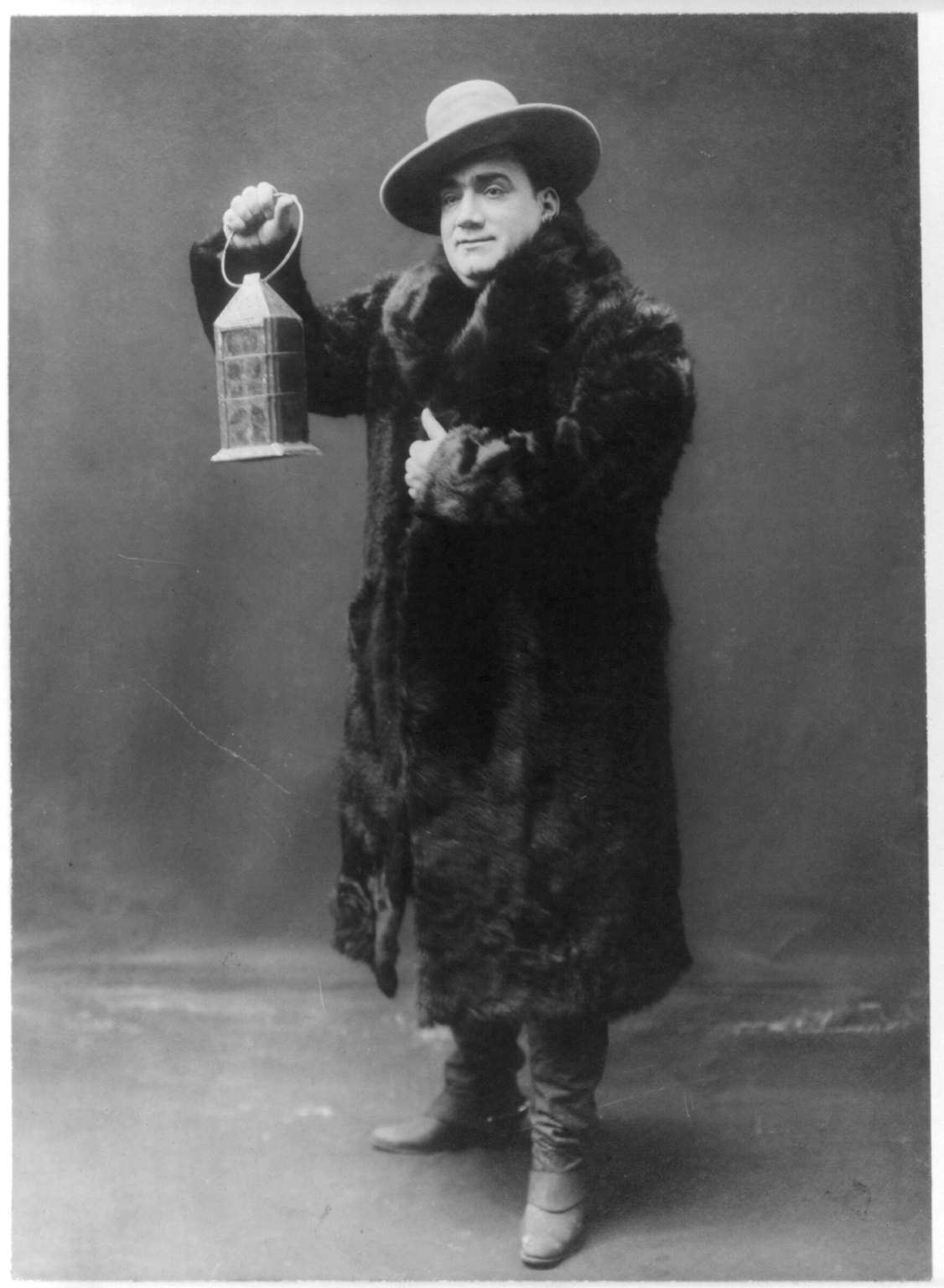
Caruso in the role of Dick Johnson, 1910/1911

Caruso and other members of the Metropolitan Opera visited San Francisco on tour in April 1906. The morning after an appearance as Don José in Carmen at the city's Grand Opera House, a strong jolt awakened Caruso at 5:13 AM on April 18 in his suite at the Palace Hotel. He found himself in the middle of the San Francisco earthquake, which led to a series of fires that destroyed most of the city. The Met lost all of the sets, costumes and musical instruments that had been brought on tour, but none of the company members were harmed. There are innumerable stories about Caruso's experience in the earthquake, many of them contradictory, some of them implausible, and it has become difficult to separate fact from fiction. Caruso grabbed his autographed photo of President Theodore Roosevelt and ran from the hotel into the street. Supposedly, he composed himself enough to walk to the St. Francis Hotel, where he ordered breakfast. Charlie Olson, the broiler cook, served the tenor bacon and eggs. The disaster apparently did not adversely effect Caruso's appetite, as he cleaned his plate and tipped Olson $2.50. Eventually, Caruso was successful in fleeing the burning city, first by boat and then by train, using his autographed photo of the President as a form of identification. "Give me Vesuvius" he said, when asked later about the experience. Caruso vowed never to return to San Francisco and he kept his word.

In November 1906, Caruso was arrested and charged with allegedly pinching the buttocks of a woman in the monkey house of New York's Central Park Zoo. Caruso claimed a monkey did the bottom-pinching and evidence was soon uncovered which proved the tenor had almost certainly been framed (the victim gave a false address, never appeared in court and knew the arresting officer who previously made similar charges against men in the monkey house). Nevertheless, Caruso was found guilty and fined ten dollars. The incident received extensive newspaper coverage and some members of New York's opera-going high society were initially outraged. However, the affair was soon forgotten and Caruso's popularity was unaffected. Caruso's fan base at the Met was not restricted, however, to the wealthy; he enjoyed an immense following among New York's half million Italian immigrants and middle classes, who eagerly paid to hear him sing and purchased his records.

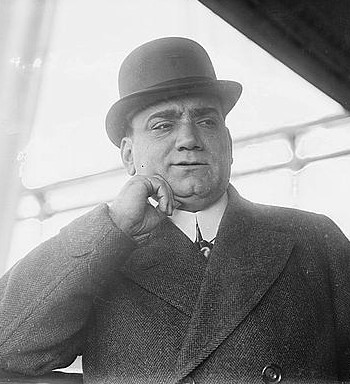
Caruso in 1911

On 10 December 1910, Caruso created the role of Dick Johnson in the world premiere of Puccini's La fanciulla del West. The composer wrote the music for Johnson with Caruso's voice specifically in mind. Appearing with Caruso were two more of the Met's star singers, the Czech soprano Emmy Destinn and baritone Pasquale Amato. Arturo Toscanini, then the Met's principal conductor, presided in the orchestra pit. David Belasco, author of the original play and Puccini himself were both on hand to personally supervise the production.

=== Extortion by Black Hand ===
Caruso's immense popularity drew the attention of New York's Black Hand extortionists. They threatened to harm him and his family, or injure his throat with lye if he did not pay them $2000 (US $65,000 in 2025). The tenor promptly paid their extortion fee and expected the matter to be closed, but his willingness to pay made them regard him as an easy mark. They subsequently demanded an even larger sum of $15,000 (US $489,000 in 2025) Caruso had no intention of paying a second time and he contacted the police. He was aided by New York City police detective Joseph Petrosino who, impersonating Caruso, captured the extortionists. Two Italian men, Antonio Misiano and Antonio Cincotto, were charged for the crime.

=== Later career and personal life ===
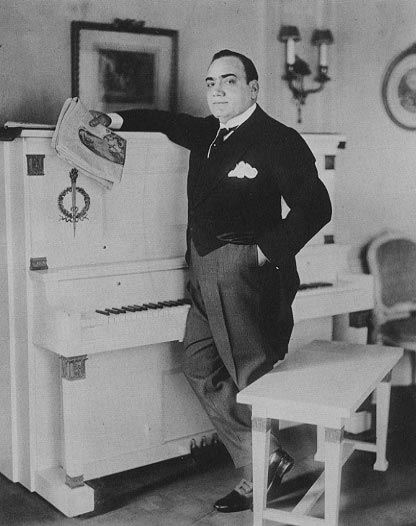
Caruso in front of his white Empire-style upright piano, in his apartment in New York City

As he aged, the timbre of Caruso's voice gradually darkened and by 1916, he began adding dramatic tenor parts such as Samson, John of Leyden, and Eléazar to his repertoire, while still singing lyric tenor roles such as Nemorino and Lionello. During 1915 and again in 1917, Caruso toured South America, with performances in Argentina, Uruguay, and Brazil. He performed in Mexico City in 1919, where he sang operatic performances in a bullring. In the spring of 1920, Caruso travelled to Havana, Cuba where he was paid the enormous sum of US $10,000 a night (US$161,000 in 2025).

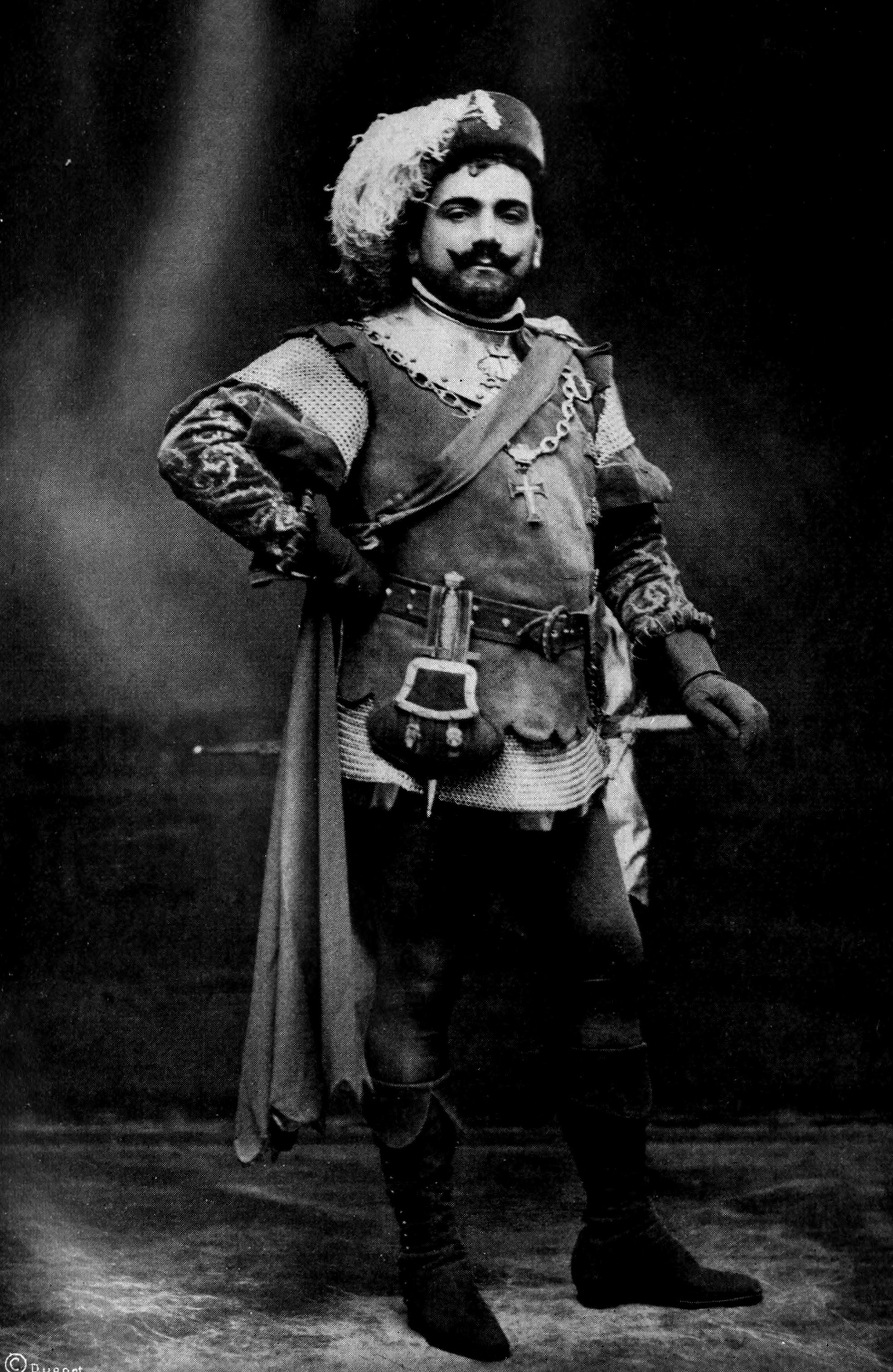
Caruso as Vasco da Gama in L'Africaine, 1907

In 1917, the United States entered the First World War. Caruso did extensive patriotic charity work during the conflict, raising money for many war-related causes by giving concerts and participating enthusiastically in Liberty Bond drives. Caruso had shown himself to be a shrewd businessman since arriving in America. He put a sizeable proportion of his earnings from record royalties and singing fees into a range of investments. Biographer Michael Scott writes that by the end of the war in 1918, Caruso's annual income tax bill amounted to $154,000 (US$3.3 million in 2025).

From 1897 to 1908, Caruso had been romantically linked to an Italian soprano, Ada Giachetti. Although she was already married (Divorce did not exist in Italy until 1970), Giachetti bore Caruso two sons during their liaison: Rodolfo Caruso (1898–1951) and singer/actor Enrico Caruso Jr. (1904–1987). Giachetti had left her husband, manufacturer Gino Botti, and an existing son to cohabit with the tenor. Information provided in Scott's biography of Caruso suggests that she was Caruso's vocal coach as well as his lover. Statements by Enrico Caruso Jr. in his book tend to substantiate this. Caruso and Giachetti separated in 1908, after she began a love affair with Cesare Romati, the tenor's chauffeur. Giachetti's subsequent attempts to sue Caruso for damages were dismissed by the courts. Caruso was also engaged in a lengthy, sporadic romance with Rina Giachetti, Ada's sister.

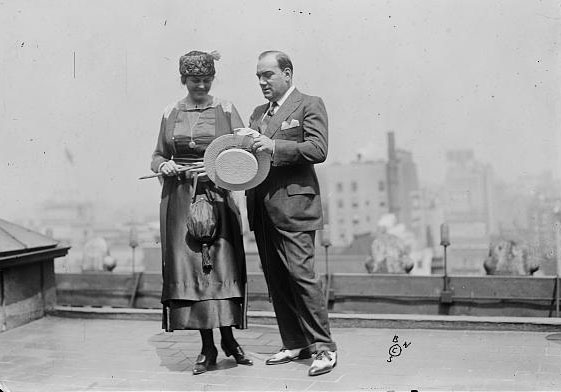
Caruso and his wife on their wedding day, August, 1918

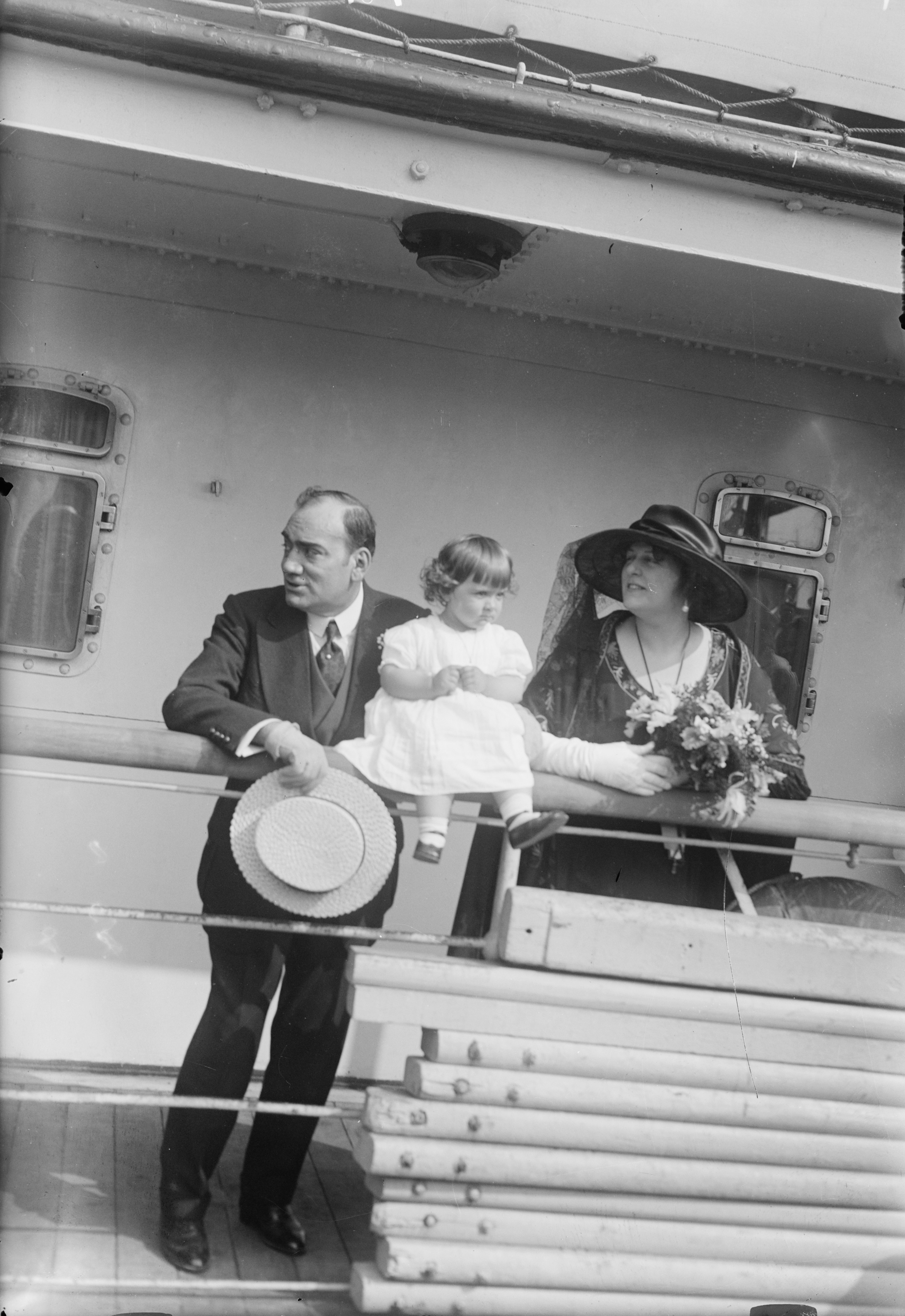
Caruso with his wife and daughter sailing for Italy, May, 1921

In 1917, Caruso met and courted a 25-year-old socialite, Dorothy Park Benjamin (1893–1955). She was the daughter of Park Benjamin, a wealthy New York patent lawyer and author. In spite of the disapproval of Dorothy's father, the couple wed on 20 August 1918. They had a daughter, Gloria Caruso (1919–1999). Dorothy wrote two biographies of Caruso, Wings of Song: the Story of Caruso, published in 1928 and Enrico Caruso: His Life and Death, in 1945; the latter book, which includes many of Caruso's letters to his wife, was a best-seller and served as the basis for the screenplay of the biographical motion picture The Great Caruso (1951), starring tenor Mario Lanza as Caruso.

A fastidious dresser, Caruso took at least two baths a day and enjoyed good food and convivial company. He forged a particularly close bond with his Met and Covent Garden colleague Antonio Scotti – an amiable and stylish baritone from Naples. Caruso was very superstitious and habitually carried several good-luck charms with him when he sang. He often played cards for relaxation, especially the games, Scopa and Bazzica. An expert caricaturist, he made countless sketches of himself, friends, singers, musicians and even strangers. His wife, Dorothy, said that by the time she knew him, her husband's favourite hobby was compiling scrapbooks of his caricatures and reviews of his singing. He also amassed valuable collections of rare coins, postage stamps, watches and antique snuffboxes. Caruso was a heavy smoker of strong Egyptian cigarettes. This deleterious habit, combined with a lack of exercise and the punishing schedule of performances that Caruso willingly undertook each season at the Metropolitan Opera (Incredibly, in his early Met seasons he sang as often as seven times a week) may have contributed to the persistent ill-health which plagued him the during the last year of his life.

=== Illness and death ===
Caruso as Éléazar in La Juive, 1920

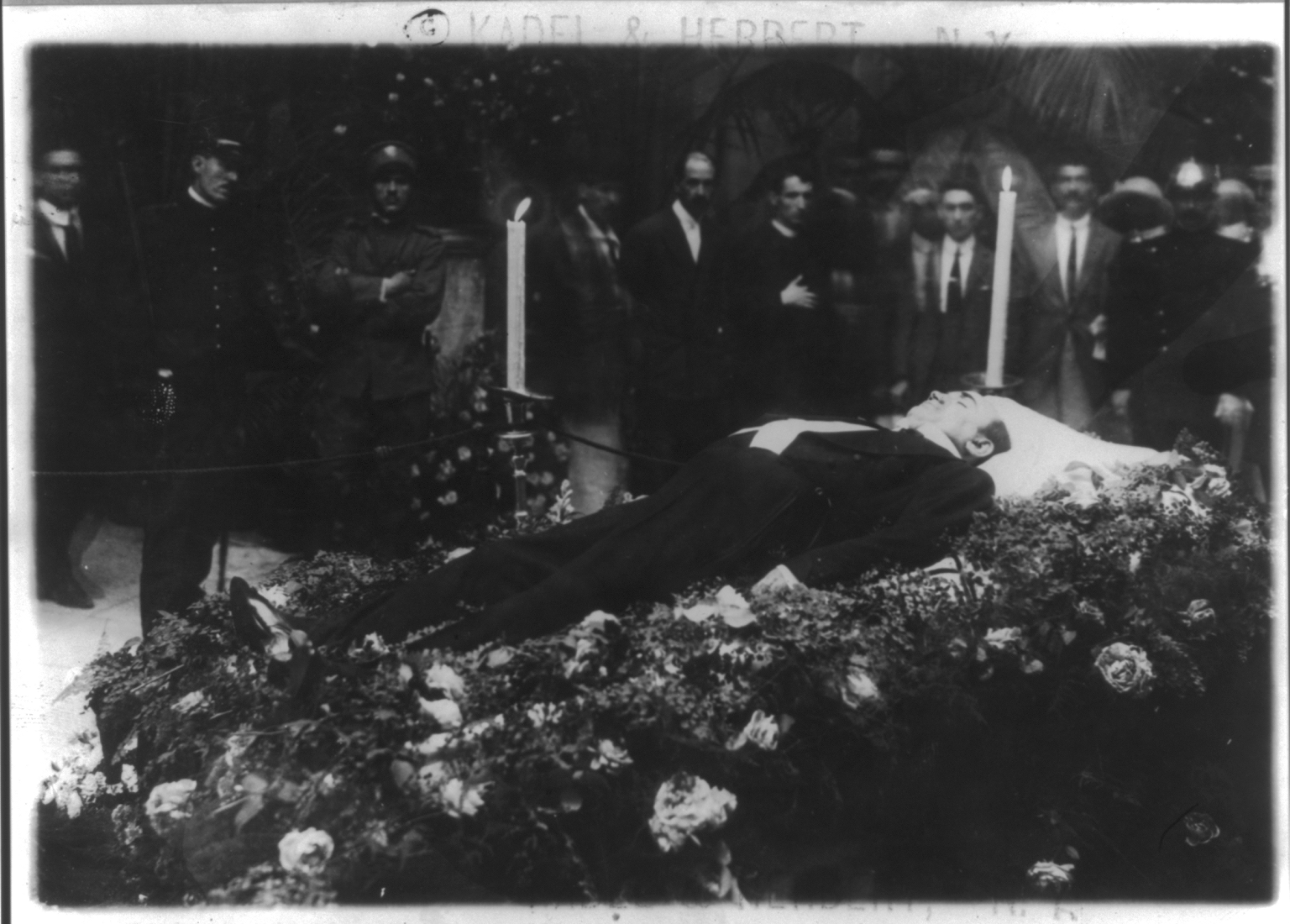
Caruso's body lying in state in the Vesuvio Hotel in Naples, 3 August 1921

On 16 September 1920, Caruso concluded three days of recording sessions at the Trinity Church studio of the Victor Talking Machine Company in Camden, New Jersey. The sessions produced nine discs, including the Domine Deus and Crucifixus from the Petite messe solennelle by Rossini. These were the final recordings he made.

Dorothy Caruso noted that her husband's health began to decline during the late summer and autumn of 1920, just before he undertook an extensive North American concert tour. In his Father's biography, Enrico Caruso Jr. points to an on-stage injury suffered by Caruso as the possible trigger of his fatal illness. A scenery malfunction during a performance of Saint-Saëns' Samson and Delilah at the Met on 3 December caused a decorative pillar to fall and hit Caruso on the back, over the left kidney (and not on the chest as often reported). The following day, Caruso suffered a chill and developed a cough and a "dull pain in his side" near the area he had been struck by the pillar. It was initially believed to be a severe episode of bronchitis. Caruso's controversial physician, Dr. Philip Horowitz, who gave the tenor questionable treatments for migraine headaches and other ailments, diagnosed "intercostal neuralgia" and pronounced Caruso fit to appear on stage, although the pain steadily worsened and began to hinder his movements and voice production. Dr. Horowitz was later discharged by Dorothy.

On 11 December 1920, during a performance of L'elisir d'amore at the Brooklyn Academy of Music, Caruso began spitting blood as a result of a mouth or throat haemorrhage and the performance was cancelled after the first act. Following this incident, an ailing Caruso sang two more performances (in La Forza del Destino and Samson and Dalilah) and cancelled another (L'elisir d'amore) at the Met before his appearance on Christmas Eve. On 24 December 1920, Caruso sang the final performance of his career in Halévy's La Juive while suffering acute pain. Toscanini, in the United States on tour with the La Scala Orchestra, attended the performance and afterward remarked to Met General Manager Giulio Gatti-Casazza: "What is wrong with Caruso? The man must be sick. He looks very bad, I am anxious about him." Upon returning home after the performance, Dorothy was horrified by the colour of his complexion which she described as "a curious greyish-green". On Christmas Day, as Caruso was dressing to leave for the Met to deliver Christmas gifts for the employees, the pain in his side had become so excruciating that he began screaming. Dorothy summoned the Vanderbilt Hotel physician, who gave Caruso some morphine and codeine and called in another doctor, Evan M. Evans. Evans brought in three other doctors, and Caruso finally received a correct diagnosis: pleurisy and pneumonia.

Caruso lingered between life and death during the early weeks of 1921. He lapsed into a coma and at one point, nearly succumbed to heart failure. He continued to experience episodes of severe pain due to the infection and underwent a total of seven surgical procedures to drain fluid and pus from his chest cavity. The most serious of these operations occurred on 12 February, which required the removal of part of a rib. (Note: Caruso described his illness and surgical procedures in a lengthy letter to his brother Giovanni, reprinted in Robinson 1957, p. 137.) After a blood transfusion and two final surgeries in March, Caruso's condition slowly began to improve, and by late May he had recovered sufficiently to sail to Italy to further recuperate. According to Dorothy, while in Naples and Sorrento, he appeared to be proceeding with his convalescence and had regained about 25 pounds. However in July, a group of Caruso's Italian friends encouraged him to undertake several long and tiring excursions to Capri and Pompeii in extremely hot weather, attend dinner parties and otherwise overexert himself. The tenor's fever returned and his condition began to deteriorate dramatically after that (it is believed that an unhygienic elderly doctor examined Caruso using an unsterilized instrument which may have caused the final infection). The Bastianelli brothers, eminent Italian medical practitioners, examined Caruso and recommended that his left kidney be removed. On 31 July, Caruso and his entourage left Sorrento for the Bastianelli's clinic in Rome, but by the time they reached Naples, Caruso was running a high fever and was gravely ill. The party checked into the Hotel Vesuvio, where Caruso was immediately put to bed and went to sleep that evening with a temperature of 104°F (40°C). The next day, he began screaming in pain. Dorothy began a frantic search for a doctor, but most had left the city for the summer. After four hours, a doctor was finally located; he injected Caruso with morphine to help him sleep.

Caruso died the following morning at the Hotel Vesuvio shortly after 9:00 a.m. local time, on 2 August 1921. He was 48 years old. Although no post-mortem examination was performed, the Bastianellis attributed the cause of Caruso's death to peritonitis, arising from a burst subphrenic abscess. The King of Italy, Victor Emmanuel III, opened the Royal Basilica of the Church of San Francesco di Paola for Caruso's funeral, which was attended by thousands of people. Caruso was entombed at the Del Pianto cemetery in Naples; for several years, the singer's embalmed body was displayed in an open sarcophagus, covered by a sheet of glass, for visitors to view. Dorothy Caruso had never approved of this Italian custom but his family had insisted on it. In 1929, after appealing directly to the Italian government, she was finally successful in having the sarcophagus covered and the doors to the tomb locked.

== Voice and technique ==
Caruso possessed a unique tenor voice of baritonal weight and colouring, described as "a torrential outpouring of mellow tone, the like of which had never been heard before and has not been heard since." His voice and vocal technique are described in depth by his personal physician and voice specialist, Mario Marafioti in his book, Caruso's Method of Voice Production published in 1922, a year following the singer's death.

In the book, Marafioti argues that there is a correct singing method grounded in science. While Marafioti calls Caruso's singing method "natural", he believes that the method is teachable. Marafioti characterizes singing as basically "speaking in musical rhythm" and suggests that singers focus on developing their speaking voice, clear enunciation, and strong resonance.

== Historical and musical significance ==
Caruso's career, which lasted from 1895 to 1920, included 863 appearances with the New York Metropolitan Opera (both at the Met and on tour) before his death in 1921 at the age of 48. Thanks largely to his popular phonograph records, Caruso was one of the most famous entertainment personalities of his day, and his fame has continued to endure to the present. He was one of the first examples of a global media celebrity. Beyond records, Caruso's name became familiar to millions throughout the world via newspapers, books, magazines, and the new media technology of the 20th century: cinema, the telephone, and telegraph.

Caruso toured frequently with the Metropolitan Opera company and occasionally as a recitalist. He also appeared in opera performances throughout Europe and North and South America. He was a client of the noted promoter Edward Bernays during the latter's tenure as a press agent in the United States. Beverly Sills noted in an interview: "I was able to do it with television and radio and media and all kinds of assists. The popularity that Caruso enjoyed without any of this technological assistance is astonishing."

Caruso biographers, including Pierre Key, Bruno Zirato and Stanley Jackson attribute Caruso's fame not only to his voice and musicianship but also to a keen business sense and an enthusiastic reception of commercial sound recording, then in its infancy. Many opera singers of Caruso's time rejected the phonograph (or gramophone), regarding it as a toy or novelty. Others, including Adelina Patti, Francesco Tamagno and Nellie Melba, embraced the new technology once they became aware of the lucrative financial returns that Caruso was reaping from his initial recording sessions.

From 1904 to 1920, Caruso made more than 260 extant recordings for the Victor Talking Machine Company (later RCA Victor). Caruso and his heirs earned millions of dollars in royalty payments from the retail sales of these records. He was also heard live from the stage of the Metropolitan Opera House in 1910 when he participated in the first public radio broadcast to be transmitted in the United States.

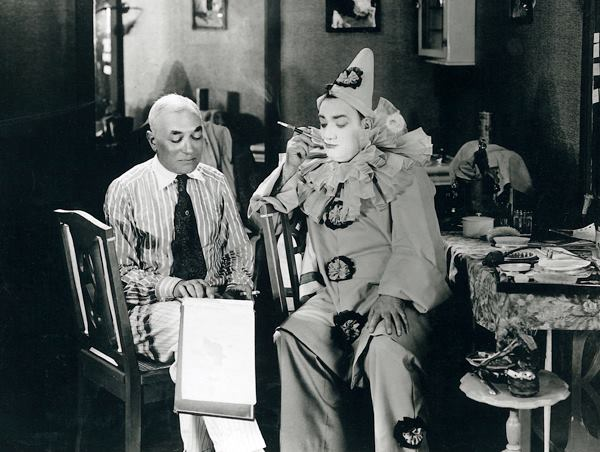
Edward José (left), the director of the film My Cousin, with Caruso during a break in filming

Caruso also appeared in two motion pictures. In 1918, he played a dual role in the American silent film My Cousin (entirely restored in July 2021) for Paramount Pictures. This film included a sequence depicting him on stage performing the aria Vesti la giubba from Leoncavallo's opera Pagliacci. The following year, Caruso played a character called Cosimo in another film, The Splendid Romance. Producer Jesse Lasky paid Caruso $100,000 (US$2.14 million in 2025) each to appear in these two efforts but My Cousin flopped at the box office, and The Splendid Romance was apparently never released in the United States. Brief candid glimpses of Caruso offstage have been preserved in contemporary newsreel footage.

While Caruso sang at such venues as La Scala in Milan, the Royal Opera House, in London, the Mariinsky Theatre in Saint Petersburg, and the Teatro Colón in Buenos Aires, he appeared most often at the Metropolitan Opera in New York City, where he was the leading tenor for 18 consecutive seasons. It was at the Met, in 1910, that he created the role of Dick Johnson in Giacomo Puccini's La fanciulla del West.

Caruso's voice extended up to high D-flat in its prime and grew in power and weight as he grew older. At times, his voice took on a dark, almost baritonal colouration. He sang a broad spectrum of roles, ranging from lyric, to spinto, to dramatic parts, in the Italian and French repertoires. In the German repertoire, Caruso sang only two roles, Assad in Karl Goldmark's The Queen of Sheba and Richard Wagner's Lohengrin, both of which he performed in Italian in Buenos Aires in 1899 and 1901, respectively.

== Honors and recognitions ==
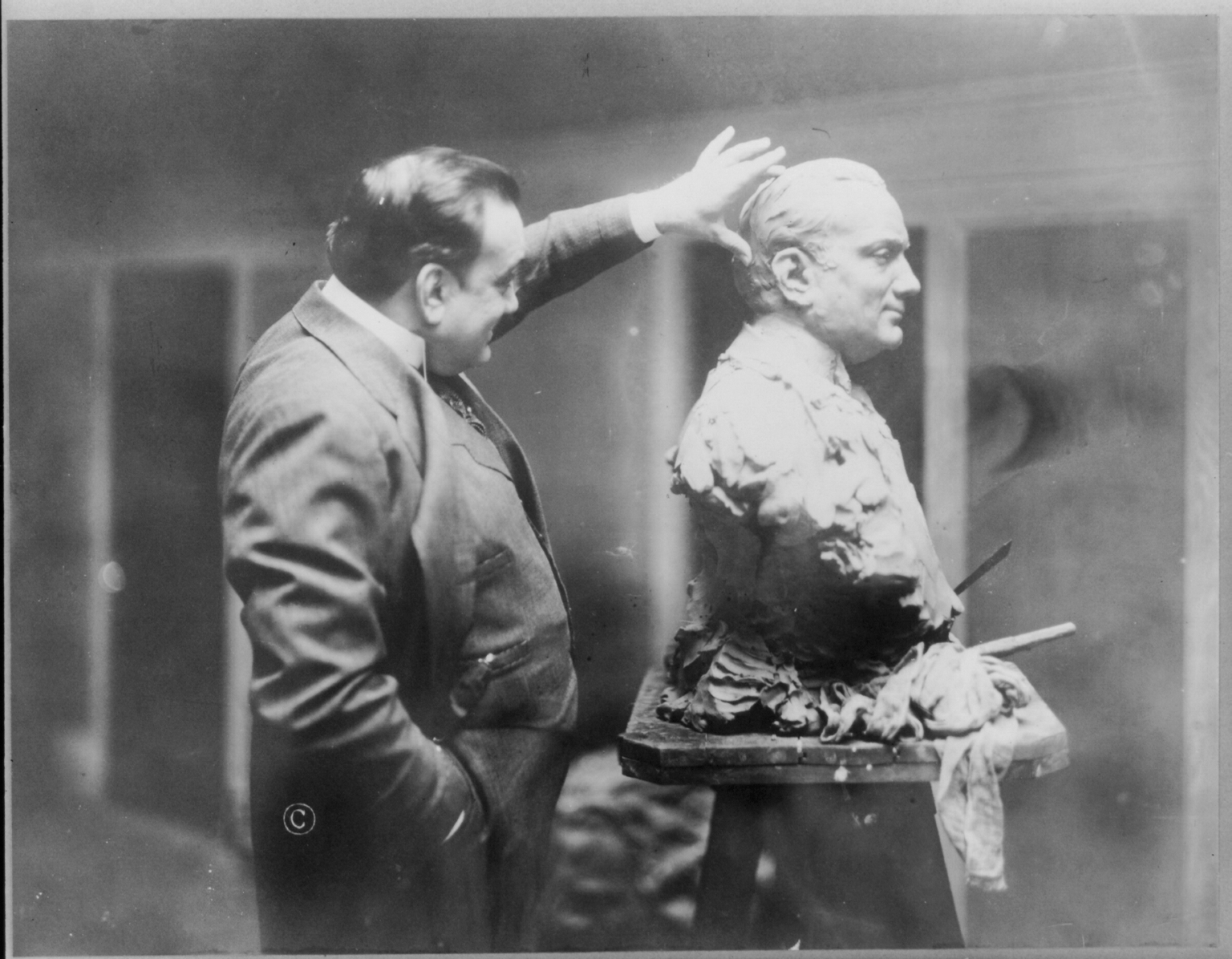
Caruso, examining a bust sculpture of himself, 1914

During his lifetime, Caruso was the recipient of numerous orders, decorations, testimonials and other kinds of honours from monarchs, governments and miscellaneous cultural bodies of the various nations and cities in which he sang. He was also the recipient of Italian knighthoods. In July 1907, Edward VII, the British sovereign, appointed him an honorary Member Fourth Class of the Royal Victorian Order (MVO). In 1917, he was elected an honorary member of the Phi Mu Alpha Sinfonia, the national fraternity for men involved in music, by the fraternity's Alpha chapter of the New England Conservatory of Music in Boston. According to Dorothy Caruso, an unusual award bestowed on him in 1918 of "Honorary Captain of the New York Police Force", pleased him more than any of the other decorations he received.

In 1960, for his contribution to the recording industry, Caruso received a star located at 6625 Hollywood Boulevard on the Hollywood Walk of Fame. In 1987, Caruso was posthumously awarded a Grammy Lifetime Achievement Award. On 27 February of that same year, the United States Postal Service issued a 22-cent postage stamp with his likeness in his honour. He was voted into Gramophone's Hall of Fame in 2012.

== Repertoire ==
Caruso's repertoire consisted primarily of Italian opera, along with a handful of roles in French. He also performed two German operas, Wagner's Lohengrin and Goldmark's Die Königin von Saba, singing in Italian, early in his career. Below are the first performances by Caruso, in chronological order, of each of the operas that he undertook on the stage. World premieres are indicated with **.

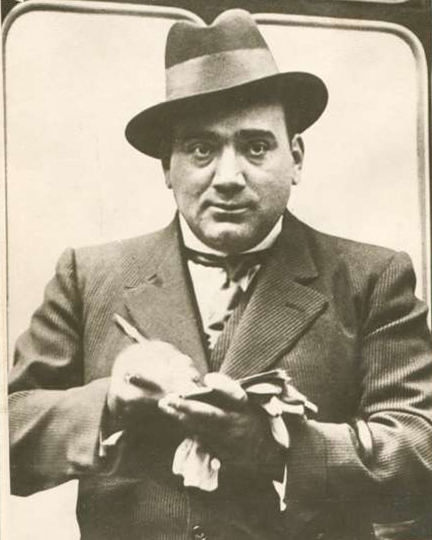
Caruso signing his autograph

- L'amico Francesco (Morelli) – Teatro Nuovo, Napoli, 15 March 1895 (debut)**
- Faust – Caserta, 28 March 1895
- Cavalleria rusticana – Caserta, April 1895
- Camoens (Musoni) – Caserta, May 1895
- Rigoletto – Napoli, 21 July 1895
- La traviata – Napoli, 25 August 1895
- Lucia di Lammermoor – Cairo, 30 October 1895
- La Gioconda – Cairo, 9 November 1895
- Manon Lescaut – Cairo, 15 November 1895
- I Capuleti e i Montecchi – Napoli, 7 December 1895
- Malia (Francesco Paolo Frontini) – Trapani, 21 March 1896
- La sonnambula – Trapani, 25 March 1896
- Mariedda (Gianni Bucceri) – Napoli, 23 June 1896
- I puritani – Salerno, 10 September 1896
- La Favorita – Salerno, 22 November 1896
- A San Francisco (Sebastiani) – Salerno, 23 November 1896
- Carmen – Salerno, 6 December 1896

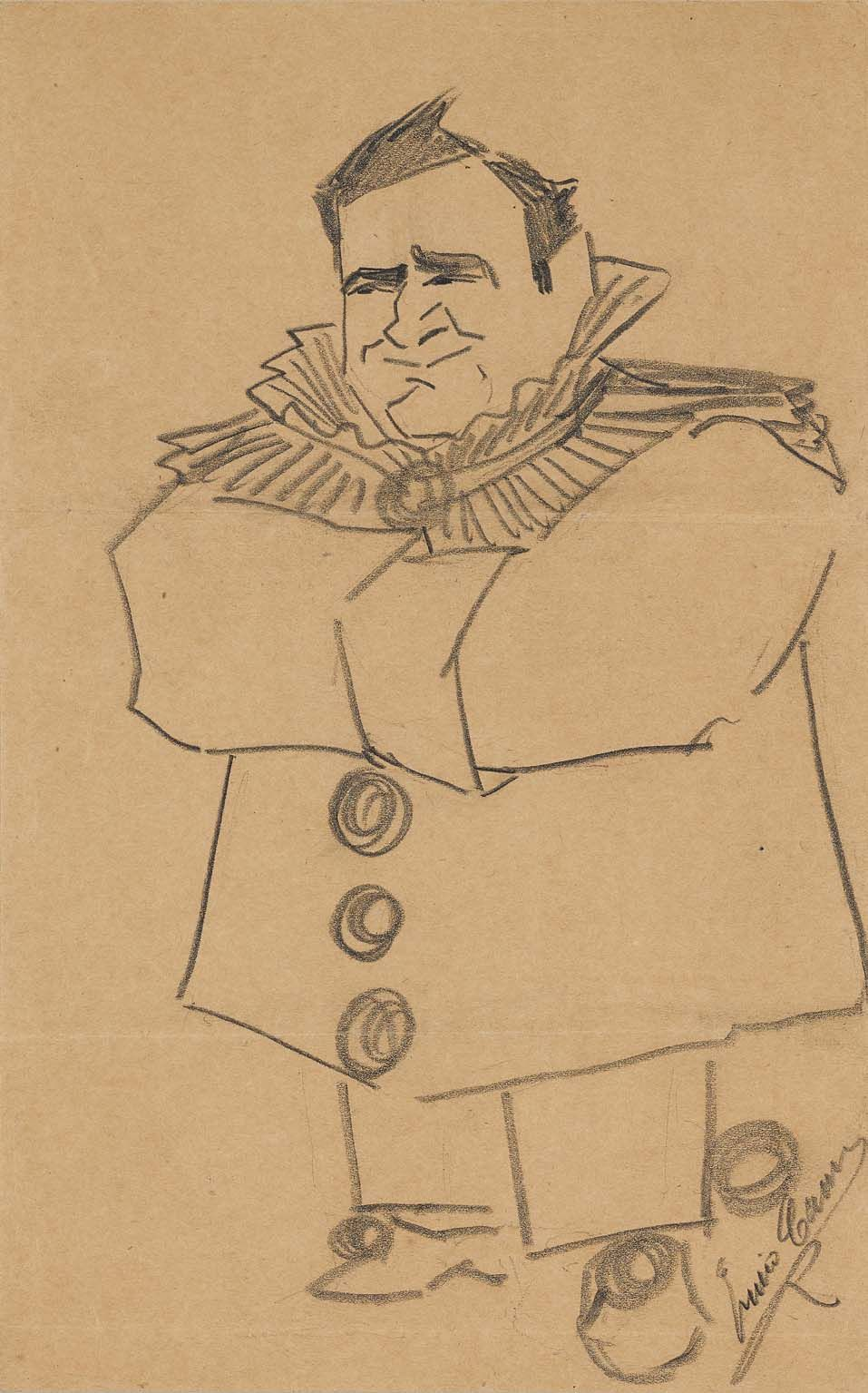
Caruso's sketch of himself as Canio in Pagliacci, c. 1900

- Un Dramma in vendemmia (Fornari) – Napoli, 1 February 1897
- Celeste (Marengo) – Napoli, 6 March 1897**
- Il Profeta Velato (Napolitano) – Salerno, 8 April 1897
- La bohème – Livorno, 14 August 1897
- La Navarrese – Milano, 3 November 1897
- Il Voto (Giordano) – Milano, 10 November 1897**
- L'arlesiana – Milano, 27 November 1897**
- Pagliacci – Milano, 31 December 1897
- La bohème (Leoncavallo) – Genova, 20 January 1898
- The Pearl Fishers – Genova, 3 February 1898
- Hedda (Leborne) – Milano, 2 April 1898**
- Mefistofele – Fiume, 4 March 1898
- Sapho (Massenet) – Trento, 3 June (?) 1898
- Fedora – Milano, 17 November 1898**
- Iris – Buenos Aires, 22 June 1899
- La regina di Saba (Goldmark) – Buenos Aires, 4 July 1899
- Yupanki (Berutti)– Buenos Aires, 25 July 1899**
- Aida – St. Petersburg, 3 January 1900
- Un ballo in maschera – St. Petersburg, 11 January 1900
- Maria di Rohan – St. Petersburg, 2 March 1900

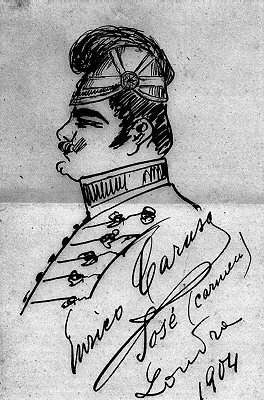
Caruso's sketch of himself as Don José in Carmen, 1904

- Manon – Buenos Aires, 28 July 1900
- Tosca – Treviso, 23 October 1900
- Le maschere (Mascagni) – Milano, 17 January 1901**
- L'elisir d'amore – Milano, 17 February 1901
- Lohengrin – Buenos Aires, 7 July 1901
- Germania – Milano, 11 March 1902**
- Don Giovanni – London, 19 July 1902
- Adriana Lecouvreur – Milano, 6 November 1902**
- Lucrezia Borgia – Lisbon, 10 March 1903
- Les Huguenots – New York, 3 February 1905
- Martha – New York, 9 February 1906
- Madama Butterfly – London, 26 May 1906
- L'Africana – New York, 11 January 1907
- Andrea Chénier – London, 20 July 1907
- Il trovatore – New York, 26 February 1908
- Armide – New York, 14 November 1910
- La fanciulla del West – New York, 10 December 1910**
- Julien – New York, 26 December 1914
- Samson et Dalila – New York, 24 November 1916
- Lodoletta – Buenos Aires, 29 July 1917
- Le prophète – New York, 7 February 1918
- L'amore dei tre re – New York, 14 March 1918
- La forza del destino – New York, 15 November 1918
- La Juive – New York, 22 November 1919

Caruso also had a repertoire of more than 500 songs. They ranged from classical compositions to traditional Italian melodies and popular tunes of the day, including a few English-language titles such as George M. Cohan's "Over There", Henry Geehl's "For You Alone" and Arthur Sullivan's "The Lost Chord".

== Recorded legacy ==
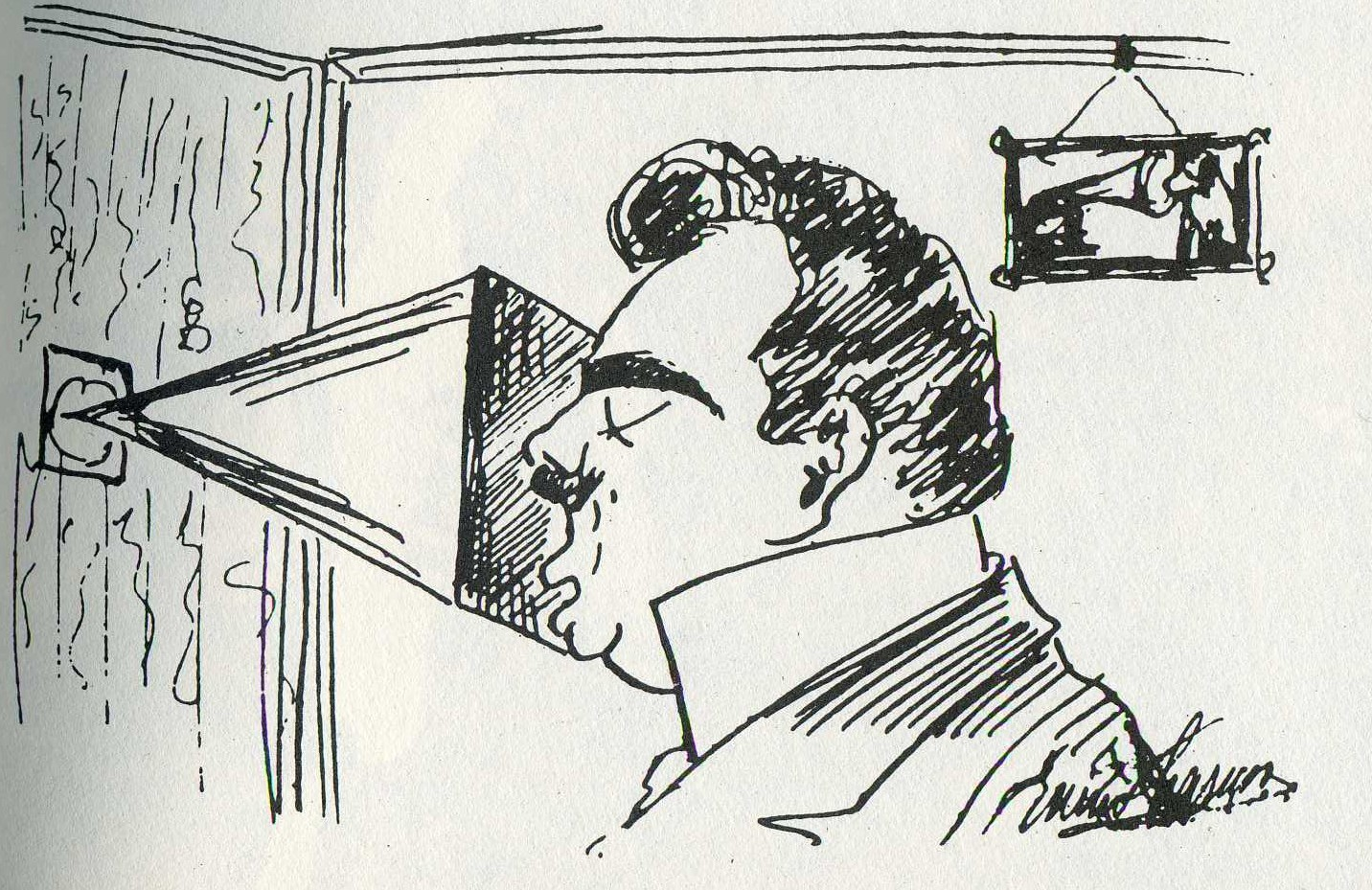
Self-caricature of Caruso making a record (note "His Master's Voice" trademark on wall)

Enrico Caruso died in 1921, before the advent of electrical recording technology in 1925. His entire recorded output was made using the acoustic process, which required the performer to sing into a metal horn or funnel; the sound was relayed directly onto a wax master disc, using a stylus. This antiquated process captured a limited range of the overtones and nuances present in a singing voice. Caruso's 12-inch disc records were limited to a maximum playing time of approximately four and one-half minutes; consequently, most of the operatic selections that he recorded were limited to that duration or those which could be edited to fit this time constraint. Occasionally, longer excerpts were issued on two or more record sides.

Caruso is generally acknowledged as the record industry's first major recording star. He possessed a phonogenic voice which was "manly and powerful, yet sweet and lyrical", to quote the singer/author John Potter (see bibliography below). Caruso and the disc phonograph (known in the United Kingdom as the gramophone) did much to promote each other during the first two decades of the 20th century. During his lifetime, Caruso earned more in royalties from the sales of his recordings than he did from his operatic appearances. From 1902 to 1921, Caruso's record royalties amounted to more than two million dollars (nearly $36 million in 2025). Many of Caruso's recordings have remained continuously available since their original release over a century ago. All of his surviving recordings (including several which were long unissued) have been remastered and reissued several times over the years. Although some recordings of complete operas had been undertaken during the early 1900s, Caruso never participated in a complete opera recording. He did, however, take part in a series of recordings for Victor of excerpts from Gounod's Faust with a unified cast featuring Geraldine Farrar, Marcel Journet, Antonio Scotti and Louise Homer.

Caruso's first recordings were arranged by recording pioneer Fred Gaisberg and cut on disc in three separate sessions in Milan during April, November and December 1902. They were made with piano accompaniments for the Gramophone & Typewriter Company Limited, forerunner of EMI Records. In April 1903, Caruso made seven further recordings, also in Milan, for the Anglo-Italian Commerce Company (AICC). These were originally released on discs bearing the Zonophone label. Three more Milan recordings for AICC followed in October 1903, released by Pathé Records on cylinders as well as on discs. On 1 February 1904, Caruso made his first recordings in the United States for the Victor Talking Machine Company. With the exception of one final recording for the Gramophone & Typewriter Company in April, 1904, Caruso thereafter recorded exclusively for Victor. The tenor's American recordings were all made in Victor's studios in New York and its headquarters in Camden, New Jersey. Some of Caruso's later recordings were made in Victor's Trinity Church studio in Camden, which Victor acquired in 1917 for its acoustical properties and could accommodate larger bands of musicians. Caruso's first Victor recordings in 1904 were made in Room 826, a small vocal studio located in Carnegie Hall in New York. "Questa o quella" and "La donna è mobile" from Verdi's Rigoletto were the first selections to be recorded. Caruso's final recording session took place on 16 September 1920 in Camden at Victor's Trinity Church studio, with the tenor singing the "Domine Deus" and "Crucifixus" from Rossini's Petite messe solennelle.

Caruso's earliest Victor records of operatic arias from 1904 and 1905, like their thirty or so Milan-made predecessors, were all piano-accompanied. Beginning on 11 February 1906, orchestral accompaniments became the norm, utilising an ensemble of between eleven and twenty musicians. The regular conductors of these recording sessions with the Victor Orchestra were Walter B. Rogers and, from 1916, Josef Pasternack. Beginning in 1932, RCA Victor in the USA and EMI (His Master's Voice) in the UK, reissued several of the Caruso discs with the original accompaniment over-dubbed by a larger electrically recorded orchestra. Earlier experiments using this re-dubbing technique by Victor in 1927 had been considered unsatisfactory. Although these overdubbed Caruso recordings were initially praised by some critics upon their original release in the 1930s, they are largely forgotten and vilified by collectors today. In 1947, RCA Victor began to reissue a number of the tenor's recordings on 78-rpm discs pressed on red vinylite instead of the usual shellac. In 1950, RCA Victor began issuing long-playing records (LPs) and many of Caruso's recordings were enhanced with the addition of electronic reverb, bass and treble to give them a "fuller" sound for release on the extended format. RCA Victor issued its first Caruso LP collections in 1951; most of these early LP compilations were simultaneously released on the new 45-rpm format, introduced by RCA Victor in 1949. In 1956, RCA Victor issued a limited edition 3 LP Caruso anthology in a deluxe album with an illustrated booklet. By 1959, RCA Victor had reissued more than half of their Caruso catalogue on LP records. Several more collections of Caruso recordings previously unavailable on LP were released by RCA Victor throughout the 1960s. In 1973, to mark the centennial year of Caruso's birth, the label issued a 4-record boxed set containing the tenor's remaining recordings not previously transferred to LP, including some unpublished items. In Italy that year, RCA Italiana released a comprehensive 12 LP boxed set containing the majority of Caruso's Victor recordings.

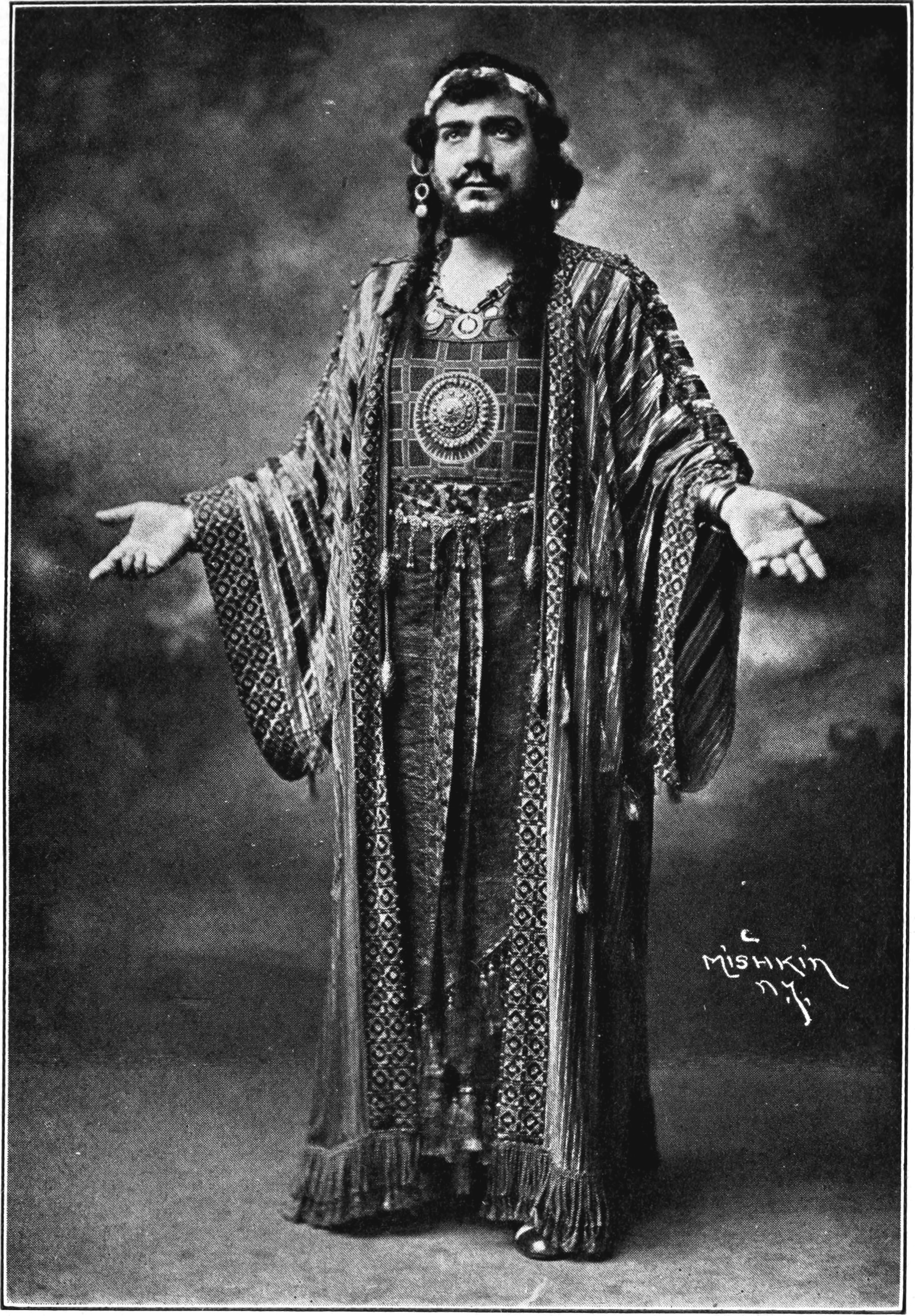
Caruso as Samson in Samson et Dalila, 1919

During the 1970s, Thomas G. Stockham of the University of Utah developed the "Soundstream" computer process to remaster Caruso's recordings for RCA. This early digital recording process claimed to remove or reduce some of the undesirable resonances, distortion and surface noise typical of the early acoustically recorded shellac discs (critics of Stockham's process later claimed that the only "reprocessing" the recordings received was merely "re-equalisation" by increasing bass and reducing treble). In 1976, RCA released an LP collection of sixteen of Caruso's most popular opera arias utilising the Soundstream computer process. From 1978 to 1985, RCA issued The Complete Caruso LP series, containing the Soundstream digitized recordings (after the introduction of the compact disc in the early 1980s, RCA never finished The Complete Caruso series on LP and the tenor's European and 1904-05 Victor recordings were never remastered using the Soundstream process). RCA released its first Caruso compact disc, a collection of 21 operatic arias, in 1987. Finally, in 1990, RCA Victor issued The Complete Caruso boxed set on 12 CDs (the recordings were repackaged and reissued by RCA again in 2004 and (minus the pre-Victor recordings) for a third time, in 2017). Other complete sets of Caruso's recordings in new remasterings were issued on CD on the Pearl label and in 2000–2004 by Naxos. The Pearl and Naxos sets were remastered by the noted American audio-restoration engineer Ward Marston. In 1993, Pearl also released a two-CD collection devoted to RCA and EMI's electrically overdubbed versions of some of Caruso's original acoustic discs, originally issued in the 1930s. Since 1999, RCA Victor has issued three CDs of Caruso recordings with digitally recorded overdubbed orchestral accompaniments. Since the expiration of their original copyrights, Caruso's records are now in the public domain in the United States and have been reissued by several different record labels with varying degrees of sound quality. They are also available over the internet as digital downloads. Caruso's best-selling downloads at iTunes have been the popular Italian folk songs "Santa Lucia" and "'O sole mio".

In addition to operatic arias, Caruso recorded many duets and ensembles with several noted opera stars of the period, including Bessie Abbot, Frances Alda, Mario Ancona, Pasquale Amato, Angelo Badà, Giuseppe De Luca, Maria Duchêne, Emmy Destinn, Geraldine Farrar, Johanna Gadski, Amelita Galli-Curci, Alma Gluck, Frieda Hempel, Louise Homer, Marcel Journet, Flora Perini, Léon Rothier, Titta Ruffo, Ernestine Schumann-Heink, Andrés de Segurola, Antonio Scotti, Marcella Sembrich and Luisa Tetrazzini.

== Media ==
- "O soave fanciulla" from Puccini's La bohème, with Nellie Melba (1907)
- "O Mimì, tu più non torni" with Antonio Scotti as Marcello from La bohème (1907)
- "Vesti la giubba" from Leoncavallo's Pagliacci (1907)
- "No! Pagliaccio non son!" from Pagliacci (1910)
- "Recondita armonia" from Puccini's Tosca (1908)
- "La donna è mobile", from Verdi's Rigoletto (1908)
- "O merveille! ... A moi les plaisirs" from Gounod's Faust, with Marcel Journet (1910)
- "Una furtiva lagrima" from Donizetti's L'elisir d'amore (1911)
- "Manon! avez-vous peur ... On l'appelle Manon" from Massenet's Manon (1912)
- "Ave Maria" (Percy Kahn) Mischa Elman on violin (1913)
- "Sì, pel ciel marmoreo giuro!" with Titta Ruffo, from Verdi's Otello (1914)
- "È scherzo od è follia", from Verdi's Un ballo in maschera, with Frieda Hempel, Maria Duchêne, Andrés de Segurola and Léon Rothier (1914)
- "O souverain, O juge, O père!" from Massenet's Le Cid (1916)
- "Ombra mai fu" from Handel's Xerxes (1920)
- "La Partida" (1914)

== See also ==
- Caruso sauce
- The Young Caruso, 1951 Italian film
- The Great Caruso, 1951 US film
- Opera in the United States

== Notes and references ==
Notes

=== Sources ===
- Caruso, Dorothy (1945). Enrico Caruso: His Life and Death. discography by Jack Caidin. New York: Simon and Schuster.
- Caruso, Enrico Jr.; Farkas, Andrew (1990). Enrico Caruso: My Father and My Family. discography by William Moran, chronology by Tom Kaufman. Portland: Amadeus Press.
- Greenfeld, Howard (1983). Caruso. New York: G.P. Putnam's Sons. ISBN 0-399-12736-4.
- Jackson, Stanley (1972). Caruso. New York: Stein and Day.
- Marafioti, Pasqual Mario (1922). Caruso's Method of Voice Production: The Scientific Culture of the Voice. New York, London: D. Appleton & Company – via Internet Archive. Reprint. Dover. 1981. ISBN 978-0-486-24180-7.
- Key, Pierre van Rensselaer [at Wikidata]; Zirato, Bruno (1922). Enrico Caruso, a Biography. Boston: Little, Brown and Co. Reprinted 1972, Vienna House ISBN 9780844300740
- Scott, Michael (1991), The Great Caruso, Random House, ISBN 978-0-517-06766-6
