= Terzi =

Terzi is an Italian surname and Turkish surname. Notable people with the surname include:

- Al Terzi (fl. 1968), news anchor
- Aleardo Terzi (1870–1943), Italian illustrator and poster artist
- Amedeo John Engel Terzi (1872–1956), Italian scientific illustrator and entomologist
- Andrea Terzi (1842–1918), Italian painter and engraver
- Antonia Terzi (born 1971), Italian aerodynamicist
- Claudio Terzi, (born 1984), Italian footballer
- Cristoforo Terzi (1692–1743), Italian painter
- Filippo Terzi (1520–1597), Italian military and civil architect and engineer
- Francesco Terzi (c. 1525–1600), Italian painter
- Francesco Lana de Terzi (c. 1631–1687), Italian Jesuit and aeronautics pioneer
- Gianna Terzi (born 1980), Greek singer and songwriter
- Giulia Terzi (born 1995), Italian swimmer
- Giulio Terzi di Sant'Agata (born 1946), Italian diplomat and politician
- Ludwig, Baron of Terzi (1740–1800), Austrian general
- Margherita Terzi (fl. mid-18th century), Venetian pastellist of the eighteenth century
- Mehmet Terzi, (born 1955), Turkish marathon runner
- Orhan Terzi (born 1965), known as DJ Quicksilver, Turkish-born German DJ and music producer
- Semih Terzi (died 2016), officer in the Turkish Army, shot dead during the 2016 coup d'état attempt
- Zuhdi Labib Terzi (1924–2006), Palestinian Ambassador to the United Nations

== See also ==
- Terzis
- The Tailor (TV series), a Turkish TV series also known as Terzi
