= EYE Institut Filmmuseum =

Museum in Amsterdam, the Netherlands

Eye Film Institute Netherlands

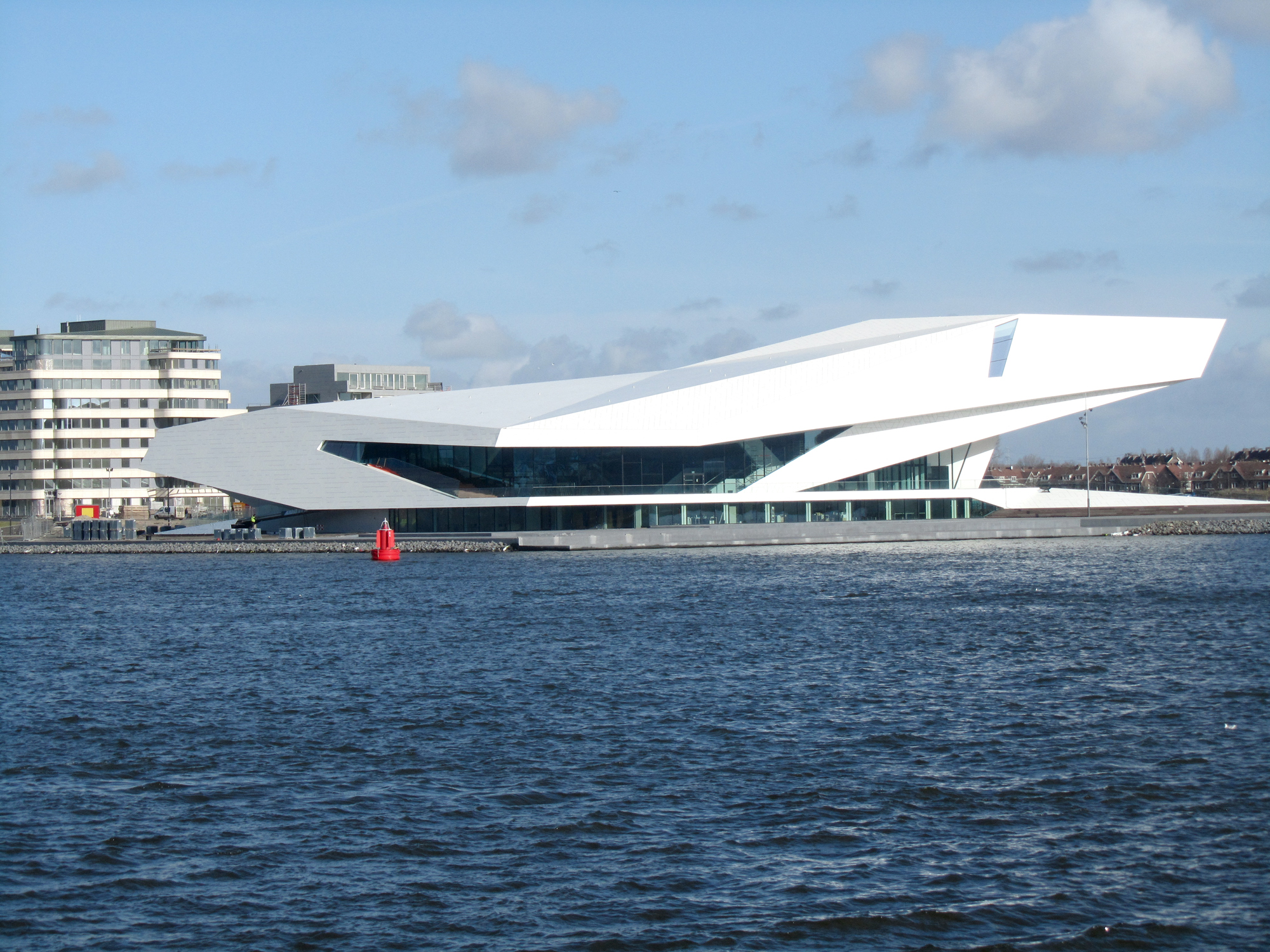
- Eye Film Institute Netherlands in 2012

- Location in Amsterdam
- Established: 1952; 74 years ago
- Location: IJpromenade 1, Amsterdam, the Netherlands
- Coordinates: 52°23′04″N 4°54′02″E
- Type: Film archive National museum Art museum History museum
- Collection size: 820,000 objects
- Public transit access: North exit of Amsterdam Central Station, ferry across IJ
- Website: eyefilm.nl

Eye Filmmuseum is a film archive, museum, and cinema in Amsterdam that preserves and presents both Dutch and foreign films screened in the Netherlands.

== Location and history ==
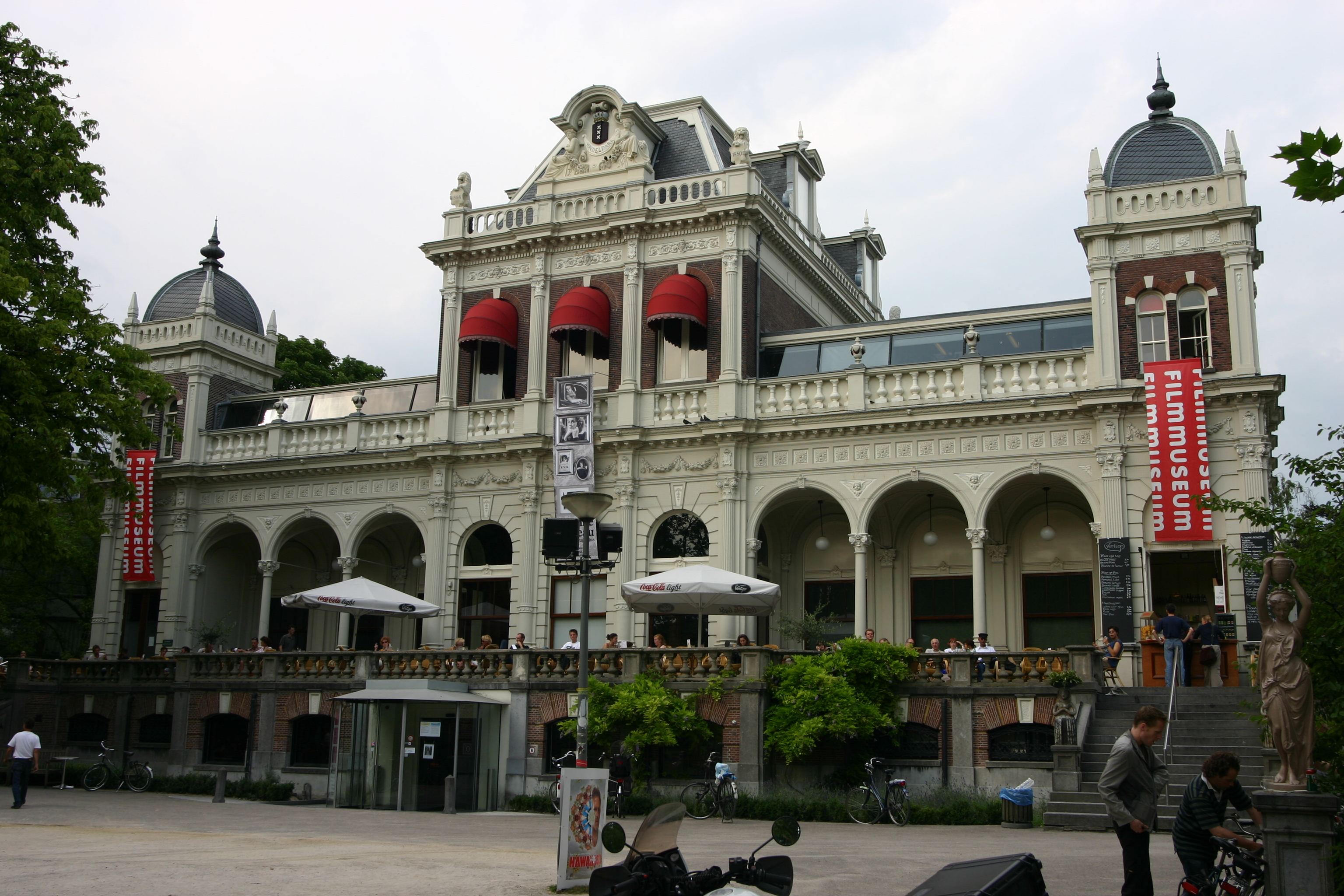
Vondelparkpaviljoen, the location of the Netherlands Filmmuseum from 1975 to 2012.

Eye Filmmuseum is located in the Overhoeks neighborhood of Amsterdam in the Netherlands. Its predecessor was the Dutch Historical Film Archive, founded in 1946 by David van Staveren, Felix Halverstad, and directors of Filmtheater Kriterion Piet Meerburg and Paul Kijzer. Following the accession of the archives of the Filmtheater de Uitkijk, the archive was renamed the Netherlands Filmmuseum under the leadership of its first director, film collector Jan de Vaal. The Filmmuseum was located in Kriterion and Stedelijk Museum until 1975, when de Vaal succeeded in acquiring a discrete space for the Filmmuseum in the Vondelpark Pavilion. In 2009, Nederlands Filmmuseum merged with Holland Film, the Netherlands Institute for Film Education and the Filmbank and plans were announced for a new home on the north bank of Amsterdam's waterfront. The Filmmuseum was renamed the Eye Film Institute Netherlands and was officially opened on 4 April 2012, by Queen Beatrix.

== Buildings ==
=== Eye Filmmuseum ===
The Eye Filmmuseum building is designed by Delugan Meissl Associated Architects, whose other projects include the Porsche Museum in Stuttgart. The building features two gallery exhibition spaces, one 300-seat cinema, two 127-seat cinemas, and a fourth intimate cinema of about 67 seats. One of the gallery spaces is devoted to a permanent exhibition on the technical and aesthetic histories of cinema. The exhibit includes historical equipment drawn from the Museum's collection of approximately 1,500 cinematic apparatuses, as well as an immersive presentation of about one hundred film clips from the Museum's archive, including Dutch and international films dating from the silent era and beyond. The second gallery space is dedicated to experimental cinema or expanded cinema, a commitment which dates back to the Filmmuseum's founding and the weekly screenings it organized at the Stedelijk Museum in the 1950s under the emerging aegis of cinema as a "seventh art." Past exhibitions in this space have focused on auteurs and cinematographers, as well as video artists and visual artists like Ryoji Ikeda and Anthony McCall.

=== Eye Collection Center ===
In 2016, Eye opened its new Collection Center, designed by cepezed. The collection is made up of analog, digitized, and born-digital materials which are situated beside a sound restoration and digitization studio, a digital image restoration studio, and a grading and scanning suite. The collection includes 210,000 cans of acetate film, 57,000 film titles, 2.5 petabytes of digital data, 82,000 posters, 700,000 photographs, 27,000 books, 2,000 journals, 1,500 pre-cinema and film apparatuses, 4,500 magic lantern slides, 7,000 musical scores, and 250,000 press cuttings.

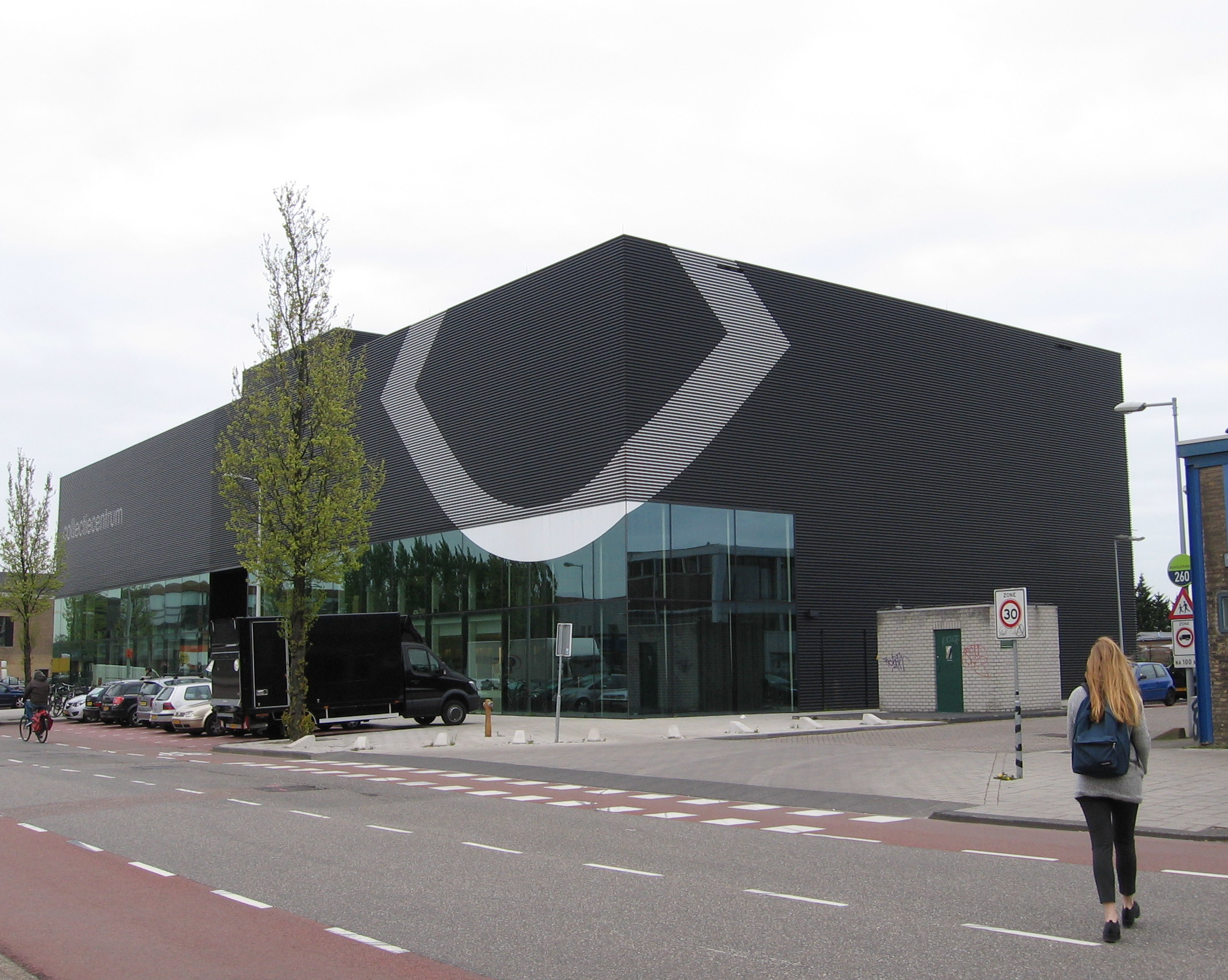
Collection building of Eye Film Institute Netherlands, Asterweg, Amsterdam.

The collection originally consisted of films from the Uitkijk archive, compiled by members of the Dutch Filmliga (1927–1933). After joining the International Federation of Film archives (FIAF) in 1947, the Filmmuseum started to actively collect and preserve Dutch film productions. Since then, a number of significant collections have been acquired, ranging from Dutch distributors (Desmet, Centra, and UIP); filmmakers (Joris Ivens, Johan van der Keuken, and Louis van Gasteren); and producers (Matthijs van Heijningen and Kees Kasander) to institutions and organizations, such as the Netherlands Film Academy; the Netherlands Film Fund; and the Netherlands Institute for Animation Film (NIAf). The collection also includes many seminal silent film works, Hollywood classics, international arthouse productions, and independent filmmakers of international renown.

=== Nitrate Bunkers ===
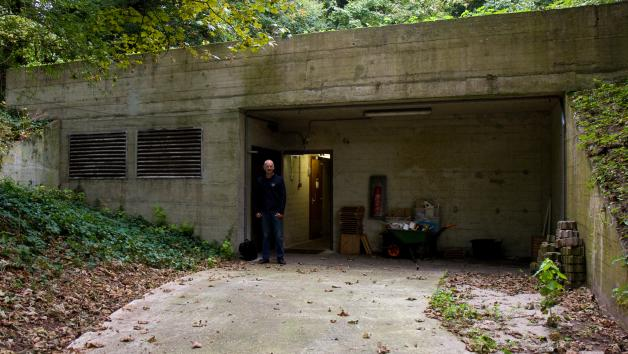
Martin van Leuven, Eye's Collection Manager for Film, standing before the nitrate bunker in Overveen.

Eye stores 30,000 cans of flammable nitrate film in bunkers near the coast of North Holland in Overveen, Castricum and Heemskerk. These nitrate films date between 1896 and the mid-1950s and include a unique collection of 68mm film. Two of these bunkers were built during the Second World War to protect Dutch art museum holdings from theft and destruction; Rembrandt's The Night Watch was among a few of the paintings which were stored in the Castricum bunker for part of the war.

== Restorations ==
Recent silent film Eye restorations include the formerly lost film Beyond the Rocks (1922) starring Gloria Swanson, J'accuse! (1919) by Abel Gance, The Seashell and the Clergyman (1928) by Germain Dulac, Raskolnikov (1923) by Robert Wiene, Flower of Evil (1915) by Carmine Gallone, and Shoes (1916) by Lois Weber.

Restorations of Dutch films include Wan Pipel (1976) by Dutch-Surinamese director Pim de la Parra, Zeemansvrouwen (1930) by Henk Kleinmann, Karakter (1997) by Mike van Diem, Spetters (1980) by Paul Verhoeven, and Abel (1986) by Alex van Warmerdam.

Other restorations include Eve (1962) by Joseph Losey, M (1931) by Fritz Lang, and We Can't Go Home Again (1979) by Nicholas Ray.

== Projects ==
In 2010, Eye launched a major film digitization and preservation project together with IBM and Thought Equity Motion, a provider of video platform and rights development services. The project involves scanning and storing more than 150 million discrete DPX files on LTO Gen5 Tape in the Linear Tape File System format.

The institute's youth platform is named MovieZone (previously MovieSquad).

== Annual events ==
- International Documentary Film Festival Amsterdam (November)
- Eye International Conference (May)

== Publications ==
In 2009, in collaboration with Amsterdam University Press (AUP), Eye began publishing academic books on restoration, preservation, archival and exhibition practices through their "Framing Film" series.

Title	Author	Year
From Grain to Pixel: The Archival Life of Film in Transition	Giovanna Fossati	2009
Watch and Learn: Rhetorical Devices in Classroom Films after 1940	Eef Masson	2012
Preserving and Exhibiting Media Art: Challenges and Perspectives	Julia Noordegraaf, Vinzenz Hediger, Cosetta Saba, Barbara Le Maitre	2013
Light Image Imagination	Martha Blassnigg	2013
Fantasia of Color in Early Cinema	Tom Gunning, Joshua Yumibe, Giovanna Fossati and Jonathon Rosen	2015
Filming for the Future: The Work of Louis van Gasteren	Patricia Pisters	2015
Multiple Language Versions Made in BABELsberg: Ufa's International Strategy, 1929-1939	Chris Wahl	2015
Humour and Irony in Dutch Post-War Fiction Film	Peter Verstraten	2016
Exposing the Film Apparatus. The Film Archive as a Research Laboratory	Giovanna Fossati and Annie van den Oever	2016
The Conscience of Cinema. The Works of Joris Ivens 1912-1989	Thomas Waugh	2016
Women in Silent Cinema. History of Fame and Failure	Annette Förster	2017
The Film Museum Practice and Film Historiography. The Case of the Nederlands Filmmuseum (1946–2000)	Bregt Lameris	2017
Images of Occupation in Dutch Film. Memory, Myth, and the Cultural Legacy of War	Wendy Burke	2017
The Films of Bill Morisson. Aesthetics of the Archive	Bernd Herzogenrath	2017
The Colour Fantastic: Chromatic Worlds of Silent Cinema	Giovanna Fossati, Victoria Jackson, Bregt Lameris, Elif Rongen-Kaynakçi, Sarah Street and Joshua Yumibe	2018
The Greatest Films Never Seen. The Film Archive and the Copyright Smokescreen	Claudy Op den Kamp	2018
Images of Dutchness. Early cinema, Popular Visual Culture and the Emergence of a National Cliché, 1800-1914	Sarah Dellmann	2018
Performing Moving Images. Access, Archive, Affects	Senta Siewert	2020

== Collection ==
The Adopted Brother by Christy Cabanne and D.W. Griffith. Silent film, 1913. Running time: 10:41

Charlie in Turkey, silent animation by Pat Sullivan, 1916. 9:39

Flight tests with the helicopter Pescara 2R of Raúl Pateras Pescara. Silent film 1922. 1:25.

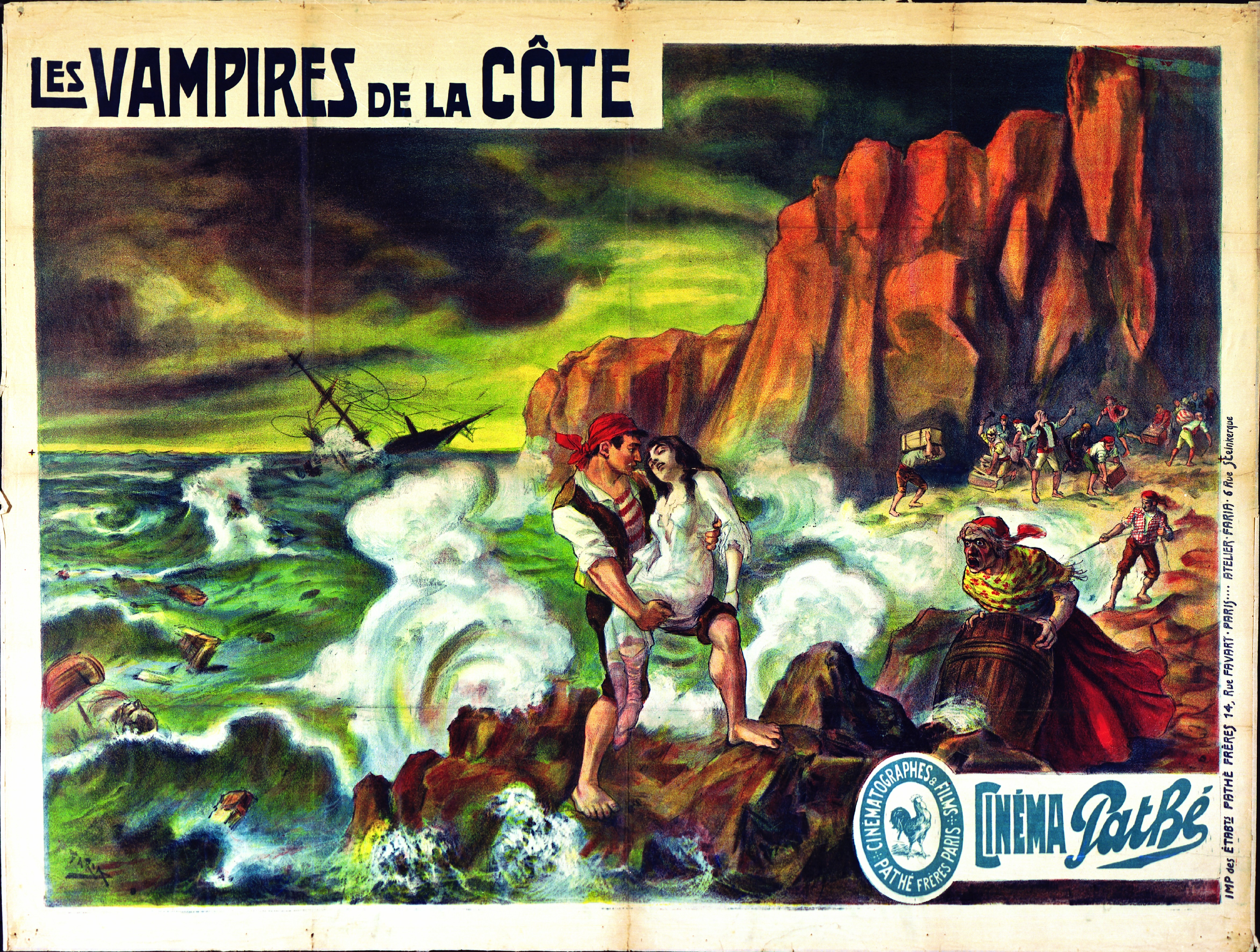
Poster by Cândido de Faria for the silent Pathé Frères film Les Vampires de la côte, 1908

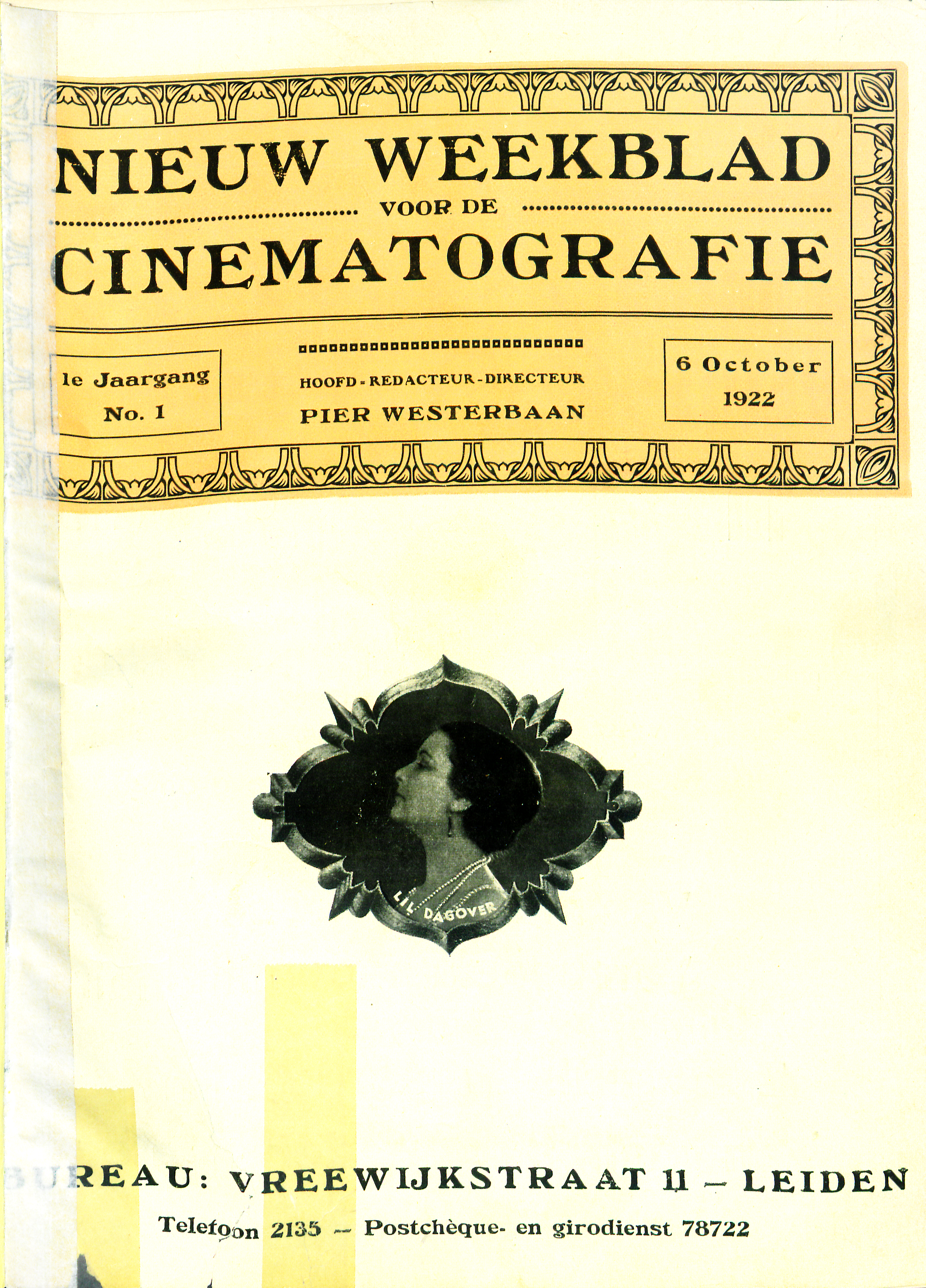
Nieuw Weekblad voor de Cinematografie 1, 6 oktober 1922. Dutch weekly of cinematography.

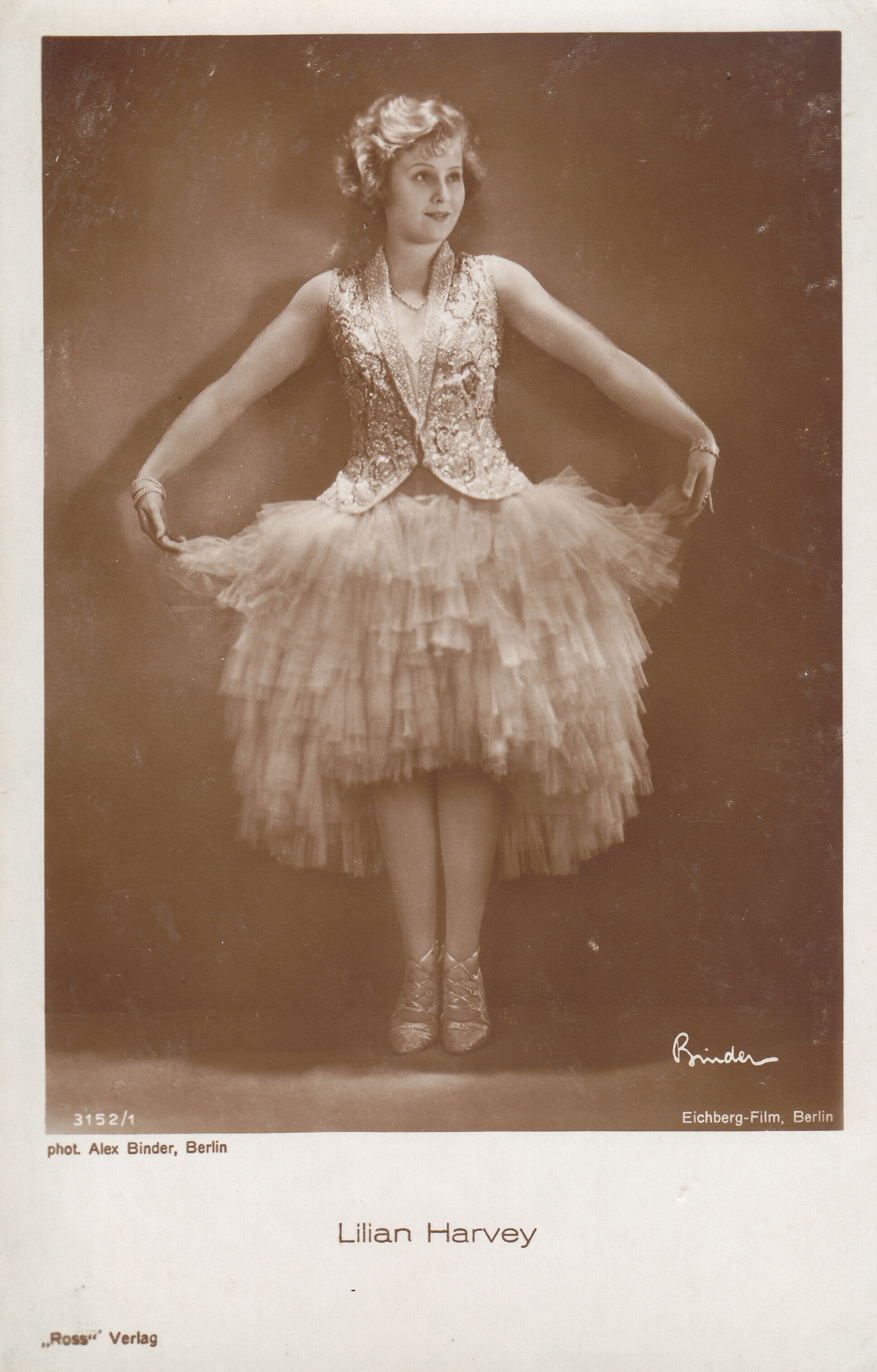
Filmstar Lilian Harvey by Alexander Binder, 1920s

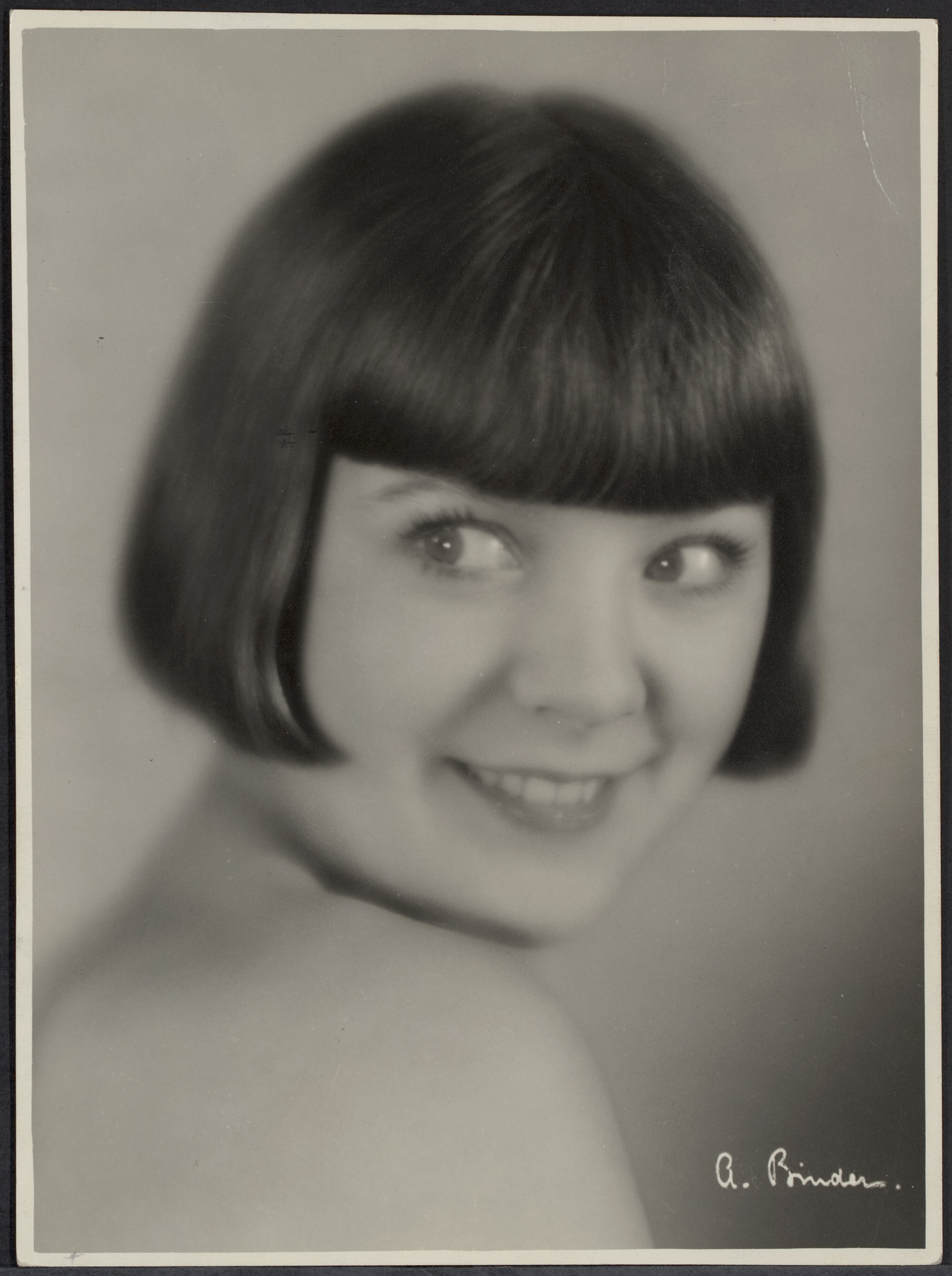
Filmstar Truus van Aalten by Alexander Binder, 1920s

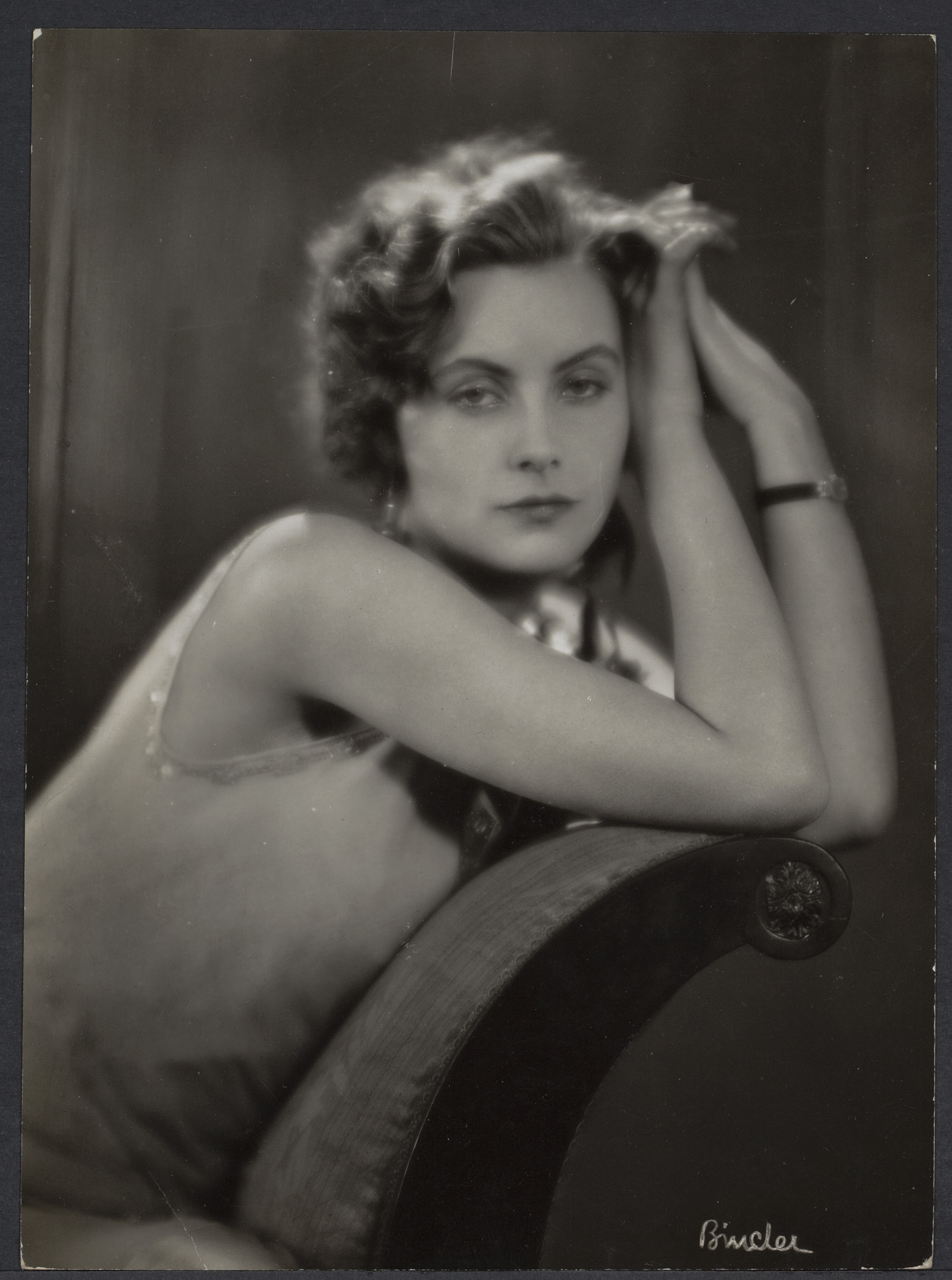
Filmstar Greta Garbo by Alexander Binder, 1920s

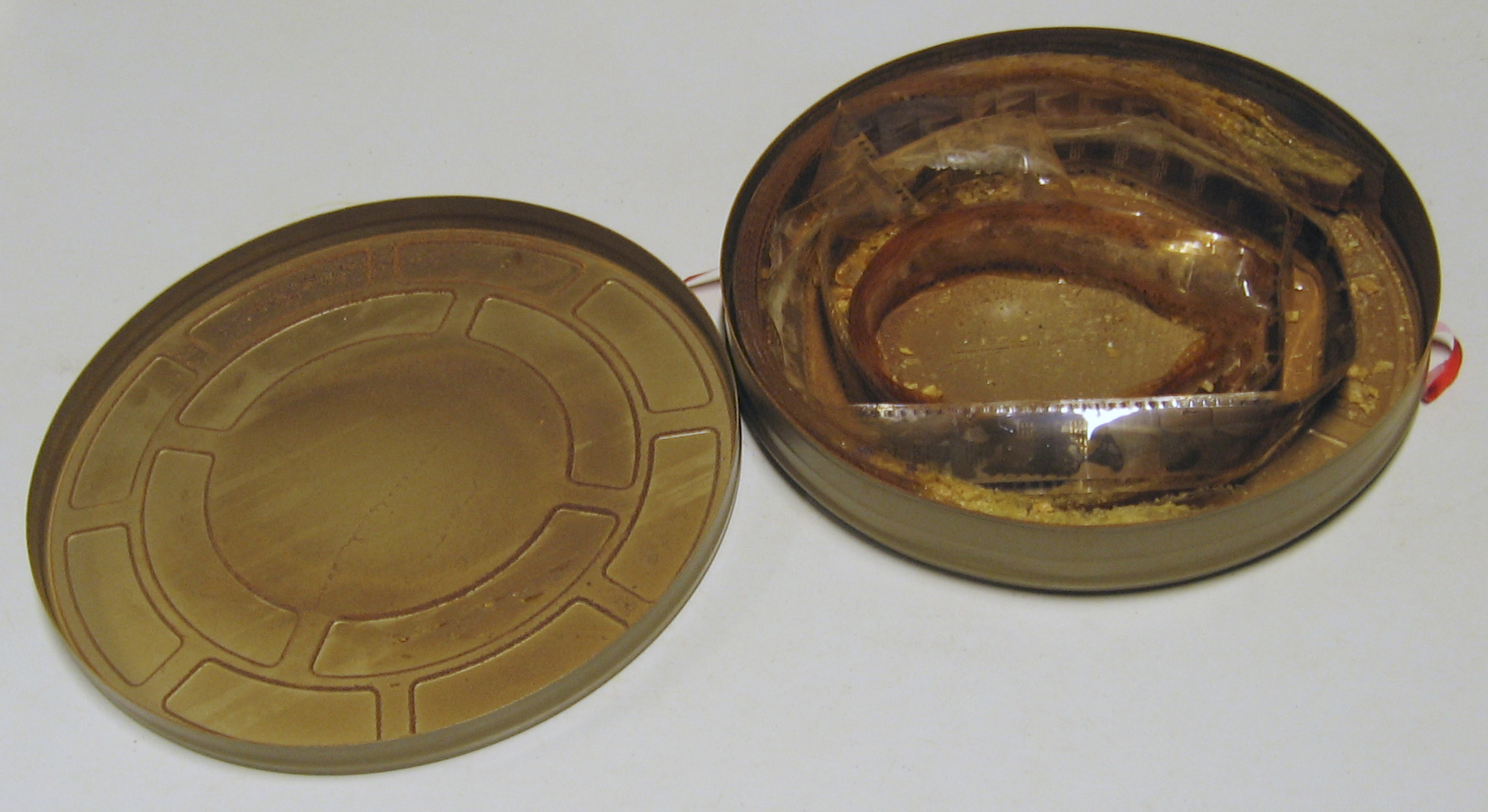
Film restoration

== See also ==
- List of film archives
- Association of European Film Archives and Cinematheques
- List of museums in Amsterdam
