= Belvidere Discount Mall =

- Location: Waukegan, Illinois, United States
- Coordinates: 42.34927°N 87.85859°W
- Address: Belvidere Street
- Opened: November 18, 1965
- Previous names: Belvidere Mall
- Owner: Imperial Realty
- Num. of anchor tenants: 1
- Floors: 1
- Public transit: Pace

Belvidere Discount Mall is a shopping mall located on Belvidere Street in Waukegan, Illinois, United States. It was one of the first shopping malls in the Chicago metropolitan area, and the first enclosed shopping mall in Lake County. Its current main anchor store is a Home Depot. The mall is notable for reinventing itself over time to remain open, with a current store mix.

== History ==
Belvidere Mall opened on November 18, 1965, and was Lake County's first enclosed shopping mall. At its opening, it contained 35 stores and 300,000 square feet (28,000 m^{2}). The anchor store was Montgomery Ward department store, which had formerly been located in downtown Waukegan.

While the mall thrived at first, the opening of the much larger nearby Lakehurst Mall in 1971 put a serious dent in Belvidere's fortunes. In 1988, sole anchor Montgomery Ward left for Lakehurst Mall. After about seven years of being empty, Builders Square occupied the anchor spot in 1995, and was replaced with Home Depot around 2000.

The mall has been renovated twice, in 1985 and again in 1998. The mall is currently owned by Imperial Realty, who purchased it from original owners Landuau & Heyman Inc. in the fall of 1985. As part of the 1998 renovation, the mall was renamed Belvidere Discount Mall.

Today, Belvidere Mall differs from Lake County's other shopping malls, Gurnee Mills and Hawthorn Mall, because all of the tenants, except for The Home Depot, are family-owned. Nearly all of them are Hispanic-owned or Hispanic-oriented. Since 2019 the mall also embraced artists and creators in Waukegan, frequently lending vacant retail spaces and its concourses for vendor fairs and popup shops.

=== Belvidere Cinema ===
A single-screen 1,000-seat movie theater opened at the mall on January 21, 1966 with Do Not Disturb as its opening feature. It was originally operated by the General Cinema Corporation. In early 1980 the theater was twinned. The Cinema closed in 1989, with the mall in decline and General Cinema expanding the nearby Lakehurst Cinema to 12 screens.

In 1991, Imperial Realty twinned the Belvidere Cinema again to form a four-screen "miniplex" and reopened it as a discount theater. In 2002, the Belvidere Theatres joined the reopened Lakehurst Cinemas as part of the Village Theaters chain, however Village closed the Belvidere operation at the end of 2003. The theatres remained unused until hosting public tours and art exhibits in 2019 and 2020. Since November 2021 the theater functions as a DIY venue known as Belvidere Cinema Gallery with monthly revival and independent screenings, local art exhibits and occasional live music.

=== Redevelopment & closure ===
In 2026, a real-estate listing for the site showed plans for a 364,120-square-foot industrial building at 2107 Belvidere Road, with availability beginning February 1, 2027.
