= Terzioğlu =

Terzioğlu is a Turkish surname. It is an occupational surname of patronymic derivation: Terzi (tailor) + -oğlu (son of)

Notable people with the surname include:

- Burçin Terzioğlu (born 1980), Turkish actress
- Hayri Terzioğlu (1908–1976), Turkish businessman
- Merve Terzioğlu (1987–2008), Turkish swimmer
- Nazım Terzioglu (1912–1976), Turkish mathematician
- Tosun Terzioğlu (1942−2016), Turkish mathematician

== See also ==
- Terzi
- Terzis
