= Lakehurst =

There are a number of places named Lakehurst:

- Lakehurst, New Jersey
- Lakehurst High School, a fictional school in Degrassi: The Next Generation
- Lakehurst Mall, a defunct shopping complex in Waukegan, Illinois
- Naval Air Engineering Station Lakehurst, the location of the Hindenburg Disaster
