= Revival house =

Cinema that shows older films

A revival house, rep house, or repertory cinema is a cinema that specializes in showing classic or notable older films (as opposed to first run films). Such venues may include standard repertory cinemas, multi-function theatres that alternate between old movies and live events, and some first-run theatres that show past favorites alongside current independent films.

== List of revival houses ==
=== North America ===
==== Canada ====
- Calgary, AB Globe Cinema
- Calgary, AB Plaza Theatre
- Charlottetown, PE City Cinema
- Charlottetown, PE Tivoli Cinema
- Edmonton, AB Metro Cinema
- Hamilton, ON The Westdale
- Hamilton, ON Playhouse Cinema
- Halifax, NS Carbon Arc Cinema
- London, ON Hyland Cinema
- Montréal, QC Cinéma du Parc
- Montréal, QC La Cinémathèque québécoise
- Montréal, QC Dollar Cinema
- Montréal, QC Cinéma Moderne
- Ottawa, ON ByTowne Cinema
- Ottawa, ON Mayfair Theatre
- Saskatoon, SK Broadway Theatre
- Toronto, ON Bloor Cinema
- Toronto, ON Paradise Theatre
- Toronto, ON Revue Cinema
- Toronto, ON Royal Cinema
- Vancouver, BC Rio Theatre
- Vancouver, BC The Cinematheque
- Victoria, BC Cinecenta
- Victoria, BC The Vic Theatre
- Waterloo, ON Princess Cinemas
- Winnipeg, MB Dave Barber Cinematheque

==== United States ====
- Atlanta, GA, Plaza Theatre
- Baltimore, MD, The Charles Theatre
- Brooklyn, NY, Spectacle Theater
- Brooklyn, NY, Nitehawk Cinema
- Boston, MA, Brattle Theatre
- Boston, MA, Coolidge Corner Theatre
- Boston, MA, Harvard Film Archive
- Bryn Mawr, PA, Bryn Mawr Film Institute
- Chicago, IL, Gene Siskel Film Center
- Chicago, IL, Music Box Theatre
- Chicago, IL, Doc Films
- Cleveland, OH, Cleveland Cinematheque
- Columbus, OH, Gateway Film Center
- Columbus, OH, Studio 35
- Dallas, TX, Texas Theatre
- Denver, CO, Sie FilmCenter
- Detroit, MI, Redford Theatre
- El Segundo, CA, Old Town Music Hall
- Fillmore, CA, Fillmore Town Theatre
- Houston, TX, Brown Theater
- Lexington, Kentucky Theater
- Los Angeles, CA, Brain Dead Studios
- Los Angeles, CA, Grauman's Egyptian Theatre
- Los Angeles, CA, Los Feliz 3
- Los Angeles, CA, New Beverly Cinema
- Los Angeles, CA, Ted Mann Theater
- Los Angeles, CA, Vista Theatre (Los Angeles)
- Manhattan, NY, Anthology Film Archives
- Manhattan, NY, Film Forum
- Manhattan, NY, IFC Center
- Manhattan, NY, Metrograph
- Milwaukee, WI, Oriental Theatre
- Minneapolis, MN, Trylon Cinema
- Norfolk, VA, NARO Expanded Cinema
- Omaha, NE, Dundee Theater
- Palo Alto, CA, Stanford Theatre
- Pittsburgh, PA, Harris Theater
- Pittsburgh, PA, Row House Cinema
- Philadelphia, PA, Lightbox Film Center
- Philadelphia, PA, Philadelphia Film Center
- Philadelphia, PA, Roxy Theater
- Portland, OR, Academy Theater
- Portland, OR, Cinema 21
- Portland, OR, Cinemagic Theater
- Portland, OR, Clinton Street Theater
- Portland, OR, Hollywood Theatre
- Portland, OR, Laurelhurst Theater
- Raleigh, NC, Colony Theater
- Rochester, NY, Dryden Theatre
- Saginaw, MI, Temple Theatre
- Santa Monica, CA, Aero Theatre
- San Francisco, CA, Castro Theater
- Seattle, WA, Grand Illusion Cinema
- Tigard, OR, Joy Cinema and Pub
- Vancouver, WA, Kiggins Theatre
- Waukegan, IL, Belvidere Cinema Gallery

=== Europe ===
==== France ====
- Paris, Christine 21
- Paris, Le Champo
- Paris, Cinémathèque Française
- Paris, La Filmothèque
- Paris, Le Grand Action
- Paris, Reflet Médicis
- Paris, Le Studio Saint-Michel

==== Germany ====
- Berlin, Kino Babylon

==== The Netherlands ====
- Rotterdam, WORM
- Amsterdam, Filmtheater de Uitkijk

==== Poland ====
- Warsaw, Iluzjon Filmoteki Narodowej

==== Romania ====
- Bucharest, Arhiva Nationala de Filme - Cinemateca

==== Russia ====
- Moscow, Illuzion

==== United Kingdom ====
- Glasgow, Glasgow Film Theatre
- London, BFI Southbank
- London, Prince Charles Cinema
- London, Regent Street Cinema
- London, Close-Up Film Centre
- Coventry, Warwick Student Cinema

=== Australia ===
- Adelaide, Mercury Cinema (Adelaide Cinémathèque)
- Hobart, Rewind Cinema
- Melbourne, Astor Theatre
- Melbourne, Sun Theatre
- Perth - Como Theatre
- Sydney, Randwick Ritz

=== Africa ===
==== South Africa ====
- Gardens, Cape Town, Labia Theatre
- Johannesburg, The Bioscope
