= Noordegraaf =

Noordegraaf is a Dutch surname. Notable people with the surname include:

- Ab Noordegraaf (1933–2011), Dutch pastor and writer
- Eric Noordegraaf (born 1960), Dutch water polo player and Olympian
- Jan Noordegraaf (1927–1990), Dutch translator and writer
- Julia Noordegraaf (born 1972), Dutch scholar of digital culture
- Leo Noordegraaf (born 1949), Dutch economic and social historian
- Wim Noordegraaf (born 1952), Dutch puppeteer
