= Circle Theatre (Washington DC) =

Theatres in United States

Coordinates: 38.90173°N 77.04695°W

The Circle Theatre on Pennsylvania Avenue, NW, in Washington, D.C. was designed by Albert B. Mullett & Co. and opened in March 1910. It had previously been a store in a three-story Federal style building.

Believed to be the District's first continuously operating movie theatre, it was the first to feature repertory films.

== History ==
The Circle Theatre opened in 1910, and was renovated and enlarged in 1935 in the Art Deco style. In the 1970s and 1980s, it was a 670-seat revival house theatre. From 1968 to 1986, the adjacent Inner Circle Theater ran mostly first-run art and foreign films. The theatre closed in September 1986 and was demolished. Brothers Ted and Jim Pedas owned the theatre since 1957. By 1980, their Circle Theatres chain had 36 screens in Washington, D.C. and its suburbs.
