= Princess Cinemas =

Cinema in Waterloo, Ontario

Original Princess Cinema
- Princess Cinemas logo as of 2025

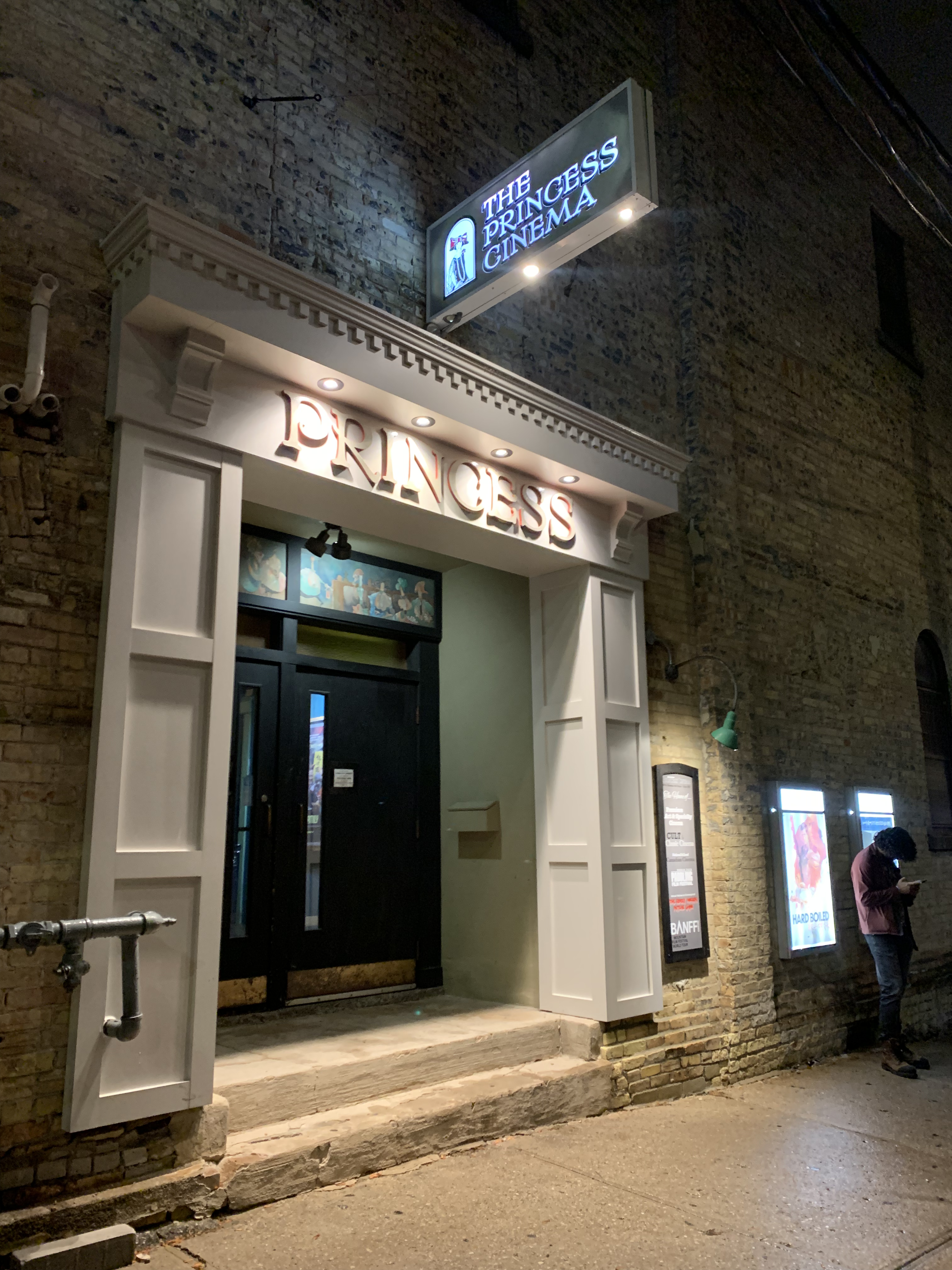
- Exterior of the Original Princess Cinema taken November 25, 2025.
- Interactive map of the Original Princess Cinema area
- Former names: Princess Cinema, Majesty Theatre

General information
- Location: Waterloo, Ontario, Canada, 6 Princess Street West
- Coordinates: 43.4669°N 80.5233°W
- Year built: 1844
- Landlord: Sonia and Bernie Adlys

Website
- princesscinemas.com

The Princess Cinemas are two independent cinemas located around the corner from each other in Waterloo, Ontario, Canada. The first theatre is a single-screen, 174-seat cinema now known as the Original Princess Cinema that opened in 1985 at 6 Princess Street West, behind the Huether Hotel. The second theatre is a two-screen, 280-seat cinema called the Princess Twin Cinema which opened in 2005 at 46 King Street North. They are owned and operated by the Tutt family who also owns the Playhouse Cinema in Hamilton, Ontario.

== History ==
=== Origins (1985–2003) ===
The building at 6 Princess St (now the Original Princess Cinema) began as the Lion's Brewery in the 19th century, part of a building complex that included the adjoining Huether Hotel. The building was converted briefly into a Masonic Temple and then an adult film theatre called the Majestic Theatre in the early 20th century. The Majestic was routinely protested by members of the community throughout its existence. The rise in adult video content viewable at home throughout the 1970s led to the Majestic's closure in 1980.

Dr. Linda Carson attempted to establish a live theatre venue in the building called Waterworks Theatre in 1983. She initially thought the annual operating budget would be around $50,000 but after 6 months of developing her business plan realized they would be closer to $430,000, leading her to withdraw her offer to purchase the theatre. The building was eventually sold to Huether Hotel owners Sonia and Bernie Adlys on December 24,1984 for an undisclosed amount of money.

The Princess Cinema was conceived by Laurier University business grad John Tutt (who minored in film) in 1983 while he was reviewing experimental films at the KW Art Gallery. He had tried to work with Dr. Carson on the Waterworks Theatre , but after that failed to materialize he decided to pursue his cinema idea for the space. He received $5,000 () from Ontario Youth Venture Capital, acquired a few investors and took out a $19,000 bank loan to start the business himself.

Tutt told reporters in its opening week that the cinema was operating "on a shoe-string budget" but that they still managed to procure the then 192-seat theatre, a new sound system and projection equipment including a 9x18 foot screen. The Princess Cinema was open 7 days a week from opening day and sold tickets for $3.75 ($9.75 CAD in 2025). Patrons who bought a $5 ($13 in 2025) year-long membership, or $3 ($7.80 in 2025) for students, could get tickets for $2.75 ($7.15 in 2025).

The Princess Cinema officially opened September 18, 1985 with a screening of Michael Curtiz's classic romance film Casablanca (1942). In its first few weeks of business they also screened Alfred Hitchcock's Vertigo (1958), Nicholas Ray's Rebel Without a Cause (1955) and cult hits like Eraserhead (1977) and Brother from Another Planet (1984).

The Princess Cinema was also a venue for many musical acts in addition to screening films. In August 1986 they hosted future Juno award winner Willie P. Bennett for an intimate concert with about 40 patrons. The Princess participated annually in the KW Jazz Fest, hosting musical acts and screening jazz films.

The Princess premiered many local films shot in Waterloo, such as Sergio Navarretta's Over a Small Cup of Coffee (2000) and James Muir's In Camera (2001).

The theatre closed for renovations in late 2000 and re-opened in January 2001 with 177 new seats and a new sound system.

Beginning in 2000 the Princess began awarding a student in University of Waterloo's film studies program an annual Princess Cinemas Award granting the winner 30 movie passes.

In 2000, the Princess Cinemas began hosting the annual Rainbow Reels Queer Film Festival, showcasing queer movies from Canada and around the world.

=== Opening of second cinema and rebranding of original (2003–2019) ===
John Tutt and Jeff Zavitz, chair of the Uptown Vision committee, took possession of the Alan Rigby House of Furniture on April 1, 2003 and spent the next 2 years renovating the building into a two-screen cinema, as well as space for other tenants. Tutt says the expansion came as a result of their inability to screen all the movies they wanted to with their single-screen cinema.

To celebrate the coming expansion and their 18th anniversary as a business, the Princess Cinema held a free screening of Morton DaCosta's The Music Man (1962) on September 18, 2003 with free birthday cake for attendees.

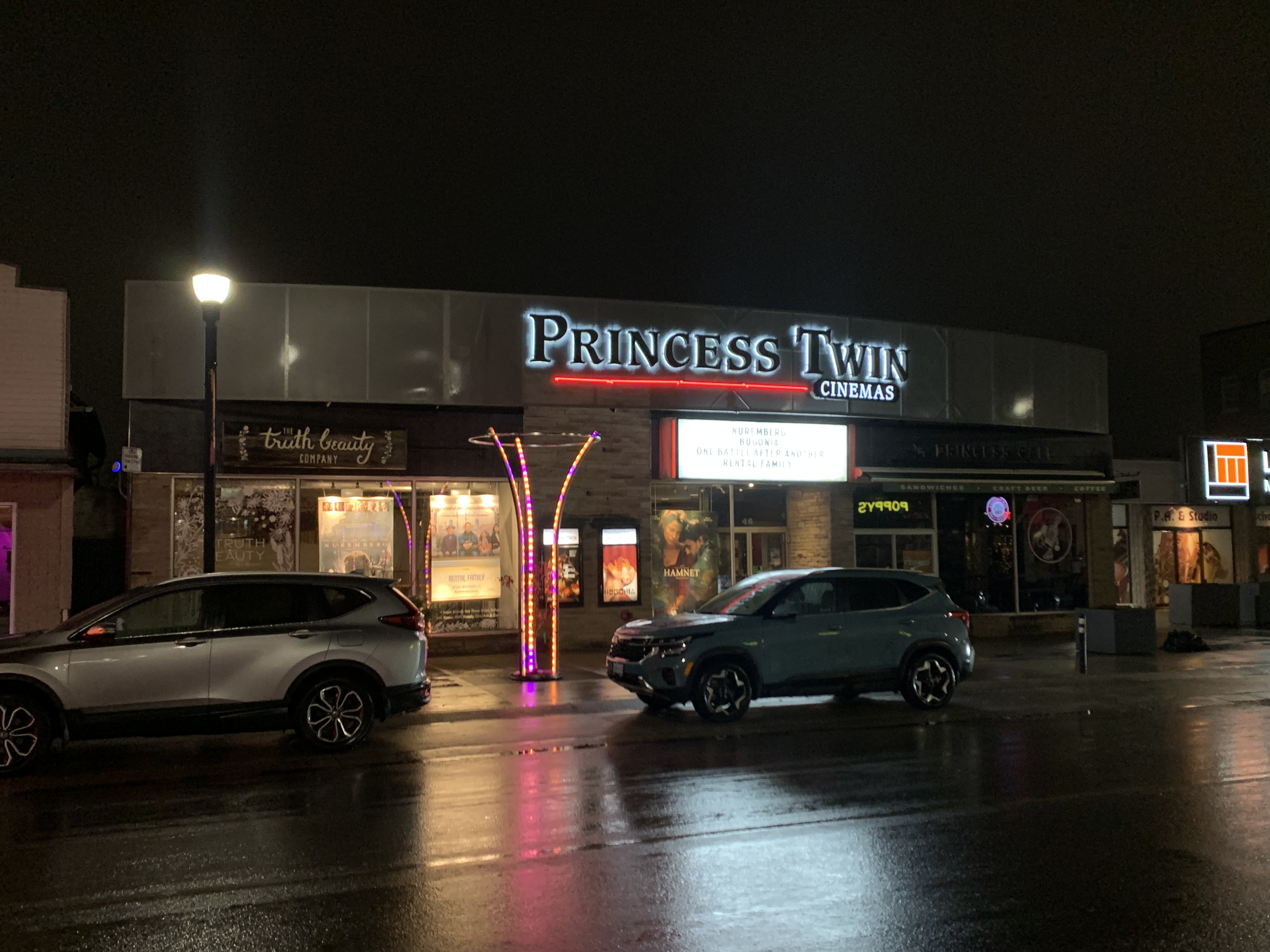
Princess Twin Cinema exterior taken November 25, 2025/

The Princess Twin Cinema officially opened in January 2005. In February 2005 the Twin Princess begain hosting baby-friendly Wednesday film screenings which had changing tables, bottle warmers, door prizes and free entrance for infants.

The Princess continued premiereing local films throughout the 2000s and 2010s. They premiered Roger Albrecht's Solarwind (2004), Waterluvian Marshall Ward's documentary Love Will Set You Free (2005) which focueses on The Northern Pikes' vocalist Jay Semko and more recently Kai Reimer-Watts' climate change documentary Beyond Crisis (2017).

=== Expansion to Hamilton and business transfer (2019–present) ===
In 2017, the Tutt family acquired the century-old Playhouse Cinema in Hamilton's North Stipley neighbourhood, which hadn't been operating as a traditional cinema for almost 30 years. After 2 years spent renovating and updating the facilities they re-opened as the Playhouse Cinema and extended the annual membership discount from the Princess Twin Cinemas to the Playhouse. They also put their son Jacob Tutt in charge as manager. Jacob had been working at the Princess Cinemas since he was 13, moving from serving popcorn to projectionist to manager.

In April 2019, the landlord of the Original Princess Cinema, the Huether Hotel, served the tenants with a notice to evict the premises within 2 months citing a 30% increase in property taxes and an increase in their insurance rates as justification. The Landlord announced a new tenant would be moving in and paying double the current rent. The Princess was not given an opportunity to renegotiate their lease. After an intense community backlash to the announcement, the landlord reversed their decision to evict the Original Princess Cinema and allowed them to remain open.

In 2023, the Princess Twin Cinemas hosted a month-long screening of Matt Johnson's dramaticized historical film Blackberry (2023). The cinema also held a community day screening of the film attended by the film's director, producer, as well as many ex-Blackberry engineers, employees and their families still living in Waterloo.

In 2024, John Tutt and his wife, co-owner and business partner Wendy Tutt, handed off the day-to-day business operations to Jacob and Sopia Irwin, a Laurier University film studies graduate who worked her way up from the Princess Cinemas concession stand to become cinema programmer and assistant manager Sophia Irwin, a Laurier University film studies graduate. John remains co-owner and part of the business in a part-time advisory role.

In September 2025, the Princess Twin Cinemas celebrated 40 years of doing business with a well-attended block party, as well as a screening of Jonathan Demme's Talking Heads concert film Stop Making Sense (1984) and their usual annual screening of Casablanca (1942).
