= Joy Cinema and Pub =

Cinema in Tigard, Oregon, U.S.

Coordinates: 45.4339°N 122.7659°W

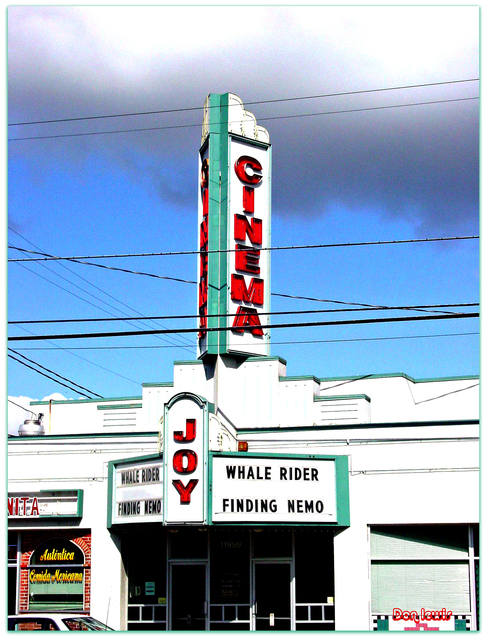
- The Joy Theater circa 2003
- Interactive map of Joy Cinema and Pub
- Former names: Joy Theater (1939-2012)
- Address: 11959 SW Pacific Highway; Tigard; United States
- Capacity: 485
- Screens: 1

Construction
- Opened: 1939

Website
- https://thejoycinema.com/

The Joy Cinema and Pub, formerly known as the Joy Theater, is a single-screen repertory cinema located in Tigard, Oregon, United States.

== History ==
The Joy Cinema and Pub originally went by the name Joy Theater, and was established in 1939. The Joy's specialty was second-run or offbeat movies, and was known for many years for being one of the only theaters in the Portland Metro Area to play Bollywood films. In 2010, the theater was owned by Arif Amaani, a Seattle-based businessman who also ran a theater that showed primarily Indian films in Seattle.

In 2012, The Joy Theater was sold to advertising agent Jeff "Punk Rock" Martin, who renamed it to the Joy Cinema and Pub, as well as remodeling the interior to fit the kitsch aesthetic of its art deco exterior façade. The theater's programming was revamped to show a mix of blockbusters, family films, and cult cinema.

During the COVID-19 pandemic, the Joy Cinema and Pub was closed for one year, and gained notoriety for selling fresh popcorn and concessions while Washington County law dictated that the theater could not show movies.

== Programming ==
The theater alternates between first-run, second-run, and repertory showings.

The theater also hosts occasional "Weird Wednesday" screenings, which are free, late night showings of films that are either in the public domain or had a questionable legal status, such as Nosferatu and Santa Claus Conquers the Martians.

In 2023, the Joy Cinema and Pub introduced a new "Midnight Movies" event, showing cult films at Midnight on Fridays.
