= Lakehurst Cinemas =

Coordinates: 42°20′22″N 87°53′48″W

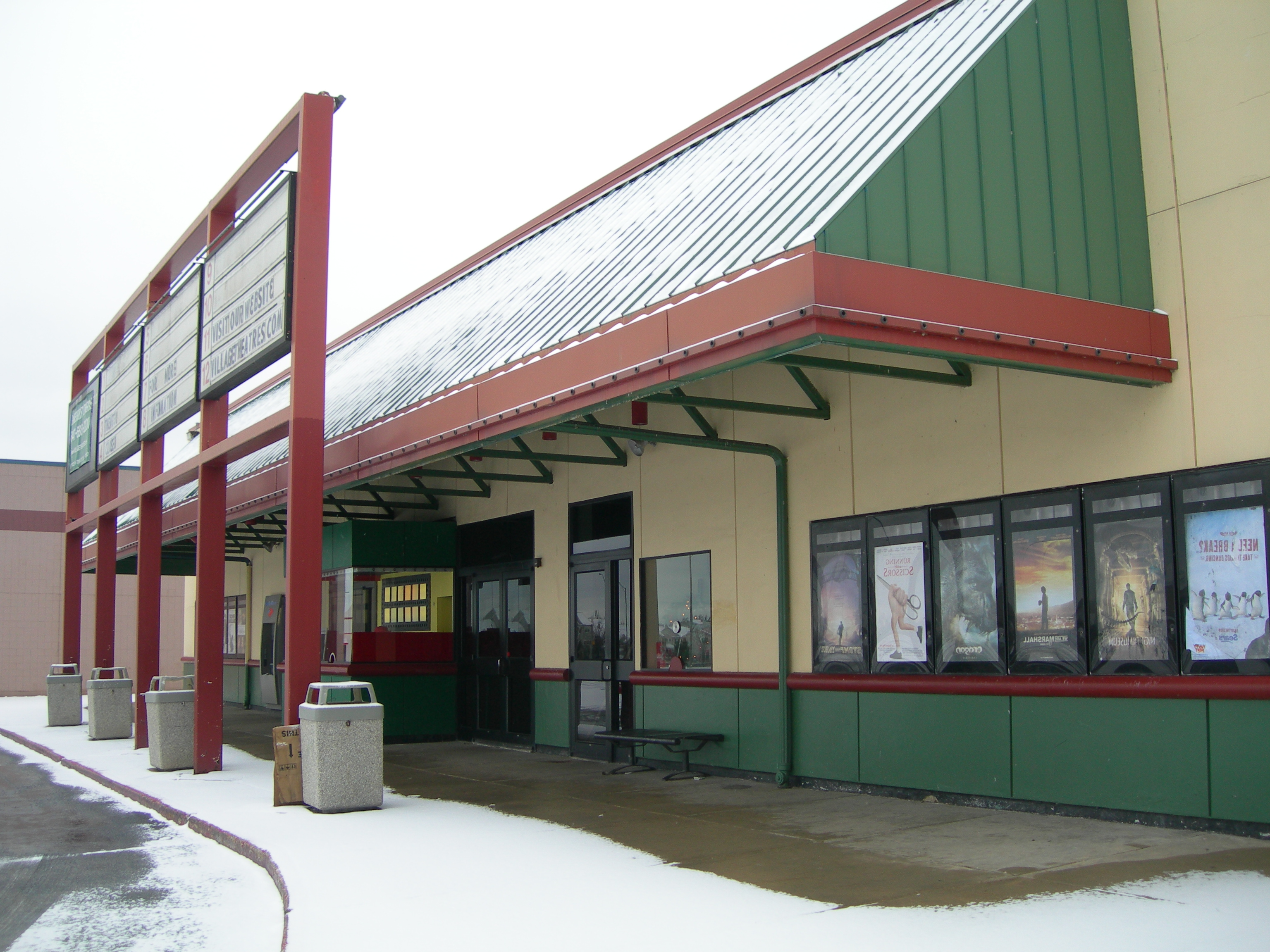
The Entrance to Lakehurst Cinema before Demolition

Lakehurst Cinemas (originally known as General Cinema Lakehurst 12 until 2000) was a multiplex movie theatre located in Waukegan, Illinois, United States, that operated from 1974 until 2007.

== History ==
General Cinema Lakehurst opened in 1974 as a part of Lakehurst Mall, a 1,100,000-square-foot (100,000 m^{2}) shopping mall across the street from the theater.

The theater was built in keeping with General Cinema's tradition of adding screens near major shopping destinations. General Cinema Lakehurst was originally built with three screens, and its opening film was The Exorcist. In 1984 the theater expanded to eight screens, and finally in 1987 to 12-screens and 3,200 seats; boasting the record for "Most Movie Screens in America", although theaters with more screens did already exist at that time.

=== Movie Pullings ===
The theatre received heavy local press in March 1991 after a large gang-related brawl occurred in the theater's parking lot at the opening of New Jack City. The melee resulted in the pulling of all showtimes for the film at the theater. Later that year the theatre was one of four to pull the film Boyz n the Hood, after a Chicagoan was murdered at the movie's opening day at a nearby theatre.

In 1995 the theatre also refused to show the movie Showgirls.

=== Decline ===
Beginning in 1991 with the opening of the colossal Gurnee Mills 10 minutes northwest; Lakehurst Mall began a decade-long decline. The dying mall was drastically affecting the surrounding businesses; many restaurants, shops, and attractions closed.

In 2000, General Cinema Lakehurst closed as a result of General Cinema's bankruptcy. Lakehurst was one of many former General Cinema theaters not acquired by AMC Theatres. The next year, Lakehurst Mall (with the exception of the surviving Carson Pirie Scott department store) was shuttered.

On September 28, 2001, the multiplex re-opened under the name Lakehurst Cinemas, and was then operated by Village Theatres, a small chain of theaters in the Chicago area. Curiously, except for a small banner covering a sign at the theater entrance, the theater still bore General Cinema signage on the building's north side, and on its sign near Waukegan Road (Route 43).

In 2003 the Lakehurst Mall property was purchased by the Shaw Company, and was demolished in 2004 for a mixed-use redevelopment known as Fountain Square of Waukegan. It was also announced that Lakehurst Cinema would close in the future, but a date was not given.

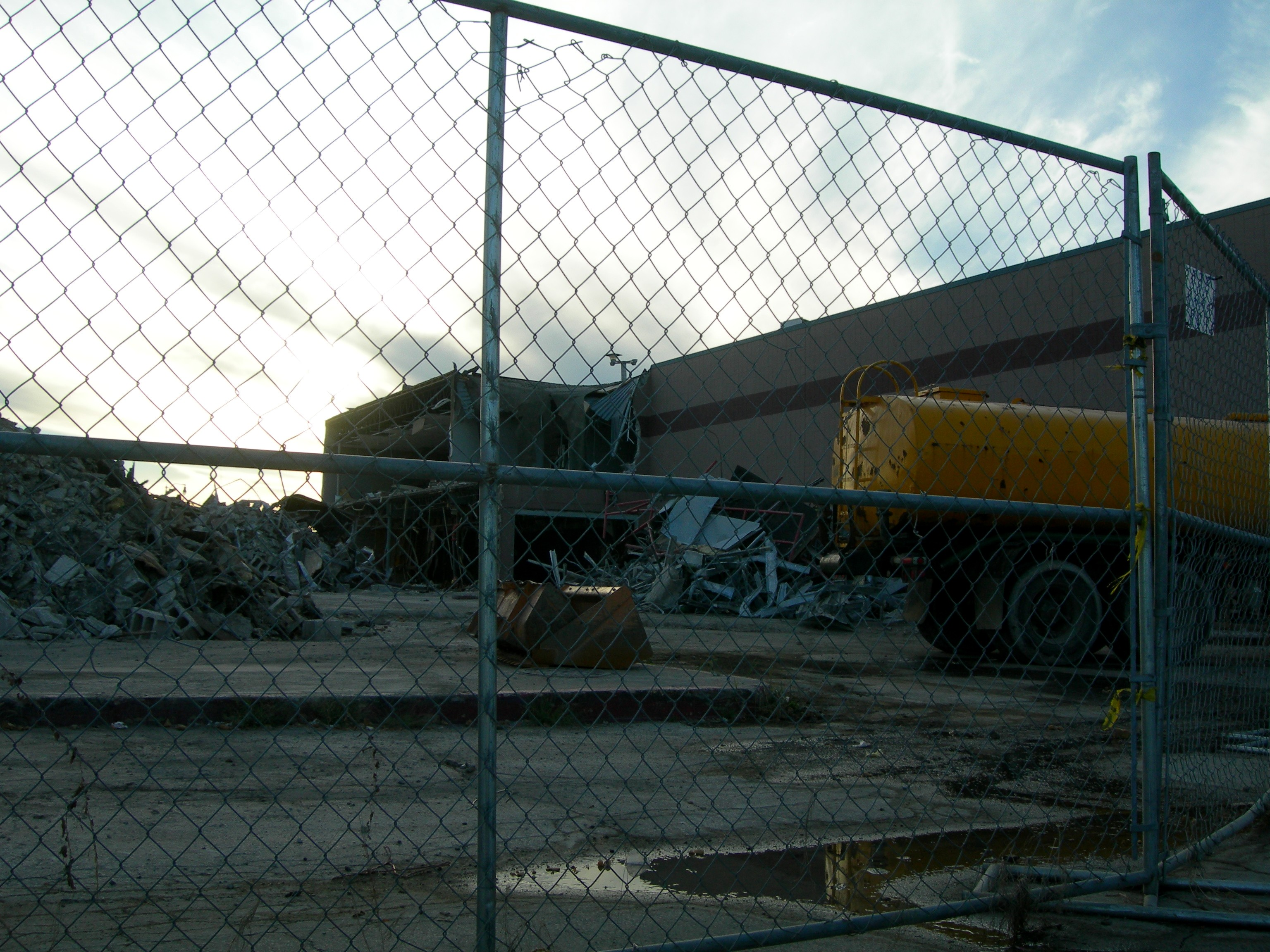
Demolition in August 2007

A visit by Lake County Building Inspectors in December 2006 resulted in a red-tag on the structure; and revealed numerous life-safety concerns including lack of heat in several theaters, a leaking roof, water in a screening room, and inoperable fire alarms. The theater briefly re-opened after repairing the most severe problems, and announced it would cease operation permanently after January 7, 2007.

Among the last films to be shown at the theater were Happy Feet, Rocky Balboa, Night at the Museum, Stomp the Yard, Eragon and We Are Marshall.

Demolition of the multiplex began in mid-July 2007, and the theater was gone by mid-August. While the press touted a Holiday Inn Express would be built on the former site of the theatre, it was actually built approximately 100 feet (30 m) west of the site. The site today is a vacant dirt-filled lot, and an Aldi store was finally built in the theater's parking lot in 2018.
