= Aleardo Terzi =

Italian illustrator and artist

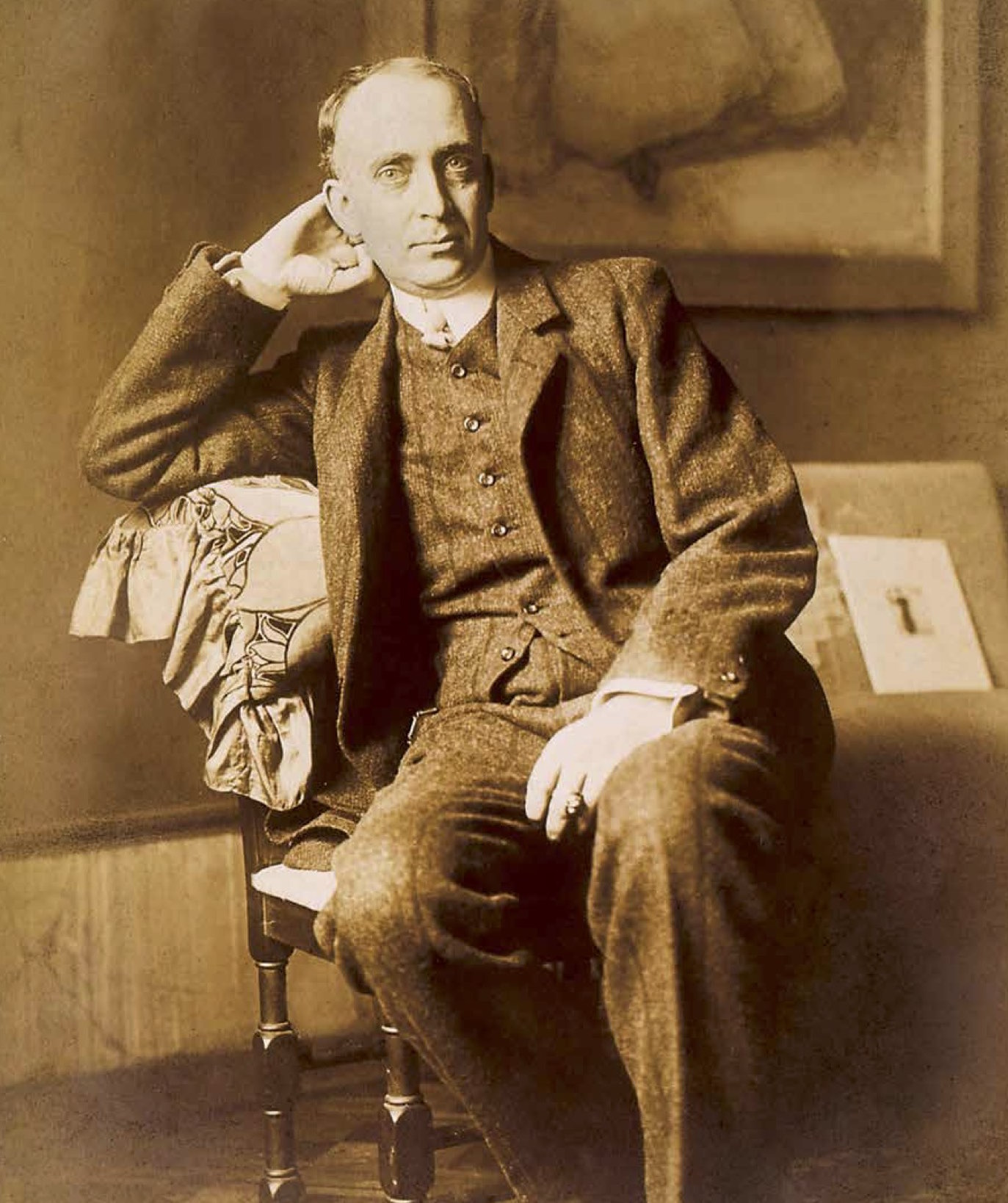
- Aleardo Terzi
- Born: 6 January 1870; Palermo, Kingdom of Italy
- Died: 15 July 1943 (aged 73); Castelletto sopra Ticino, Kingdom of Italy
- Known for: Poster art, graphic design
- Movement: Art Nouveau

Signature
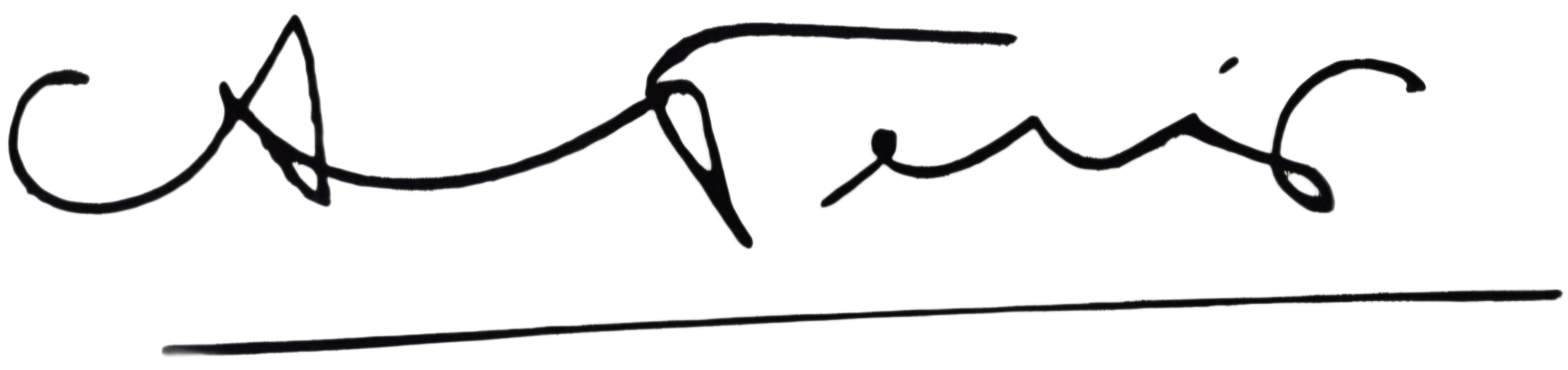

Aleardo Terzi (6 January 1870 – 15 July 1943) was an Italian illustrator and artist. As an illustrator, Terzi was described as bringing Italian Art Nouveau poster design to a world-class level. He produced work throughout his life, notably for the Italian poster company Casa Ricordi. Most of his work was destroyed in the 1960s when the company cleared its warehouses.

== Life ==
Terzi was born in Palermo on 6 January 1870. He was the son of the painter Andrea Terzi (1842–1918) and Rose Engel, who came from a family of Swiss publishers. Aleardo had a younger brother, Amedeo John Engel Terzi, who became a entomologist and specialized in scientific illustration.

Aleardo trained at the Accademia di Belle Arti di Palermo and then worked for the magazine La Tribuna Illustrata, where he met the graphic designer Giovanni Mataloni. In 1898, Mataloni introduced him to Casa Ricordi, an important publishing house based in Milan. Working alongside Adolfo Hohenstein, Marcello Dudovich, Leopoldo Metlicovitz and Leonetto Cappiello, Terzi became a skilled illustrator and began producing advertising posters. He also contributed to supplements for the Corriere della Sera.

In 1903, Terzi briefly lived in London with his brother Amedeo. The following year, in 1904, he was appointed artistic director of Danesi, a publishing house basd in Rome, and of the annual magazine Novissima, both of which were influenced by Art Nouveau. The following year, in 1905, he married Adele Bonfiglio, by whom he had three sons. In 1906, he started illustrating children's books. He began collaborating with the writer, illustrator and journalist Luigi Bertelli, working for the Florence-based publisher R. Bemporad & Figlio. He illustrated Italian versions of Little Lord Fauntleroy and Gulliver's Travels. He also contributed illustrations to the Corriere dei Piccoli.

After 1910, he started providing decorative designs for the Richard-Ginori porcelain manufactory and designing theatre costumes. In 1913, he exhibited paintings at the Secessione Romana exhibition and compiled its official catalogue. However, he continued to produce advertising posters: a famous poster for the Dentol toothpaste brand dates from this period. His graphic designs for the advertising industry were presented at the Leipzig Trade Fair in 1914.

In 1921, he designed the logo of the Milan-based varnish company Max Meyer. That same year, he joined the Gruppo Romano Incisori Artisti (GRIA), a Rome-based association of printmakers founded by Federico Hermanin, with whom Terzi exhibited. From 1923 to 1930, he directed the Scuola del Libro in Urbino. During this period, he was appointed art director of the Istituto dell'Enciclopedia Italiana.

In the early 1930s, he returned to Milan, where he devoted himself to advertising graphic design for various companies. He also began producing drypoint etchings in a highly personal style intended for an encyclopaedia of fairy tales (Enciclopedia della Fiaba). In his later years Terzi retired to Castelletto sopra Ticino, where he dedicated himself to painting. He died in Castelletto sopra Ticino in 1943.

== Selected lithographs ==
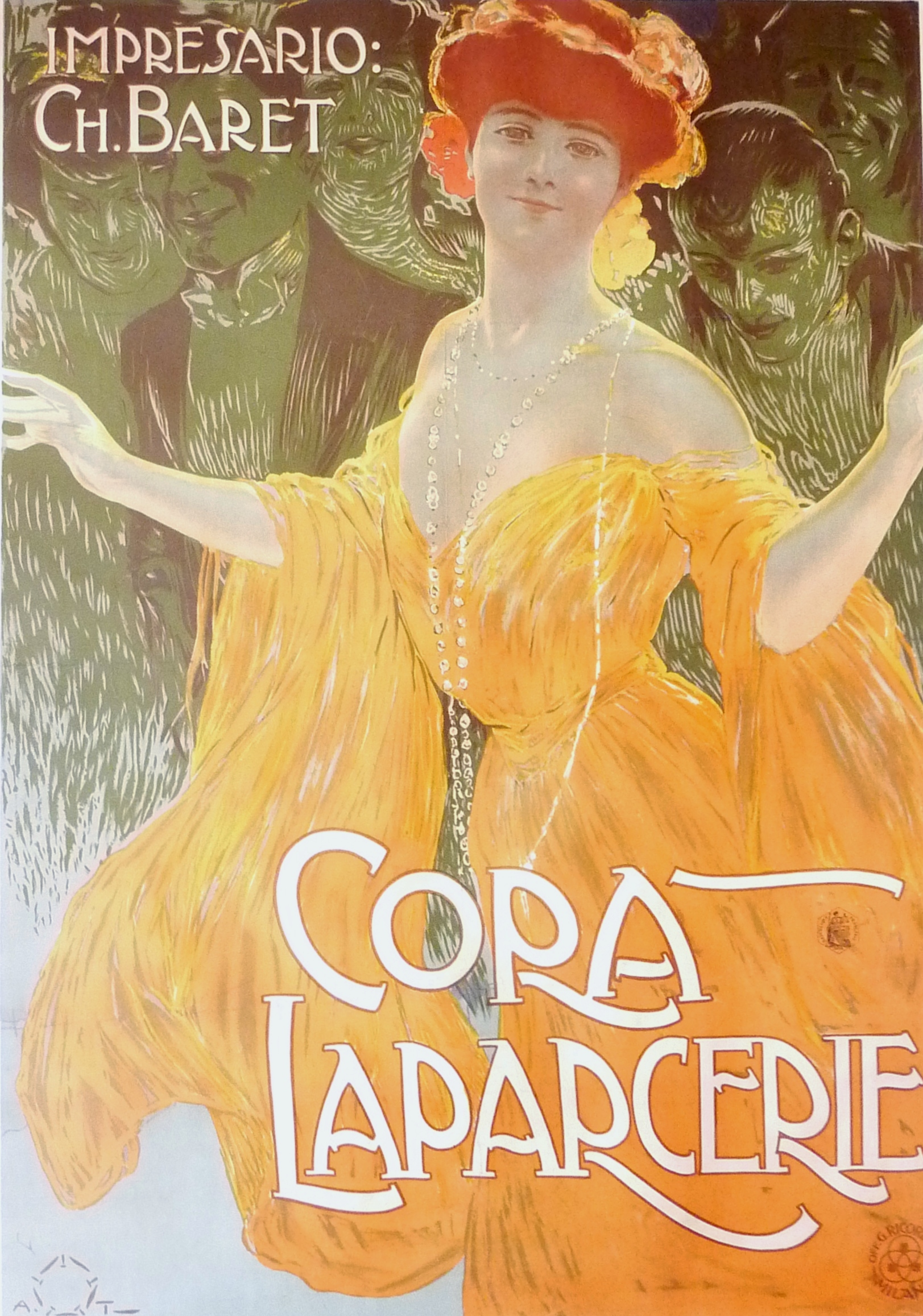
Poster for Cora Laparcerie, 1900.

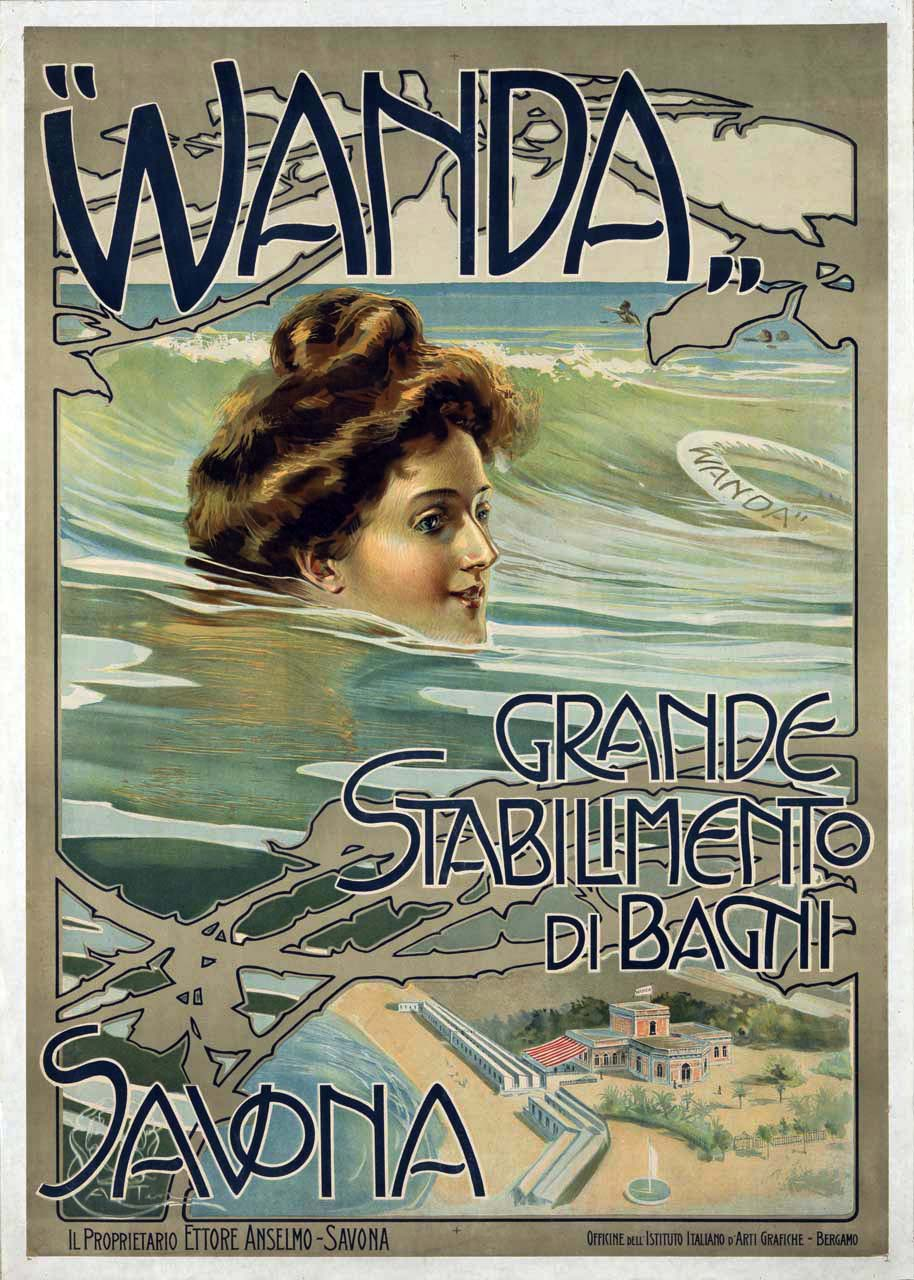
Advertising poster for Stabilimenti Wanda, 1900s.

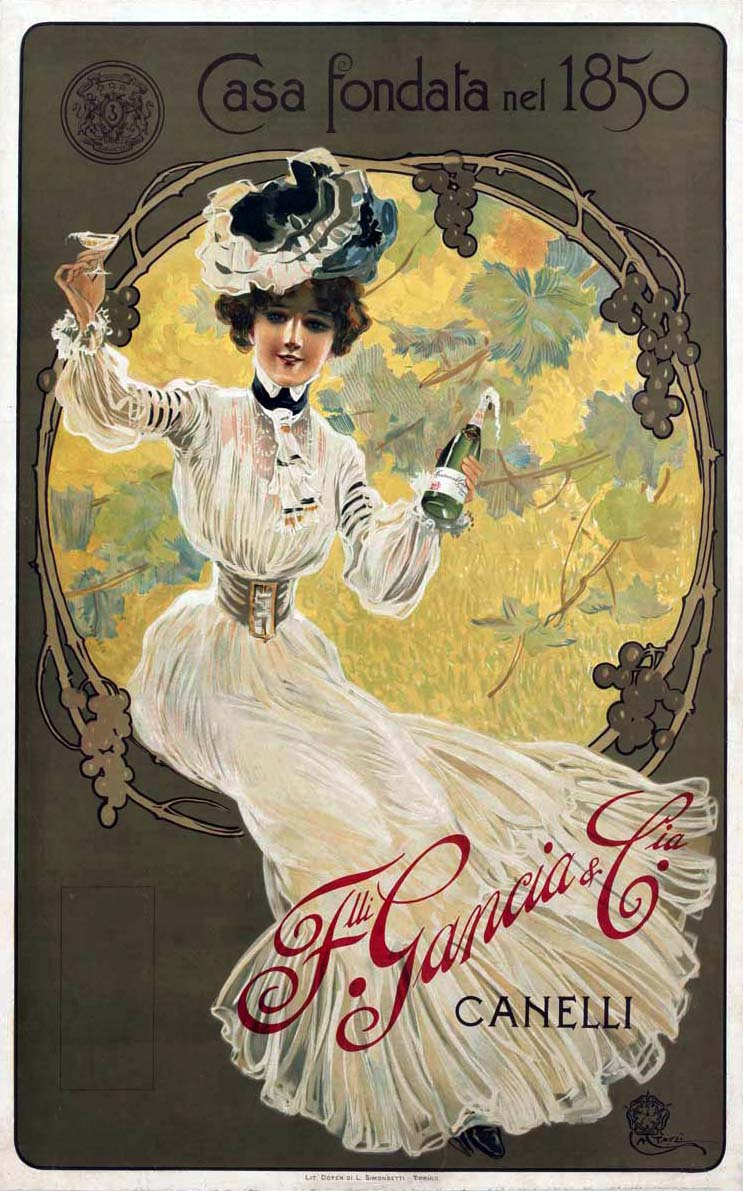
Advertising poster for the Italian wine-making company Gancia, 1900s.

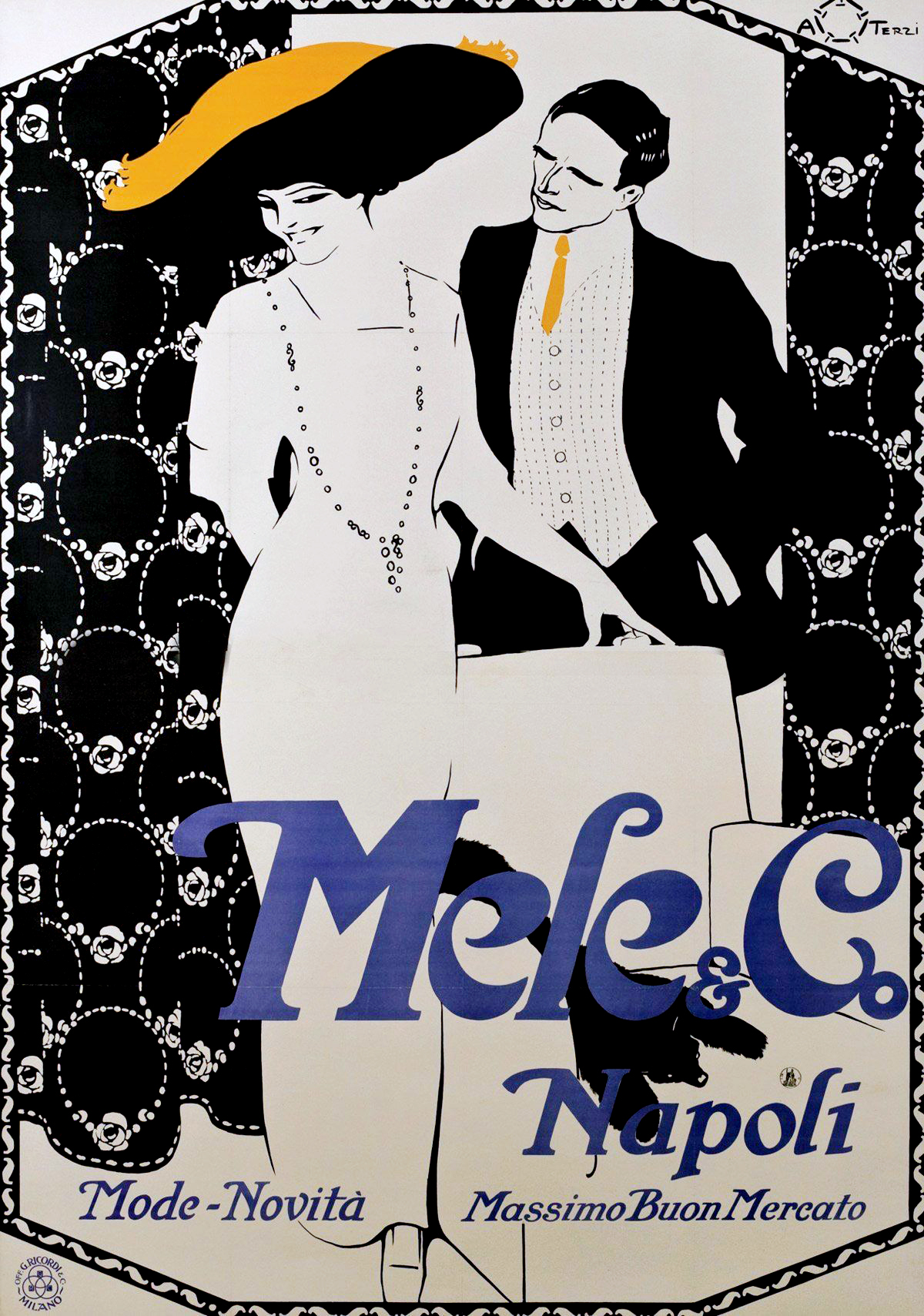
Advertising poster for Grandi Magazzini Mele, 1900s.

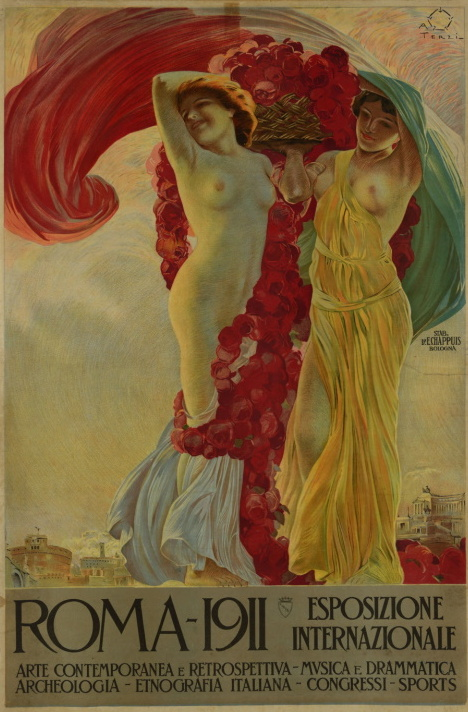
Poster for the International Exhibition of Art of Rome, 1911.

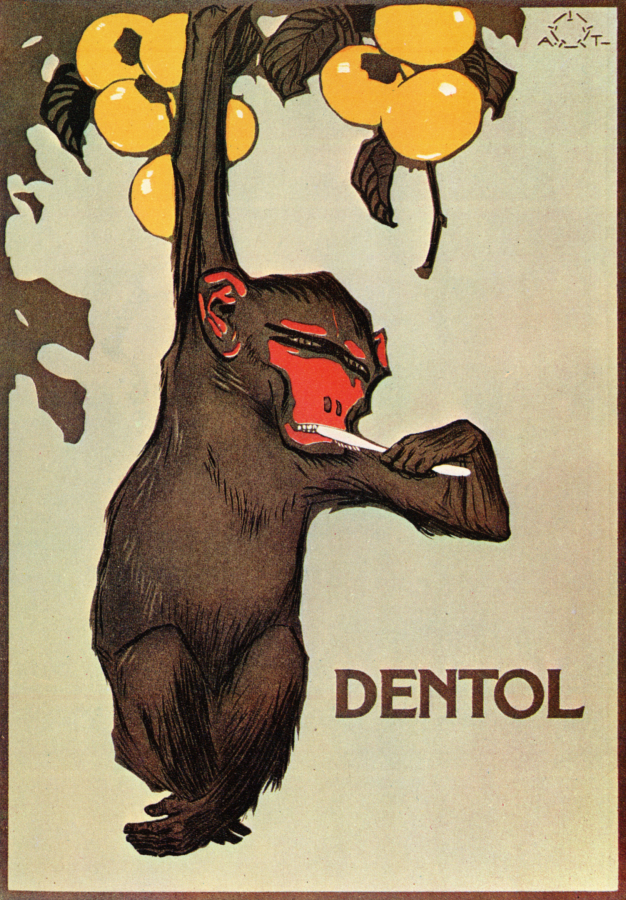
Advertising poster for the toothpaste brand Dentol, 1914.

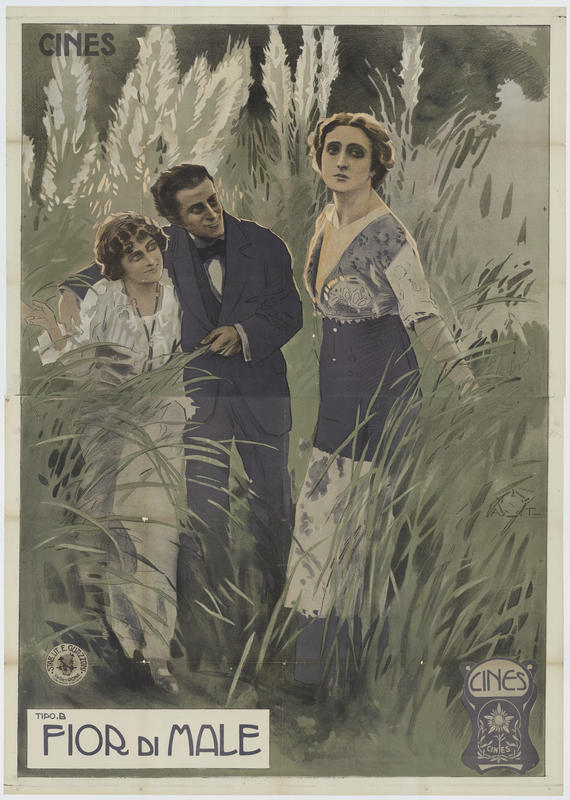
Poster for Carmine Gallone's 1915 silent drama Flower of Evil

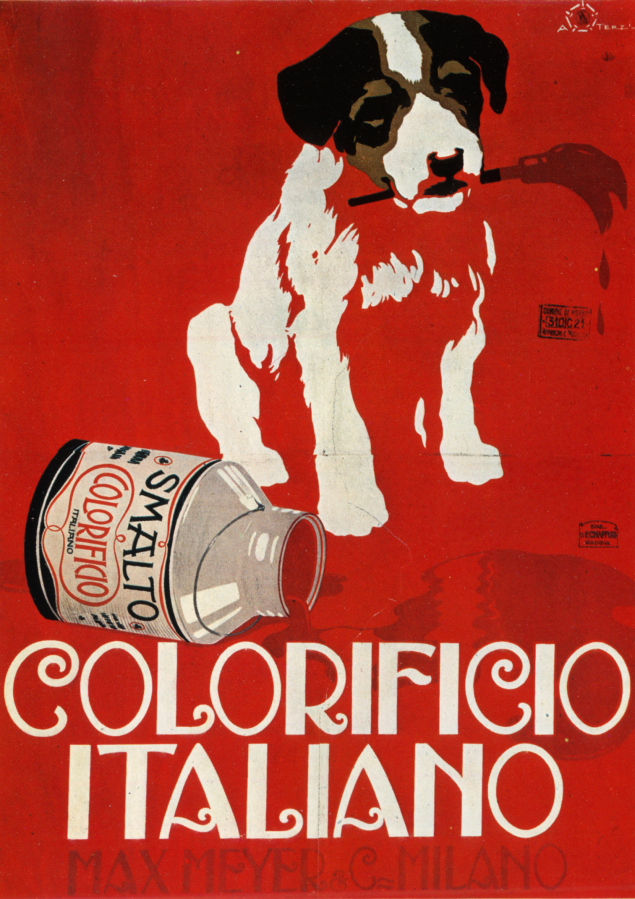
Advertising poster for the varnish company Max Meyer, 1921.
