= Flower of Evil (film) =

1915 film directed by Carmine Gallone

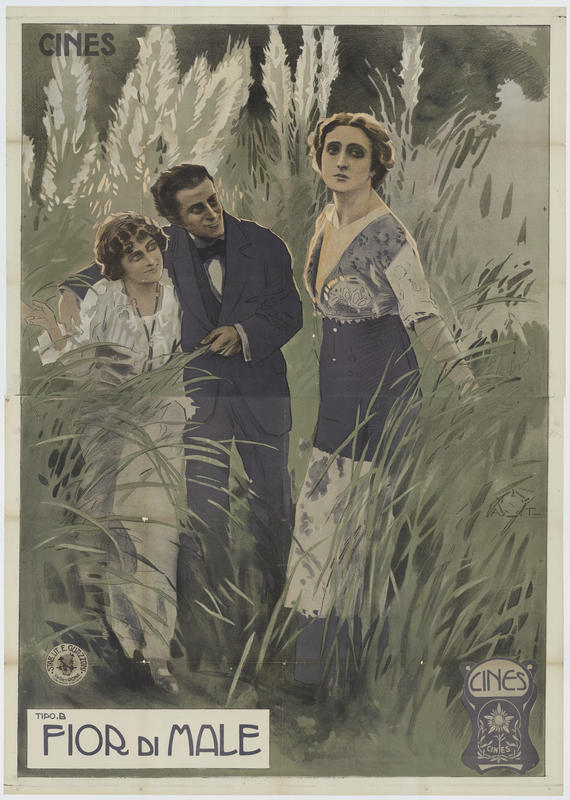
- Poster by Aleardo Terzi
- Directed by: Carmine Gallone
- Written by: Nino Oxilia
- Starring: Lyda Borelli
- Cinematography: Domenico Grimaldi
- Release date: March 1915
- Running time: 62 minutes
- Country: Italy
- Language: Silent

Flower of Evil (Italian: Fior di male) is a 1915 silent Italian drama film directed by Carmine Gallone. The film was shown as part of the Silent Divas of the Italian Cinema programme at the 38th New York Film Festival in 2000.

== Cast ==
- Ruggero Barni as Ruggero Davusky
- Lyda Borelli as Lyda
- Pina Menichelli
- Fulvia Perini as Fulvia Rogers
- Augusto Poggioli as Bambi Rogers
- Cecyl Tryan as Cecyl
