= Amedeo John Engel Terzi =

Italian illustrator and entomologist

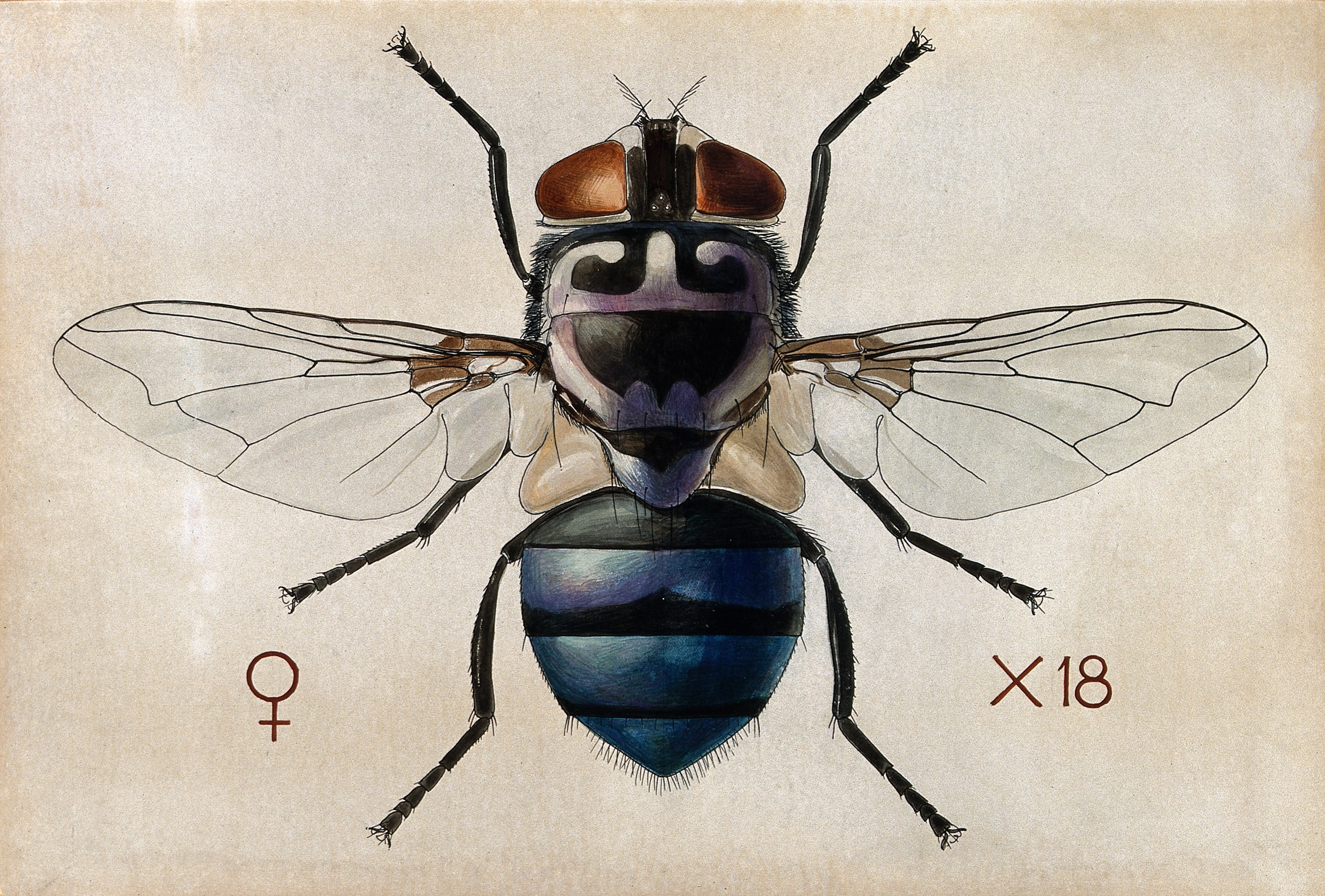
Drawing of a female blowfly, Chrysomya chloropyga, A.J.E. Terzi. Wellcome Library.

Amedeo John Engel Terzi (1872, Palermo – 1956) was an Italian illustrator and entomologist specialising in Diptera, the true flies.

He was the son of Andrea Terzi (1852-1918), a lithographer and illustrator. His brother, Aleardo Terzi (1870–1943), was also an artist; he worked on poster advertising.

Amedeo Terzi was engaged by Sir Patrick Manson (1844–1922) as an illustrator for the London School of Tropical Medicine. He executed many zoological illustrations, mostly of parasitic insects, principally Diptera, estimating that he had accomplished 37,000 drawings in the course of his career, in 55 books and more than 500 other publications.

In 1900, Terzi worked with Louis Sambon and George Carmichael Low on mosquitoes transmitting malaria at Ostia.

In 1902 he joined the Natural History Museum.
