= Terzis =

Terzis (Greek: Τερζής) is a Greek surname (from Turkish: terzi, "tailor"). The feminine form is Terzi. It may refer to:

- Paschalis Terzis (born 1949), Greek singer
- Paul Terzis, Australian rugby coach

== See also ==
- Terzi
