= Playhouse Cinema =

The Playhouse Cinema

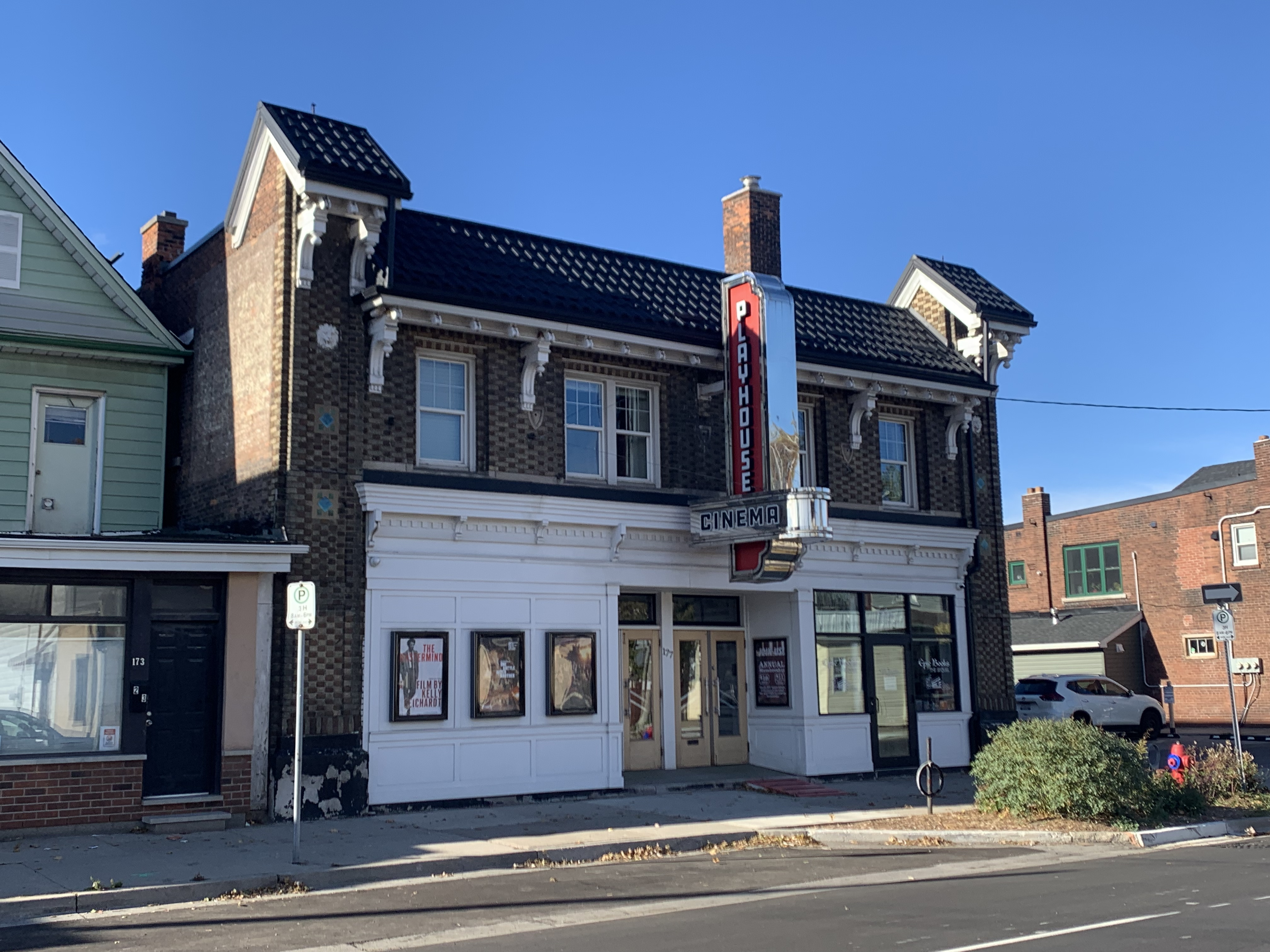
- The Playhouse Cinema, November 2025
- Interactive map of the The Playhouse Cinema area

General information
- Architectural style: Beaux arts
- Location: 177 Sherman Ave N, Hamilton, ON, Canada
- Coordinates: 43.257184°N 79.835955°W
- Renovated: 2018
- Owner: Playhouse Cinema Inc.

Design and construction
- Architects: Steward & Witton

Other information
- Seating capacity: 700 initially, 650 after 1951 renovation, 300 after 2018 renovation
- Public transit access: Hamilton Street Railway: Barton at Sherman - #1228 & #1346; Bus: 02

Website
- https://playhousecinema.ca/

The Playhouse Cinema is an independently owned and operated, single-screen cinema located in Hamilton, Ontario, Canada. It was built halfway down Sherman Ave N on its West side in Hamilton's historic North Stipley neighbourhood. The cinema has changed ownership several times since its construction in 1914. Originally the 700-seat Playhouse Theatre showed vaudeville and films. The building subsequently served as the neighbourhood's Italian cinema, an adult film theatre, briefly as a local live theatre production house, the headquarters of children's ministry CityKidz and now the revived Playhouse Cinema.

== History ==
=== Original Playhouse Theatre (1914-1957) ===
The construction of the Playhouse Theatre was announced in April 1914, with local businessman Montalieu Nesbitt applying for the business charter. Local architectural firm Stewart & Witton was contracted to design the theatre in the Beaux-Arts style. The theatre cost roughly $20,000 to construct (approximately $550,000 CAD in 2025 dollars). The Playhouse Theatre was the second Hamilton theatre opened by businessman Frederick Guest.

The interior of the Playhouse Theatre taken sometime in the late 1910s.

The Playhouse Theatre opened to the public in November 1914, featuring vaudeville and motion pictures. The theatre initially had over 700 seats and according to a local news report "special attention has been paid to ventilation and exits, all passed by civic building's inspector department."

The Playhouse Theatre screened several prominent silent films throughout the 1920s, including Rupert Julian's classic The Phantom of the Opera (1925), which screened at the Playhouse on January 12, 1926.

According to a 1935 legal proceeding involving then owner Anthony Patzlek, the theatre's best year to that point was 1931 in which it grossed $39,000 ($793,000 CAD in 2025). But in the following years business declined drastically, to just $26,000 ($595,000 CAD in 2025) as The Great Depression took away many Canadians ability to visit the cinemas and movie licensing fees climbed. Patzlek claimed the business was losing money.

In July 1946 the auditorium was used by Local 1005 to vote in favour of the STELCO steelworkers strike that would last until October 4, 1946. In 1951, owner Anthony Patzalek renovated the theatre, completely remodelling the interior in the Art-Deco style of the time and reducing the seating to 650. The commercial theatre closed in 1957.

=== First sale and operation as Italian cinema, then adult movie theatre (1957-1990) ===
After remaining dormant for several years, the theatre was sold to a local Italian family who converted it to Hamilton's premiere Italian theatre in the early 1960s. The theatre screened Italian films as well as Hollywood films dubbed in Italian, such as Doctor Zhivago (1965) and The Godfather Part II (1974).

The Playhouse Theatre sometime in the 1960s, the marquee reads Il Padrino Part II.

The theatre struggled throughout the 1970s and was sold to Michael and Santina Parente in 1977, another family of Italian immigrants, for $125,000 ($602,000 CAD in 2025). The theatre continued to struggle screening just Italian films, so the Parentes began showing blue films to improve revenue in 1979. The Playhouse was the only adult film theatre in city. In August 1990 the theatre closed as a commercial cinema.

=== Dormancy and brief operation as live theatre (1990-1998) ===
Theatre Terra Nova, founded in 1988 by Brian Morton, bought the building in 1990 with a $225,000 loan (approximately $423,000 CAD in 2025) from Hamilton City Council. The troupe performed various Canadian plays and musical in the theatre, including Billy Bishop Goes to War (1978), Cold Comfort (1982) and troupe member Dave Carley's Writing with Our Feet (1990). The troupe folded in 1992, after which the building sat dormant for over 5 years.

=== Sale to CityKidz and operation as children's ministry (1998-2018) ===
On June 28, 1998 the building was sold to CityKidz, a non-denominational Christian ministry hosting events for inner-city youth. CityKidz spent a reported $60,000 on the building ($108,500 CAD in 2025), raising $25,000 in donations from the community in just 48 hours. Reverend Todd Bender said when they went to take down the "Sold" sign that "all the neighbours were out on the sidewalk to welcome us to the community." CityKidz had previously only been able to host 600 children per week in a rented room at Tweedsmuir School, but the Playhouse allowed them to start hosting 1,800 children per week. The organization would spend the next 20 years operating their Saturday kids program in the theatre. CityKidz listed the building for sale in 2017 after moving their headquarters to a new location on Burlington St.

=== Sale to Princess Cinemas and revival as The Playhouse Theatre (2018-present) ===
On February 12, 2018 the building was sold to the Tutt family, owners of the Princess Twin Cinemas in Waterloo, who were looking to expand their revival house cinema business to the City of Hamilton. After spending a year renovating the theatre (reducing its seating to 300) it reopened as The Playhouse Theatre on March 1, 2019, with a soldout screening of Cinema Paradiso (1988) and Cold War (2018) attended by then mayor of Hamilton Fred Eisenberger. The Tutts spent a reported $450,000 on renovations ($555,000 CAD in 2025). On March 21, 2019, a refurbished neon Playhouse Theatre sign was installed on the building's facade by Scott Jackson. The refurbished sign was bought from a collector and originally hung on the front of Brantford, Ontario's iconic Sanderson Centre.

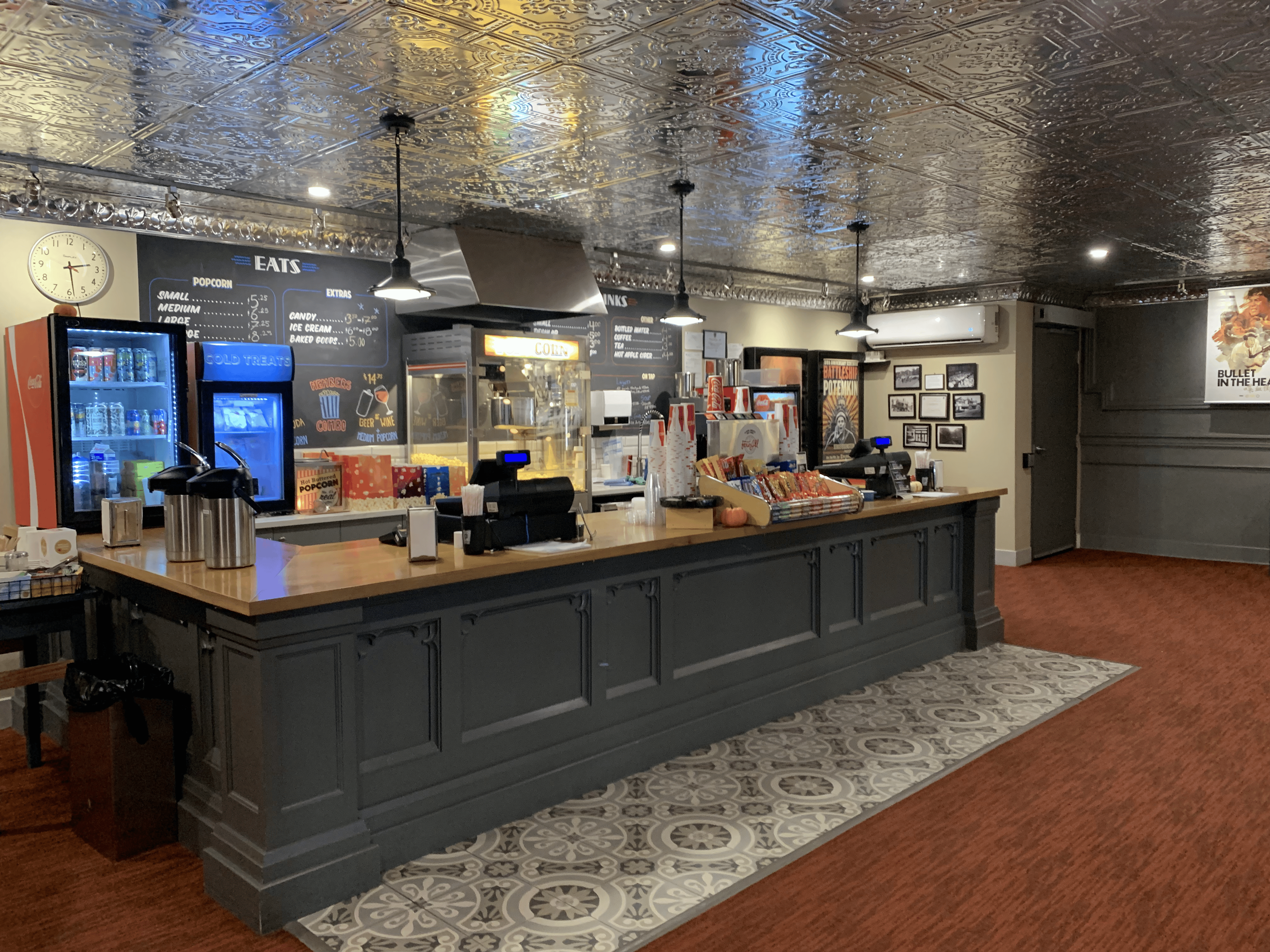
The Playhouse Cinema's renovated concession stand, standing where several rows of seats stood pre-renovation.

The revived theatre aimed to screen films not shown at Canada's dominant cinema chains like Cineplex, Imagine or Landmark. Playhouse began screening a mix of recent Oscar-nominees such as A Fantastic Woman (2017) and Phantom Thread (2017), arthouse hits like Eraserhead (1977) and restorations of films like Emeric Pressburger and Michael Powell's classic A Matter of Life and Death (1946).

In its first year of business, the new Playhouse sold 5,000 memberships and attracted 50,000 patrons, which sustained the business through the shutdowns in 2020 due to the COVID-19 pandemic. The theatre shut down March 17, 2020 due to the provincial lockdown and re-opened with social distancing and mask mandates for its patrons in July 2020. The Playhouse faced further closures due to lockdowns from November 2020 to July 2021 and a 3-week lockdown in January 2022, but re-opened permanately in February 2022.

In August 2021, the theatre started using a refurbished 35mm projector that theatre manager and projectionist Jacob Tutt had been working on since 2020. Parts were sourced from scrapyards and collectors, including cast iron pedestals that were used in Expo 67 and lamp houses from Longview, Texas. The Playhouse became the 4th cinema in Ontario at the time with a 35mm projector and first used the projector to screen a 35mm print of Quentin Tarantino's Once Upon a Time in Hollywood (2019).

== See also ==
- Cinema of Canada
- Hamilton, Ontario
- Revival house
