= Margherita Terzi =

Italian artist

Margherita Terzi was a Venetian pastellist of the eighteenth century.

Terzi was related to the Bolognese painter Cristoforo Terzi. She is recorded as having been a pupil of Rosalba Carriera, who in 1752 gave the sum of 200 ducats "alle due sorelle Margherita e Maria Terzi". Her work was known as well to the Scottish pastellist Catherine Read, who in correspondence with Carriera dating to 1756 sent compliments to Terzi and offered to provide her with more paper.
