= Filmtheater de Uitkijk =

Historic Dutch cinema

Coordinates: 52°21′53″N 4°53′04″E

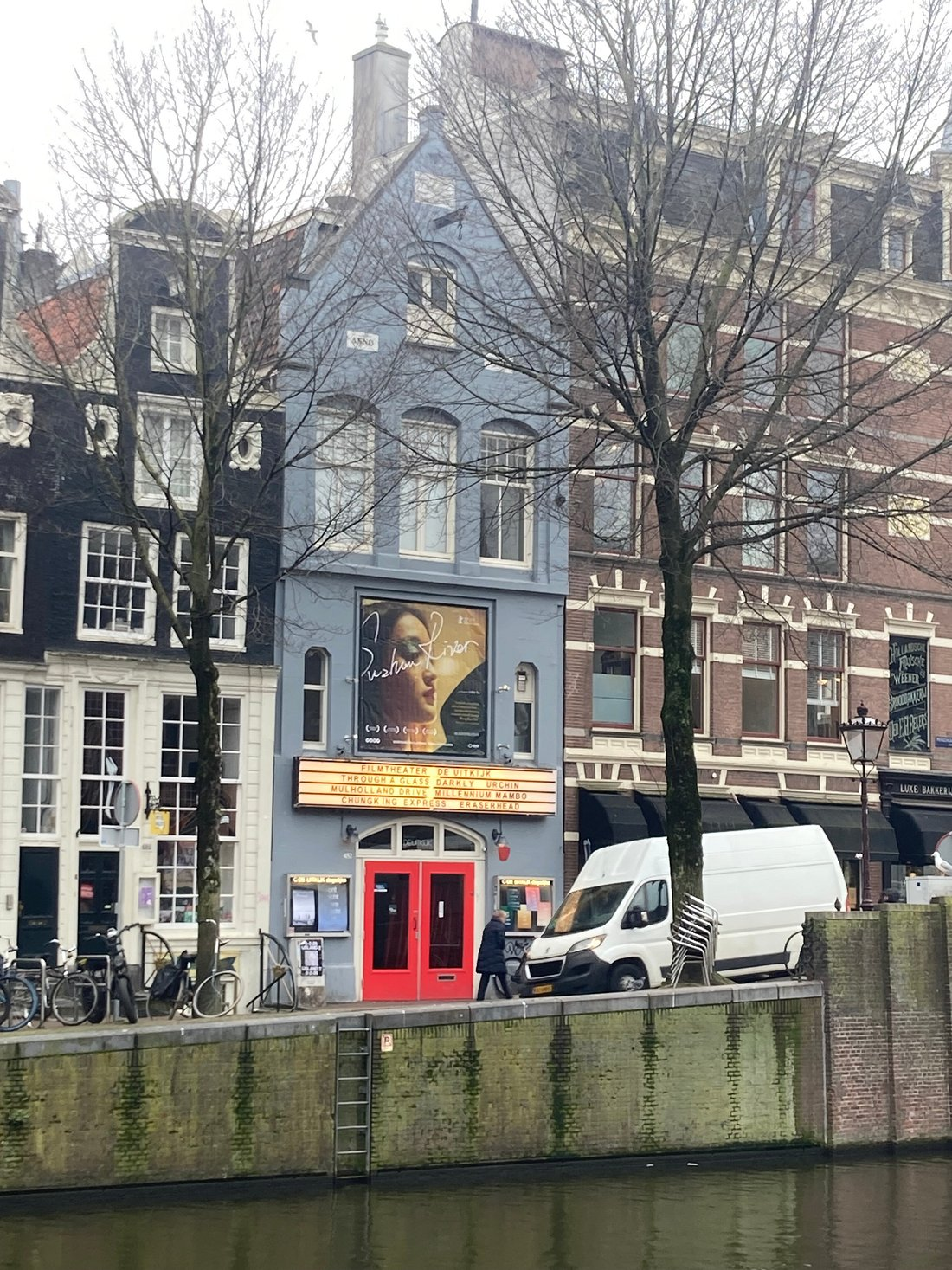
- Established: 1912
- Staff: 12
- Location: Prinsengracht 452, Amsterdam, the Netherlands
- Interactive map of Filmtheater de Uitkijk
- Website: https://uitkijk.nl/

Filmtheater de Uitkijk is an independent one-screen movie theater located at the Prinsengracht in the Canal District of Amsterdam. It is one of the oldest cinemas in Amsterdam and in the Netherlands.

== History ==
The building, which dates back to 1689, was first converted into a movie theater in 1912. It was then called the City Bioscope. In 1929, the Nederlandsche Filmliga took over the theater and founded the first avant-garde cinema in the Netherlands: De Uitkijk.

Since 2007, De Uitkijk has been run entirely by students. It focuses mainly on repertory cinema screenings.
