= Cristoforo Terzi =

Italian painter (1692–1743)

Cristoforo Terzi

Cristoforo Terzi (1692–1743) was an Italian painter of the late-Baroque period. He was born and died in Bologna. He was a pupil of Giuseppe Maria Crespi. He painted a San Petronio kneeling before the Virgin for the church of San Giacomo Maggiore.

The Venetian pastellist Margherita Terzi was a relative.
