= Row House Cinema =

Film theater in Pittsburgh, PA

Coordinates: 40.46991°N 79.96099°W

Row House Cinema is a small, independent cinema in Pittsburgh, Pennsylvania. The theater opened in a historic row house building on Butler Street in Pittsburgh's Lawrenceville neighborhood in 2014. The theater is known for its festivals, events, and its connected taproom and bottle shop Bierport. It is owned by Brian Mendelssohn.

The theater hosts themed weeks throughout the year as well as The Pittsburgh Japanese Film Festival, The Sweded Film Festival, and The Pittsburgh International Children's Film Festival.

In Cate Blanchett's 2023 Vanity Fair cover story, she mentioned Row House Cinema as one of her favorite repertory cinemas.

In 2023, Row House announced that it had purchased the historic Hollywood Theater in Dormont with plans for a full renovation.

== COVID-19 ==
In response to the COVID-19 pandemic, Row House Cinema temporarily closed. The theater then created the Quarantine Cat Film Festival, a compilation film of cat videos. It then released its annual Sweded Film Festival, which is a compilation of famous films remade in under 5 minutes by amateurs — inspired by the film Be Kind Rewind. Both films were released under Row House Films, when grew to a small film distributor. It acquired the rights to distribute the film Monuments in 2021.

In October 2020, Row House Cinema also hosted a pop-up drive-in theater in Pittsburgh's Strip District neighborhood.
