= Julia Noordegraaf =

Dutch scholar of digital media

Noordegraaf in 2012

Julia J. Noordegraaf is a Dutch scholar of digital media, digital archiving, and the curation, exhibition, and scholarly uses of audiovisual materials and other digital forms of cultural content. She is professor of digital heritage at the University of Amsterdam, in its Department of Media Studies, and director of the university's Centre for Cultural Heritage and Identity and its Creative Amsterdam research program.

== Education and career ==
Noordegraaf was born in Hengelo, in the Twente region, in 1972. She completed a Ph.D. in 2004, at Erasmus University Rotterdam; her doctoral dissertation concerned "the history of museum presentation in visual culture of the 19th and 20th centuries".

She has been a member of the academic staff of the University of Amsterdam since 2003, when she became the director of a master's program entitled "Preservation and Presentation of the Moving Image".

== Recognition ==
Noordegraaf was elected to the Royal Netherlands Academy of Arts and Sciences in 2023, and to the Koninklijke Hollandsche Maatschappij der Wetenschappen in 2026.

== Books ==
Noordegraaf is the author of a scholarly monograph, Strategies of Display: Museum Presentation in Nineteenth- and Twentieth-century Visual Culture (Museum Boijmans Van Beuningen, 2012). She is the coeditor of Preserving and Exhibiting Media Art: Challenges and Perspectives (with Cosetta G. Saba, Barbara le Maître, and Vinzenz Hediger, Amsterdam University Press, 2013).
