= Andrea Terzi =

Italian painter and engraver (1842–1918)

Andrea Terzi (November 10, 1842 in Monreale, Kingdom of the Two Sicilies – 1918 in Rome) was an Italian painter and engraver.

Born to a poor family, as a boy, he briefly studied under Giuseppe Patania. After the age of 19 years, he studied painting with abbot Domenico Benedetto Gravina, and was called to work for two years in Monreale Cathedral. He taught himself illustration, and in 1872 helped illustrate a book on the Palatine Chapel of Palermo, Il Duomo di Monreale, written by professor Michele Amari, Monsignor Isidoro Carini, and Francesco Saverio Cavallari. The book won an award at the 1873 Universal Exhibition of Vienna, and in 1878 at the Universal Exhibition of Paris, and at other artistic and industrial exhibitions in Palermo. In 1877, the Ministry of Agriculture and Commerce lobbied the King on Terzi's behalf for an appointment as Knight of the Order of the Crown of Italy, for his work at the Palatine Chapel.

He also produced chromolithography tables for the Ministry of Education with depictions of the plants of Sicily, the topography, and the archaeological sites of Syracuse. His son, Amedeo John Engel Terzi, was best known for his detailed engravings of Diptera (flies).
