= Lakehurst Mall =

Lakehurst
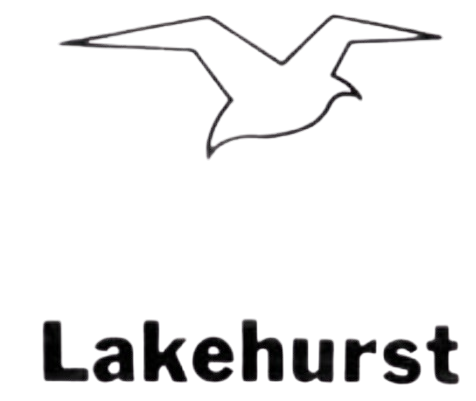

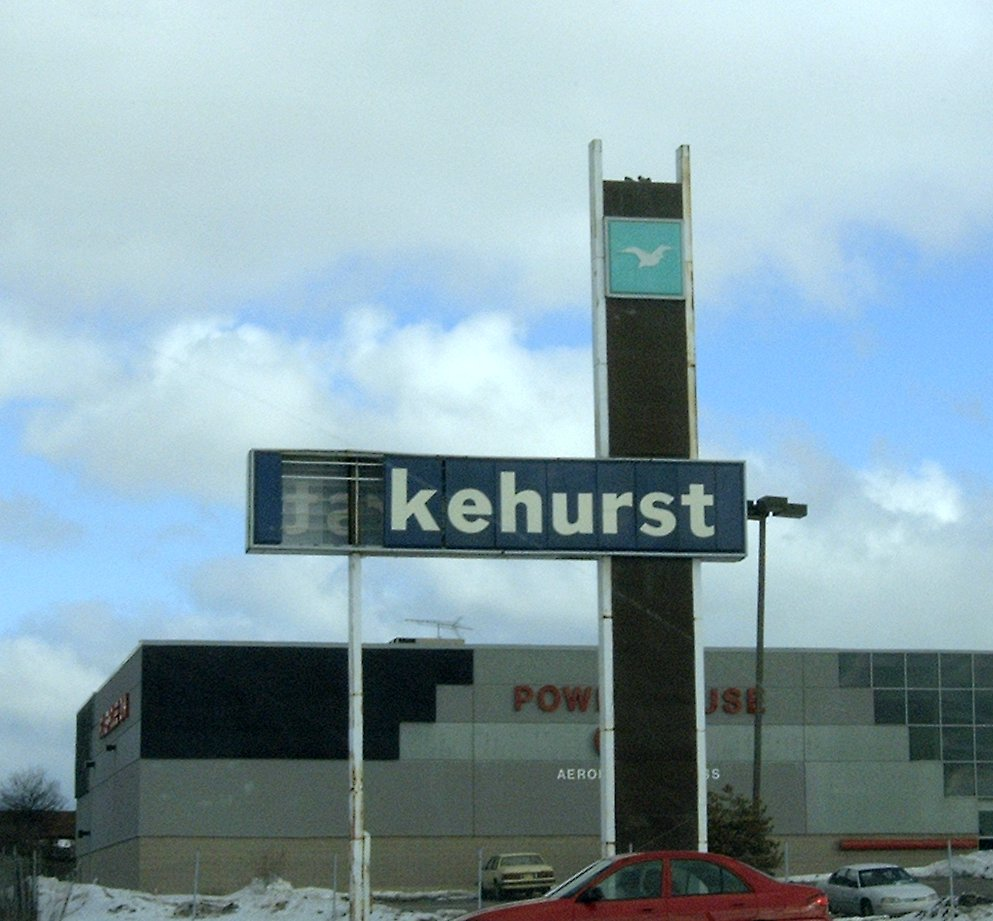
- Signage for Lakehurst Mall in 2007, after the mall's demolition.
- Location: Waukegan, Illinois, United States
- Coordinates: 42°20′34″N 87°53′56″W
- Opened: August 19, 1971; 55 years ago
- Closed: January 31, 2001; 25 years ago (demolished February 2004)
- Developer: Randhurst Corp.; and Arthur Rubloff & Co.
- Manager: Jacobs Group
- Owner: Jacobs Group
- Architect: Sidney H. Morris & Associates and Gruen Associates
- Num. of stores: about 100
- Num. of anchor tenants: 3
- Floor area: 1,100,000 sq ft (100,000 m^{2})
- Floors: 2
- Public transit: Pace

Lakehurst Mall was a shopping mall in Waukegan, Illinois, a suburb of Chicago, Illinois, United States. The mall officially opened in 1971. The mall's anchor stores were JCPenney, Wieboldt's, and Carson Pirie Scott. After Wieboldt's closed in 1986, its former location was divided between Montgomery Ward and Dunham's Sports. The mall declined in the 1990s, closed in 2001, and was demolished in 2004.

== Beginning ==
In December 1968, 200 acres (0.81 km^{2}) of farmland close to the Tri-State Tollway was purchased from Thomas E. Wilson/Edellyn Farms for $2 million, and annexed into Waukegan, Illinois. Construction on the mall began about one year later, in September 1969. A five-year research project of Lake County had concluded that Lake County would be one of the fastest developing areas of the Midwest. The mall was designed by Sidney H. Morris and Associates of Chicago and Gruen Associates of Los Angeles; Initially, Arthur Rubloff & Co. of Chicago was the management and leasing agent for Lakehurst.

The new 1.1 million square feet (102,000 m²) mall officially opened on August 19, 1971. Over 5,000 people attended the opening day ceremonies, including the mayor of Waukegan. Original anchor stores of the mall were JCPenney, Carson Pirie Scott, and Wieboldt's. 85 percent of the center had been leased by 1970. Other major tenants included Henry C. Lytton & Co., Chas. A. Stevens, and Hein's department stores, the latter of which also had a location in downtown Waukegan. Some of the mall stores included The Plum Tree, Orange Julius, Hallmark and Kinney Shoes.

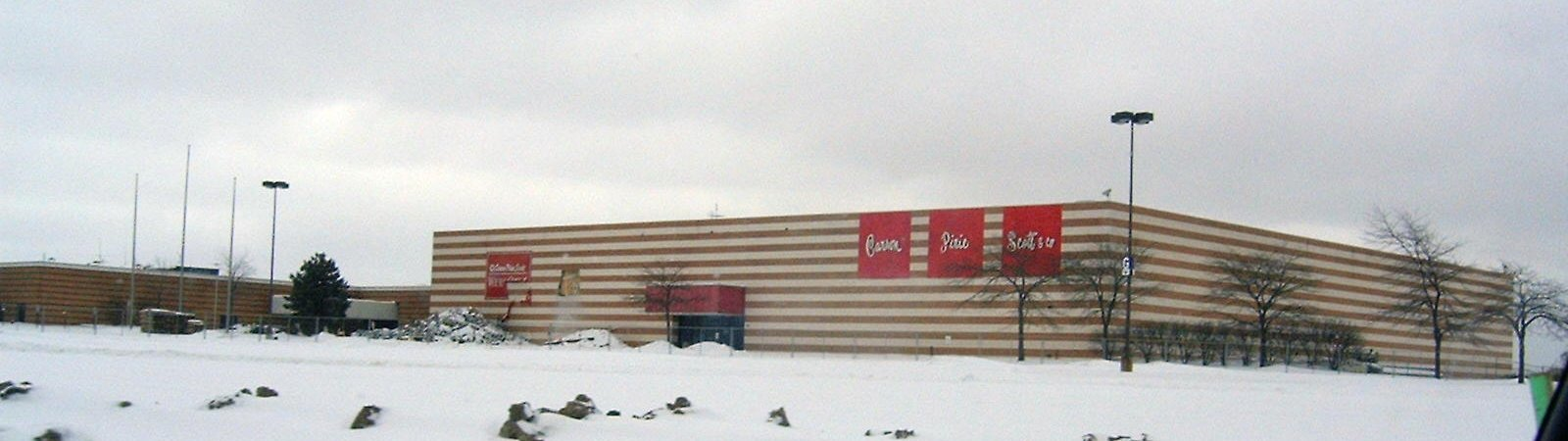
Carson Pirie Scott & co.

== 2000s ==
Fewer than five tenants remained by 2000. These included the Gift Tree and Barbary Coast stores in the mall, as well as the Carson Pirie Scott anchor. When the leases on the two mall stores ended on January 31, 2001, most of the mall was shuttered, and only Carson's was in operation.

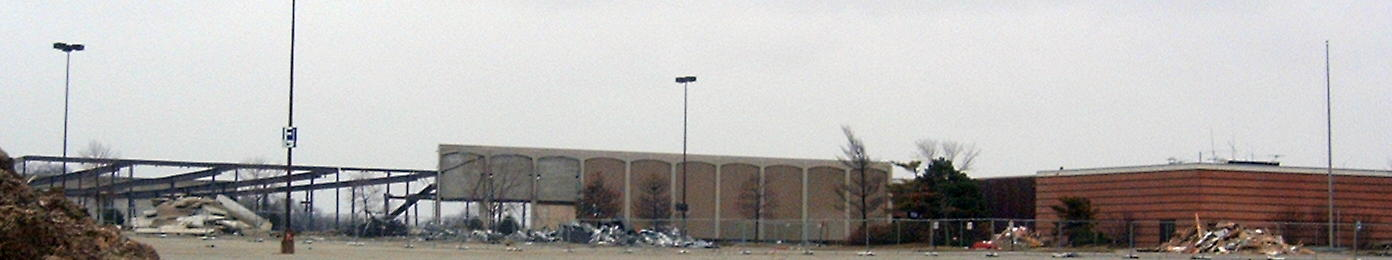
Demolition of Wieboldt's section of Lakehurst in 2004
