= Marcello =

- Gender: Male
- Language: Italian

Origin
- Region of origin: Italy

Other names
- Variant forms: Marcus, Marcellus, Marc
- Nicknames: Marco, Cello

Marcello is a common masculine Italian given name. It is a variant of Marcellus. The Spanish and Portuguese variant of the name is Marcelo, differing in having only one "l", while the Greek form is Markellos.

== Etymology ==
The name originally means like a hammer. It is originally the adjectival form of Marcus, which means hammer; the -el suffix was in times of archaic Latin the adjectival form. It also sounds like mar 'cello'.

== People with given name ==
- Marcello Abbado (1926–2020), Italian pianist
- Marcello Boldrini (1890–1969), Italian statistician
- Marcello Borges (born 1997), American soccer player
- Marcello Caetano (1906–1980), Portuguese politician
- Marcello Caifano, Chicago mobster
- Marcello Campolonghi (born 1975), Italian footballer
- Marcello Canino (1895–1970), Italian architect and civil engineer
- Marcello Castellini (born 1973), Italian footballer
- Marcello Cerruti (1808–1896), Italian diplomat and politician
- Marcello Ciorciolini (1922–2011), Italian director and screenwriter
- Marcello Coppo (born 1978), Italian politician
- Marcello Dudovich (1878–1962), Italian painter and illustrator
- Marcello Fabbri (1923–2015), Italian poet
- Marcello Falzerano (born 1991), Italian footballer
- Marcello Fois (born 1960), Italian writer
- Marcello Gandini (born 1938), Italian car designer
- Marcello Gigante (1923–2001), Italian Byzantinist, classical scholar and papyrologist
- Marcello Giordani (1963–2019), Italian opera singer
- Marcello Guidi (born 1997), Italian swimmer
- Marcello Lippi (born 1948), Italian football manager
- Marcello Magni (1959–2022), Italian actor and theatre director
- Marcello Malpighi (1628–1694), Italian biologist and physician
- Marcello Mastrilli (1603–1637), Italian Jesuit missionary
- Marcello Mastroianni (1924–1996), Italian actor
- Marcello Musto (born 1976), Canadian political scientist
- Marcello Olivares (born 2001), American fencer
- Marcello Pacifico (born 1977), Italian trade unionist
- Marcello Pera (born 1943), Italian philosopher and politician
- Marcello Planca, Italian Roman Catholic bishop
- Marcello Possenti (born 1992), Italian footballer
- Marcello D. Rapp, bass guitarist for American alternative rock band Against All Will
- Marcello Siniscalco (1924–2013), Italian scientist
- Marcello Spatafora (born 1941), Italian diplomat
- Marcello Stefanini (1938–1994), Italian politician
- Marcello Thedford, American actor
- Marcello Trotta (born 1992), Italian footballer
- Marcello Varallo (born 1947), Italian alpine skier
- Marcello Veneziale (born 1941), Italian magistrate and politician
- Marcello Venusti (1512–1579), Italian painter
- Marcello Violi (born 1993), Italian rugby union player

== People with surname ==
=== In music ===
- Alessandro Marcello, Italian nobleman and dilettante who dabbled in various areas, especially music
- Benedetto Marcello, brother of Alessandro, Italian composer, writer, advocate, magistrate, and teacher
- Rosanna Scalfi Marcello, composer, singer, and wife of Benedetto Marcello
- Kee Marcello, former guitarist in the Swedish hard rock band Europe
- Rob Marcello, the current guitarist of the band Danger Danger

=== Other fields ===
- Carlos Marcello, Italian-American mobster
- Joseph Marcello, Italian-American mobster
- Marcello, pseudonym used by Swiss sculptor and painter Adèle d'Affry

== Fictional Characters ==
- Marcello, an antagonist in the video game, Dragon Quest VIII.

== See also ==
- San Marcello (disambiguation)
- Marcello class submarine, a class of Italian submarines
