= ANIEF =

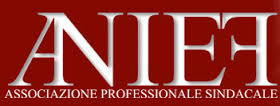

The ANIEF is a national trade union centre in Palermo, Italy.

== President ==
- Marcello Pacifico (2003- )
