= Giovanni Mataloni =

Italian illustrator and painter

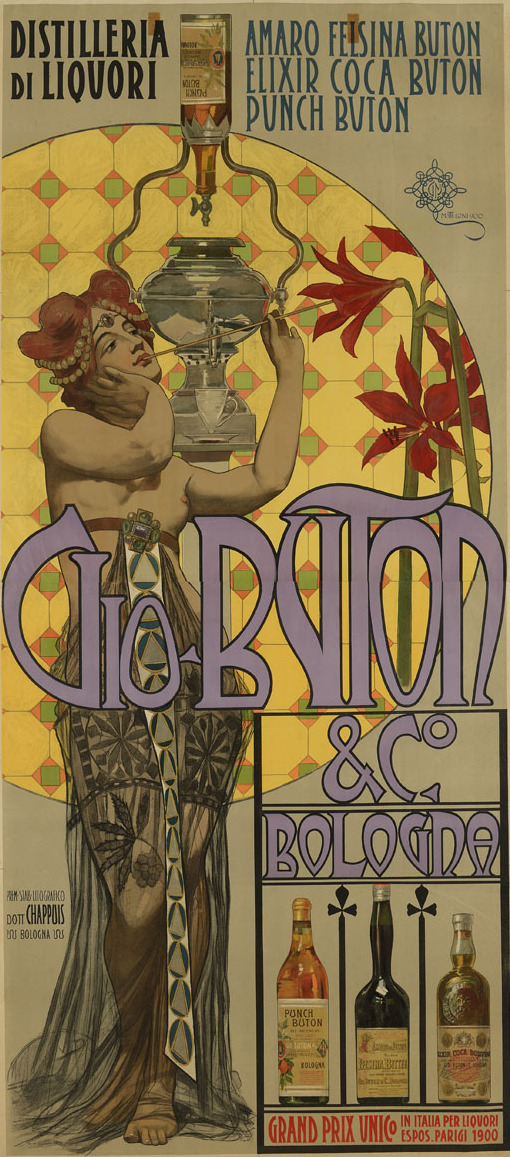
- Advertising poster for Giovanni Buton & Co., 1900
- Born: 24 June 1869; Rome, Papal States
- Died: 21 September 1944 (aged 75); Rome, Kingdom of Italy
- Known for: Poster art, graphic design
- Movement: Liberty style

Giovanni Maria Mataloni (24 July 1869 – 21 September 1944) was an Italian poster art designer and illustrator. Mataloni was an exponent of the Stile Liberty, the Italian Art Nouveau. Together with Leonetto Cappiello, Adolfo Hohenstein, Marcello Dudovich and Leopoldo Metlicovitz he is considered one of the progenitors of Italian poster design.

== Biography ==
Giovanni Maria Mataloni was born in Rome on 24 July 1869, to a family of noble origins. His father's family owned several paper mills in Pioraco, a small town in the province of Macerata. A leading figure in the Art Nouveau movement, he is widely regarded as one of the fathers of modern Italian poster art, alongside Leonetto Cappiello, Adolfo Hohenstein, Leopoldo Metlicovitz and Marcello Dudovich. He created his first poster in 1895, soon gaining international recognition as a poster artist. Jules Chéret reproduced one of his posters in the famous collection of lithographic plates Les Maîtres de l'affiche (1895–1900).

Mataloni collaborated with Ricordi and De Agostini, as well as the publishing houses Chappuis of Bologna and Bocca of Turin. He also worked with the magazines L'Illustrazione Italiana and La Tribuna Illustrata, as well as the Sicilian daily newspaper L'Ora. Mataloni held the chair of nude painting at the Accademia di Belle Arti di Roma, where he taught Umberto Boccioni. In 1908 he frescoed the dining room of the Gran Caffé Faraglia on Piazza Venezia and the Palazzo dell'Agricoltura, the seat of the Italian Ministry of Agriculture.

Despite his importance in the early nineteenth-century Italian artistic landscape, information about his later life remains scarce. During the 1920s and 1930s he worked for the cartography department of the De Agostini Institute. In his later years, he devoted himself to portraiture, particularly of children and women. He died on 21 September 1944 and was buried in the monumental cemetery of Campo Verano in Rome.

== Selected lithographs ==
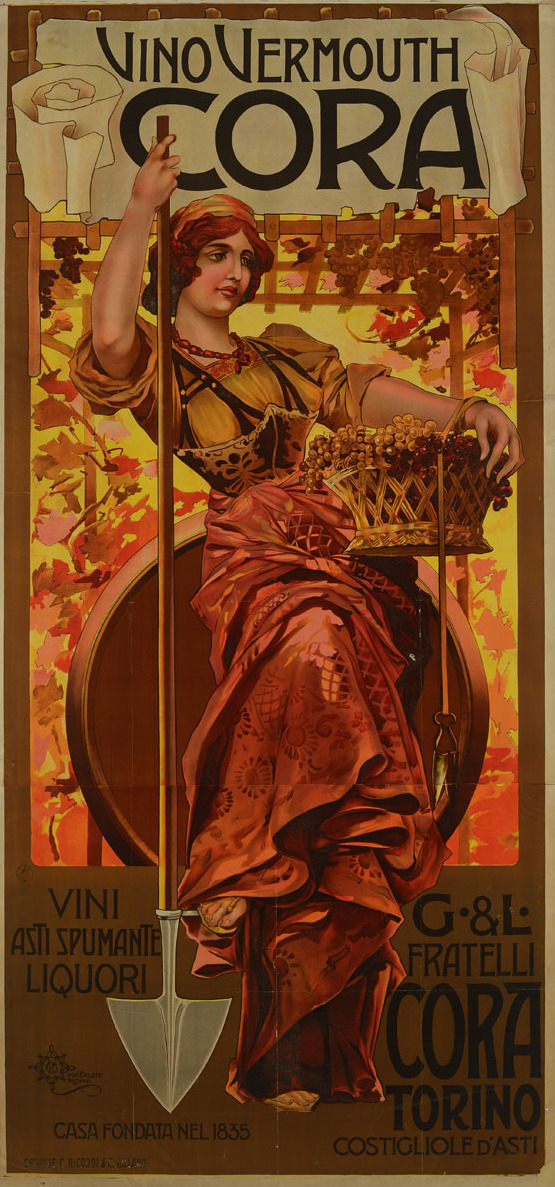
Advertising poster for the vermouth Cora, 1890s.

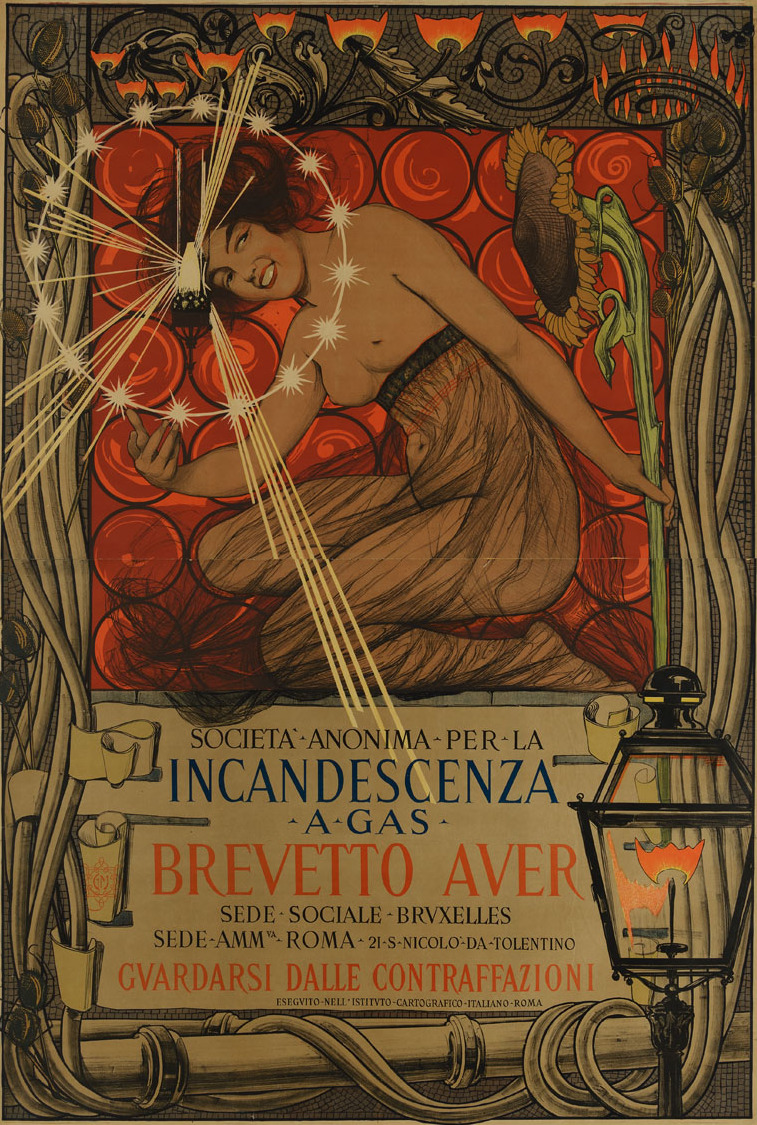
Advertising poster for Auer gas lamps, 1896.

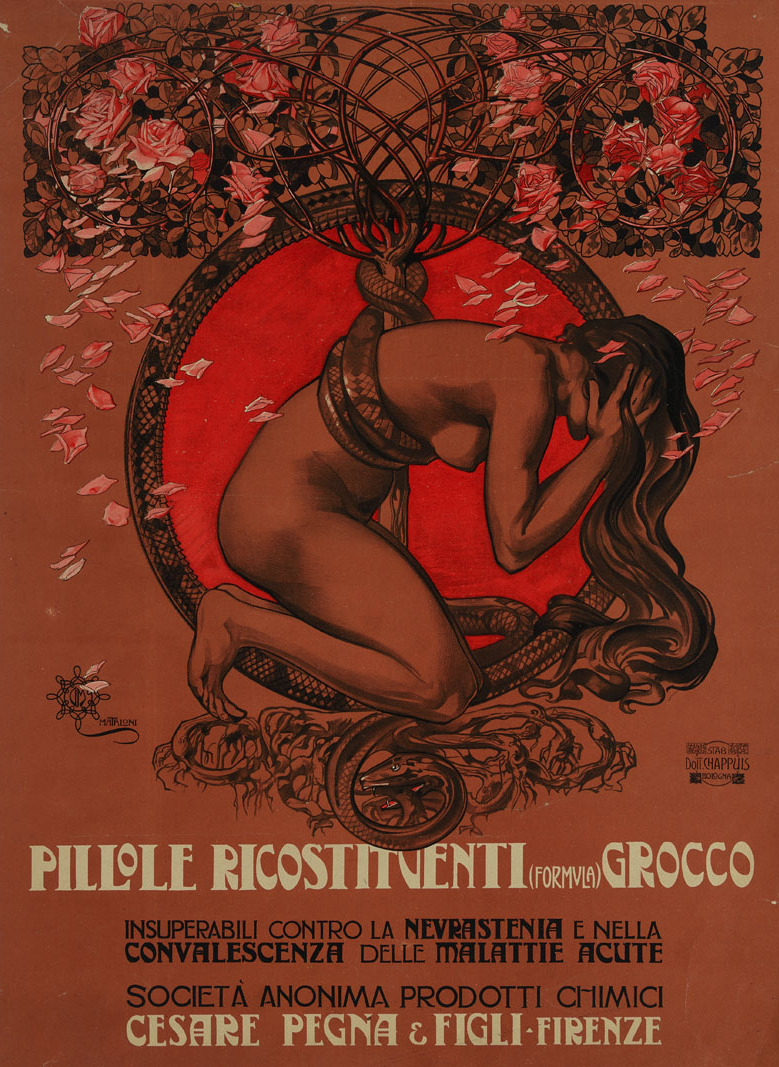
Advertising poster for Cesare Pegna & Figli, 1896.

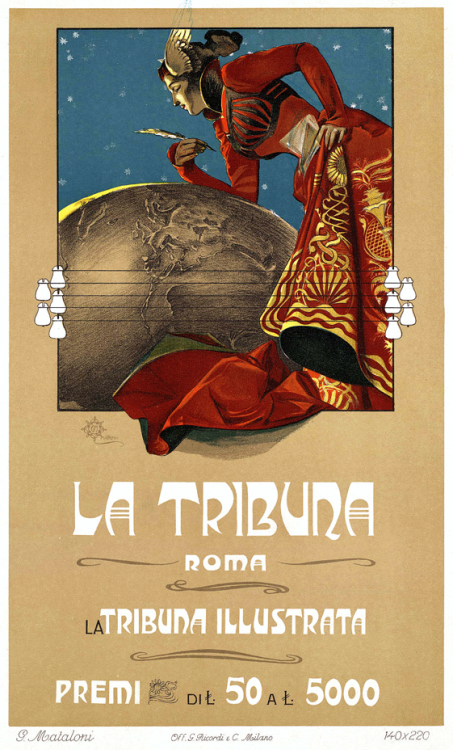
Illustration for the cover of La Tribuna Illustrata magazine, 1897.

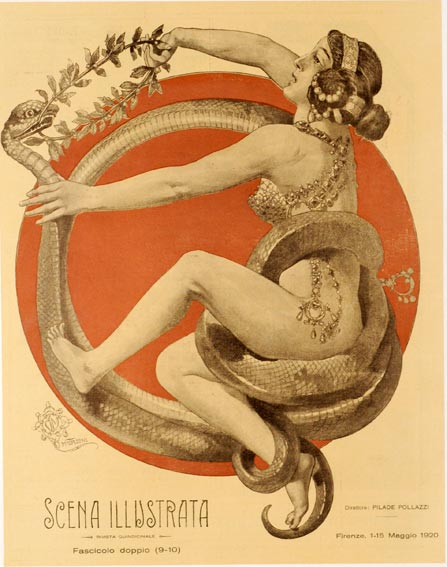
Poster advertising the magazine La Scena Illustrata, 1900.

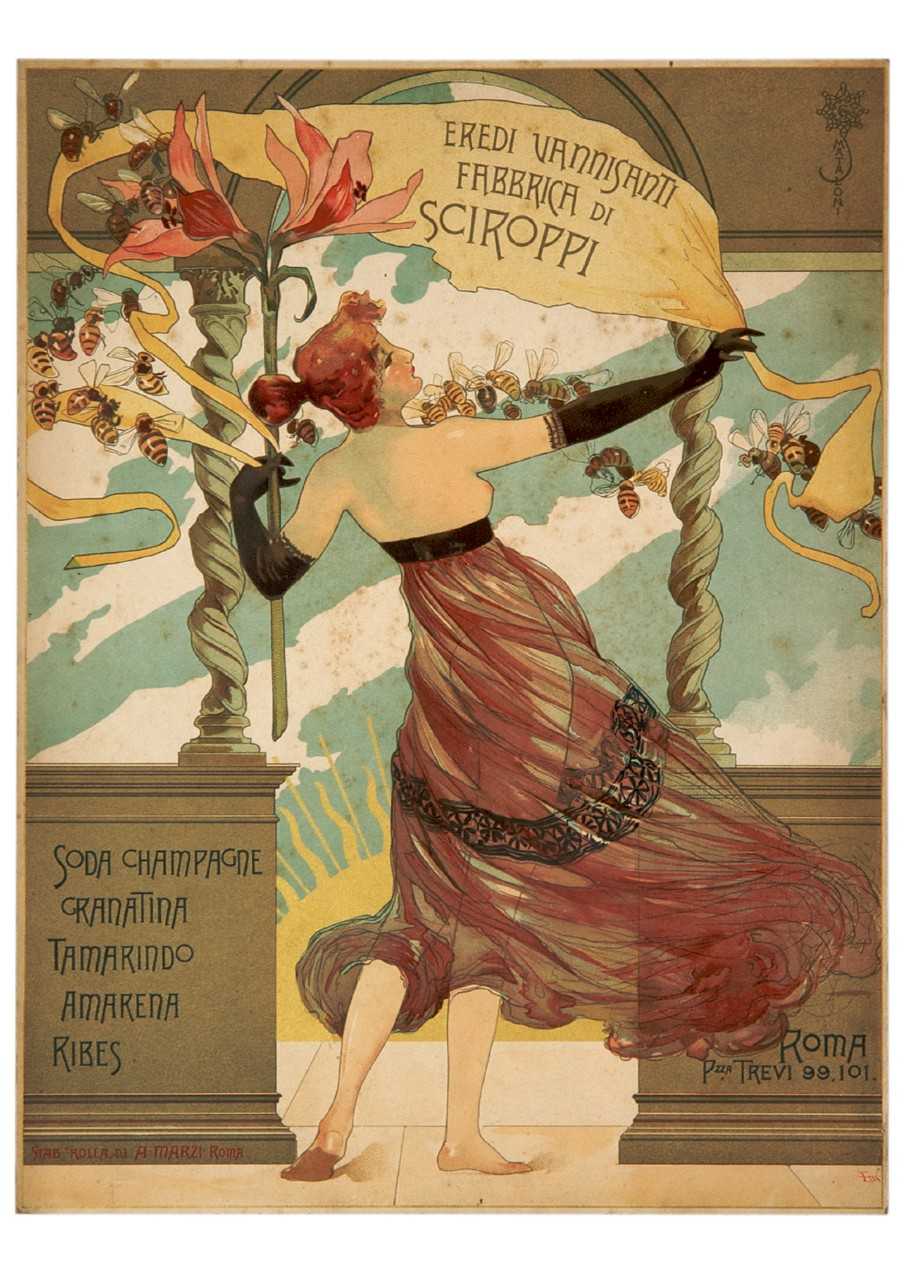
Advertising poster for Eredi Vannisanti, 1900s.

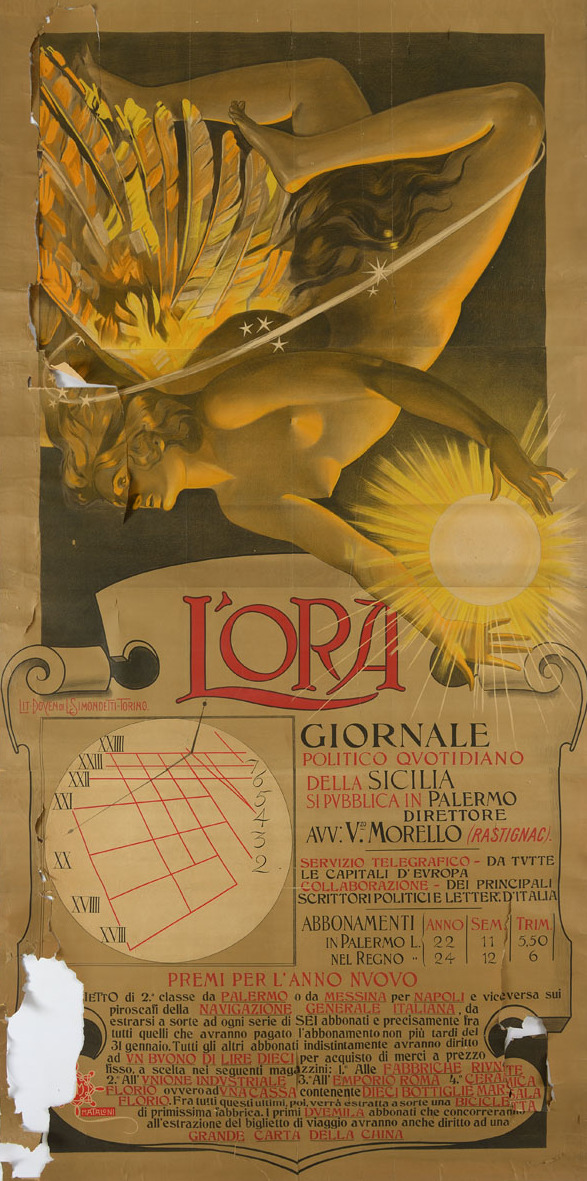
Advertising poster for the Sicilian newspaper L'Ora, 1900s.

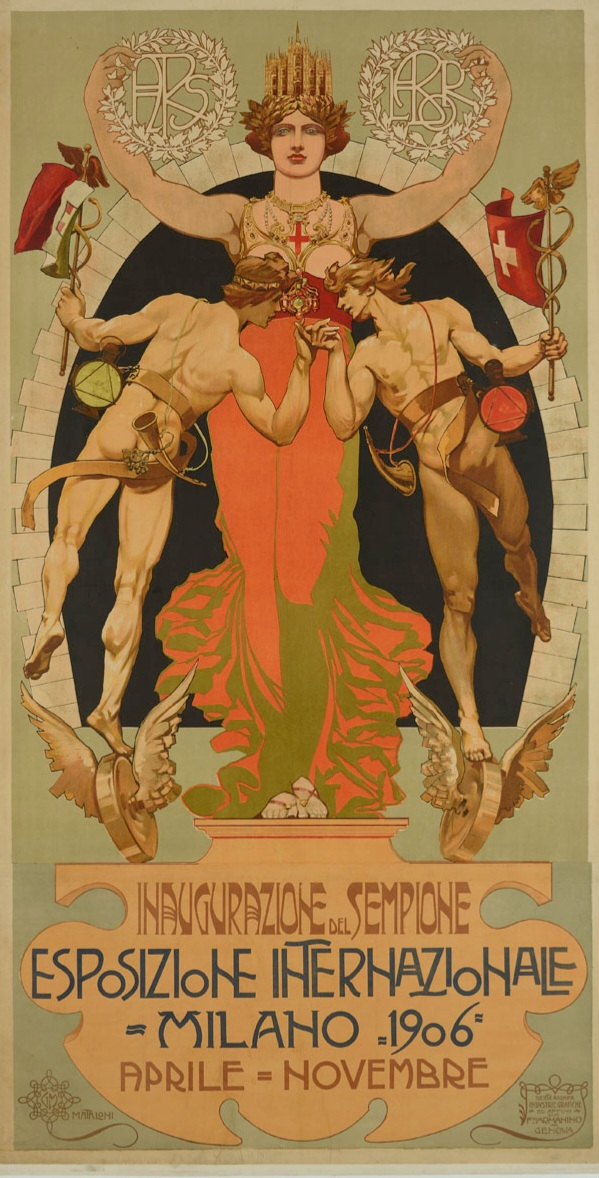
Milan 1906 Expo poster

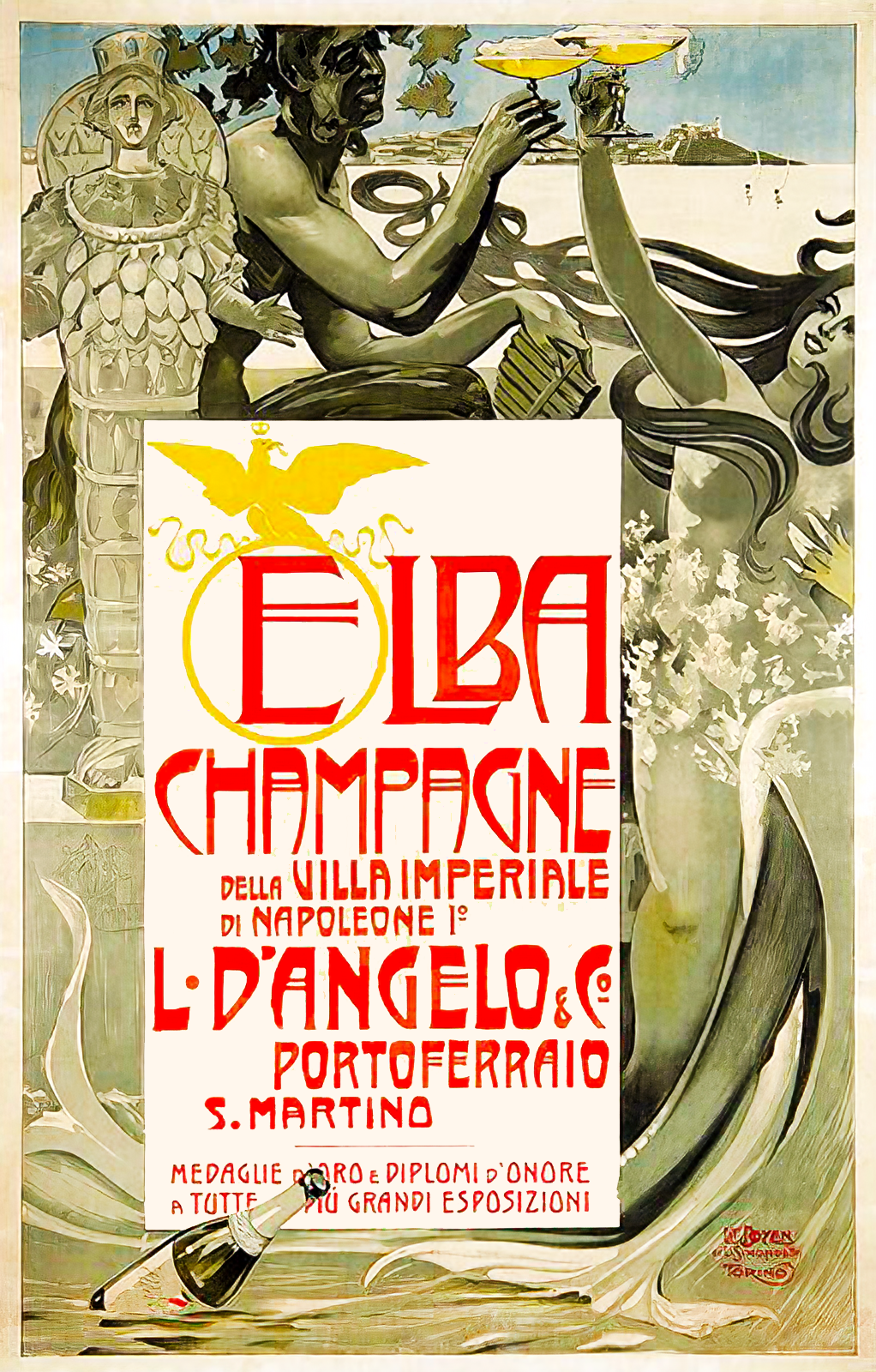
Advertising poster for Elba Champagne, 1910s.

== Bibliography ==
- Weill, Alain (1985). The Poster: A Worldwide Survey and History. Boston: G.K. Hall.
- Bellazzecca, Enrico (2009). "MATALONI, Giovanni". Dizionario Biografico degli Italiani (in Italian). Vol. 72: Massimo–Mechetti. Rome: Istituto dell'Enciclopedia Italiana. ISBN 978-88-12-00032-6.
