= Leopoldo Metlicovitz =

Italian painter

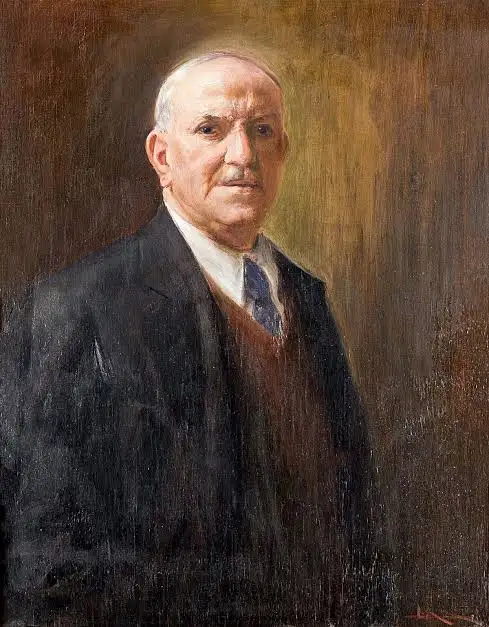
- Self-portrait, c. 1930, Trieste, Museo Revoltella
- Born: 17 July 1868; Trieste, Austria-Hungary
- Died: 19 November 1944 (aged 76); Ponte Lambro, Italian Social Republic
- Known for: Poster art, graphic design
- Movement: Art Nouveau

Leopoldo Metlicovitz (17 July 1868 – 19 October 1944) was an Italian painter, illustrator and poster designer.

Together with Leonetto Cappiello, Adolf Hohenstein, Giovanni Maria Mataloni and Marcello Dudovich, he is considered one of the fathers of modern Italian poster art.

== Biography ==
Son of a merchant of Dalmatian origins (the family name was originally Metlicovich), he began working in the family business at a very young age and at fourteen years old he entered as an apprentice in a printing house in Udine, where he learned the technique of lithography. Here he is noticed by Giulio Ricordi, owner of the homonymous musical house and of the Officine Grafiche, who invites him to move to Milan to complete his training.

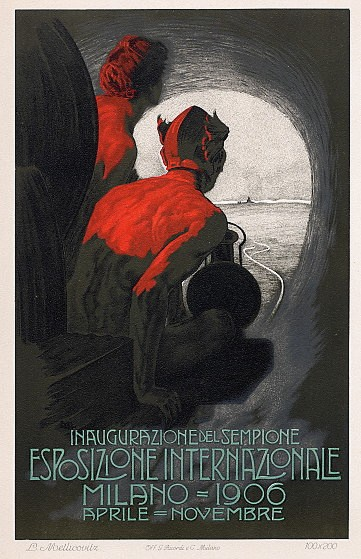
Official poster of the Milan International Exhibition, 1906

From 1888 to 1892 he collaborated with Tensi, a photographic products company, and in 1892 he joined Ricordi as technical director. At first he practiced transposing the works of other famous poster artists such as Hohenstein and Mataloni onto lithographic stone, then his pictorial talent was increasingly appreciated and he began creating posters and illustrations for Ricordi's music editions. Many of the works of the most famous composers of the time are advertised on posters signed by Metlicovitz: from those of Giacomo Puccini such as Tosca (1900), Madama Butterfly (1904) and Turandot (1926) to Iris by Pietro Mascagni (1898), to Conchita by Riccardo Zandonai (1911). At the end of the nineteenth century, the Grandi Magazzini Mele of Naples entrusted Officine Ricordi with their own advertising campaign for their clothing, one of the first on a large scale, and the artifices of success were the posters created by Metlicovitz together with Aleardo Terzi, Dudovich, Cappiello and others.

In 1906, on the occasion of the great Universal Exhibition in Milan, Metlicovitz won the competition for the poster that symbolized the fair, dedicated to the Simplon Tunnel, making a name for himself as a poster designer. There are dozens of magazine covers, scores and opera librettos published by Ricordi, which bear his signature including the magazines Music and Musicians (1902-1905) and Ars et Labor (1906-1912), his work as an illustrator also appears on La Lettura (1906-1907, 1909) monthly in Corriere della Sera.

Especially from the beginning of the twentieth century, the Officine Grafiche Ricordi began to sell various products that were the fruit of a merchandising ante-litteram, thanks to the entrepreneurial spirit of Giulio Ricordi, and many of them bore the signature of Leopoldo Metlicovitz, such as the Almanacco Verdiano of 1902 or the series of illustrated postcards on musical themes, such as those for the operas La Bohème, Tosca, Madama Butterfly or Germania by Alberto Franchetti.

Between 1907 and 1910 Metlicovitz, on behalf of Ricordi, went twice to Buenos Aires; in the meantime he had married Elvira Lazzaroni, by whom he had two children: Roberto (1908-?) and Leopolda (1912–2008). In 1914 Metlicovitz is also one of the designers, together with Armando Vassallo, Luigi Caldanzano and Adolfo De Carolis, involved in the launch of the film Cabiria, a colossal of silent screenplay by Gabriele D'Annunzio, for which he will create four posters. He also designed the trademark that is still used today by Fratelli Branca Distillerie, the producers of Fernet Branca, depicting an eagle with spread wings holding a bottle of the liqueur above a globe.

After ending his collaboration with Casa Ricordi in 1938, he concentrated more and more on painting, preferring landscapes and portraits and participating in the first editions of the Cremona Prize (1939-1940). On 19 October 1944 he died in his house in Ponte Lambro, where he had moved permanently in 1915.

== Artistic activity ==
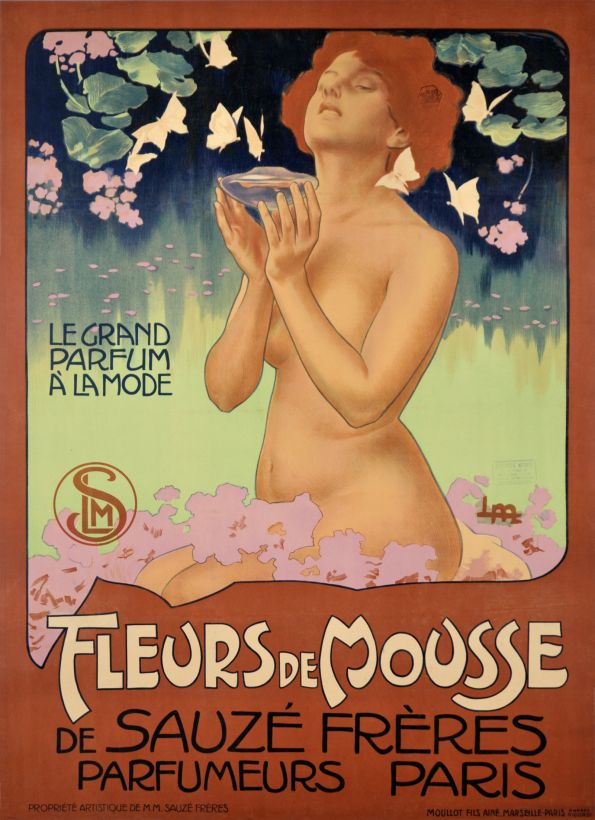
Fleurs de mousse, 1898

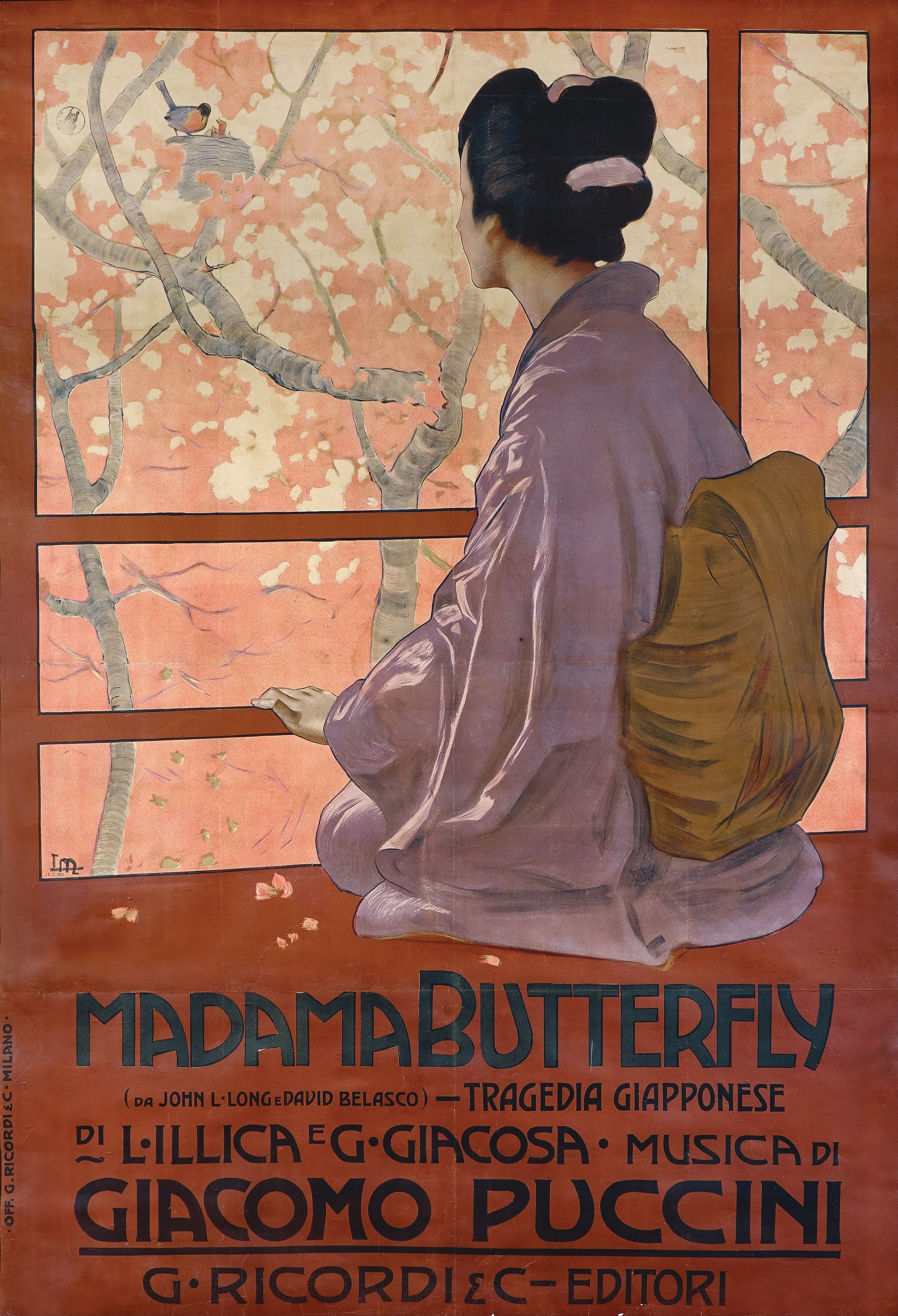
Madama Butterfly, 1904

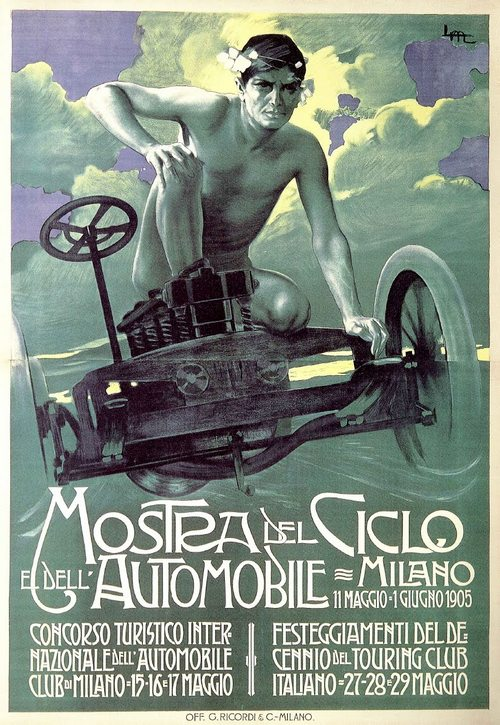
Mostra del ciclo, 1905

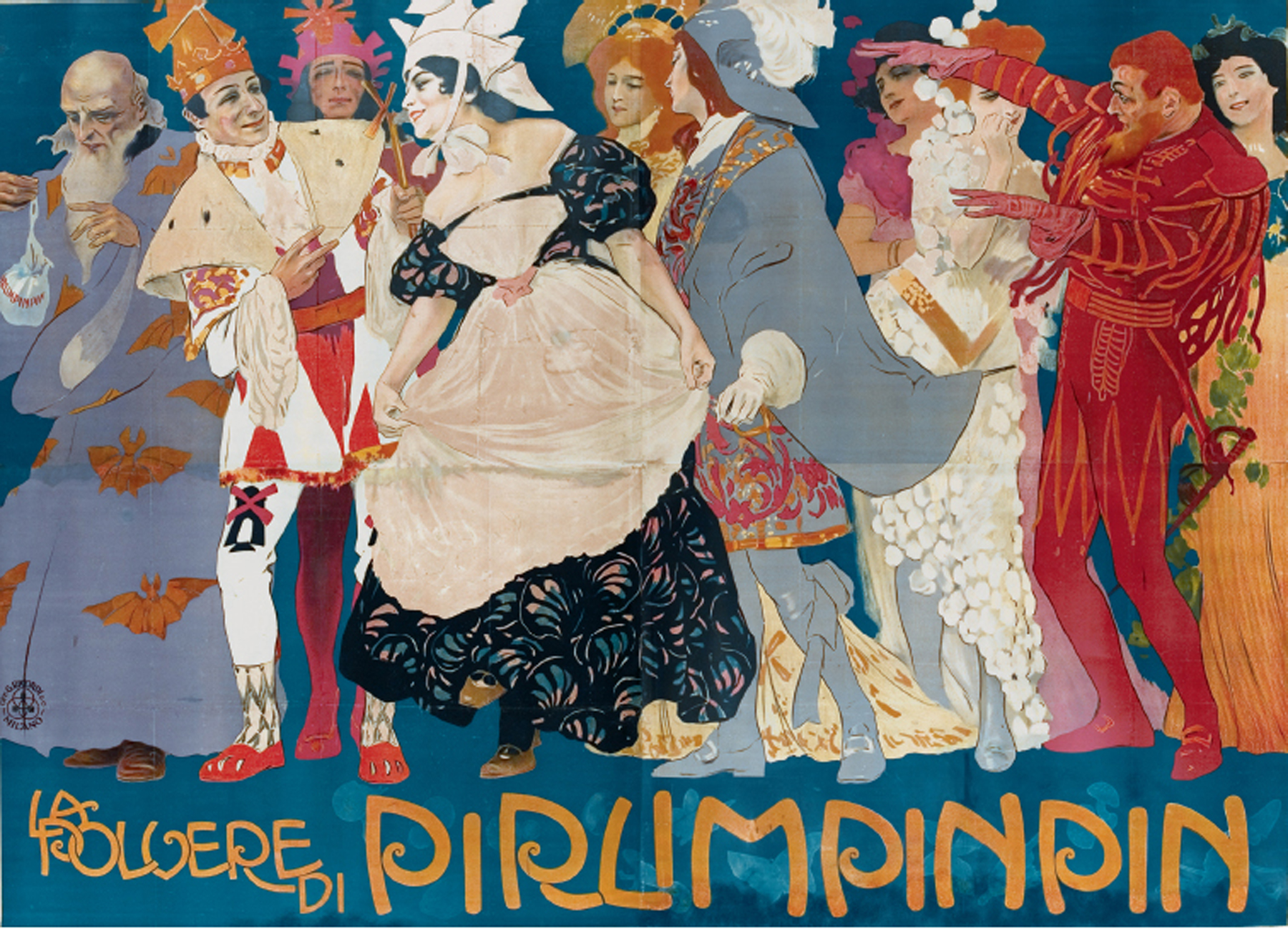
Pirlimpinpin, 1907

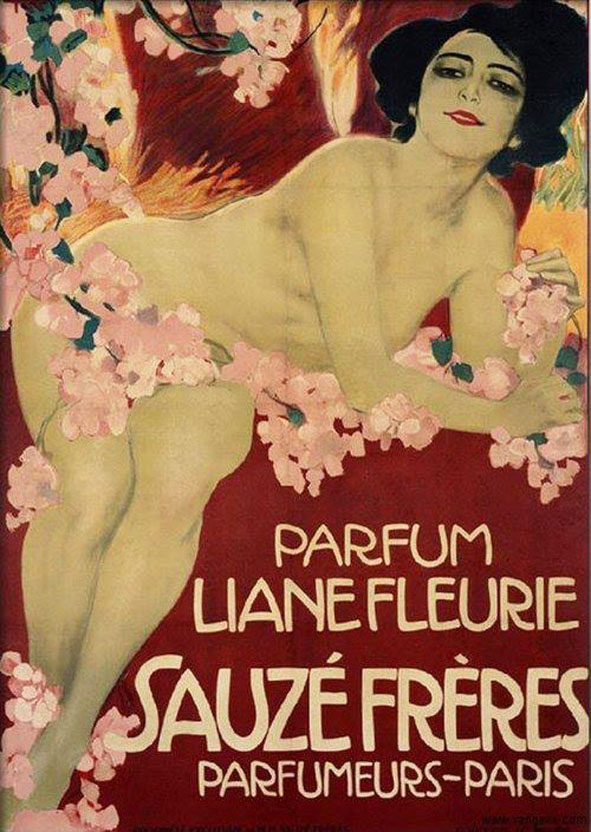
Liane Fleurie Sauzé Frères, 1911

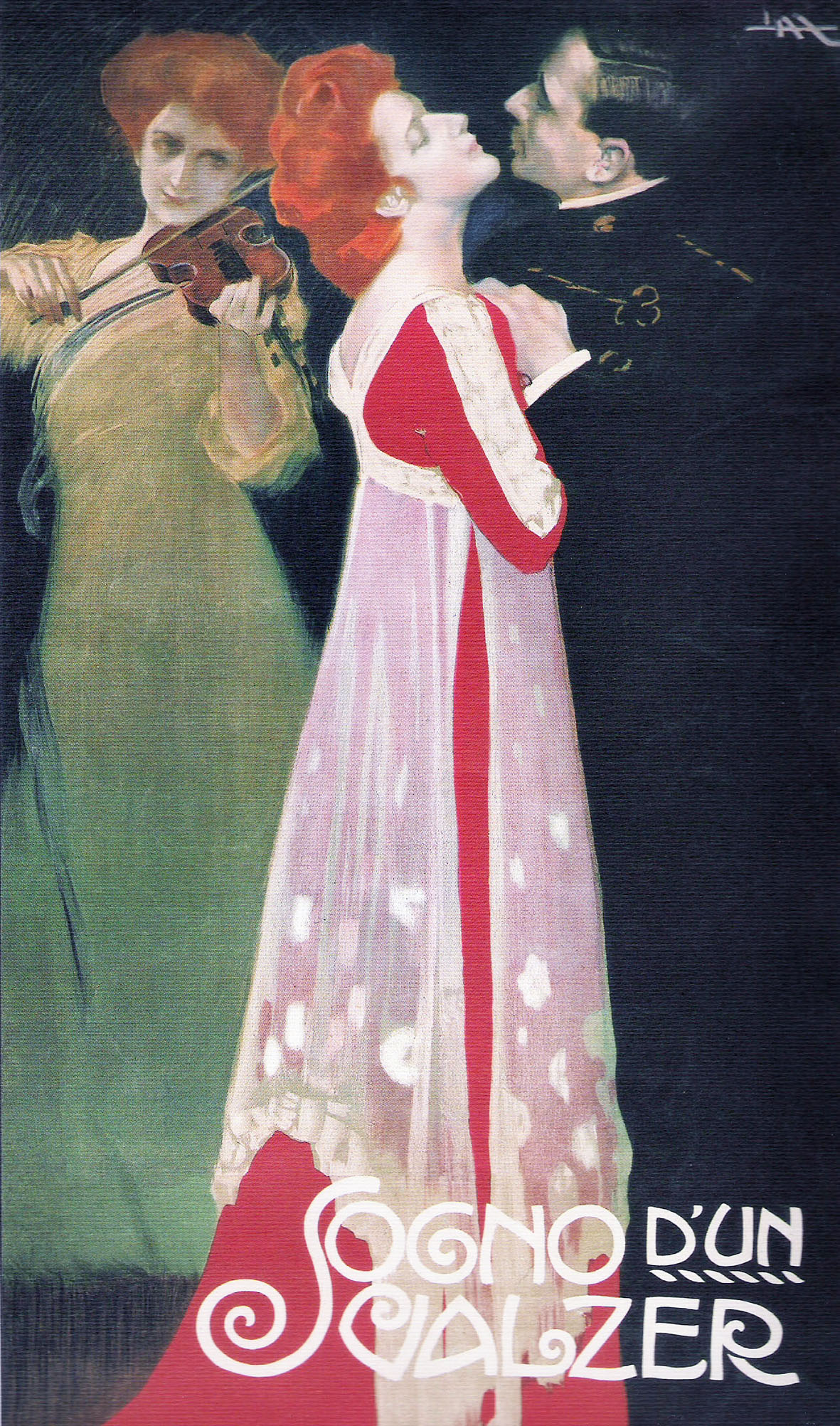
Sogno di un valzer

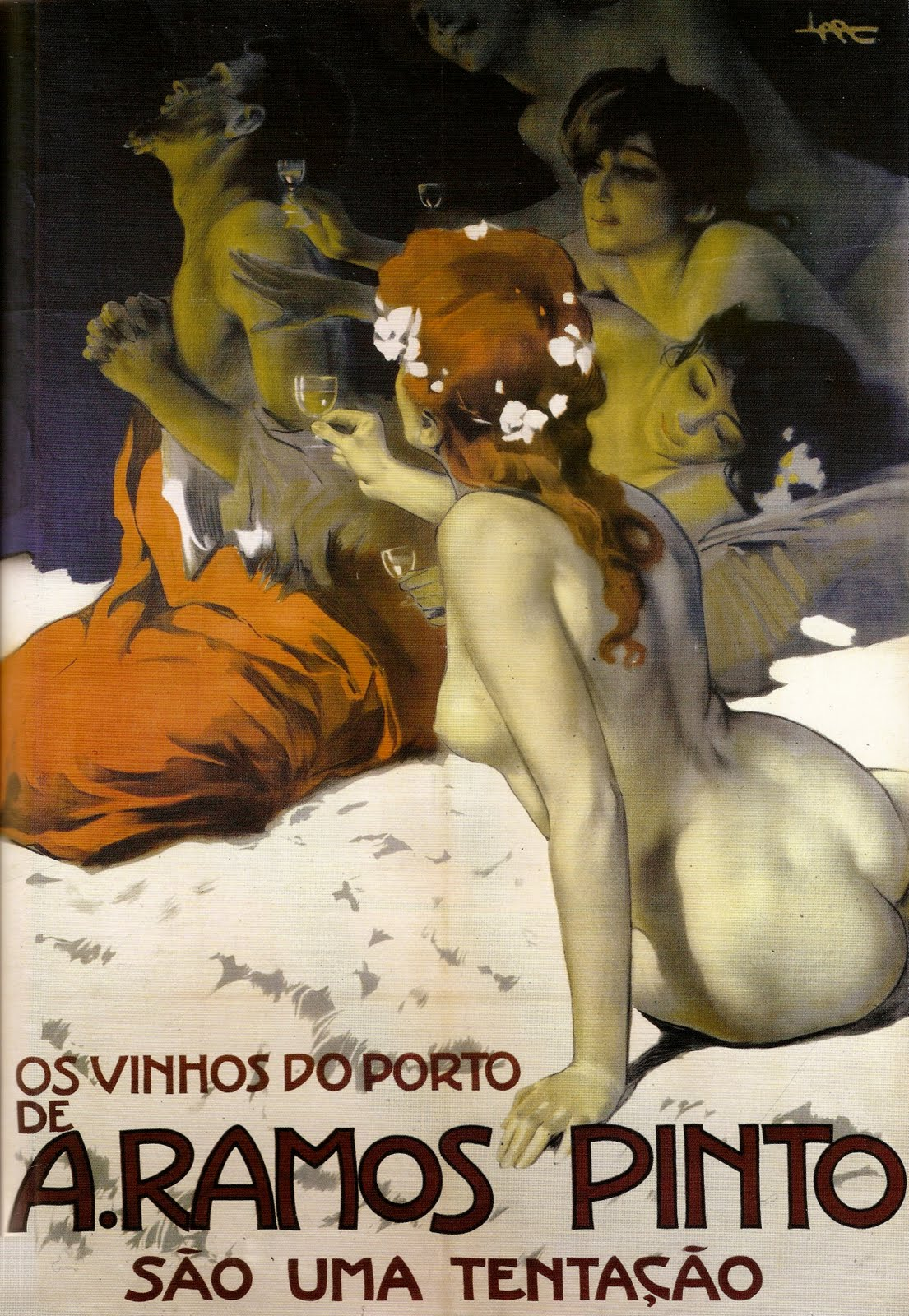
A. Ramos Pinto, 1915

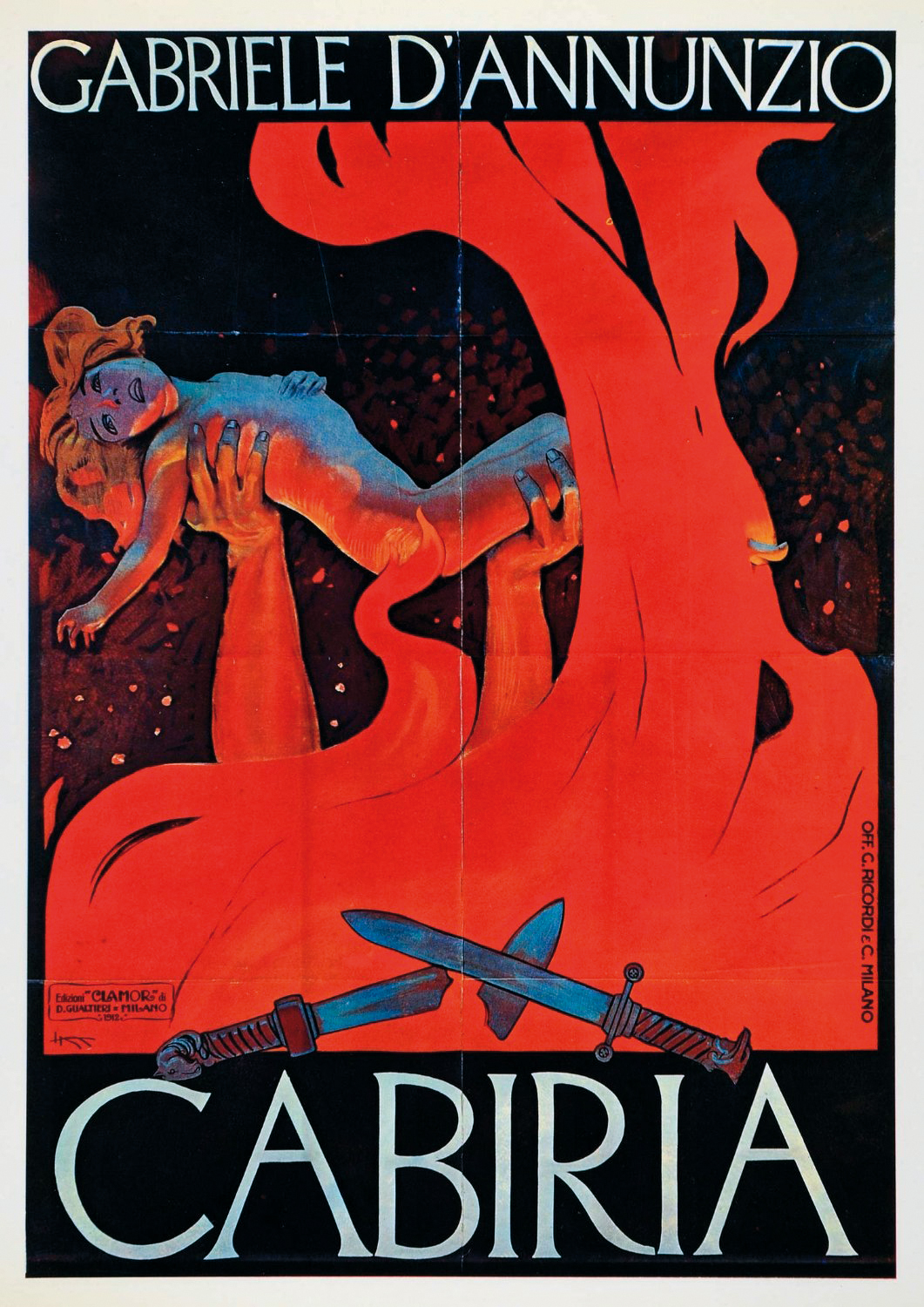
Advertising poster for Giovanni Pastrone's Cabiria

=== Posters ===
==== Theater and music ====
- 1898 - Iris, opera by Pietro Mascagni
- 1899 - The free colony, opera by Pietro Floridia
- 1900 - Anton, opera by Cesare Galeotti
- 1900 - Tosca, opera by Giacomo Puccini
- 1901 - Lorenza, opera by Edoardo Mascheroni
- 1904 - Madama Butterfly, opera by Giacomo Puccini
- 1905 - Amica, opera by Pietro Mascagni
- 1905 - Giovanni Gallurese, opera by Italo Montemezzi
- 1907 - Comic and operetta company directed by Giulio Marchetti
- 1907 - Hans the flute player, opera by Louis Ganne
- 1908 - The cricket of the hearth, opera by Riccardo Zandonai
- 1908 - The dust of Pirlimpinpin, by Costantino Lombardo
- 1909 - Manon Lescaut, opera by Giacomo Puccini, edition of Teatro alla Scala
- 1910 - Dream of a waltz, by Oscar Straus
- 1910 - Italian comic opera company Scognamiglio Caramba
- 1911 - Phonotype. The tenor comm. G.Anselmi
- 1911 - Conchita, opera of Riccardo Zandonai
- 1911 - Quo Vadis...?, opera of J.Nougues
- 1912 - Melenis, opera by Riccardo Zandonai
- 1913 - Amore in maschera, opera by Yvan de Hartulary Darclée
- 1916 - The blue spider, operetta by Alberto Randegger
- 1919 - Gianni Schicchi, opera by Giacomo Puccini, Italian premiere
- 1919 - Suor Angelica, opera by Giacomo Puccini, Italian premiere
- 1919 - Il tabarro, opera by Giacomo Puccini, Italian premiere
- 1922 - Romeo and Juliet, opera by Riccardo Zandonai
- 1925 - Santa Cruz Company
- 1926 - Turandot, opera by Giacomo Puccini
- 1926 - Clara Weiss

==== Cinema ====
- 1911 - The Divine Comedy "Inferno" - Milano Films
- 1913 - Germany - Savoy Film Torino
- 1913 - William Tell
- 1914 - Cabiria
- 1915 - Pagliacci, by Francesco Bertolini
- 1915 - Zinga - Itala Film Torino
- 1916 - The fire, by Giovanni Pastrone
- 1916 - Tigre reale, by Giovanni Pastrone

==== Others ====
- 1896 ca. - La Sera
- 1897 - Fleurs de Mousse de Sauzé Frères parfumeurs Paris
- 1897 - Distillerie Italiane Gas Alcohol Appliances - Milan
- 1898 - E. & A. Mele & C. - Umbrellas of every kind - Rich assortments
- 1899 - Liebig. Real meat extract
- 1904 - Packages for men - Mele & C.- Naples
- 1905 ca. - Bitter Shepherd Milan
- 1906 - Flouvella de Sauzé Frères parfumeurs Paris
- 1908 ca. - Packs and novelties for children maximum cheap. Mele & C. - Naples
- 1908 - Superator. Alcohol gas stove
- 1909 - Mode novelties. Maximum good market. Apples & C. - Naples
- 1909 - Automobile Club di Milan - Inauguration of the new seat
- 1909 - L'Ora - Corriere Politico Quotidiano della Sicilia
- 1911 - Liane Fleurie Sauzé Frères
- 1911 - Mele & C. Massimo buon mercato
- 1911 ca. - Os vinhos do Porto de A. Ramos Pinto São uma tentação
- 1912 ca. - Sangemini natural mineral water
- 1912 ca. - Mavridès' Cigarette Cairo
- 1913 - La Rinascente
- 1913 - Turin Cirié Lanzo railway line
- 1914 - Shoe factory of Varese.Sardi Trolli & C. concessionaires
- 1920 - National Insurance Institute
- 1920-30 - Sangemini natural mineral water
- 1921 - The paradise of the Dolomites Hotel Misurina and Hotel Alpino
- 1921 - Waterproofs Ettore Moretti Milan
- 1923 - Bottega della gomma Milan
- 1925 - Zara
- 1925 ca. - Pola Venezia Giulia
- 1925 - Company of ferry-boats for England
- 1926 - Antigelone Cagnola
- 1927 - Milan Fede jams
- 1933 - Ettore Moretti Milan waterproof tires
- 1933 - Villa Margherita Como Lido
- 1937 - Tripoli Lottery
- n.d. - Corriere delle Signore - F. Treves Editori Milan
- n.a. - Chile soda nitrate - nitrogenous fertilizer
- n.a. - Fides Italian Cognac
- n.a. - Chianti Melini
- n.a. - Buitoni milk flour

==== Events ====
- 1905 - Exhibition of the Bicycle and Automobile Milan
- 1906 - Inauguration of Sempione - International Exhibition - Milan
- 1907 - Launching of the royal ship "Roma" at La Spezia
- 1911 - International exhibition of industry and work - Turin
- 1911 - Varese Horse Fair, April 17-18-19
- 1913 - Busseto centenary celebrations 1813-1913, Verdi's centenary
- 1914 - Greek Theater of Syracuse - Agamemnon of Aeschylus
- 1921 - San Pellegrino Grand Season May–October
- 1923 - Teatro Solis Grandes Veglioni Carnaval - Montevideo
- 1925 - Erba Incino Equestrian Competition, 10-11-12 October

=== Pictorial works ===
- Portrait of Arrigo Boito, oil on canvas
- Portrait of Giuseppe Verdi, oil on canvas
- Tosca, 6 watercolors for series of postcards
- Madama Butterfly, 12 watercolors for series of postcards
- Germany, 10 watercolors for series of postcards
- Verdi in Sant'Agata, 7 watercolors for series of postcards
- Aida, watercolor for Almanacco Verdiano
- Otello, watercolor for Almanac Verdiano

== Bibliography ==
- Mocci, Laura (2010). "METLICOVITZ, Leopoldo". Dizionario Biografico degli Italiani (in Italian). Vol. 74: Messi–Miraglia. Rome: Istituto dell'Enciclopedia Italiana. ISBN 978-88-12-00032-6.
- Ginex, Giovanna (2001). Metlicovitz, Dudovich: grandi cartellonisti triestini: manifesti della Raccolta Achille Bertarelli del Castello Sforzesco di Milano. Milan: Skira. ISBN 978-8884911841.
- Mori, Giovanna (2004). Le vacanze degli italiani attraverso i Manifesti Storici della Raccolta Bertarelli. Cinisello Balsamo: Silvana Editoriale. ISBN 978-8882157890.

== Other projects ==
- Wikiquote contiene citazioni di o su Leopoldo Metlicovitz
- Wikimedia Commons contiene immagini o altri file su Leopoldo Metlicovitz
