= Adolfo Hohenstein =

German painter (1854–1928)

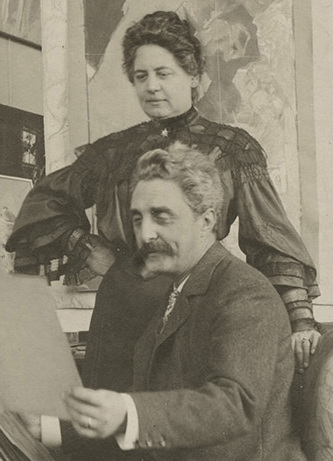
- Hohenstein with his wife Edwig in 1905
- Born: 18 March 1854; St. Petersburg, Russian Empire
- Died: 12 April 1928 (aged 74); Bonn, Germany
- Known for: Painting, Illustration, Decorative art
- Notable work: Tosca and La Bohème posters, Campari ads
- Movement: Art Nouveau, called Stile Liberty in Italy

Adolfo Hohenstein (18 March 1854 – 12 April 1928) was a German painter, advertiser, illustrator, set designer and costume designer. Hohenstein is considered the father of Italian poster art and an exponent of the Stile Liberty, the Italian Art Nouveau. Together with Leonetto Cappiello, Giovanni Mario Mataloni, Leopoldo Metlicovitz and Marcello Dudovich, he is considered one of the most important Italian poster designers.

== Early years ==
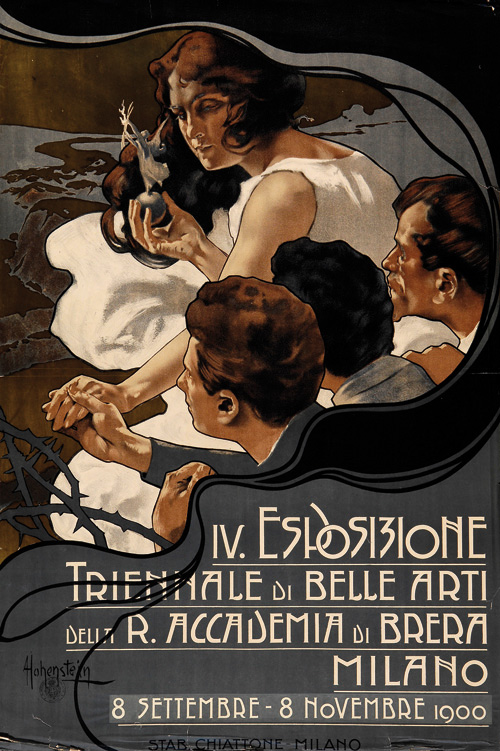
Adolf Hohenstein - IV Triennial exhibition of fine arts Milan, 1900

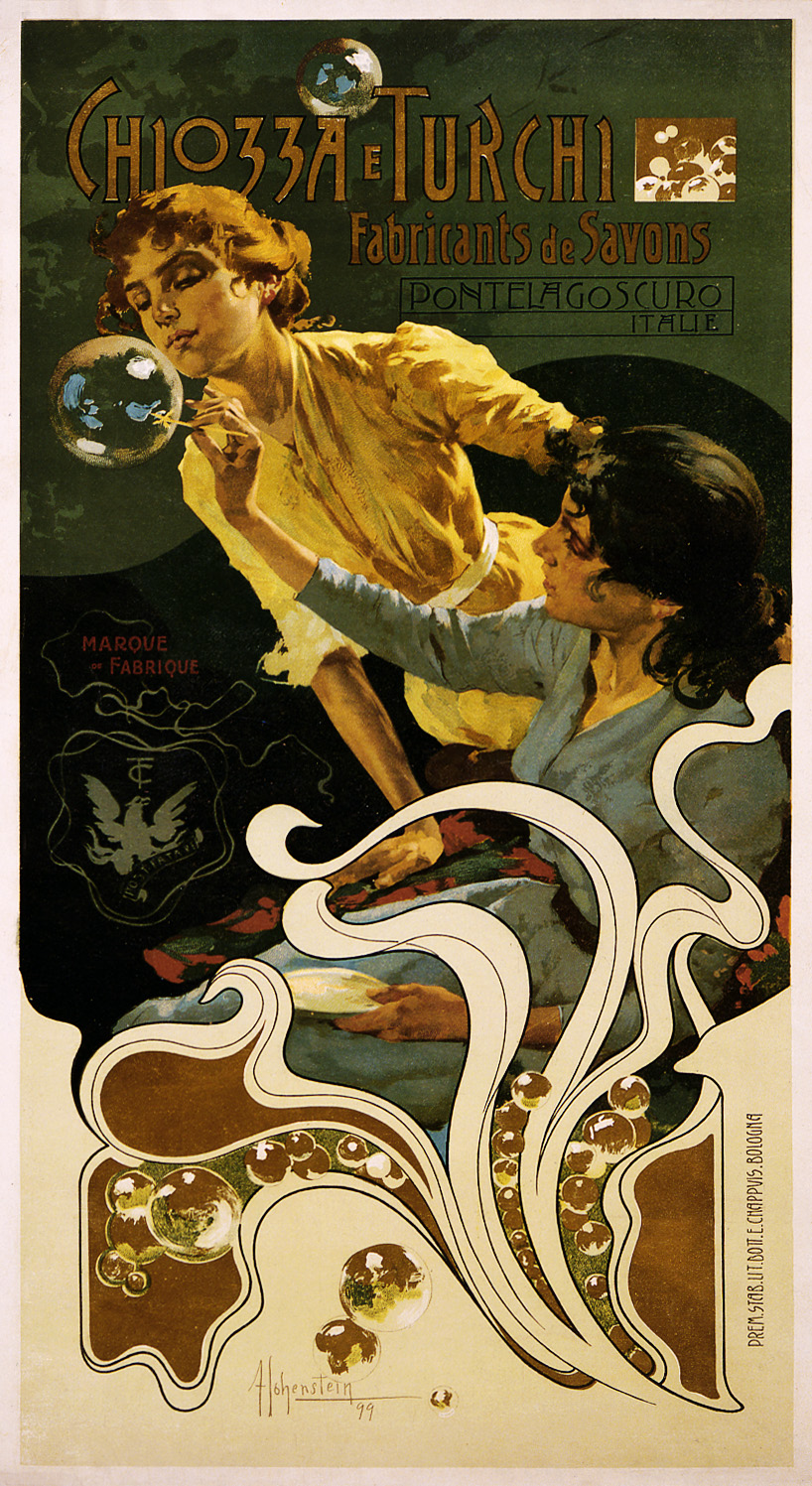
1899 advertising poster

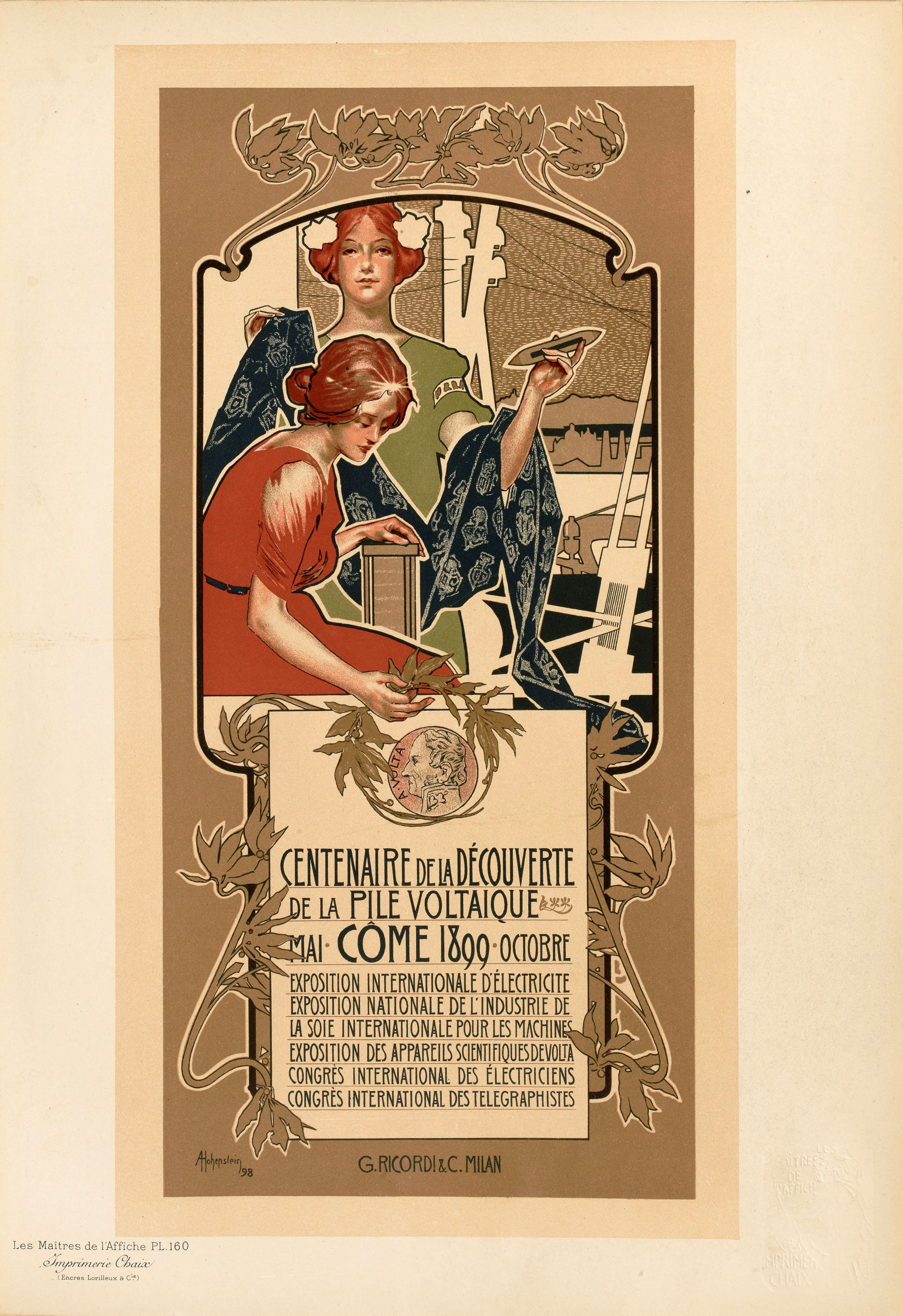
Poster 160 in Les Maîtres de l'Affiche

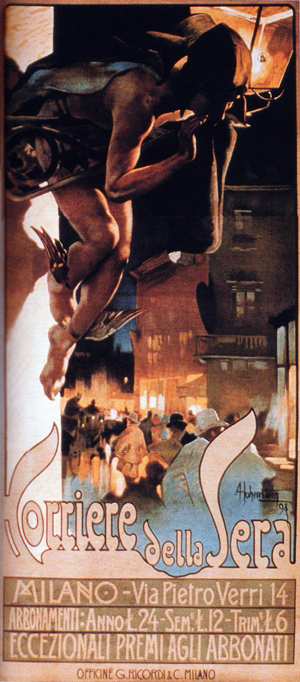
Poster for Corriere della Sera newspaper (1898).

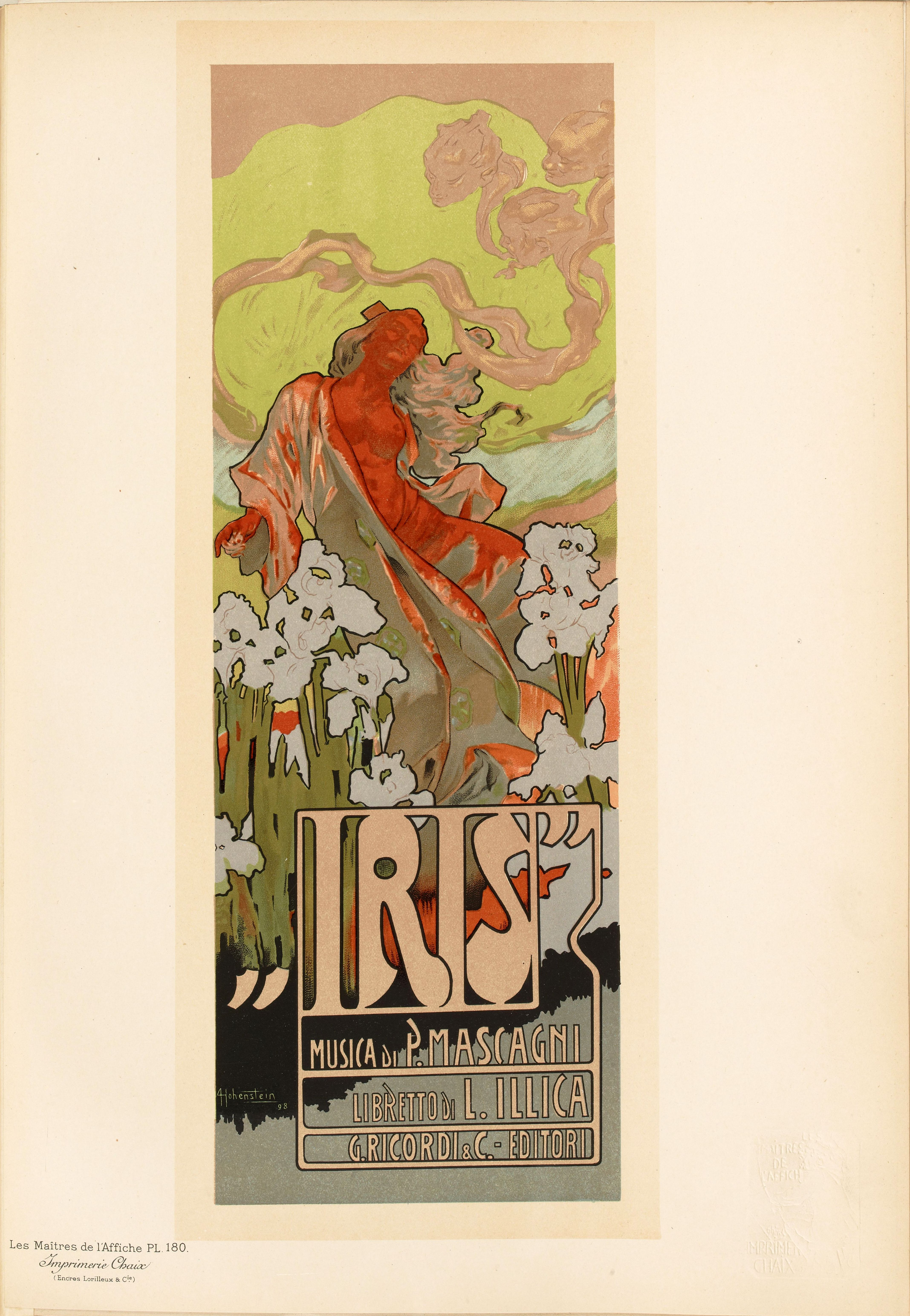
Poster 180 in Les Maîtres de l'Affiche

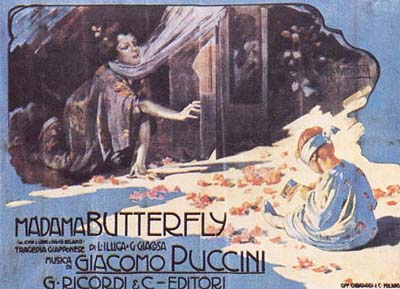
Poster for Madama Butterfly by Giacomo Puccini (1904).

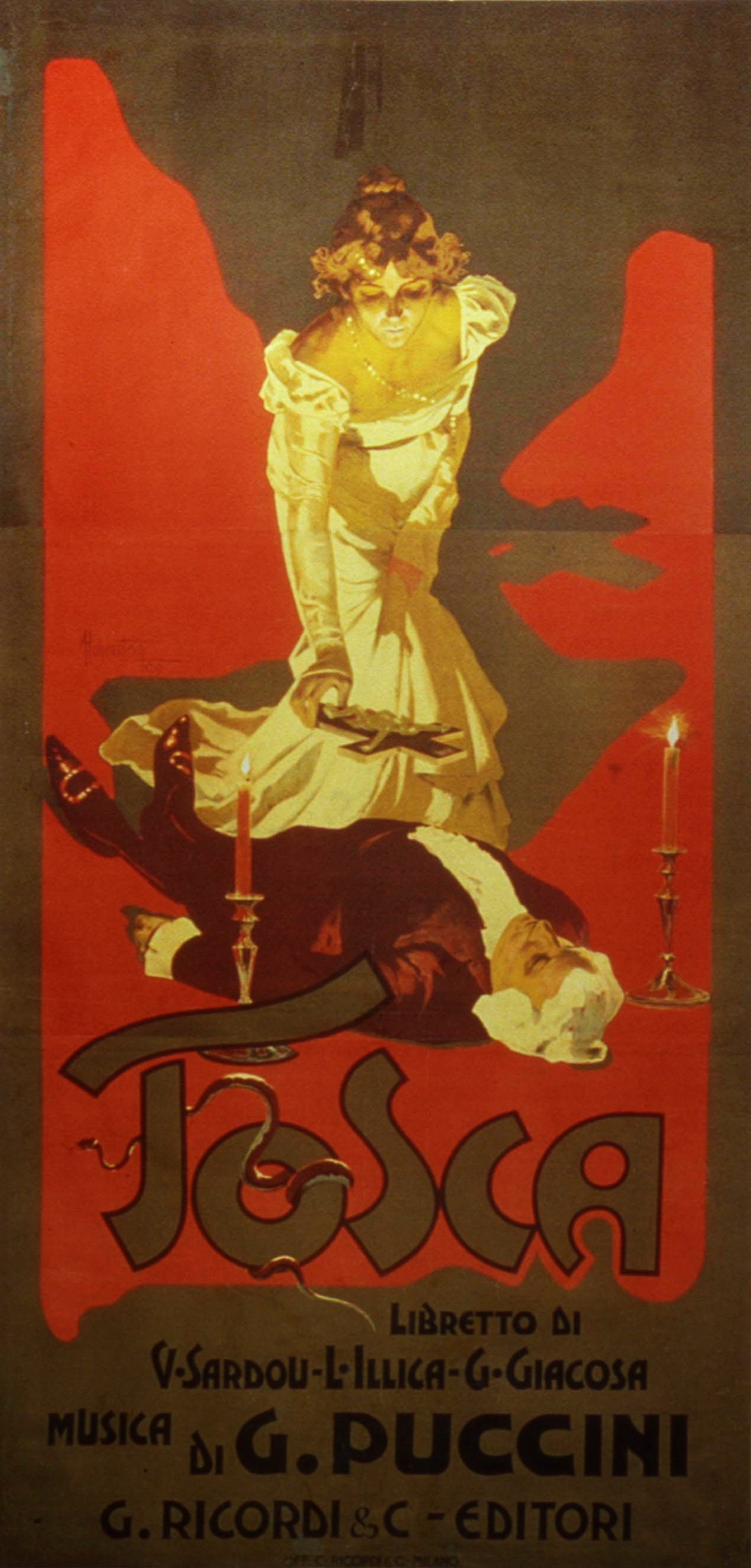
Poster for Tosca by Giacomo Puccini (1899).

Adolfo Hohenstein was born in Saint Petersburg, the capital of Russian Empire, to German parents, Julius and Laura Irack. His father was a forest engineer, whose career prompted him to travel extensively. Adolfo moved to Vienna where he grew up and completed his studies. His travels took him to India, where he decorated the houses of the local nobility.

== The Italian experience ==
In 1879, he settled down in Milan, Italy. He became a set and costume designer for La Scala and other theatres. There he met the musical publisher Giulio Ricordi, and in 1889 began to work for the Ricordi Graphical Workshops, where he shortly became the artistic director in charge of the graphical part. He created the posters for La Bohème and Tosca, as well as publicity for Campari, Buitoni and Corriere della Sera, numerous postcards, covers for scores and booklets. His work continued to cover the theatrical dimension: scenarios and wardrobes for several works, among them Giuseppe Verdi's Falstaff (1893) and a major part of the works of Giacomo Puccini, from the sketches of Le Villi (1884) to posters of Madama Butterfly (1904). At Ricordi's he had as colleague Giovanni Mario Mataloni and as students Leopoldo Metlicovitz and Marcello Dudovich.

== Return to Germany ==
In the first years of the 1900s, after marrying Katharina Plaskuda, a widow, he traveled more and more frequently between Italy and Germany till 1906, when, after winning the competition for the graphical symbol and the poster for the "Esposizione per il Traforo del Sempione", he left Milan for Bonn and Düsseldorf definitively. He settled in Bonn in 1918. The German years saw him engaged mostly as a painter and involved in the decoration of numerous buildings, among them one of the first in constructed reinforced concrete in Renania (1911). He is associated with the Düsseldorf school of painting.

Adolfo Hohenstein died in Bonn 12 April 1928.

== Main poster works ==
- 1898 – Corriere della Sera
- 1898 – Cintura Calliano contro il mal di mare
- 1899 – Onoranze a Volta nel centenario della pila
- 1899 – Cesare Urtis & Co. Torino. Forniture electriche
- 1900 – Esposizione d'Igiene
- 1900 – Monte Carlo. Tir aux pigeons
- 1900 – Monaco. Exposition et concours de canots automobiles
- 1901 – Bitter Campari
- 1905 – Fiammiferi senza fosforo del Dottor Craveri
- 1906 – Birra Italia

== Main theatre works (Ricordi Archives) ==
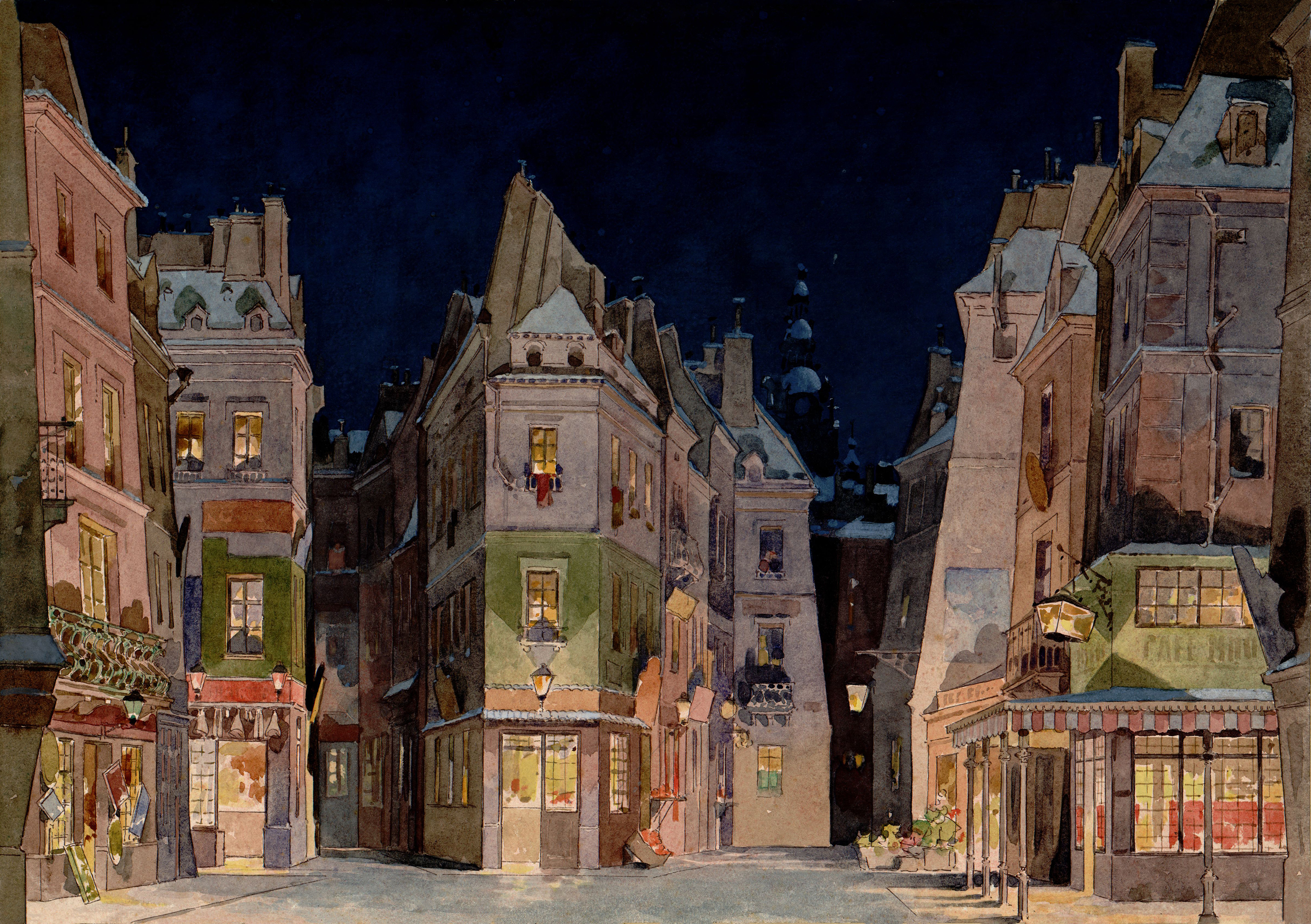
Sketch for the sets of La bohème by Giacomo Puccini (1896).

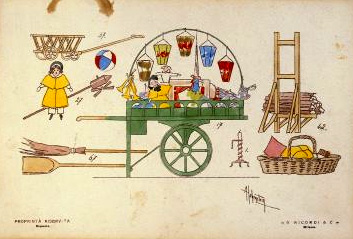
Props for La bohème by Giacomo Puccini (1896).

- Giacomo Puccini, Le Villi, Milan, Teatro Dal Verme, 31 May 1884

2 original sketches
2 scenario props

- Giacomo Puccini, Edgar, Milan, Teatro alla Scala, 21 April 1889

54 original costumes
5 scenario props

- Richard Wagner, Mastersingers of Nuremberg, Milan, Teatro alla Scala, 26 December 1889

62 original costumes
4 set props

- Alfredo Catalani, Loreley, Torino, Teatro Regio, 16 February 1890

42 original costumes

- Alfredo Catalani, La Wally, Milan, Teatro alla Scala, 20 January 1892

4 original sketches
41 original costumes
1 set prop

- Alberto Franchetti, Cristoforo Colombo, Milan, Teatro alla Scala, 26 January 1892

90 figurini originali

- Niccolò van Westerhout, Cimbelino, Rome, Teatro Argentina, 7 April 1892

37 original costumes
3 set props

- Giacomo Puccini, Manon Lescaut, Torino, Teatro Regio, 1893

57 original costumes
4 set props

- Giuseppe Verdi, Falstaff, Milan, Teatro alla Scala, 9 February 1893

5 original sketches
41 original costumes
4 set props
13 watercolor designs

- Giacomo Puccini, La Bohème, Torino, Teatro Regio, 1 February 1896

3 original sketches
62 original costumes
4 set props

- Pietro Mascagni, Iris, Rome, Teatro Costanzi, 22 November 1898

3 original sketches
40 original costumes
9 set props
1 portrait of Mascagni

- Giacomo Puccini, Tosca, Rome, Teatro Costanzi, 14 January 1900

3 original sketches
49 original costumes
4 set props

- Alberto Franchetti, Germania, Milan, Teatro alla Scala, 1 March 1902

4 original sketches
95 original costumes
7 set props

- Franco Alfano, Risurrezione, Torino, Teatro Regio, 1904

2 set props

== Exhibitions ==
- 1894 – Esposizioni Riunite, Milan, Biblioteca Nazionale Braidense
- 1911 – Katalog der Großen Kunstausstellung Düsseldorf (27 May – 8 October), Düsseldorf, Kunstpalast
- 1912 – Katalog der Frühjahrs-Ausstellung (3 March – 14 April), Düsseldorf, Kunstpalast
- 1916 – Kunstchronik, Neue Folge 26, Munich, Zentralinstitut für Kunstgeschichte
- 1917 – Große Berliner Kunstausstellung, Düsseldorf, Kunstpalast (16 June – 30 September): one oil painting, Schwarzwaldküche (Black Forest kitchen)

== See also ==
- Art Nouveau

== Bibliography ==
- Dizionario Enciclopedico Bolaffi dei Pittori e degli Incisori Italiani – dall'XI al XX secolo (volume VI). Giulio Bolaffi Editore, Torino, 1974.
- Un secolo di manifesti. Canova-Alberto Maioli Editore, Milano, 1996. ISBN 88-87843-10-4.
- Edigeo (a cura di). Enciclopedia dell'arte Zanichelli. Zanichelli, Bologna, 2004. ISBN 88-08-22390-6.
- Giorgio Fioravanti. Il dizionario del grafico. Zanichelli, Bologna, 1993. ISBN 88-08-14116-0
