= Marcello Pacifico =

Italian trade unionist (born 1977)

President of ANIEF
- Incumbent
- Assumed office 2003
- Preceded by: -

Personal details
- Born: 28 April 1977 (age 48) Palermo, Italy
- Profession: Trade unionist Teacher

Marcello Pacifico (born 29 April 1977) is an Italian trade unionist, who is serving as President of ANIEF since 2003.

== See also ==
- ANIEF
