= Marcello Dudovich =

Italian painter

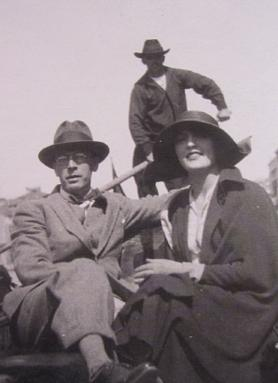
- Dudovich with his wife in Venice (1910)
- Born: 21 March 1878; Trieste
- Died: 31 March 1962 (aged 84); Milan
- Known for: Painting, Illustration, Poster art
- Movement: Art Nouveau, called Stile Liberty in Italy

Signature
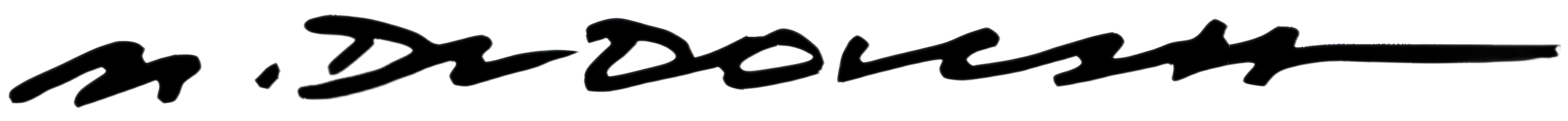

Marcello Dudovich (21 March 1878 – 31 March 1962) was an Italian painter, illustrator, and poster designer. Together with Leonetto Cappiello, Adolfo Hohenstein, Giovanni Maria Mataloni and Leopoldo Metlicovitz, he is considered one of the progenitors of Italian poster design.

== Biography ==
Marcello Dudovich was born in 1878 in Trieste to an Italian mother and a Dalmatian father. His father, Antonio Dudovich, born in Traù (Trogir), Dalmatia, was a fervent Italian irredentist who fought alongside Giuseppe Garibaldi during the Third Italian War of Independence, and worked for the insurance company Assicurazioni Generali. Marcello attended the prestigious Royal School in Trieste. Upon completing his studies, he began working with his father as a lithographer and illustrator for advertising art, prints and posters.

He relocated from Trieste to Milan in 1897 after attending a professional art school. He was recruited as a lithographer by Ricordi, a music publisher, thanks to his father's friendship with the illustrator and cartoonist Leopoldo Metlicovitz, and was given charge of advertisement design.

In 1899, he transferred to Bologna, working here for the publisher Edmondo Chappuis, designing billboards, book covers and illustrations for publications such as Italia Ride in 1900 and Fantasio in 1902. Here he met Elisa Bucchi, his future wife.

In 1900, he won the "Gold Medal" at the Paris World Fair.

In 1905, Dudovich returned to Milan to rejoin Ricordi. Here, in the next few years, he designed some of his well-known posters, including a series of famous advertising posters for the department store Grandi Magazzini Mele in Naples and "Borsalino". In the 1920s, he made several posters for the Milan department store, La Rinascente, and in 1922, he was appointed artistic director of "Igap".

In 1930, he designed a prominent poster for Pirelli. After the Second World War he moved away from the world of commercial art, concentrating instead on his painting.

Marcello Dudovich died in Milan from a cerebral haemorrhage on 31 March 1962.

Dudovich is celebrated as one of Italy's greatest poster artists. He was inspired by Edward Penfield, by his friend and teacher Adolfo Hohenstein and by Alphonse Mucha.

== Selected lithographs ==
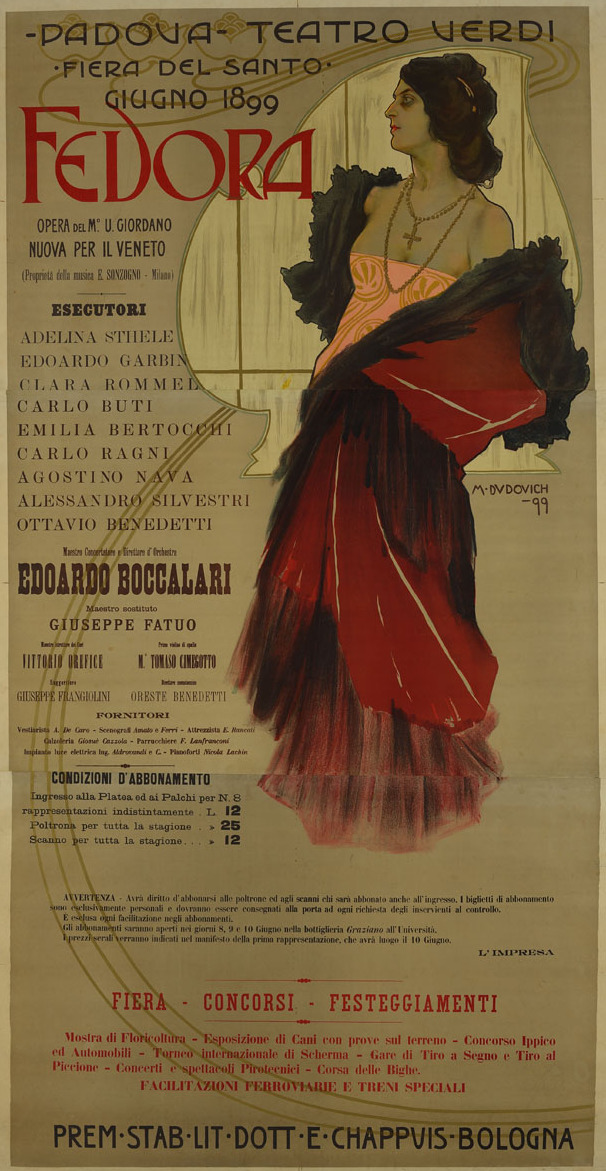
Poster for the Umberto Giordano opera "Fedora," 1899.

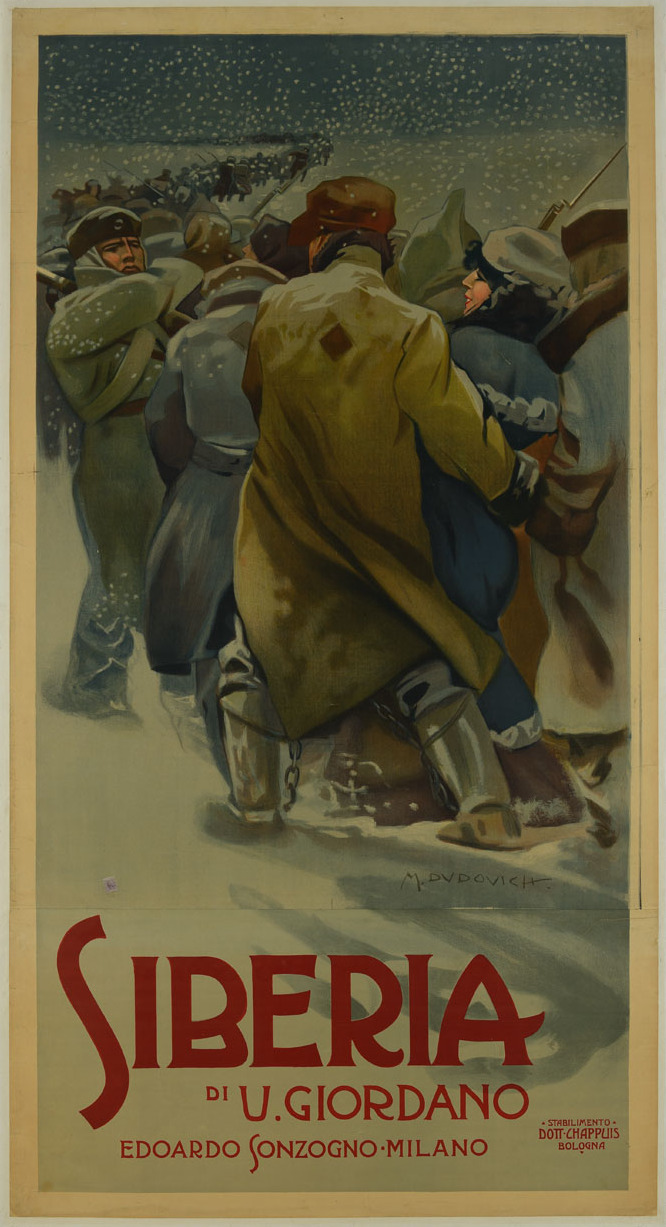
Poster for the premiere of "Siberia" the opera by Giordano, 1903.

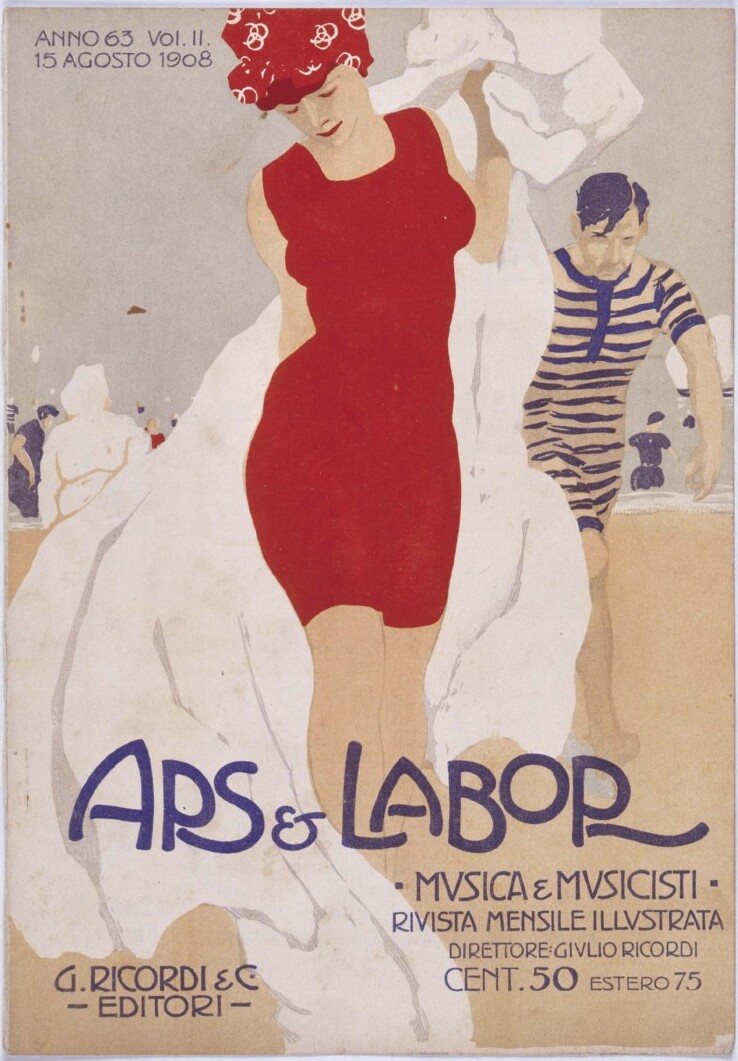
Illustration for the cover of "Ars et Labor" (Art and Labor) magazine, 1908.

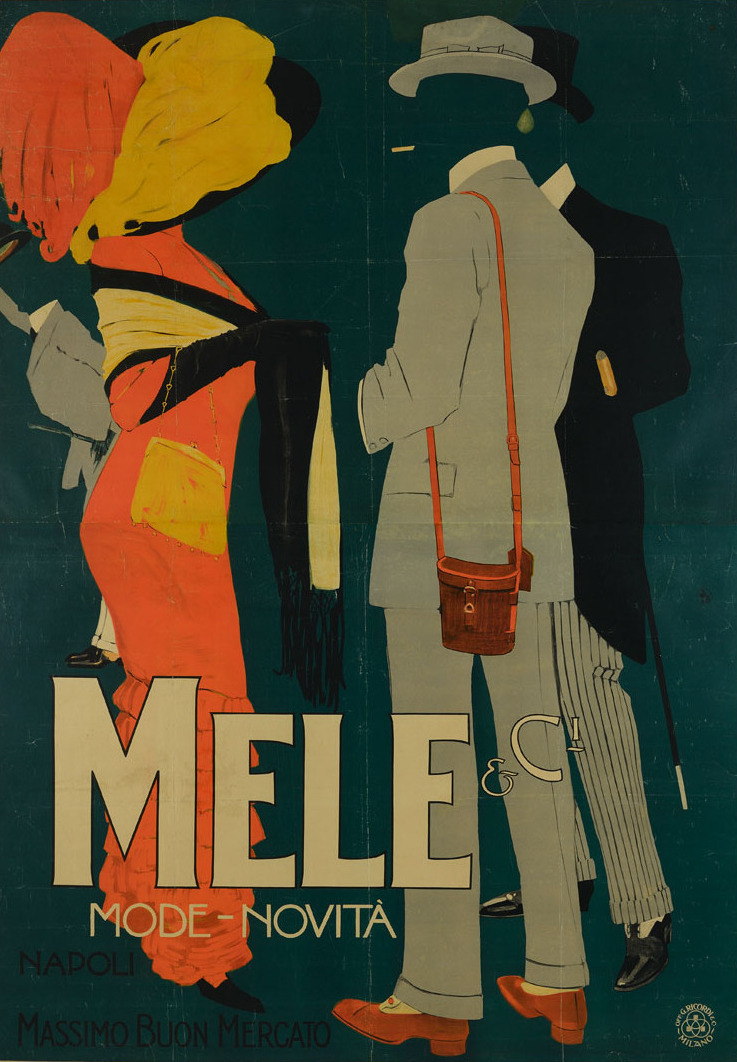
Advertising poster for the Grandi Magazzini Mele, 1910.

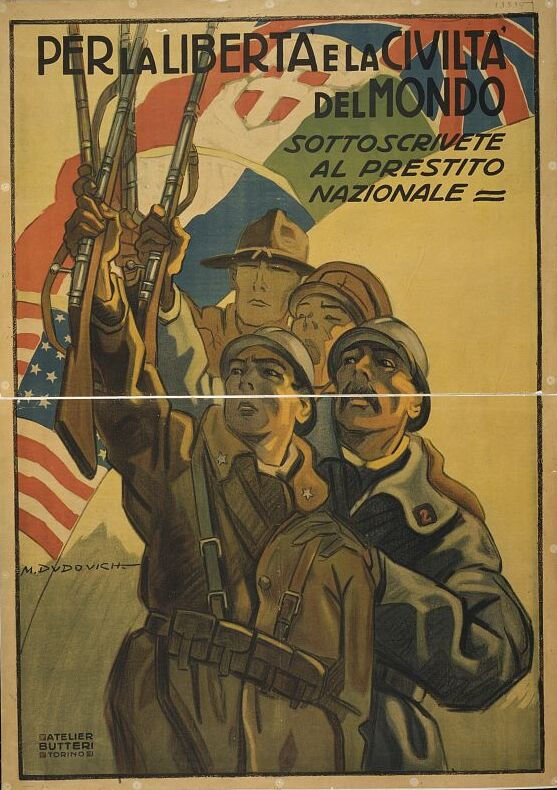
WWI recruitment poster, seeking to inspire enlistment by touting freedom and civilization (la libertá e la civiltá), 1917.

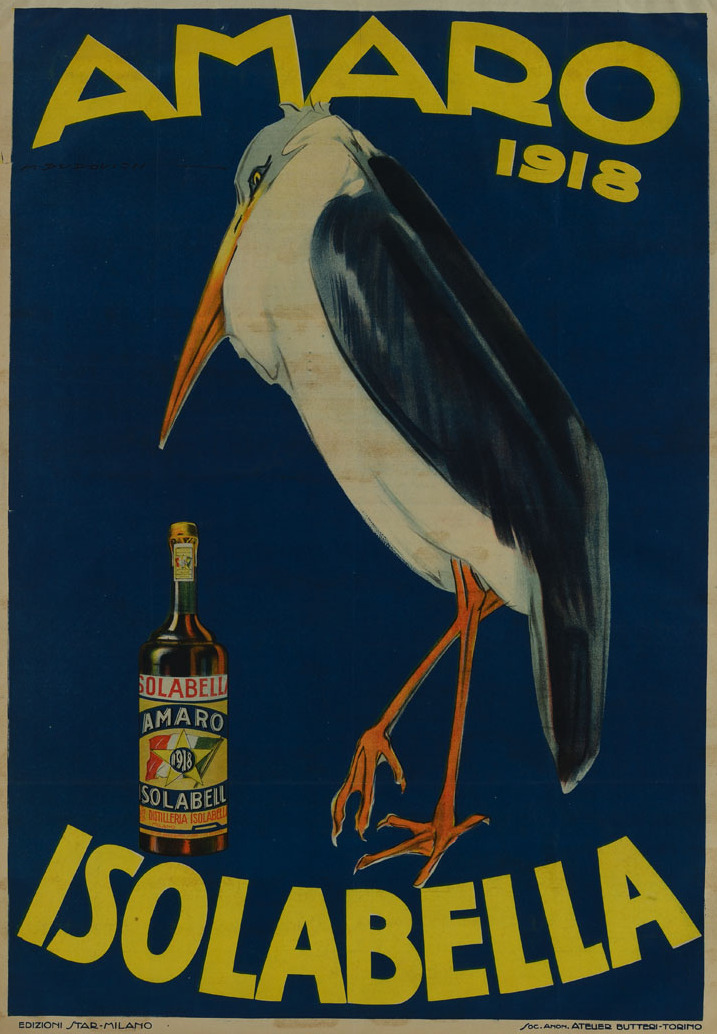
Advertising poster for Amaro Isolabella, 1918.

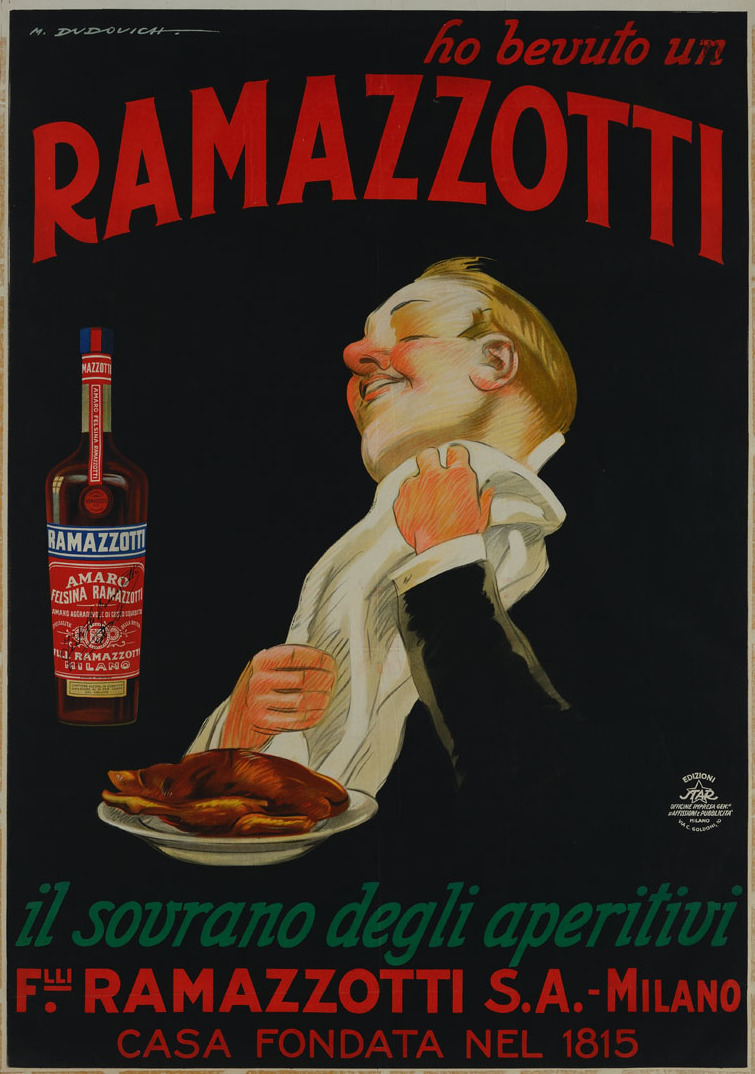
Advertising poster for Ramazzotti, 1920.

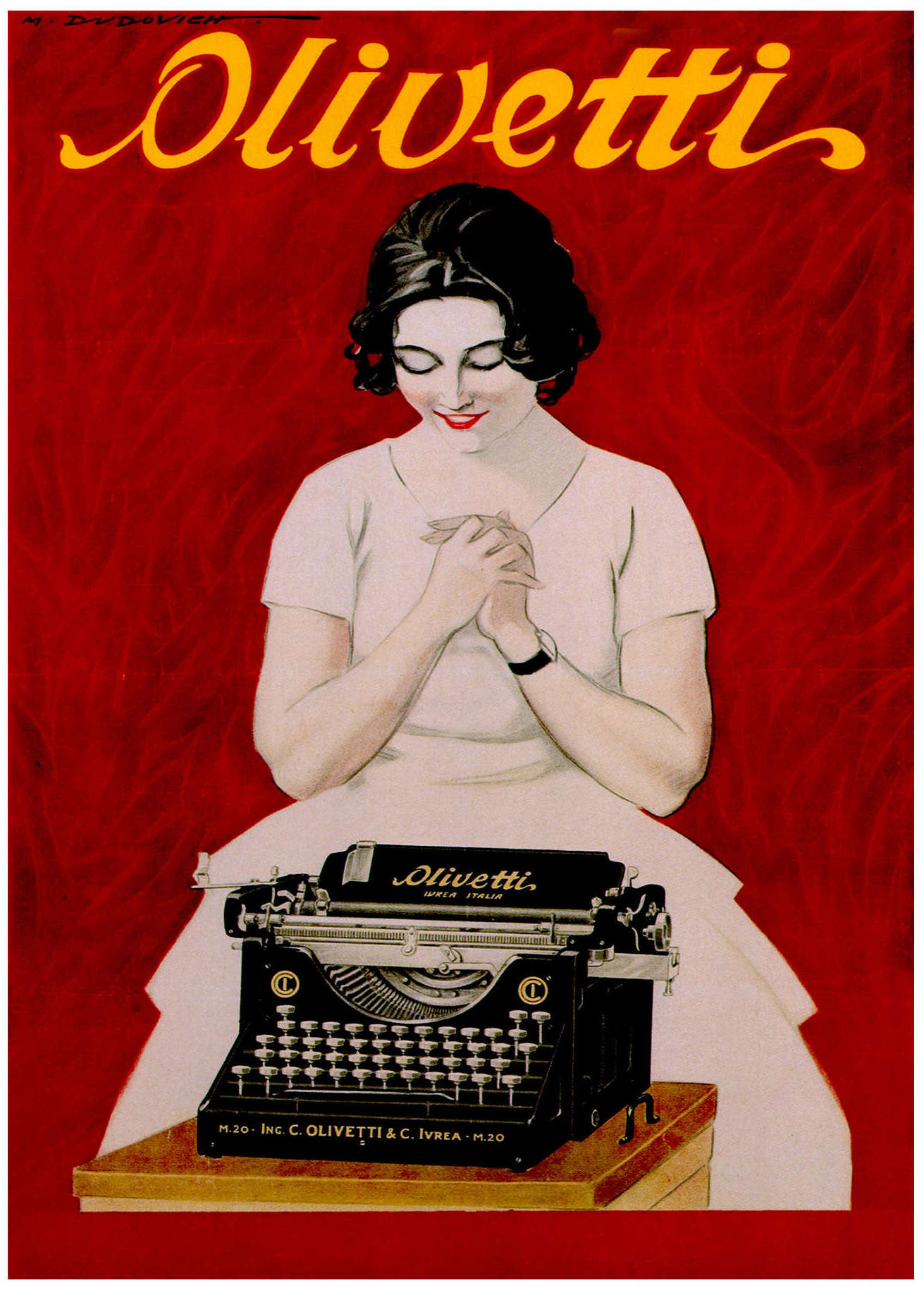
Advertising poster for Olivetti, 1920.

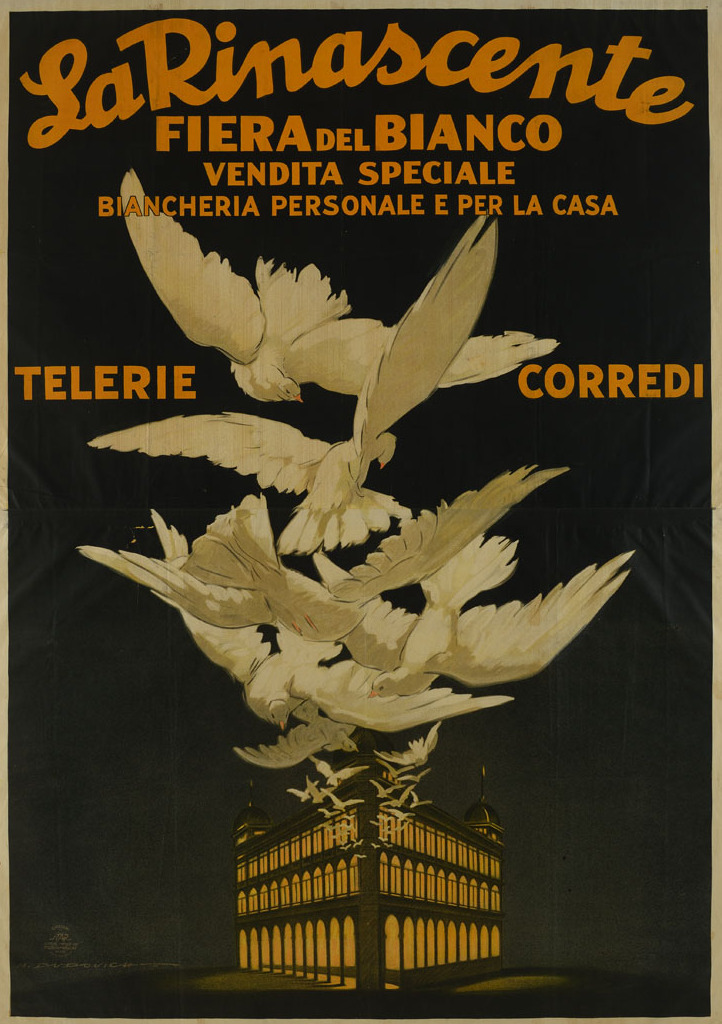
Advertising poster for La Rinascente, 1921.

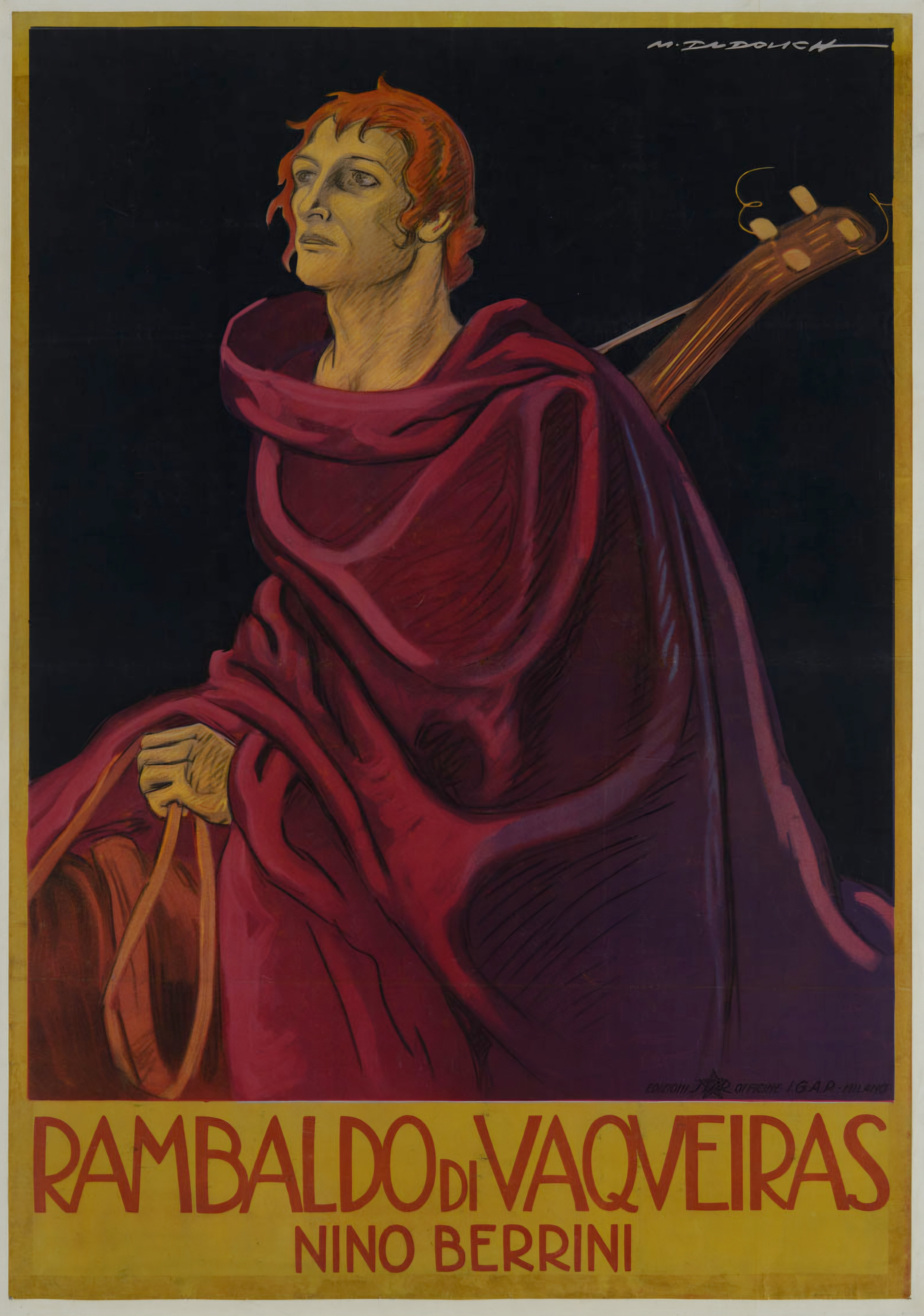
Poster for the premiere of Nino Berrini's Rambaldo di Vaqueiras, 1922.

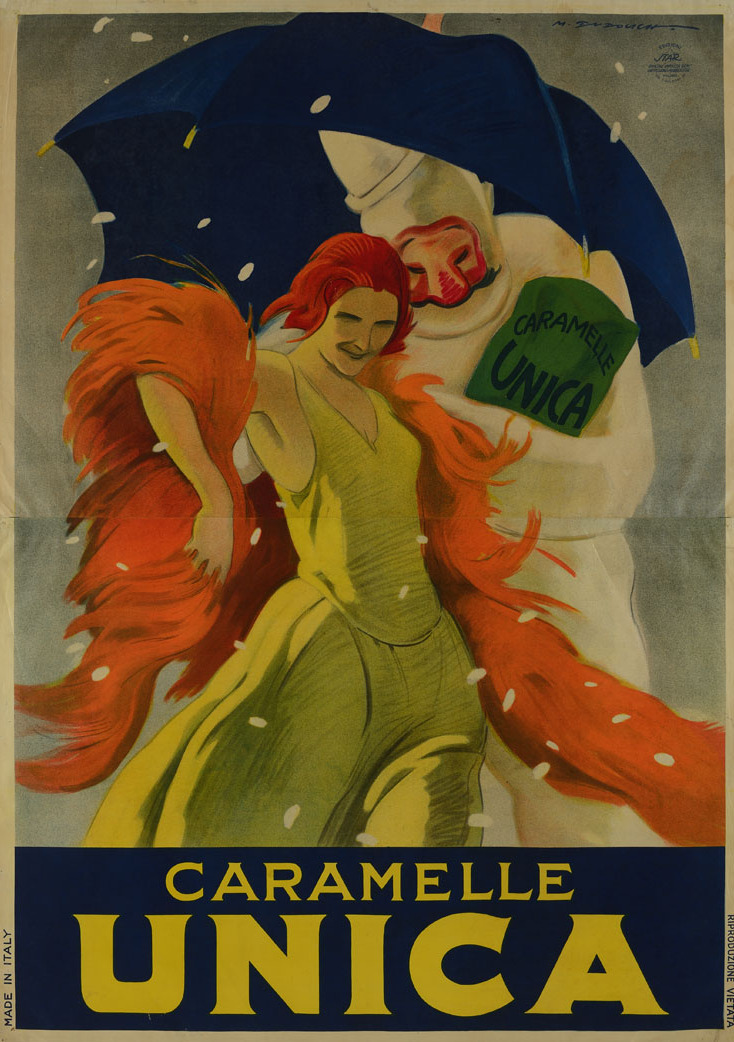
Advertising poster for Caramelle Unica, 1924.

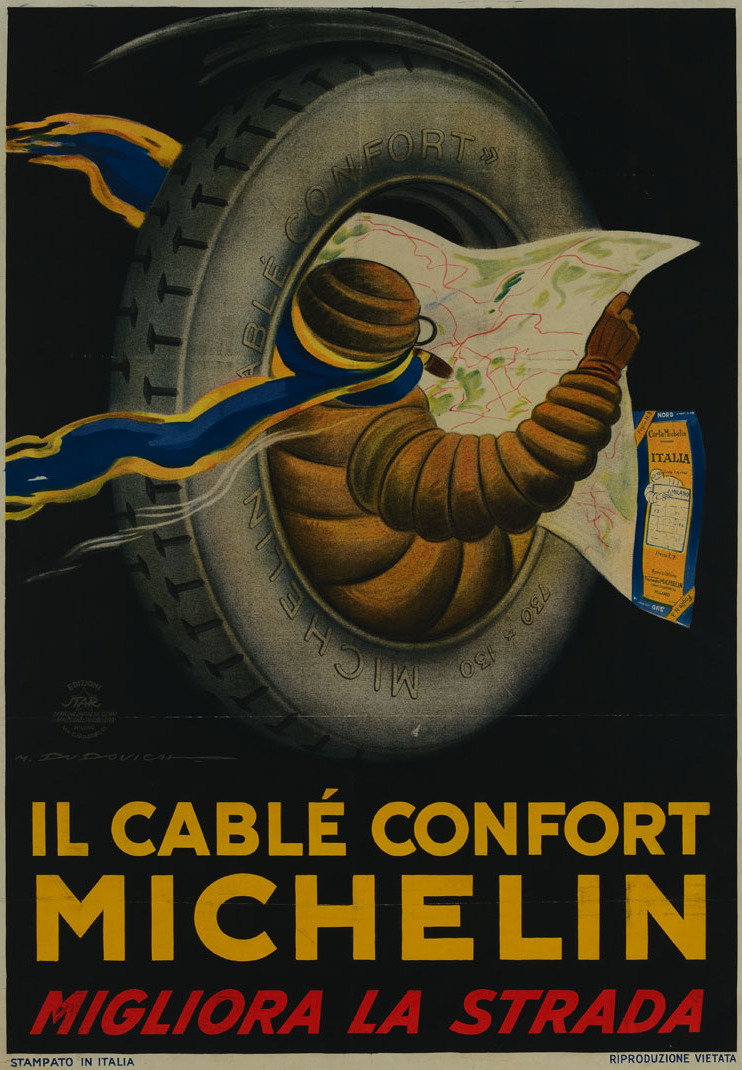
Advertising poster for Michelin, 1925.

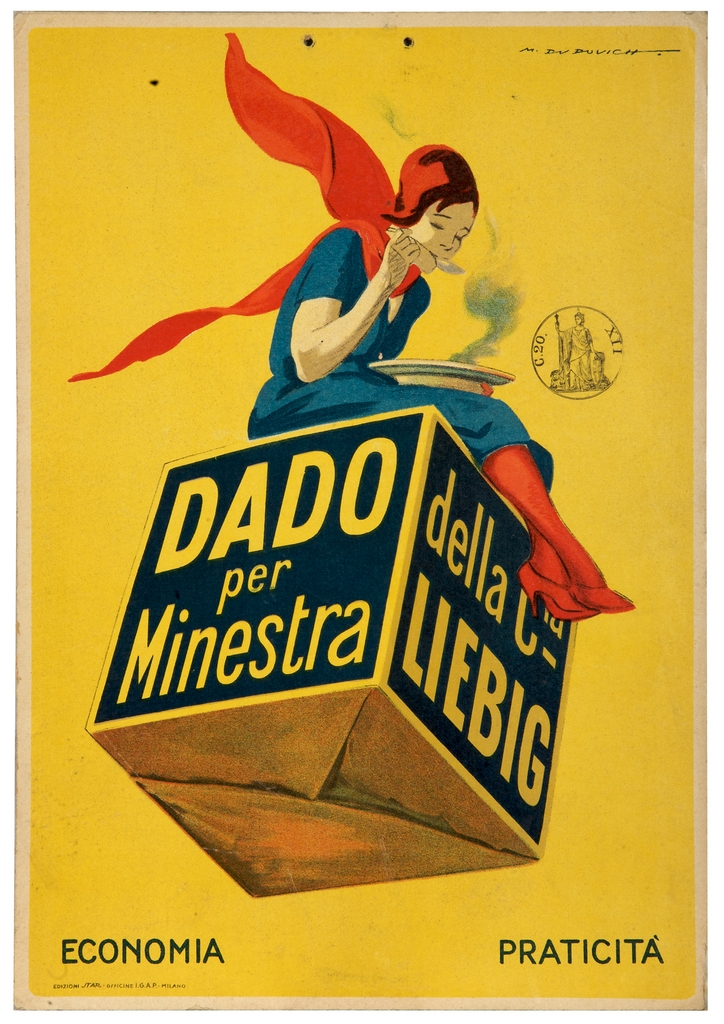
Advertising poster for Liebig's Extract of Meat Company, 1927.

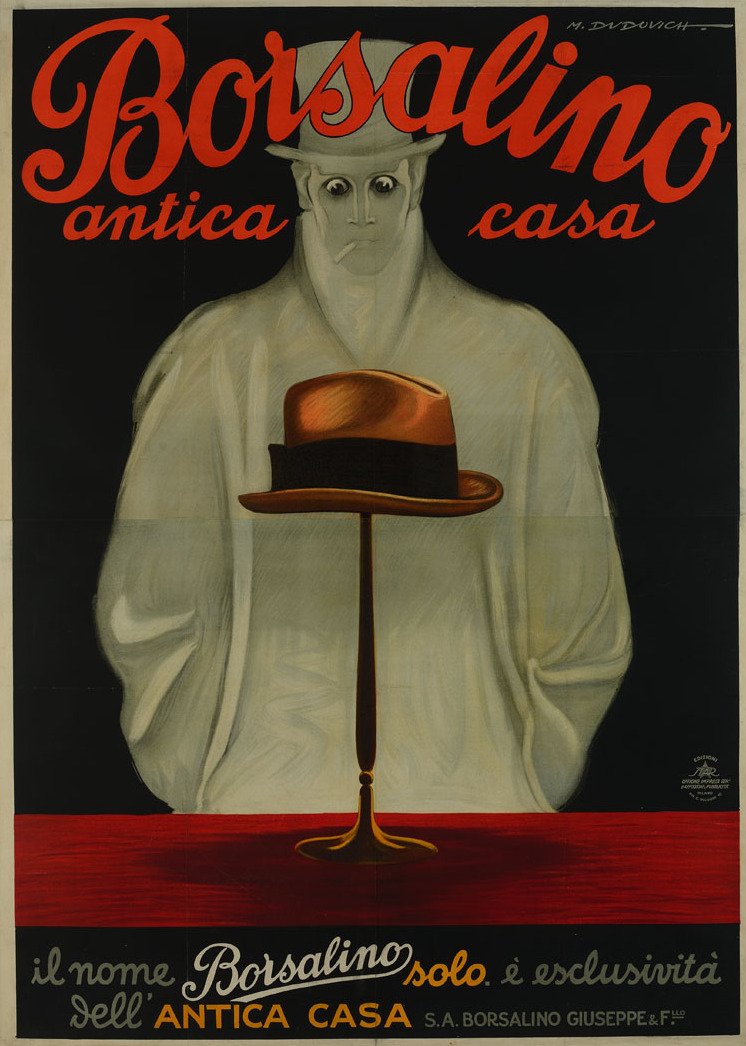
Advertising poster for Borsalino, 1928.

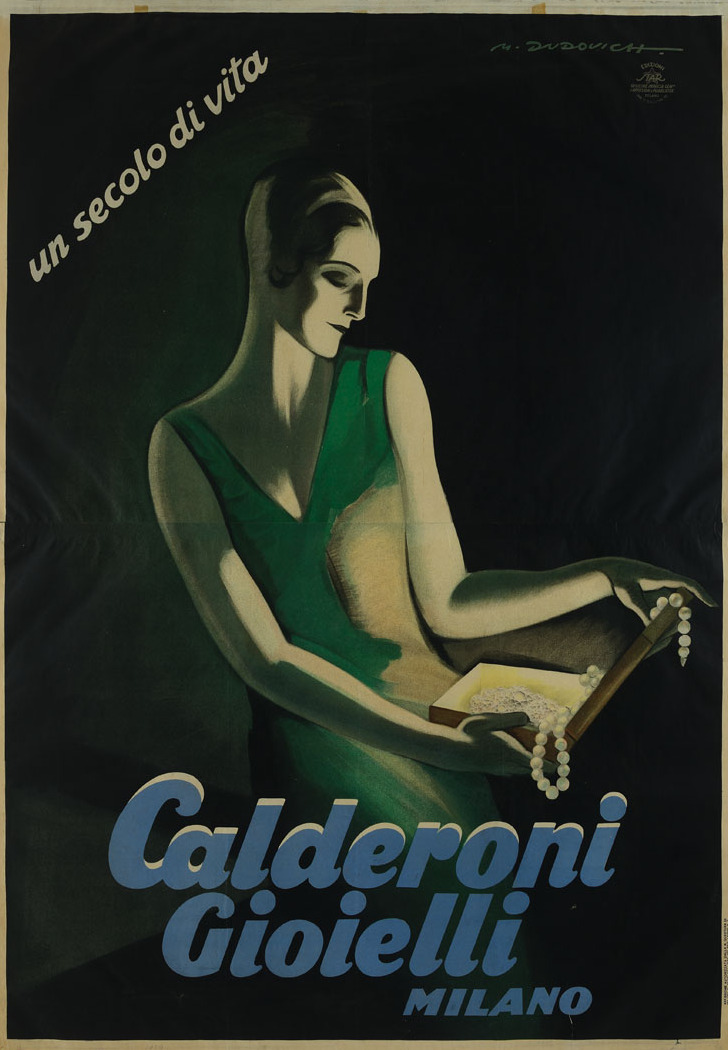
Advertising poster for Calderoni Gioielli, 1928.

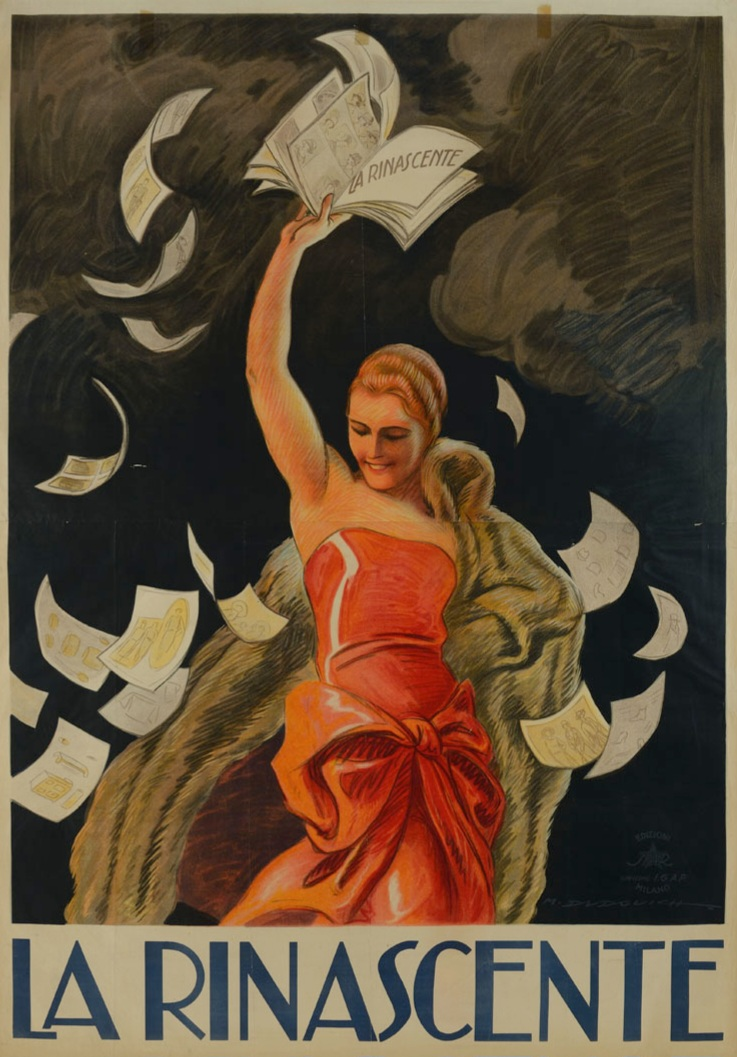
Advertising poster for La Rinascente, 1929.

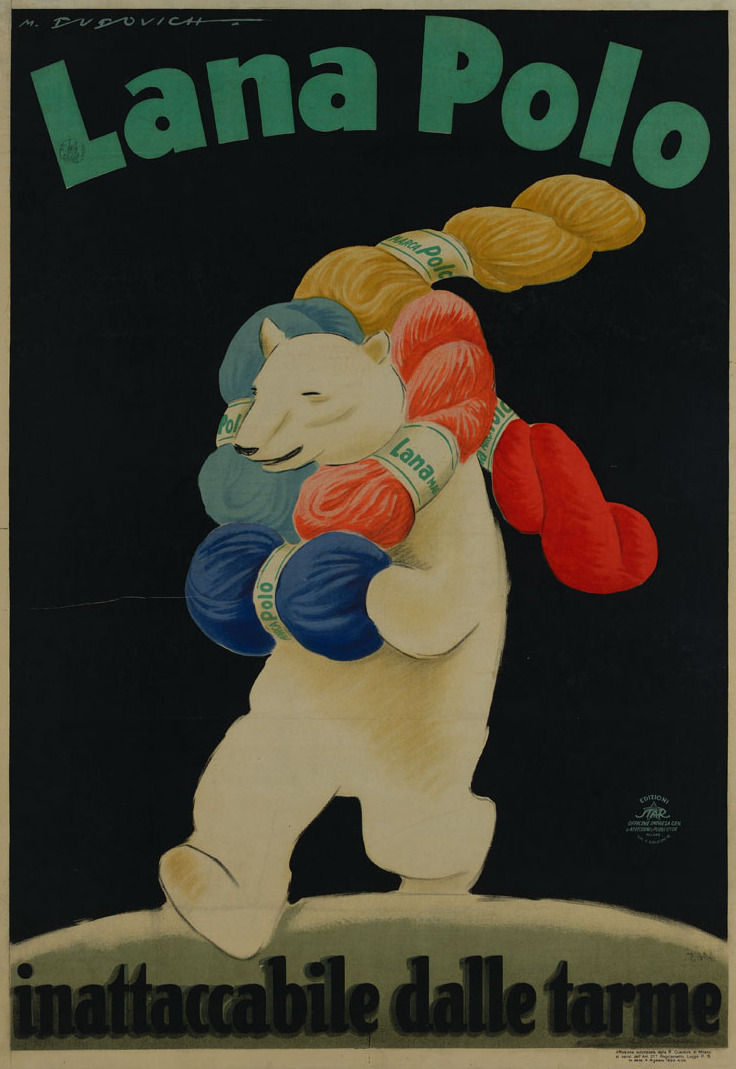
Advertising poster for Lana Polo, 1930.

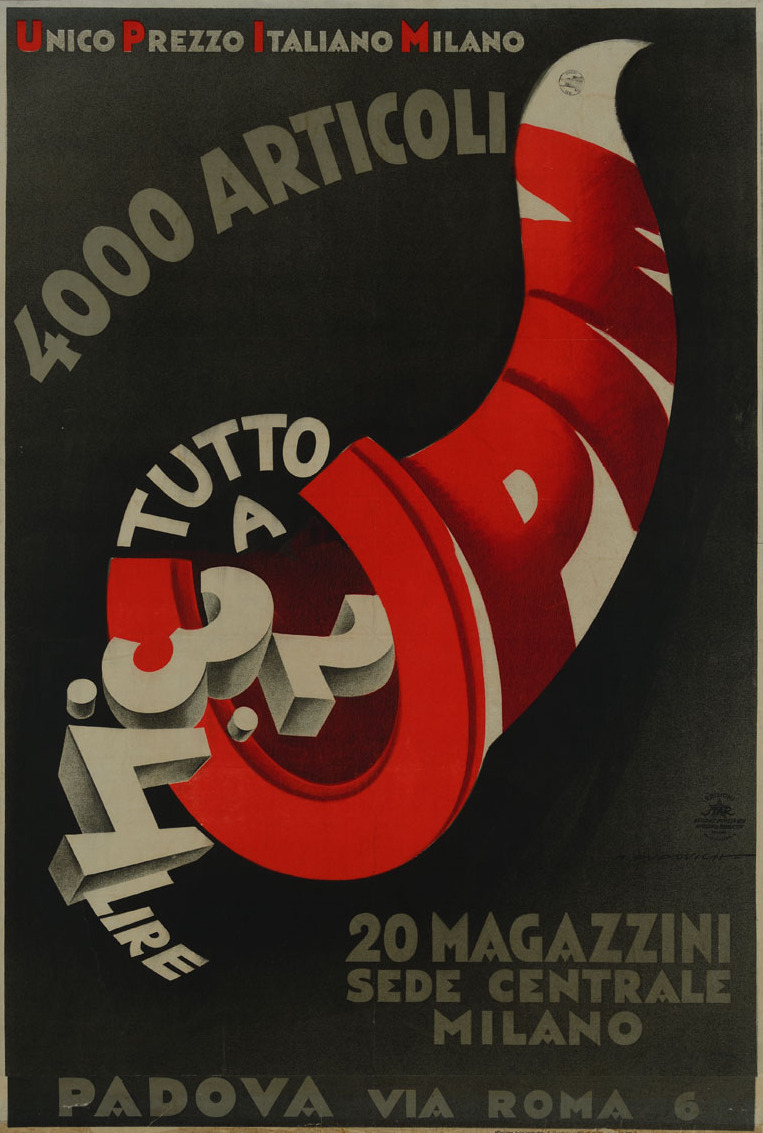
Advertising poster for UPIM, 1930.

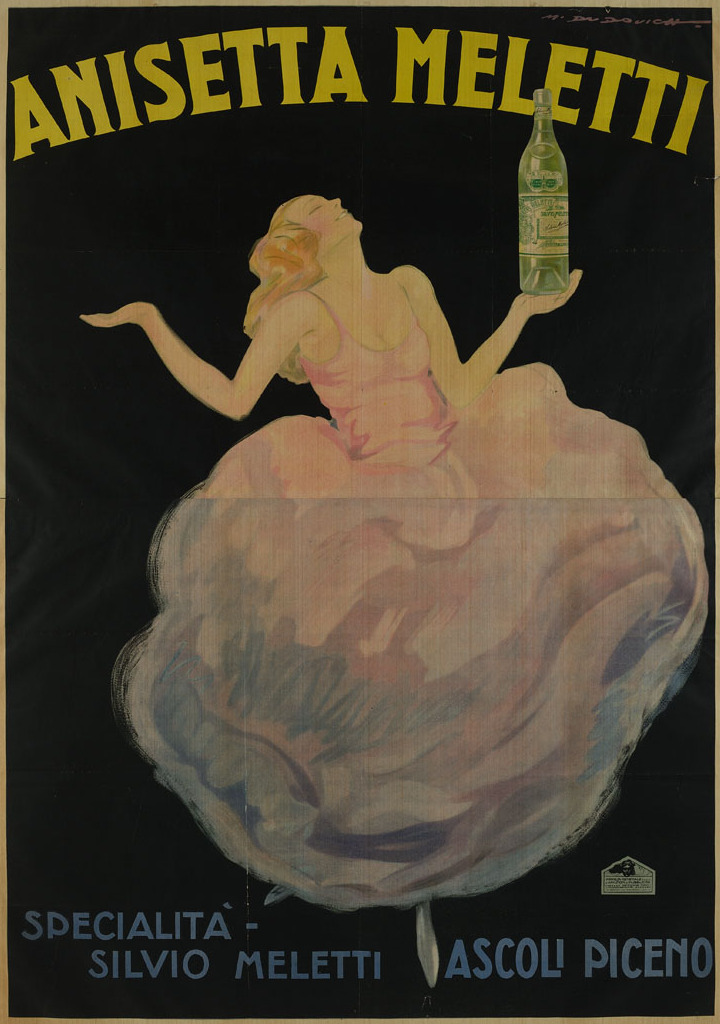
Advertising poster for Anisette Meletti, 1930

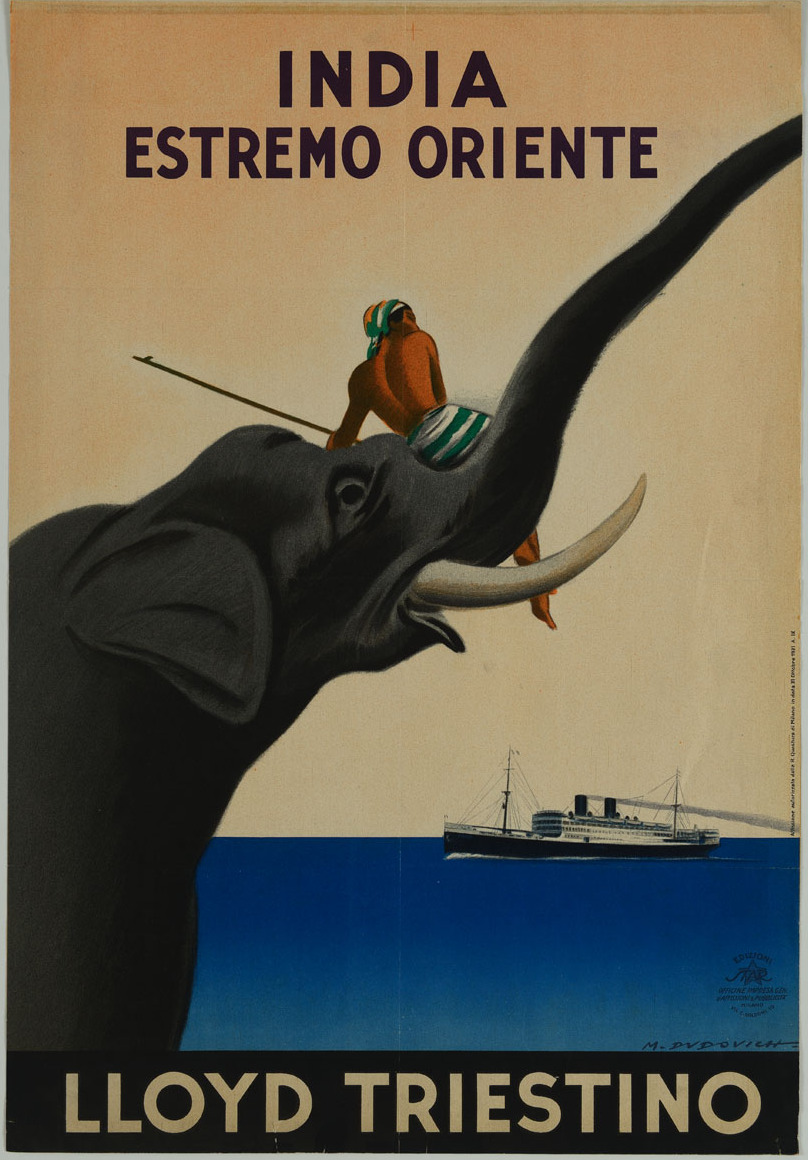
Advertising poster for Lloyd Triestino, 1931.
