= San Marcello =

San Marcello may refer to:

- San Marcello Pistoiese, a frazione of the comune of San Marcello Piteglio in the Italian province of Pistoia
- San Marcello (Ancona), a comune in the Italian province of Ancona
- Poggio San Marcello, a comune, also in the province of Ancona
- San Marcello al Corso, a church in Rome
- 7481 San Marcello, an asteroid

== See also ==
- Pope Marcellus I, also known as Saint Marcellus I or San Marcello
