= Fulton Umbrellas =

British umbrella manufacturer

Coordinates: 51.5369°N 0.2731°W

- Industry: Retailer; Manufacturer
- Founded: 1956
- Founder: Arnold Fulton
- Headquarters: London, England
- Area served: United Kingdom
- Key people: Nigel Fulton
- Products: Umbrella

Fulton Umbrellas is the United Kingdom's largest manufacturer of umbrellas, used by various members of the British Royal Family.

== History ==
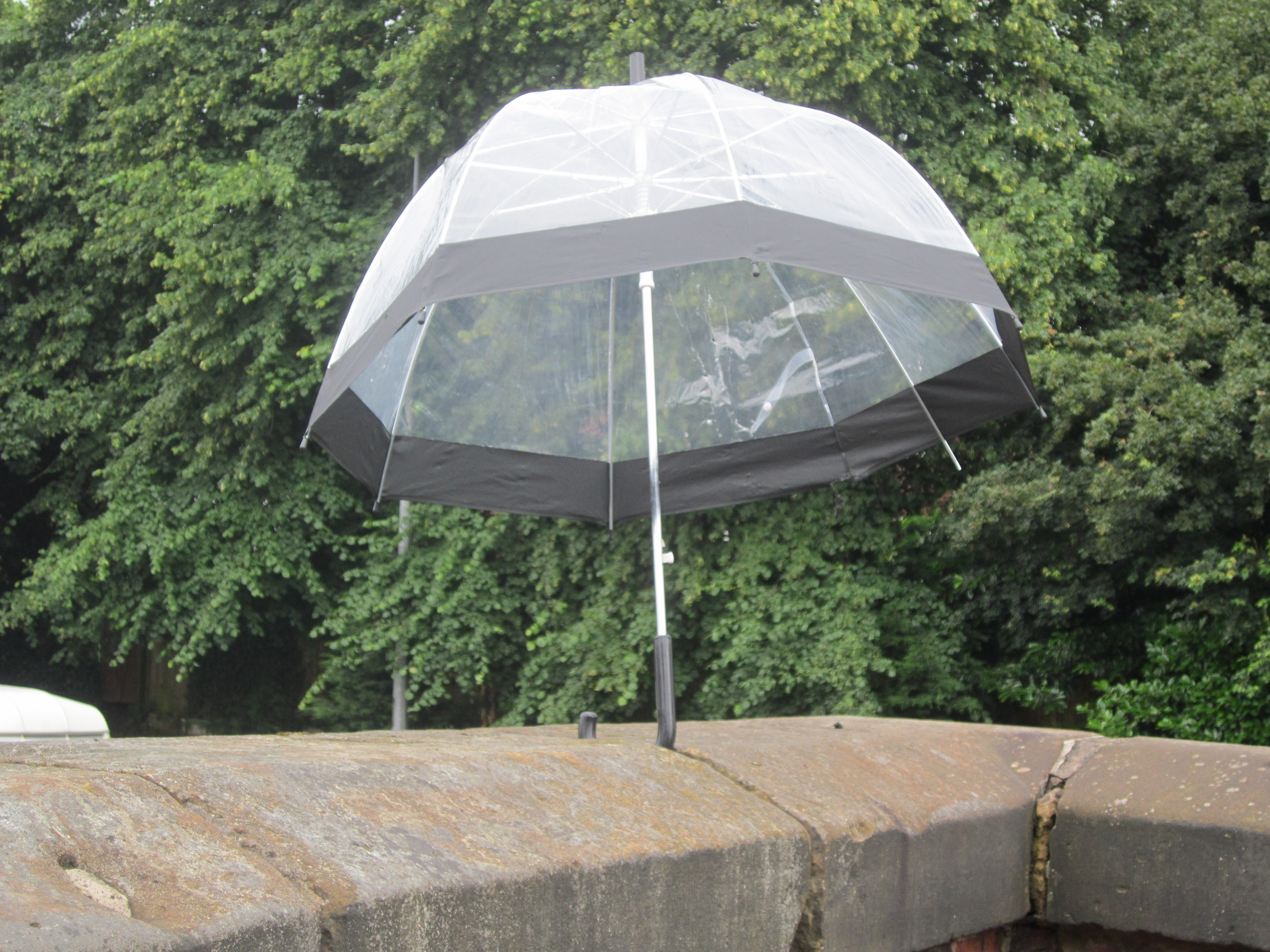
The "birdcage" transparent umbrella invented by Arnold Fulton

The company was founded in 1956 in London, England by Arnold Fulton, an engineer and inventor, who was born in Poland and survived the Warsaw Ghetto, whose sister and brother-in-law ran an umbrella factory in Stockholm. He died in 2022 aged 91.

As of 2006, they were the UK's leading manufacturer with a 35% market share, producing four million a year, and £30 million in annual retail sales.

Fulton had a Royal Warrant from Queen Elizabeth the Queen Mother, and in 2008 were granted one by the Queen. The company is now run by the founder's son, Nigel Fulton.

== See also ==
- Boutique Bétaille
- Thomas Brigg & Sons
- James Smith & Sons
- Swaine London
