= Papworth Industries =

Manufacturing arm of Papworth Village Settlement

- Type: Company limited by guarantee
- Industry: Manufacturing
- Founded: 1916 in Bourn, Cambridgeshire, England
- Founder: Pendrill Charles Varrier-Jones (1883–1941)
- Fate: Luggage and travel-goods division bought by Swaine Adeney Brigg in 1997
- Successor: Papworth Trust; Swaine Adeney Brigg (luggage and travel goods division)
- Headquarters: Papworth Everard, Cambridgeshire, United Kingdom
- Products: cabinetry, luggage, travel goods, books, coachwork, electronics

Papworth Industries was the name given to the manufacturing arm of Papworth Village Settlement, a Cambridgeshire colony for sufferers of tuberculosis founded in 1916. The luggage and travel-goods division was bought by the London firm of Swaine Adeney Brigg in 1997.

== History ==
During the First World War, the Welsh physician Dr Pendrill Varrier-Jones was appointed temporary county tuberculosis officer for Cambridgeshire. He set about establishing a self-supporting colony where TB sufferers could learn to live with their disease under medical supervision and do a level of work that did not worsen their condition, and be paid for doing so.

What began in February 1916 at a house in Bourn as the Cambridgeshire Tuberculosis Colony with six patients soon won official backing. Then, with the support of almost £10,000 in donations, the colony was able to acquire Papworth Hall at Papworth Everard, some five miles away and move there in February 1918. By the time of Queen Mary's visit, the first of many royal visits, on 9 October 1918, there were 25 wooden shelters for the more stable patients, 60 beds in the hall itself for the seriously ill, 8 cottages for patients' wives and children and facilities for five separate industries: a carpentry and cabinet-making workshop; a boot-repair shop; a poultry farm, a fruit farm and a piggery. Patients whose health was improving were assigned paid work under medical supervision and the goods manufactured were sold at commercial rates on the open market. In 1919 further industrial facilities were added, among them: a printing shop; a bookbindery; and a trunk-making workshop, this latter the origin of Pendragon Travel Goods.

"In 1930 there were 200 men and 80 women patients," wrote Rowland Parker; "294 on average were in daily employment; the Industries had an annual turnover of £68,000." The development of the colony was nevertheless costing far more than the Industries could make. In an appeal on the wireless in 1932, Stanley Baldwin said of Varrier-Jones: "For years he has struggled on, entirely without endowments, harassed by the conflicting claims of finance and humanity. His humanity has won, but his overdraft is enormous."

On 17 December 1935 at the royal premiere at the Leicester Square Theatre, London of René Clair's The Ghost Goes West before Queen Mary, the whole of the proceeds was devoted to the provision of a nurses' home at Papworth. A short film by Anthony Asquith, The Story of Papworth, the Village of Hope had its premiere at the same performance.

During the Second World War, the carpentry section of the Industries switched mainly to the making of aircraft parts.

The Disabled Persons (Employment) Act of 1944 and the National Health Service Act that came into effect in 1948 helped eliminate the spread of TB and other diseases by removing economic pressure.

After a visit in 1947, the British Medical Association reported that Papworth then had hospital and sanatorium accommodation for 350 men and women TB patients and that the Industries, staffed and managed by ex-patients, turned over £340,0000 per annum, with some 410 people employed daily.

On 5 July 1948, the hospitals and surgical units at Papworth were brought under state control as part of the newly founded National Health Service.

As tuberculosis retreated, Papworth looked to help those disabled by other diseases. A pilot scheme was launched in 1957 to extend Papworth to benefit non-TB disabled. Training schemes were set up.

The poultry farm closed down in 1959 and the pig farm in 1961 because they were "non-payers". New "sheltered" workshops were set up, the first in 1961, under a new trading company called Everard Industries.

Combined turnover for the Industries in 1974 was £1.75m, with a surplus of £137,000.

When Papworth's governors decided to focus on providing people with disabilities the skills for living and working in the wider world, away from the protecting surroundings of the settlement, Papworth Industries were sold off as so many going concerns.

Papworth Trust, a charity offering housing and training to the disabled, is the successor to Papworth Industries and Papworth Hospital to the hospital first established by Varrier-Jones as part of his village settlement.

== Output highlights ==
=== Trunk-making division ===
James Alexander Box, saddler to the Royal Field Artillery, was diagnosed with tuberculosis in 1918 and declared unfit for service. Sent to Papworth, he set about putting his leatherworking skills to good use and was the driving force behind the creation of the trunk and portmanteau workshop set up at the settlement in 1919.

With the unpredictability of the Papworth labour force, Box suggested that Papworth should form an alliance with his wife's family, the Charnocks, owners of a bag-making firm in London. The initial agreement made was that the Charnocks should finish off orders that Papworth was struggling to meet. Varrier-Jones took the idea a stage further and persuaded the Charnocks to shift their business to Papworth. The father wound up the London operation and the three sons spent the rest of their working lives at Papworth, each in turn running the trunk-making business.

Following a devastating fire in 1925, Papworth Industries opened a new well-equipped trunk-making factory in 1926 that was able to produce a wide range of goods from utility fibre suitcases to handcrafted attaché cases, from canvas kit bags to vulcanized fibre cabin trunks. A reputation far and wide was soon established and the buyer from Saks Fifth Avenue is recorded as coming in person to select items for the prestigious New York store.

By 1937 output had reached thirty thousand pieces of luggage a year and the new factory was bursting at the seams. A brand new factory was completed a month before the outbreak of the Second World War and was well placed to switch production to meeting wartime needs, ranging from attaché cases for the Admiralty to canvas covers for Spitfire, Halifax and Stirling aircraft. In mid-1940 just after the evacuation from Dunkirk, Papworth Industries won a contract to produce 30,000 sets of leather personal equipment for infantrymen. The order, dubbed the Dunkirk Order, was deemed to be the crowning achievement of the department by Sidney Charnock.

After the war production methods changed considerably, driven by shortages and changing requirements. The growth of air travel brought with it the need for sturdy but lightweight luggage and new materials were utilized, including plastic and vinyl. There was still a clientele, however, for traditionally made high-quality leatherwork, and skills in that area were maintained.

A travelling wardrobe and matching travelling case were made for Princess Margaret on the occasion of the royal family's tour of South Africa in 1947.

In the early 1950s, the ballerina Margot Fonteyn was one of the first customers to buy a set of luggage with aluminium and plywood frame hidden from view beneath the full-grain hide exterior and the moiré silk lining.

The travel goods business and Pendragon brand name were acquired by Swaine Adeney Brigg in 1997. The original workforce was retained but manufacturing moved to Bar Hill. The name Pendragon was dropped in favour of Papworth Travel Goods, still the brand name for a range of luggage and leather goods made by Swaine Adeney Brigg.

=== Carpentry ===
In 1931 Papworth Industries built a wooden Roman Catholic chapel dedicated to St Francis of Assisi in Papworth. It became a church hall after a new brick church was built next to it in 1954.

=== Coach-building ===
The coach-building workshop was established in 1962 and won contracts to build the yellow Post Office vans and the Green Goddess fire engines. However, in the immediate post-war period, between 1947 and 1949, Frank Jordon, who had been head coach-builder for the London General Omnibus Company, and became head of carpentry at Papworth Industries, secured for Papworth Industries orders to build 500 shooting brake bodies on the Austin 16 chassis. Later, 900 A70 Hampshire Countyman woodies were built by Papworth Industries followed by more than 1,500 A70 Hereford Countryman woodies. The business later became ATT Papworth and by 2008 Papworth Specialist Vehicles trading from Stirling Way, Papworth. They went into liquidation in 2013. The premises are now those of Supply Plus Ltd, a company which designs, manufactures, supplies and distributes safety and fuel delivery equipment.

== Branding ==
Varrier-Jones was affectionately known among his patients as Pendragon, reflecting both his first name Pendrill and his strength of character. The nickname, first given to him as a child, was adopted as a brand name by Papworth Industries: Pendragon Press for the printing works and Pendragon Travel Goods for trunks and other luggage items. A heraldic dragon grasping a quill pen was sometimes used as a trade-mark.

== Warrants of appointment and awards ==
- 1924 Trunk and cabinet-makers to George V
- 1931 Trunk and cabinet-makers to Edward, Prince of Wales
- Trunk and cabinet-makers to George VI
- 1972 Travel goods maker to Elizabeth II
- 1983 Design Council award for Papworth's Yuki travel goods
