= Boutique Bétaille =

French umbrella manufacturer

Bétaille was a luxury umbrella manufacturer in Paris. The boutique was located at rue Royale 5 from 1880 to 1939. The goodwill and stock of the firm were bought out by Thomas Brigg & Sons in 1919.

Their products included wedding baskets, presents, walking sticks and riding whips. The main focus lay however in the production and sale of umbrellas for the upper end. Paris at that time was one of the centres of the production of umbrellas.

Customers included royal courts of Europe and the international upper classes. Umbrellas by Bétaille are included in the collection of the Metropolitan Museum of Art and are also sold on auctions.

== See also ==
- Revel (brand)
- James Smith & Sons
- Swaine London
- Thomas Brigg & Sons
