= Anthony Eden hat =

Type of headgear popularised in Britain

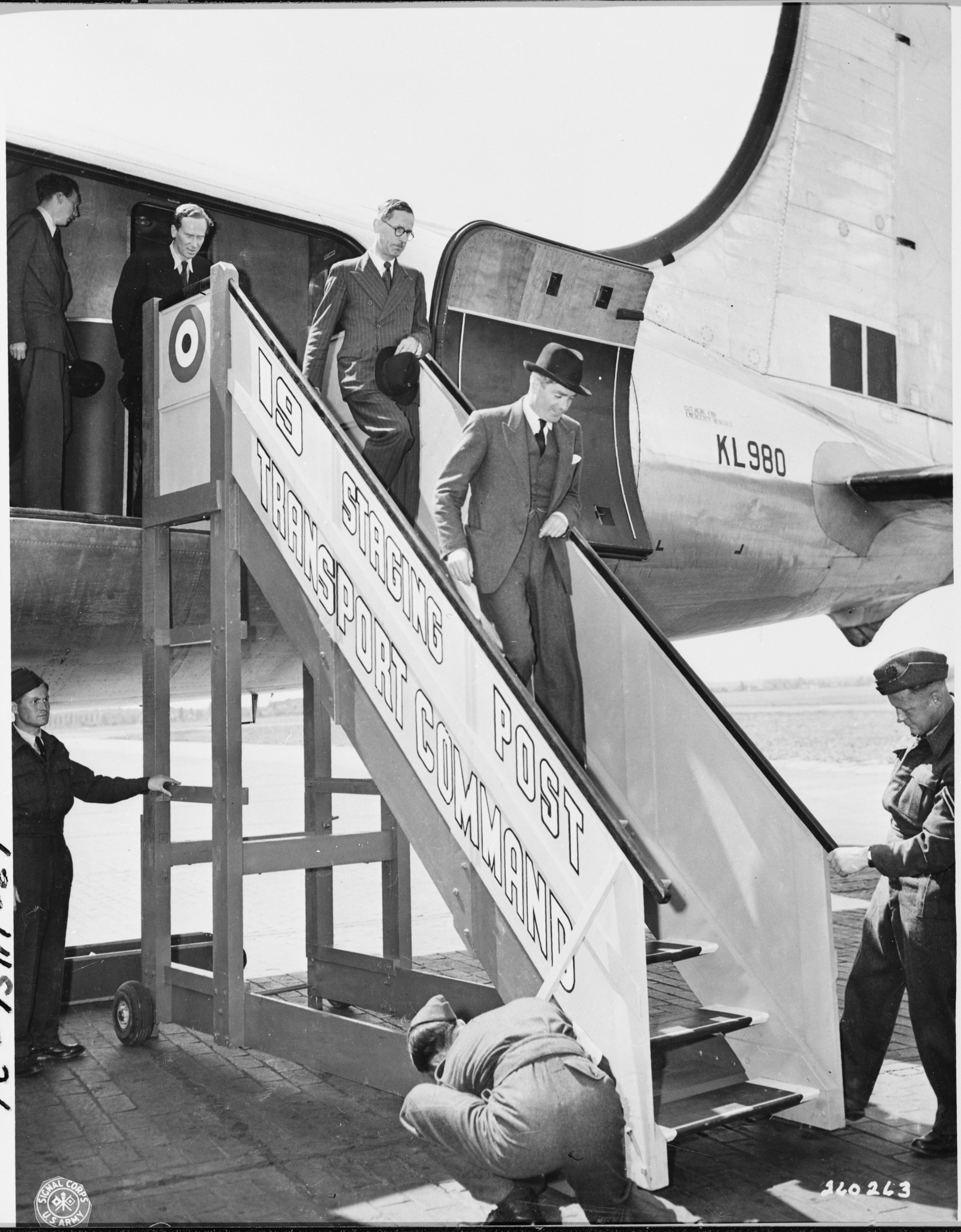
British Foreign Minister Anthony Eden, wearing his trademark hat, arriving at Gatow Airport on 15 July 1945 to attend the Potsdam Conference

An "Anthony Eden" hat, or simply an "Anthony Eden", was a type of headgear popularised in Britain in the mid-20th century by politician Anthony Eden. Eden, who was known for his sartorial elegance, favoured a silk-brimmed, black felt homburg at a time when most Britons preferred the trilby or the bowler. Eden held a number of cabinet posts in the 1930s and the 1940s, and was Prime Minister from 1955 to 1957.

The hat became so associated with him that it was commonly known in the UK as the "Anthony Eden" (or, in London's Savile Row, simply as the "Eden"). It was not marketed as such and the name was purely informal, but the use of the term was widespread, entering dictionaries and phrase books: for example, it was still listed in the 17th edition of Brewer in 2005 and as recently as 2010 the fashion "guru" Trinny Woodall cited the hat as an example of Eden's reputation for being well dressed. It came into particular vogue among civil servants and diplomats in Whitehall and, to that extent, rather belied the stereotypical view, that lasted until well after the Second World War, of civil servants as a "bowler hat" brigade.

== The trilby and the homburg ==
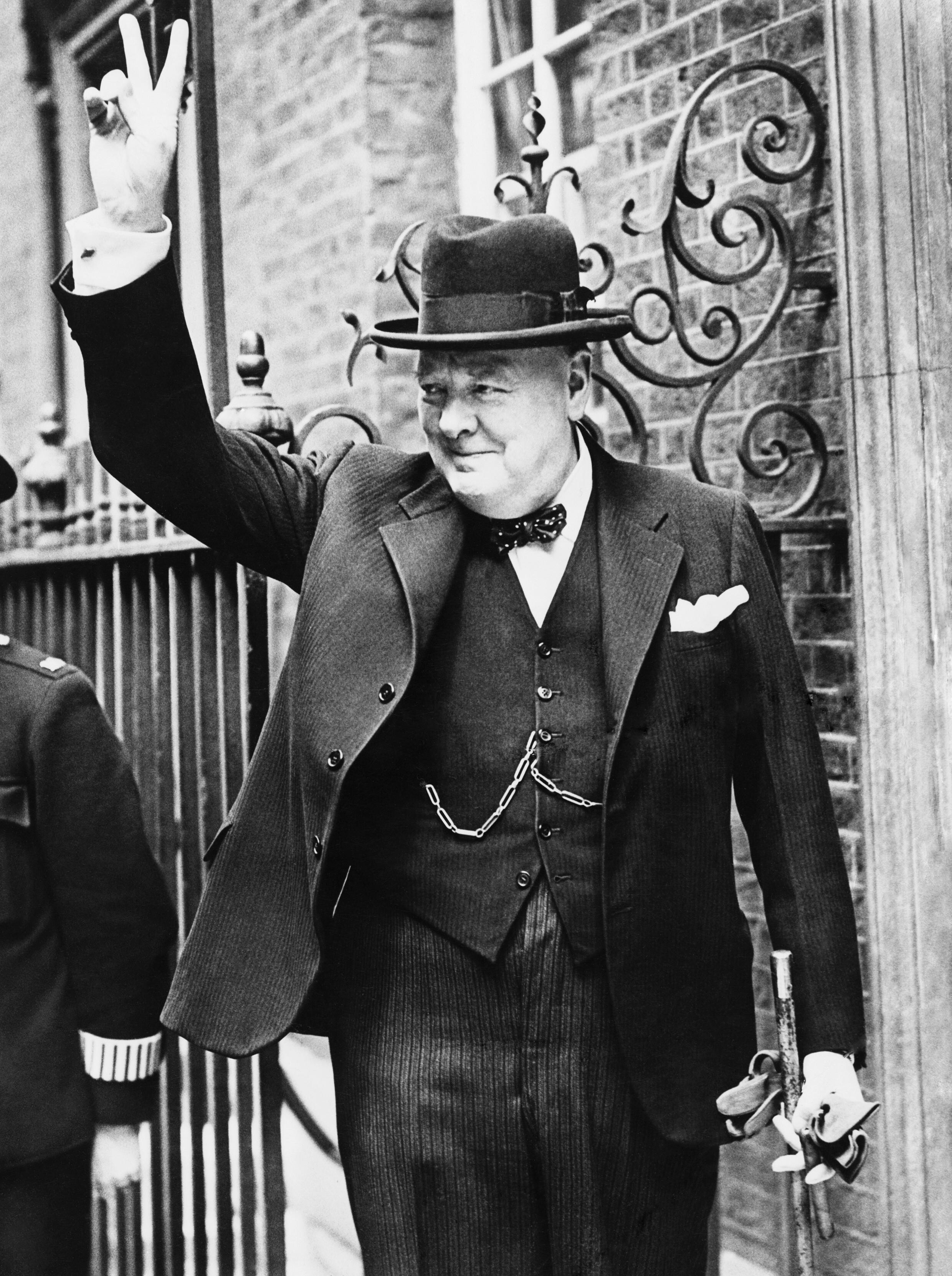
Winston Churchill giving his "V" sign during World War II on Downing Street, London wearing a black homburg hat

The homburg had initially been popularised in Britain by King Edward VII who often visited Bad Homburg in Germany. It was essentially a more rigid variant of the trilby which had been fashionable since George du Maurier's novel of that name was published in 1894. The writer and broadcaster Rene Cutforth recalled in the 1970s that:

one of things that strikes me most about the Thirties scene when I think about it now is the trilby hat, the universal headgear of the middle classes ... Sometime early in the century, it must have been a wild gesture of freedom and informality ... By the Thirties it had certainly become degenerate ... It was a hat which had lost all aspiration: it had become a mingy hat ... .

In such circumstances Eden's adherence to the homburg seemed fresh and dashing. He is one of only two British Prime Ministers to have had an item of clothing named after him, the other being the Duke of Wellington (his boot).

== Eden's style ==
Eden became, at 38, the youngest Foreign Secretary since William Pitt the Younger in the late 18th century. As a relatively youthful politician among mostly much older men, he appeared fashionably dressed, even flamboyant. In 1936 the American magazine Time referred to his "pin-stripe trousers, modish short jacket and swank black felt hat", worn during a diplomatic mission to the League of Nations in Geneva. Many remarked too on Eden's "film star" appeal, even as late as the 1950s when, as Prime Minister, he retained his youthful good looks. His biographer D. R. Thorpe, who likened the young Eden to a mixture of Sir Galahad (Eden won the Military Cross in the First World War) and Beau Brummell (the Regency dandy in whose London house Eden lived for a time), commented on a photograph of him, arriving in Russia by train in hat and fur-lined coat in 1935, that "it seemed to some as if Tolstoy's Count Vronsky [a glamorous character in the novel Anna Karenina] were alighting at the platform".

In addition to the homburg, Eden was associated with the mid-1930s fashion for wearing a white linen waistcoat with a lounge suit, while the poet and novelist Robert Graves likened Eden's moustache to those of film stars Ronald Colman, William Powell and Clark Gable: "the new moustache was small, short and carefully cut, sometimes slightly curved over the lip at either end, sometimes making a thin straight line". When Eden visited New York City in 1938 he was "deluged with fan mail from teenage college girls to elderly matrons", while women reporters and society editors "gushed about his classic features, his long dark eyelashes, his limpid eyes, his clear skin, his wavy hair, his charm and magnetism". In another American city, a display of homburgs in a shop window was adorned with the sign "Welcome to Anthony Eden". In Amsterdam the hat became known as the "Lord Eden".

=== "Heads like his" ===
The journalist Malcolm Muggeridge, who was not an admirer of Eden, recalled that, among other qualities, "an elegant appearance and an earnest disposition ... equipped him for dazzling advancement ... An astrakhan collar became him. What came to be known as an Anthony Eden hat grew on heads like his". In June 1938, four months after Eden's resignation from Neville Chamberlain's Cabinet, the Member of Parliament and diarist "Chips" Channon noted that he had "doffed his bowler" to Chamberlain in St. James's Park and that "everyone wears a bowler now ... [Si]nce the Eden debacle black homburgs are "out"". However, in August of that year, the British Minister in Prague, Basil Newton, wore "a black homburg of the kind made fashionable by Anthony Eden" to greet Lord Runciman on his arrival by train at Wilson station for talks with the Czechoslovak government. In 1939, writing to a former classmate during a European tour, the future United States President John F. Kennedy remarked that he had not been doing much work, "but have been sporting around in my morning coat, my 'Anthony Eden' black homburg and white gardenia".

=== The "glamour boys" ===
There were those who believed, like Muggeridge, that Eden's rapid rise through the political hierarchy owed as much to image as to substance. In the period between his resignation and his return to the government on the outbreak of war in 1939, Eden and his acolytes, who, broadly speaking, favoured a tougher stance against Adolf Hitler and Benito Mussolini, were often referred to as "the glamour boys". Harold Nicolson, a member of this group who found Eden's approach ineffectual, observed that Eden was missing "every boat with exquisite elegance".

Some contemporary observers thought they detected a "prima donna" streak in Eden's attitude and appearance. For example, the ageing Earl of Crawford and Balcarres (1871–1940), a snob, thought him "vain as a peacock and all the mannerisms of a petit maître [in the sense of a dandy or fop]". One of Eden's permanent secretaries, P. J. Grigg, who rarely had a good word to say of anyone, dismissed him as "a poor feeble little pansy". Less prosaically, W. F. Deedes, a Minister in Eden's Government who, as a journalist, had once commented unfavourably on the colour of Eden's socks, remarked half a century later that, in the modern vernacular, Eden would have been called a "smoothie". The philosopher Bertrand Russell thought Eden "not a gentleman" because he dressed "too well", while a Ministerial colleague R. A. Butler, alluding to Eden's parentage and highly strung nature, is said to have remarked, "that's Anthony – half mad baronet, half beautiful woman".

The writer and critic A. N. Wilson, who observed in 2008 that Eden was "easily the best-looking individual, of either sex, to occupy [the] office [of Prime Minister] in the twentieth century", noted also that he was "the only male Prime Minister known to have varnished his fingernails". However, there is little objective evidence that Eden was unduly vain about his clothes; he merely dressed well. As for his homburg, which Deedes noted that he wore at an angle, his official biographer Sir Robert Rhodes James, wrote that "to him it was just a hat".

== The hat as a trademark ==
External image
- Going it alone: Vicky cartoon, 12 April 1954, at Gettyimages.co.uk. John Dulles is depicted as a bull in a china shop, while Eden (identified by his hat) looks on.

Even so, the image stuck. The hat became a "trademark" in the public mind, assisting instant recognition, and was one of the most recognisable features of contemporaneous political cartoons. During the general election campaign in 1955, when Eden was Prime Minister, he was presented with "an Eden hat" when he and Lady Eden (he became a Knight of the Garter in 1954) visited the Lancashire hat-making town of Atherton. At various points of the Suez Crisis the following year, cartoons depicted him in the same hat for which he had become known twenty years earlier. In one by Vicky for the New Statesman, a behatted but otherwise barely clothed Eden was shown in the biblical Garden of Eden being tempted with an apple by a young Frenchwoman, presumably Marianne, in the guise of Eve. (The allusion was to French pressure for joint action to reverse the unilateral nationalisation of the Suez Canal by Egyptian President Nasser.)

=== "Hush! here comes Anthony" ===
In 1951, two days after Eden's re-appointment as Foreign Secretary, Vicky had, in similar vein, employed the imagery of Antony and Cleopatra to represent Eden approaching the Egyptian throne in suit and hat. King Farouk (overthrown in 1952) and the ancient Queen Cleopatra, as the embodiment of the Egyptian state, were shown to have torn up the treaty of 1936 which provided for Britain's military presence in the Suez Canal zone. The caption, "Hush! here comes Anthony", was taken from Shakespeare. (This cartoon was a reference to Egypt's denunciation of the treaty on 9 October 1951, thus posing an early problem for Winston Churchill's incoming government.)

=== Hatless ===
Journalist and social historian Anne de Courcy has written of Chamberlain that "he did not smoke a pipe, nor, as Anthony Eden did, always wear the same distinctive hat, though cartoonists made the most of his ever-present umbrella". (On Guy Fawkes Night 1938 the future Prime Minister Harold Macmillan, then a rebellious Conservative MP, burned an image of Chamberlain with rolled umbrella, which he topped with his own homburg.) In fact, as photographs from the late 1930s onwards show, Eden frequently wore no hat at all. This was a habit that he shared with few other public men at the time. It was one of several aspects of modernity noted by John Betjeman in his poem on the death in 1936 of King George V, who, like Edward VII before him, had worn a homburg for shooting:

At the new suburb stretched beyond the runway
... a young man [King Edward VIII] lands hatless from the air".

== The Anthony Eden in popular culture ==
The Anthony Eden hat was essentially an accessory of the 1930s and 1940s, although, in the mid-1950s, the homburg came to be associated with the melancholic image of comedian Tony Hancock. In 1949 a character (Mr. Sowter) in John Dighton's play The Happiest Days of Your Life had been described as "soberly dressed. He wears an "Anthony Eden" hat and carries gloves". The Suez débâcle, followed by Eden's departure from public life in 1957 due to ill health, tended to hasten the drawing of a line that might have seemed inevitable before long in the era of "Angry Young Men", rock 'n' roll and Vespa motor scooters which, according to his wife Clarissa, kept Eden awake at night. As the communist historian Eric Hobsbawm put it, "Suez and the coming of rock-and-roll divide twentieth century British history".

=== "Who wears an Anthony Eden hat today?" ===
In the 1960s, when hats for men were becoming unfashionable, former diplomat Geoffrey McDermott asked, with evident disdain, "who wears an Anthony Eden hat today? Only Mr Steptoe [a character in a BBC television sitcom], Mr Enoch Powell and, rather curiously, [Russian leader] Mr Kosygin. And, of course, all those Carleton-Browne characters at the F[oreign] O[ffice]". Memories did linger, however. In 2006, the son of a Wolverhampton ironmonger recalled a very wet evening on which Enoch Powell, the local Member of Parliament throughout the 1950s and 60s, required a new washer for a tap: "his moustache quivered with urgency and water streamed from the broad rim of his black Homburg hat."

Another well-known wearer of an "Anthony Eden" was Sergeant Arthur Wilson (played by John Le Mesurier) in Dad's Army (1968–77), the BBC TV comedy series about the wartime Home Guard, which Eden established in 1940. In one episode, Captain Mainwaring (Arthur Lowe), who, as manager of a bank, wore a bowler, told Wilson that his hair was too long. Wilson replied that "Mrs Pike [his lover] says it makes me look like Eden".

In 1969 the Kinks recorded for their album Arthur (Or the Decline and Fall of the British Empire) a song called "She's Bought a Hat Like Princess Marina". This was written by Ray Davies (b. 1944), who was only twelve when Eden resigned as Prime Minister, and contained the lines:

He's bought a hat like Anthony Eden's
Because it makes him feel like a Lord

=== Who Wants to Be a Millionaire? ===
On 10 September 2001, Charles Ingram was asked "What type of garment is an Anthony Eden?" as his £250,000 question on the quiz show Who Wants to Be a Millionaire?

== See also ==
- List of hat styles
