= James Smith & Sons =

Traditional umbrella shop in London

Coordinates: 51.516841°N 0.126660°W

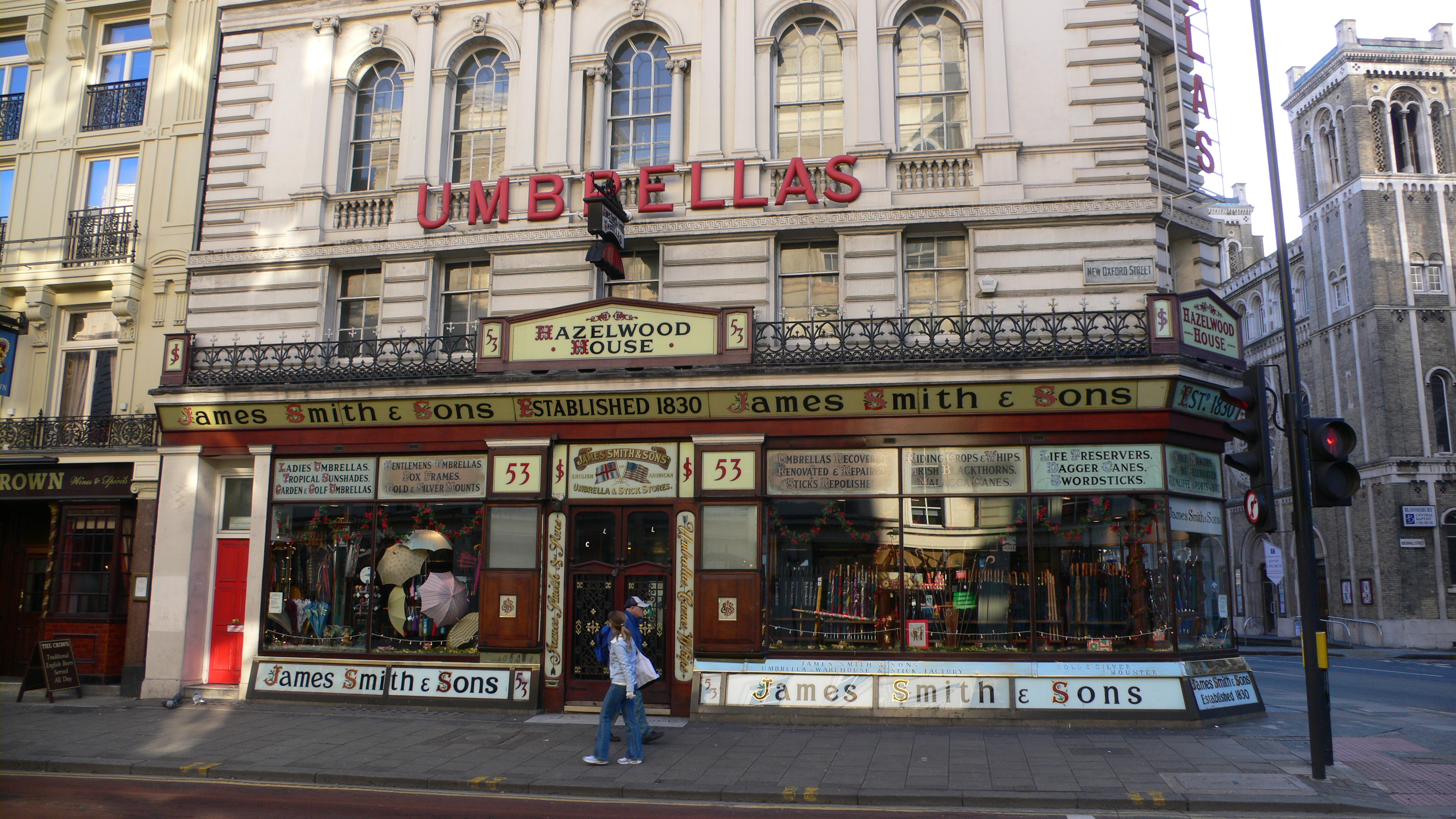
James Smith & Sons umbrella shop on New Oxford Street, London

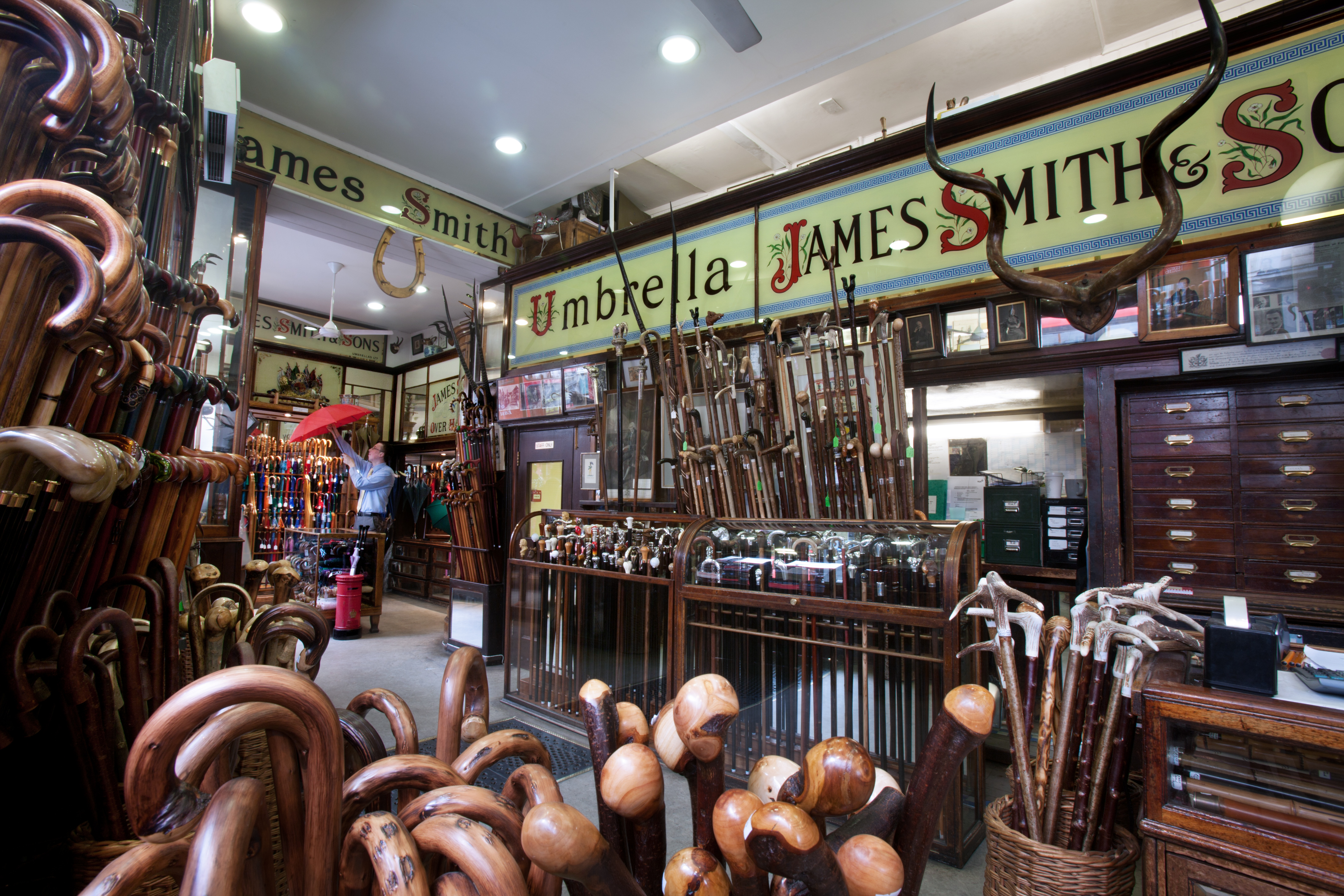
Interior of the shop

James Smith & Sons is an umbrella shop in London. The premises in New Oxford Street is Grade II* listed.

== History ==
It was founded by James Smith as a single shop in Foubert's Place in 1830. Further branches were established in Savile Row and New Burlington Street and the main premises is now in New Oxford Street. The shop-fittings there were constructed around 1865 and the shop still has a traditional Victorian character.

== In popular culture ==
- In the 2011 film Captain America: The First Avenger, the storefront of James Smith & Sons appears in the CGI background of a shot, but the name is changed to Henry Cooper & Sons.
- In the 2014 biography A Spy Among Friends: Kim Philby and the Great Betrayal, historian Ben Macintyre includes the detail that Philby owned a James Smith and Sons umbrella
- The shop featured in episode four of the BBC's 2015 production of Agatha Christie's Partners in Crime.
- In the movie Spooks: The Greater Good, the shop is used as dead drop point for agents contacting each other covertly.
- The shop is mentioned and illustrated in the children's book Gaspard's Foxtrot by Zeb Soanes and James Mayhew.

== See also ==
- Thomas Brigg & Sons
- Fulton Umbrellas
- Swaine London
