= Whangee =

Type of bamboo

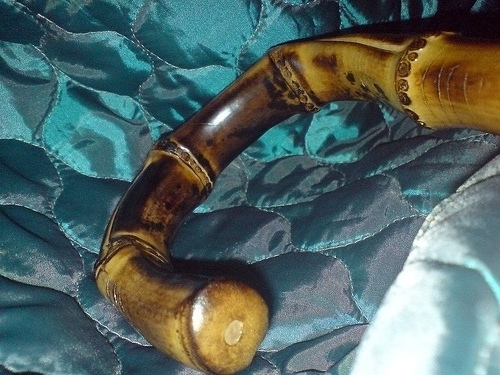
A Whangee umbrella handle

Whangee (/ˈhwæŋiː/ WHANG-ee) refers to any of over forty Asian grasses of the genus Phyllostachys, a genus of bamboos. They are a hardy evergreen plant from Japan, China, and the Himalayas whose woody stems are sometimes used to make canes and umbrella handles. The word derives from the Chinese (Mandarin) huáng lí. It can also refer to a cane made from whangee.

John Steed, the dapper secret agent from television's The Avengers, carried an umbrella with a whangee handle made by British Umbrella maker Swaine Adeney Brigg. Charlie Chaplin's character, The Little Tramp, is famously known for his whangee cane.

The firm of Dunhill created custom smoking pipes and cigarette holders out of whangee, lacquering the surface of the plant stems and adding a black plastic or Bakelite mouthpiece. Terry-Thomas, the well-known British comedic actor, habitually used an 8-inch (20 cm)-long custom black lacquered whangee cigarette holder. It became his trademark and is seen in most of his publicity photographs. His collection included a valuable holder with a spiral of diamonds set in gold over the black lacquered whangee. It was stolen from his dressing room by a young Jimmy Tarbuck and was recovered in a damaged state.

Bertie Wooster in The Inimitable Jeeves (chapter 1) says, "Then bring me my whangee, my yellowest shoes, and the old green Homburg. I'm going into the park to do pastoral dances." The author, P.G. Wodehouse, does not elaborate on the meaning of whangee, assuming that any of his audience would immediately know to what it refers.

Sylvester McCoy used an umbrella with a whangee handle during his early days as The Doctor.
