= G. & J. Zair =

Independent whip-makers (1830s-1927)

- Industry: Manufacturing
- Founded: 1830s in Birmingham
- Founder: John Zair
- Fate: Acquired by Swaine & Adeney in 1927
- Successor: Swaine Adeney Brigg
- Headquarters: Birmingham, United Kingdom
- Key people: John Zair (c. 1809–1881); George Zair (1839–1914); John Zair Jr (c. 1842–retired in 1893); George Percy Zair (1877–retired in 1947)
- Products: Whip-makers
- Parent: Swaine Adeney Brigg (from 1927)

G. & J. Zair were independent whip-makers founded in the 1830s in Birmingham until they were bought by Swaine & Adeney in 1927.

== History ==
In Pigot's Commercial Directory of 1837 John Zair is listed as a whip-maker trading at 8 Exeter Row, Birmingham, in the heart of the manufacturing quarter by Gas Street Basin. Recorded still in the 1841 census as whip-maker, he was by 1849 trading from 280 Great Colmore Street as a "manufacturer of every description of whips".

John Zair was something of a philanthropist: he served as governor of the Queen's Hospital and was an annual subscriber to the Lying-In Hospital and the Eye and Ear Dispensary and made donations to good causes.

His two sons George and John Jr would later take over the business and become the G. and the J. of the company name. They had their own factory built in Bishop Street, possibly based on drawings by the Birmingham firm of architects and surveyors, James & Lister Lea, who managed the building's affairs well into the twentieth century. When John Zair Jr retired in 1893, George carried on with the assistance of his son George Percy.

The silver mark of "G&J.Z." was registered with the Birmingham Assay Office in 1884.

George Percy Zair took over running the firm after his father died in 1914. Having successfully steered the firm through the war, he incorporated the firm as G. & J. Zair Ltd in 1924. By the end of 1926 he and his widowed mother, who between them held most of the shares, decided to sell the company to Swaine & Adeney Ltd. George Percy stayed on as manager of the Birmingham factory with an annual salary and a share bonus and became a director of Swaine & Adeney Ltd.

The Zair name was kept alive and the whips continued to be made in Birmingham, as well as some other Swaine & Adeney leather goods. The making of whips for other companies and outlets also continued. The premises on Bishop Street remained in the ownership of George Percy and his mother and were leased out to the new parent company. On George Percy's retirement in 1947 the building was sold to Sir Robert Gooch, Bt of Benacre Hall, Suffolk. He leased it to G. & J. Zair until 1965, when Swaine, Adeney, Brigg & Sons Ltd took the decision to concentrate their manufacturing at their new Great Chesterford factory in Essex. At that point the use of the Zair name was discontinued.

== Output ==
Besides quality gift and presentation whips, the firm made more utilitarian whips in vast numbers for sale at home and abroad. Whips were made to meet the requirements and climates of their customers. Whips with flywhisks were popular in countries where flying insects were a nuisance. Long stock whips were essential for the cattle ranchers of South America and Australia. Whips conforming to the differing regulations of equine sports in various countries were also made. The firm's success at the world's fairs in Sydney and Melbourne reflected its concern to meet local needs.

John Zair Jr went to Melbourne to assess the market for himself. There he learnt the benefits of kangaroo skin that was to become one of the firm's most important leathers. The trade-mark of the kangaroo holding a whip was registered soon afterwards.

Zair also manufactured whips for local companies to sell abroad under their own names, such as Brace, Windle & Blyth, saddlers of Walsall; William Middlemore, saddler of Birmingham. The firm also made whips branded for retailers abroad such as Greatrex of Johannesburg and Kopf Manufacturing Company of New York.

== Awards at world's fairs and other exhibitions ==
- 1879 Sydney International Exhibition: wins first special prize for its whips
- 1880 Melbourne International Exhibition: wins first prize for its whips
- 1883 Cork Industrial Exhibition: "medal for whips well finished and turned out"

== Trade-marks ==
- Stag's head (in use since at least 1870)
- Kangaroo holding a whip (from c. 1880)
- Merle & Co. (from around 1898 onwards)

== Archival material ==
A significant body of company records for G. & J. Zair is held by Birmingham Archives (MS 160).
