= Fedora =

Felt hat with brim and indented crown

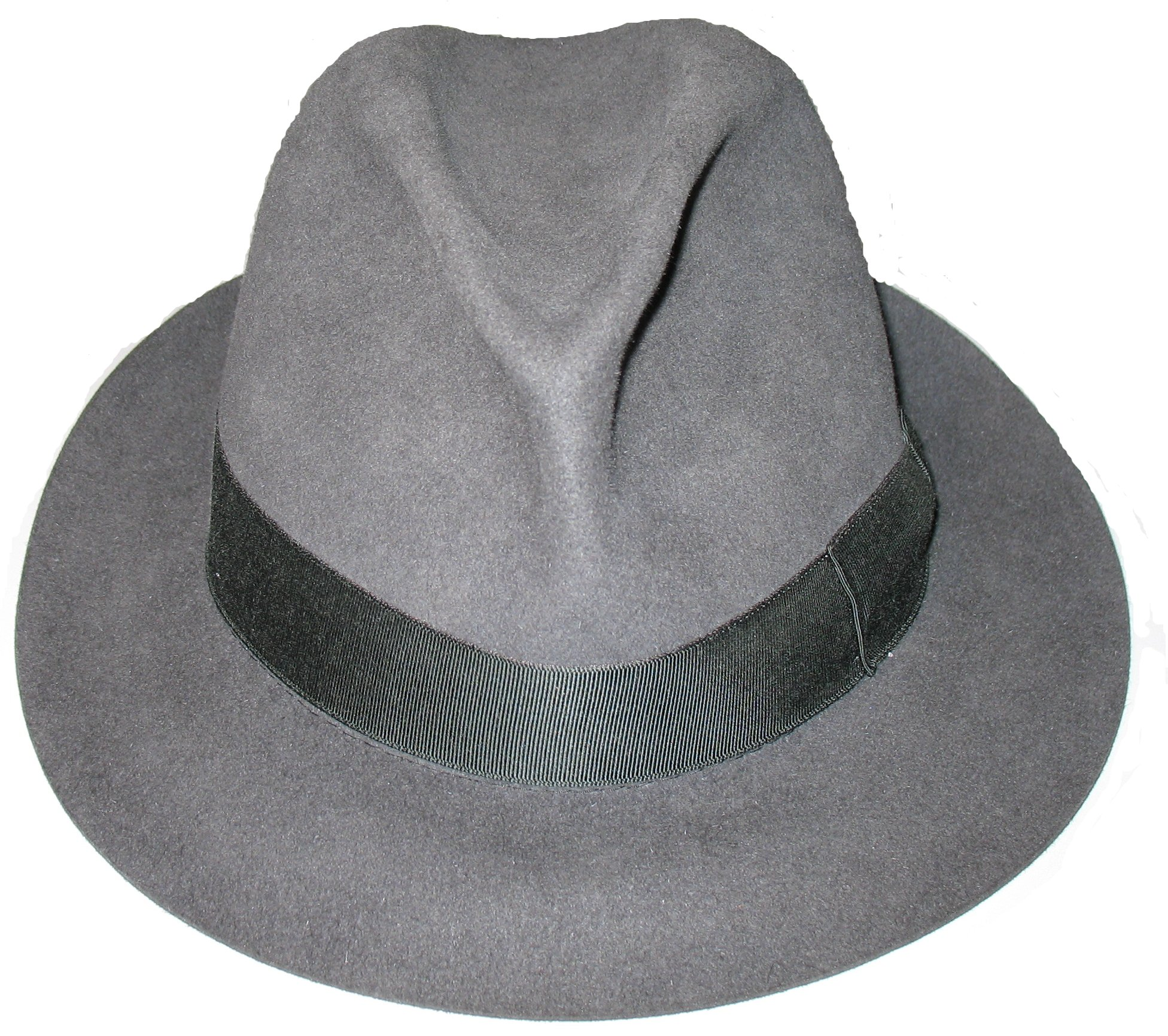
A fedora made by Borsalino, with a pinch-front teardrop-shaped crown

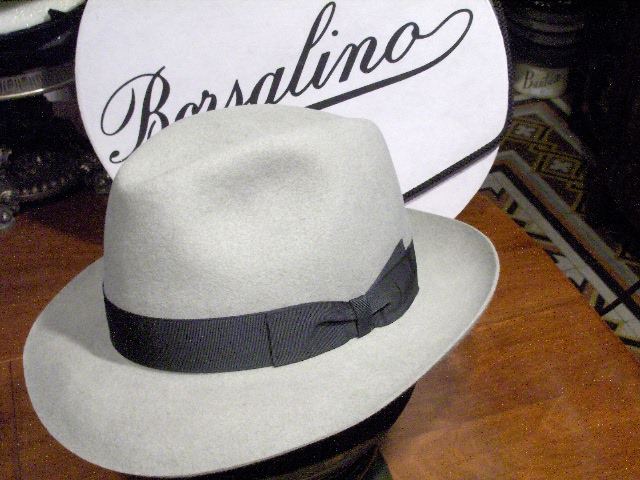
A fedora made by Borsalino with a gutter-dent, side-dented crown, the front of the brim "snapped down" and the back "snapped up"

A fedora (/fəˈdɔːrə/) is a hat with a soft brim and indented crown. It is typically creased lengthwise down the crown and pinched near the front on both sides. Fedoras can also be creased with teardrop crowns, diamond crowns, center dents, and others, and the positioning of pinches can vary. The typical crown height is 4.5 inches (11 cm). The term fedora was in use as early as 1891. Its popularity soared, and eventually it eclipsed the similar-looking homburg. Despite falling out of fashion with other formal men's hats during the 1960s, the hat has seen some resurgence during the 21st century amongst men and women alike, though its current use is generally less associated with formal dress.

The fedora hat's brim is usually around 2.5 inches (6.4 cm) wide, but can be wider, can be left raw-edged (left as cut), finished with a sewn overwelt or underwelt, or bound with a trim-ribbon. Stitched edge means that there are one or more rows of stitching radiating inward toward the crown. The Cavanagh edge is a welted edge with invisible stitching to hold it in place and is a very expensive treatment that requires a highly-skilled craftsman. Fedora hats are not to be confused with small brimmed hats called trilbies.

Fedoras can be made of wool, cashmere, rabbit or beaver felt. These felts can also be blended to each other with mink or chinchilla and rarely with vicuña, guanaco, Cervelt (red deer down), or mohair. They can also be made of straw, cotton, waxed or oiled cotton, hemp, linen, or leather.

A special variation is the rollable, foldaway or crushable fedora (rollable and crushable are not the same) with a certain or open crown (open-crown fedoras can be bashed and shaped in many variations). Special fedoras have a ventilated crown with grommets, mesh inlets, or other penetrations for a better air circulation. Fedoras can be lined or unlined and have a leather, cloth, or ribbon sweatband. Small feathers are sometimes added as decoration. Fedoras can be equipped with a chinstrap, but this is uncommon.

== History ==
The term fedora was in use as early as 1891. As a homburg style in the shape of a Panama Hat, its popularity soared, and eventually it eclipsed the homburg. The word fedora comes from the title of an 1882 play by dramatist Victorien Sardou, Fédora, which was written for Sarah Bernhardt. The play was first performed in the United States in 1889. Bernhardt played Princess Fédora Romazoff, the heroine of the play. During the play, Bernhardt—a noted cross-dresser—wore a center-creased, soft brimmed hat. The hat was fashionable for women, and the women's rights movement adopted it as a symbol. After Edward, Prince of Wales (later the Duke of Windsor) started to wear them in 1924, it became popular among men for its stylishness and its ability to protect the wearer's head from the wind and weather. Since the early part of the 20th century, many Haredi and other Orthodox Jews have made black fedoras normal to their daily wear.

=== Fedoras in early American society ===
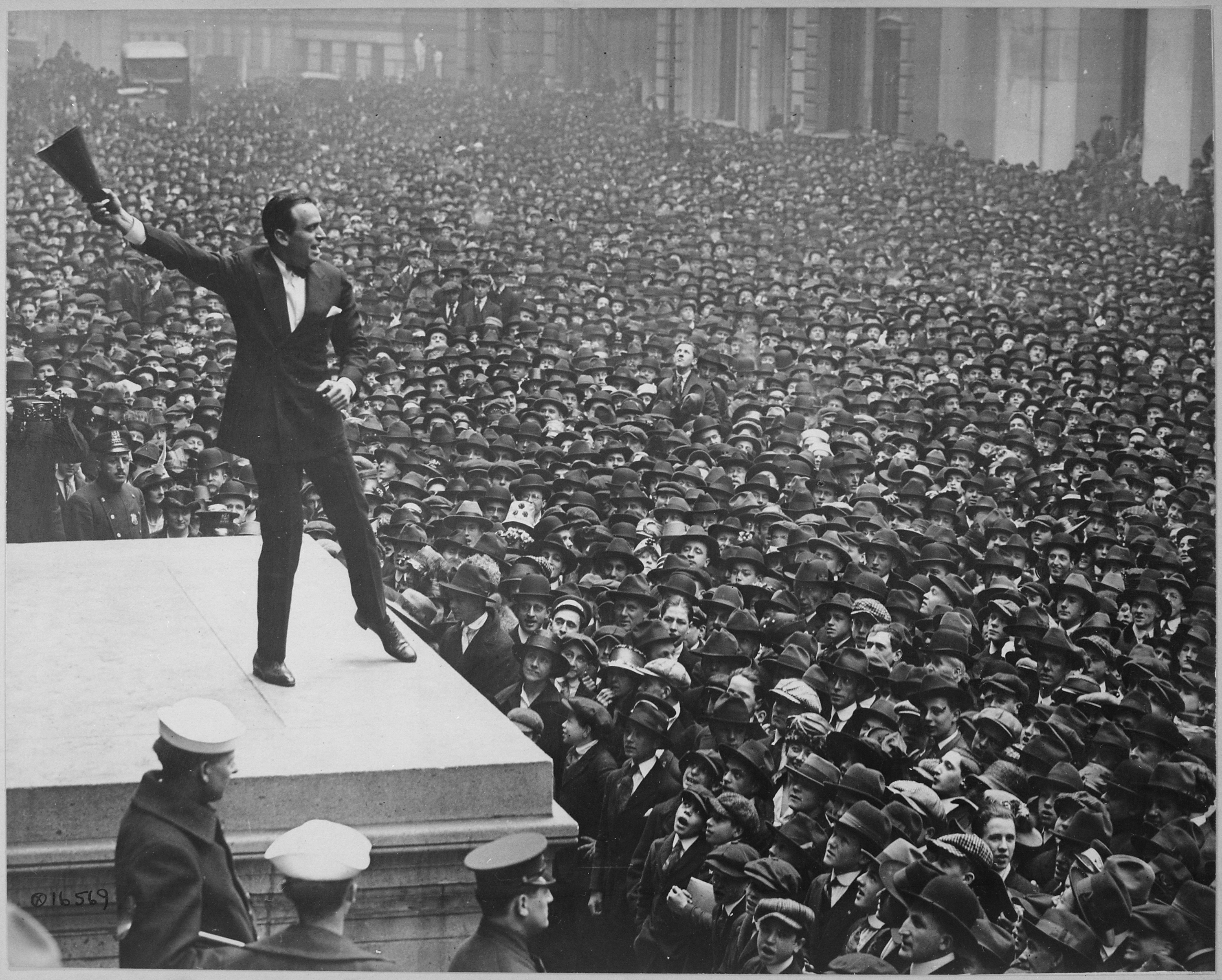
Douglas Fairbanks in 1918 speaking to a large crowd of people wearing hat styles ranging from the fedora to the bowler in New York City

A man wearing a fedora hat in 1937 in Paris

During the early twentieth century, a hat was a staple of men's fashion and would be worn in almost all public places. However, as a social custom and common courtesy, men would remove their hats when at home or when engaged in conversation with women. In addition, the ability to own a hat was culturally considered a sign of wealth due to fashion being recognized as a status symbol. Only those with few economic resources would venture out without a hat. The introduction of a new line of felt hats made from nutria, an animal similar to the beaver, helped establish the fedora as a durable product. Prices, in the first decade of the twentieth century, for a nutria fedora ranged from $0.98 to $2.25. Starting in the 1920s, fedoras began to rise in popularity after Edward, Prince of Wales, adopted the felt hat as his favored headwear. As a result, "the soft felt hat replaced the stiff hat as the best seller in the decade". The fedora soon took its place as a choice hat and joined other popular styles that included the derby and the homburg.

A notable trend that emerged during the rise in popularity of the fedora was to invert the crown of the hat and cut jagged edges across the brim. This style of hat was eventually called a whoopee cap and became a popular alternative to the more formal fedora for mechanics and children of the era.

During the 1940s, the brims of fedoras in the United States started to increase in width, while the British maintained a slightly smaller brim size. The colors of fedoras traditionally included shades of black, brown, and gray. However, this palette grew at the onset of the Second World War to include military-themed colors such as khaki, blue, and green. One of the most prominent companies to sell fedoras was the department store Sears, Roebuck and Company. In addition, famous hat manufacturers which still exist today include Bailey, Borsalino, and Stetson.

=== Women and fedoras ===
In the 1880s, long before the fedora became popular for men, French stage actress Sarah Bernhardt popularized the fedora for a female wearer. In the play Fédora by the French author Victorien Sardou, Bernhardt played Princess Fédora Romazoff. It soon became a common fashion accessory for many women, particularly among activists campaigning for gender equality during the late nineteenth century. The fedora was eventually adopted as a defining symbol of the women's rights movement.

Fedoras continue to be worn by women, but not quite to the same extent as in the early twentieth century. Women's fedoras vary in form, texture, and color. In addition, these fedoras come in almost every color from basic black to bright red and even in the occasional animal print. Along with men's felt hats, women's fedoras were described as making a comeback in an article about 2007 fashion trends. Baseball caps, which had been the staple of headwear, were experiencing a decline in popularity amidst this "fedora renaissance".

== Make and form ==
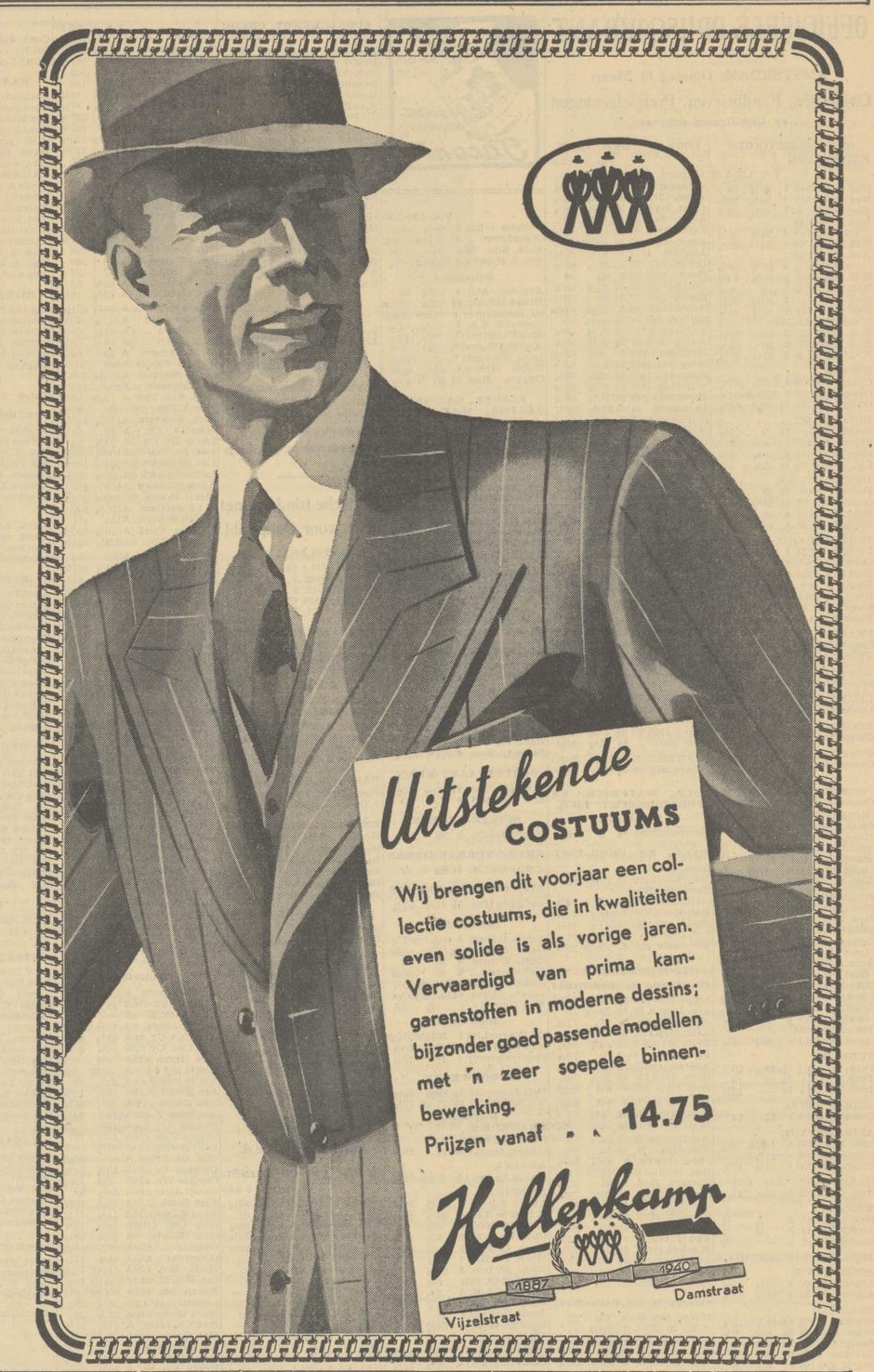
Fedora in advert for menswear in the Dutch newspaper Algemeen Handelsblad on 19 March 1940

Fedoras are usually made by pressing a piece of felt over a mold, and using some kind of heat or sealant to help the felt keep its shape. In the past, molds were created by using a series of wooden blocks to create the shape of the hat, and the felt was pressed on with an iron. The current method is to use metal molds and machinery to create enough pressure to form the shape of the hat. After the general shape of the hat has been achieved, the hat makers attach some sort of decoration, usually a ribbon, between the brim and the crown of the hat. The brim is either left raw, or hemmed. The fedora is considered a soft hat, which means that it is usually constructed from felt, fur, or animal hides. There are variations from hat to hat, but the standard design includes a creased crown, angled brim, a pinch at the top of the hat, and some sort of decoration above the brim of the hat. Men's fedoras especially tend to have stylized brims with edges that are turned down in the front and up in the back. As mentioned earlier, the width of the brim, overall size and color of the hats are subject to change with fashion trends. Women's hats also tend to have more elaborate decorations and slimmer designs.

Because of the soft nature of the hat, many variations are possible with fedoras. One variation of the hat includes the Stetson playboy hat which was common in the 1940s. The Stetson playboy hat involved a marketing success story, with a simple variation on the general form of the fedora becoming a significant trend in America. Al Capone was fond of the playboy style. Many pictures of Capone depict him sporting a Stetson playboy hat.

Contemporary takes on the fedora include asymmetrical brims, bright colors, eccentric patterns, and flashy decorations. Some fedoras are now made from straw, and other unconventional materials. However, despite the increase of artistic hats, the most commonly worn fedoras are still neutral colored, with simple shape and design.

== In popular culture ==
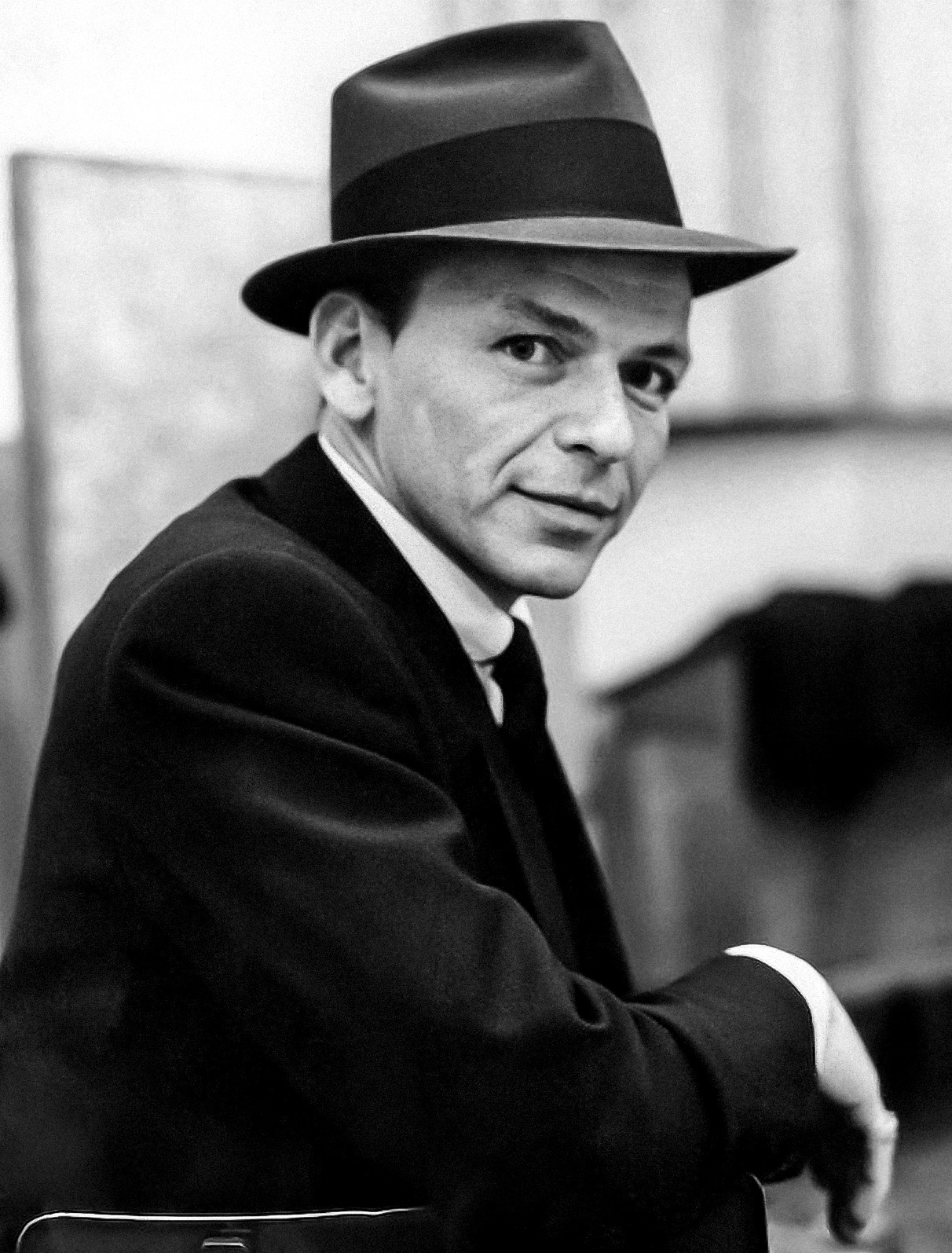
Frank Sinatra, 1957

Coach Tom Landry wore the hat while he was the head coach of the Dallas Cowboys (1960 to 1988). It would later become his trademark image. A cenotaph dedicated to Landry with a depiction of his fedora was placed in the official Texas State Cemetery in Austin at the family's request. In addition the Cowboys wore a patch on their uniforms during the 2000 season depicting Landry's fedora. His panel in the Cowboys "Ring of Honor" features a depiction of a fedora where a uniform number is shown for players.

Indiana Jones re-popularized the fedora in the Indiana Jones franchise. The backstory of how he obtains the hat is told in the prologue of Indiana Jones and the Last Crusade, the third film of the series, and the character who gives him the hat is credited as "Fedora".

The character Freddy Krueger, from the Nightmare on Elm Street franchise, also wears a brown fedora.

The fedora hat of the ninth president of Turkey, Süleyman Demirel, was a famous part of the president's image.

Ice hockey coaches often wore one, most notably coaches Punch Imlach, Toe Blake, Billy Reay, and Murray Armstrong.

In the 21st century, the fedora has made a reappearance in the fashion world along with other types of classic hats such as the porkpie and the homburg. In addition, the fedora has appeared in recent portrayals of movies and television shows that are set in the past, such as Mad Men (2007–15), Shutter Island (2010), and Boardwalk Empire (2010–14). Michael Jackson also frequently wore a fedora while performing on stage.

By the early 21st century, the fedora had become a symbol of hipsters. Vice has referred to the early 2000s as a "fedora renaissance", with celebrities like Johnny Depp and Peter Doherty wearing the hat.

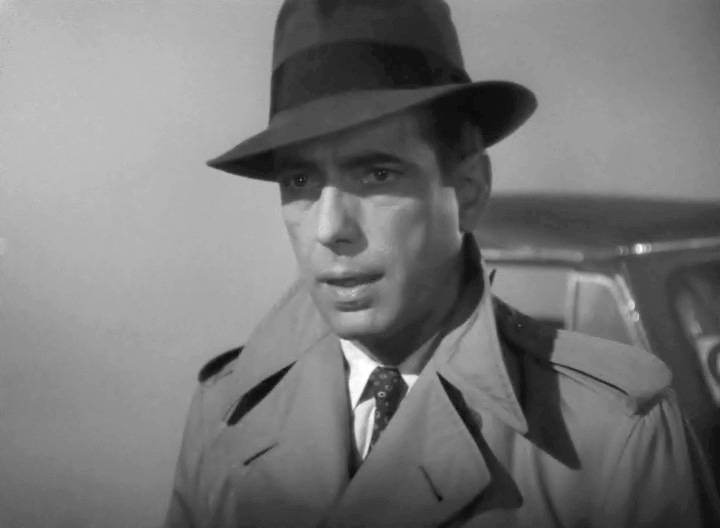
Humphrey Bogart wearing a fedora in the film Casablanca

The fedora was worn by film actors such as Edward G. Robinson, George Raft and Humphrey Bogart. The fedora was a characteristic of film noir and has been the chosen accessory of movie detectives and criminals alike. It was worn by Bogart as Sam Spade in The Maltese Falcon (1941) and Philip Marlowe in The Big Sleep (1946). Peter Eliopoulos wrote in The 1930s: The Reality and the Promise: "The popular Bogart-styled fedora was worn slightly cocked, it was pulled down just above the eye line, so that the wearer peeked beneath the brim and through the cigarette smoke that gathered momentarily before curling itself around the top of the hat."

Billy Wilder wrote and directed the film Fedora (1978), which takes its title from the female lead character played by Marthe Keller. In addition, fedoras are a strong theme throughout the picture. Most of Wilder's films feature fedoras prominently in promotional materials as well as in the finished films.

=== Gangsters and jazz ===
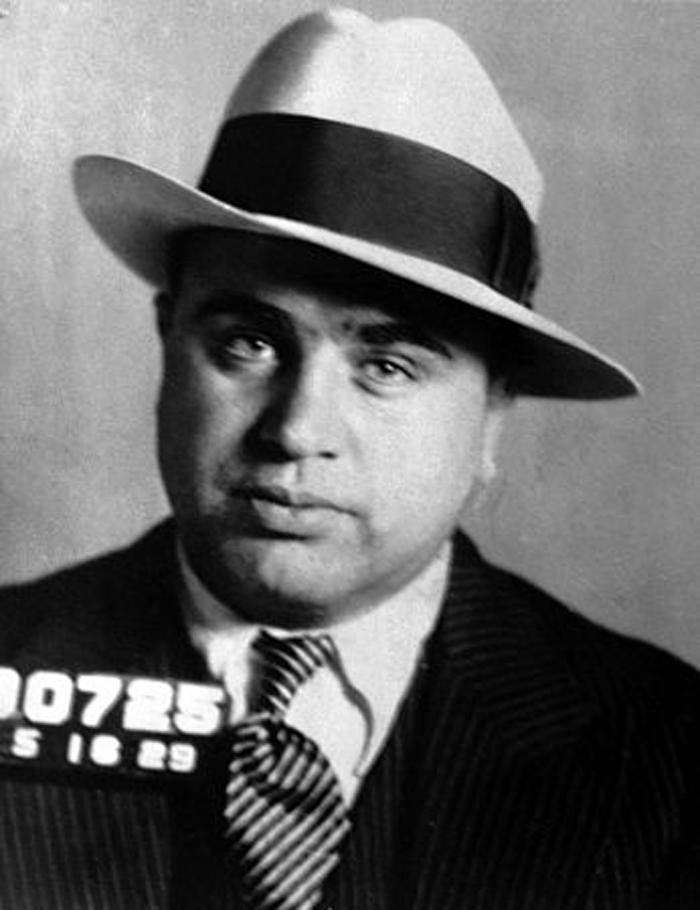
Mugshot of Al Capone by the Bureau of Investigation in 1929

Fedoras were much associated with gangsters during Prohibition era in the United States, a connection coinciding with the height of the hat's popularity between the 1920s and the early 1950s. In the second half of the 1950s, the fedora fell out of favor in a shift towards more informal clothing styles. In addition, well-known gangsters such as Al Capone, Charles Luciano, and Benjamin "Bugsy" Siegel used the fedora to create a "tough guy" image.

Fedoras were an important accessory to the zoot suit ensemble which emerged onto the American fashion scene during the 1940s. Zoot suits were mainly associated with Mexican and African Americans and were largely worn in segregated minority communities. As a result, this style soon spread to local jazz musicians who adopted this look and brought it to their audiences.

In the movie of the same name, the Blues Brothers (who are blues musicians rather than jazzmen) wear black scant-brim fedoras as part of their black suit "uniform".

The association of the fedora with the zoot suit and gangster culture has caused the general public to view it according to this limited connotation.

=== Michael Jackson ===
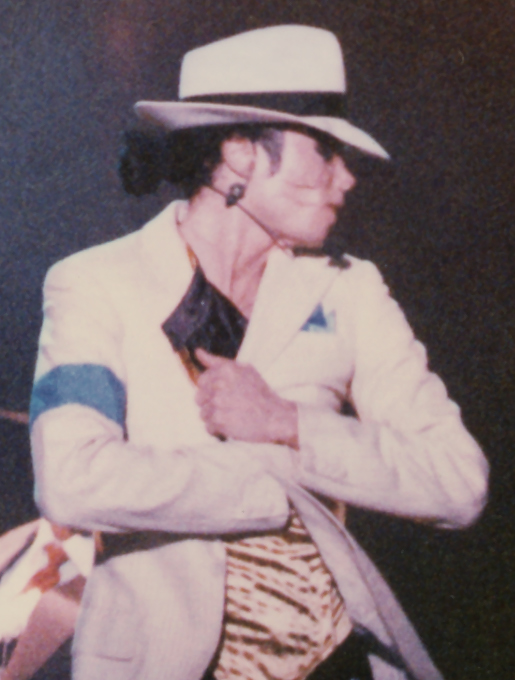
Michael Jackson performing "Smooth Criminal", wearing a fedora in the Dangerous World Tour in Monza, Italy in 1992

American singer-songwriter Michael Jackson wore fedoras during his iconic performances including "Billie Jean", "Smooth Criminal", "Dangerous" and "You Rock My World". Moreover, he wore fedoras during his public appearances for fashion aesthetics and covering of his scalded head as a result of combined effects of lupus and the Pepsi incident in 1984. The fedora quickly became his style in the global outreach and people still attribute the hat to him worldwide.

=== TV ===
Tom Baker wore a fedora when playing the Fourth Doctor in the science fiction series Doctor Who.

== In religious communities ==
=== Orthodox Jews ===
Devout Orthodox Jewish men fulfil their religious obligation of head-covering with the hats similar to the fedora, a Western-invented headgear. Lithuanian yeshiva students in the first half of 20th century wore light hats during prayer and sometimes even while studying, as evident in a rare footage of the Ponevezh Yeshiva and a photo of the Lomza Yeshiva, both in Eastern Europe. Both the footage and the photo show students studying in their hats. Hasidic Jews wore black hats, albeit not fedoras, and in the later half of the 20th century, non-Hasidic (Lithuanian style) yeshiva students began to wear black fedoras (or dark blue or gray). Today, many yeshiva students and Orthodox men wear black fedoras for prayer and many even while walking outside.

== See also ==
- Boss of the Plains
- Cap
- Herbert Johnson
- Homburg hat
- List of hat styles
- List of headgear
- Panama hat
- Pork pie hat
- Trilby
- Tyrolean hat
- Whoopee cap
