= Benjamin Milstein =

British heart surgeon (1918–2013)

- Born: Benjamin Bethel Milstein; 30 September 1918; Dublin, Ireland
- Died: 22 April 2013 (aged 94)
- Education: University College London
- Occupation: Cardiothoracic surgeon
- Known for: Numerous firsts in British heart surgery, experiments in heart transplantation

Benjamin Bethel Milstein (30 September 1918 – 22 April 2013) was a British surgeon and heart surgery pioneer who was heavily involved in the development of cardiothoracic surgery and early heart transplant attempts. He was a longtime employee of Papworth Hospital, a leading British heart and lung hospital.

== Early life and education ==
Milstein was born in Dublin, Ireland, in 1918, the fourth child of Jewish immigrants Hershel and Rebecca Milstein. The family later moved to London, where Milstein's father worked as a tailor. Milstein studied medicine at University College London, graduating in 1942. As a student, he became a socialist and expressed support for the Republican faction during the Spanish Civil War.

== Second World War ==
Following his graduation from university, Milstein was immediately conscripted into the Royal Army Medical Corps. He rose to the rank of acting Major, and served in a medical role in France, Belgium, the Netherlands and Germany during the Second World War.

== Surgical career ==
After the war, Milstein trained as a cardiac surgeon at several British hospitals, including the Royal Brompton Hospital and Guy's Hospital. In 1958, he began working as a cardiothoracic surgeon at Papworth Hospital in Cambridgeshire, where he conducted numerous pioneering surgeries, including Britain's first open-heart surgery. In 1969, Milstein and his colleague Roy Calne conducted experiments into heart transplantation, laying the groundwork for Britain's first successful human cardiac transplant, which was conducted at Papworth in 1979 by the South African-born surgeon Terence English.

Aside from his surgical work, Milstein was heavily involved in medical academia. He lectured in anatomy at Cambridge University between 1977 and 1984, served as the president of the British Thoracic Society in 1980 and edited the medical journal Thorax between 1978 and 1983. He retired from Papworth in 1984.

== Personal life ==
Milstein married Margaret Hargreaves in 1941. After Hargreaves' death in 1994, Milstein lived with Judith Chivers. Milstein died in 2013 at the age of 94; he was survived by three daughters and seven grandchildren. He was a keen amateur musician, painter and gardener, and during his retirement he built himself two violins, a cello and a viola.
