= Köhler & Son =

- Industry: Manufacturing
- Founded: 1780s in London
- Founder: John Köhler
- Fate: Acquired by Swaine & Adeney in February 1907
- Successor: Swaine Adeney Brigg
- Headquarters: London, United Kingdom
- Key people: John Köhler (c. 1754–1801); Elizabeth Köhler; John Augustus Köhler (1805–1878); Augustus Charles Köhler (1841–1890); John Buxton Köhler (1869–1907)
- Products: Brasswind instruments

Founded in the 1780s, Köhler & Son were independent makers of brasswind instruments in London until they were bought by Swaine & Adeney in 1907.

== History ==
When the German-born John Köhler came to England he joined the Royal Lancashire Volunteers in the summer of 1782, but by 1786 he had moved to London and set himself up as a trumpet and French horn maker. He set up shop at 9 Whitcomb Street, but by 1794 had removed to premises at 89 St James's Street, Piccadilly.

When John Köhler died in 1801, his son John (Lewis) Köhler, who had been apprenticed to him, took over the firm. The younger John's untimely death in 1805 meant that his wife, Elizabeth, was already a widow of five months when she gave birth to a son, John Augustus Köhler. It was John Augustus who would turn out to be the musical innovator of the family. During his childhood the firm was run by his mother in partnership with her second husband, Thomas Percival. In 1830 John Augustus set up a new workshop of his own at 35 Henrietta Street, Covent Garden, where he produced a range of high-quality brasswind instruments for the military and orchestral markets. He entered his mark at Goldsmiths' Hall in 1835. With his son Augustus Charles, who reached the age of majority in 1862, he produced instruments inscribed Köhler & Son, the name by which the firm was known thereafter. When he died in 1878, his son took over the business, moving shortly thereafter to premises in Victoria Street, Westminster. In 1879, he brought out anonymously a booklet titled: The Coach Horn: What to Blow, How to Blow It.

Athol Maudslay lavished praise on Augustus Charles and on his instruments."Messrs Köhler stand pre-eminent as the makers of all kinds of horns, particularly coach horns . . ."

When Augustus Charles died in 1890, his son John Buxton Köhler took over the business. The firm, which seems then to have run into financial and trading difficulties, moved several times, ending up in Bromley, Kent. In February 1907, John Buxton sold up to Swaine & Adeney and the firm moved to 185 Piccadilly.

== Output ==
Among customers in the 1790s were the Earl of Egremont's Troop of Sussex Yeoman Cavalry and the Earl of Hardwicke's Cambridgeshire Regiment of Militia. John Augustus proved to be the innovator, holding manufacturing rights, for instance, to John Shaw's "Patent Swivel Valves" as well as to Thomas Harper's "Improved Chromatic Trumpet" and "Newly Invented Walking Stick Trumpet". After the move to Victoria Street, John Augustus's son Augustus Charles shifted the focus of the firm from valved and keyed instruments to natural coach and hunting horns. This was to be an added attraction to Swaine & Adeney as they built up their range of hunting equipment.

== Awards at world's fairs ==
- 1851 Great Exhibition, London: awarded prize medal
- 1862 International Exhibition, London: awarded prize medal

== In public collections ==
This list is by no means exhaustive. See the Galpin Society website for a list of surviving Kohler brass instruments.

- Edinburgh University Collection of Historic Musical Instruments: cornet in B♭ by Köhler, c. 1852, with compression spring action (no. 4266); trumpet in F / E♭ by "Köhler & Son," c. 1885 (no. 227)
- Hunterian Museum, University of Glasgow: trumpet in F with two Stölzel valves (112064)
- Royal College of Music, London: Thomas Harper's Walking Stick Trumpet (possibly by John Augustus Kohler)
- Museum of Fine Arts, Boston: silver keyed bugle hallmarked for London in 1835 (1986.23)
- National Music Museum, University of South Dakota: trumpet in F by John Augustus Köhler, c. 1838
- Warwickshire Museum Service: straight hunting horn in copper with ivory mouthpiece
