= Herbert Johnson (hatters) =

Hatters and cap makers

- Industry: Manufacturing
- Founded: 1889, 45 New Bond Street, London
- Founder: Herbert Lewis Johnson (1856–1942)
- Fate: Bought by Swaine Adeney Brigg in 1996
- Successor: Swaine Adeney Brigg
- Headquarters: London, United Kingdom
- Key people: Herbert Lewis Johnson (1856–1942); Edward John Glazier (1846–1939); Geoffrey John Glazier (1899–1950); Maxwell Henry Glazier (1907–1984); Timothy Glazier (1934–2009); Robin Benson; Anthony Marangos
- Products: Hat and caps
- Website: herbertjohnson.co.uk

Herbert Johnson is a London firm of hatters and cap makers. Founded in 1889 at 45 New Bond Street, the business was bought by the London firm of Swaine Adeney Brigg in 1996.

== History ==
The firm takes its name from Herbert Lewis Johnson, born in the parish of Westminster St James, in 1856, the son of William Johnson, a hatter from Newcastle upon Tyne who had moved to London, where he worked for the hat manufacturers Lincoln, Bennett & Co. of Piccadilly. Herbert was apprenticed to Lincoln, Bennett & Co. in 1872.

When his father died in 1889 he left £500 to Herbert, who likely put the money towards the setting up of his own hat shop that same year at 45 New Bond Street. This was achieved with financial backing and practical help from Edward John Glazier (1864–1939). Herbert Johnson moved to 38 New Bond Street in 1895, where the firm traded until 1975.

When Herbert retired in 1928 aged 72, he sold his interest to Edward Glazier, who turned the firm into a private limited company in 1929, registering the firm as Herbert Johnson (Bond Street) Limited.

In 1975, the firm of Herbert Johnson was forced to leave its old premises at 38 New Bond Street, owing to a proposed rent increase from about £3,500 a year to almost £35,000. A new shop opened at 13 Old Burlington Street, where the firm remained until 1988, when it moved back to New Bond Street (this time to no. 30).

Robin Benson, whom the firm appointed as managing director in 1984, embarked on a programme of expansion based on the use of Herbert Johnson as a brand name. The range of branded products grew to include outerwear, ties, socks, and leather accessories.

It was when the John Crowther Group bought Herbert Johnson (Bond Street) Limited and Herbert Johnson (Sales) Limited that the firm was relocated to 30 New Bond Street, as the first stage of an ambitious plan to open other shops at home and abroad and set up a network of concessions within department stores. These plans did not materialize; John Crowther Group was taken over by Coloroll, who sold off Herbert Johnson to a management buy-out team called the Response Group. In February 1990, as the Response Group went into receivership, Herbert Johnson was sold to its own management. The new company was headed by Anthony Marangos as chairman and managing director. He brought in new designers, notably Sylvia Fletcher, who gave the women's fashion side a new lease of life. Under his leadership the American milliner Prudence also began designing women's hats for Herbert Johnson. But Marangos' tenure turned out to be rather short-lived, for the firm was sold to Swaine Adeney Brigg in 1996 and thereafter shared premises with its new owners, first at 10 Old Bond Street, then at 54 St James's Street, and now in Piccadilly Arcade. Decorative millinery for women was soon discontinued in favour of sporting and hunting hats for men and women and smart dress hats for gentlemen, as well as hats for the military and other uniformed professions. This shift fitted well with Swaine Adeney Brigg's own approach.

== Output ==
As the United Kingdom Census 1901 makes clear, Herbert Johnson's profession then was that of "Hatters' Shop Keeper". The firm's line of business was to design and commission headgear from hatters in London and the hatting workshops of Luton and Stockport.

The firm made a name for its silk-velvet top hats. These hats had a "gossamer body", in other words one with a lightweight shell of fine muslin or cambric coated with shellac. The hatters Lincoln and Bennett, for whom Herbert's father had worked and where he served his own apprenticeship, were credited with developing this technology.

By the time of the World War I (1914–1918) much of the shop's business was taken up with hats for the military. Herbert Johnson devised a new cap with soft top that would be practical for field operations. This was adopted as the dress cap by many regiments.

=== Famous hats ===
In spite of being underwater for almost a hundred years, one of Herbert Johnson's collapsible silk top hats was recovered from the wreckage of the RMS Titanic, which sank in the north Atlantic on the night of 14–15 April 1912. Surprisingly, the hat's label is still legible.

The racing driver Lieutenant-Colonel Goldie Gardner commissioned Geoffrey Glazier to design a protective hat. Geoffrey did so, producing a lightweight but tough helmet. Sir Stirling Moss wore a white version of the Herbert Johnson racing helmet when he won the British Grand Prix at Aintree on 20 July 1957. He later sold the helmet to British Oxygen. This company had it covered in gold leaf and used as the Golden Helmet Trophy for the British Formula Ford Championships, which it sponsored in the 1970s. The helmet fetched £23,000 when it came up for auction at Bonhams in 2009.

Other hats have been used in British television drama: Patrick Macnee's John Steed sported a Herbert Johnson bowler hat in The Avengers; Arthur Lowe's Captain Mainwaring wore a floating-bevel peaked cap in the sitcom Dad's Army; and Tom Baker's Fourth Doctor in Doctor Who wore a Herbert Johnson felt fedora.

On the big screen, Peter Sellers as Inspector Clouseau wore a Herbert Johnson trilby in Blake Edwards's A Shot in the Dark (1964), the second of his Pink Panther series; the felt trilby gave way to a tweed one in later films. Clint Eastwood wore a high-crowned cotton twill trilby in White Hunter Black Heart (1990); and Jack Nicholson as the Joker wore a purple felt fedora in Batman (1989). Both these hats were by Herbert Johnson. There can be little doubt, however, that the most famous cinema exposure for Herbert Johnson was when Harrison Ford as Indiana Jones sported a broad-brimmed, high-crowned "Poet" felt hat in Steven Spielberg's Raiders of the Lost Ark (1981).

The musicians Jimi Hendrix and Mick Jagger both sported Johnson fedoras.

== Logo ==
An antelope sejant with the motto: Latin: "Numquam non paratus" (Never unprepared). The antelope sejant may represent a visual pun, for it is in the crest of the Capps family of Norfolk and Kent.

== Warrants of appointment ==
Appointed Hatter to HM King Edward VII in 1901, other warrants of appointment followed from Nicholas II, Tsar of Russia; George I, King of the Hellenes; and Wilhelm II, Emperor of Germany.

== In public collections ==
- Victoria and Albert Museum: Sir Roy Strong's plush and silk broad-brimmed c. 1970 Herbert Johnson hat
