= Trilby =

Type of hat

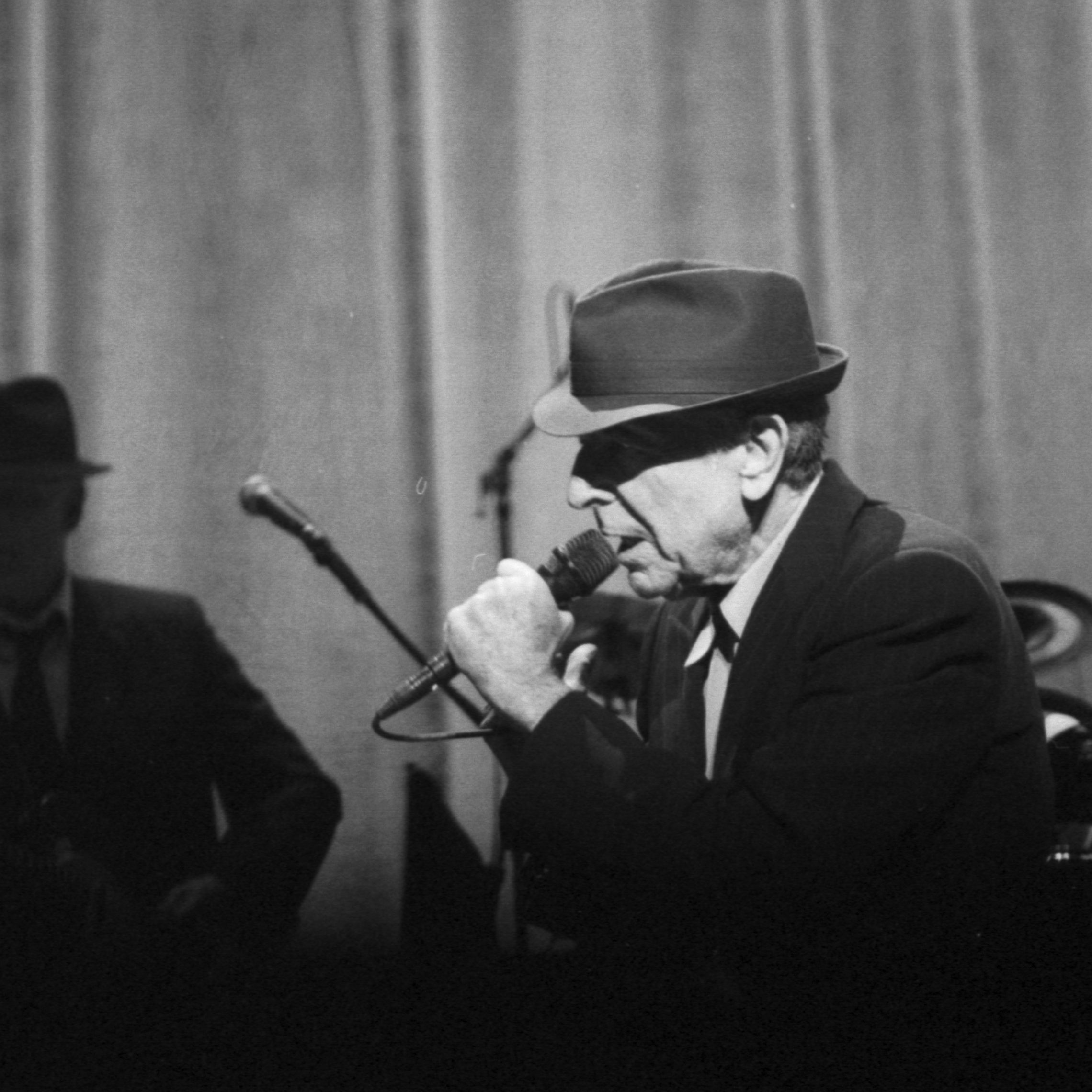
Leonard Cohen wearing a trilby

A trilby is a narrow-brimmed type of hat. The trilby was once viewed as the rich man's favoured hat; it is sometimes called the "brown trilby" in Britain and was frequently seen at the horse races.

The traditional London hat company Lock and Co. describes the trilby as having a "shorter brim which is angled down at the front and slightly turned up at the back" compared to the fedora's "wider brim which is more level". The trilby also has a slightly shorter crown than a typical fedora design.

== History ==
The hat's name derives from the stage adaptation of George du Maurier's 1894 novel Trilby. A hat of this style was worn in the first London production of the play, and promptly came to be called "a Trilby hat". Its shape somewhat resembles the Tyrolean hat.

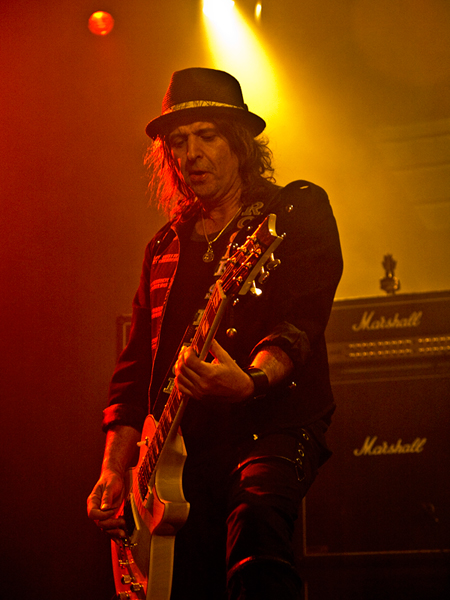
Phil Campbell with trademark trilby

Traditionally it was made from rabbit hair felt, but now is usually made from other materials, such as tweed, straw, heavyweight cotton, wool and wool/nylon blends.

The hat reached its zenith of popularity in the late 1950s and early 1960s; the lower head clearance in post-war American automobiles made it impractical to wear a hat with a tall crown while driving, while also blending in better with the sleeker Italian-inspired tailoring of the time. It remained a common item until about 1970 when men's headwear went out of fashion and men's fashion focused on highly maintained hairstyles instead.

The hat saw a resurgence in popularity at several times in the 1980s, being marketed to both men and women in an attempt to capitalise on a retro fashion trend.

As the use of hats became more of a limited pursuit in the 1990s and 2000s, the trilby became a favoured garment of the hipster subculture, briefly resurfacing as a fashionable item in the late 2000s and early 2010s.

== In popular culture ==
Frank Sinatra was identified with trilby hats, and there is a signature design trilby bearing his name. The reggae poet Linton Kwesi Johnson often wears a trilby during his performances. Peter Sellers as Inspector Clouseau wore a Herbert Johnson trilby in Blake Edwards's A Shot in the Dark (1964), the second of his Pink Panther series; the felt trilby gave way to a tweed one in later films. The cartoon character Inspector Gadget wears a trilby hat.

In the Series 1 episode "The Think Tank" of the television series Are You Being Served?, the Grace Brothers' store policy is revealed to include a hierarchical order for hats that male personnel wear: bowlers for departmental heads and above, homburgs for senior floor staff, and trilbys or caps for junior floor staff.

== See also ==
- Gat (hat)
- List of hat styles
- List of headgear
- Pork pie hat
- Shako, a tall, cylindrical military cap
