= Pendrill Charles Varrier-Jones =

Welsh-born physician who created Papworth Village Settlement

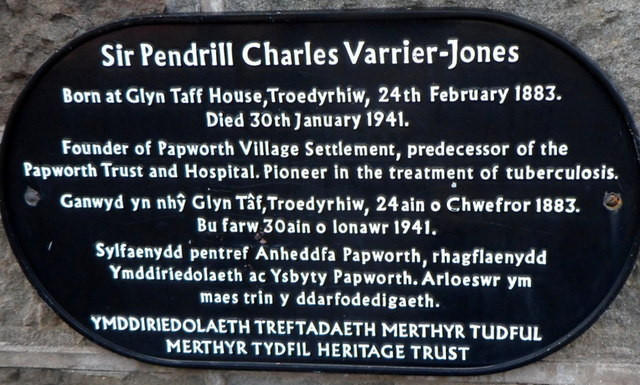
Plaque marking the birthplace of Varrier-Jones at Glyn Taff House, Troedyrhiw, south Wales

Dr (later Sir) Pendrill Charles Varrier-Jones (24 February 1883 – 30 January 1941) was a Welsh physician who created Papworth Village Settlement, an industrial colony for the treatment and rehabilitation of tuberculosis patients. From 1948, the treatment blocks of the settlement were passed to the National Health Service to become Papworth Hospital and the charitable foundation later became the Papworth Trust.

== Published works ==
Incomplete

- Varrier-Jones, Pendrill C., with a preface by G. Sims Woodhead (1916). Tuberculosis and the Working Man: An Appeal to Friendly Societies. Cambridge: W. Heffer OCLC 15236390
- Woodhead, G. Sims & Varrier-Jones, Pendrill; with preface by Sir Clifford Allbutt (1920). Industrial Colonies and Village Settlements for the Consumptive. Cambridge: Cambridge University Press OCLC 977667231 OCLC 941753105 Book available online
