= Royal Papworth Hospital =

- Royal Papworth Hospital NHS Foundation Trust
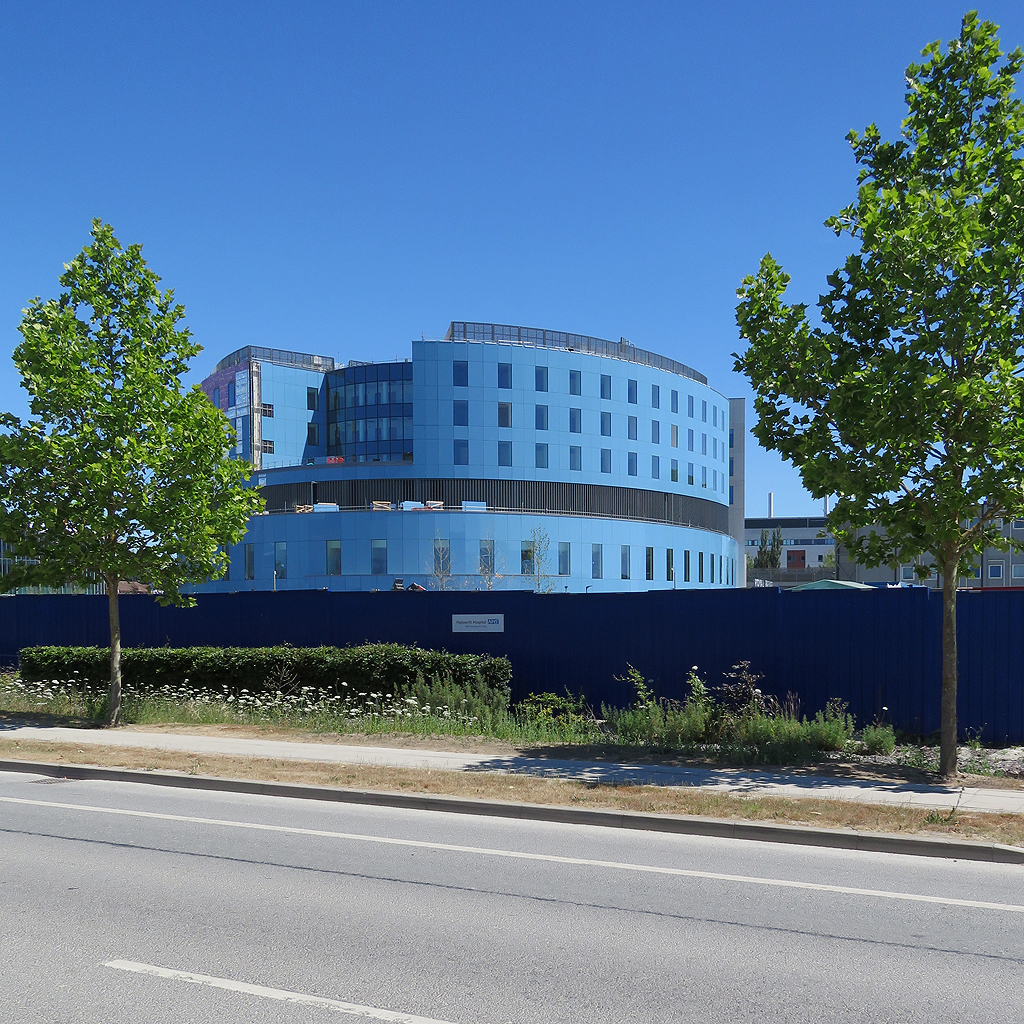
- The new hospital

- Location within Cambridgeshire

Geography
- Location: Cambridge Biomedical Campus, Cambridgeshire, England, United Kingdom
- Coordinates: 52.1736°N 0.1356°E

Organisation
- Care system: Public NHS
- Type: Specialist
- Affiliated university: University of Cambridge Medical School

Services
- Emergency department: No Accident & Emergency
- Beds: 300
- Speciality: Cardiothoracic hospital

History
- Founded: 1918

Links
- Website: royalpapworth.nhs.uk
- Lists: Hospitals in England

Royal Papworth Hospital is a specialist heart and lung hospital, located on the Cambridge Biomedical Campus in Cambridgeshire, England. The hospital is run by Royal Papworth Hospital NHS Foundation Trust.

The hospital is a world-leading cardiothoracic transplant centre and the biggest in the UK, having carried out more heart and lung transplants in 2019/20 than any other hospital. It is also home to the UK's biggest sleep centre, and is one of five hospitals commissioned by NHS England to provide Extra Corporeal Membrane Oxygenation (ECMO) to adults with severe respiratory failure.

== History ==
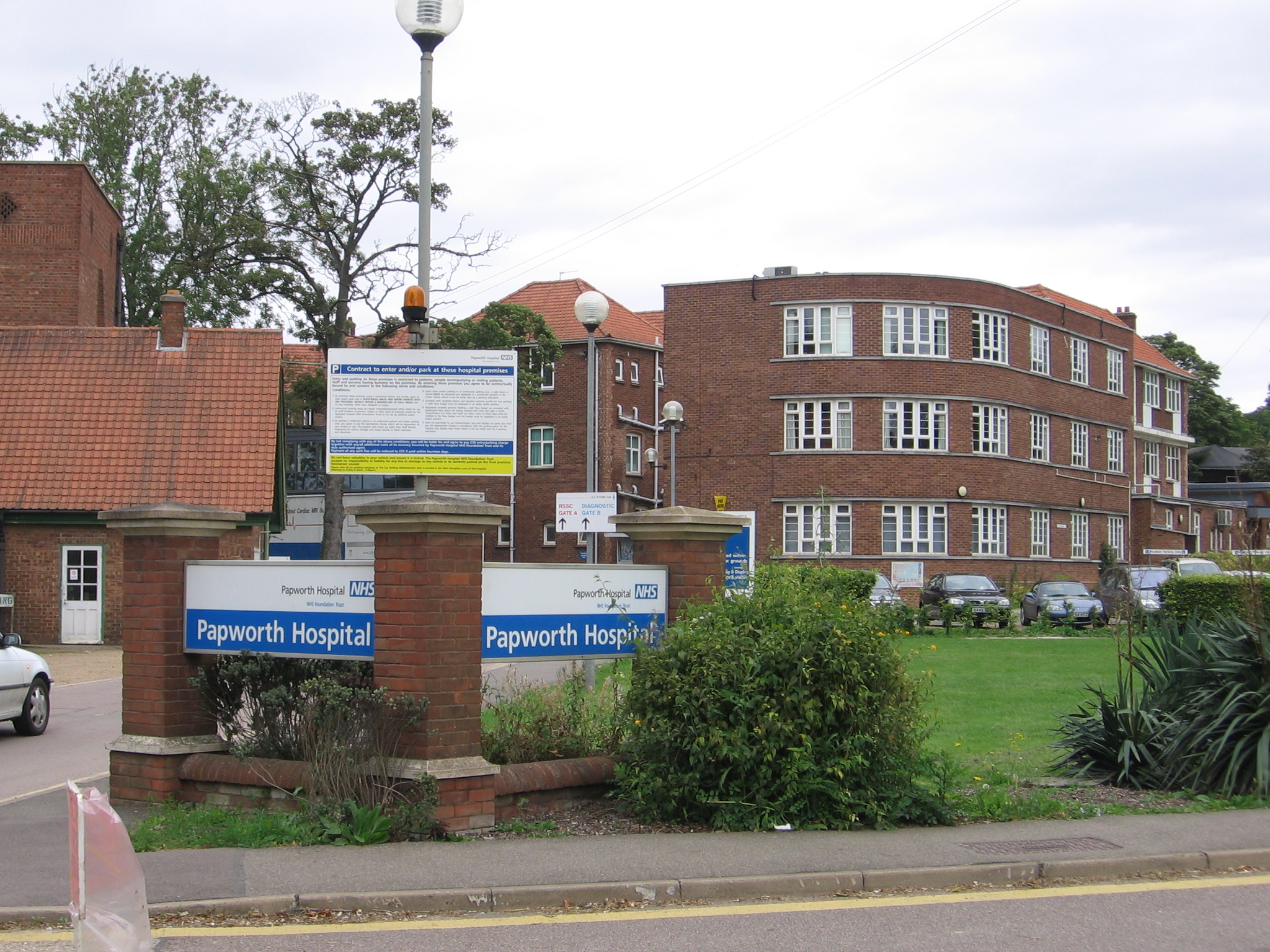
The old hospital at Papworth Everard

Papworth Hospital was founded at Papworth Everard (to the west of Cambridge) in 1918, after a country house had been acquired in 1917 as a sanatorium for the treatment of tuberculosis among discharged soldiers who had served in the First World War, following a campaign led by Elsbeth Dimsdale, and was initially known as the "Cambridgeshire Tuberculosis Colony". The institution was initially under the direction of Dr (later Sir) Pendrill Varrier-Jones. Between 1920 and 1940, the Colony purchased farmland around the village, becoming largest landowner in the parish.

From the 1950s, surgical facilities developed, beginning with thoracic (chest/lung) surgery and expanding to cardiac surgery. Surgeon Ben Milstein performed the first open-heart surgery at Papworth Hospital in September 1958.

In August 1979, surgeon Terence English performed the first successful heart transplant in the UK at Papworth Hospital. The patient, Keith Castle, lived for over five years following his surgery. In February 1980, 23-year-old male nurse Paul Coffey became Britain's thirteenth heart transplant patient, when he was given the heart of a woman who had died in a car crash, by surgeons at Papworth Hospital. In February 1986 Paul Coffey and some of his friends started the 'T' Planters Club which held annual fundraising dinners; the 'T' was in recognition of the pioneer surgeon Sir Terence English. In the four years between its founding and its winding up in 1990, the 'T'–Planters Club raised £109,917.

In 1986, alongside a team from Addenbrooke's Hospital, the world's first heart-lung and liver transplant took place at Papworth Hospital. Surgeons John Wallwork and Roy Calne performed the operation on 35-year-old Davina Thompson.

In August 1994 a team of doctors carried out a revolutionary operation when 62-year-old Arthur Cornhill was given the world's first permanent battery-operated heart.

In May 2014, a new CT scanner was unveiled at the old hospital by its royal patron, the Duchess of Gloucester.

In September 2017, Papworth Hospital was granted the designation "royal" by the Queen and so became Royal Papworth Hospital in January 2018.

The hospital was one of the NHS's leading hospitals in the fight against the Coronavirus (COVID-19) pandemic in the United Kingdom, with some of the best results in the country despite caring for the sickest patients.

In 2020, series 3 of the BBC show Surgeons: At the Edge of Life premiered, with many operations filmed at Royal Papworth Hospital.

=== New building ===
In December 2013 it was announced that the hospital would move to the Cambridge Biomedical Campus next to Addenbrooke's Hospital in Cambridge. Implementation of the scheme was temporarily delayed, following an intervention by HM Treasury, while the Trust investigated an alternative proposal of moving to the Peterborough City Hospital site, a concept to which there was considerable opposition given the financial problems at that hospital. In March 2015, the hospital announced that its move to the Cambridge Biomedical Campus was being procured under a private finance initiative contract. The construction works, which were carried out by Skanska at a cost of £165 million, started immediately.

In April 2019, following the construction of a new hospital, it began its relocation from its previous location in the village of Papworth Everard to the Cambridge Biomedical Campus, treating its first patients in the new hospital on 1 May 2019. The old hospital was home to numerous medical firsts, including the first successful heart transplant in the UK, the world's first successful heart, lung and liver transplant, and one of the world's first non-beating-heart transplants.

The new hospital on the Cambridge Biomedical Campus treated its first patients in May 2019. It was officially opened by the Queen on 9 July 2019.

Fundraising is also taking place for a Heart and Lung Research Institute, a joint venture between Royal Papworth Hospital and the University of Cambridge, to be built on the Cambridge Biomedical Campus adjacent to the new hospital.

== Services ==
Following the construction of the new Royal Papworth Hospital, all services are housed in one purpose-built building. Sub-specialities include:

- the Respiratory Support and Sleep Centre, providing services for patients with sleep disorders (including common disorders such as obstructive sleep apnea and less common ones such as narcolepsy) and those with ventilatory failure (from conditions such as COPD or neuromuscular disorders including motor neuron disease and poliomyelitis). The service provides non-invasive ventilation and also accepts referrals from other intensive care units to wean patients from invasive ventilation;
- the pulmonary hypertension (PH) service (Papworth is one of the four UK Pulmonary Hypertension centres and the only one providing pulmonary thromboendarterectomy);
- the adult cystic fibrosis service;
- the Lung Defense service, for patients with recurrent lung infection, including those with bronchiectasis and immunodeficiency;
- the thoracic oncology (lung cancer) service;
- the ataxia telangiectasia service;
- services for patients with pulmonary fibrosis, vasculitis, and rare diseases including granulomatosis with polyangiitis and pulmonary alveolar proteinosis.
- cardiac surgery, including heart transplantation, coronary artery bypass grafting, heart valve surgery, and pulmonary thromboendarterectomy;
- thoracic surgery, including lung cancer resection and lung transplantation;
- cardiology, including coronary angiography and coronary angioplasty, plus facilities for cardiac electrophysiology and catheter ablation, pacemaker insertion, implantable cardiac defibrillator, transcatheter structural heart procedures such as valve implantation
- intensive care services.

=== Performance ===
Teams at Royal Papworth have conducted the most heart transplants every year in the UK since 2008/09, with the best risk-adjusted survival rates. Its 30-day, one-year and five-year survival rates were the best in the country, with the lowest decline rates.

On 2 November 2007 it was announced that Papworth Hospital would suspend heart transplant activities while an investigation was undertaken into an unexplained rise in recipient mortality rates. The Hospital was given the all-clear on 19 November 2007 after the Healthcare Commission ruled the quality of care was good.

Papworth Hospital was named by the Health Service Journal as one of the top hundred NHS trusts to work for in 2015. At that time it had 1677 full-time equivalent staff and a sickness absence rate of 3.63%. 92% of staff recommend it as a place for treatment and 75% recommended it as a place to work.

In a 2016 survey of 242 hospitals in England it had the fastest responding telephone switchboard, with an average response time of 3 seconds.

In October 2019, Royal Papworth Hospital was rated as 'outstanding' by the health regulator Care Quality Commission. It became the first NHS hospital trust to ever be awarded the top mark of 'outstanding' in each of the five key inspection domains.

In a 2019 survey by the American magazine Newsweek, Royal Papworth Hospital was named as one of the best 100 specialist hospitals in the world.

== Notable patients ==
On 23 December 2011, Prince Philip, Duke of Edinburgh, then 90 years of age, underwent successful coronary angioplasty and stenting at Papworth Hospital. He was advised to stop his hobby of shooting.

In 2016 Mark Serwotka, General Secretary of the Public and Commercial Services Union, UK, underwent heart transplantation for heart failure secondary to viral myocarditis.

== See also ==
- Healthcare in Cambridgeshire
- List of hospitals in England
