= Thomas Brigg & Sons =

Umbrella-makers and cane and whip makers

- Industry: Manufacturing
- Founder: Charles Brigg
- Fate: Merged with Swaine & Adeney on 9 February 1943
- Successor: Swaine, Adeney, Brigg & Sons Ltd, then Swaine Adeney Brigg
- Headquarters: London, United Kingdom
- Key people: Charles Brigg (1783–1830); Thomas Edward Brigg (1805–1881); William Brigg (1831–?); Thomas Brigg Jr (1845–1888); William Henry Brigg (1858–1903); Walter Alfred Brigg (1860–1903); Bertie Walter Brigg (1885–1972); Guy Lenard Brigg (1890–1970);
- Products: Plumassiers and later umbrella-makers and cane and whip makers

Thomas Brigg & Sons, said to have been founded in 1836, were makers of umbrellas and canes in London. They merged with the London firm of Swaine & Adeney to form Swaine, Adeney, Brigg & Sons Ltd in 1943.

== History ==
An insurance record from 1809 provides early evidence that Charles Brigg, a plumassier or feather-maker, was working as a maker and supplier of plumes for the military at 3 Little Warwick Street (now Warwick House Street) off Charing Cross. An advertisement in the Morning Chronicle indicates that by 5 December 1817 he had moved to 63 Charing Cross, where he would work to the end of his career.

In 1828, Charles Brigg's son, Thomas Edward, opened a separate outlet at 23 St James's Street, London. An advertisement in the Morning Post of 21 May 1828 shows that he had added the sale and repair of parasols to his line of business. He was ordered before the Bankruptcy Commissioners in 1829 but it appears that the creditors were placated, for he and his father were able to carry on trading.

The year 1836, said to be that of the firm's foundation, does not seem to have been characterized by a landmark event according to known documentary evidence of the company. However, that very year, John Tallis published a pictorial plan of St James's Street on which No. 23 was labelled "Brigg – Umbrella, Cane & Whip Maker".

By 1852 the firm was trading as Thomas Brigg & Son, reflecting the fact that Thomas's son Edward had joined the family business. When Edward's brother (another Thomas) went into partnership with him, the firm began trading as Thomas Brigg & Sons. The 1861 census listed Thomas Brigg as an umbrella-maker with five employees.

In 1879, the silversmith Charles Henry Dumenil (1853–1921) registered his mark CD at the Goldsmiths' Company. In 1894, jointly with William Henry Brigg, he patented "Improvements in the Combination of Pencils and the like with Walking Sticks and the like". One such walking stick (in full-bark Malacca) with concealed pencil was owned by the artist Augustus John.

The 1881 census listed Thomas Brigg Jr with fifteen employees.

In December 1884, Thomas Brigg & Sons were awarded their first royal warrant as umbrella-makers to Queen Victoria.

in 1899, the firm entered the continental market by opening a showroom at 33 avenue de l'Opéra, Paris, a splendid corner site at the junction with the rue Neuve-des-Petits-Champs (since 1944, the rue Danielle-Casanova) in the 1st arrondissement. This shop brought more royal patrons, among them the King and Queen of Spain. By 1914 there were approved retail outlets for Brigg umbrellas in Barcelona, Berlin, Biarritz, Brussels, Buenos Aires, Florence, Madrid, Naples, Nice, Palermo, Rome and Vienna. In 1919, the firm bought the goodwill and stock of the French parasol makers Bétaille on the rue Royale, Paris.

In his memoirs the cubist painter Amédée Ozenfant told of his proud but short-lived ownership of a Brigg umbrella, for which he had paid the astonishing price of 35 francs as a young man, only to lose it the next day in the métro.

In 1931, Bertie and Guy Brigg turned the business into a limited company, and five years later, to mark the firm's supposed foundation in 1836, brought out the ultra-slim "Centenary" umbrella.

One Brigg umbrella was to achieve world fame. This was Neville Chamberlain's gentleman's black-silk umbrella with Mallaca cane handle spliced onto a Tonkin cane shaft with a gilt collar that he took with him to Munich for talks with Adolf Hitler in September 1938 and to Rome in January 1939 for his visit to Benito Mussolini. Newspapers came to see this umbrella as a symbol of hope. By July 1939, Life magazine was talking about the "umbrella of appeasement". Hitler, resentful of those who attended the Munich conference, poured scorn on what he called "umbrella politicians". It was a sad irony that war should break out only months after Chamberlain had tried to avert it and that soon afterwards, in 1940, the firm of Thomas Brigg & Sons should lose its Paris showroom to the German occupation of France.

In February 1943, the firm joined forces with Swaine & Adeney to become Swaine, Adeney, Brigg & Sons Ltd, the merger overseen by Bertie Brigg. Brigg's gave up its shop on St James's Street but kept its manufactory for sticks and umbrellas at Newbury Street in the City of London.

== Output ==
From relatively early on, Brigg chose to go down the route of individualized umbrella production, buying in the frame components from Fox Umbrella Frames Ltd, but using its own shafts, handles, ferrules, sliders and rib tips, not to mention covers. The firm was quick to complement its umbrella range with high-quality walking sticks.

For day wear walking sticks were lightweight and in wood, bamboo or cane with handles ranging from the discreet to the frivolous, with animal heads being popular. The style and workmanship of some handles suggest that the Czilinsky family of ivory and wood carvers may well have taken commissions from Brigg as it did from Swaine & Adeney.

For evening wear sticks might be of ebonized hardwoods or of exotic material such as tortoiseshell, while the knops might be in gold, crystal or set with jewels. Luxury handles for sticks were commissioned from silversmiths, wood and ivory carvers and turners. Brigg joined in the late Victorian and Edwardian craze for what are now known as gadget or system canes and umbrellas, with concealed pencils, atomizers and other trickery. The silversmith Charles Henry Dumenil was a leading exponent of such gadgetry as well as being a major supplier of mounts to the firm. Among other silversmiths providing mounts were Charles Cooke of Frith Street, Soho, James Damant of City Road and Thomas Johnson.

== Awards at world's fairs ==
- 1908 Franco-British Exhibition, London: Wins the Grand Prix for umbrellas

== In public collections ==
- Three umbrellas at the Metropolitan Museum of Art catalogued as by Thomas Briggs & Sons
- One parasol by Thomas Brigg & Sons at the Gallery of Costume, Platt Hall, Manchester
