= Homburg hat =

Semi-formal felt hat

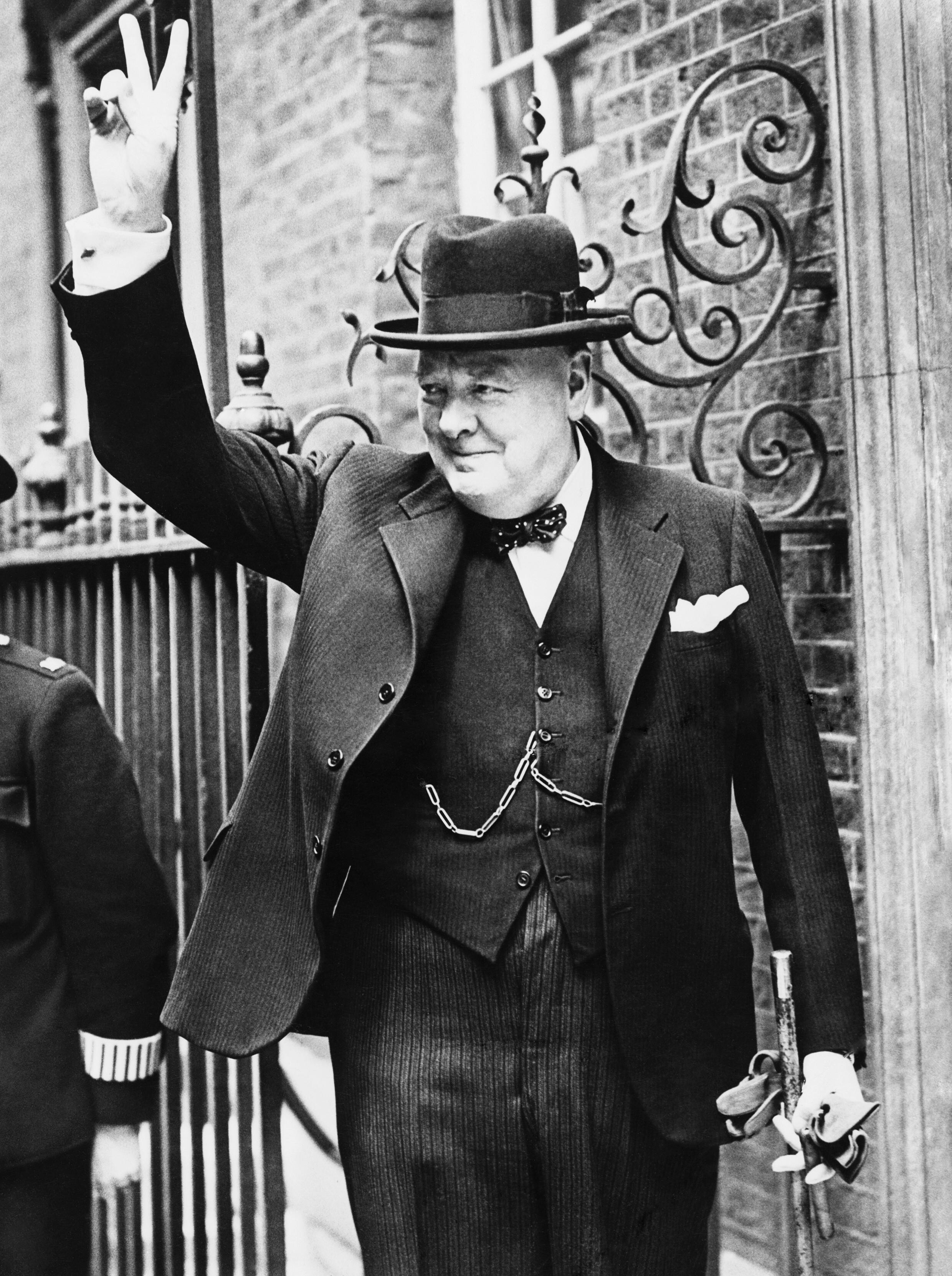
Winston Churchill wearing a homburg hat

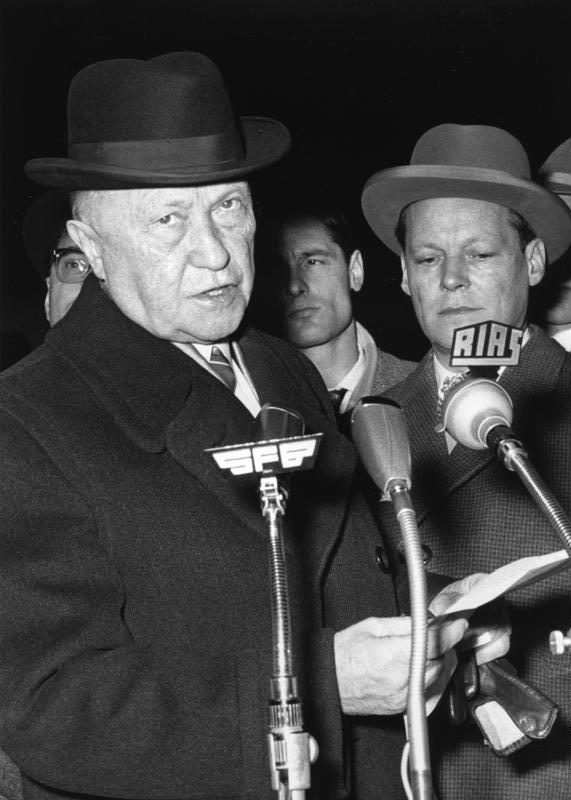
Konrad Adenauer and Willy Brandt wearing homburg hats

A homburg is a semi-formal hat of fur felt, characterized by a single dent running down the centre of the crown (called a "gutter crown"), a wide silk grosgrain hatband ribbon, a flat brim shaped in a "pencil curl", and a ribbon-bound trim about the edge of the brim. It is traditionally offered in black or grey.

The name comes from Bad Homburg in Hesse, in the German Empire, where it originated as hunting headgear. It was popularised in the late 19th century by the Prince of Wales, the future King Edward VII, as a less formal alternative to the prevalent top hat, along with the bowler hat and the boater hat. The original homburg conceived in the 19th century was of slightly more generous proportions than seen in 20th-century versions. Although the homburg is traditionally associated with the dinner jacket (tuxedo) and black lounge suit (stroller), it has been extensively worn with other lounge suits.

As with other hats, it largely fell out of everyday use of Western dress codes for men in the 1960s.

== Use ==
The homburg was popularised in the 1890s by the future Edward VII after he visited Bad Homburg in Hesse, Germany, and brought back a hat of this style. He was flattered when his hat style was mimicked, and at times he insisted on being copied.

Anthony Eden made the black homburg so fashionable in the 1930s that it became known as "the Anthony Eden hat" on Savile Row in London. At his 1953 inauguration, Dwight D. Eisenhower broke with tradition by wearing a black homburg instead of a top hat. He also wore a homburg at his second inauguration, a hat that took three months to craft and was dubbed the "international homburg" by hatters, since workers from ten countries participated in its making.

Like other formal Western male headgear, the homburg ceased to be as common in the 20th century as it once was. Al Pacino gained some renewed fame for the homburg by wearing a grey one in the 1972 film The Godfather, for which reason the hat is sometimes called a "Godfather". Some Orthodox Jewish rabbis wear black homburgs to the rekel, though this practice is also in decline. The homburg was always considered to be more traditional and distinguished than the fedora.

It was sometimes jocularly referred to as a "hamburger", notably by actor Edward Brophy in the 1958 film The Last Hurrah.

In Italy it is known as a Lobbia, from Cristiano Lobbia who famously was wearing one when he was assaulted.

== See also ==
- Anthony Eden hat
- Boss of the Plains
- Bowler hat
- Campaign hat
- Cap
- Fedora
- List of hat styles
- List of headgear
- Shovel hat
- Stetson
- Tyrolean hat
