= Swaine London =

British luxury brand

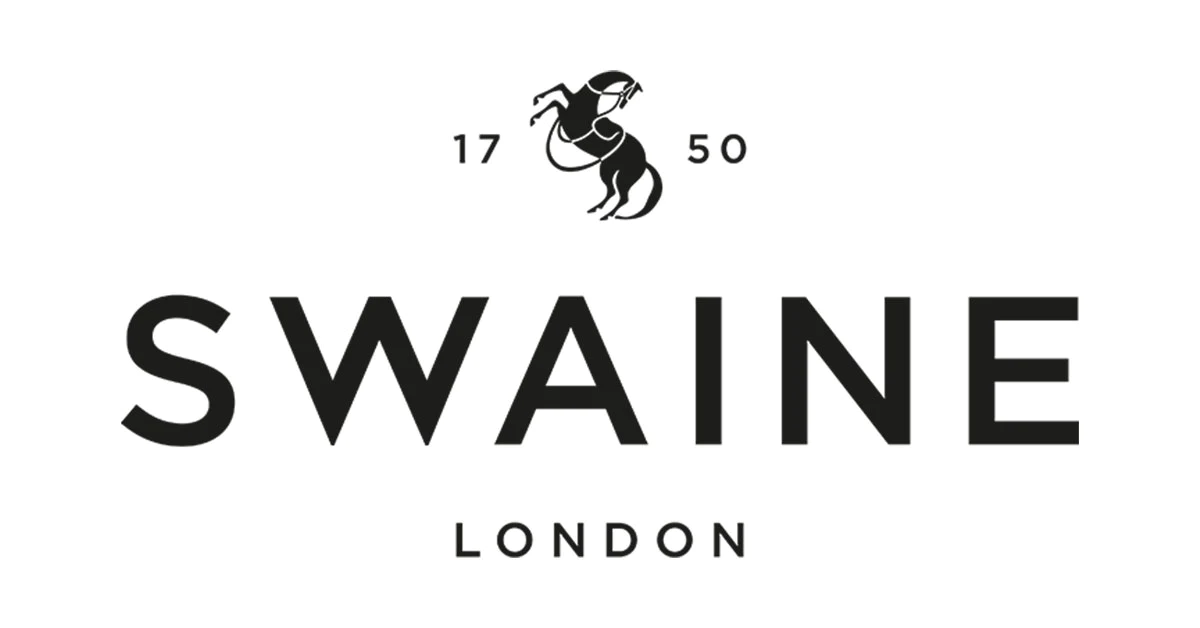
- Type: Private
- Industry: Manufacturing and retailing
- Predecessors: Swaine & Co. (1798–1825); Swaine & Isaac (c. 1825–1848); Swaine, Isaac & Adeney; Swaine & Adeney (1848–1910); Swaine & Adeney Ltd (1910–1943); Swaine, Adeney, Brigg & Sons Ltd (1943–1990) Swaine Adeney Brigg (1990–2022 )
- Founded: 1798; 228 years ago in Piccadilly, London
- Headquarters: London, W1J 0PN; United Kingdom
- Number of locations: 2
- Key people: Carine de Koenigswarte (CEO/Chairman)
- Products: Luxury leather goods, Brigg umbrellas and hats from Herbert Johnson
- Owner: Chargeurs
- Subsidiaries: Brigg; Herbert Johnson
- Website: swaine.london

Swaine London, known previously as Swaine Adeney Brigg, is a luxury goods shop that has traded in London's St James's since 1798. The shop sells leather goods, Brigg umbrellas and hats from Herbert Johnson.

== History ==
=== John Ross ===
The firm of Swaine & Adeney was said to have been founded in London in 1750, but the earliest documentary evidence goes back to around 1760 when a saddler named John Ross set up a whip manufactory in London. His first-known factory was in Marylebone Street (now incorporated in Glasshouse Street), just to the north of Piccadilly. Among his customers were Prince Henry, Duke of Cumberland and George Wyndham, 3rd Earl of Egremont. Ross's Marylebone Street premises were lost in a fire in July 1769, but by the following year he was trading at 238 Piccadilly on the south side of the street just a few doors away from the largest coaching inn, the White Bear, at No. 235.

=== Swaine & Co. (1798–1825) ===
Ross sold his business in 1798 to a whip-maker named James Swaine, who had been apprenticed to Benjamin Griffith & Co., whip-makers of High Holborn, and the firm of Swaine & Co. (James Swaine in partnership with Benjamin Slocock) carried on business from the Piccadilly address. The first Royal Warrant was granted by King George III for carriage riding whips. Ledgers show that the Prince Regent and his friends – the "Prinny's Set" – figured among the firm's customers.

Trade directories show that by 1822 the firm had moved a few doors west to 224, and an advertisement in the Morning Post announced a further change of address in 1835 to "more eligible" premises at No. 185, next door to Fortnum & Mason's.

=== Swaine & Isaac (c. 1825–1848) ===
Not long after Slocock's retirement in 1825, James Swaine invited William Isaac to become a partner, which role he assumed from at least 1829 to 1848. After George IV's death in 1830, Swaine & Isaac were re-appointed as whip-makers to his brother William IV and in 1837 to the new queen, Victoria. James Swaine left his business to his son Edward. By 1845, the firm of Swaine & Isaac had branched out into the sale of walking sticks of fine quality.

=== Swaine & Adeney (1848–1910) ===
In 1845, some three years before William Isaac resigned, Edward Swaine took into partnership his nephew and son-in-law James Adeney, who had served a seven-year apprenticeship with him. For a short time the firm was known as Swaine, Isaac & Adeney, and then for almost a hundred years, from 1848 to 1943, the firm bore the name Swaine & Adeney, becoming Swaine & Adeney Ltd on incorporation in 1910.

The sporting press in March 1863 reported the appointment of Swaine & Adeney as whip-manufacturers to Albert Edward, Prince of Wales. The patronage of the Prince of Wales helped determine the firm's future direction. As the growing railway network ate into the demand for coaching whips, the firm welcomed the opportunity to build custom among the hunting and racing community for whom the Prince of Wales stood out as the royal figurehead.

New opportunities were found in meeting the new and growing market for polo equipment, including mallets and polo whips.

With the advent of the motor car, or "horseless carriage" as it was called, Swaine & Adeney turned to the manufacture of luggage sets as luxury motoring accessories. When the firm took over Köhler & Son, the London makers of coaching and post horns in 1907, the new focus of the subsidiary was hunting horns and part of Swaine & Adeney's strategy was clearly to consolidate its position as suppliers of hunting equipment.

=== Swaine & Adeney Ltd (1910–1943) ===
When Swaine & Adeney were registered as a limited company, Edward Swaine Adeney Jr was named as the managing director. He was to remain at the helm of the firm until his retirement in 1949. It was thanks to his commitment and passion that the firm was able to survive in challenging times. He first registered the maker's mark of ESA with the London Assay Office in 1902 and thenceforth the silver and gold collars of the firm's whips and sticks were stamped with this mark.

During the First World War, the firm produced a range of "War Equipment", including kit items made to War Office specifications. In 1927 Swaine & Adeney bought out G. & J. Zair Ltd of Birmingham, the firm's biggest rivals in the field of whip-making.

That same year Edward Swaine Adeney brought out a booklet extolling the virtues of handcraftsmanship. "This, then, is the formula," he wrote: "honest material and the finest craftsmanship that can be put into the moulding of it."

Also in 1927, Edward patented a new polo stick head, followed by a stronger stick in 1928.

In the 1920s and 1930s the firm greatly expanded its range of handcrafted umbrellas. These used frames made by Samuel Fox of Stocksbridge. A range of animal heads carved in wood was made available for both umbrellas and walking sticks. Many of the heads were made by members of the Czilinsky family over several generations.

In February 1943, Swaine & Adeney on Piccadilly and Thomas Brigg & Sons, umbrella-makers, round the corner at 23 St James's Street decided to join forces. From 1943 until 1990 the company traded as Swaine, Adeney, Brigg & Sons Ltd, with Edward Swaine Adeney Jr appointed chairman for life. Brigg's gave up its shop on St James's Street but kept its manufactory for sticks and umbrellas at Newbury Street in the City of London. Whips and other leather goods continued to be made at the Piccadilly shop and at Zair's factory in Birmingham.

=== Swaine, Adeney, Brigg & Sons Ltd (1943–1990) ===
When Edward Swaine Adeney retired in 1949 he was succeeded briefly by Bertie Walter Brigg, and then from 1950 by Edward's only son Gilbert Latimer Adeney.

The firm continued to prize good design but embraced the use of new technologies and of some new materials. Nylon fabric replaced the hand-woven silk for the canopies of some umbrellas and at Zair's factory nylon increasingly replaced rare whalebone for the core of many whips made under the trade-mark "Sabson".

For Terence Young's film From Russia with Love (1963), Swaine Adeney Brigg made James Bond's briefcase, faithful to Ian Fleming's original 1957 novel: "Q Branch had put together this smart-looking bag, ripping out the careful handiwork of Swaine and Adeney".

For the 1961 British television series The Avengers Swaine Adeney Brigg made a custom Whangee umbrella featuring a sword hidden in the shaft.

Gilbert's son Robert Edward John Adeney, who became chairman on Gilbert's retirement, was to be the last of the family to run the firm. With the expiry of Zair's factory lease in 1965, and the compulsory purchase of the factory in Newbury Street in London, Robert decided to consolidate all the company's manufacturing at one site in School Street at Great Chesterford, Essex.

In the 1980s the firm decided to open an American branch in San Francisco to meet the growing demand from America and contain the risk of currency fluctuations between the pound and the US dollar. The experiment was not successful and the San Francisco shop was surrendered.

The attempted expansion overseas coincided with the opportunity to acquire the lease on the shop next door at 186 Piccadilly, affording the firm a wonderful double frontage on Piccadilly. However, the firm overreached itself, moving too far away from its core strengths, and nearly collapsed. The firm found some financial relief when the Japanese conglomerate Fukuske Corporation paid £750,000 for a 20 per cent stake in the company.

A Swaine & Adeney shop was opened in 1989 in the fashionable Jingumae in the Shibuya ward, Tokyo.

That same year, Robert sold the firm's freehold factory at Great Chesterford and built a new 10,000 square foot factory nearby.

Although Robert had nursed the firm back into trading with a small profit, he and the Adeney and Brigg family shareholders decided in the summer of 1990 to sell their 80 per cent stake in the company for a reported £4 to £5 million. The new controlling shareholder was the Ensign Trust, the investment arm of the Merchant Navy Pension Fund.

=== Swaine Adeney Brigg (1990–2022) ===
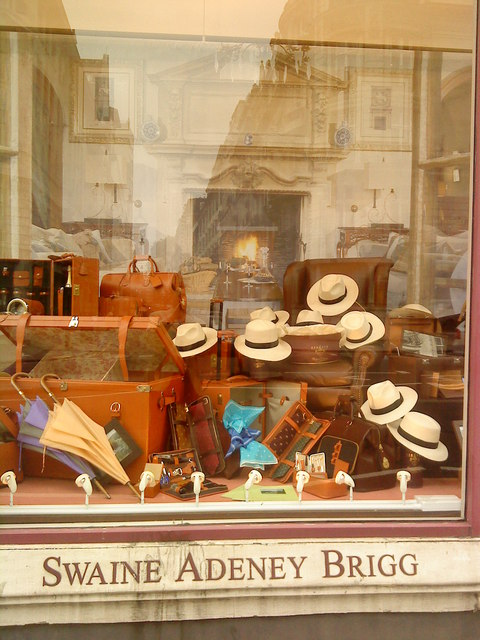
A window display at Swaine Adeney Brigg's St. James's Street shop in 2010

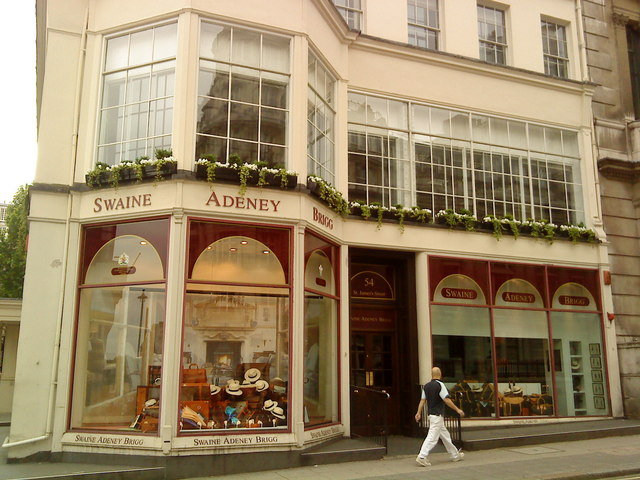
The shop at 54 St. James's Street in 2010

The company was reincorporated as Pictology Ltd, but continued to trade as Swaine Adeney Brigg. The financial challenges were not over, however, for the firm was running at annual losses of more than £3 million even as it went through various chairmanships. First came Anthony Tryon, 3rd Baron Tryon as successor to Robert Adeney; he was followed by Rohan Courtney in 1993–4; and then John de Bruyne, the Cambridge entrepreneur, who had grand ideas of making the company into a British Hermès or Gucci. De Bruyne achieved big savings by moving the shop from Piccadilly to cheaper premises in Old Bond Street. A further move took place in 1998 when the shop opened at 54 St James's Street, not far from where Brigg's old shop at No. 23 had been.

The period of de Bruyne's chairmanship was not without success. Swaine Adeney Brigg bought Herbert Johnson, the venerable firm of hatters of 38 New Bond Street in 1996. By that year the firm was making 2,500 briefcases a year; this was to be augmented with the acquisition of the luggage-making division of Papworth Industries, the manufacturing arm of Papworth Village Settlement near Cambridge in 1997. De Bruyne closed down the Great Chesterford factory and set up a new factory at Bar Hill to the north of Cambridge.

In 2003 the firm again changed hands, being sold to the Birmingham company Harris Watson Holdings PLC. Then in 2009, Roger Gawn, a Norfolk businessman bought the company.

In Good Hands: 250 Years of Craftsmanship at Swaine Adeney Brigg by Katherine Prior

In a return to the line of business of the firm's founding fathers, Swaine Adeney Brigg made six postilion whips for the wedding of the Duke of Cambridge to Miss Catherine Middleton in 2011.

With the lease expiry on 54 St James's Street, Swaine Adeney Brigg moved to 7 Piccadilly Arcade, off Piccadilly. Its Cambridge store, which opened in 2015, ceased trading on 20 May 2018.

With the onset of the global COVID-19 pandemic, the Swaine group (including Swaine Adeney Brigg) was sold to French Chargeurs Group.

=== Swaine London (2022–) ===
The store at No. 7 Piccadilly Arcade was closed in May 2022 and the brand relocated opening a store at the Burlington Arcade in Mayfair. The move was done to help modernise the brand and with it the brand was rebranded to Swaine London. Along with these changes a new factory opened in Sawston, Cambridgeshire and production was now housed under one roof for the first time in decades.

In March 2023 the brand opened a new flagship store at 127 New Bond Street, London. The flagship location is 7,000 square feet (650 m^{2}) and with the brands workshops located in the same building above the store along with the Herbert Johnson workshops.

== Other firms within the group ==
- J. Köhler & Son, London (acquired in February 1907)
- G. & J. Zair Ltd, Birmingham (acquired in 1927)
- Thomas Brigg & Sons, London (merged with Swaine Adeney Brigg in February 1943)
- Herbert Johnson, hatters of New Bond Street, London (acquired in 1996)
- Papworth Industries (leather goods division) and Pendragon, Papworth, Cambridgeshire (acquired in 1997)

== Awards at world's fairs ==
- 1851 Great Exhibition, London: Swaine & Adeney awarded a first prize in the Leather section for "a large assortment of Whips and Canes"
- 1851 Great Exhibition, London: Köhler (bought by Swaine & Adeney in 1907) awarded prize medal
- 1862 International Exhibition, London: Köhler awarded prize medal
- 1879 Sydney International Exhibition: The firm G. & J. Zair (bought by Swaine & Adeney Ltd in 1927) wins first special prize for its whips
- 1880 Melbourne International Exhibition: The firm G. & J. Zair wins first prize for its whips
- 1900 Exposition universelle, Paris: Swaine & Adeney wins Grand Prix
- 1908 Franco-British Exhibition, London: The firm Thomas Brigg & Sons (merged with Swaine & Adeney Ltd in 1943) wins the Grand Prix for umbrellas
