= 1906 in France =

- Decades: 1880s; 1890s; 1900s; 1910s; 1920s
- See also: History of France; Timeline of French history; List of years in France

Events from the year 1906 in France.

== Incumbents ==
- President: Émile Loubet (until 18 February), Armand Fallières (starting 18 February)
- President of the Council of Ministers:
  - until 7 March: Maurice Rouvier
  - 12 March – 20 October: Ferdinand Sarrien
  - starting 25 October: Georges Clemenceau

== Events ==
- 16 January - Algeciras Conference begins, to mediate the First Moroccan Crisis between France and Germany.
- 10 March - Courrières mine disaster: Explosion in coal mine in Courrières kills 1099.
- 7 April - Final agreement from Algeciras Conference is signed.
- 6 May - Legislative Election held.
- 20 May - Legislative Election held.
- June - First Paris motor bus line opened by C.G.O. (Compagnie Générale des Omnibus).
- 12 July - Alfred Dreyfus, the Jewish army officer hastily and wrongly convicted of treason in 1899, is exonerated.
- 21 July - Dreyfus is reinstalled in the French Army 21 July, ending the Dreyfus Affair.
- 23 October - Santos-Dumont 14-bis aircraft performs the first publicly witnessed European unaided take-off by a heavier-than-air aircraft, in Bagatelle.

== Art ==
- Leonetto Cappiello - Maurin Quina
- André Derain - Le Bassin de Londres
- Albert Marquet - Le Sergent de la coloniale
- Henri Matisse
  - Le bonheur de vivre
  - Marguerite lisant
  - Les Tapis rouges
  - Autoportrait
  - Le Jeune Marin II
- Jean Metzinger
  - Coucher de soleil no. 1
  - La danse, Bacchante
  - Baigneuses: Deux nus dans un paysage exotique
  - Femme au Chapeau
- Pablo Picasso
  - Jeune garçon au cheval
  - Portrait de Gertrude Stein

== Literature ==
- Arnould Galopin - Doctor Omega

== Music ==
- Isaac Albéniz - Iberia, Livre 1
- Claude Debussy - Images, 1re série
- Georges Enesco
  - Légende
  - Decet
- Gabriel Fauré
  - Le don silencieux
  - Piano Quintet No. 1
  - Barcarolle No. 7
  - Impromptu No. 4
- Jules Massenet - Ariane
- Giacomo Puccini - Madame Butterfly (French-language version)
- Maurice Ravel
  - Miroirs
  - Introduction et Allegro
  - Manteau de fleurs
- Camille Saint-Saëns
  - L'ancêtre
  - La gloire de Corneille
  - Le fleuve
- Edgard Varèse - Un grand sommeil noir

== Sport ==
- 26–27 June - 1906 French Grand Prix at Le Mans; French cars take the major prizes.
- 4 July - Tour de France begins.
- 29 July - Tour de France ends, won by René Pottier.

== Births ==
=== January to June ===
- 5 January – Pierre Seghers, poet and editor (died 1987)
- 21 February – Jeanne Aubert, singer and actress (died 1988)
- 8 March – Louis Peglion, cyclist (died 1986)
- 9 March – Joseph Mauclair, cyclist (died 1990)
- 18 March – Paul Rassinier, pacifist, political activist and author (died 1967)
- 25 March – Jean Sablon, singer and actor (died 1994)
- 26 March – Henri Cadiou, painter and lithographer (died 1989)
- 27 March – Bernard Lefebvre, photographer (died 1992)
- 2 April – Maurice Thiriet, composer (died 1972)
- 6 May – André Weil, mathematician (died 1998)
- 22 May – Paul Badré, aircraft pilot and engineer (died 2000)
- 3 June – Josephine Baker, American-born French dancer, singer and actress (died 1975)
- 7 June – Alexandre Renard, Roman Catholic Cardinal (died 1983)
- 24 June – Pierre Fournier, cellist (died 1986)

=== July to September ===
- 1 July - Jean Dieudonné, mathematician (died 1992)
- 2 July - Séra Martin, middle-distance Olympic runner (died 1993)
- 6 July - Colette Audry, novelist, screenwriter and critic (died 1990)
- 7 July - Charles Vaurie, ornithologist (died 1975)
- 27 July - Roger Duchesne, actor (died 1996)
- 30 July - Alex Thépot, international soccer player (died 1989)
- 18 August - Marcel Carné, film director (died 1996)
- 6 September - Luis Federico Leloir, physician and biochemist, recipient of 1970 Nobel Prize in Chemistry (died 1987)
- 12 September - Jacques Lacarrière, ice hockey player (died 2005)
- 30 September - Mireille Hartuch, singer, composer and actress (died 1996)

=== October to December ===
- 3 October - Raymond Triboulet, resistance fighter and politician (died 2006)
- 22 October - Marcel Ichac, alpinist, explorer, photographer and film director (died 1994)
- 7 November
  - Jean Leray, mathematician (died 1998)
  - Pierre Magne, cyclist (died 1980)
- 14 November - Claude Ménard, field athlete, Olympic medallist (died 1980)
- 19 November - Jacques Leguerney, composer (died 1997)
- 16 November - Henri Charrière, convicted felon and author (died 1973)
- 10 December - Jules Ladoumègue, athlete and Olympic medallist (died 1973)
- 18 December - Ferdinand Alquié, philosopher (died 1985)
- 27 December - Andreas Feininger, French-born German-American photographer (died 1999)

== Deaths ==
- 1 April - Léon Fairmaire, entomologist (born 1820)
- 18 April - Louis Gustave Vapereau, writer and lexicographer (born 1819)
- 19 April - Pierre Curie, physicist, shared the 1903 Nobel Prize in physics, in road accident (born 1859)
- 5 July - Jules Adolphe Aimé Louis Breton, painter (born 1827)
- 26 August - Victor, 5th duc de Broglie, aristocrat (born 1846)
- 18 October - Léon Gastinel, composer (born 1813)
- 22 October - Paul Cézanne, painter (born 1839)
- 5 September - Albert Tissandier, architect, aviator, illustrator, editor and archaeologist (born 1839)
- 9 December - Ferdinand Brunetière, writer and critic (born 1849)

== See also ==
- List of French films before 1910
