= Revel =

Revel may refer to:

== Brands and enterprises ==
- Revel (brand), a French brand from the 1920s
- Parapluie Revel, a French umbrella from the 1920s
- Revel Atlantic City, a former resort and casino in New Jersey
- Revel Audio, a loudspeaker company owned by Harman International
- Revel Transit, a moped-sharing company

== Places ==
- Revel, Haute-Garonne, a commune in south-western France
- Revel, Isère, a commune in south-eastern France
- Revel-Tourdan, a commune in the Isère département in south-eastern France
- Reval or sometimes Revel, the historical name of Tallinn, the capital city of Estonia
- Revello or Revel, Piemont

== Other uses ==
- Revel (album), an album by the Pat McGee Band
- Port Revel, a French maritime pilotage school
- Revel bun, a saffron bun
- Red River Revel, an annual US festival of food, culture, art, and music

== People with the surname ==
- Bernard Revel (1885–1940), rabbi and the first president of Yeshiva University
- Christophe Revel (born 1979), French former goalkeeper and now goalkeeping coach
- Gabriel Revel (1643-1712), French painter
- Harry Revel (1905–1958), English composer
- Jacques Revel (1942–2026), French historian
- Jean-François Revel (1924–2006), French intellectual, author of Anti-Americanism
- Sandrine Revel (born 1969), French comics illustrator and author
- Shavon Revel (born 2001), American football player

== People with the given name ==
- Craig Revel Horwood (born 1965), Australian-British dancer, choreographer & theatre director

== See also ==
- Bernard Revel Graduate School of Jewish Studies at Yeshiva University
- Revell, a plastic models manufacturer
- Revels (disambiguation)
- The Revelers, an American quintet
