= Grandi Magazzini Mele =

Former Italian department store chain

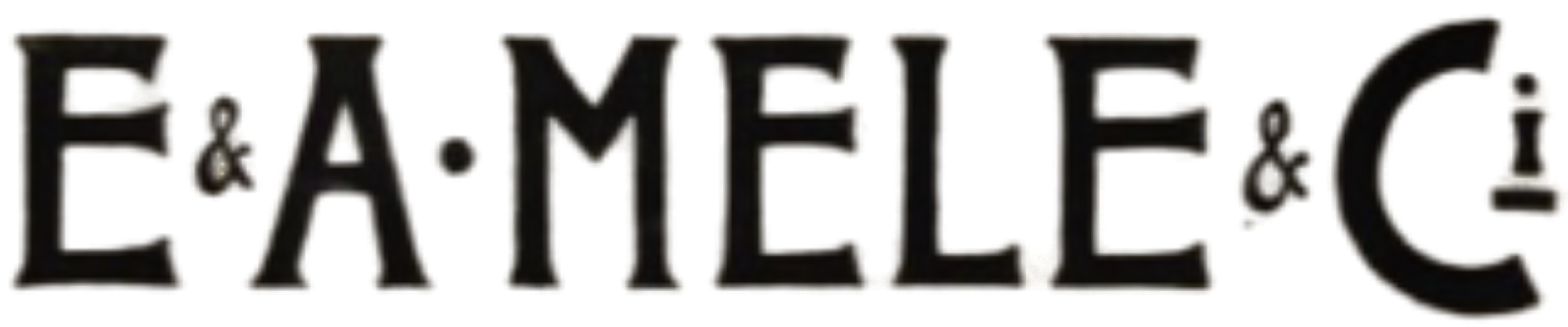

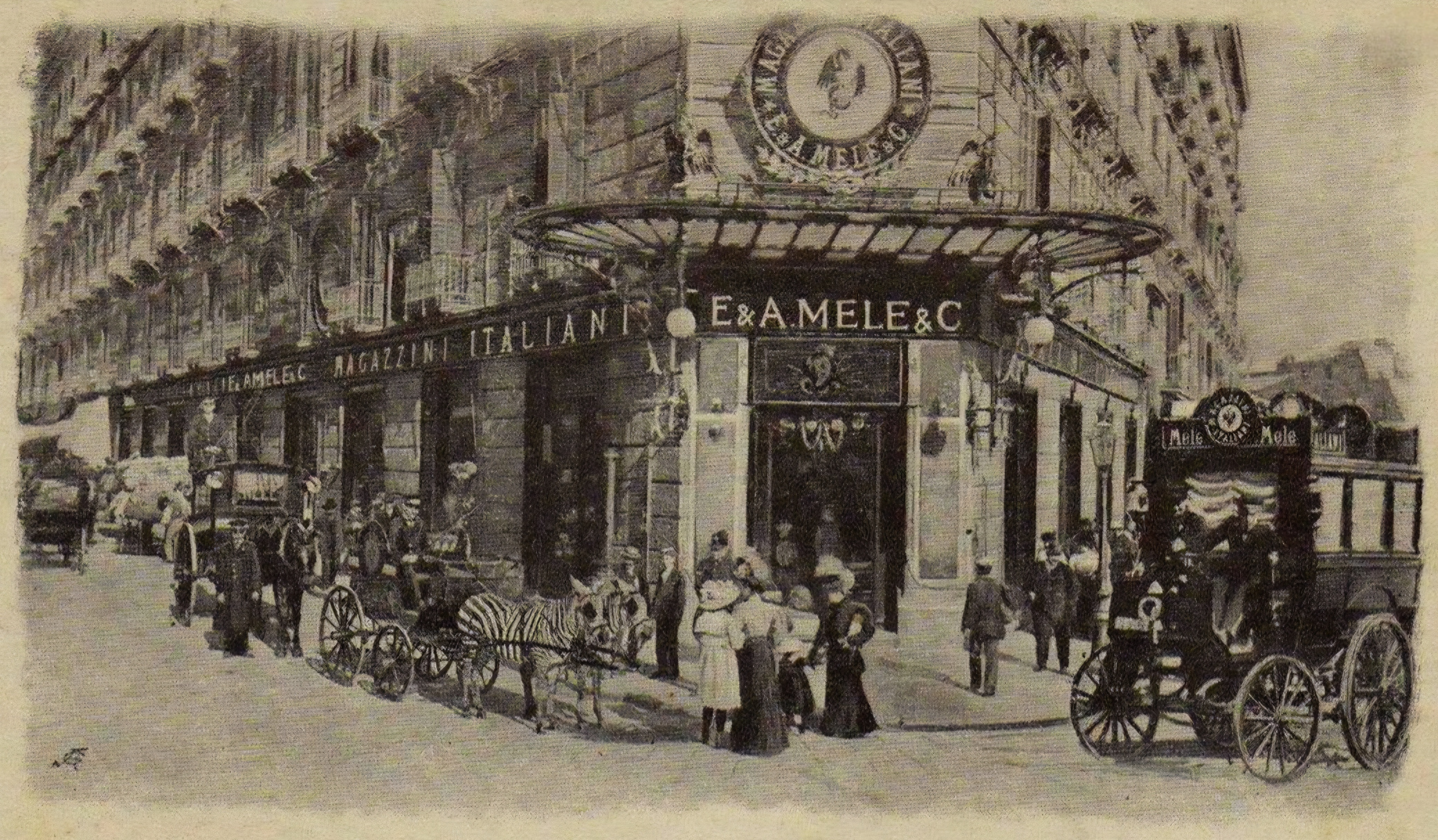
- The Grandi Magazzini Mele in Naples in the early 1900s
- Industry: Retailer
- Founded: Naples, Italy (1889)
- Headquarters: Naples, Italy
- Key people: Emiddio Mele; Alfonso Mele
- Products: Clothing, household items, furniture
- Number of employees: 300

The Grandi Magazzini Italiani E. & A. Mele & C. was a high-end Italian department store chain based in Naples.

== Biography ==
The Grandi Magazzini Mele were founded by the cousins Emiddio and Alfonso Mele. The Mele cousins were wealthy landowners active in commerce. They travelled to major European cities, particularly Berlin, London and Paris, for both pleasure and business. There, they discovered the innovative concept of large-scale retailing, exemplified by stores such as Harrods in London (established 1849) and Le Bon Marché in Paris (established 1858). Following news from Milan that the brothers Luigi and Ferdinando Bocconi had transformed their ready-made clothing store into a large Italian clothing store called Alle Città d'Italia (later known as La Rinascente) in 1877, they decided to bring the concept to Naples.

Thanks to funding for the city's redevelopment, the Mele family purchased a 2,000-square-metre, two-storey property in the newly built Palazzo della Borghesia on Via San Carlo. The 'Grandi Magazzini Italiani di Napoli' (Italian Department Stores of Naples) was the first department store in Italy to carry this name. Unlike its Milanese contemporary, which focused primarily on mid- to high-end clothing due to its ties to the textile industry of the Bocconi family, the "Grandi Magazzini Italiani di Napoli" offered a diverse range of products from the outset, including clothing, furnishings, personal care products, cosmetics, trousseaus, curtains and everyday mechanical products. The interior and window displays were designed with the same attention to detail as the advertising posters, which were created by the greatest Italian graphic designers of the time, including Marcello Dudovich and Leopoldo Metlicovitz. The inauguration, which took place on 5 October 1889 in the presence of all the highest local authorities, was met with resounding public success.

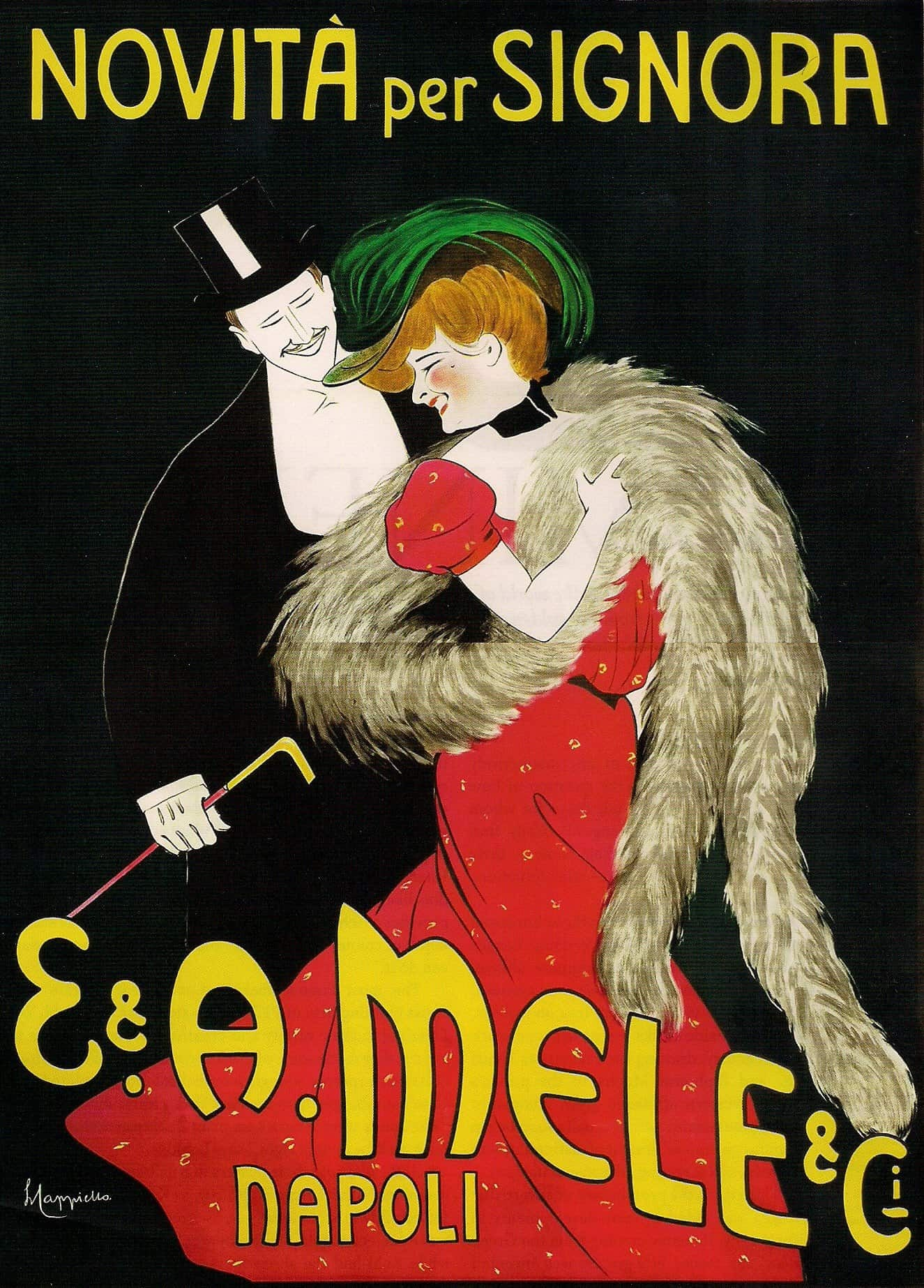
Advertising poster of Grandi Magazzini Mele by Leonetto Cappiello, 1903

In the clothing segment alone, the range included the latest fashion trends and classic styles for children, young people and women, as well as high-quality hats, boaters, gloves, fans, umbrellas and walking sticks, and shoes to suit all tastes and styles. Prices were commensurate with the quality of the goods, but never prohibitively high compared to those in Milan and abroad. The company gained such popularity that Emiddio found himself unknowingly nominated for the city council in the 1904 local elections. He declined the nomination in a letter to the newspaper Il Giorno, thanking those who had considered him and stating that he would not be directly involved in political or administrative movements. However, he did agree to be among the first six knights appointed to the Order of Merit for Labour in 1902.

The Mele cousins dedicated their entire lives to the Grandi Magazzini Nazionali, whose success declined following Emiddio's death in 1928. Under Davide Mele's management, the company — which employed over 300 people that year — began to decline. The global economic crisis of 1929 and its consequences in the early 1930s were the final blow for a company already in crisis due to the Great Depression. Grandi Magazzini Italiani Mele closed in September 1932.

=== Grandi Magazzini Mele and art ===
To promote their chain of stores, the Mele brothers commissioned several prominent Italian Liberty-style graphic artists to create advertising posters. This privileged relationship with art has been confirmed over time and has led the company to collaborate with Achille Beltrame, Marcello Dudovich, Leopoldo Metlicovitz, Gian Emilio Malerba, Leonetto Cappiello, Franz Laskoff and Aleardo Villa. Today, the antique Grandi Magazzini Mele advertising posters are collector items. The Museo di Capodimonte houses a permanent exhibition of Mele's advertising posters.

== Bibliography ==
- Bernabò Silorata, Donatella (18 March 2016). "Le imprese di successo a Napoli al tempo della Bella Epoque: la storia dei Magazzini Mele". La Repubblica.
- Mele, Francesca (2017). I Grandi Magazzini Mele. A Department Store in Naples During la Belle Époque. Naples: Artem. ISBN 978-8856905670.
- Merone, Anna Paola (14 October 2025). "Le imprese di successo a Napoli al tempo della Bella Epoque: la storia dei Magazzini Mele". Corriere del Mezzogiorno.
