= Revels (disambiguation) =

Revels is an American series of annual theatrical events.

Revels may also refer to:

- Revels (confectionery), a chocolate product made by Mars, Inc.
- Revels (Inns of Court), entertainments at the English Inns of Court in medieval and early modern period
- The Revels, a 1960s surf music group
- The Revels (doo-wop group), an American doo-wop group

== See also ==
- Cynthia's Revels, a 1600 Elizabethan stage play
- Master of the Revels, a position in the British royal household
- Revel (disambiguation)
- The Revelers, a male close-harmony group founded in the U.S. in 1925
