= Pool of London =

Area of the Thames

Coordinates: 51.5063°N 0.0778°W

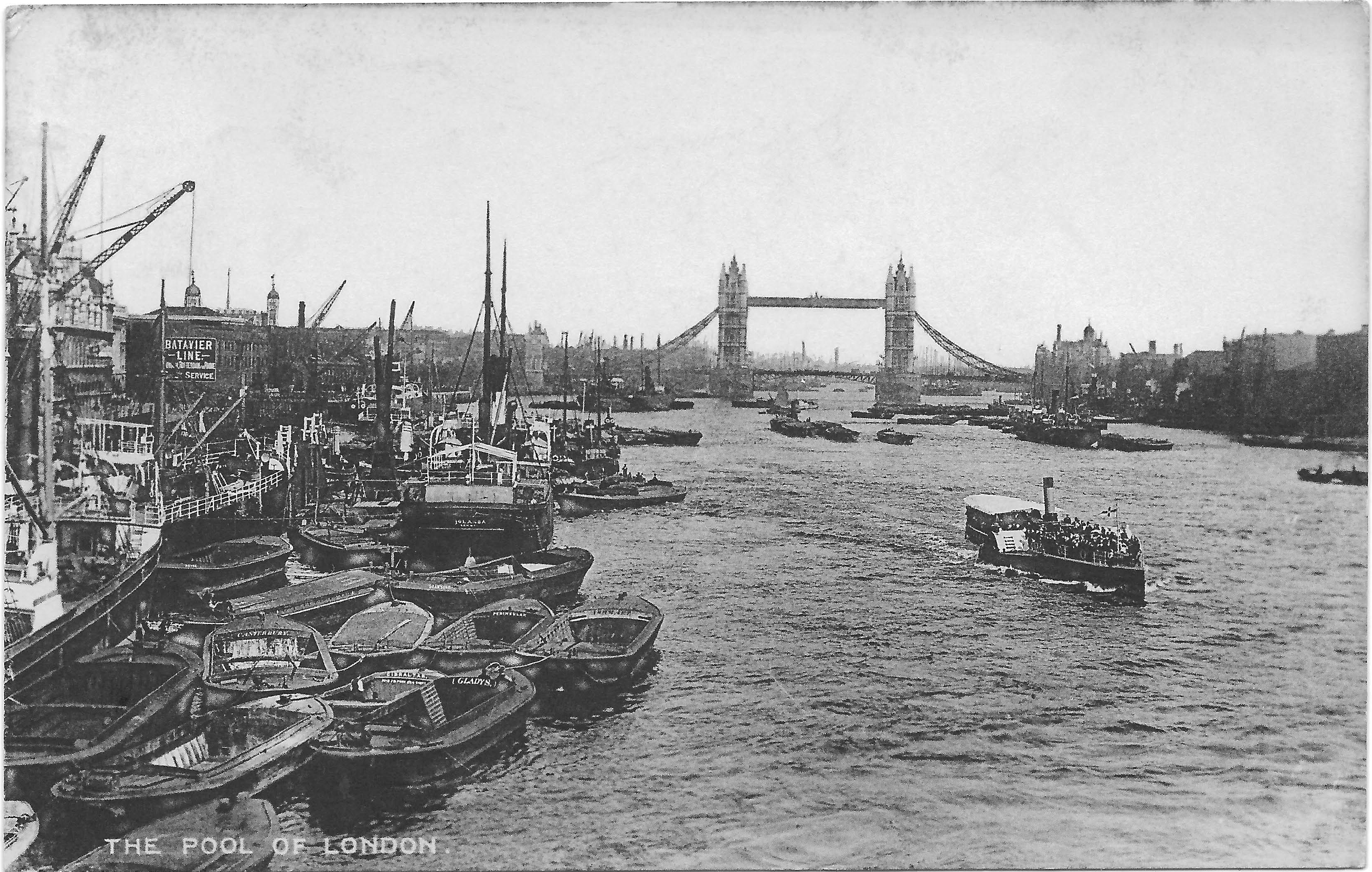
A view of the Pool of London, River Thames, around 1938

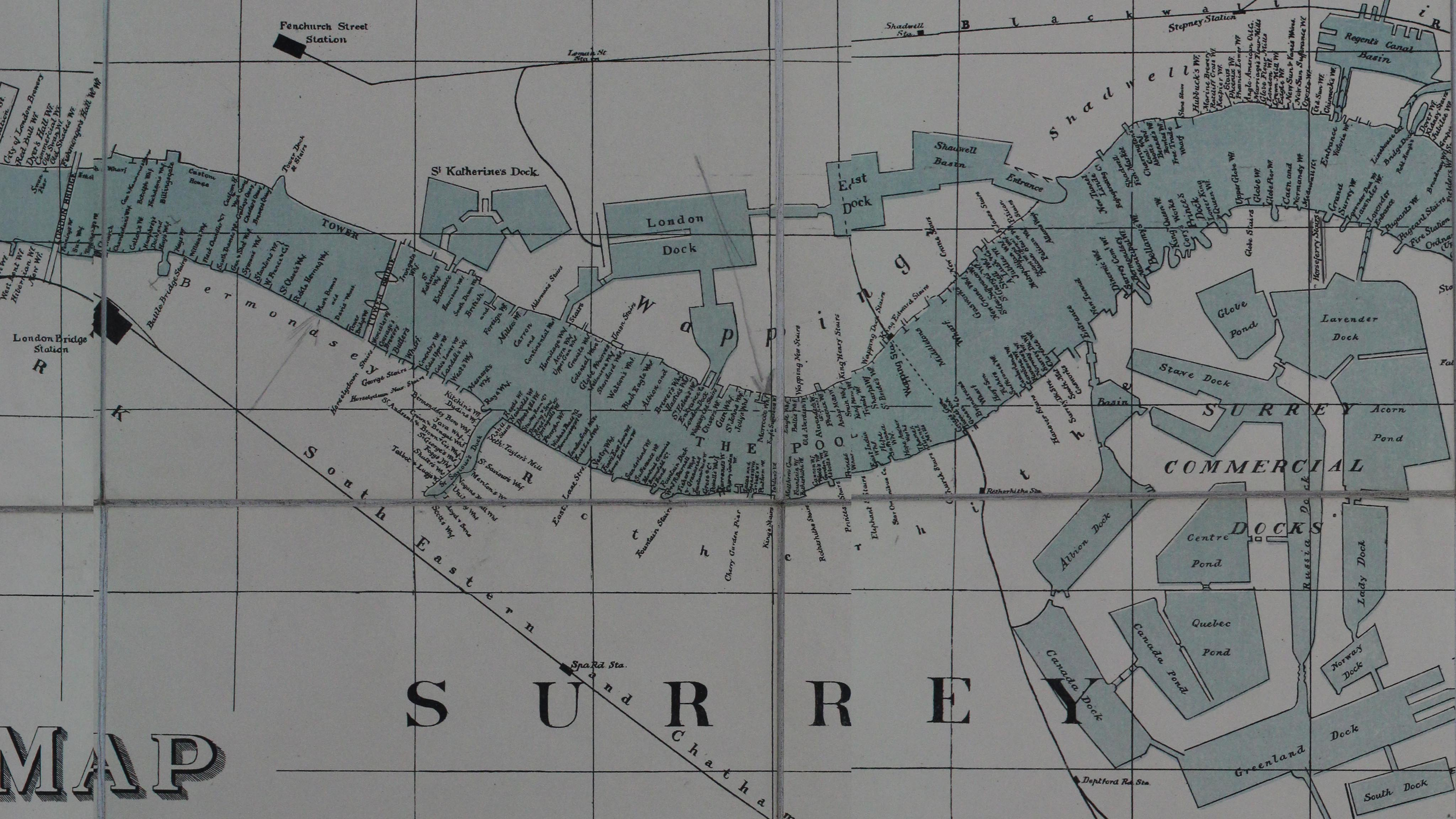
A 1905 Thames wharf map from London Bridge to Limehouse showing the Pool of London. Cherry Garden Pier at centre.

The Pool of London is a stretch of the River Thames from London Bridge to below Limehouse.

Part of the Tideway of the Thames, the Pool was navigable by tall-masted vessels bringing coastal and later overseas goods—the wharves there were the original part of the Port of London. The Pool of London is divided into two parts, the Upper Pool and the Lower Pool. The Upper Pool consists of the section between London Bridge, which blocked tall-masts from continuing west, and the Cherry Garden Pier in Bermondsey. The Lower Pool runs from the Cherry Garden Pier to Limekiln Creek.

== History ==
The Pool of London was originally the stretch of the River Thames along Billingsgate on the south side of the City of London where all imported cargoes had to be delivered for inspection and assessment by Customs Officers, giving the area the name of "Legal Quays". Smuggling, theft and pilferage of cargoes were rife, both on the busy open wharves and in the crowded warehouses. The term was later used more generally to refer to the stretch of the river from Rotherhithe upriver to London Bridge, with the venerable bridge being the furthest reach that could be navigated by a tall-masted vessel.

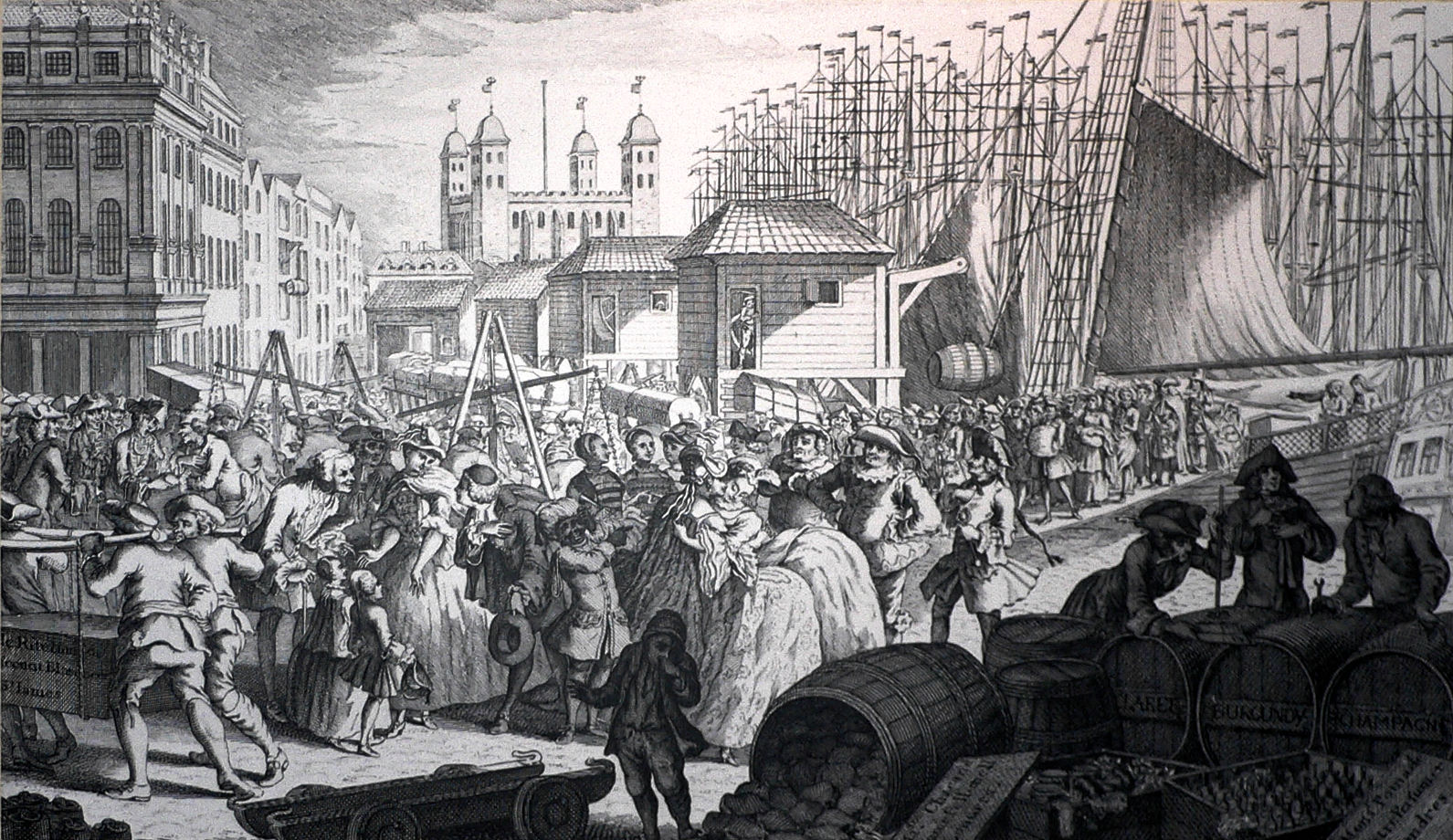
Legal Quays in 1757, by Louis Peter Boitard

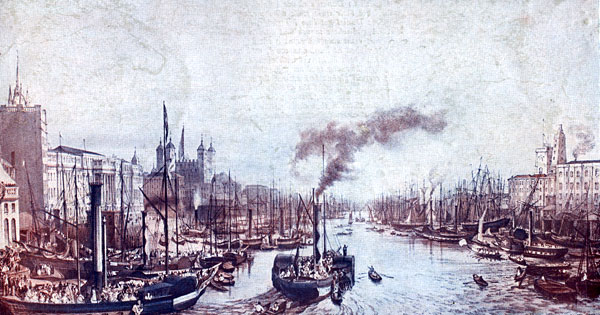
A view of the Pool of London, River Thames, 1841

The Pool of London was of vital importance to the capital for centuries – as early as the 7th century Bede wrote that it was the reason for London's existence – but it reached its peak in the 18th and 19th centuries. By this time the river was lined with nearly-continuous walls of wharves running for miles along both banks, and hundreds of ships moored in the river or beside the quays.

The Pool of London saw a large increase in both overseas and coastal trade in the second half of the 18th century. Two-thirds of coastal vessels using it were colliers meeting an increase in the demand for coal as the population of London rose. Coastal trade virtually doubled between 1750 and 1796 reaching 11,964 vessels in 1795. In overseas trade in 1751, the Pool of London handled 1,682 ships and 234,639 tons of goods, but by 1794, this had risen to 3,663 ships and 620,845 tons.

The congestion was so extreme that it was said to be possible to walk across the Thames simply by stepping from ship to ship. London's Docklands had their origins in the lack of capacity in the Pool of London which particularly affected the West India trade. The West India Dock Act 1799 allowed a new off-river dock to be built for produce from the West Indies and the rest of Docklands followed as landowners built enclosed docks with better security and facilities than the Pool's wharves.

Even after the construction of off-river docks, the Pool of London remained an important part of the Port of London. Shipping needed unrestricted access to the Pool of London which imposed constraints on the crossings that became increasingly necessary with the commercial development on both sides of the river. The Thames Tunnel from Rotherhithe to Wapping was constructed between 1825 and 1843. Tower Bridge opened in 1894 as a bascule bridge. In 1909, the Pool came under the jurisdiction of the Port of London Authority. The docks thrived up until the 1950s, despite suffering severe bomb damage during the Second World War.

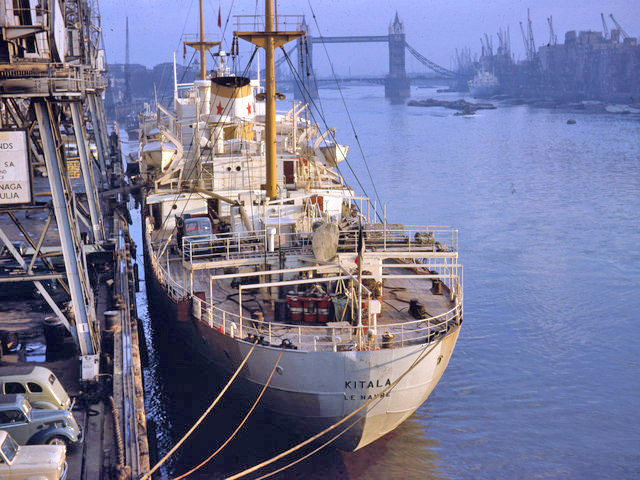
A ship unloading in 1962

The abrupt collapse of commercial traffic in the Thames due to the introduction of shipping containers and coastal deep-water ports in the 1960s emptied the Pool and led to all of the wharves being closed down, and many being demolished. The area was extensively redeveloped in the 1980s and 1990s to create new residential and commercial neighbourhoods.

== Urban renewal ==
In 1996, an organisation - the Pool of London Partnership - was established to help promote urban renewal of the areas north and south of the river. It also extended its remit slightly further eastwards to include the docks and wharves of St Katharine Docks and Shad Thames. After a decade of regeneration and an investment of approximately £100m, the Pool of London Partnership was due to dissolve in March 2007 with its work to be partially continued by three new organisations: Team London Bridge, the Potters Fields Park Management Trust and the Tower Hill Management Group.

The 'core area' includes Borough Market, London Bridge, Guy's Hospital, London Bridge station, Hay's Galleria, HMS Belfast, City Hall, Shad Thames, Tower Bridge, St Katharine Docks, the Tower of London, Tower Hill Underground station and the Monument to the Great Fire of London.

== Cultural references ==
André Derain painted four works of the Thames, and his 1906 The Pool of London is in the UK Tate collection. Derain was a leading Fauvist and had been sent to London by his dealer to produce Thames views in the Fauvist style.

A British film, Pool of London (1951), is a crime drama set within the Pool. The film was directed by Basil Dearden, and features actors Earl Cameron, Susan Shaw, Joan Dowling, and Bonar Colleano, and comic actors Leslie Phillips, Alfie Bass and James Robertson Justice. The Pool has also been featured as a location in various other films.

Patrick O'Brian refers to the Pool of London in his novels The Commodore and Blue at the Mizzen, both in the Aubrey-Maturin series.

Neal Stephenson mentions various locations around the Pool of London in his novel The System of the World, the third book in The Baroque Cycle.

== See also ==
- Safeguarded wharf
