= Marguerite Reading =

Painting by Henri Matisse

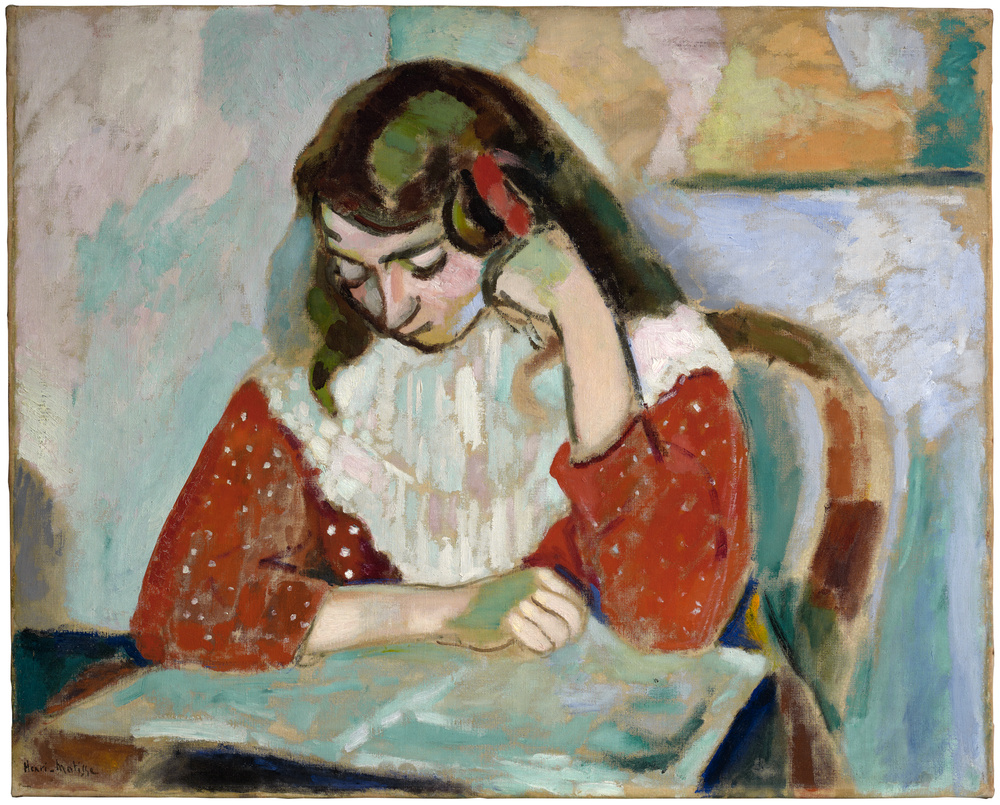

Marguerite Reading (French - Marguerite lisant or The Reader (La Liseuse) is a 1906 oil on canvas painting by Henri Matisse of his daughter Marguerite, then aged 12. It was exhibited at the 1906 autumn salon, bought by Marcel Sembat (who saw in it "the light of Velasquez"). It is now in the Museum of Grenoble after being left to it as part of Sembat and his wife Georgette Agutte's collections in 1923.

== See also ==
- List of works by Henri Matisse
