= Sergeant of the Colonial Regiment =

Painting by Albert Marquet

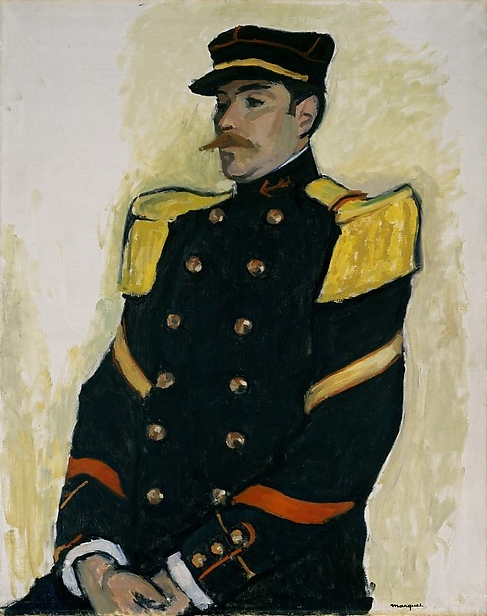
- Artist: Albert Marquet
- Year: 1906-1907
- Medium: Oil on canvas
- Dimensions: 90.2 cm × 71.1 cm (35.5 in × 28.0 in)
- Location: Metropolitan Museum of Art; New York
- Accession: 1975.1.192

Sergeant of the Colonial Regiment is an oil on canvas painting by French artist Albert Marquet, from 1906-1907. It is held in the Metropolitan Museum of Art, in New York. The painting is on view in Gallery 962.

The painting depicts an assistant to a quartermaster-corporal of the Troupes coloniales, the colonial French army. The painting has been cited as being one of Marquet's few portraits and an example of the influence of Fauvism in his early work.

In addition to the painting in the collection of the Met, a second copy of the work is on display at the Musée des Beaux-Arts, in Bordeaux.
