= Parapluie Revel =

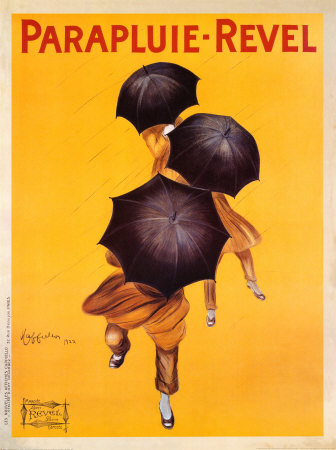

Parapluie Revel (French, Umbrella Revel) is the former leading brand of the company Revel.

In 1922, Revel engaged the famous Italian poster art designer Leonetto Cappiello to create this famous ad representing three people with umbrellas. It was published by the fine parisian printer's firm, Devambez, in the name of "Les Nouvelles Affiches Leonetto Cappiello".

== See also ==
- Boutique Bétaille
