= Leonetto Cappiello =

Italian-born French poster artist, painter, and caricaturist (1875–1942)

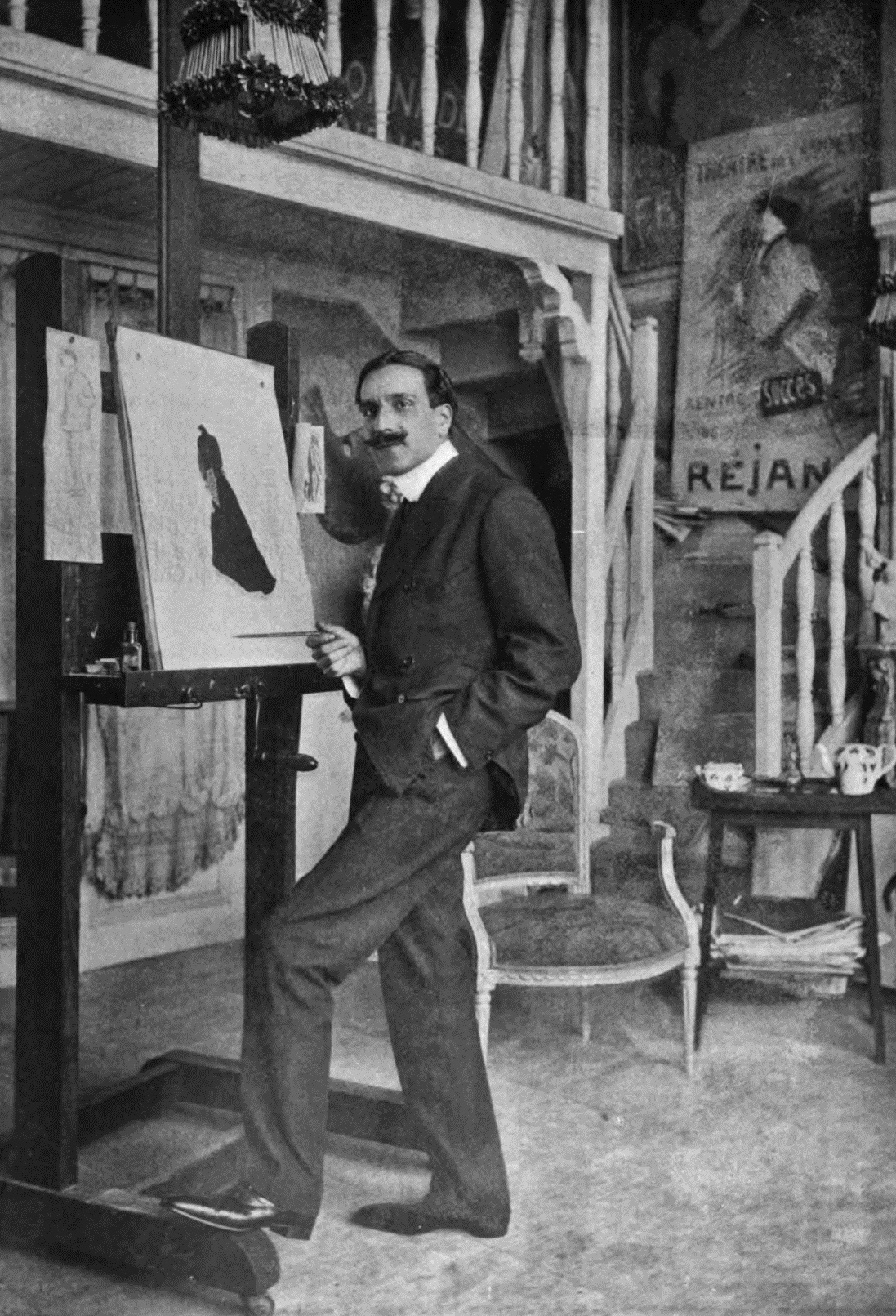
- Cappiello in his studio
- Born: 9 April 1875; Livorno, Kingdom of Italy
- Died: 2 February 1942 (aged 66); Cannes, France
- Known for: Poster art, caricature, graphic design
- Notable work: Maurin Quina, Pâtes Baroni, Bitter Campari, Parapluie Revel
- Movement: Art Deco, Liberty style

Signature
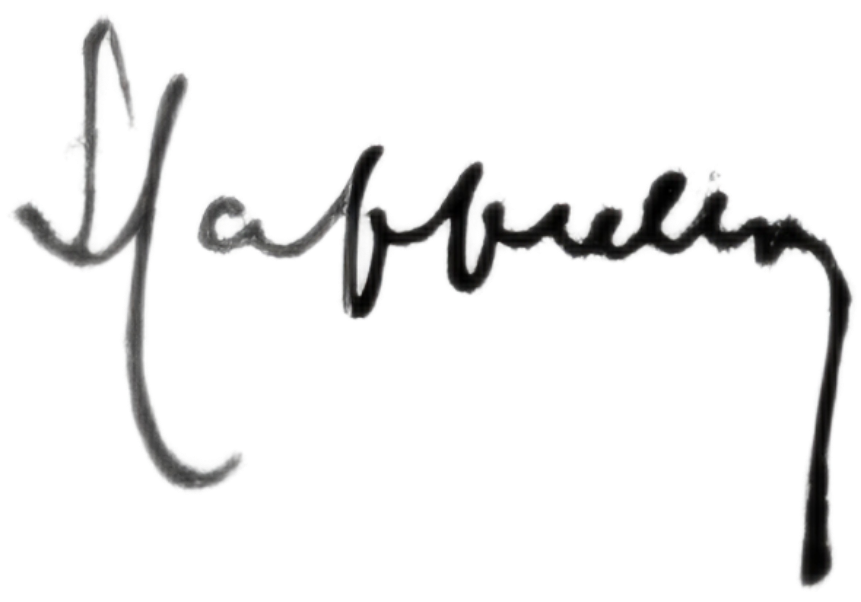

Leonetto Cappiello (9 April 1875 – 2 February 1942) was an Italian-born French poster artist, painter, and caricaturist who mainly lived and worked in Paris. Often referred to as "the father of modern advertising", Cappiello revolutionized commercial graphic design at the turn of the 20th century.

Unlike his Belle Époque predecessors—such as Jules Chéret and Alphonse Mucha, whose posters relied on intricate, painterly detail and elaborate backgrounds—Cappiello introduced a new visual formula. He isolated brightly coloured, often surreal figures against flat, dark backgrounds to create brand images designed to capture the attention of fast-moving urban viewers.

== Biography ==
=== Early life and caricatures ===
Cappiello was born in Livorno, Tuscany. He had no formal academic art training. His first exhibition took place in 1892, when a painting was displayed at the municipal museum in Florence. Several of his early works remain on display at the Museo Civico Giovanni Fattori in Livorno.

Cappiello began his career as a satirical caricaturist, gaining recognition for his published drawings in prominent Parisian and Italian journals, including Le Rire, Le Cri de Paris, Le Sourire, L'Assiette au Beurre, La Baïonnette, and Femina. His first album of caricatures, Lanterna Magica, was published in 1896. In 1898, he moved permanently to Paris, where his theatrical and society caricatures quickly made him a popular figure in artistic circles.

In 1902, a 24-page album of his caricatures was published under the title Gens du Monde ("Society People") for L'Assiette au Beurre. The following year, he published Le Théâtre de Cappiello, a special issue for Le Théâtre magazine featuring critical captions. In 1905, publisher H. Floury released 70 Dessins de Cappiello, a collection featuring black-and-white lithographs alongside hand-colored prints produced using the pochoir stencil process.

In 1901, Cappiello married Suzanne Meyer. His brother Oreste married Camille Müller, sister of the painter Alfredo Müller.

=== Career in poster design ===
==== The Vercasson period (1900–1914) ====
Cappiello's transition to poster art began in earnest in 1899 with a commission for the journal Le Frou-Frou. In 1900, he signed an exclusive contract with the French printer and publisher Pierre Vercasson. Vercasson sought to bring dynamic color to French street advertising and recognized that Cappiello's simplified visual style could offer advertisers unprecedented visual impact.

Under Vercasson, Cappiello abandoned the complex narrative backgrounds typical of late 19th-century posters. Instead, he pioneered the use of singular, exaggerated figures—often theatrical imps, dancers, or whimsical characters—set against dark, solid backdrops. His 1906 design for the green absinthe aperitif Maurin Quina (featuring a mischievous green devil sneaking a cork out of the bottle) exemplified this approach and solidified his reputation. Between 1901 and 1914, Cappiello produced hundreds of posters for Vercasson, establishing a new visual paradigm for 20th-century graphic advertising.

During World War I, Cappiello temporarily suspended his commercial work to serve as an interpreter for the Italian military.

==== The Devambez period (1921–1936) ====
After the war, Cappiello resumed his poster production, signing a long-term contract in 1921 with the Parisian publishing house Devambez. Unlike Vercasson, Devambez functioned as an international agency without a dedicated print shop, subcontracting printing to large lithographic firms and expanding Cappiello's market across Europe.

During this period, Cappiello produced many of his most iconic Art Deco designs, including Pâtes Baroni (1921), Bitter Campari featuring the red "Spiritello" figure (1921), Parapluie Revel (1922), and work for brands such as Pirelli, Chocolat Klaus, and Kub bouillon, as well as promotional posters for entertainer Mistinguett at the Casino de Paris. He remained under contract with Devambez until 1936.

== Death and legacy ==
Cappiello died in Cannes on the French Riviera in 1942 at the age of 66.

Over a career spanning more than four decades, Cappiello designed over 530 commercial and theatrical posters. His emphasis on psychological association, visual economy, and iconic brand characters laid the foundation for modern commercial marketing and heavily influenced the Art Deco style of poster design in the 1920s and 1930s. Original prints of his work are held in major international museums, including the Musée d'Orsay, the Victoria and Albert Museum, and the Metropolitan Museum of Art.

== Selected lithographs ==
La Rose Jacqueminot (Coty perfume ad, 1904)

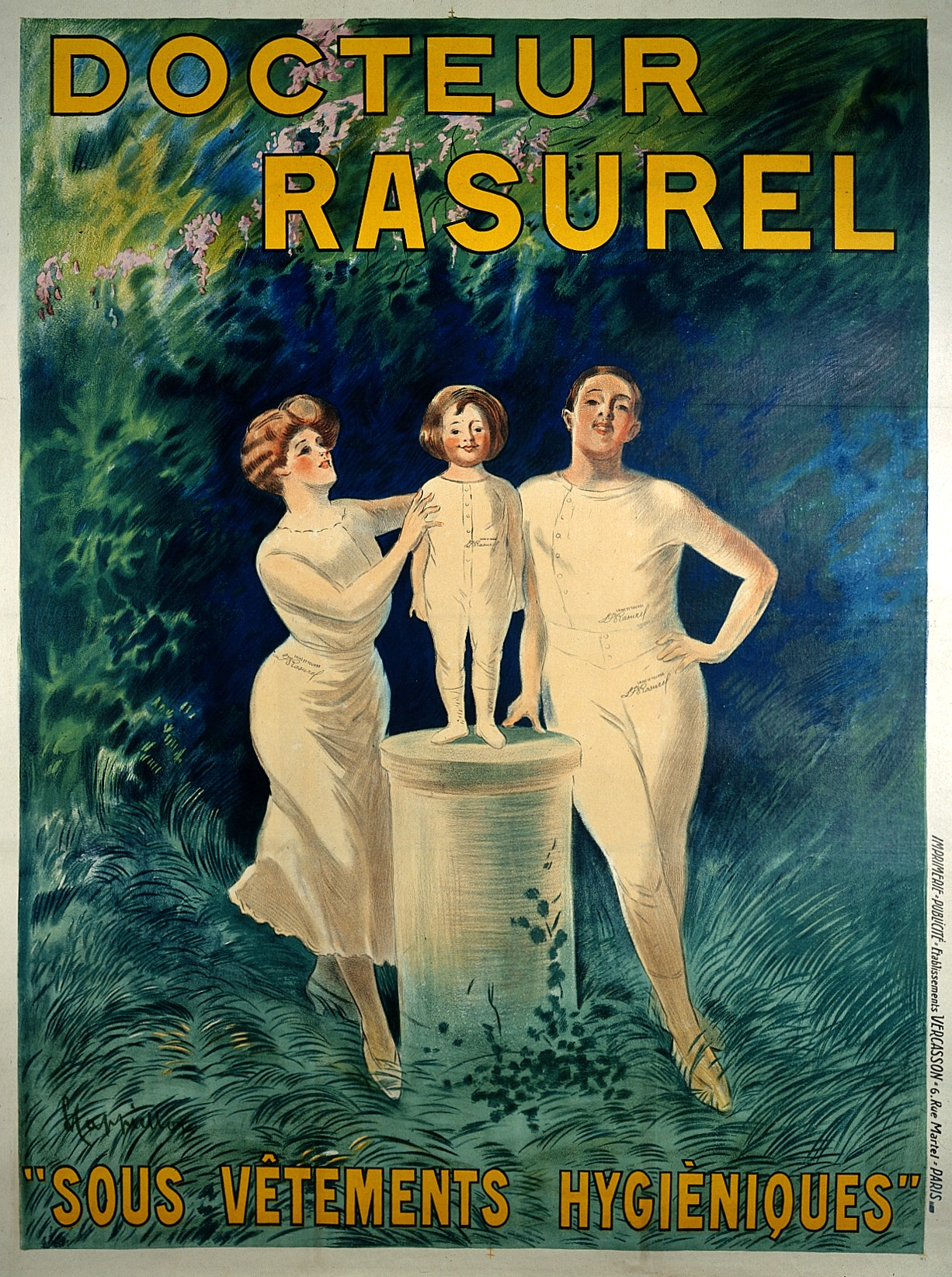
Sous Vêtements Hygiéniques (underclothes ad for Docteur Rasurel, 1906)

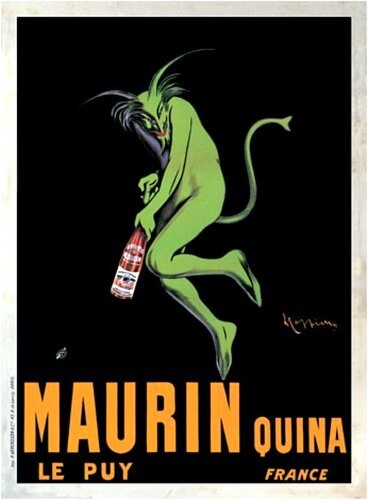
Maurin Quina (French aperitif ad, 1906)

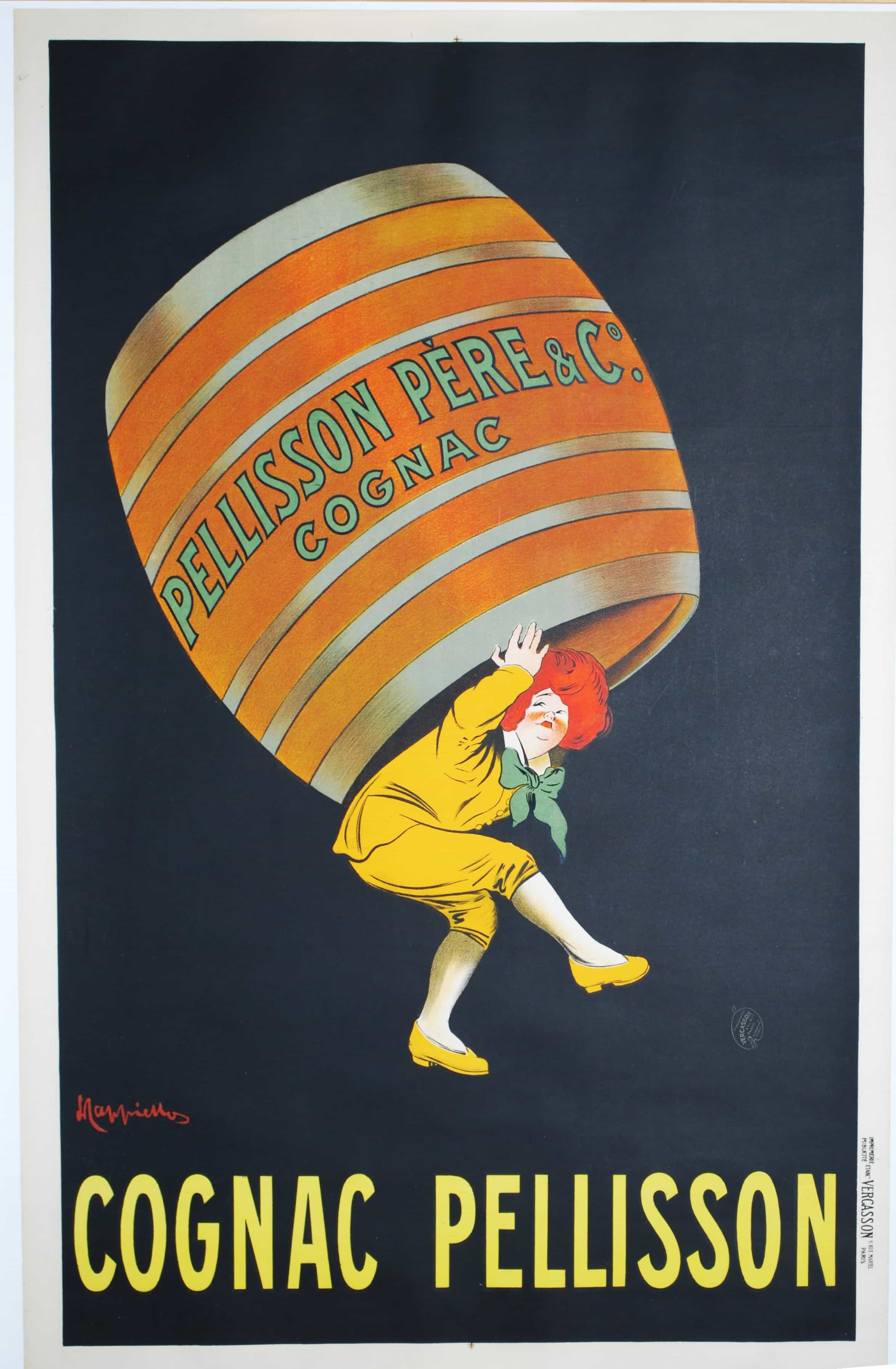
Cognac Pellisson (cognac ad, 1907)

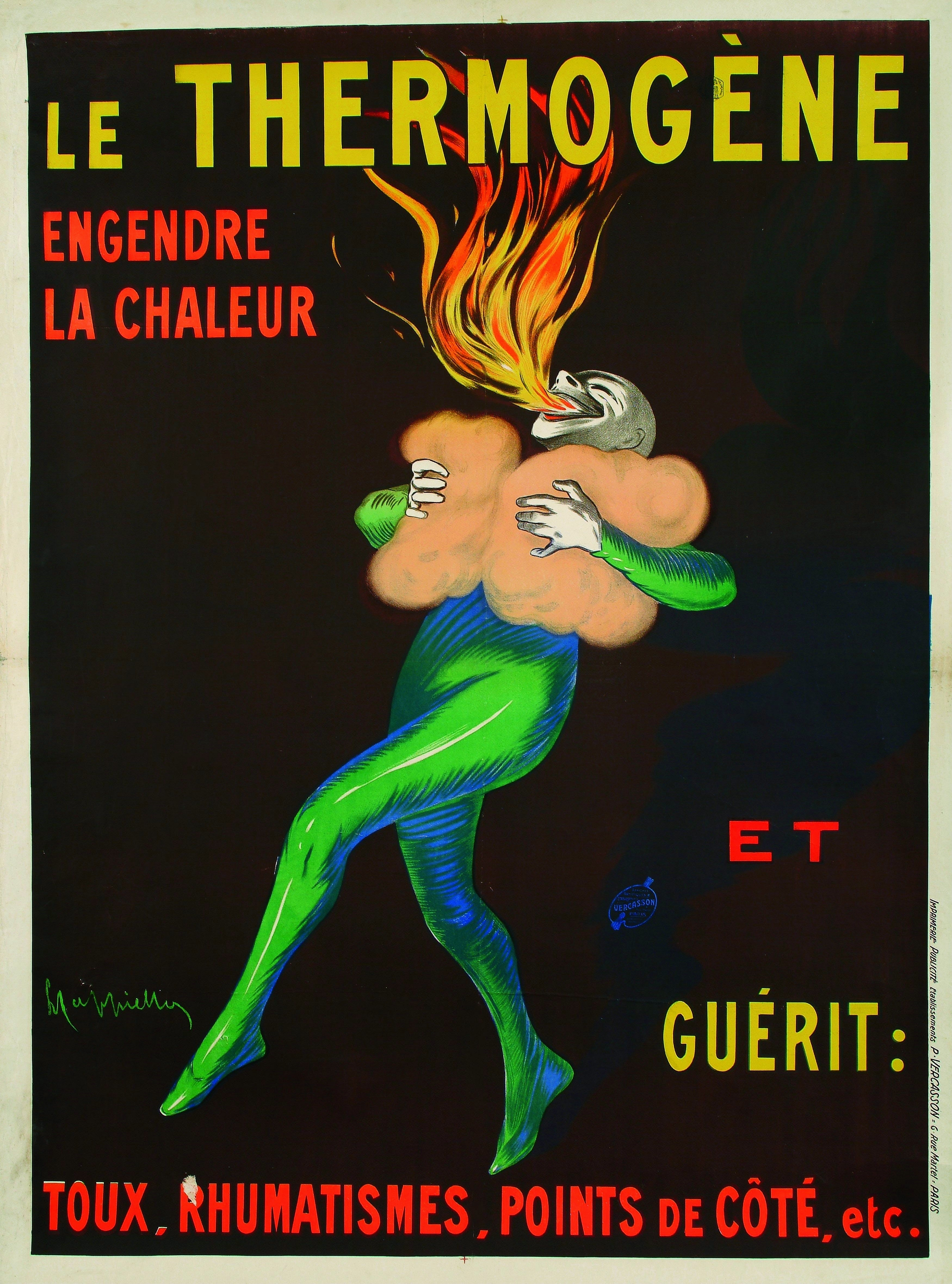
Thermogène (remedy ad, 1909)

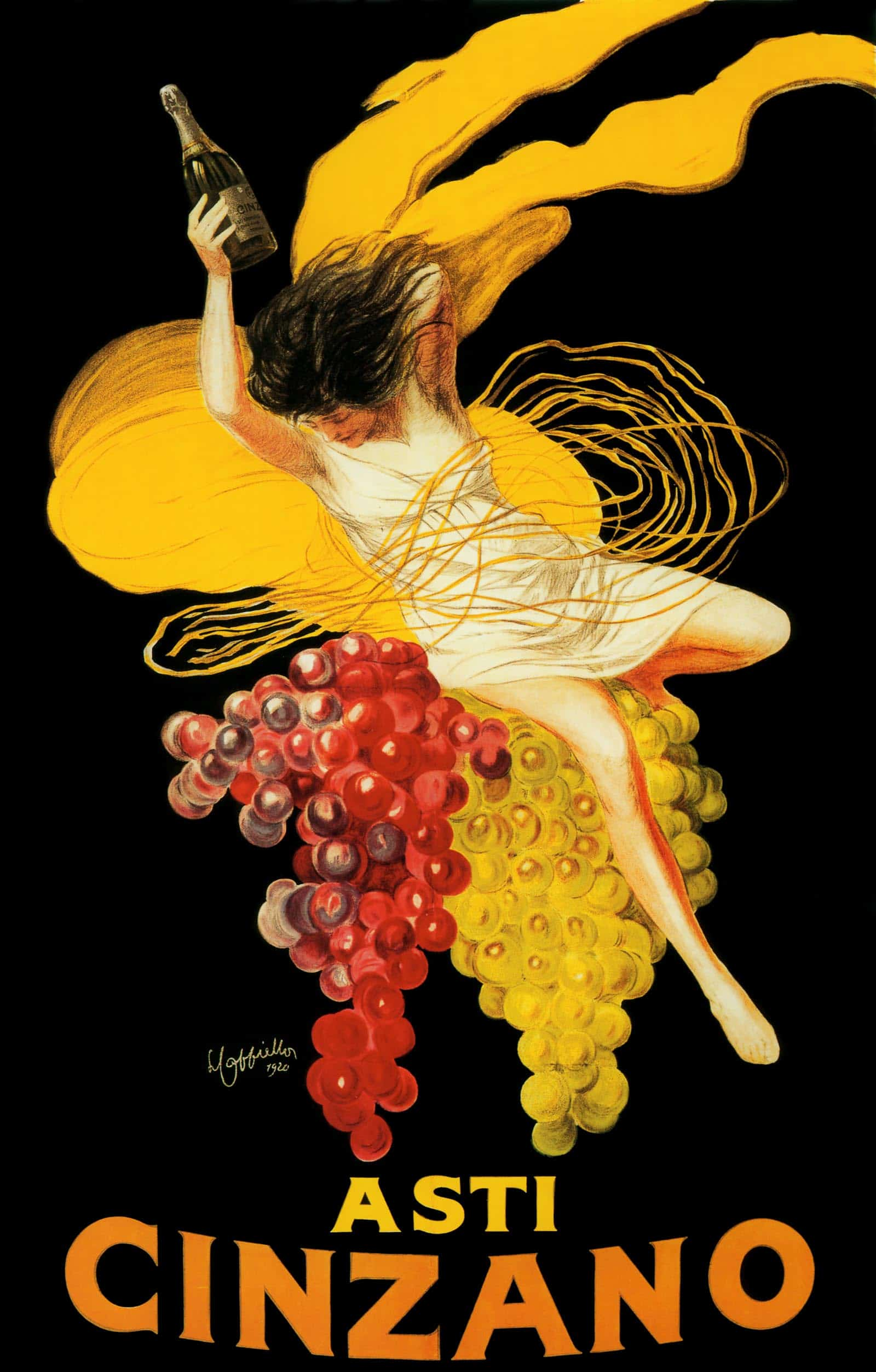
Les Pirates (Italian vermouth ad for Cinzano, 1910)

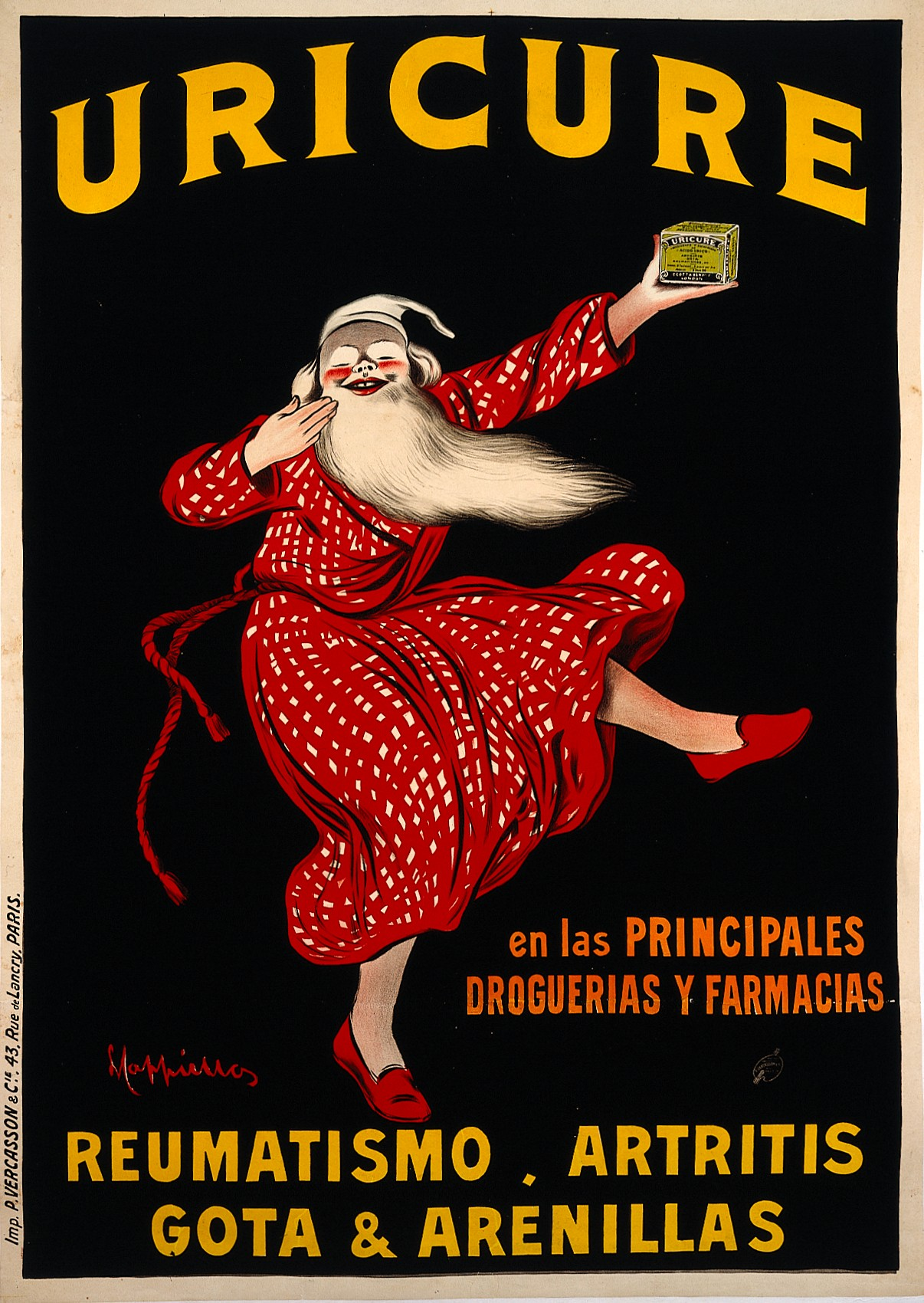
Uricure (pharmaceutical ad, 1910)

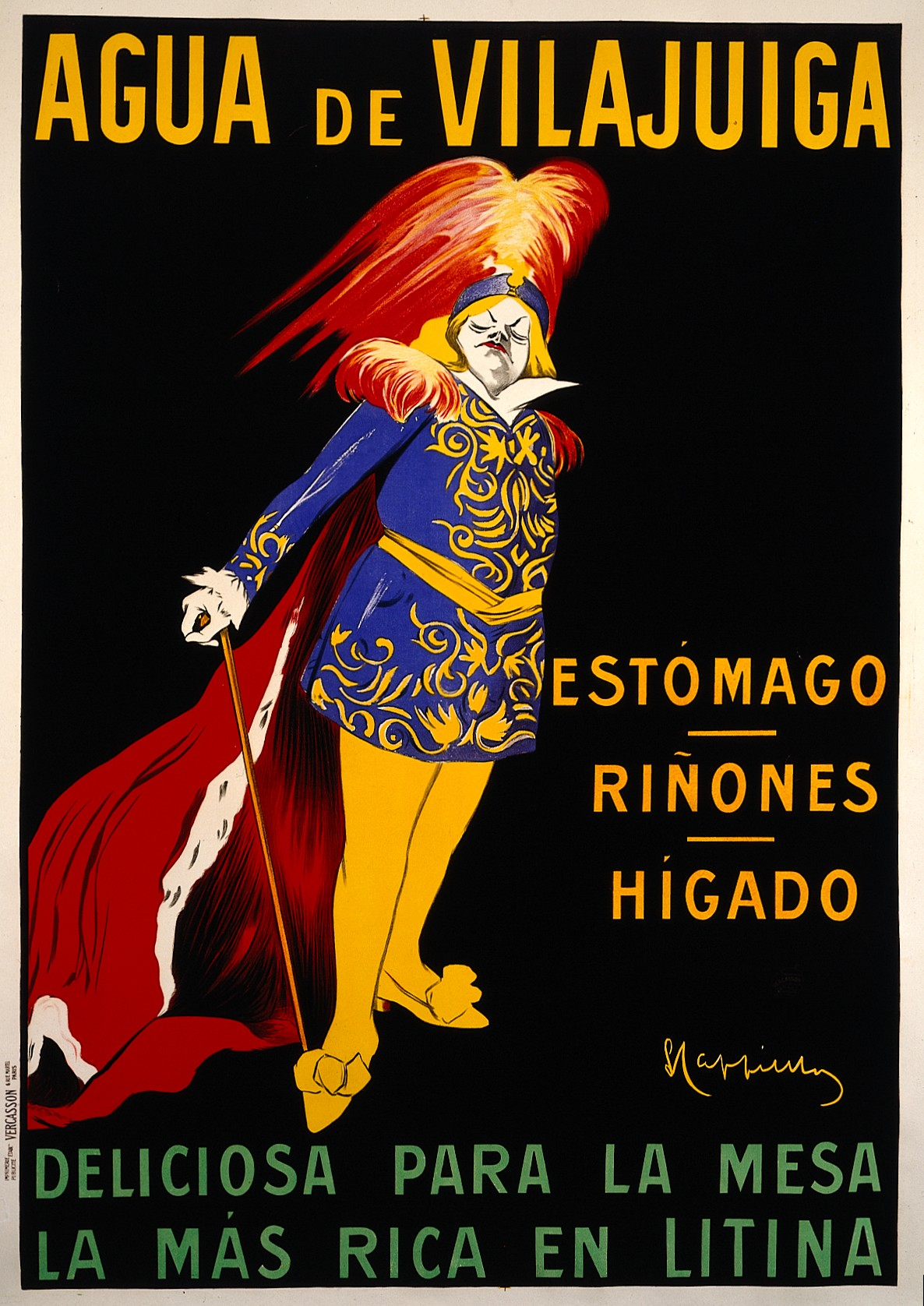
Aigua de Vilajuïga (Spanish mineral water ad, 1910)

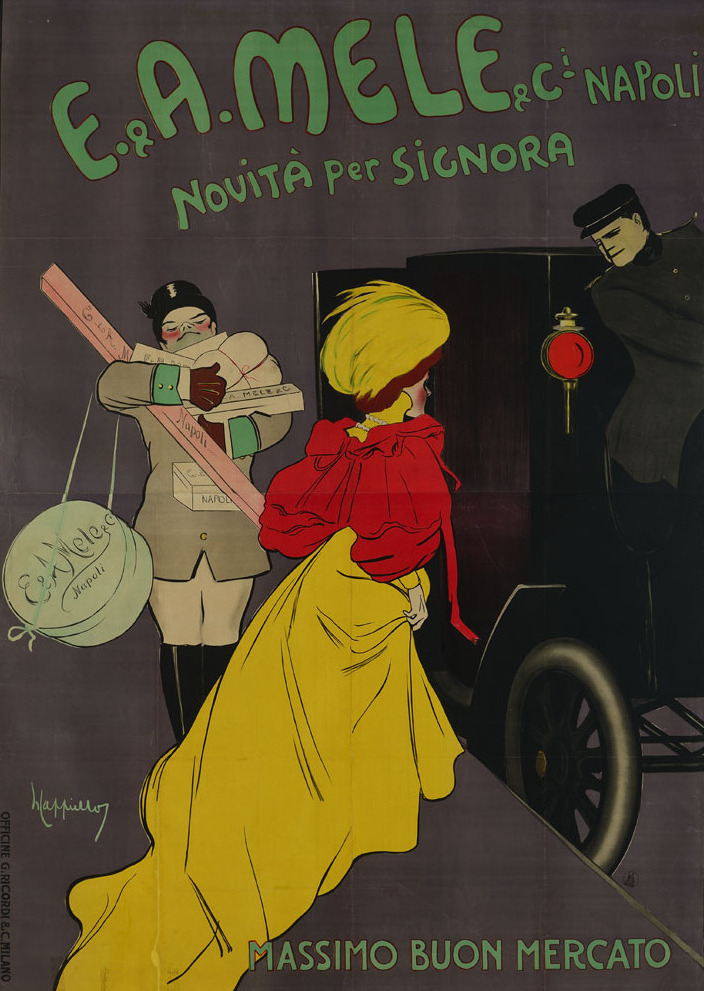
Grandi Magazzini Mele (Italian department store ad, 1914)

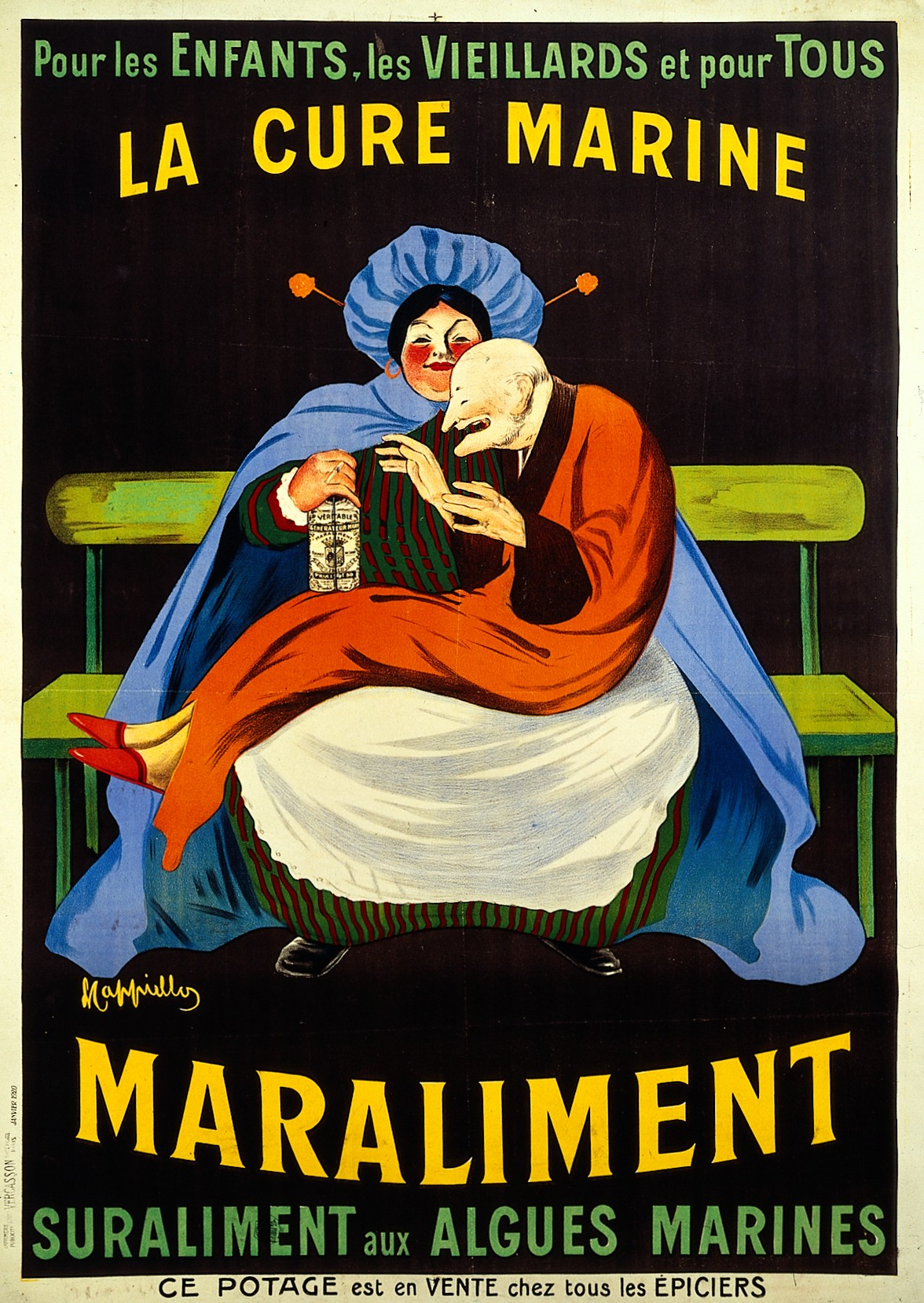
Maraliment (ad for seaweed soup, 1920)

Pâtes Baroni (pasta ad, 1921)

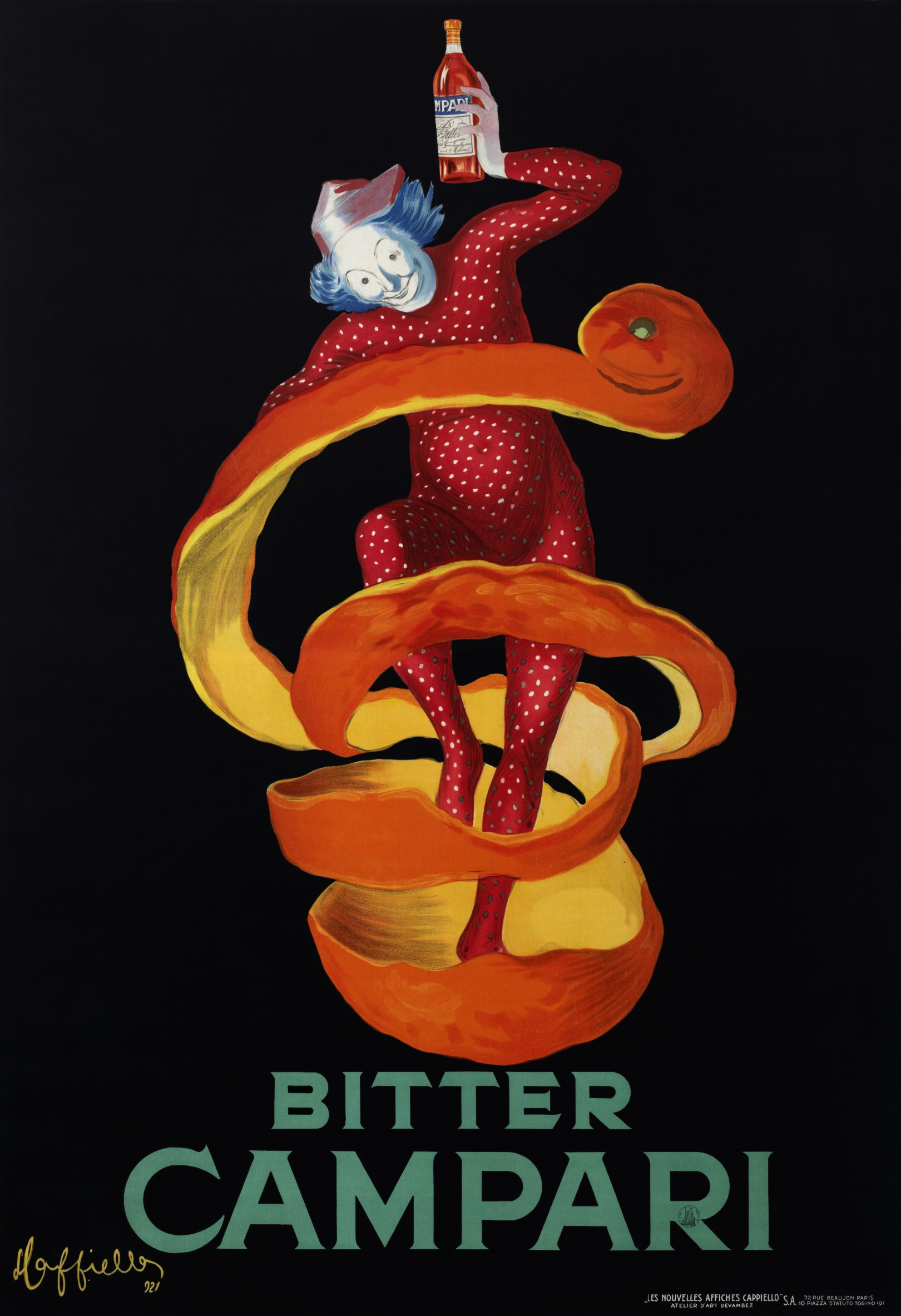
Bitter Campari ("Lo Spiritello", Campari ad, 1921)

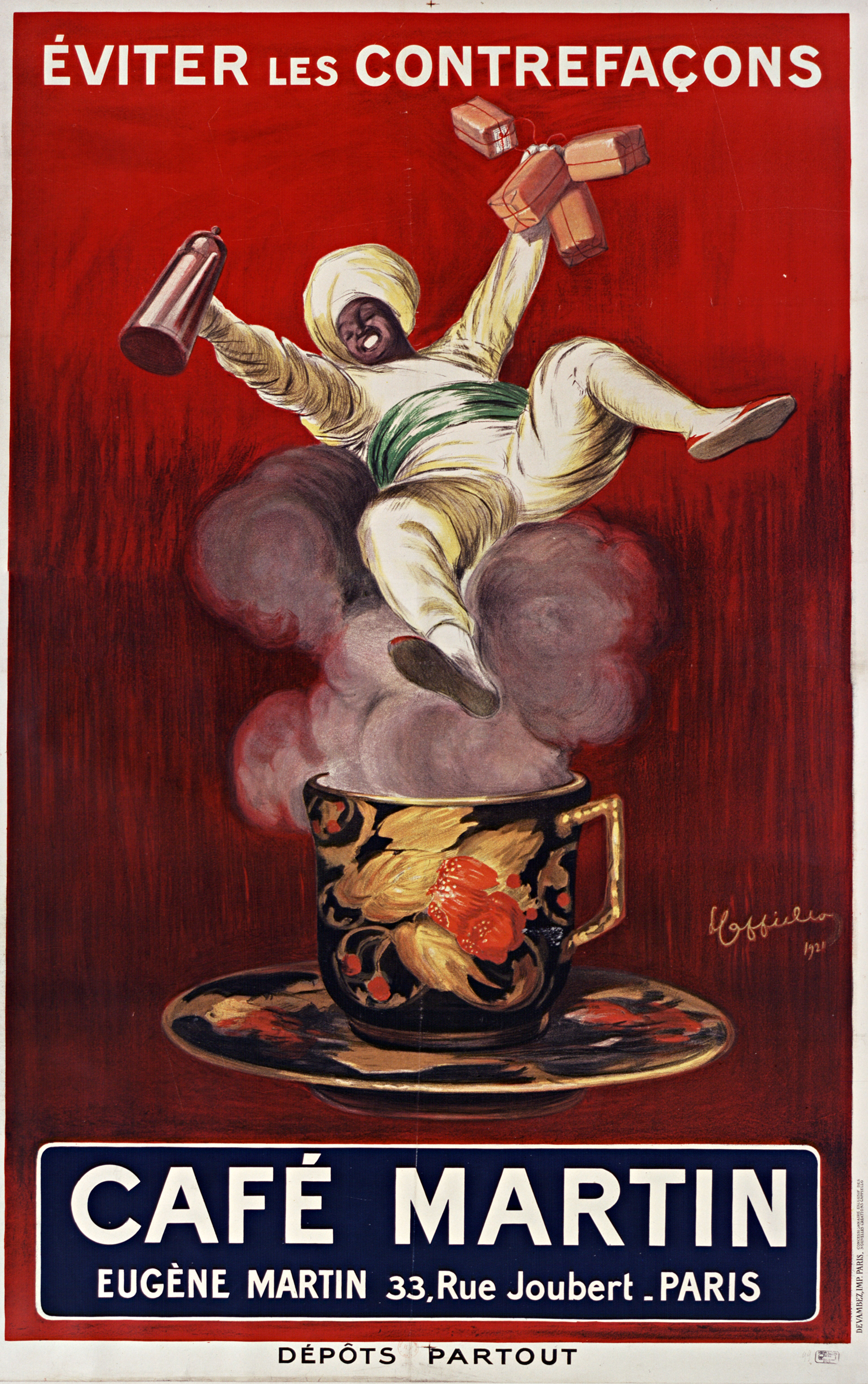
Café Martin (coffee ad, Paris, 1921)

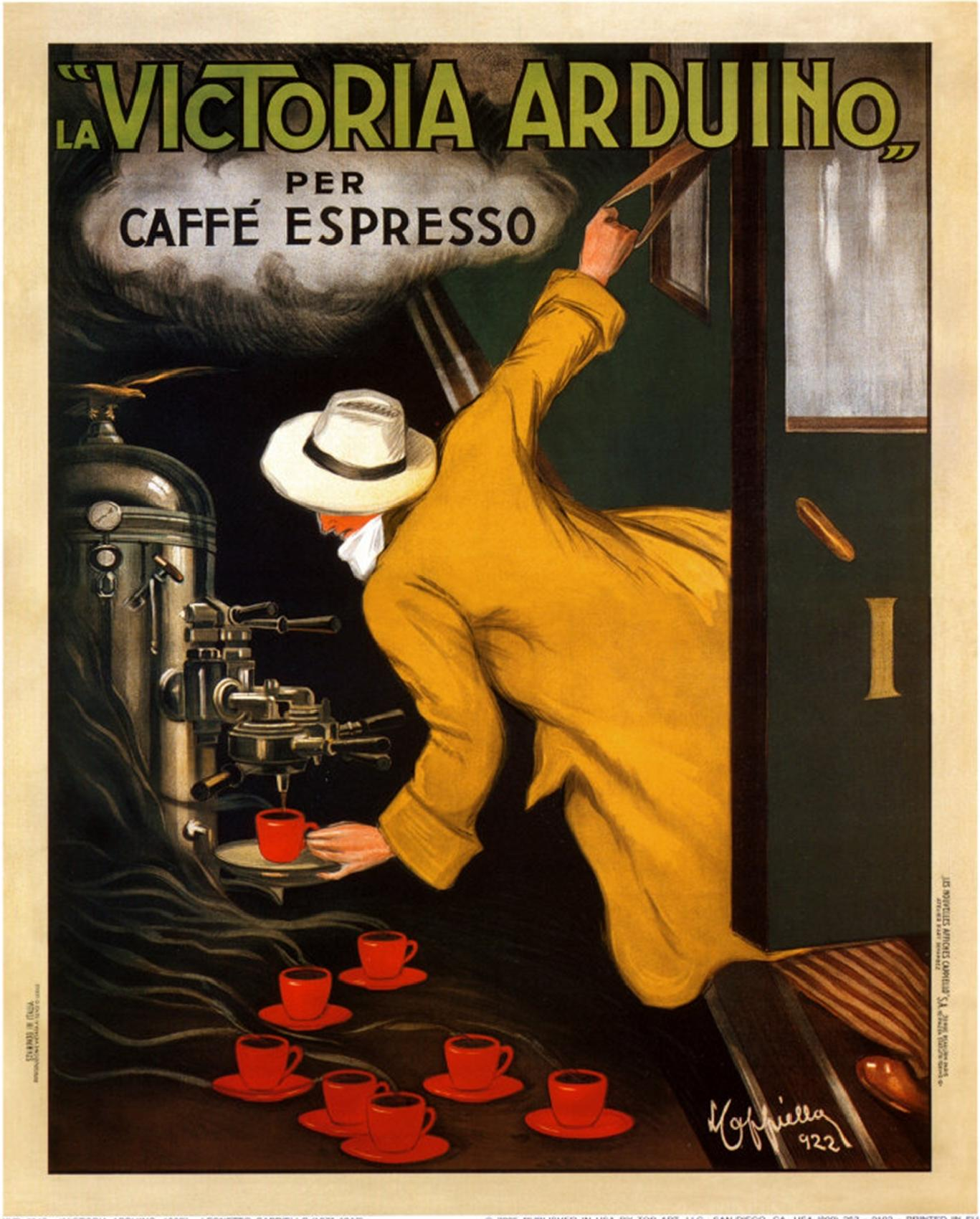
La Victoria Arduino (espresso machine ad, 1922)

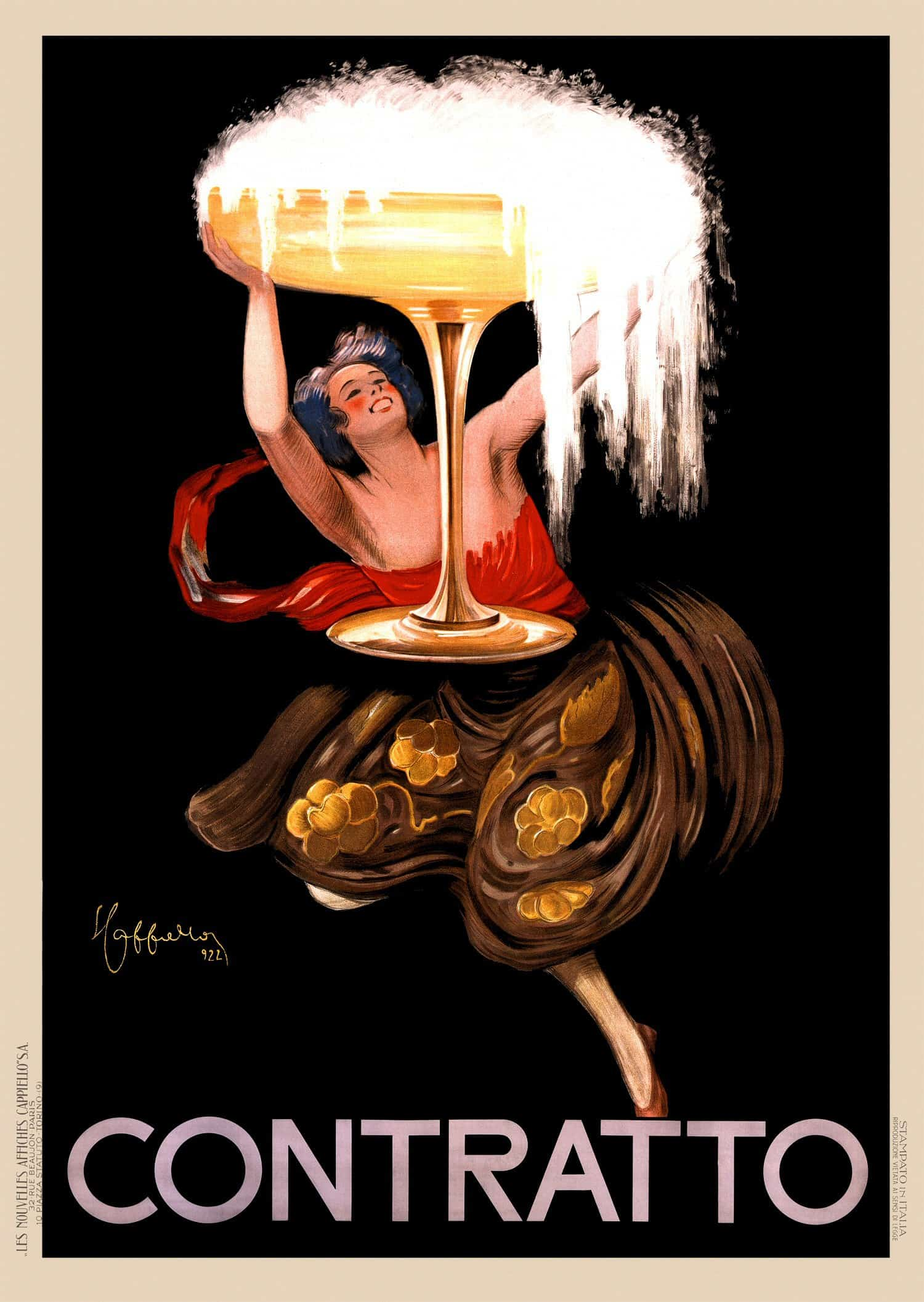
Contratto (liquor ad, 1922)

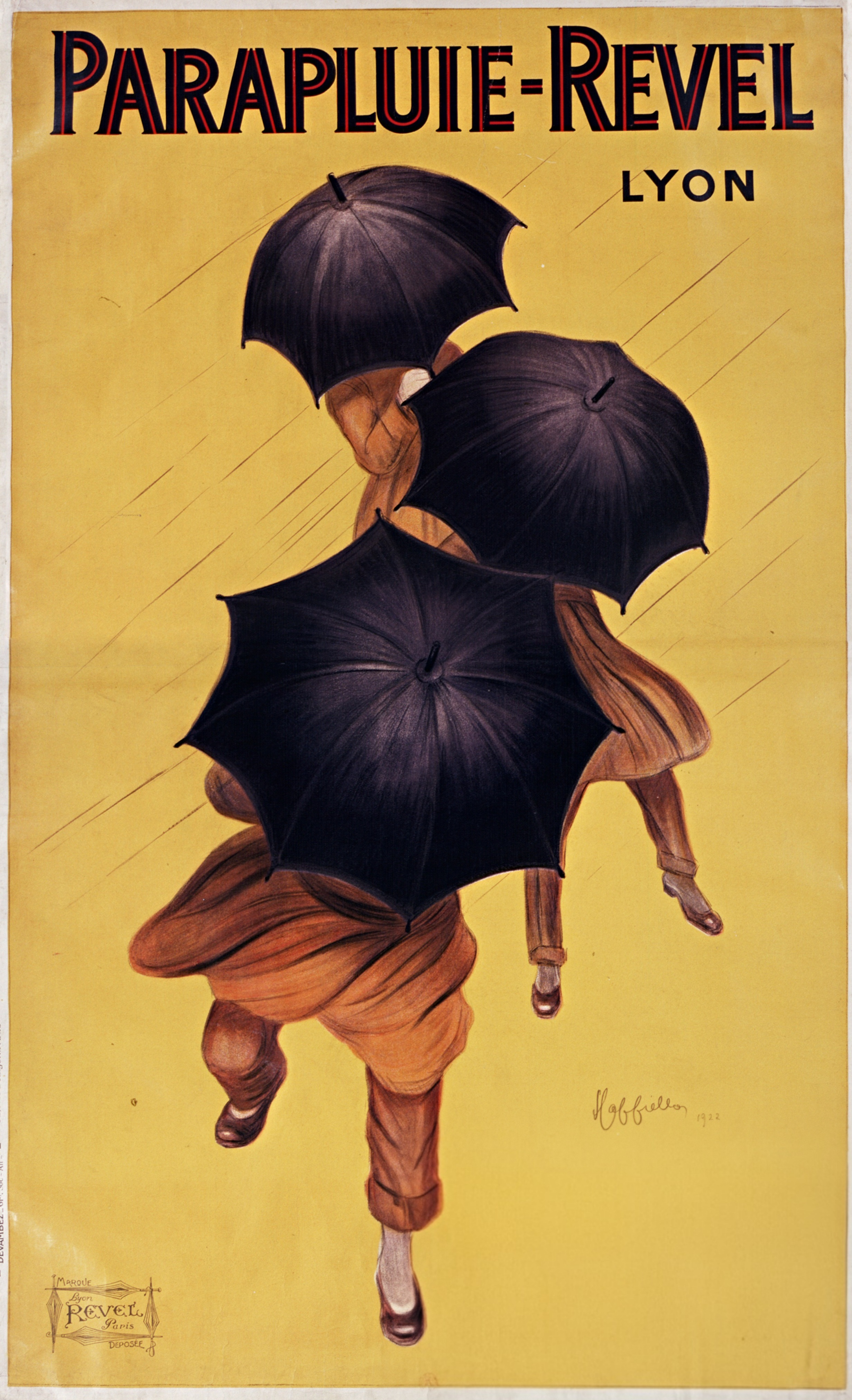
Parapluie Revel (ad for luxury umbrella brand Revel, 1922)

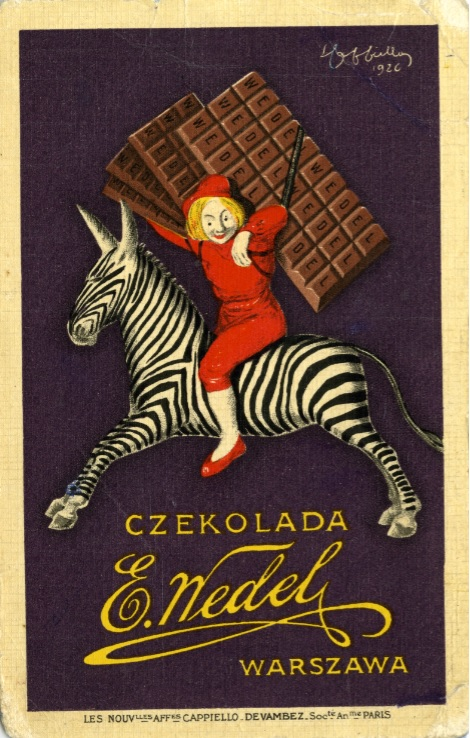
Chłopiec na zebrze ("Boy on a Zebra", E. Wedel chocolate ad, Warsaw, 1926)

== See also ==
- Poster
- Art Deco
- History of graphic design
