= Maurin Quina =

French apéritif advertisement painted by Leonetto Cappiello in 1906

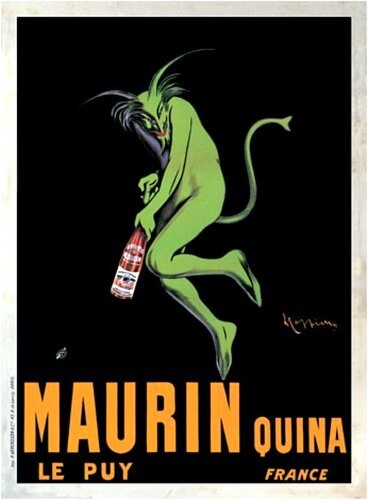
- Artist: Leonetto Cappiello

Maurin Quina is a French apéritif advertisement painted by Leonetto Cappiello in 1906. It is perhaps Cappiello's most famous poster.

The image features a devilish figure sneakily de-corking the bottle; Cappiello used "infernal imagery" in several of his posters for alcohol. The green devil in particular evokes la fée verte (the green fairy), the nickname for absinthe, a drink popular during the Belle Époque. The product was banned by the French government shortly after it was released. This poster, however, is an advertisement for an alcoholic beverage that went out of production in 1906. Maurin is the brand name and Quina is the type of alcohol. The product has since been reintroduced to both the French and American marketplace, featuring Cappiello's poster as the label. It is cherry in flavor with a background of quinine. It is similar to a liqueur, but does not contain enough sugar content to legally be classified as one.
