= The Red Carpets =

Painting by Henri Matisse

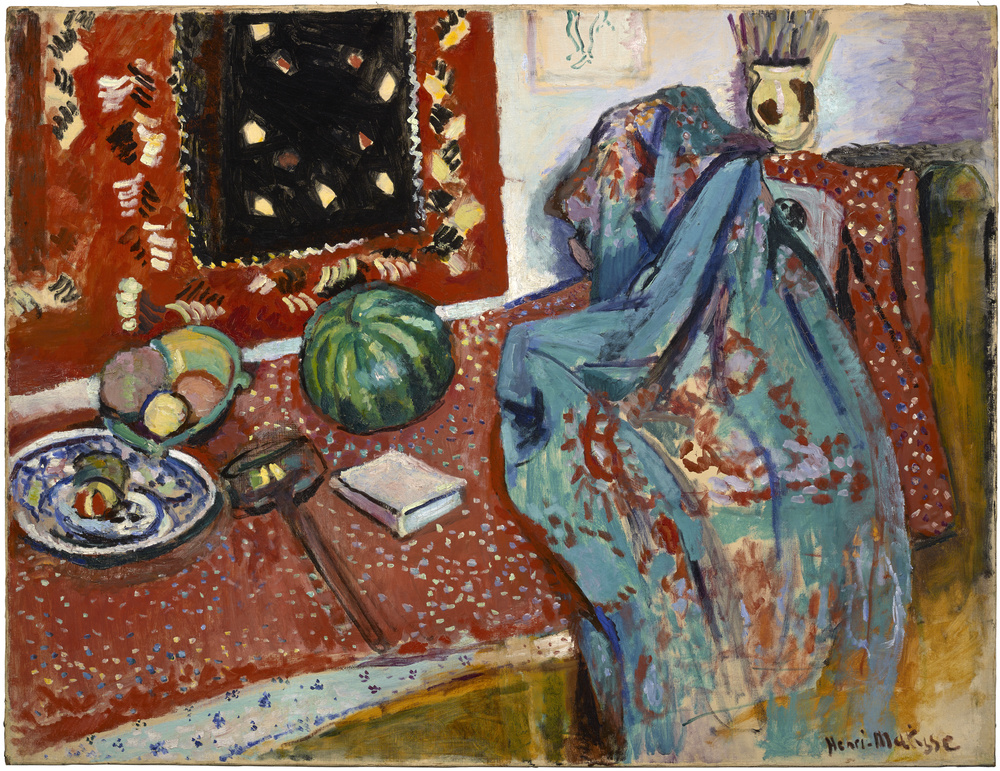

The Red Carpets (French - Les Tapis rouges) is a 1906 oil on canvas still life painting, produced in Collioure by Henri Matisse. It was bought by Marcel Sembat from the galerie Bernheim-Jeune in 1908 and is now in the Museum of Grenoble, to which it was left as part of the collections of Sembat and his wife Georgette Agutte in 1923.

== See also ==
- List of works by Henri Matisse
