= Revel (brand) =

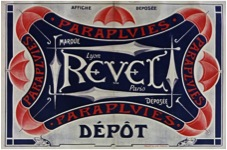
Revel logo in 1900

Revel is a former French brand founded in France in 1851 that manufactured luxury parasols largely for the French expatriates in the former French colonial empire.

== History ==
=== Beginning ===
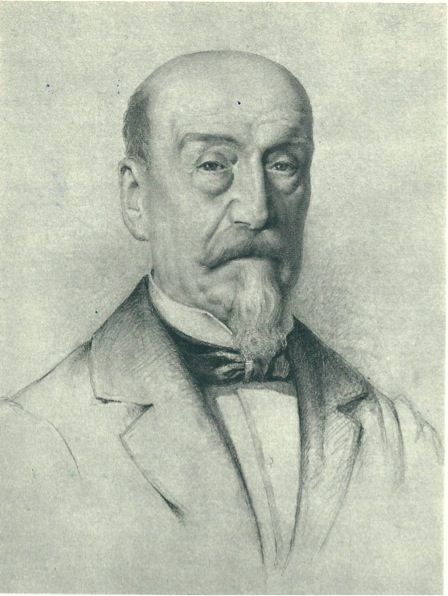
François Revel, founder of the company

François Revel, the founder of Revel, arrived in Lyon, France, around 1830. In Lyon, François Revel joined his brother Pierre at Poncet Frères, a manufacturer of umbrellas, as an apprentice making high quality umbrellas from silk fabrics. Following the shutdown of Poncet Frères, François Revel founded his own company on 2 October 1851.

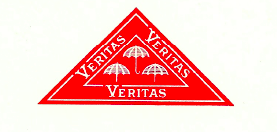
Veritas logo (1880)

François Revel’s first silk umbrella manufacturing workshop was located in Lyon, benefiting from the strong regional silk expertise. In 1860, François Revel was joined by his son, Aimé Revel (who was only 16 years old at the time) who often visited customers all over Europe. In 1880, Aimé Revel created the Veritas brand (with a red triangle) and in 1900 he established the brand Parapluie Revel for French market.

=== International expansion ===
The second half of the 19th century saw Revel grow internationally with the company entering the Brazilian and South-East Asia markets.

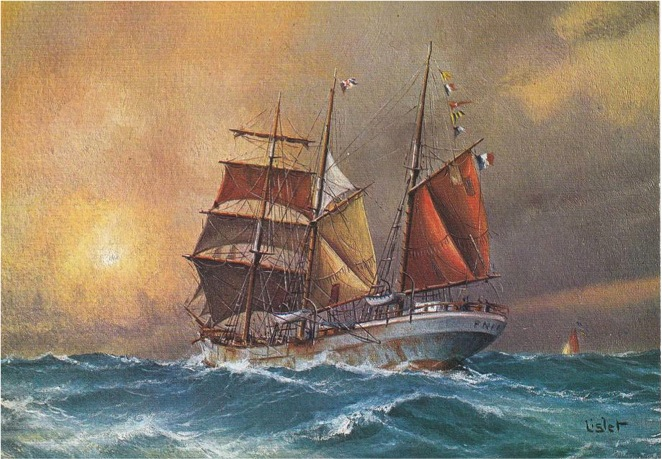
Three-mast sailboat "Goelette La Fanny" painting

The international expansion of Revel had started with Pierre Revel in Brazil in 1851. Pierre had moved to Rio de Janeiro a few years prior and was already in the business of importing other French branded parasols and umbrellas into Brazil. In March 1850, Pierre was joined by his two brothers Henri, 19 years old, and Joseph, 32 years old, who sailed on the "Goelette La Fanny" for Rio de Janeiro. Accordingly, it made sense for Revel to enter the Brazilian market given the fact that the Revel brothers were already present in Brazil and had a good knowledge of the local umbrella market.

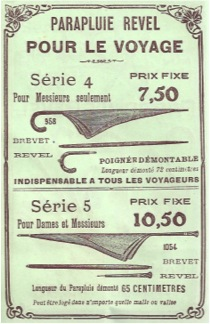
Former Revel Catalogue, (Product "Pour Le Voyage", for travelling, 1914)

By the end of the 19th century, Revel expanded into Southeast Asia and particularly in the former French Indo-China. Revel was a provider of sun accessories to French high society in the colonies, those of whom wanted to protect themselves from the harsh external elements such as the rain and sun. In Asian cultures, fair skin is desirable as tanned skin is associated with outdoor manual labour which is typical of the lower class in society. Parasols and umbrellas were primarily sold in Saigon (now known as Ho Chi Minh), Vietnam and then in Singapore in 1886. To meet increasing demand in this region, Revel increased its production and created its own factory in 1931 in Haiphong, Tonkin (the northernmost part of Vietnam).

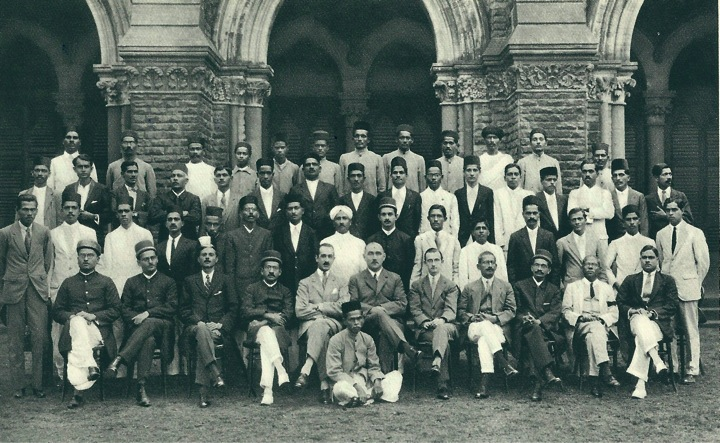
Revel staff in India

Beyond Europe, South America and South East Asia, the brand extended its reach to India and Madagascar. It was sold in Madagascar from 1896 as a result of a journey by the French General, Joseph Gallieni. When General Joseph Gallieni arrived in Madagascar in 1896, he learned that only the queen Ranavalona III and noble persons were allowed to be seen using an umbrella. Appalled by this custom, he published a decree in the local newspaper ‘Voa-Voa’ allowing all people (including the indigenous) to use umbrellas. Revel created a local agency in Tamatave to import Revel’s luxury products in the wake of this new decree.

=== In popular culture ===
In 1922, Revel engaged the famous Italian poster art designer Leonetto Cappiello to create the famous ad representing three people with umbrellas, it was published by the fine parisian printer's firm, Devambez, in the name of "Les Nouvelles Affiches Leonetto Cappiello".

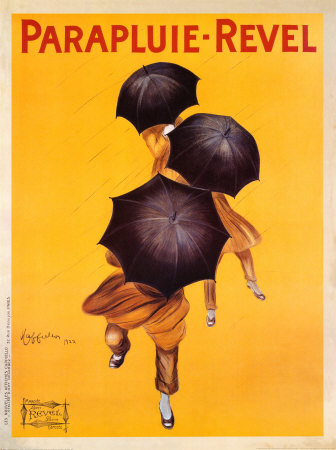
Parapluie Revel (advert for luxury umbrellas, 1922)

In 1929, Revel diversified into silk stockings and engaged Leonetto Cappiello once again to promote its new products. The artist was inspired by the previous one (with three with umbrellas) and created a poster with three women with silk stockings.

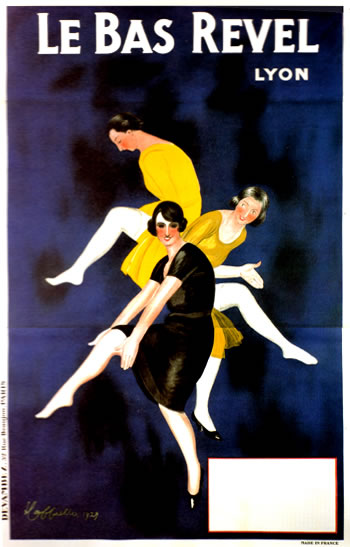
Le Bas Revel (advert for silk stockings, 1929)

In 1992, the producer of the drama film The Lover (film) (an illicit affair between a teenage French girl and a wealthy Chinese man in 1929 French Indo-China) asked Revel to recreate for the film, the same parasol, the brand was selling in the former French Indo-China in the 1920s.

Since its inception in 1851, Revel has gained international fame, with its parasols and umbrellas used and endorsed by various people as Paul Valéry of the French Academy, the writer H. G. Wells and Edouard Herriot, former mayor of Lyon (France).

== See also ==
- Boutique Bétaille in Paris
