= Port Revel =

Coordinates: 45.290361°N 5.315164°E

- Formation: 1967
- Type: Maritime Pilot Training Center
- Headquarters: 3500 route de Revel 38 870 St Pierre de Bressieux
- Location: France
- Website: https://www.portrevel.com/

The Port Revel Shiphandling Training Centre, located in the town of Saint-Pierre-de-Bressieux in the Isère department, near Grenoble, is a training school for pilots, captains, and officers on large vessels, such as supertankers, container ships, LNG carriers, and cruise ships. The facility uses 1/25-scale models on an artificial lake designed to simulate natural conditions, including ports, canals, and the open sea. It is the first institution of its kind in the world.

== History ==
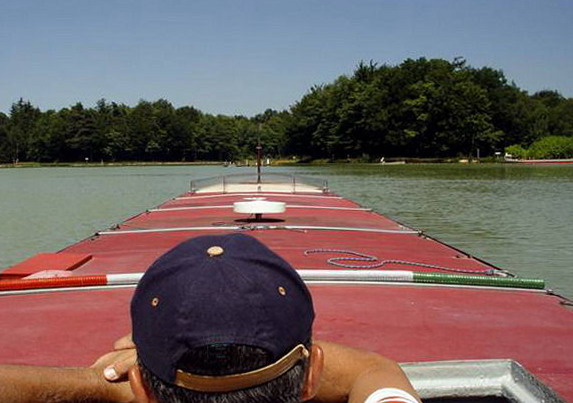
View from the bridge of a manned model tanker at Port Revel

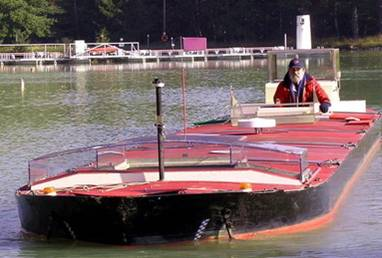
Model of a supertanker with 250 000 tonnes deadweight (DWT) at Port Revel

The center dates back to the 1950s, when Sogreah, the company behind the creation of Port-Revel, used scale models to study erosion along the banks of the Suez Canal.

In the late 1960s, observations made on ship models were used by Esso to model the maneuvers of much larger vessels, such as oil tankers. The Center was established in 1967 by Laboratoire Dauphinois d'Hydraulique (now Artelia).

After three years under Esso’s control between 1967 and 1970, the Center was taken over by Sogreah in 1970.

Courses are taught by former maritime pilots. Since 1967, the Center has trained more than 8,500 maritime personnel, pilots, captains, and officers from around the world. French, European, Australian, Brazilian, and North American pilots account for 70% of the trainees.

This type of training is now recommended by the International Maritime Organization pursuant to Resolution A 960 (23)

During the 1970s, most trainees were captains; then, in the 1990s, the first marine pilots began visiting the center.

Marine piloting in manned simulators offered the following advantages:

- instructors are able to tailor instruction to the specific needs of maritime personnel in training;
- the lake facilities were redesigned to create shallow water areas with currents and to replicate port environments;
- all types of large vessels are available, and electronic systems have become more sophisticated to reproduce real-world navigation conditions;
- tugs have been incorporated into training since 2000, including mooring, docking, and escort maneuvers;
- steerable pod propulsion has been available since 2006
- the lake area was expanded from four to five hectares during the winter of 2008–2009;
- A large container ship (8,500 TEU) was added to the fleet in 2009;
- A large 185,000-ton LNG carrier, the Q-Max, was added in 2010;
- A controllable pitch propeller (CPP) was introduced in 2013;
- A cruise ship (5,000 passengers) with two pods and powerful bow thrusters was added in 2014.
- A very large container ship (22,000 TEU) was added to the fleet in 2020.

== Manned models ==
Scale models can be transported and operated by at least one person. They must behave like real ships, providing the user with the same sensations. Wind, currents, waves, water depths, channels, and mooring points are realistically reproduced.

Scale models are used for research (e.g., on ship behavior), engineering (port development), and for training maritime pilots, captains, and officers in maneuvering. The models are generally built to a scale of 1:25.

The objective of training on scale models is to enable seafarers to acquire or develop their maneuvering skills through a better understanding of a ship’s reactions under real operating conditions. Ship models are considered by captains and pilots to be the best simulators. Training on these models provides experience that could never be gained under real operating conditions, as neither shipowners nor maritime authorities would accept the associated risks. The models allow for errors and the exploration of extreme situations.

Periodic training on scale models will maintain shiphandling skills at their highest level and complements electronic simulators.

While maneuvers involving currents, waves, tugs, anchoring, shore effects, etc., are reproduced more accurately on scale models, digital simulators are more realistic when it comes to the bridge environment.

Ideally, maneuvering training should be based on three pillars:

1. Training on actual ships: the environment is more realistic, but the time spent and acceptable risks are limited;
2. Training on scale models: maneuvers can be pushed beyond safety limits, the ships actually sail, but the captain’s perception and wind conditions are limited;
3. Training on digital simulators: the water and boats are represented by equations, but the bridge and 360° view are realistic enough to simulate crew management and crisis situations.

== Lake ==
The 5 hectare lake is located in the Isère department, near Grenoble, in an area with very mild wind conditions. Furthermore, it is sheltered by a forest. The uncontrolled effects of the wind on the boats are therefore minimized.

At a scale of 1:25, the lake represents a navigable area of approximately 5 nautical miles by 2, allowing multiple models to sail simultaneously at normal speed and dock at one of the 50 berths along the quays. Shallow water areas (less than 10% of the keel depth for some vessels) account for about 50% of the lake’s surface area.

Wave and current generators, wind generators, and various complex harbor approach configurations are part of the lake’s equipment, 40% of which is subject to currents.

== Fleet ==
All models are built to a scale of 1:25. There are 12 ships and 5 tugboats. All ships are equipped with indicators for rudder angle, engine speed, ship speed, wind speed, etc. Most ships are equipped with bow and stern thrusters as well as anchors. Five ships are equipped with a GPS tracking system and special steering devices.

== Sources ==
- IMPA, 2014 - IMPA on Pilotage - pp161–169
- John Mc Phee, 2006 - Uncommon Carriers - pp43–65
- Michel R. Denis, 2006 - Récits Insolites - p49 & p113
- The Nautical Institute, 1997 - On Pilotage and Shiphandling - p37, p181, p260, p280, p305
