= The Pool of London (painting) =

Painting by André Derain

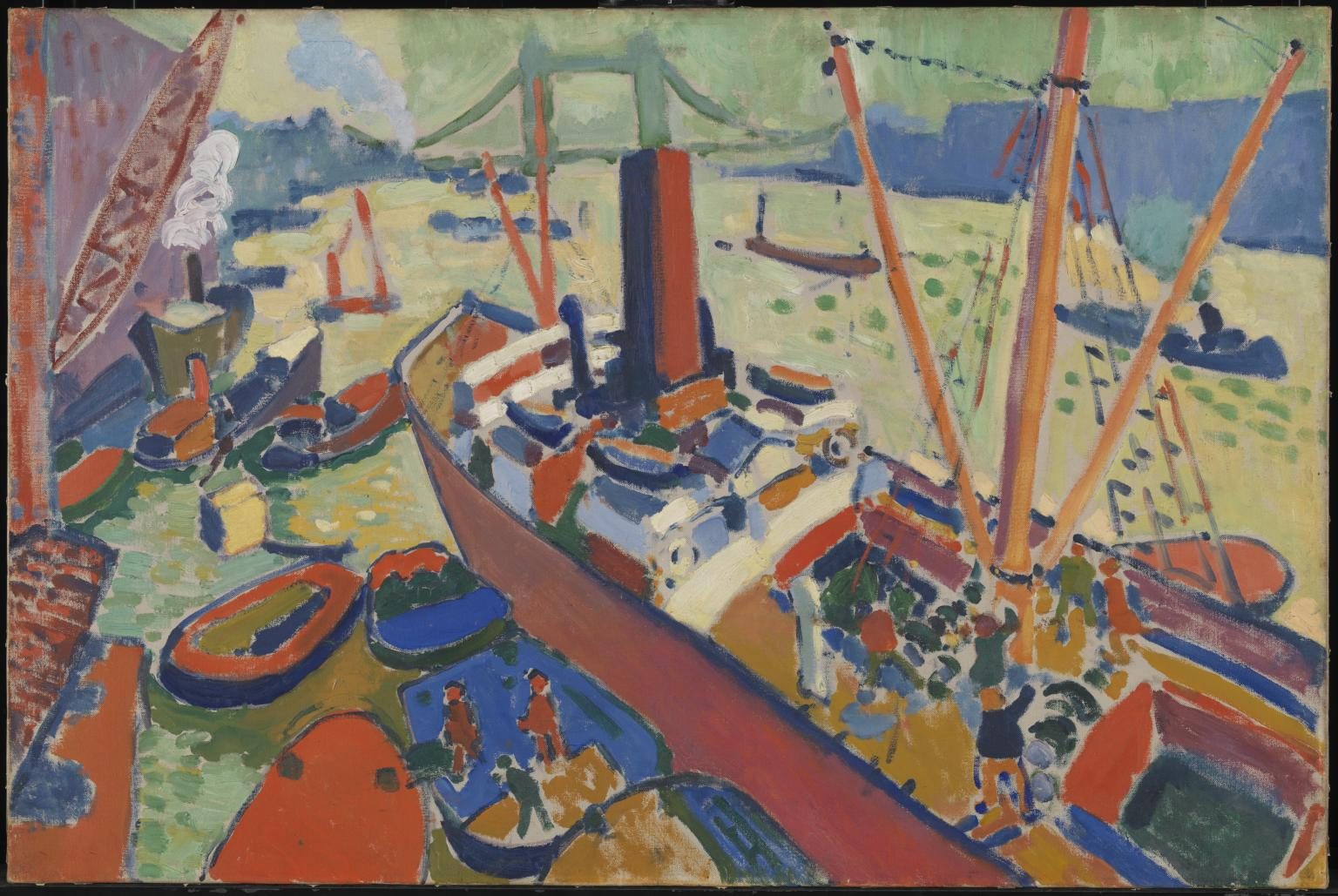
- Artist: André Derain
- Year: 1906
- Type: Oil on canvas
- Dimensions: 65.7 by 99.1 centimetres (25.9 in × 39.0 in)
- Location: Tate Modern, London

The Pool of London is an oil on canvas painting by French artist André Derain, from 1906.

== History and description ==
It is in the collection of Tate Modern. At the suggestion of Ambroise Vollard, Derain travelled to London to paint works that reflected the popularity of Claude Monet's earlier London series. The painting depicts the Pool of London, a stretch of the River Thames, as seen from London Bridge. The painting was one of a number of works featured in the Courtauld Gallery's 2006 exhibition "André Derain: The London Paintings"

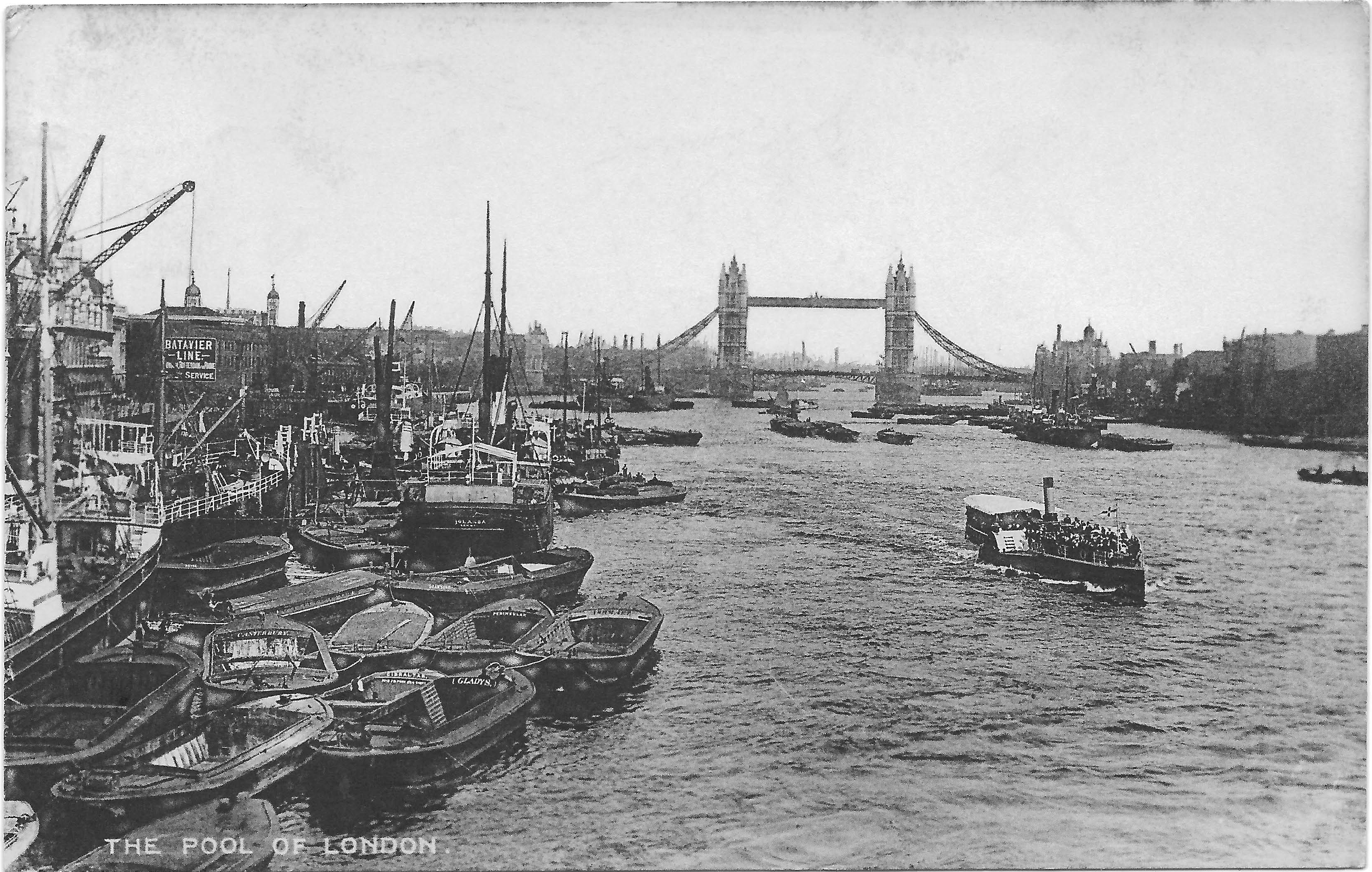
A view of the Pool of London, River Thames, around 1938
