= Evan Gorga =

Italian opera singer (1865–1957)

Evangelista Gennaro Gorga (6 February 1865 – 5 December 1957) was an Italian lyric tenor. He is best known for originating the role of Rodolfo in the original production of Giacomo Puccini's La bohème at the Teatro Regio Torino in 1896.

== Early life ==
Evan Gorga was born in Brocco (now Broccostella), Italy in the province of Caserta (now Frosinone). His father, Pietro Gorga, was a small land owner, while his mother, Matilde De Santis, was the daughter of a local nobleman. The family lived in a house that stood in what is now the historical center of Broccostella.

== Education and career ==
As a teenager and a young man, Gorga studied voice with a teacher with the surname Franceschetti. In 1894, he made his professional opera debut in the title role of Verdi's Ernani when called in to replace the scheduled performer, Francesco Tamagno, who was sick. In 1895, he performed the role of Wilhelm Meister in Ambroise Thomas's Mignon, Le Chevalier des Grieux in Jules Massenet's Manon, and Fritz Kobus in Pietro Mascagni's L'amico Fritz, all at the Teatro Comunale di Cagliari. He also performed in a production of Verdi's I Lombardi alla prima crociata at the Teatro Costanzi in Rome in September 1895.

In 1896, Gorga became a part of music history when he originated the role of Rodolfo in the original production of Giacomo Puccini's La bohème at the Teatro Regio Torino. That same year he also played the role of Faust in Boito's Mefistofele.

In 1897, Gorga sang several roles at the Teatro La Fenice in Venice including the role of Marcello in Leoncavallo's La bohème which, like Puccini's version, is based on Henry Murger's Scènes de la vie de Bohème.

Over the next couple of years, Gorga reprised the role of Rodolfo in Puccini's La bohème with several companies, including the Teatro Piccinni in Bari, Teatro San Carlo in Naples and performances in Genoa. He gave performances of the title role in Gounod's Faust with several companies and was the tenor soloist is a production of Lorenzo Perosi's oratorio La risurrezione di Lazzaro at the Teatro dell'Aquila in Fermo.

In January 1899, Gorga once again reprised the role of Rodolfo in Puccini's La bohème at the Teatro Drammatico in Verona. And although he received excellent critical reviews, this was his last performance. It is unclear why he gave up such a successful opera career at the young age of 34.

Apparently, Gorga recorded his voice privately. TimaClub, an amateur record label, intended to release said recording on a commercial CD. For unknown reasons, the project never came into fruition, and at present no other recordings of his voice are known.

== Personal life ==
Gorga was a collector of antiques and artistic works. Among the large quantity of pieces he collected was a vast array of musical instruments and medical instruments. Unfortunately, due to financial difficulties suffered during the Great Depression and World War II, Gorga had to sell about a half of this collection. In 1949 he left a collection of about 3.000 pieces, made up of mostly musical instruments but also a few paintings and other forms of art, to the State of Italy that is now on display at the Galleria Borghese in Rome. It is the largest collection of any kind ever given to the museum and makes up the bulk of the museum's entire musical instrument collection. Although technically a gift under a 1949 law, the Italian government agreed to pay Gorga's debts and to give him a life allowance in return for the collection. His medical collection become the core of the Medical History Museum of the Rome University exposition.

== Sources ==
- Operissimo.com
- The New Grove Dictionary of Opera, edited by Stanley Sadie (1992), 5,448 pages, ISBN 0-333-73432-7 and ISBN 1-56159-228-5
- The Oxford Dictionary of Opera, by John Warrack and Ewan West (1992), 782 pages, ISBN 0-19-869164-5
- Opera: A Concise History, by Leslie Orrey and Rodney Milnes, World of Art, Thames & Hudson
