= Jeanne Laisné (soprano) =

French soprano

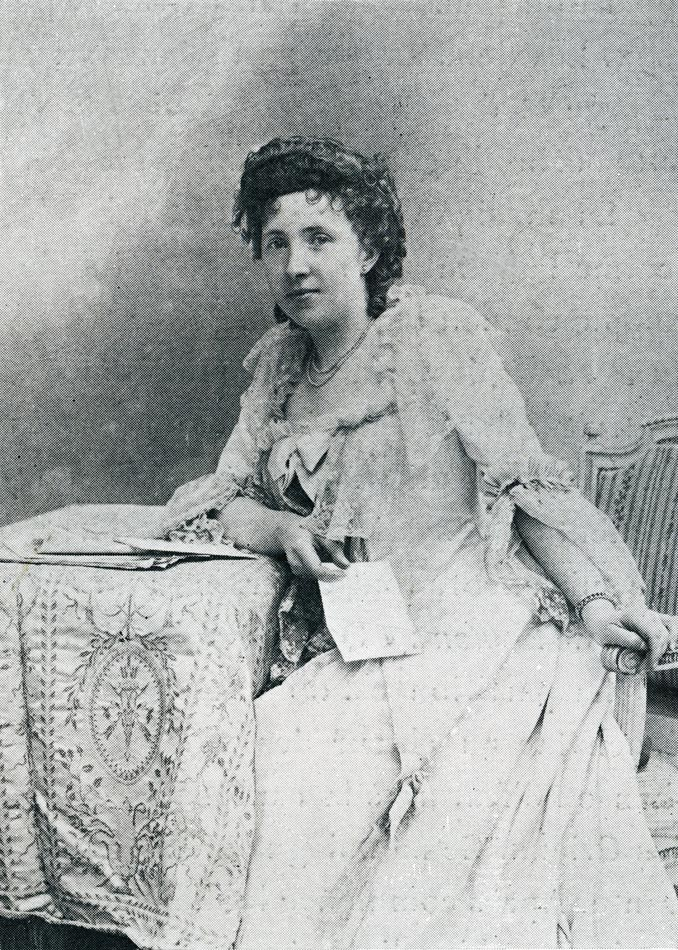
- in the role of Aurore from Le portrait de Manon
- Born: Marie Sophie Jeanne Laisné; 21 March 1870; Paris, France
- Education: Conservatoire de Paris
- Occupation: Operatic soprano
- Spouse: Jules Victor Henri Libent

Marie Sophie Jeanne Laisné (born 21 March 1870; year of death unknown) was a French operatic soprano with the Opéra-Comique. She started her career as Sophie in the first French production of Massenet's Werther, and went on to create the roles of Aurore in Jules Massenet's Le portrait de Manon, Jeanne in Benjamin Godard's La Vivandière, La Duchesse de Fronsac in Henri Hirschmann's L'amour à la Bastille, and Henriette in Ernest Lefèvre-Dérodé's Le follet. Other notable roles include Micaela in Bizet's Carmen and as Mimi in Puccini's La bohème.

== Biography ==
Laisné studied at the Conservatoire de Paris under Ernest Boulanger, graduating in 1892, after which she was engaged by the Opéra-Comique. She made her opera début on 16 January 1893 as Sophie in the first Paris production of Jules Massenet's Werther, which also featured Marie Delna, Max Bouvet, and Guillaume Ibos in leading roles.

She created the role of Aurore in Jules Massenet's Le portrait de Manon, a sequel to his earlier Manon, at the Opéra-Comique on 8 May 1894. Years after des Grieux's tragic romance, he has adopted a son, who is in love with Aurore, who, unbeknownst to des Grieux, is Manon's niece. The two young lovers have to remind him of his own tragic youth, in order to get him to accept that love should reign in their generation. In connection with the première, writing in La Nouvelle Revue (1 June 1894) the author and librettist Louis Gallet refers to "la charmante Mlle Laisné, qui joue et chante à ravir le rôle d'Aurore" (the charming Miss Laisné who plays and sings the role of Aurore so ravishingly). Le Matin discussed her charming voice and effective execution, and Le Figaro discussed how she agreeably chirped and trilled her way through Aurore.

In 1898, Le Matin praised her performance in Fidelio, stating "Mlle Lai[s]nè a une voix d'une pureté délicieuse, qu'elle sait conduire avec un art consommé" (Miss Lai[s]né has a voice of delicious purity, which she knows to use with consummate art.)

Laisné married Jules Victor Henri Libent on 20 September 1901 in Paris (8th arrondissement).

== Repertoire ==
- 1893: Sophie in Massenet's Werther, first French production, at the Opéra-Comique, 16 January
- 1893: Geneviève in Alfred Bruneau's L'Attaque du moulin at the Opéra-Comique
- 1894: Created the role of Aurore in Massenet's Le portrait de Manon at the Opéra-Comique, 8 May.
- 1894: Nanette in Verdi's Falstaff at the Opéra-Comique, from 14 November
- 1895: Virginie in Victor Massé's Paul et Virginie at the Opéra-Comique, from 26 February
- 1895: Created the role of Jeanne in Benjamin Godard's La Vivandière at the Opéra-Comique, 1 April
- 1896: Isabelle in Ferdinand Hérold's Le pré aux clercs at the Opéra-Comique, 19 January
- 1896: L'Ombre heureuse in Gluck's Orphée et Eurydice at the Opéra-Comique, 6 March.
- 1897: Created the role of La Duchesse de Fronsac in Henri Hirschmann's L'amour à la Bastille at the Opéra-Comique, 14 December
- 1898: Philomèle in Delibes' Le roi l'a dit at the Opéra-Comique, 13 March
- 1898: Philine in Thomas' Mignon at the Opéra-Comique, 24 April
- 1898: Rafaela in Daniel Auber's Haydée, ou Le secret at the Opéra-Comique, 12 February
- 1898: Virginie in Victor Massé's Paul et Virginie at the Opéra-Comique, 24 November
- 1898: Marceline in Beethoven's Fidelio at the Opéra-Comique, 30 December
- 1899: Henriette in Halévy's L'eclair at the Opéra-Comique, 5 June
- 1899: L'Ombre heureuse in Gluck's Orphée et Eurydice at the Opéra-Comique, 20 December
- 1900: Jeanette in Victor Massé's Les noces de Jeannette at the Opéra-Comique, 7 January
- 1900: Philine in Thomas' Mignon at the Opéra-Comique, 19 January
- 1900: Anna in Boieldieu's La dame blanche at the Opéra-Comique, 2 February
- 1900: Created the role of Henriette in Ernest Lefèvre-Dérodé's Le follet, 1 May
- 1900: Sœur Euphémie in François Devienne's Les Visitandines, 15 May

From 1900, she also appeared as Micaela in Bizet's Carmen, Suzel in Erlanger's Le Juif Polonais, Baucis in Gounod's Philémon et Baucis, and Mimi in Puccini's La bohème.
