= La Vie de bohème (1945 film) =

- Directed by: Marcel L'Herbier
- Written by: Nino Frank; Robert Boissy; Pierre Rocher (dialogue)
- Based on: Scènes de la vie de bohème (1847–49) novel by Henri Murger
- Produced by: André Paulvé; Scalera Film; Cesare Marvasi
- Starring: María Denis; Giselle Pascal; Louis Jourdan
- Cinematography: Pierre Montazel
- Edited by: Suzanne Catelain; Émilienne Nelissen
- Music by: Giacomo Puccini
- Production company: Studios de la Victorine
- Distributed by: DisCina
- Release date: 1945
- Running time: 114 minutes
- Countries: France; Italy
- Language: French

La Vie de bohème is a French-Italian drama film directed by Marcel L'Herbier. It is based on Scènes de la vie de bohème (1851) by Henri Murger and includes music from Giacomo Puccini's opera as accompaniment. The set designs were created by Georges Wakhévitch. It was filmed during the winter of 1942–43 at the Victorine Studios in Nice (then under Italian occupation). However it was not released until January 1945, after the liberation of France.

== Cast ==
- Maria Denis: Mimì
- Louis Jourdan: Rodolfo
- Gisèle Pascal: Musetta
- Alfred Adam: Alexandre Schaunard
- Louis Salou: Colline
- André Roussin: Marcello
- Jean Parédès: Le vicomte
- Suzy Delair: Phémie
