= Christmas Hymns and Carols / You Do Something to Me =

Mario Lanza: Christmas Hymns and Carols / You Do Something to Me

Compilation album by Mario Lanza
- Released: 2004
- Recorded: 1949–1956
- Genre: Opera, Christmas, pop
- Label: BMG Collectables

Christmas Hymns and Carols / You Do Something To Me is a "twofer" disc released in 2004 by the Collectibles label under licence to BMG. It incorporates two original Mario Lanza RCA Camden compilation LPs: Christmas Hymns and Carols and You Do Something To Me.

Christmas Hymns and Carols is a collection of carols and other religious songs recorded between 1950 and 1956. In addition to such familiar standards as "Silent Night" and "Away in a Manger," the compilation also includes "The Lord's Prayer" and the secular "Guardian Angels", the music for which was written by Harpo Marx.

You Do Something To Me is a compilation showcasing Mario Lanza's achievements in a number of genres, ranging from operatic arias to popular ballads. The selections were recorded between 1949 and 1953. Among the arias featured here is "Che gelida manina" from La Boheme, a recording that purportedly inspired conductor Arturo Toscanini to hail Lanza's as "the greatest natural tenor voice of the 20th century." A rare 1951 rendition of "Some Day" from The Vagabond King is also included.
