= Bohemian Manifesto =

2004 book by Laren Stover

Bohemian Manifesto: A Field Guide to Living on the Edge
- Author: Laren Stover
- Illustrator: IZAK
- Language: English
- Genre: Non-fiction
- Publication date: 2004

Bohemian Manifesto: A Field Guide to Living on the Edge is a 2004 book written by Laren Stover and illustrated by IZAK. The book details the eccentricities, peculiarities, and informalities of being a Bohemian. Stover uses prominent Bohemian artist quotes and letters to describe the traditional lives of Bohemians based on five "class" types: Nouveau, Gypsy, Beat, Zen, and Dandy.

== Bohemian types ==
Stover classifies Bohemians into five mindsets/styles. She says Bohemians are "not easily classified like species of birds", noting there are crossovers and hybrids.

=== Nouveau Bohemian ===
The Nouveau Bohemian: This type of Bohemian harmonizes elements of traditional Bohemian ideology with contemporary culture without losing sight of the basic tenets—the glamour, art, and nonconformity. While Nouveaus may suffer poetically, artistically, and romantically, they have what appears to be, at first, one advantage over other Bohemians: the Nouveau has money.

=== Gypsy Bohemian ===
The Gypsy Bohemian: The expatriate types. They are folksy flower children, hippies, psychedelic travelers, fairy folk, dreamers, Deadheads, medievalists, and anachronistic throwbacks. Gypsies don't align with conventions for timeliness and other social norms.

=== Beat Bohemian ===
The Beat Bohemian: Reckless, raggedy, rambling, drifting, down-and-out, Utopia-seeking. It may seem like Beats suffer for their ideals, but they have let go of material desire. Beats are free spirits. They believe in freedom of expression. They travel light, but there is always a book or a notebook in their pocket. Beats jam, improvise, extemporize, blow ethereal notes into the universe, write poetry, ramble and wreck cars. They live on the edge of ideas. They take the part and then make up their own lines.

=== Zen Bohemian ===
The Zen Bohemian: No other Bohemians fathom the transient, green and meditative quality of life better than the Zens, even if they are in a rock band, which they often are. The Zen is post-Beat, a Bohemian whose quest has evolved from the artistic, smoky, literary and spiritual wanderlust to the spiritually lustful.

=== Dandy Bohemian ===
The Dandy Bohemian: A little seedy, a little haughty, slightly shredded or threadbare, dandies are the most polished of all Bohemians, even when their clothes are tattered. The Dandy aspires to old money without the money. You are more likely to find unpopular liqueurs such as Chartreuse and Earl Grey brandy in the Dandy home than a six-pack of Budweiser.

== See also ==
- Bohemian style
- Flâneur
