= Tieste Wilmant =

Italian operatic baritone

Tieste Wilmant (1859–1937) was an Italian operatic baritone. He made his professional opera debut in 1878 in Chiari. In 1896 he originated the role of Marcello in the original production of Giacomo Puccini's La bohème at the Teatro Regio Torino. He made his debut at La Scala in the 1893–1894 season where he appeared in productions of Alfredo Catalani's Loreley and in Puccini's Manon Lescaut. He appeared in performances at La Scala several more times over the next decade including portraying the role of Alberich in the Italy's first performance of Richard Wagner's Siegfried and the role of Iago in Verdi's Otello. Wilmant made four records on the Zonophone record label in 1904.

== Sources ==
- Operissimo.com
