= Che gelida manina =

Tenor aria from Puccini's opera La bohème

"Che gelida manina"
Performed by Beniamino Gigli (1931)

"Che gelida manina" ([ke ˈd͡ʒɛ.li.da maˈni.na]; "What a frozen little hand") is a tenor aria from the first act of Giacomo Puccini's opera, La bohème. The aria is sung by Rodolfo to Mimì when they first meet. In the aria he tells her of his life as a poet, and ends by asking her to tell him more about her life. It is one of the most recorded arias by tenors.

== Dramatic context ==
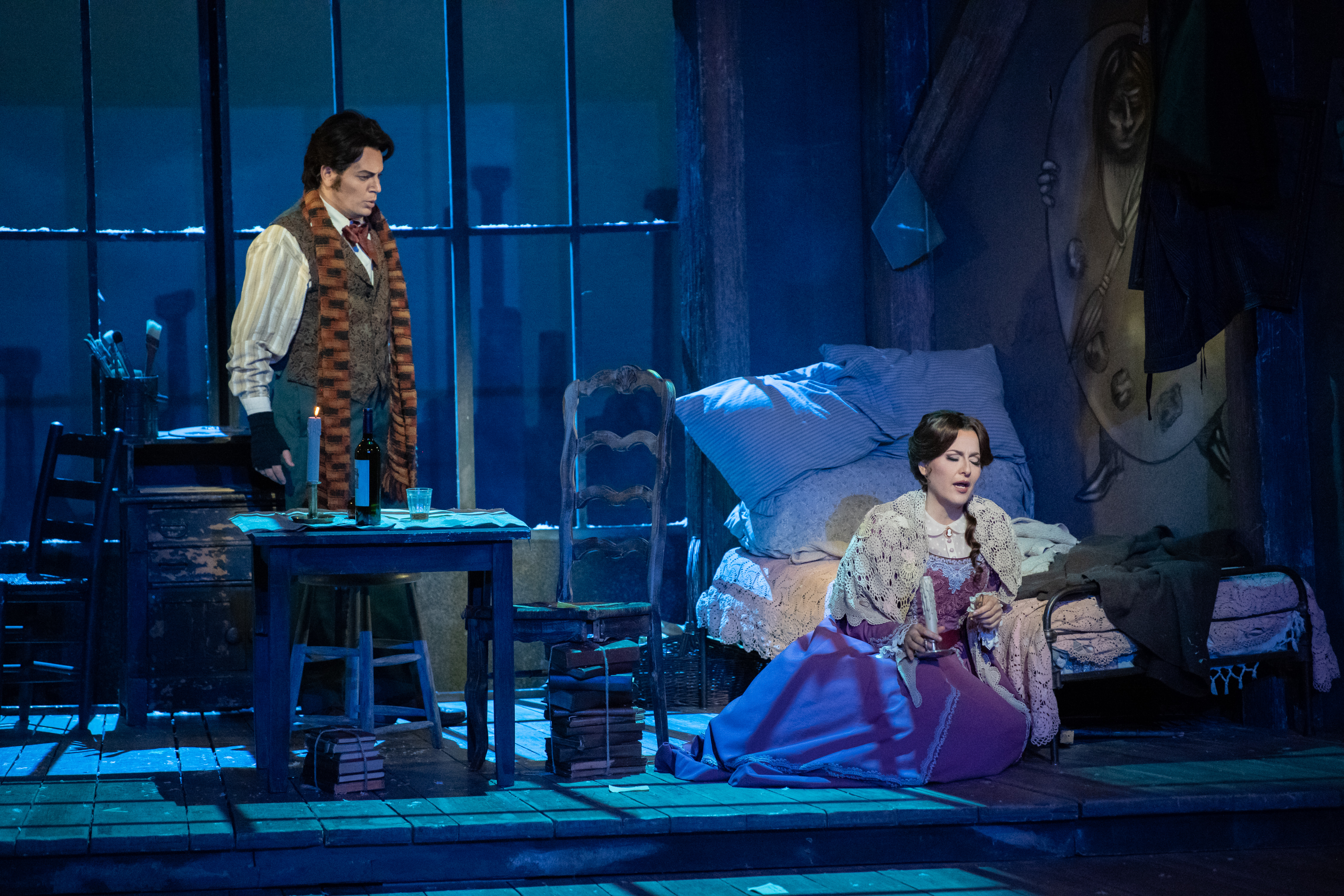
Rodolfo meeting Mimì before the aria

The scene takes place on Christmas Eve in the Latin Quarter of Paris. Rodolfo, a struggling poet, is in his room when he hears someone knocking at the door. He opens the door and sees Mimì, a neighbour who has come to his room because her candle has been extinguished and she needs light to go to her room. While in his room, she feels faint and he helps her to sit, and she accidentally drops her room key. Afterwards, with her candle lit, Mimì starts to leave, but finds her key missing. Both their candles then go out, and the two of them search for her room key together in darkness. Rodolfo finds her key but hides it. Rodolfo then touches her hand in the dark and feels the coldness of her hand, and he starts to sing the aria.

The song begins in a recitative manner with "Che gelida manina, se la lasci riscaldar" ("What a frozen little hand, let me warm it for you"), which quickly turns into an aria. In the song Rodolfo tells Mimì that he is a poet – "Chi son? Sono un poeta" ("Who am I? I am a poet"), talks of his life as a poet living in carefree poverty, and about his hopes and dreams. He then admits that she has stolen his heart, and ends by asking her about her life.

In reply, Mimì sings her aria "Sì, mi chiamano Mimì" ("Yes, they call me Mimì"), and the scene concludes in a duet "O soave fanciulla" where they realise that they have fallen for each other.

== Composition ==
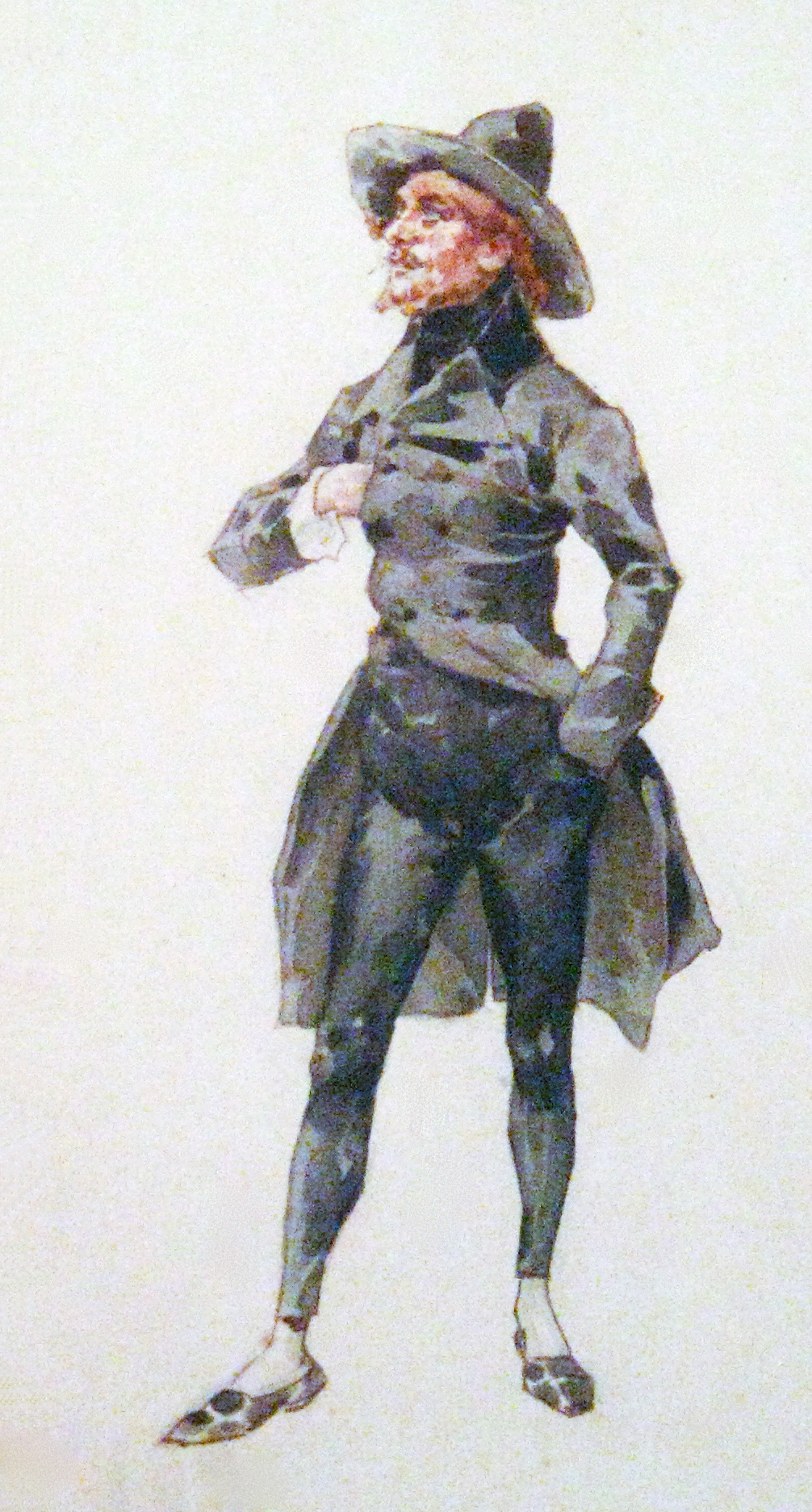
Rodolfo's costume for the premiere at the Teatro Regio in Turin in 1896

The aria was composed by Puccini with libretto by Luigi Illica and Giuseppe Giacosa. It contains an original feature that Puccini introduced – it has three distinct musical paragraphs that lack tonal balance but are nonetheless coherent as a whole. The initial part is tender, the second part (starting with Chi son? Sono un poeta) is distinctly different in tone, bolder and contains a motif for Rodolfo. The third part starts with Talor dal mio forziere, the beginning of the 'love' motif used in the opera.

In the autograph score of the opera, the opening section of the aria and the preceding passage was originally written in C major rather than D-flat major that is used. The song however may be transposed down half a step by those who find the unwritten climactic high C (on speranza) or high tessitura difficult to sing.

== Performances and recordings ==
La bohème is one of the most popular operas, and "Che gelida manina", being the best-known tenor aria of the opera, is consequently one of the most recorded arias by tenors. Between 1900 and 1980, almost 500 tenors recorded this aria in at least seven different languages. The opera premiered in Turin in 1896 with the role of Rodolfo played by Evan Gorga, although Gorga had difficulty with the high tessitura and the music had to be transposed down for him.

Recordings of the aria began a few years after the premiere. An early recording was made by Enrico Caruso in 1906. Caruso had reputedly sung the aria in 1897 for Puccini, who was said to have exclaimed: "Who sent you to me—God?" Beniamino Gigli performed the aria in the 1936 film Ave Maria. The aria was one of Mario Lanza's first recordings in 1949; his recording of "Che gelida manina" won the Operatic Recording of the Year (awarded by the National Record Critics Association), and was later included in RCA's Hall of Fame historical recordings. The first known recording by Luciano Pavarotti is of this aria, recorded in 1961 during his professional debut at the Teatro Municipale in Reggio Emilia. He would record the aria again in 1963 in London. Pavarotti made many notable recordings of the song in his performances of La bohème, including the 1979 La Scala performance and a 1973 recording conducted by Herbert von Karajan.

== Lyrics ==
Che gelida manina,
se la lasci riscaldar.
Cercar che giova?
Al buio non si trova.

Ma per fortuna
è una notte di luna,
e qui la luna
l'abbiamo vicina.

Aspetti, signorina,
le dirò con due parole
chi son, chi son, e che faccio,
come vivo. Vuole?

Chi son? Chi son? Sono un poeta.
Che cosa faccio? Scrivo.
E come vivo? Vivo.

In povertà mia lieta
scialo da gran signore
rime ed inni d'amore.

Per sogni e per chimere
e per castelli in aria,
l'anima ho milionaria.

Talor dal mio forziere
ruban tutti i gioielli
due ladri, gli occhi belli.

V'entrar con voi pur ora,
ed i miei sogni usati
e i bei sogni miei,
tosto si dileguar!

Ma il furto non m'accora,
poiché, poiché v'ha preso stanza
la dolce speranza!

Or che mi conoscete,
parlate voi, deh!
Parlate. Chi siete?
Vi piaccia dir!

Your tiny hand is frozen!
Let me warm it into life.
Our search is useless;
In darkness all is hidden.

Ere long the light
of the moon shall aid us,
Yes, in the moonlight
our search let us continue.

So listen, pretty maiden,
while I tell you in a moment
Just who I am, what I do,
and how I live. Shall I?

I am, I am, I am a poet.
What's my employment? Writing!
Is that a living? Hardly!

I've wit tho' wealth be wanting;
Ladies of rank and fashion
all inspire me with passion.

In dreams and fond illusions
or castles in the air.
Richer is none on earth than I!

Bright eyes as yours, believe me,
Steal my priceless jewels
In Fancy's storehouse cherish'd.

Your roguish eyes have robb'd me,
Of all my dreams bereft me,
dreams that are fair yet fleeting.
Fled are my truant fancies,

Regrets I do not cherish.
For now life's rosy morn is breaking,
now golden love is waking!

Now that I've told my story,
pray tell me yours, too,
tell me frankly, who are you?
Say will you tell?
