= Joseph Hémard =

French artist (1880–1961)

Joseph Hémard (2 August 1880 – 9 August 1961) was a French artist and book illustrator. He was born in Les Mureaux, France, a small town on the Seine, northwest of Paris, on 2 August 1880. He died on 9 August 1961 in Paris. He was a prolific artist. During the early years of the 20th century he published cartoons and comics in illustrated newspapers like Le Pêle-mêle or Le Bon Vivant. He also designed costumes and sets for several operas, patterns for printed textiles, bookbindings, posters and even a facade for a bar in the 1925 Paris Exposition of Decorative Art. His lasting fame, however, lies in his book illustrations – always distinctly French in character and often erotic – which he produced for a great number of titles including many classics of French literature such as Le Malade Imaginaire (1920), Gargantua et Pantagruel (1922), Jacques Le Fataliste (1923), Cyrano de Bergerac (1927), and Aucassin et Nicolette (1936).

Illustration from Henry Murger, Scènes de la Vie de Bohème, 1921.

Illustration from Henry Murger, Scènes de la Vie de Bohème, 1921.

Hémard also provided illustrations – typically humorous cartoon-like drawings – for many unlikely non-fiction works including a variety of technical and reference books. These included drawings for Le Formulaire Magistral, a technical pharmacological manual with formulas for preparing medications, as well as a French grammar and an arithmetic textbook, both of which he also authored, all published in 1927. The following year he published books he wrote and illustrated on French history and geography.

Hémard also published a number of humorously illustrated law codes, including the family law provisions of Le Code Civil, published in 1925, the Code Pénal published in about 1929, and, in 1944, he published a lengthy, illustrated tax code of France, the Code Général des Impôts Directs et Taxes Assimilées, all published in Paris.

The illustrations in these three works, along with many others of Hémard's, were printed in color using the "pochoir" (French for stencil) method in which stencils for each color to be printed are hand cut, typically out of celluloid or plastic, and the colors painted on using special brushes. Pochoir produces intensely colored prints with a distinct fresh look and is best known for its use in French Art Nouveau and Art Deco prints in the early 20th century.

Hémard wrote a brief autobiographical essay, published by Babou and Kahane in French in 1928 and in English translation in 1929, which is largely devoid of factual detail. For example, after a random history of several "Hémards", purportedly his ancestors, ending with his birth and two paragraphs on his childhood, he states, "And then I drew for books." Hémard said that he spent four and a half years as a prisoner of war in Germany during World War I, and must have been captured shortly after the war began. Hémard had his most prolific period of book illustrations in the 1920s and 1930s. Although he remained in Paris and continued to work as an illustrator during the War, his anti-Nazi sentiments were expressed in illustrations and stories he contributed to a collection of humorous stories about the Occupation. Hémard continued his work at a reduced level after the War. In 1947, for example, he illustrated an edition of Brillat-Savarin's classic work on gastronomy, Physiologie du Goût ("Physiology of Taste").
