= O soave fanciulla =

Duet from the opera La bohème by Giacomo Puccini

"O soave fanciulla"
Enrico Caruso, Nellie Melba (1907)

"O soave fanciulla" ("O gentle maiden") is a romantic duet from the first act of Giacomo Puccini's 1896 opera La bohème. It is sung as the closing number in act 1 by Rodolfo (tenor) and Mimì (soprano) where they realise they have fallen for each other.

== Music ==
The duet, between 5 and 6 minutes in length, is written in the common time time signature, the key of A major, but ending in C major. The last bar in the orchestra is characterized by descending harp harmonics through the final C major chord.

When Mimì and Rodolfo realize they are in love (unison "A! tu sol comandi, amor!"/"Fremon già nell'anima"), the music returns to the opera's love leitmotif from Rodolfo's aria "Che gelida manina" (talor dal mio forziere). They leave the stage together singing Amor!. Mimì's last note is a high C, marked perdendosi (fading away), and while an E below is written for Rodolfo, many tenors also sing the high C, making the last note unison. Following Rodolfo's "Che gelida manina" and Mimì's "Sì, mi chiamano Mimì", the duet concludes one of the most romantic passages in all of opera.

== Libretto ==
The libretto is by Luigi Illica and Giuseppe Giacosa. Rodolfo and Mimì have met for the first time a few minutes ago. He told her about his life ("Che gelida manina"), and asked her to tell him about hers ("Sì, mi chiamano Mimì"). In this duet, "O soave fanciulla", they realize that they have fallen in love.

Rodolfo's friends call him to join them but he would rather stay with Mimì, but she shyly suggests they all go out together. Rodolfo remarks how cold it is outside, but Mimì promises to stay near to him. She leaves the possibility of a later return to the garret open. They leave the stage.

Italian lyrics

Mimì si è avvicinata ancor più alla finestra per modo che i raggi lunari la illuminano: Rodolfo, volgendosi, scorge Mimì avvolta come da un nimbo di luce, e la contempla, quasi estatico.
Rodolfo:
O soave fanciulla, o dolce viso
di mite circonfuso alba lunar,
in te, ravviso
il sogno ch'io vorrei sempre sognar!

Entrambi
M: Ah, tu sol comandi, amor!
R: Fremon già nell'anima
le dolcezze estreme

Mimì: assai commossa Tu sol comandi, amore!

Entrambi Rodolfo cingendo colle braccia Mimì
R: Fremon nell'anima
dolcezze estreme,
fremon dolcezze estreme,
M: quasi abbandonandosi
Oh come dolci scendono
le sue lusinghe al core...

Insieme
M: Tu sol comandi, amor!
R: nel bacio freme amor!
Rodolfo bacia Mimì

Mimì: svincolandosi No per pieta!
Rodolfo: Sei mia!

Mimì: V'aspettan gli amici...
Rodolfo: Gia mi mandi via?

Mimì: titubante Vorrei dir... ma non oso.
Rodolfo: con gentilezza Di'...

Mimì: con graziosa furberia
Se venissi con voi?

Rodolfo: sorpreso Che? Mimì!
insinuante
Sarebbe cosi dolce restar qui.
C'e freddo fuori.

Mimì: con grande abbandono
Vi staro vicina!

Rodolfo: E al ritorno?
Mimì: maliziosa Curioso!

Rodolfo: Aiuta amorosamente Mimì a mettersi lo scialle
Dammi il braccio, o mia piccina...
Mimì: Dà il braccio a Rodolfo
Obbedisco, signor!
S'avviano sottobraccio alla porta d'uscita

Rodolfo: Che m'ami...di...
Mimì: con abbandono Io t'amo.

Insieme Amor! Amor! Amor!

Literal translation

At the window, Mimì is illuminated by the moon's rays. Turning, Rodolfo sees Mimì wrapped in a halo of moonlight. He contemplates her, in ecstasy.
Rodolfo:
Oh lovely girl, oh sweet face
bathed in the soft moonlight,
I see you in a dream
I'd dream forever!

Both
M: Ah! Love, you rule alone!
R: Already the soul trembles
extreme kindness

Mimì: very moved Ah! Love, you rule alone!

Both Rodolfo putting his arms around her
R: The soul trembles
the heights of tenderness
trembling are the heights of tenderness
M: almost surrendering
How sweet his flatteries
enter my heart...

Together
M: You rule alone, oh love!
R: Love trembles at our kiss!
kisses her

Mimì: freeing herself No, I beg you!
Rodolfo: You're mine now!

Mimì: Your friends are still waiting...
Rodolfo: So soon must I leave you?

Mimì: hesitant I dare not... say what I'd like.
Rodolfo: with kindness Tell me?

Mimì: with graceful cleverness
If I came with you?

Rodolfo: surprised What? Mimì!
insinuating
It would be so fine to stay here.
It's freezing outside.

Mimì: with great abandon
I'd be right beside you!

Rodolfo: What about later?
Mimì: mischievous Who knows?

Rodolfo: helping lovingly Mimì to put on her shawl
Take my arm, my dear young lady...
Mimì: gives Rodolfo her arm
I obey, my dear sir!
they exit arm in arm

Rodolfo: Do you love me, say...
Mimì: with abandon I love you..

Together Love! Love! Love!

Singable translation

Rodolfo:
Lovely maid in the moonlight,
Your face entrancing like radiant seraph from on high appears
As thus I watch you,
The dream that I would ever dream returns.

Both
M: Love alone o'er hearts has sway ...
R: Heart to heart, and soul to soul
love binds us in his fetters.

Mimì: Ah love, to thee do we surrender

Both
R: Love now shall
rule our hearts alone
shall rule our hearts alone
M:
Sweet to my soul
the magic voice of love its music chanteth

Together
Life's fairest flower is love ...

Mimì: No, I pray you!
Rodolfo: My sweethart!

Mimì: Your comrades await you.
Rodolfo: Do you then dismiss me?

Mimì: I should like no, I dare not ...
Rodolfo: Say!

Mimì:
Could I not come with you?

Rodolfo: What? Mimì!

It would be much more pleasant here to stay,
Outside it's chilly.

Mimì:
I'll be always near you!

Rodolfo: On returning?
Mimì: Who knows, sir?

Rodolfo:
Take my arm, my little maiden
Mimì:
Very well, I obey.

Rodolfo: You love me? Say ...
Mimì: I love thee.

Both My love!
