= Henri Hirschmann =

French composer

- Born: Henri Herblay; 30 April 1872; Saint-Mandé
- Died: 3 November 1961 (aged 89); Paris
- Occupation: Musician

Henri Hirschmann, real name Henri Herblay (30 April 1872 – 3 November 1961), was a French composer of light music.

Originally a student of André Gedalge at the Conservatoire de Paris, he studied under Jules Massenet for two years. His best known work is La Petite Bohème, from the novel Scènes de la vie de bohème by Henri Murger, which premiered 19 January 1905 at the Théâtre des Variétés in Paris.

In 1893 he was awarded the Prix Rossini by the French Académie des Beaux-Arts.

== Main works ==
- 1897: Amour à la Bastille
- Lovelace
- 1904: Les Hirondelles
- 1905: La Petite Bohème, libretto by Paul Ferrier after Murger, théâtre des Variétés
- 1905: Rolande
- 1906: Vers les Étoiles, ballet, Olympia (Paris)
- 1908: Hernani
- 1911: La Danseuse de Tanagra
