= Le portrait de Manon =

Opera by Jules Massenet

- Opéra comique by Jules Massenet
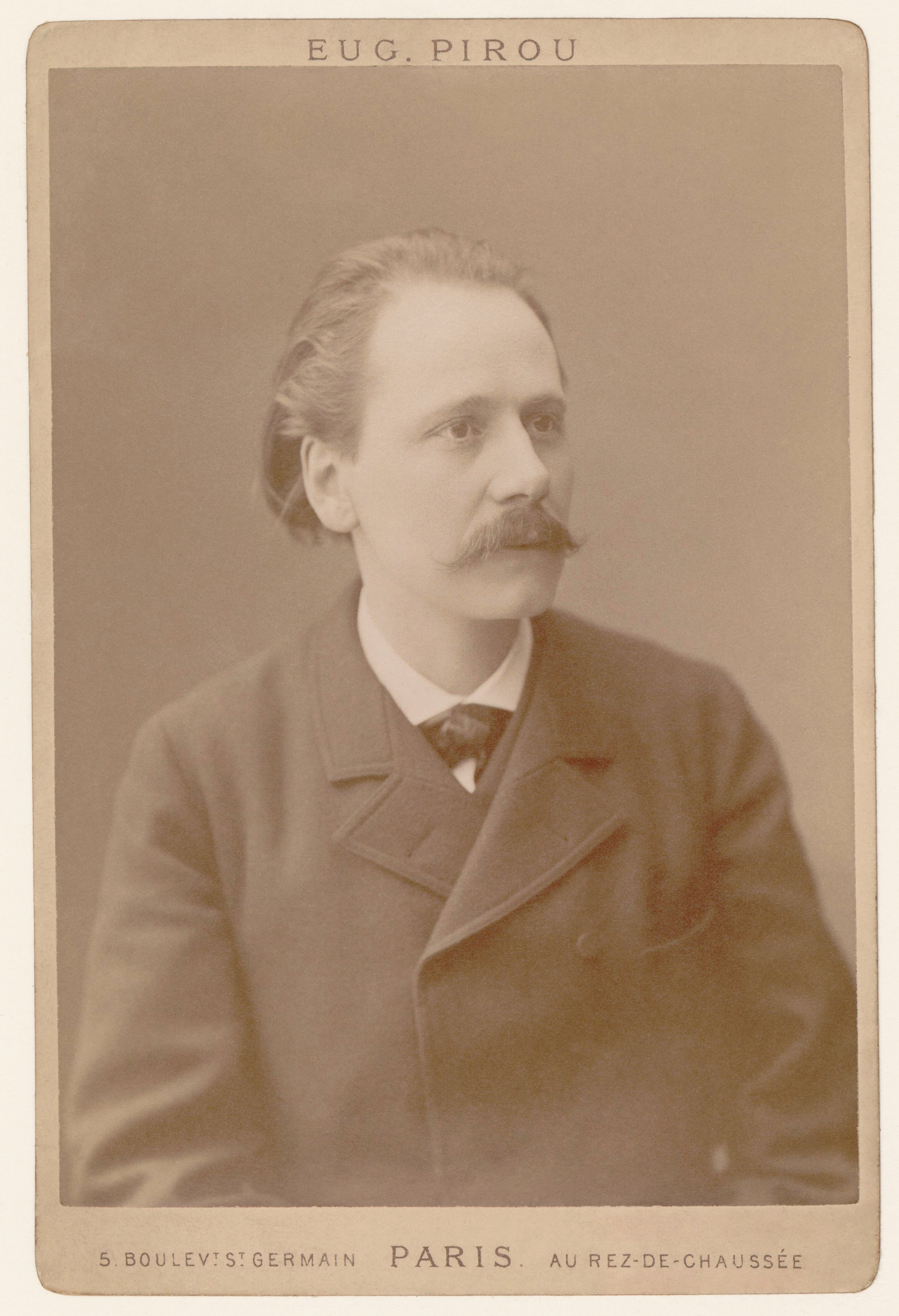
- The composer in 1895
- Librettist: Georges Boyer
- Language: French
- Premiere: 8 May 1894; Opéra-Comique, Paris

Le portrait de Manon is an opéra comique in one act by Jules Massenet to a French libretto by Georges Boyer. It is related to Massenet's 1884 opera Manon, widely regarded to be his masterpiece. However, Le portrait de Manon is rarely performed today.

== Performance history ==
The opera was first performed at the Opéra Comique in Paris on 8 May 1894. After its premiere the work was performed at La Monnaie in November 1894 and the Teatro del Fondo in Naples in December 1894. The work received its United States premiere at the French Opera House in New Orleans in 1895. It was also produced at The Waldorf-Astoria Hotel on 13 December 1897. The Opéra Comique revived the opera in 1900 and it was mounted at the Théâtre Lyrique in September 1922, after which the work fell out of the performance repertory. After a more than 60-year absence from the stage, Le portrait de Manon was mounted at La Fenice on 13 April 1985. Four years later the Opéra de Monte-Carlo staged the work. The opera was most recently revived by the Glimmerglass Opera in 2005. In 2014 "kultur.theater.musik" produced the first performance in German (as Das Bildnis der Manon) at the 'Sommeroper im Amthof' festival in Feldkirchen, Carinthia, and in other theatres in Lower Austria.

== Roles ==
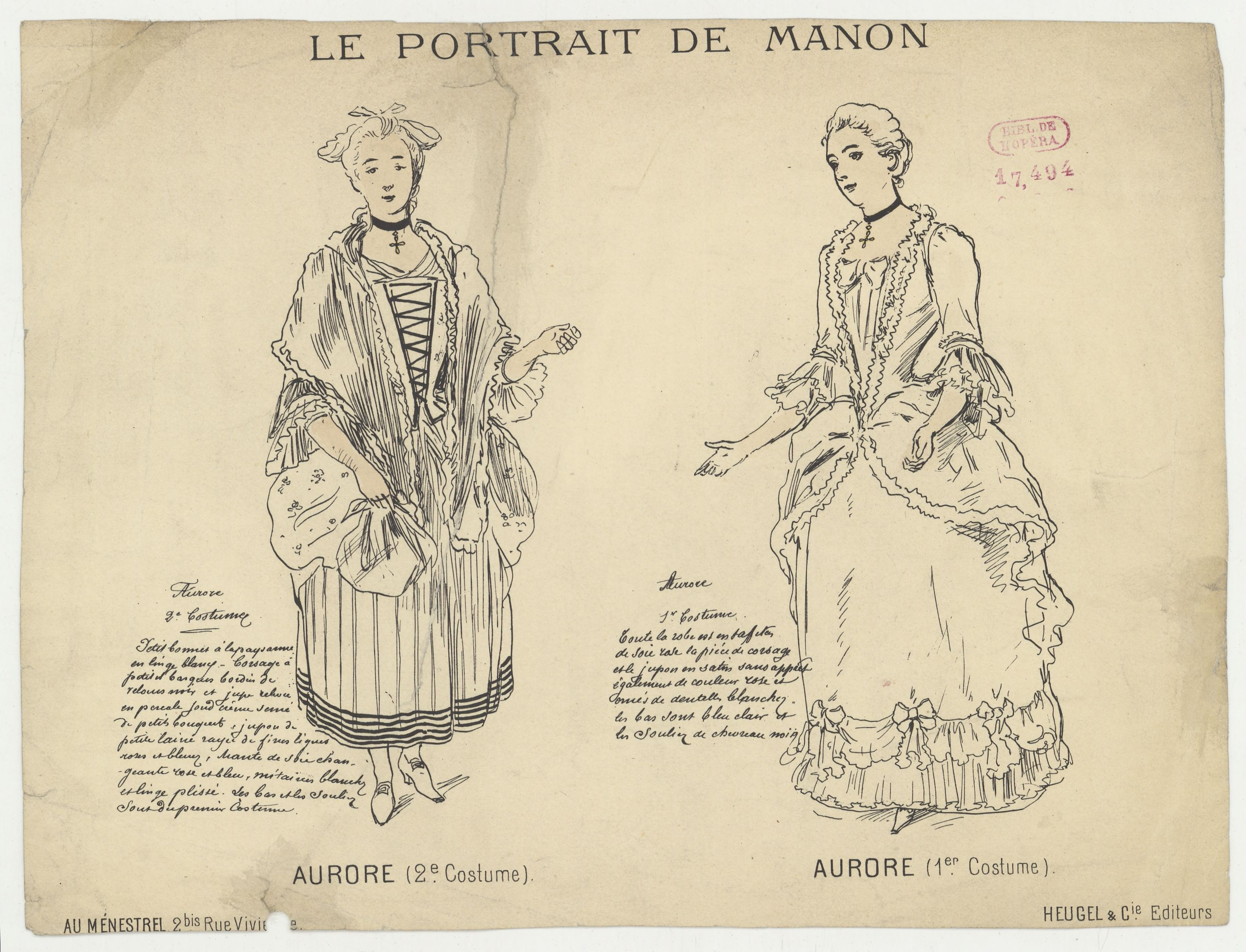
Costumes for Aurore

| Role | Voice type | Premiere Cast, 8 May 1894 (Conductor: Jules Danbé) |
|---|---|---|
| Des Grieux | baritone | Lucien Fugère |
| Tiberge | tenor | Pierre Grivot |
| Jean de Moncerf | mezzo-soprano | Suzanne Elven |
| Aurore | soprano | Jeanne Laisné |

== Synopsis ==
The opera opens with a chorus of peasants singing outside the home of the Chevalier Des Grieux. They remind him of his own happier days and he looks at his miniature portrait of Manon. His nephew Jean arrives for a history lesson but tells Des Grieux that he is in love with Aurore. Des Grieux believes that the young girl, who is neither of noble birth nor rich, is unworthy of Jean.

Tiberge tries to persuade his old friend Des Grieux to allow young love to run its course.

Aurore and Jean are in despair. Jean tries to snatch a kiss from her but in the process knocks against a chest and the portrait of Manon falls out and the pair admire the portrait. Tiberge calls Aurore away. Des Grieux lectures Jean again and sends him away. Aurore appears wearing the dress that Manon wore when she first met Des Grieux in Amiens. Tiberge reveals that Aurore is the niece of Manon, the daughter of her brother Lescaut. Des Grieux yields to his arguments and consents to Jean's marriage to Aurore.
