= La bohème (Leoncavallo) =

Opera by Ruggero Leoncavallo

- Opera by Ruggero Leoncavallo
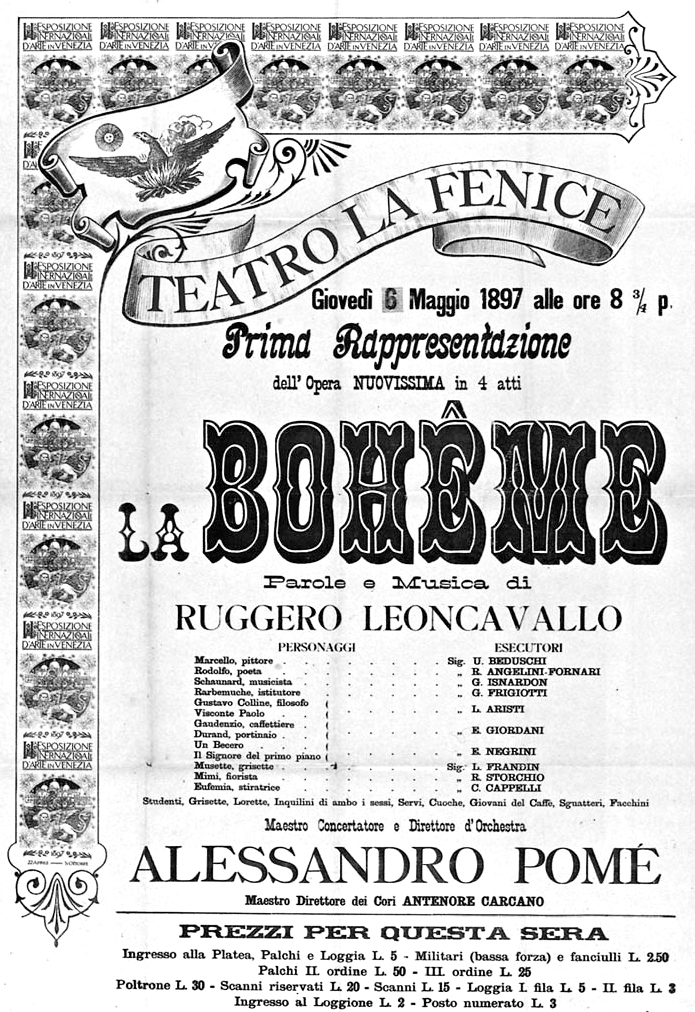
- Poster for the premiere
- Librettist: Leoncavallo
- Language: Italian
- Based on: Scènes de la vie de bohème by Henri Murger
- Premiere: 6 May 1897; La Fenice, Venice

La bohème is an Italian opera in four acts, with music and libretto by Ruggero Leoncavallo, based on Scènes de la vie de bohème (1851) by Henri Murger. The opera received a successful premiere at the Teatro la Fenice, Venice, on 6 May 1897.

Leoncavallo wrote his opera La bohème contemporaneously with Giacomo Puccini's own treatment of the same story. Leoncavallo later revised the work, titling it Mimì Pinson, but despite initial respect, it did not survive. Puccini's version has become a standard in the operatic repertoire, whereas Leoncavallo's opera is rarely performed. Leoncavallo's version did not receive its UK premiere until May 1970.

Allan Atlas has analysed in detail the different treatments of the death of the Mimì character in both Leoncavallo's and Puccini's versions of La bohème, contrasting the historical success of Puccini's opera and the relative failure of Leoncavallo's.

== Roles ==
Roles, voice types, premier cast
Role	Voice type	Premiere cast, 6 May 1897 Conductor: Alessandro Pomè
Schaunard, a musician	baritone	Jacques [Gianni] Isnardon
Marcello, a painter	tenor	Giovanni Beduschi
Rodolfo, a poet	baritone	Rodolfo Angelini-Fornari
Mimì	soprano	Rosina Storchio
Musetta	mezzo-soprano	Elisa "Lison" Frandin
Gaudenzio	tenor	Enrico Giordani
Loafer	tenor	
Colline, a philosopher	bass	Lucio Aristi
Eufemia	mezzo-soprano	Clelia Cappelli
Barbemuche	bass	Giuseppe Frigiotti
Durand	tenor	Enrico Giordani
Students, working girls, townsfolk, shopkeepers, street-vendors, soldiers, waiters, women and children – chorus

== Synopsis ==
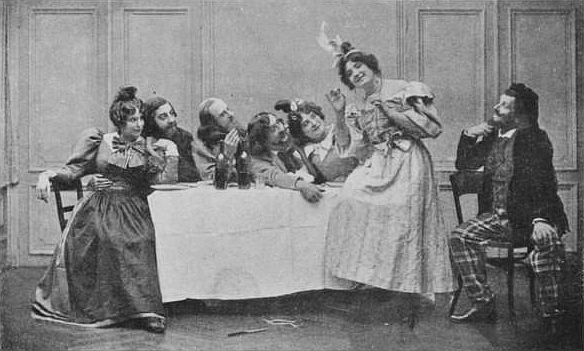
Scene from La bohème at the Théâtre de la Renaissance in Paris on 10 October 1899

Place: Paris.
Time: one year from Christmas, 1837 to Christmas, 1838.

=== Act 1 ===
Café Momus

The innkeeper Gaudenzio tries in vain to eject the Bohemians, who never pay and are continually up to no good. During the conversation another piece of horseplay on their part is discovered. They sit down to dine, while Musette gaily sings. (Canzonette: "Mimì is the name of my sweet blonde.") Naturally when they are asked to pay the bill, they have no money. A comic fight ensues between them and the innkeeper, who has called his servants to assist him. It is ended by Barbemuche, who offers to pay the bill.

=== Act 2 ===
The courtyard of Musette's house

"Io non ho che una povera stanzetta"
From act 2; sung by Enrico Caruso

Musette's lover has left her, refusing any longer to pay her debts. In consequence, her furniture has been confiscated and is carried down to the courtyard. When this has been done, she returns home. She expects guests but cannot entertain them in any other way than by receiving them in the courtyard. Here the Bohemians, who arrive in large numbers, celebrate joyously. The neighbours, awakened from sleep, protest in vain and the scene ends in a general fight between the two factions.

=== Act 3 ===
Marcello's garret room

Musette, who can no longer bear the sufferings of hunger and want, determines to leave Marcello. During the festivities in the courtyard, Mimì has allowed herself to be carried off by Count Paul, but she returns, motivated by love for Rodolfo. Musette begs her to go with her, but she refuses. Angrily, Marcello and Rodolfo force both women to leave the apartment.

=== Act 4 ===
Rodolfo's garret room

Mimì returns to Rodolfo, at the brink of death. Musette, who accidentally meets her there, sacrifices her jewels to procure fuel to warm the room for Mimì. As the Christmas chimes are heard, Mimì dies.

== Noted arias ==
- "Musette!...Testa adorata" (Marcello)
- "Io non ho che una povera stanzetta" (Marcello)
- "Musette svaria sulla bocca viva" (Mimì)
- "Da quel suon soavemente" (Musette)
- "Scuoti, o vento fra i sibili" (Rodolfo)
- "Mimi Pinson la biondinetta" (Musette)

== Recordings ==
Year	Cast: Schaunard, Marcello, Rodolfo, Mimì, Musette	Conductor, chorus and orchestra	Label
1958	Walter Monachesi, Doro Antonioli, Ettore Bastianini, Mafalda Masini, Rosetta Noli	Francesco Molinari-Pradelli, Teatro di San Carlo Chorus and Orchestra (Naples)	CD: Myto Cat: 169
1964	Orazio Gualtiero, Antonio Annaloro, Guido Mazzini, Mazza Medici, Nedda Casei	Alberto Zedda, Orchestra Filarmonica de Sanremo, Coro del Teatro Comunale di Bologna	LP: Cetra Cat: 1269
1975	Jacques Trigeau, Alain Vanzo, Robert Currier-Christesen, Edith Tremblay, Anita Terzian	Nino Bonavolantà, Orchestre Lyrique de l'O.R.T.F., Chorale Lyrique de l'O.R.T.F.	CD: DPV Cat: 30.9010
1981	Alan Titus, Franco Bonisolli, Bernd Weikl, Lucia Popp, Alexandrina Milcheva	Heinz Wallberg, Bavarian Radio Symphony Chorus, Munich Symphony Orchestra	CD: Orfeo Cat: 23822
1990	Bruno Praticò, Mario Malagnini, Jonathan Summers, Lucia Mazzaria, Martha Senn	Jan Latham-Koenig, Teatro La Fenice Chorus and Orchestra (Venice)	CD: Nuova Era Cat: 223304
2002	Urban Malmberg, Mikail Davidoff, Vittorio Vitelli, Juanita Lascarro, Katia Lytting	Marco Guidarini, Klangbogen Wien	DVD Premiere Opera Cat: 6601
