= William Paull (baritone) =

British baritone

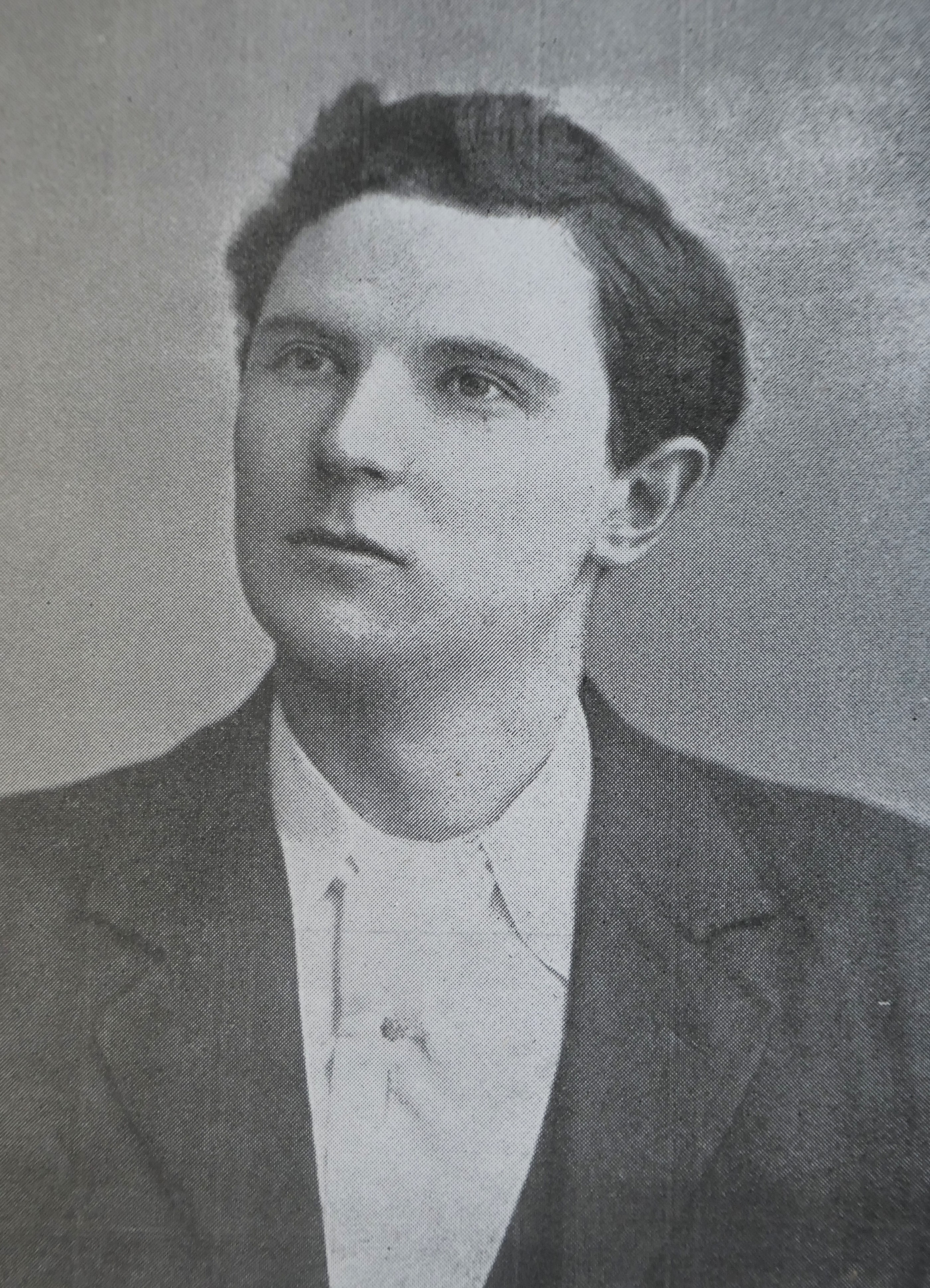

William Paull (c. 1872 – 5 February 1903) was a British baritone at the turn of the 20th century. He was born in Cornwall, UK, in c. 1872. He had a wide repertoire ranging from opera and oratorio to the popular ballads of his day and was becoming well regarded as a soloist, when in 1903 at about the age of 30, his life was cut short by an accident whilst on tour in the US.

== Professional career ==
His earliest known professional connection was with the Carl Rosa Opera Company in England. From 1898 to 1899 he toured Australia with a concert company headed by Dame Emma Albani – his first appearance there being on 16 March 1898.

Secured by the Australian actor and theatre manager J.C. Williamson as principal baritone of his Royal Comic Opera Company (formed in 1880), Paull made his first appearance as King Henri in Paul Lacôme's opéra comique, Ma mie Rosette. He played a number of different parts with this company. Also on this tour he met his wife-to-be, Ethel Gordon, in Sydney. In Adelaide he then severed his connection with Williamson's company.

His first US appearance was in c.1900 as Wolfram in Wagner's Tannhäuser with the Metropolitan English Opera Company which was managed by Henry Wilson Savage and Maurice Grau. This company had been set up to perform operas in English. However, after its failure he returned to England, where he continued to work for Savage.

In 1901 he joined the Castle Square Opera Company as leading baritone and toured the US again. Ethel Gordon travelled 15,000 miles to marry him there.

In 1902 he performed in two concerts conducted by Henry Wood at the Queen's Hall in London – Wolfram's Tournament Song from Wagner's Tannhäuser, "Blick ich umher" (When I cast my eye around), Act 2, Scene 4 (13 January) and the cavatina from Gounod's Faust, "Avant de quitter ces lieux" (Even bravest heart may swell) Act 2 (31 January).

He returned to the US in 1903 and gave a number of concerts with the Castle Square Opera Company at the Century Theatre in St Louis. It was there on 5 February while staying at the Southern Hotel that he fell from his sixth floor window, and although his fall was broken by telegraph wires opposite the second floor, he never regained consciousness after hitting the ground. It was presumed that he had lost his balance while leaning from the window and so this was considered to have been an accident.

== Recordings ==
In 1901 and 1902 he recorded approximately 70 single-sided records for the Gramophone & Typewriter Ltd (the forerunner of His Master's Voice) at their studio in 31 Maiden Lane, London WC2. Below is a selection which shows the variety of his recorded repertoire:

- "Bedouin Love Song", Ciro Pinsuti, recorded 1901
- "O Star of Eve", Tannhauser, Wagner, recorded 1901
- "In Happy Moments", Maritana, William Vincent Wallace, recorded 1901
- "The Mikado's Song", The Mikado, Gilbert & Sullivan, recorded 1901
- "The Deathless Army", Henry Trotere, recorded 1902
- "Why do the Nations so Furiously Rage Together" The Messiah, Handel, recorded 1902
- "For the mountains Shall Depart", Elijah, Felix Mendelssohn, recorded 1902
- "Excelsior" (with Wills-Page – tenor), Michael William Balfe, recorded 1902
