= Scenes of Bohemian Life =

1851 written work by Henri Murger

Illustration by Joseph Hémard made for a 1921 edition of the work

Scenes of Bohemian Life (original French title: Scènes de la vie de bohème [sɛn də la vi də bɔɛm]) is a work by Henri Murger, published in 1851. Although it is commonly called a novel, it does not follow standard novel form. Rather, it is a collection of loosely related stories, all set in the Latin Quarter of Paris in the 1840s, romanticizing bohemian life in a playful way. Most of the stories were originally published individually in a local literary magazine, Le Corsaire. Many of them were semi-autobiographical, featuring characters based on actual individuals who would have been familiar to some of the magazine's readers.

== Original publication ==
The first of these stories was published in March 1845, carrying the byline "Henri Mu..ez". A second story followed more than a year later, in May 1846. This time Murger signed his name "Henry Murger", spelling his first name with a "y" in imitation of the English name, an affectation he continued for the rest of his career. A third story followed in July, with the subtitle "Scènes de la bohème". The same subtitle was used with 18 more stories, which continued to appear on a semi-regular basis until early 1849 (with a long break in 1848 for the revolution in Paris).

== Production ==
Although the stories were popular within the small literary community, they initially failed to reach a larger audience or generate much income for Murger. This changed in 1849, after Murger was approached by Théodore Barrière, an up-and-coming young playwright, who proposed writing a play based on the stories. Murger agreed to the collaboration, and the result – titled La Vie de la bohème, credited to Barrière and Murger as co-authors – was staged to great success, premiering at the Théâtre des Variétés on November 9, 1849.

The popularity of the play created a demand for publication of the stories. Murger therefore compiled most of the stories into a single collection. To help establish continuity, he added some new material. A preface discussed the meaning of "bohemian", and a new first chapter served to introduce the setting and the main characters. To the end were added two more chapters which wrap up some loose ends and offer final thoughts on the bohemian life. This became the novel, published in January 1851. A second edition was published later in the year, in which Murger added one more story. The late nineteenth century English novelist George Gissing claimed in 1890 to be reading the novel, in French, for the 'twentieth time'.

== Translations ==
=== English ===
- Vizetelly (Translator). The Bohemians of the Latin Quarter. London (1888).
- Symons, Arthur (Introduction); Marriage, Ellen; and Selwyn, John (Translators). The Latin Quarter. New York: Doubleday (1901) (review).
- Ives, George B. (Translator). Bohemian Life. London: The Lorraine Press (1926).
- Lewis, D. B. Wyndham (Introduction); Hitchcock Jr., Henry Russell (Illustrator); Hugus, Elizabeth Ward (Translator). Latin Quarter: Scènes de la Vie de Bohème. New York: Dodd, Mead & Co. (1930)
- Sadleir, Michael (Introduction); Masterman, Dodie (Illustrator); Cameron, Norman (Translator). Vie de Bohème. London: The Folio Society (1960).
- Samuels, Maurice (Introduction); Marriage, Ellen; and Selwyn, John (Translators). Bohemians of the Latin Quarter. University of Pennsylvania Press (2004).
- Holton, Robert (Introduction and translation). Scenes of Bohemian Life. Anthem Press (2023).

== Adaptations ==
Two operas were later based on the novel and play, La bohème by Giacomo Puccini in 1896 and La bohème by Ruggero Leoncavallo in 1897. Puccini's became one of the most popular operas of all time, spawning several later works based on the same story.

=== Works involving the La bohème theme ===
- La bohème – opera by Giacomo Puccini, 1896
- La bohème – opera by Ruggero Leoncavallo, 1897
- Bohemios – zarzuela by Amadeo Vives, 1904
- La Petite Bohème – operetta by Henri Hirschmann (pseudonym for Henri Herblay), 1905
- Mimi- play by "Olive Conway" (pseudonym for Harold Brighouse), 1927
- La Bohème, a 1916 American silent film starring Alice Brady and directed by Albert Capellani
- La Bohème – an MGM silent film starring Lillian Gish and John Gilbert, 1926
- Mimi – British film starring Gertrude Lawrence, 1935
- La Vie de bohème – French film directed by Marcel L'Herbier, 1945
- La Bohème – 1965 West German film of Puccini's opera, directed by Franco Zeffirelli
- La Vie de Bohème – jazz album by pianist Dave Burrell, 1969
- The Bohemians - A play for radio 4 by David Nathan, 1983
- La Vie de bohème – film directed by Aki Kaurismäki, 1992
- Rent – musical by Jonathan Larson including the song *"La Vie Bohème", 1996
- Moulin Rouge! – 2001 film by Baz Luhrmann with parts of its plot based on the original story
- La Vida Bohème – alternative rock band from Venezuela, founded in 2006
