= La bohème =

1896 opera by Giacomo Puccini

- Opera by Giacomo Puccini
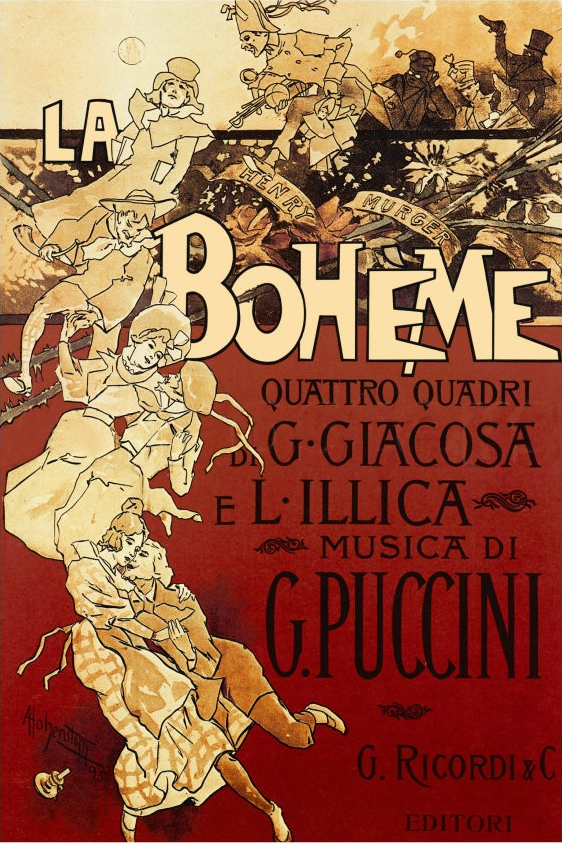
- Original 1896 poster by Adolfo Hohenstein
- Librettist: Luigi Illica; Giuseppe Giacosa
- Language: Italian
- Based on: Henri Murger's Scènes de la vie de bohème
- Premiere: 1 February 1896; Teatro Regio, Turin

La bohème (/ˌlɑː boʊˈɛm/ LAH boh-EM, Italian: [la boˈɛm]) is an opera in four acts, (Note: Puccini called the divisions quadri, tableaux or "images", rather than atti (acts).) composed by Giacomo Puccini between 1893 and 1895 to an Italian libretto by Luigi Illica and Giuseppe Giacosa, based on Scènes de la vie de bohème (1851) by Henri Murger. The story is set in Paris around 1830 and shows the Bohemian lifestyle (known in French as "la bohème") of a poor seamstress and her artist friends.

The world premiere of La bohème was on 1 February 1896 at the Teatro Regio in Turin, conducted by the 28-year-old Arturo Toscanini. Since then, La bohème has become part of the standard Italian opera repertory and is one of the most frequently performed operas worldwide.

In 1946, 50 years after the opera's premiere, Toscanini conducted a commemorative performance of it on radio with the NBC Symphony Orchestra. A recording of the performance was later released by RCA Victor on vinyl record, tape and compact disc. It is the only recording ever made of a Puccini opera by its original conductor.

== Origin of the story ==
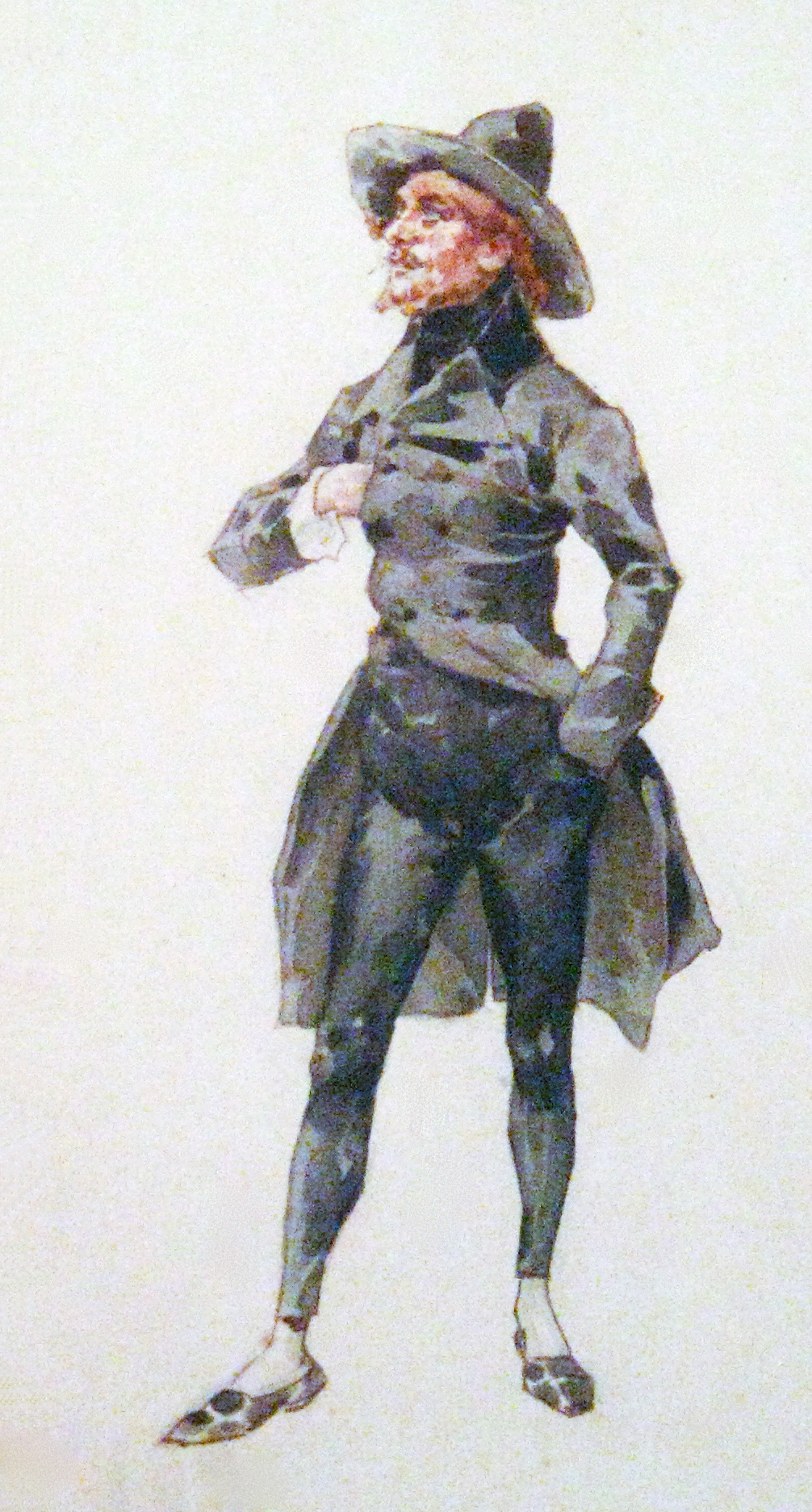
Rodolfo, costume design by Adolfo Hohenstein for the premiere at the Teatro Regio, 1896

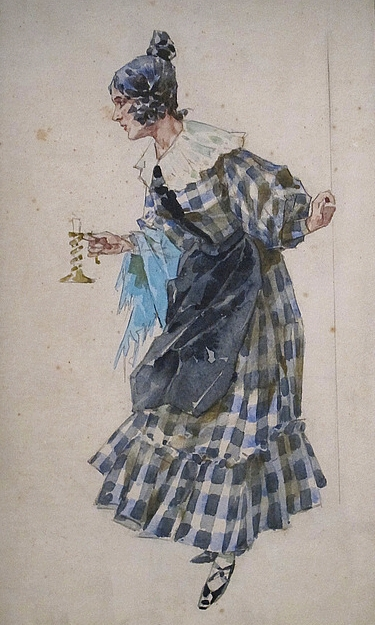
Mimì's costume for the premiere

As credited on its title page, the libretto of La bohème is based on Henri Murger's 1851 novel, Scènes de la vie de bohème, a collection of vignettes portraying young bohemians living in Paris in the 1840s. Although often called a novel, the book has no unified plot. Like the 1849 play drawn from the book by Murger and Théodore Barrière, the opera's libretto focuses on the relationship between Rodolfo and Mimì, ending with her death. Also like the play, the libretto combines two characters from the novel, Mimì and Francine, into the single character of Mimì. Early in the composition stage Puccini was in dispute with the composer Ruggero Leoncavallo, who said that he had offered Puccini a completed libretto and felt that Puccini should defer to him. Puccini responded that he had had no idea of Leoncavallo's interest and that having been working on his own version for some time, he felt that he could not oblige him by abandoning the opera. Leoncavallo completed his own version in which Marcello was sung by a tenor and Rodolfo by a baritone. It was not as successful as Puccini's and is now rarely performed.

Much of the libretto is original. Major sections of acts two and three are the librettists' invention, with only a few passing references to incidents and characters in Murger. Most of acts one and four follow the book, piecing together episodes from various chapters. The final scenes in acts one and four—the scenes with Rodolfo and Mimì—resemble both the play and the book. The story of their meeting closely follows chapter 18 of the book, in which the two lovers living in the garret are not Rodolphe and Mimì at all, but rather Jacques and Francine. The story of Mimì's death in the opera draws from two different chapters in the book, one relating Francine's death and the other relating Mimì's.

The published libretto includes a note from the librettists briefly discussing their adaptation. Without mentioning the play directly, they defend their conflation of Francine and Mimì into a single character: "Chi può non confondere nel delicato profilo di una sola donna quelli di Mimì e di Francine?" ("Who cannot confuse in the delicate profile of one woman the personality both of Mimì and of Francine?"). At the time, the book was in the public domain, Murger having died without heirs, but rights to the play were still controlled by Barrière's heirs.

== Performance history and reception ==
=== Initial success ===
The first performance of La bohème took place in Turin on 1 February 1896 at the Teatro Regio and was conducted by the young Arturo Toscanini. The role of Rodolfo was played by Evan Gorga with Cesira Ferrani as Mimì, but Gorga was unable to accommodate the high tessitura and the music had to be transposed down for him. The initial response of the audience at the first performance was subdued and critical responses were polarized. Despite this varied introductory response, the opera quickly became popular throughout Italy and productions were soon mounted by the following companies: The Teatro di San Carlo (14 March 1896, with Elisa Petri as Musetta and Antonio Magini-Coletti as Marcello); The Teatro Comunale di Bologna (4 November 1896, with Amelia Sedelmayer as Musetta and Umberto Beduschi as Rodolfo); The Teatro Costanzi (17 November 1896, with Maria Stuarda Savelli as Mimì, Enrico Giannini-Grifoni as Rodolfo, and Maurizio Bensaude as Marcello); La Scala (15 March 1897, with Angelica Pandolfini as Mimì, Camilla Pasini as Musetta, Fernando De Lucia as Rodolfo, and Edoardo Camera as Marcello); La Fenice (26 December 1897, with Emilia Merolla as Mimì, Maria Martelli as Musetta, Giovanni Apostolu and Franco Mannucci as Rodolfo, and Ferruccio Corradetti as Marcello); Teatro Regio di Parma (29 January 1898, with Solomiya Krushelnytska as Mimì, Lina Cassandro as Musetta, Pietro Ferrari as Rodolfo, and Pietro Giacomello as Marcello); Paris Opera (13 June 1898); and the Teatro Donizetti di Bergamo (21 August 1898, with Emilia Corsi as Mimì, Annita Barone as Musetta, Giovanni Apostolu as Rodolfo, and Giovanni Roussel as Marcello).

The first performance of La bohème outside Italy was at the Teatro de la Ópera in Buenos Aires, Argentina, on 16 June 1896. The protagonists were Hariclea Darclée and Emilio De Marchi, conducted by Edoardo Mascheroni.

The opera was performed in Alexandria, Lisbon, and Moscow in early 1897. The United Kingdom premiere took place at the Theatre Royal in Manchester, on 22 April 1897, in a presentation by the Carl Rosa Opera Company supervised by Puccini. This performance was given in English and starred Alice Esty as Mimì, Bessie McDonald as Musetta, Robert Cunningham as Rodolfo, and William Paull as Marcello. On 2 October 1897 the same company gave the opera's first staging at the Royal Opera House in London and on 14 October 1897 in Los Angeles for the opera's United States premiere. The opera reached New York City on 16 May 1898 when it was performed at Wallack's Theatre with Giuseppe Agostini as Rodolfo. The first production of the opera actually produced by the Royal Opera House itself premiered on 1 July 1899 with Nellie Melba as Mimì, Zélie de Lussan as Musetta, Fernando De Lucia as Rodolfo, and Mario Ancona as Marcello.

La bohème premiered in Germany at the Kroll Opera House in Berlin on 22 June 1897. The French premiere of the opera was presented by the Opéra-Comique on 13 June 1898 at the Théâtre des Nations. The production used a French translation by Paul Ferrier and starred Julia Guiraudon as Mimì, Jeanne Tiphaine as Musetta, Adolphe Maréchal as Rodolfo, and Lucien Fugère as Marcello. The Czech premiere of the opera was presented by the National Theatre on 27 February 1898.

=== 20th and 21st centuries ===
La bohème continued to gain international popularity throughout the early 20th century and the Opéra-Comique alone had already presented the opera one hundred times by 1903. The Belgian premiere took place at La Monnaie on 25 October 1900 using Ferrier's French translation with Marie Thiérry as Mimì, Léon David as Rodolfo, Eugène-Charles Badiali as Marcello, sets by Pierre Devis, Armand Lynen, and Albert Dubosq, and Philippe Flon conducting. The Metropolitan Opera staged the work for the first time on 26 December 1900 with Nellie Melba as Mimì, Annita Occhiolini-Rizzini as Musetta, Albert Saléza as Rodolfo, Giuseppe Campanari as Marcello, and Luigi Mancinelli conducting. La bohème was the last opera performed at New York's Metropolitan Opera's original 1883 building on 16 April 1966, conducted by George Schick.

The opera was first performed in Brazil at the Theatro da Paz in Belém on 21 April 1900 with the Brazilian soprano Tilde Maragliano as Mimì, Maria Cavallini as Musetta, Giuseppe Agostini as Rodolfo and Alessandro Modesti as Marcello. The conductor was Giorgio Polacco.

The following year La bohème was presented at the Teatro Amazonas in Manaus, Brazil, on 2 July 1901 with Elvira Miotti as Mimì, Mabel Nelma as Musetta, Michele Sigaldi as Rodolfo, and Enrico De Franceschi as Marcello. Other premieres soon followed:

- Melbourne: 13 July 1901 (Her Majesty's Theatre; first performance in Australia)
- Monaco: 1 February 1902, Opéra de Monte-Carlo in Monte Carlo with Nellie Melba as Mimì, Enrico Caruso as Rodolfo, Alexis Boyer as Marcello, and Léon Jehin conducting.
- Prato: 25 December 1902, Regio Teatro Metastasio with Ulderica Persichini as Mimì, Norma Sella as Musetta, Ariodante Quarti as Rodolfo, and Amleto Pollastri as Marcello.
- Catania: 9 July 1903, Politeama Pacini with Isabella Costa Orbellini as Mimì, Lina Gismondi as Musetta, Elvino Ventura as Rodolfo, and Alfredo Costa as Marcello.
- Austria: 25 November 1903, Vienna State Opera in Vienna with Selma Kurz as Mimì, Marie Gutheil-Schoder as Musetta, Fritz Schrödter as Rodolfo, Gerhard Stehmann as Marcello, and Gustav Mahler conducting.
- Sweden: 19 May 1905, Royal Dramatic Theatre in Stockholm, presented by the Royal Swedish Opera with Maria Labia as Mimì.

Puccini died in Brussels on 29 November 1924, and the news of his death reached Rome during a performance of La bohème. The opera was immediately stopped, and the orchestra played Chopin's Funeral March for the stunned audience.

The first production of La bohème at the Salzburg Festival did not occur until as late as July 2012. However, that festival has not shown much interest in the operas of Puccini, only ever having one production each of Tosca and Turandot in its entire history.

=== Critical reception ===
Despite the opera's popularity with audiences, Puccini has been the target of condescension by some music critics who find his music insufficiently sophisticated or difficult. The composer Benjamin Britten wrote in 1951, "[A]fter four or five performances I never wanted to hear Bohème again. In spite of its neatness, I became sickened by the cheapness and emptiness of the music."

== Roles ==
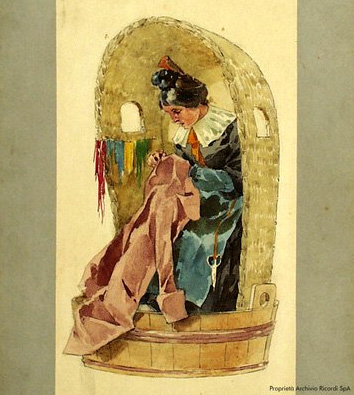
Act 2 costume design for "la rappezzatrice" (the clothes mender) for the world premiere performance

Roles, voice types, premiere cast
Role	Voice type	Premiere cast, 1 February 1896 Conductor: Arturo Toscanini
Rodolfo, a poet	tenor	Evan Gorga
Mimì, a seamstress	soprano	Cesira Ferrani
Marcello, a painter	baritone	Tieste Wilmant
Musetta, a singer	soprano	Camilla Pasini
Schaunard, a musician	baritone	Antonio Pini-Corsi
Colline, a philosopher	bass	Michele Mazzara
Benoît, their landlord	bass	Alessandro Polonini
Alcindoro, a state councillor	bass	Alessandro Polonini
Parpignol, a toy vendor	tenor	Dante Zucchi
A customs Sergeant	bass	Felice Foglia
Students, working girls, townsfolk, shopkeepers, street-vendors, soldiers, waiters, children

== Synopsis ==
Place: Paris
Time: Around 1830.

=== Act 1 ===
Opening, "Questo mar rosso"
Afro Poli (Marcello),
Beniamino Gigli (Rodolfo),
Duilio Baronti (Colline) – 1938

In the four bohemians' garret (Christmas Eve)

Marcello is painting while Rodolfo gazes out of the window. They complain of the cold. In order to keep warm, they burn the manuscript of Rodolfo's drama. Colline, the philosopher, enters shivering and disgruntled at not having been able to pawn some books. Schaunard, the musician of the group, arrives with food, wine and cigars. He explains the source of his riches: a job with an eccentric English gentleman, who hired him to play his violin to a parrot until it died. The others hardly listen to his tale as they set up the table to eat and drink. Schaunard interrupts, telling them that they must save the food for the days ahead: tonight they will all celebrate his good fortune by dining at Cafe Momus, and he will pay.

The friends are interrupted by Benoît, the landlord, who arrives to collect the rent. They flatter him and ply him with wine. In his drunkenness, he begins to boast of his amorous adventures, but when he also reveals that he is married, they thrust him from the room—without the rent payment—in comic moral indignation. The rent money is divided for their evening out at Cafe Momus. This was a cafe in Rue des Prêtres St Germain l’Auxerrois.

"Che gelida manina"
Beniamino Gigli (1931)

"Sì, mi chiamano Mimì"
Claudia Muzio (1911)

"O soave fanciulla"
Enrico Caruso, Nellie Melba (1907)

Marcello, Schaunard and Colline go out, but Rodolfo remains alone for a moment in order to finish an article he is writing, promising to join his friends soon. There is a knock at the door. It is a girl who lives in another room in the building. Her candle has blown out, and she has no matches; she asks Rodolfo to light it. She is briefly overcome with faintness, and Rodolfo helps her to a chair and offers her a glass of wine. She thanks him. After a few minutes, she says that she is better and must go. But as she turns to leave, she realizes that she has lost her key.

Her candle goes out in the draught and Rodolfo's candle goes out too; the pair stumble in the dark. Rodolfo, eager to spend time with the girl, to whom he is already attracted, finds the key and pockets it, feigning innocence. He takes her cold hand (Che gelida manina—"What a cold little hand") and tells her of his life as a poet, then asks her to tell him more about her life. The girl says her name is Mimì (Sì, mi chiamano Mimì—"Yes, they call me Mimì"), and describes her simple life as an embroiderer. Impatiently, the waiting friends call Rodolfo. He answers and turns to see Mimì bathed in moonlight (duet, Rodolfo and Mimì: O soave fanciulla—"Oh lovely girl"). They realize that they have fallen in love. Rodolfo suggests remaining at home with Mimì, but she decides to accompany him to the Cafe Momus. As they leave, they sing of their newfound love.

=== Act 2 ===
Cafe Momus (same evening)

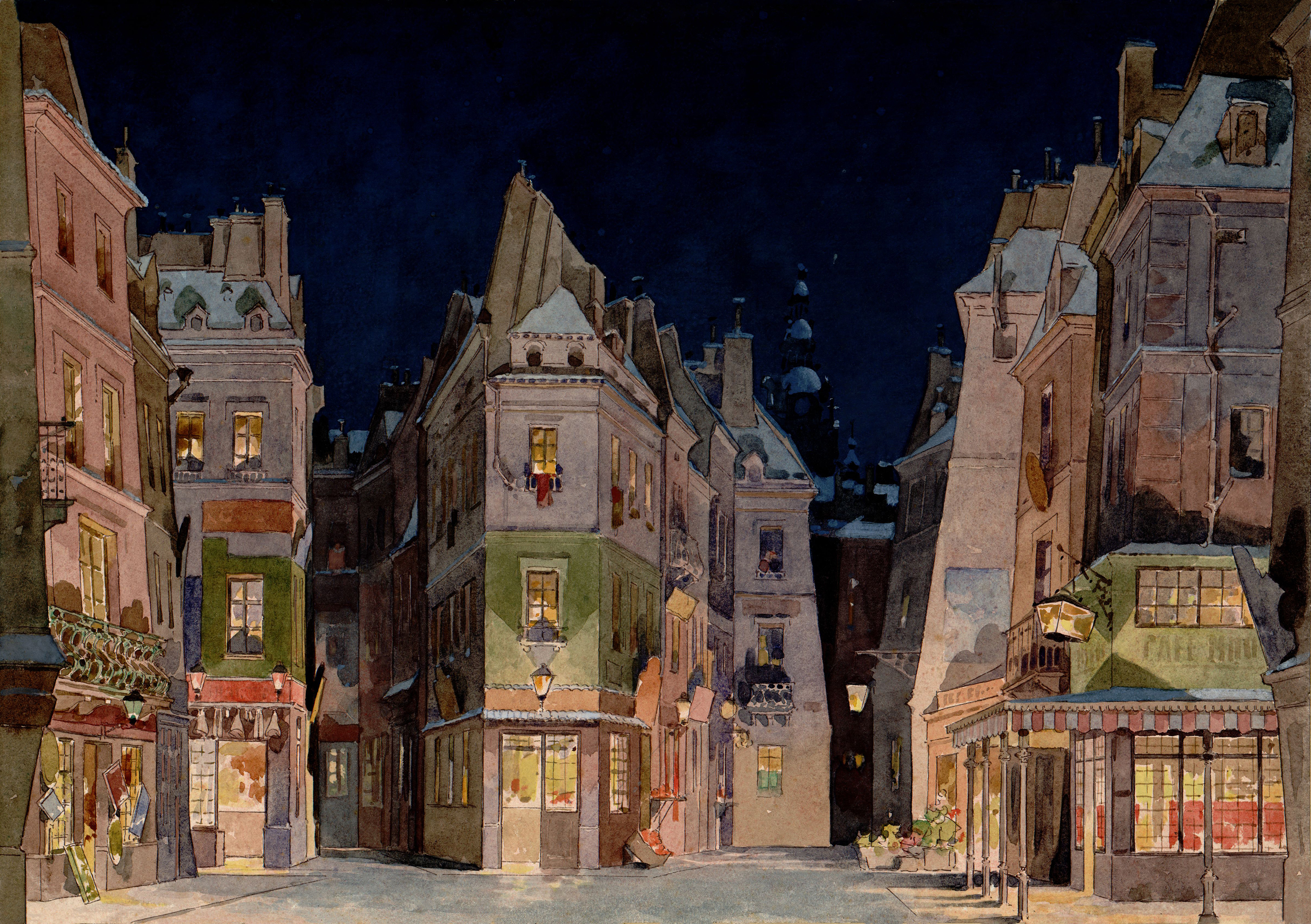
Set design by Adolfo Hohenstein for act 2 in the premiere

A great crowd, including children, has gathered with street sellers announcing their wares (chorus: Aranci, datteri! Caldi i marroni!—"Oranges, dates! Hot chestnuts!"). The friends arrive; Rodolfo buys Mimì a bonnet from a vendor, while Colline buys a coat and Schaunard a horn. Parisians gossip with friends and bargain with the vendors; the children of the streets clamor to see the wares of Parpignol, the toy seller. The friends enter the Cafe Momus.

As the men and Mimì dine at the cafe, Musetta, Marcello's former sweetheart, arrives with her rich (and elderly) government minister admirer, Alcindoro, whom she is tormenting. It is clear she is tired of him. To the delight of the Parisians and the embarrassment of her patron, she sings a risqué song (Musetta's waltz: Quando m'en vo'—"When I go along"), hoping to reclaim Marcello's attention. The ploy works; at the same time, Mimì recognizes that Musetta truly loves Marcello. To be rid of Alcindoro for a bit, Musetta pretends to be suffering from a tight shoe and sends him to the shoemaker to get her shoe mended. Alcindoro leaves, and Musetta and Marcello fall rapturously into each other's arms.

The friends are presented with their bill. However, Schaunard's purse has gone missing and no one else has enough money to pay. The sly Musetta has the entire bill charged to Alcindoro. The sound of a military band is heard, and the friends leave. Alcindoro returns with the repaired shoe seeking Musetta. The waiter hands him the bill and, dumbfounded, Alcindoro sinks into a chair.

=== Act 3 ===
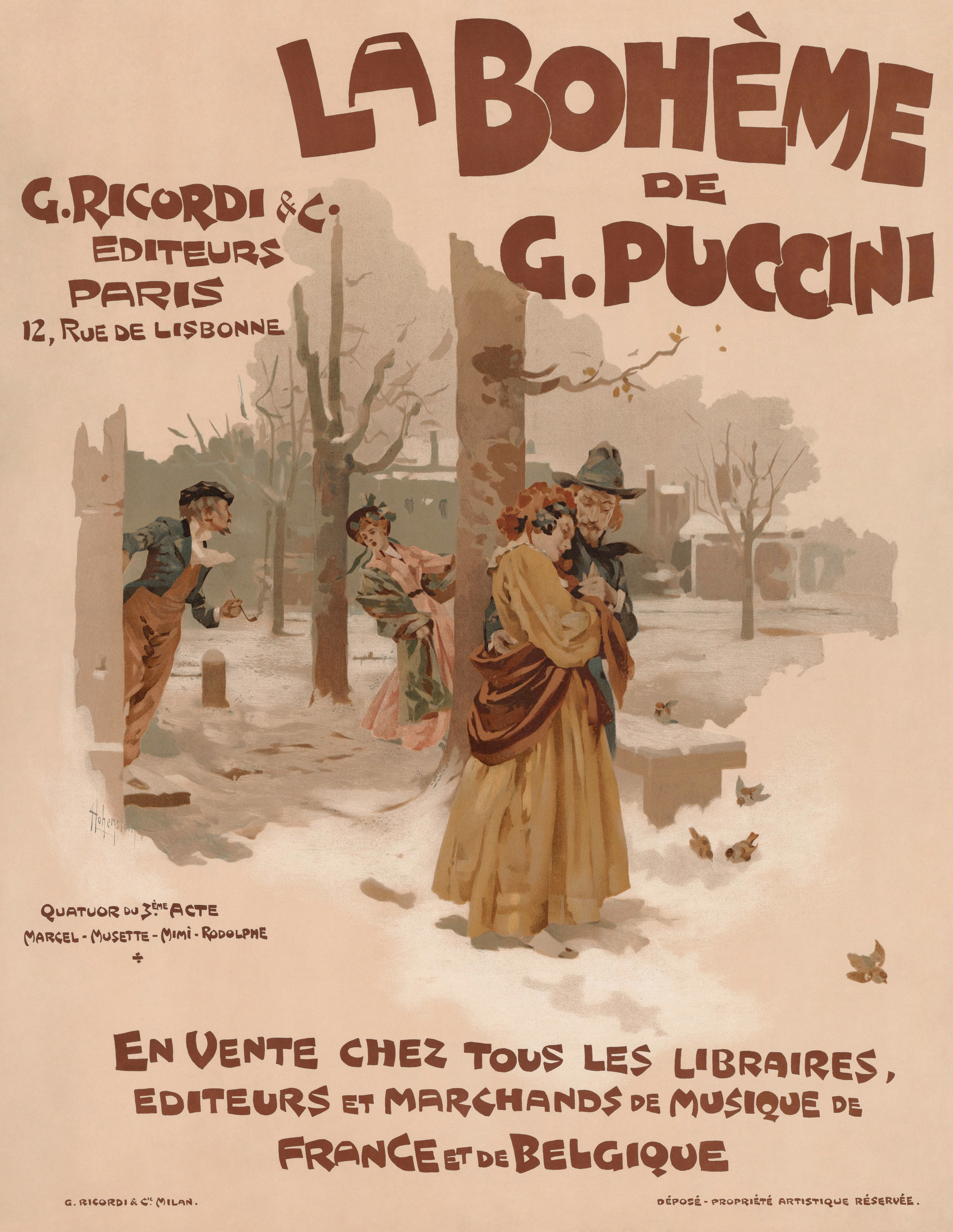
Advertisement for the music score, showing the quartet that ends act 3

At the toll gate at the Barrière d'Enfer (late February)

Peddlers pass through the barriers and enter the city. Mimì appears, coughing violently. She tries to find Marcello, who is currently living in a little tavern where he paints signs for the innkeeper. She tells him of her hard life with Rodolfo, who abandoned her the night before, and of Rodolfo's terrible jealousy (O buon Marcello, aiuto!—"Oh, good Marcello, help me!"). Marcello tells her that Rodolfo is asleep inside, and expresses concern about Mimì's cough. Rodolfo wakes up and comes out looking for Marcello. Mimì hides and overhears Rodolfo first telling Marcello that he left Mimì because of her coquettishness, but finally confessing that his jealousy is a sham: he fears she is slowly being consumed by a deadly illness (most likely tuberculosis, known by the catchall name "consumption" in the nineteenth century). Rodolfo, in his poverty, can do little to help Mimì and hopes that his pretended unkindness will inspire her to seek another, wealthier suitor (Marcello, finalmente—"Marcello, finally").

Addio di Mimì ("Donde lieta usci")
Nellie Melba, 1907 (3:03)

Out of kindness towards Mimì, Marcello tries to silence him, but she has already heard all. Her weeping and coughing reveal her presence, and Rodolfo hurries to her. Musetta's laughter is heard and Marcello goes to find out what has happened. Mimì tells Rodolfo that she is leaving him, and asks that they separate amicably (Mimì: Donde lieta uscì—"From here she happily left"); but their love for one another is too strong for the pair to part. As a compromise, they agree to remain together until the spring, when the world is coming to life again and no one feels truly alone. Meanwhile, Marcello has found Musetta, and the couple quarrel fiercely about Musetta's flirtatiousness (quartet: Mimì, Rodolfo, Musetta, Marcello: Addio dolce svegliare alla mattina!—"Goodbye, sweet awakening in the morning!").

=== Act 4 ===
Back in the garret (some months later)

"O Mimì, tu più non torni"
Enrico Caruso, Antonio Scotti (1907)

"Vecchia zimarra"
Feodor Chaliapin

"Dorme? Riposa." (finale)

Marcello and Rodolfo are trying to work, though they are primarily talking about their girlfriends, who have left them and found wealthy lovers. Rodolfo has seen Musetta in a fine carriage and Marcello has seen Mimì dressed like a queen. The men both express their nostalgia (duet: O Mimì, tu più non torni—"O Mimì, will you not return?"). Schaunard and Colline arrive with a very frugal dinner and all parody eating a plentiful banquet, dance together and sing, before Schaunard and Colline engage in a mock duel.

Musetta suddenly appears; Mimì, who took up with a wealthy viscount after leaving Rodolfo in the spring, has left her patron. Musetta found her that day in the street, severely weakened by her illness, and Mimì begged Musetta to bring her to Rodolfo. Mimì, haggard and pale, is assisted onto a bed. Briefly, she feels as though she is recovering. Musetta and Marcello leave to sell Musetta's earrings in order to buy medicine, and Colline leaves to pawn his overcoat (Vecchia zimarra—"Old coat"). Schaunard leaves with Colline to give Mimì and Rodolfo some time together. Mimì tells Rodolfo that her love for him is her whole life (aria/duet, Mimì and Rodolfo: Sono andati?—"Have they gone?").

To Mimì's delight, Rodolfo presents her with the pink bonnet he bought her, which he has kept as a souvenir of their love. They remember past happiness and their first meeting—the candles, the lost key (Mimì playfully confesses that she had figured out that Rodolfo had pocketed it). Mimì is overwhelmed by a seizure of coughing. The others return, with a gift of a muff to warm Mimì's hands and a cordial to soothe her cough. Mimì gently thanks Rodolfo for the muff, which she believes is a present from him, reassures him that she is better, and falls asleep. Musetta prays. Schaunard discovers that Mimì has died. Rodolfo rushes to the bed, calling Mimì's name in anguish. He sobs helplessly as the curtain falls.

== Instrumentation ==
La bohème is scored for:

- woodwinds: piccolo, 2 flutes, 2 oboes, cor anglais, 2 clarinets (A, B-flat), bass clarinet (A, B-flat), 2 bassoons
- brass: 4 horns in F, 3 trumpets in F, 3 trombones, bass trombone
- percussion: timpani, snare drum, triangle, cymbals, bass drum, xylophone, glockenspiel, chimes
- strings: harp, violins (I and II), viola, cello, double bass
- off-stage (end of act 2): 4 piccolos, 6 trumpets, 6 snare drums (occasionally on-stage)

== Recording history ==
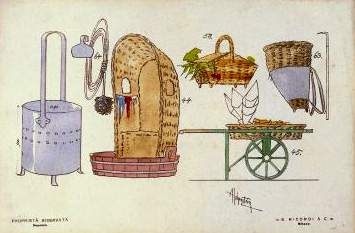
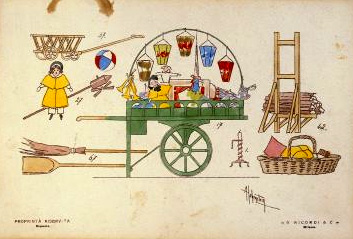
Prop designs for act 2 of La bohème for the world premiere performance

The discography of La bohème is a long one with many distinguished recordings, including the 1972 Decca recording conducted by Herbert von Karajan with Luciano Pavarotti as Rodolfo and Mirella Freni as Mimì (made before Pavarotti became an international superstar of opera), and the 1973 RCA Victor recording conducted by Sir Georg Solti with Montserrat Caballé as Mimì and Plácido Domingo as Rodolfo which won the 1974 Grammy Award for Best Opera Recording. The 1959 recording conducted by Tullio Serafin with Renata Tebaldi as Mimì and Carlo Bergonzi as Rodolfo was included in the soundtrack of the 1987 movie Moonstruck.

The earliest commercially released full-length recording was probably that recorded in February 1917 and released on His Master Voice's Italian label La Voce del Padrone. Carlo Sabajno conducted the La Scala Orchestra and Chorus with Gemma Bosini and Reno Andreini as Mimì and Rodolfo. One of the most recent is the 2008 Deutsche Grammophon release conducted by Bertrand de Billy with Anna Netrebko and Rolando Villazón as Mimì and Rodolfo.

There are several recordings with conductors closely associated with Puccini. In the 1946 RCA Victor recording, Arturo Toscanini, who conducted the world premiere of the opera, conducts the NBC Symphony Orchestra with Jan Peerce as Rodolfo and Licia Albanese as Mimì. It is the only recording of a Puccini opera by its original conductor. Thomas Beecham, who worked closely with Puccini when preparing a 1920 production of La bohème in London, conducted a performance of the opera in English released by Columbia Records in 1936 with Lisa Perli as Mimì and Heddle Nash as Rodolfo. Beecham also conducts on the 1956 RCA Victor recording with Victoria de los Ángeles and Jussi Björling as Mimì and Rodolfo.

Although the vast majority of recordings are in the original Italian, the opera has been recorded in several other languages. These include: a recording in French conducted by Erasmo Ghiglia with Renée Doria and Alain Vanzo as Mimì and Rodolfo (1960); a recording in German with Richard Kraus conducting the Deutsche Oper Berlin Orchestra and Chorus with Trude Eipperle and Fritz Wunderlich as Mimì and Rodolfo (1956); and the 1998 release on the Chandos Opera in English label with David Parry conducting the Philharmonia Orchestra and Cynthia Haymon and Dennis O'Neill as Mimì and Rodolfo.

Enrico Caruso, who was closely associated with the role of Rodolfo, recorded the famous aria "Che gelida manina" in 1906. This aria has been recorded by nearly 500 tenors in at least seven different languages between 1900 and 1980. In 1981 the A.N.N.A. Record Company released a six LP set with 101 different tenors singing the aria.

== The missing act ==
In 1957 Illica's widow died and his papers were given to the Parma Museum. Among them was the full libretto to La bohème. It was then discovered that the librettists had prepared an act which Puccini decided not to use in his composition. It is noteworthy for explaining Rodolfo's jealous remarks to Marcello in act 3.

The "missing act" is located in the timeline between the Café Momus scene and act 3 and describes an open-air party at Musetta's dwelling. Her protector has refused to pay further rent out of jealous feelings, and Musetta's furniture is moved into the courtyard to be auctioned off the following morning. The four Bohemians find in this an excuse for a party and arrange for wine and an orchestra. Musetta gives Mimì a beautiful gown to wear and introduces her to a Viscount. The pair dances a quadrille in the courtyard, which moves Rodolfo to jealousy. This explains his act 3 reference to the "moscardino di Viscontino" (young fop of a Viscount). As dawn approaches, furniture dealers gradually remove pieces for the morning auction.

Ruggero Leoncavallo composed an opera based the same source material, also titled La bohème; this episode is included in Leoncavallo's treatment which premiered in 1897.

== Derivative works ==
In 1959 "Musetta's Waltz" was adapted by songwriter Bobby Worth for the pop song "Don't You Know?", a hit for Della Reese. Earlier, it was used for another song, "One Night of Love".

In 1969 in Paris, American free-jazz pianist Dave Burrell recorded his La Vie de Bohème with a seven-piece group of European and American musicians. The music on the double-LP is improvised and experimental, but the listener can still discern Puccini's themes, as well as the narrative arc of the complete opera.

The opera was adapted into a 1983 short story by the novelist V. S. Pritchett for publication by the Metropolitan Opera Association.

=== Modernizations ===
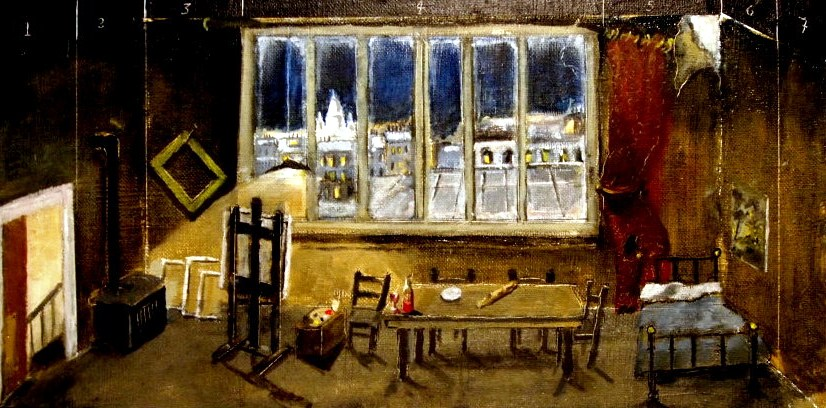
Stage design for act 1 of La bohème, Reginald Gray, 2010

Baz Luhrmann produced the opera for Opera Australia in 1990 with modernized supertitle translations, and a budget of only A$60,000 (A$130,545.17 in 2022). A DVD was issued of the stage show. According to Luhrmann, this version was set in 1957 (rather than the original period of 1830) because "...[they] discovered that 1957 was a very, very accurate match for the social and economic realities of Paris in the 1840s." In 2002, Luhrmann restaged his version on Broadway. The production won two awards at the 57th Tony Awards out of six nominations: Catherine Martin for Best Scenic Design and Nigel Levings for Best Lighting Design as well as a special award, the Tony Honors for Excellence in Theatre. Joe Jonas appeared in this production in the children's chorus. To play eight times a week for 228 performances, three casts of Mimìs and Rodolfos (Alfred Boe, Jesús García, David Miller), and two Musettas (Jessica Comeau, Chloë Wright) and Marcellos (Eugene Brancoveanu, Ben Davis), were used in rotation. La bohème was then a key source for the plot of Luhrmann's 2001 jukebox musical film Moulin Rouge!.

The musical Rent by Jonathan Larson, which won both the Pulitzer Prize for Drama and the 1996 Tony Award for Best Musical, is based on La bohème. The story is set amongst artists living in New York City at the end of the 1980s and beginning of the 1990s. Here the lovers, Roger and Mimi, are faced with AIDS rather than tuberculosis, and progress through the action with songs such as "Light My Candle", many of which have direct references to La bohème. Many of the character names are retained or are similar: the painter Marcello is the videographer Mark, Rodolfo is Roger, Colline is Collins, the character Angel is given the surname "Schunard" to refer to Schaunard, Benoit is Benny, Musetta is Maureen. At one point in the play, Roger's roommate and best friend Mark makes a wry reference to "Musetta's Waltz", which is a recurring theme throughout the first act and is played at the end of the second act, while Musetta's modern counterpart in the show, Maureen, has a duet with her partner, Joanne, entitled "Take Me or Leave Me" in which lyrics derived from Musetta's Waltz are used.

A TV movie was released in 1965 directed by Wilhelm Semmelroth and designed by Franco Zeffirelli, based on the latter's previously directed version for stage. It starred Gianni Raimondi in the role of Rodolfo and Mirella Freni as Mimì. The soundtrack, however, was pre-recorded and lip-synced, and conducted by Herbert von Karajan.

Robin Norton-Hale directed a new production at the Cock Tavern Theatre, Kilburn, for OperaUpClose in December 2009. For act 2 the entire audience and cast moved downstairs to the pub itself, with the pub's patrons serving as extras in the Cafe Momus scene. In 2010 the production was transferred to the West End's Soho Theatre and won a Laurence Olivier Award.

A 2019 production by Canada's Against the Grain Theatre featured a translated English libretto, and transposed the story to a contemporary Canadian urban setting. This production toured several Canadian cities before its production at Toronto's Tranzac Club was livestreamed by CBC Gem on 13 October. The CBC broadcast received two Canadian Screen Award nominations at the 9th Canadian Screen Awards in 2021, for Best Performing Arts Program and Best Direction in a TV Movie.

The plot of the 2016 Korean musical Maybe Happy Ending begins with Claire knocking on Oliver's door asking him to charge her battery, which has been taken as a parallel to how La bohème's Mimì and Rodolfo meet. As in La bohème, it is implied from the outset that the heroine is doomed (though in Maybe Happy Ending her male counterpart is as well), and at one point this knowledge leads the two protagonists – like Mimì and Rodolfo – to agree to separate.

== Awards and nominations ==
=== 2002 Broadway revival ===
Year	Award	Category	Nominee	Result
2003	Tony Award	Best Revival of a Musical		Nominated
2003	Tony Award	Best Scenic Design	Catherine Martin	Won
2003	Tony Award	Best Costume Design	Angus Strathie and Catherine Martin	Won
2003	Tony Award	Best Lighting Design	Nigel Levings	Won
2003	Tony Award	Best Direction of a Musical	Baz Luhrmann	Nominated
2003	Tony Award	Best Orchestrations	Nicholas Kitsopoulos	Nominated
2003	Tony Award	Tony Honors for Excellence in Theatre		Won
2003	Drama Desk Award	Outstanding Revival of a Musical		Nominated
2003	Drama Desk Award	Outstanding Actress in a Musical	Wei Huang	Nominated
2003	Drama Desk Award	Outstanding Direction of a Musical	Baz Luhrmann	Nominated
2003	Drama Desk Award	Outstanding Scenic Design of a Musical	Catherine Martin	Won
2003	Drama Desk Award	Outstanding Costume Design	Catherine Martin and Angus Strathie	Nominated
2003	Drama Desk Award	Outstanding Lighting Design	Nigel Levings	Won
2003	Drama Desk Award	Outstanding Sound Design	Acme Sound Partners	Won

=== 2010 West End production ===
Year	Award	Category	Nominee	Result
2011	Laurence Olivier Award	Best New Opera Production		Won

== Sources ==
- Budden, Julian (2002). Puccini: His Life and Works. Oxford University Press. ISBN 978-0-19-816468-5.
- Groos, Arthur; Parker, Roger, eds. (1986). "La bohème". Cambridge Opera Handbooks. Cambridge University Press. ISBN 0-521-26489-8.
- Irvin, Eric (1985). Dictionary of the Australian Theatre 1788–1914. Hale & Iremonger. ISBN 978-0-86806-127-6.
- Greenfield, Edward; Layton, Robert (2009). March, Ivan; Czajkowski, Paul (eds.). The Penguin Guide to Recorded Classical Music 2010. Penguin. ISBN 978-0-14-104162-9.
- Melitz, Leo [in German] (1913). The Opera Goer's Complete Guide. Translated by Richard Salinger. New York: Dodd, Mead and Company – via Internet Archive.
- Pritchett, V. S. (1983). La bohème. London: Michael Joseph. ISBN 0-7181-2303-4.
