= Henri Murger =

French novelist and poet (1822–1861)

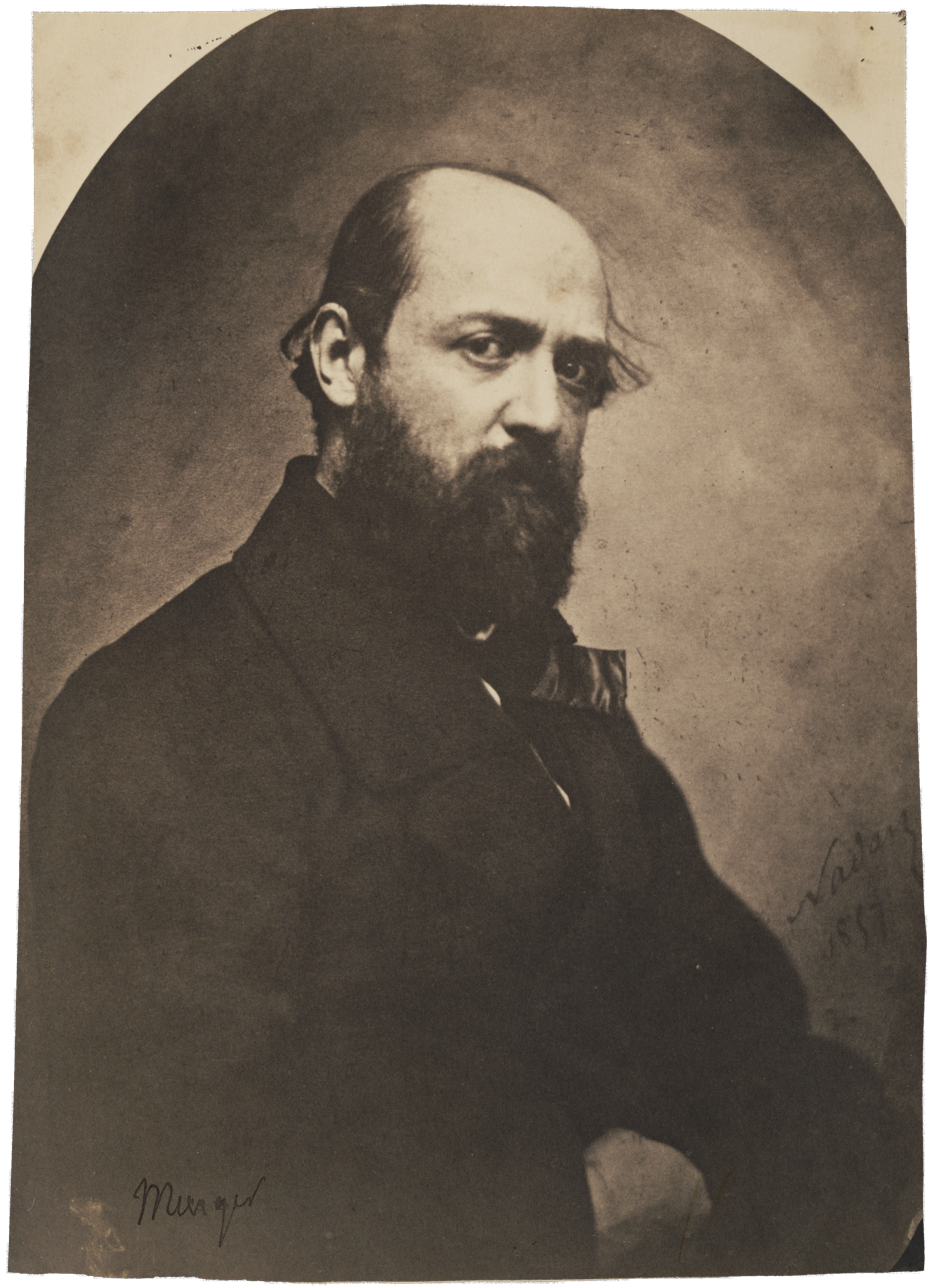
Henri Murger in 1857

Louis-Henri Murger (27 March 1822 – 28 January 1861), also known as Henri Murger and Henry Murger, was a French novelist and poet.

He is chiefly distinguished as the author of the 1847-1849 book Scènes de la vie de bohème (Scenes of Bohemian Life), which is based on his own experiences as a desperately poor writer living in a Parisian garret (the top floor of buildings, where artists often lived) and as a member of a loose club of friends who called themselves "the water drinkers" (because they were too poor to afford wine). In his writing he combines instinct with pathos, humour, and sadness. The book is the basis for the 1896 opera La bohème by Puccini, Leoncavallo's opera of the same name, and, at greater removes, Amadeu Vives' zarzuela Bohemios, Kálmán's 1930 operetta Das Veilchen vom Montmartre, and the 1996 Broadway musical Rent. He wrote lyrics as well as novels and stories, the chief being La Chanson de Musette – "a tear", says Gautier, "which has become a pearl of poetry".

== Biography ==
Murger was born and died in Paris. He was the son of a Savoyard immigrant who worked as a tailor and janitor for an apartment building in the Rue Saint Georges. He had a scanty and fragmented education. After leaving school at 15 he worked in a variety of menial jobs before securing one in a lawyer's office. While there he also wrote poetry which came to the attention of the French writer Étienne de Jouy. De Jouy's connections enabled him to secure the position of secretary to Count Tolstoi, a Russian nobleman living in Paris. Murger's literary career began about 1841. His first essays were mainly literary and poetic, but under the pressure of earning a living he wrote whatever he could find a market for, turning out prose as he put it, "at the rate of eighty francs an acre". At one point he edited a fashion newspaper, Le Moniteur de la Mode, and a paper for the millinery trade, Le Castor. His position gradually improved when the French writer Champfleury, with whom he lived for a time, urged Murger to devote himself to fiction. His first big success was Scènes de la vie de bohème. In 1851 Murger published a sequel, Scènes de la vie de jeunesse. Several more works followed, but none of them brought him the same popular acclaim.

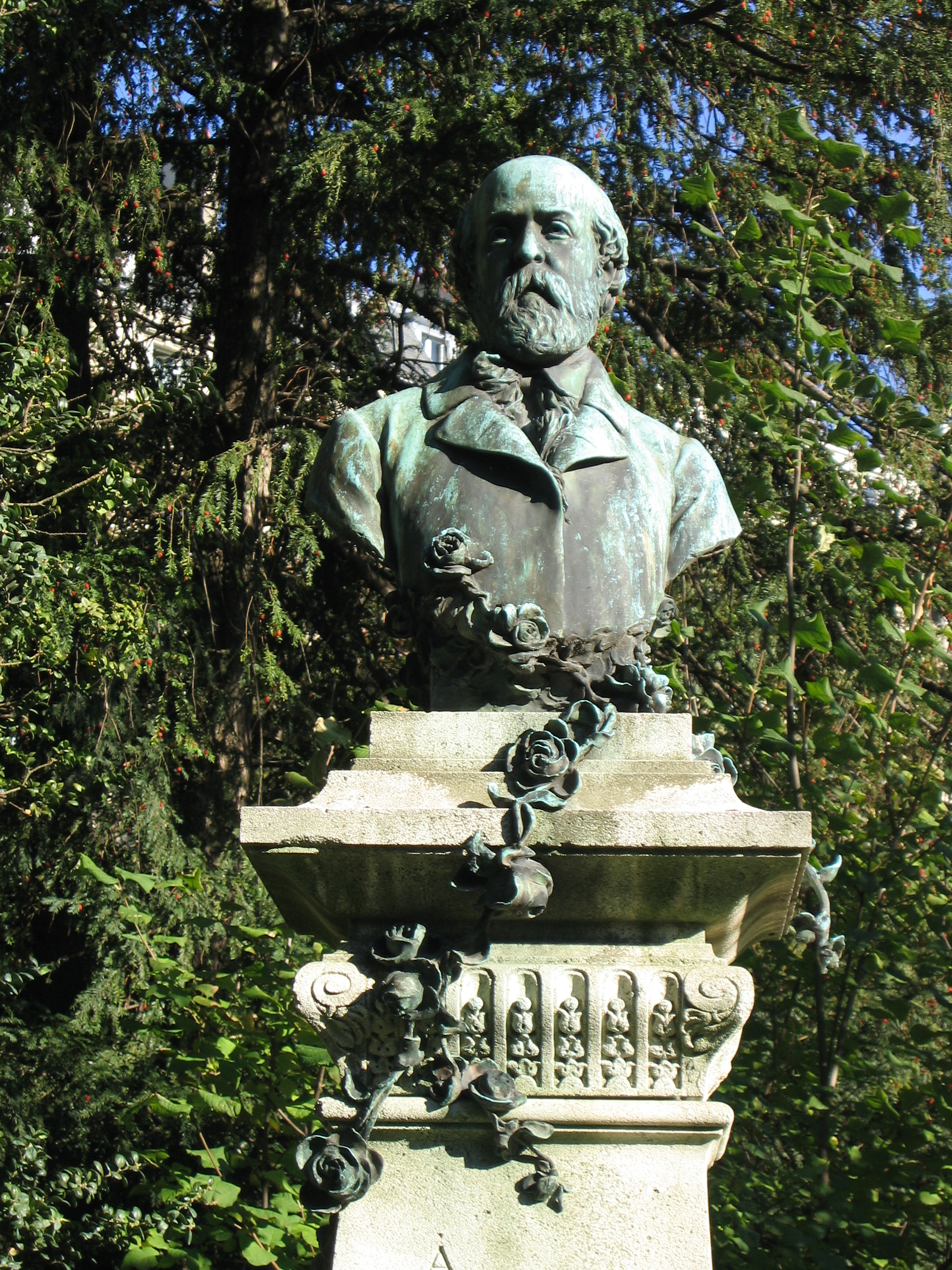
Bust of Henry Murger (the monument itself spells his name "Henry," rather than the usual French spelling of Henri) in the Jardin du Luxembourg, Paris

He lived much of the next ten years in a country house outside Paris, dogged by financial problems and recurrent ill health. In 1859 he received the Légion d'honneur but within two years he was almost penniless and dying in a Paris hospital. Napoleon III's minister Count Walewski sent 500 francs to help pay his medical expenses, but it was too late. Henri Murger died on 28 January 1861 at the age of 38. The French government paid for his funeral, which from contemporary accounts in Le Figaro was a great public occasion attended by 250 luminaries from journalism, literature, theatre, and the arts. Le Figaro also started a fund to raise money for his monument. Hundreds of people contributed and within two months it had raised over 6,500 francs.

=== Spelling of the name ===
Early in his career, in an effort to make himself appear more "elegant and noticeable", Murger signed his name as "Henry Mürger", the English-looking "y" and German-looking umlaut both being exotic in French. - though the spelling of Henry rather than Henri was also archaic French, having been standard orthography (along with such spellings as loy and roy) prior to c. 1775 and not totally supplanted by "i" until after 1790. After experimenting with other variations he eventually kept the former but dropped the latter, so that all of his best-known works were published under the name "Henry Murger".

== Works ==
- Scènes de la vie de bohème (1847–49).
- Scènes de la vie de jeunesse (1851).
- Le Pays latin (1851).
- Propos de ville et propos de théâtre (1853).
- Scènes de campagne (1854).
- Le Roman de toutes les femmes (1854).
- Ballades et Fantaisies (1854).
- Les Buveurs d'eau (1854).
- Le Dessous du panier (1855).
- Le Dernier rendez-vous (1856).
- Les Nuits d’hiver (1856).
- Les Vacances de Camille (1857).
- Le Sabot rouge (1860).
- Madame Olympe (1860).

In English translation

- The Bohemians of the Latin Quarter (1888).
- Scenes of Bohemian Life. Trans. Robert Holton. Anthem Press (2023).
- Winter Nights (1923).
- The Water Drinkers and Other Sketches of Paris in the Romantic Era. Trans. Zack Rogow. Black Widow Press (2026).
