= List of compositions by Giacomo Puccini =

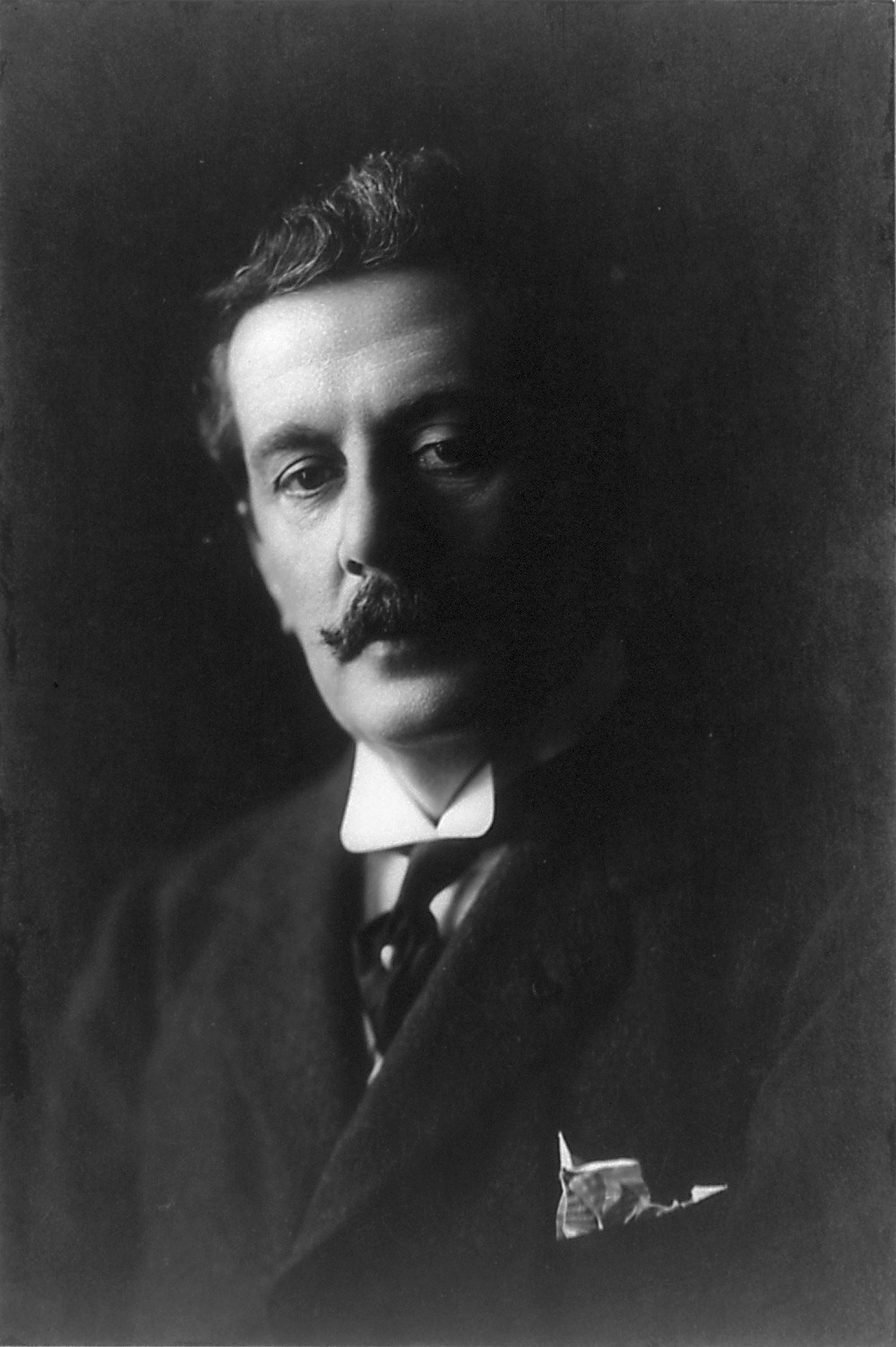
Giacomo Puccini

The Italian composer Giacomo Puccini (1858–1924) is regarded as the natural successor to the tradition of Giuseppe Verdi and is considered the greatest Italian opera proponent of his time. Best known for his 12 operas, his style quickly departed from the predominant Romantic Italian style and he emerged as the most significant representative of verismo, a radically realist approach.

== Operas ==
Operas by Giacomo Puccini
Title	Genre	Acts	Language	Librettist	Premiere	
Title	Genre	Acts	Language	Librettist	Date	Venue
Le Villi	Leggenda drammatica	1 act	Italian	Ferdinando Fontana	31 May 1884	Teatro Dal Verme
Le Villi	Leggenda drammatica	2 acts	Italian	Ferdinando Fontana	26 December 1884	Teatro Regio (Note: third version (in two acts – premiered at La Scala, 24 January 1885); fourth version (in two acts – premiered at the Teatro dal Verme, 7 November 1889))
Edgar	Dramma lirico	4 acts	Italian	Ferdinando Fontana	21 April 1889	La Scala
Edgar	Dramma lirico	4 acts	Italian	Ferdinando Fontana	5 September 1891	Teatro del Giglio
Edgar	Dramma lirico	3 acts	Italian	Ferdinando Fontana	28 January 1892	Teatro Comunale (Note: fourth version (in three acts – premiered at the Teatro Opera, 8 July 1905))
Manon Lescaut	Dramma lirico	4 acts	Italian	Luigi Illica, Giuseppe Giacosa, Marco Praga and Domenico Olivia	1 February 1893	Teatro Regio (Note: second version (in four acts – premiered at the Teatro Coccia, 21 December 1893))
La bohème	Opera	4 acts	Italian	Luigi Illica and Giuseppe Giacosa	1 February 1896	Teatro Regio
Tosca	Melodrama	3 acts	Italian	Luigi Illica and Giuseppe Giacosa	14 January 1900	Teatro Costanzi
Madama Butterfly	Tragedia giapponese	2 acts	Italian	Luigi Illica and Giuseppe Giacosa	17 February 1904	La Scala
Madama Butterfly	Tragedia giapponese	2 acts	Italian	Luigi Illica and Giuseppe Giacosa	28 May 1904	Teatro Grande
Madama Butterfly	Tragedia giapponese	2 acts	Italian	Luigi Illica and Giuseppe Giacosa	10 July 1905	Covent Garden
Madama Butterfly	Tragedia giapponese	3 acts	Italian	Luigi Illica and Giuseppe Giacosa	28 December 1906	Opéra-Comique (Note: fifth version (in three acts – premiered at the Teatro Carcano, 9 December 1920))
La fanciulla del West	Opera	3 acts	Italian	Guelfo Civinini and Carlo Zangarini	10 December 1910	Metropolitan Opera (Note: second version (in three acts – premiered at La Scala, 29 December 1912))
La rondine	Commedia lirica	3 acts	Italian	Giuseppe Adami	27 March 1917	Opéra de Monte-Carlo (Note: second version (in three acts – premiered at the Teatro Massimo, 10 April 1920); third version (in three acts – possible premier at the Teatro Verdi, 11 April 1924); orchestration of the third act completed in 1994 by Lorenzo Ferrero (premiered at the Teatro Regio, 22 March 1994))
Il trittico:				see below	14 December 1918	Metropolitan Opera
Il tabarro	Opera	1 act	Italian	Giuseppe Adami	14 December 1918	Metropolitan Opera
Suor Angelica	Opera	1 act	Italian	Giovacchino Forzano	14 December 1918	Metropolitan Opera
Gianni Schicchi	Opera	1 act	Italian	Giovacchino Forzano	14 December 1918	Metropolitan Opera
Turandot; Incomplete (compl. by Franco Alfano) (Note: An alternative completion was commissioned from Luciano Berio in 2001 and premiered in 2002.)	Dramma lirico	3 acts	Italian	Renato Simoni and Giuseppe Adami	25 April 1926	La Scala

== Other works ==
(by genre, categorized by date)

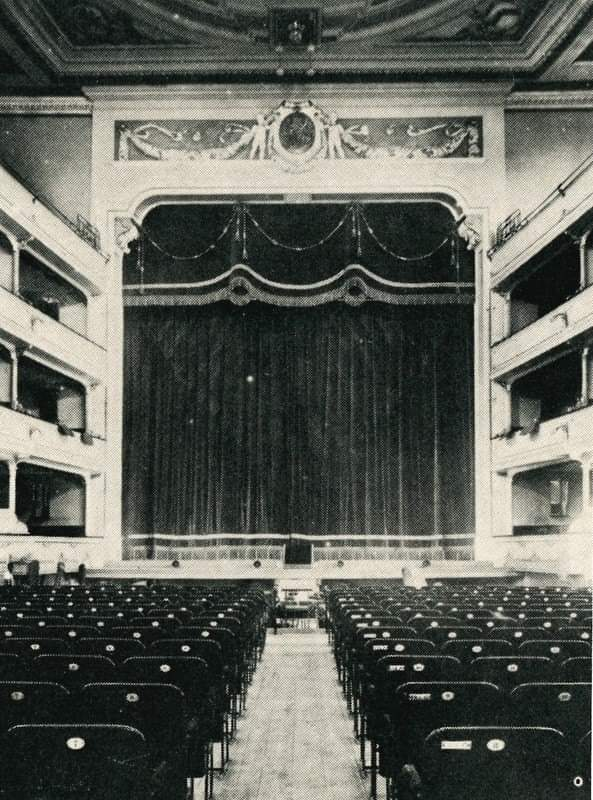
The interior performance hall of the Teatro Puccini.

=== Art songs ===
- A te (c. 1875)
- Plaudite populi (Lucca, 1877)
- Credo (Lucca, 1878)
- Vexilla Regis (1878)
- Sole e amore (1888)
- Salve del ciel Regina (c. 1882)
- Mentìa l’avviso (c. 1882)
- Storiella d’amore (1883)
- Piccolo valzer (1894)
- Avanti Urania! (1896)
- Scossa elettrica (1896)
- Inno a Diana (1897)
- E l'uccellino (1899)
- Terra e mare (1902)
- Canto d'anime (1904)
- Dios y Patria (himno escolar, text in Spanish, 3 August 1905, Buenos Aires)
- Casa mia, casa mia (1908)
- Sogno d'or (1913)
- Morire? (c. 1917) – This song was transposed by a half step (into G-flat major) and set to different text in the 1st revision of his work La rondine called "Parigi è la città dei desideri" which is sung by Ruggero in the 1st act. Besides the key and text changes, it is the exact music to the aria.
- Inno a Roma (1 June 1919, Rome)

=== Orchestral ===
- Preludio sinfonico in A Major (1876)
- Capriccio sinfonico (1883)
- Pezzi per organo e per pianoforte (1874-1878)
- Preludio Sinfonico in A major (Milan, 1882)
- Largo Adagietto in F major (c. 1881–83)

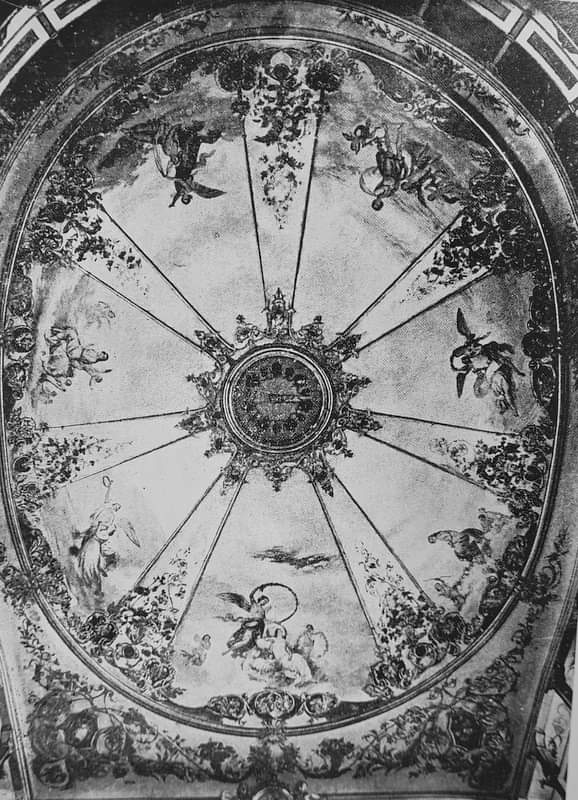
The coffered ceiling inside the Teatro Puccini in Udine, Italy.

=== Piano ===
- Foglio d’Album in Bb Major
- Pezzo per pianoforte (1916)
- Fugues (c. 1883)
- Scherzo in D (1883)
- Adagio in A major (1881)

=== Chamber ===
- Scherzo in A Minor for String Quartet (c.1880-1883)
- String Quartet in D Major (c.1880-1883)
- 3 Minuetti for String Quartet (1881)
- Crisantemi (movement for string quartet, 1890, a Threnody "Alla memoria di Amedeo di Savoia Duca d'Aosta", composed in the course of a single night in memory of his friend the duke of Aosta)

=== Choral music ===
- Requiem (27 January 1905, Milan)
- Messa a 4 voci con orchestra (Lucca, 1880) Published in 1951 as Messa di Gloria

== Sources ==
- Budden, Julian (2005). Puccini: His Life and Works. Oxford, England: Oxford University Press. ISBN 978-0-19-534625-1.
- Fairtile, Linda B. (2013). Giacomo Puccini: A Guide to Research. Oxford, England: Taylor & Francis. ISBN 978-1-135-59241-7.
- Girardi, Michele (2001). "Puccini, Giacomo". Grove Music Online. Oxford, England: Oxford University Press. doi:10.1093/gmo/9781561592630.article.6002278242. (subscription, Wikilibrary access, or UK public library membership required)
