= Crisantemi =

1890 composition for string quartet by Giacomo Puccini

- String quartet by Giacomo Puccini
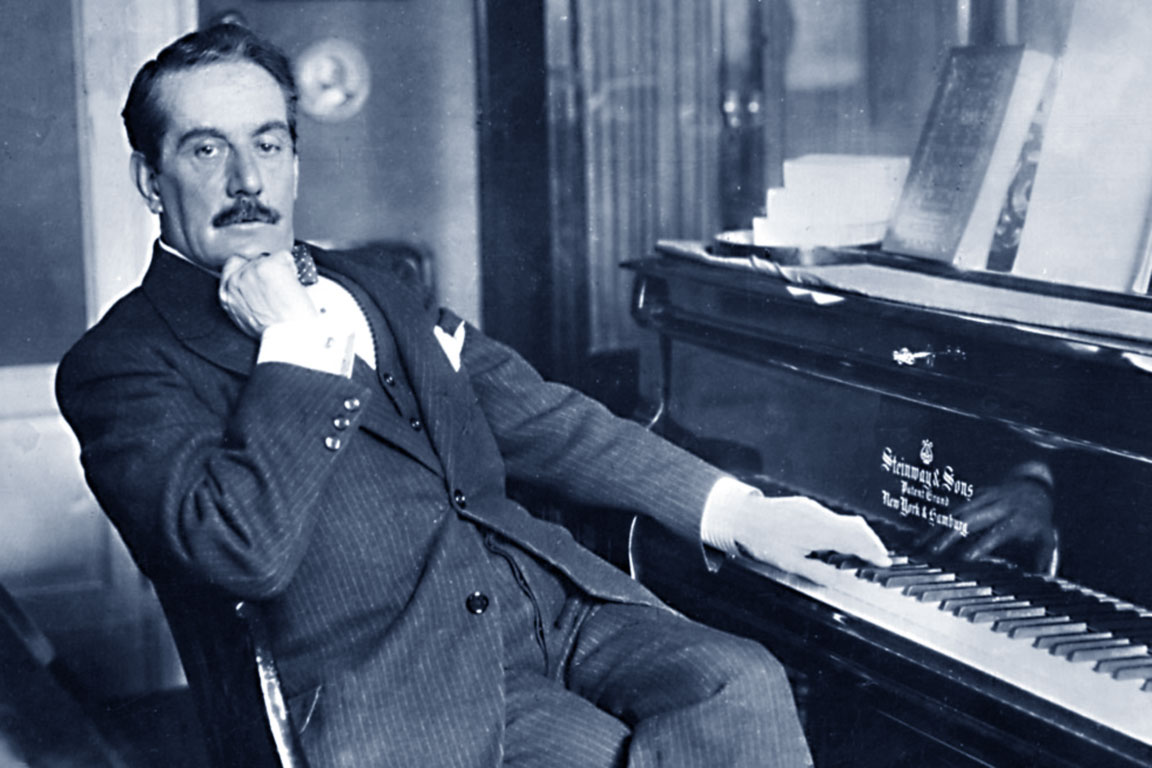
- Puccini in 1900
- English: Chrysanthemums
- Catalogue: SC 65
- Occasion: In memory of Amedeo di Savoia
- Performed: 26 January 1890

Crisantemi, (Chrysanthemums), SC 65, is a composition for string quartet written by Giacomo Puccini in 1890 as a tribute to the death of Amadeo I of Spain, a son of the Italian King, Vittorio Emanuele II.

== History ==
Puccini had already composed the operas Le Villi in 1884 and Edgar in 1890. The opera Edgar was not a success (Puccini repeatedly revised it until the last performance in Buenos Aires, in 1905, before declaring the work irredeemable). A few months after the failed debut of Edgar, Puccini started writing his masterpiece Manon Lescaut. Suddenly in 1890 at just 44 years old, Amadeo I of Spain died due to lung disease. Deeply moved by Amadeo I of Spain's death, Puccini wrote this work in a sudden burst of inspiration, just in a night. White chrysanthemums (in Italian crisantemi) are used in Italy only for funerals or on graves. Crisantemi was first played on 26 January 1890. After its successful performance, Puccini incorporated themes from Crisantemi into Manon Lescaut.

== Composition ==
Crisantemi is a single-movement composition in ternary form. This work is a haunting musical lament, rooted in the key of C-sharp minor. The piece unfolds in a single, mournful movement, characterized by two primary themes. The first theme, a slow, chromatic descent, builds intensity through contrary motion. The central section reaches a poignant climax as the violin soars over a gentle viola pattern, while the cello provides a steady, melancholic bass line. A series of intense climaxes, marked by unison playing, punctuate the work. The elegy concludes with a reprise of the opening theme.
