= Torna ai felici dì =

"Torna ai felici dì" ("Return to the happy days") is a tenor aria from act 2 of the 1884 opera, Le Villi by Giacomo Puccini. It is sung by Roberto as he mourns the loss of the days of his youth and his beloved Anna. Anna has been killed by fairies that were conjured by a witch that seduced Roberto when he was away in Mainz. However, he does not find this out until after it happens.

This scene takes place at a town in the Black Forest during spring.

== Libretto ==
Ecco la casa Dio, che orrenda notte!
Strane voci m'inseguon
Le Villi...Evvia! Son fole!
No, delle Villi me non perseguita la vendetta fatal!
Tu sol m'insegui, rimorso!
Vipera infernal!
Tu sol m'insegui, rimorso!
Vipera dal velno infernal!

Torna ai felici dì dolente il mio pensier,
Ridean del maggio i fior, fioria per me l'amor.
Or tutto si coprì di mister...
Ed io non ho nel cor che tristezza e terror,
Forse ella vive! Bussiam!
Qual brivido mi colse!
Invan di quella soglia tentai
Sul limite levar la man!
Pur d'intender parmi davero un canto lugubre!
O sommo Iddio! Del mio cammino,
O sommo Iddio, del mio destin quest'è la meta...
Fa che il perdono, fa che il perdon
La renda lieta un solo istante e poi morrò!
Pregar non posso! Ah, maledetto il dì
Che andai lontan di qui!
Maledetta sia la tua bellezza, o cortigiana vil...
Maledetta in eterno! Maledetta!
