= Messa (Puccini) =

Mass by Giacomo Puccini

- Mass by Giacomo Puccini
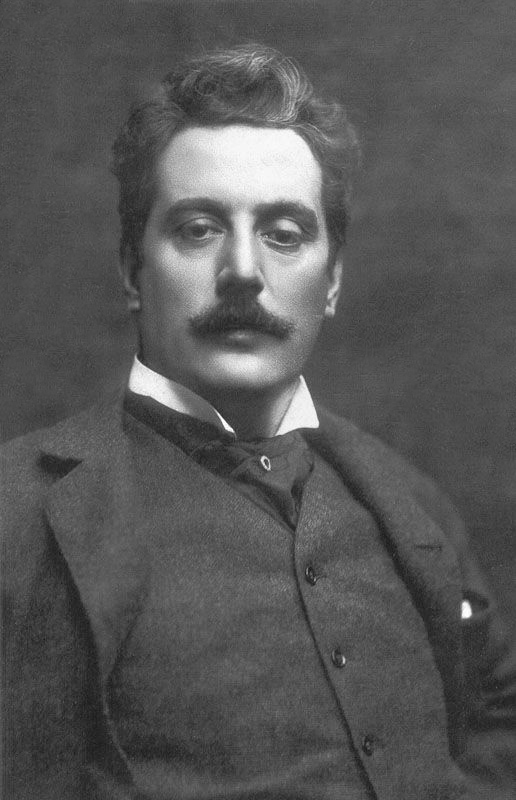
- The composer
- Other name: Messa di Gloria
- Occasion: graduation exercise
- Performed: 12 July 1880: Lucca
- Movements: six
- Scoring: tenor; baritone; SATB choir; orchestra

Giacomo Puccini's Messa a quattro voci, or Mass for 4 Voices, was written in 1880 and is a complete setting of the Ordinary (Kyrie, Gloria, Credo, Sanctus, Benedictus and Agnus Dei) scored for four-part choir (with tenor and baritone soloists) and orchestra. It was not published, however, until 1951, in New York, when it was incorrectly titled Messa di Gloria, a truncated type of Mass setting.

== History ==
Puccini composed the Mass as his graduation exercise from the Istituto Musicale Pacini. It had its first performance in Lucca on July 12, 1880. However, the Credo had already been written and performed in 1878 and was initially conceived by Puccini as a self-contained work. Puccini never published the full manuscript of the Messa, and although well received at the time, it was not performed again until 1952 (first in Chicago and then in Naples). However, he re-used some of its themes in other works, such as the Agnus Dei in his opera Manon Lescaut and the Kyrie in Edgar.

At the end of World War II, Fr. Dante Del Fiorentino purchased an old copy of the manuscript of the Messa from the Vandini family in Lucca, imagining it was the original score. However, the autograph, in the possession of the Puccini family, was given by his daughter-in-law to Ricordi, Puccini's publishing firm. The ensuing legal battle was finally resolved by dividing the rights to the work between Ricordi and Mills Music (the publishers of Fiorentino's manuscript).

== Structure ==
Movement	Timing	Title	Movement indication	Solo
Kyrie	5 min.	Kyrie eleison	Larghetto	
Gloria	20 min.	Gloria in excelsis Deo	Allegro ma non troppo	
Gloria	20 min.	Et in terra pax	Andante	
Gloria	20 min.	Laudamus te, benedicimus te	Andante	
Gloria	20 min.	Gratias agimus tibi	Andante sostenuto	tenor
Gloria	20 min.	Gloria in excelsis Deo	Tempo I	
Gloria	20 min.	Domine Deus	Andante sostenuto	
Gloria	20 min.	Qui tollis peccata mundi	Andante mosso	
Gloria	20 min.	Quoniam tu solus sanctus	Maestoso	
Gloria	20 min.	Cum Sancto Spiritu	Fugue (Allegro)	
Credo	16 min.	Credo in unum Deum	Andante	
Credo	16 min.	Et incarnatus	Moderato	tenor
Credo	16 min.	Crucifixus	Adagio	baritone
Credo	16 min.	Et resurrexit	Allegro	
Credo	16 min.	Et in Spiritum Sanctum	Tempo I	
Credo	16 min.	Et unam sanctam catholicam	Larghetto	
Credo	16 min.	Et vitam venturi saeculi	Andantino	
Sanctus – Benedictus	3 min. 40 s	Sanctus	Andante	
Sanctus – Benedictus	3 min. 40 s	Benedictus	Andantino	baritone
Agnus Dei	2 min. 40 s	Agnus Dei	Andantino	tenor, baritone

== Recordings ==
- Alfonso Scarano (cond.), Aleš Briscein (tenor), Roman Janál (baritone), Czech Philharmonic Choir Brno, North Czech Philharmonic Orchestra Teplice, 2014
- Martin Elmquist (cond.), Marcello Bedoni (tenor), Jeff Speres (baritone), Luxembourg Philarmonia, Classico, 2010
- Karl Rathgeber (cond.), Bernhard Schneider (tenor), Christian Schmidt-Timmermann (baritone), Prague Philharmonic Orchestra, 2006
- Ingo Schulz (cond.), Daniel Magdal (tenor), Stefan Stoll (baritone), Ölberg chor, 2004
- Pier Giorgio Morandi (cond.), Antonello Palombi (tenor), Gunnar Lundberg (baritone), Hungarian Opera Orchestra and Radio Choir, Naxos, 2002
- Jürgen Budday (cond.), Willi Stein (tenor), Thomas Pfeiffer (baritone), Kantorei Maulbronn (Choir), South West German Radio Baden-Baden and Freiburg Symphony Orchestra, K&K Verlagsanstalt, 2001
- Antonio Pappano (cond.), Roberto Alagna (tenor), Thomas Hampson (baritone), London Symphony Orchestra and Chorus, EMI Classics, 2001
- Wilfried Maier (cond.), Rolph Romei (tenor), Guillermo Anzorena (baritone), Schwäbischer Sängerbund, Württembergische Philharmonie Reutlingen, 1999
- Volker Hempfling (cond.), Kölner Philarmoniker, Motette Records, 1995
- András Ligeti (cond.), Dénes Gulyas (tenor), Balazs Poka (baritone), Chœurs de la Radio-Télévision Hongroise, Orchestre Symphonique de Budapest, Hungaroton Classic, 1992
- Claudio Scimone (cond.), José Carreras (tenor), Hermann Prey (baritone), The Ambrosian Singers, Philharmonia Orchestra, Erato, 1984
- Eliahu Inbal (cond.), Kari Løvaas (soprano), Werner Hollweg (tenor), Barry McDaniel, Chor des Westdeutschen Rundfunks, Radio-Sinfonie-Orchester Frankfurt, Philips Classics, 1975
- Michel Corboz (cond.), William Johns (tenor), Philippe Huttenlocher (baritone), Chœur symphonique et orchestre de la foundation Gulbenkian de Lisbonne, Erato, 1974

== Score ==
- Messa di Gloria: Free scores at the Choral Public Domain Library (ChoralWiki)
- G. Puccini: Messa di Gloria - published choral score
- G. Puccini: Messa di Gloria – version for chamber orchestra
