= Giacomo Puccini =

Italian opera composer (1858–1924)

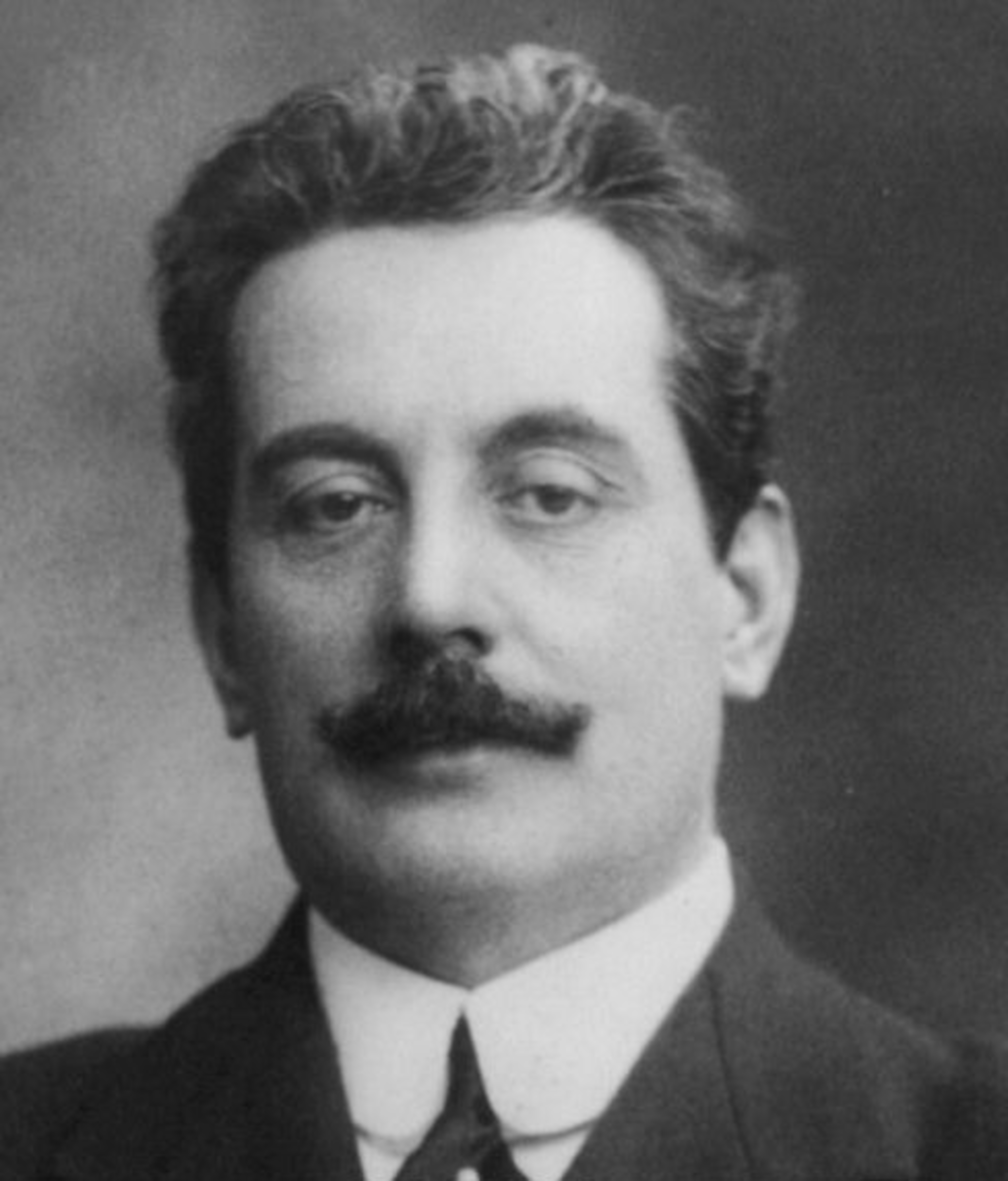
- Puccini in 1908
- Born: Giacomo Antonio Domenico Michele Secondo Maria Puccini; 22 December 1858; Lucca, Grand Duchy of Tuscany
- Died: 29 November 1924 (aged 65); Brussels, Belgium
- Works: List of compositions
- Spouse: Elvira Gemignani (m. 1904)

Giacomo Antonio Domenico Michele Secondo Maria Puccini (Note: Pronunciation: UK: /ˈdʒækəmoʊ pʊˈtʃiːni/ JAK-ə-moh puu-CHEE-nee; US: /ˈdʒɑːkəmoʊ puːˈtʃiːni/ JAH-kə-moh poo-CHEE-nee; Italian: [ˈdʒaːkomo putˈtʃiːni].) (22 December 1858 – 29 November 1924) was an Italian composer known primarily for his operas. Widely regarded as the greatest and most successful proponent of Italian opera after Verdi, he was descended from a long line of composers, stemming from the late Baroque era. Though his early work was firmly rooted in traditional late-nineteenth-century Romantic Italian opera, it later developed in the realistic verismo style, of which he became one of the leading exponents.

His most renowned works are La bohème (1896), Tosca (1900), Madama Butterfly (1904), and the unfinished Turandot (1926, posthumously completed by Franco Alfano), all of which are among the most frequently performed and recorded in the entirety of the operatic repertoire.

== Family and education ==
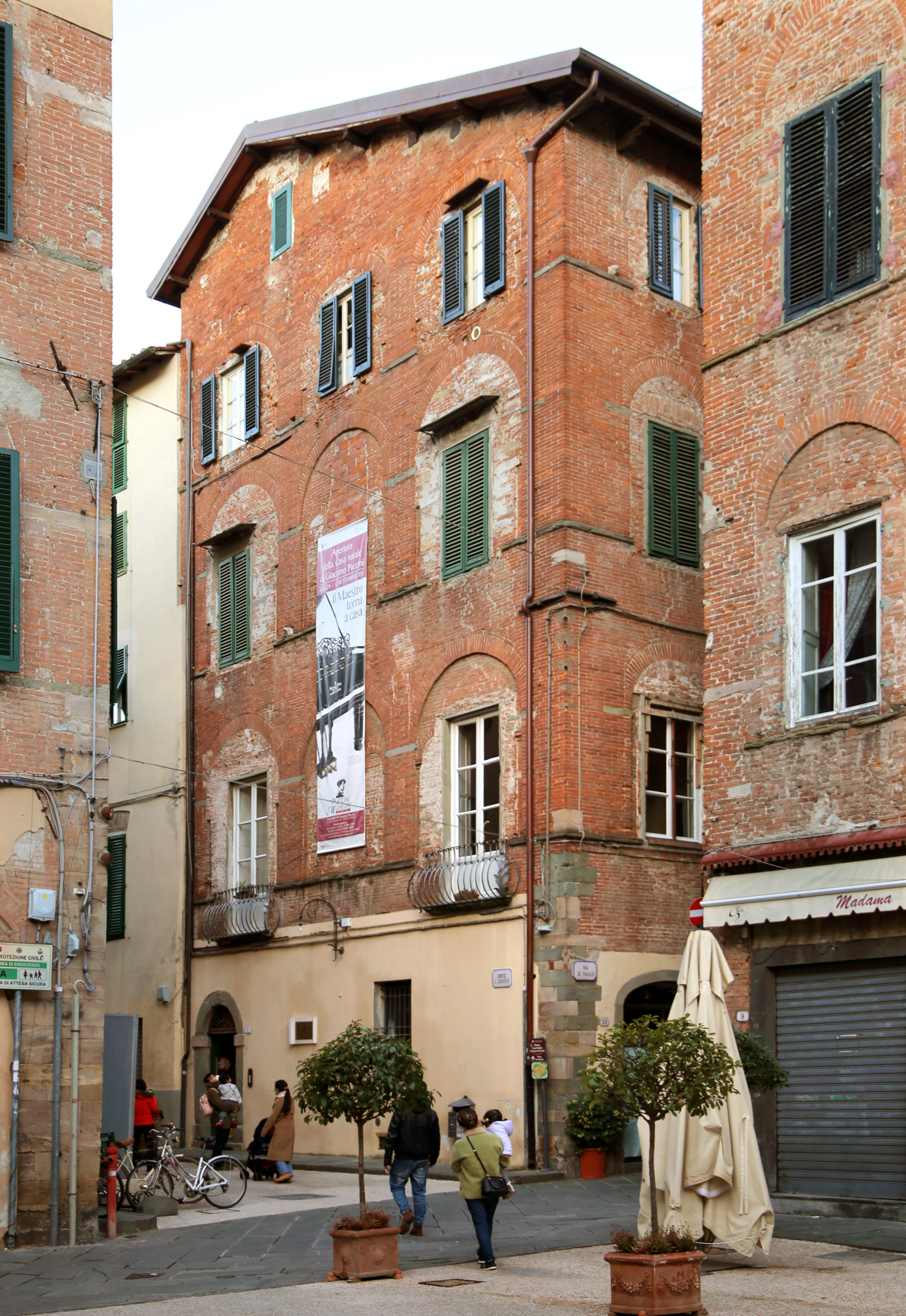
Puccini's birthplace in the Corte San Lorenzo, Lucca; the building presently houses a museum dedicated to his life and œuvre

Born in Lucca in the Grand Duchy of Tuscany, in 1858; he was the sixth of nine children of Michele Puccini (1813–1864) and Albina Magi (1830–1884). The Puccini family was established in Lucca as a local musical dynasty by Puccini's great-great-grandfather – also named Giacomo (1712–1781). This first Giacomo Puccini, though often referred to as Jacopo, was maestro di cappella of the Cattedrale di San Martino in Lucca. He was succeeded in this position by his son, Antonio Puccini, and then by Antonio's son Domenico, and then his son, Michele. Each Puccini studied music at Bologna, and some took additional musical studies elsewhere. Domenico Puccini studied for a time under Giovanni Paisiello. Each composed music for the church. In addition, Domenico composed several operas, and Michele composed one opera. Puccini's father Michele enjoyed a reputation throughout northern Italy, and his funeral was an occasion of public mourning, at which the then-famed composer Giovanni Pacini conducted a Requiem.

With the Puccini family having occupied the position of maestro di cappella for 124 years (1740–1864) by the time of Michele's death, it was anticipated that Michele's son Giacomo would occupy that position as well when he was old enough. However, when Michele Puccini died in 1864, Giacomo was only six years old and thus incapable of assuming his father's post. As a child, he nevertheless participated in the musical life of the Cattedrale di San Martino, as a member of the boys' choir, and later as a substitute organist.

Puccini received a general education at the San Michele seminary in Lucca, and then at the seminary of the cathedral. One of Puccini's uncles, Fortunato Magi, supervised his musical education. In 1880 Puccini achieved a diploma from Lucca's Pacini School of Music, having studied there with Magi, and later with Carlo Angeloni, who had also instructed Alfredo Catalani. A grant from Queen Margherita, and assistance from another uncle, Nicholas Cerù, provided the funds necessary for Puccini to continue his studies at the Milan Conservatory for a further three years; there, he studied composition with Stefano Ronchetti-Monteviti, Amilcare Ponchielli, Amintore Galli, and Antonio Bazzini. He shared his dorm with Pietro Mascagni. Later that year, Puccini composed his Mass, marking the culmination of his family's long association with liturgical music in his native Lucca. (Note: Although Puccini himself correctly titled the work a Messa, referring to a setting of the Ordinary of the Catholic Mass, today the work is popularly known as his Messa di Gloria, a name that technically refers to a setting of only the first two prayers of the Ordinary, the Kyrie and the Gloria, while omitting the Credo, the Sanctus, and the Agnus Dei.)

== Early career and first operas ==
As a thesis piece for the Milan Conservatory, Puccini composed the orchestral Capriccio sinfonico ("Symphonic caprice"). Puccini's teachers, Ponchielli and Bazzini, were impressed by his work, which was subsequently performed at a student concert at the conservatory on 14 July 1883, conducted by Franco Faccio. The Capriccio was favourably reviewed in the Milanese publication La Perseveranza, and thus Puccini began to build a reputation as a young composer of promise in Milanese music circles.

=== Le Villi ===
Following the première of the Capriccio sinfonico, Ponchielli and Puccini discussed the possibility that Puccini's next work might be an opera. Ponchielli invited Puccini to stay at his villa, where Puccini was introduced to Ferdinando Fontana. They agreed to collaborate on an opera, for which Fontana would provide the libretto. Puccini submitted the work, titled Le Villi ('The Fairies'), for Casa Musicale Sonzogno's first of four musical competitions, advertised in April 1883, for a new, unperformed opera "inspired by the best traditions of Italian opera", which could be "idyllic, serious, or comic", to be judged by a panel including Galli and Ponchielli. Puccini's submission was disqualified because its manuscript was illegible; the second competition, in 1889, was notably won by Mascagni's Cavalleria rusticana.

Despite the defeat in the competition, Le Villi was later staged at the Teatro Dal Verme, premiering on 31 May 1884. Casa Ricordi assisted with the première by printing the libretto without charge. Fellow students from the Milan Conservatory formed a large part of the orchestra. The performance was enough of a success that Casa Ricordi purchased the opera. Revised into a two-act version with an intermezzo between the acts, Le Villi was performed at La Scala in Milan, on 24 January 1885. However, Ricordi did not publish the score until 1887, hindering further performance of the work.

=== Edgar ===
Impressed with Le Villi and its composer, music publisher Giulio Ricordi commissioned a second opera from Puccini, which would result in Edgar. Work begun in 1884 when Fontana began working out the scenario for the libretto. Puccini finished primary composition in 1887, and orchestration in 1888. Edgar premiered at La Scala on 21 April 1889 to a lukewarm response. The work was withdrawn for revisions after its third performance. In a Milanese newspaper, Giulio Ricordi published a defence of Puccini's skill as a composer, while criticizing Fontana's libretto. A revised version met with success at the Teatro del Giglio in Puccini's native Lucca on 5 September 1891. In 1892, further revisions reduced the length of the opera from four acts to three, in a version that was well received in Ferrara and was performed in Turin and in Spain. Puccini made further revisions in 1901 and 1905, but the work never achieved popularity. Without the personal support of Ricordi, Edgar might have cost Puccini his career. Puccini had eloped with his former piano student, the married Elvira Gemignani (née Bonturi), and Ricordi's associates were willing to turn a blind eye to his lifestyle as long as he was successful. When Edgar failed, they suggested to Ricordi that he should drop Puccini, but Ricordi said that he would stay with him and continued his allowance until his next opera.

=== Manon Lescaut ===
On commencing his next opera, Manon Lescaut, Puccini announced that he would write his own libretto so that "no fool of a librettist" could spoil it. Ricordi persuaded him to accept Ruggero Leoncavallo as his librettist, but Puccini soon asked Ricordi to remove him from the project. Four other librettists were then involved with the opera, as Puccini constantly changed his mind about the structure of the piece. It was almost by accident that the final two, Luigi Illica and Giuseppe Giacosa, came together to complete the opera.

Manon Lescaut premiered at the Teatro Regio in Turin on 2 February 1893. By coincidence, Puccini's first enduringly popular opera appeared within a week of the premiere of Verdi's last opera, Falstaff, which was first performed on 9 February 1893. In anticipation of the premiere, La Stampa wrote that Puccini was a young man concerning whom "great hopes" had a real basis ("un giovane che è tra i pochi sul quale le larghe speranze non siano benigne illusioni"). Because of the failure of Edgar, however, a failure of Manon Lescaut could have jeopardized Puccini's future as a composer. Although Giulio Ricordi, head of Casa Ricordi, was supportive of Puccini while Manon Lescaut was still in development, the Casa Ricordi board of directors was considering cutting off Puccini's financial support. In any event, "Manon Lescaut was Puccini's first and only uncontested triumph, acclaimed by critics and public alike." After the London premiere in 1894, George Bernard Shaw pronounced: "Puccini looks to me more like the heir of Verdi than any of his rivals."

== Middle career ==
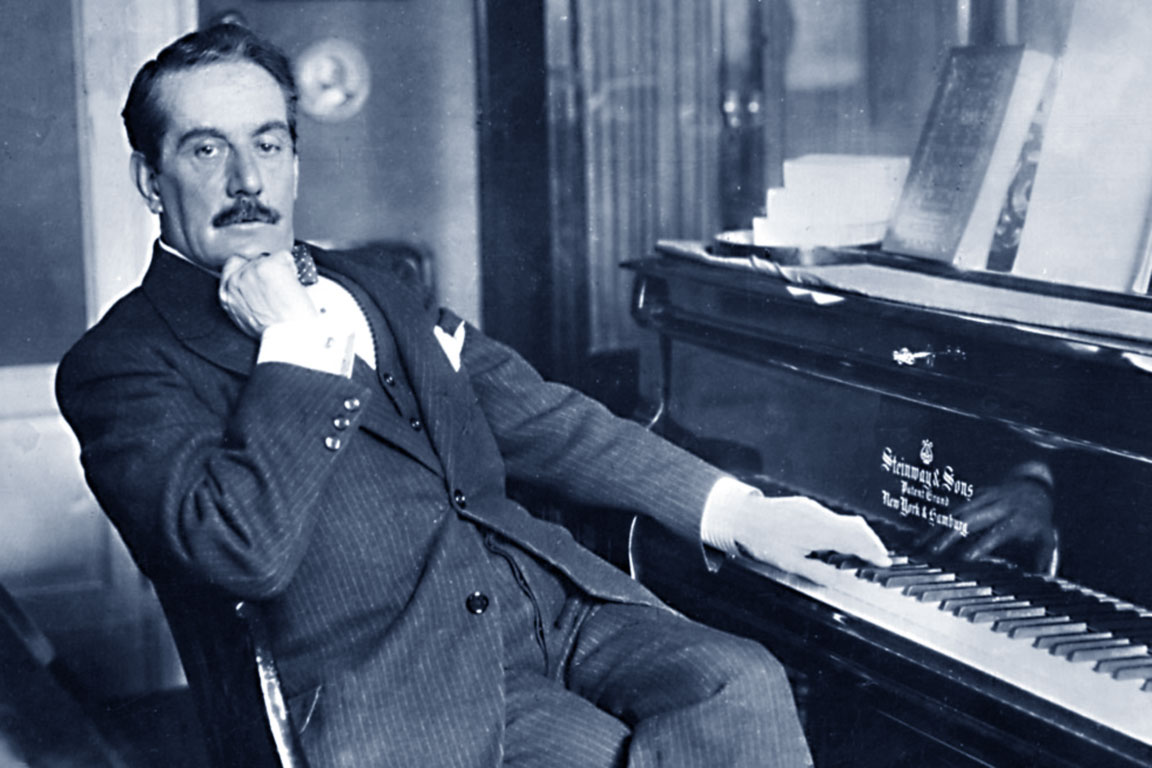
Puccini photographed with his piano in 1900

=== La bohème ===
Puccini's next work after Manon Lescaut was La bohème ("The bohemian lifestyle"), a four-act opera based on Henri Murger's La Vie de Bohème (1851). La bohème premiered in Turin in 1896, conducted by Arturo Toscanini. Within a few years, it had been performed in many of the leading opera houses of Europe, including in Britain, as well as in the United States. It was a popular success and remains one of the most frequently performed operas ever written.

The libretto of the opera, freely adapted from Murger's episodic novel, combines comic elements of the impoverished life of the young protagonists with tragic aspects, such as the death of the young seamstress Mimí. Puccini's own life as a young man in Milan served as a source of inspiration for elements of the libretto. During his years as a conservatory student and in the years before Manon Lescaut, he experienced poverty similar to that of the bohemians in La bohème, including a chronic shortage of necessities like food, clothing and money to pay rent. Although Puccini was granted a small monthly stipend by the Congregation of Charity in Rome (Congregazione di caritá), he frequently had to pawn his possessions to cover basic expenses. Early biographers such as Wakeling Dry and Eugenio Checchi, who were Puccini's contemporaries, drew express parallels between these incidents and particular events in the opera. Checchi cited a diary kept by Puccini while he was still a student, which recorded an occasion in which, as in Act 4 of the opera, a single herring served as a dinner for four people. Puccini himself commented: "I lived that Bohème, when there wasn't yet any thought stirring in my brain of seeking the theme of an opera". ("Quella Bohème io l'ho vissuta, quando ancora non mi mulinava nel cervello l'idea di cercarvi l'argomento per un'opera in musica.")

Puccini's composition of La bohème was the subject of a public dispute between Puccini and Ruggiero Leoncavallo. In early 1893, the two composers discovered that they were both engaged in writing operas based on Murger's work. Leoncavallo had started his work first, and he and his music publisher claimed to have "priority" on the subject (although Murger's work was in the public domain). Puccini responded that he started his own work without having any knowledge of Leoncavallo's project, and wrote: "Let him compose. I will compose. The audience will decide." Puccini's opera premiered a year before that of Leoncavallo, and has been a perennial audience favourite, while Leoncavallo's version quickly faded into obscurity.

=== Tosca ===
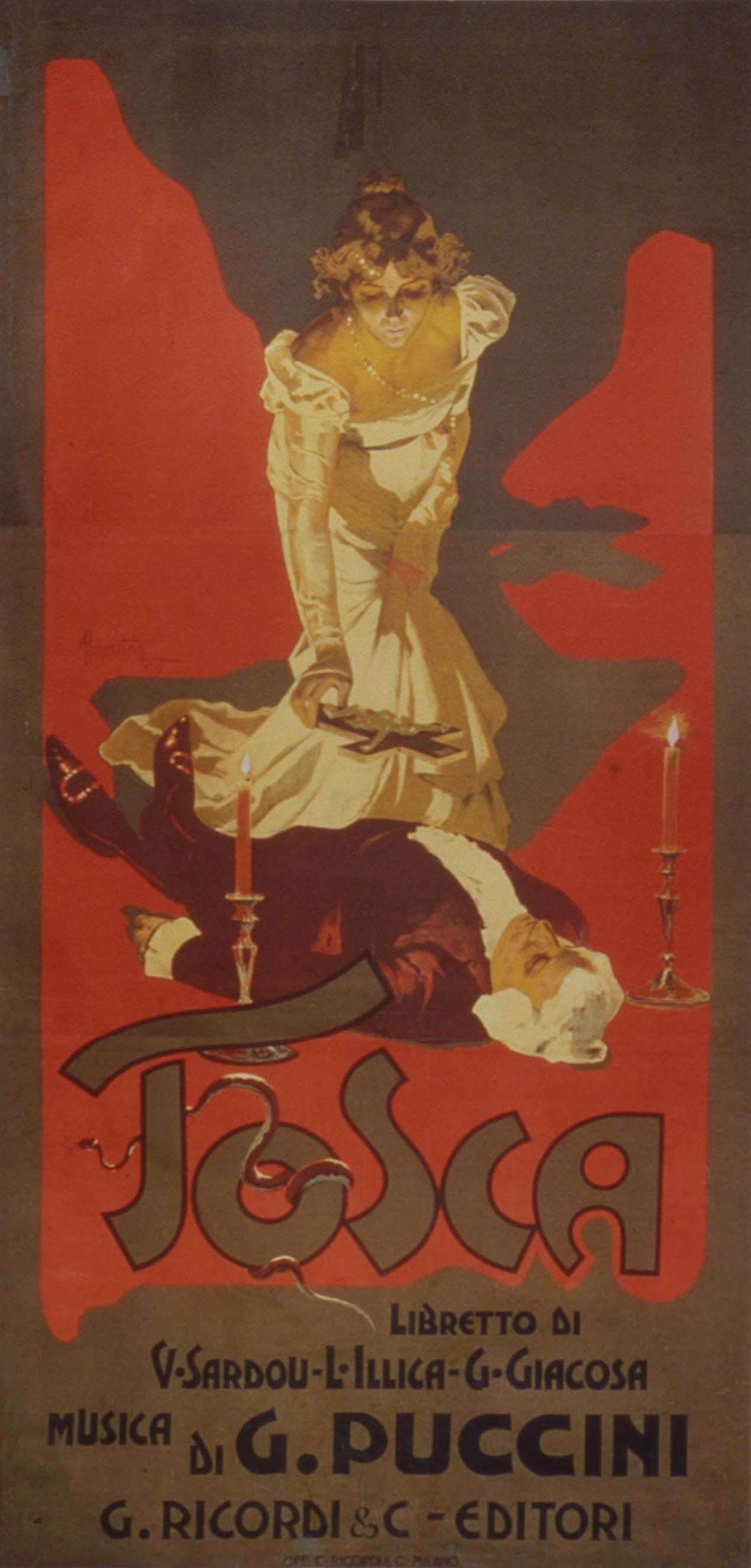
Original poster for Puccini's Tosca

Puccini's next work after La bohème was Tosca (1900), arguably Puccini's first foray into verismo, the realistic depiction of many facets of real life including violence. Puccini had been considering an opera on this theme since he saw the play Tosca by Victorien Sardou in 1889, when he wrote to his publisher, Giulio Ricordi, begging him to get Sardou's permission for the work to be made into an opera: "I see in this Tosca the opera I need, with no overblown proportions, no elaborate spectacle, nor will it call for the usual excessive amount of music."

The music of Tosca employs musical signatures for particular characters and emotions, which have been compared to leitmotivs, and some contemporaries saw Puccini as thereby adopting a new musical style influenced by Richard Wagner. Others viewed the work differently. Rejecting the allegation that Tosca displayed Wagnerian influences, a critic reporting on the Torino premiere of 20 February 1900 wrote: "I don't think you could find a more Puccinian score than this."

=== Automobile crash and near-death ===
On 25 February 1903, Puccini was seriously injured in a car crash during a nighttime journey on the road from Lucca to Torre del Lago. The car was driven by Puccini's chauffeur and was carrying Puccini, his future wife Elvira, and their son Antonio. It went off the road, fell several metres, and flipped over. Elvira and Antonio were flung from the car and escaped with minor injuries. Puccini's chauffeur, also thrown from the car, suffered a serious fracture of his femur. Puccini was pinned under the vehicle, with a severe fracture of his right leg and with a portion of the car pressing down on his chest. A doctor living near the scene of the crash, together with another person who came to investigate, saved Puccini from the wreckage. The injury did not heal well, and Puccini remained under treatment for months. During the medical examinations that he underwent it was also found that he was suffering from a form of diabetes. The accident and its consequences slowed Puccini's completion of his next work.

=== Madama Butterfly ===
The original version of Madama Butterfly ("Madam Butterfly") premiered at La Scala on 17 February 1904 with Rosina Storchio in the title role. It was initially greeted with great hostility (probably largely owing to inadequate rehearsals). When Storchio's kimono accidentally lifted during the performance, some in the audience started shouting: "The butterfly is pregnant" and "There is the little Toscanini". The latter comment referred to her well-publicised affair with Arturo Toscanini. This version was in two acts; after its disastrous premiere, Puccini withdrew the opera, revising it for what was virtually a second premiere at Brescia in May 1904 and performances in Buenos Aires, London, the US and Paris. In 1907, Puccini made his final revisions to the opera in a fifth version, which has become known as the "standard version". Today, the standard version of the opera is the version most often performed around the world. However, the original 1904 version is occasionally performed as well, and has been recorded. Puccini incorporated elements of Japanese music into his score and "tried to make B. F. Pinkerton sound like an American."

== Later works ==
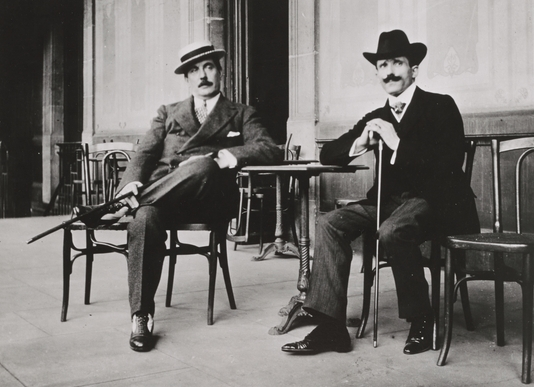
Puccini and Toscanini

After 1904, Puccini's compositions were less frequent. In 1906 Giacosa died and, in 1909, there was a scandal after Puccini's wife, Elvira, falsely accused their maid Doria Manfredi of having an affair with Puccini. Finally, in 1912, the death of Giulio Ricordi, Puccini's editor and publisher, ended a productive period of his career.

Giorgio Polacco recalled the tempestuous relationship between Puccini and Toscanini. Puccini sent Toscanini some panettone. The composer recalled that they were not on speaking terms and wired him "PANETTONE SENT BY MISTAKE. PUCCINI." The conductor wired back: "PANETTONE EATEN BY MISTAKE. TOSCANINI.”

=== La fanciulla del West ===
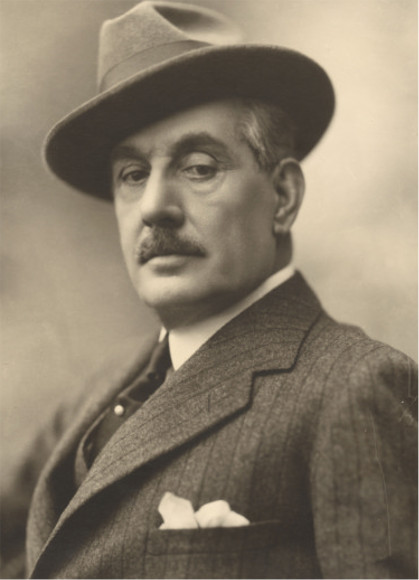
Puccini, 1910

Puccini completed La fanciulla del West ("The Damsel of the West"), based on a play by David Belasco, in 1910. This was commissioned by, and first performed at, the Metropolitan Opera in New York on 10 December 1910 with Met stars Enrico Caruso and Emmy Destinn, for whom Puccini created the leading roles of Dick Johnson and Minnie. Toscanini, then the musical director of the Met, conducted. This was the first world premiere of an opera at the Met. The premiere was a great success. However, the compositional style employed in the opera, with few stand-alone arias, was criticized at the time. Some contemporaries also criticized the opera for failing to achieve an "American" tone. However, the opera has been acclaimed for its incorporation of advanced harmonic language and rhythmic complexity into the Italian operatic form. In addition, one aria from the opera, Ch'ella mi creda, has become a staple of compilation albums by operatic tenors. It is said that during World War I, Italian soldiers sang this aria to maintain their spirits. The 2008 Italian film Puccini e la fanciulla (Puccini and the Girl), is based on the period of his life when he was composing the opera. Puccini studied American folk music "in order to get the atmosphere.”

=== La rondine ===
Puccini completed the score of La rondine ("The Swallow") to a libretto by Giuseppe Adami in 1916 after two years of work, and it was premiered at the Grand Théâtre de Monte Carlo on 27 March 1917. The opera had been originally commissioned by Vienna's Carltheater; however, the outbreak of World War I prevented the premiere from being given there. Moreover, the firm of Ricordi had declined the score of the opera – Giulio Ricordi's son Tito was then in charge and he described the opera as "bad Lehár". It was taken up by their rival, Lorenzo Sonzogno, who arranged the first performance in neutral Monaco. The composer continued to work at revising this, the least known of his mature operas, until his death.

La rondine was initially conceived as an operetta, but Puccini eliminated spoken dialogue, rendering the work closer in form to an opera. A modern reviewer described La rondine as "a continuous fabric of lilting waltz tunes, catchy pop-styled melodies, and nostalgic love music," while characterizing the plot as recycling characters and incidents from works like La traviata and Die Fledermaus.

=== Il trittico: Il tabarro, Suor Angelica, and Gianni Schicchi ===
In 1918, Il trittico ("The Triptych") premiered in New York. This work is composed of three one-act operas, each concerning the concealment of a death: a horrific episode (Il tabarro; "The Cloak") in the style of the Parisian Grand Guignol, a sentimental tragedy (Suor Angelica; "Sister Angelica"), and a comedy (Gianni Schicchi).

=== Turandot ===
Turandot, Puccini's final opera, was left unfinished at the composer's death in November 1924, and the last two scenes were completed by Franco Alfano based on the composer's sketches. The libretto for Turandot was based on a play of the same name by Carlo Gozzi. The music of the opera is heavily inflected with pentatonic motifs, intended to produce an Asiatic flavour to the music. Turandot contains a number of memorable stand-alone arias, among them "Nessun dorma".

== Librettists ==
The libretto of Edgar was a significant factor in the failure of that opera. Thereafter, especially throughout his middle and late career, Puccini was extremely selective, and at times indecisive, in his choice of subject matter for new works. Puccini was deeply involved in the process of writing the libretto itself, requiring many iterative revisions of his libretti in terms of both structure and text. Puccini's relationships with his librettists were at times very difficult. His publisher, Casa Ricordi, was frequently required to mediate disputes and impasses between them.

Puccini explored many possible subjects that he ultimately rejected only after a significant amount of effort—such as the creation of a libretto—had been put into them. Among the subjects that Puccini seriously considered, but abandoned, were: Cristoforo Sly, Anima Allegra (based on the play El genio alegre by Serafín and Joaquín Álvarez Quintero), Two Little Wooden Shoes (I due zoccoletti) (a short story by Maria Louise Ramé, a.k.a. Ouida), the life of Marie Antoinette, Margherita da Cortona, and Conchita (based on the novel La Femme et le pantin – The Woman and the Puppet, by Pierre Loüys). Some of these abandoned subjects were taken up and turned into operas by other composers. For example, Franco Vittadini made an opera of Anima Allegra, Mascagni's opera Lodoletta is derived from Two Little Wooden Shoes, and Riccardo Zandonai eventually wrote Conchita.

== Torre del Lago ==
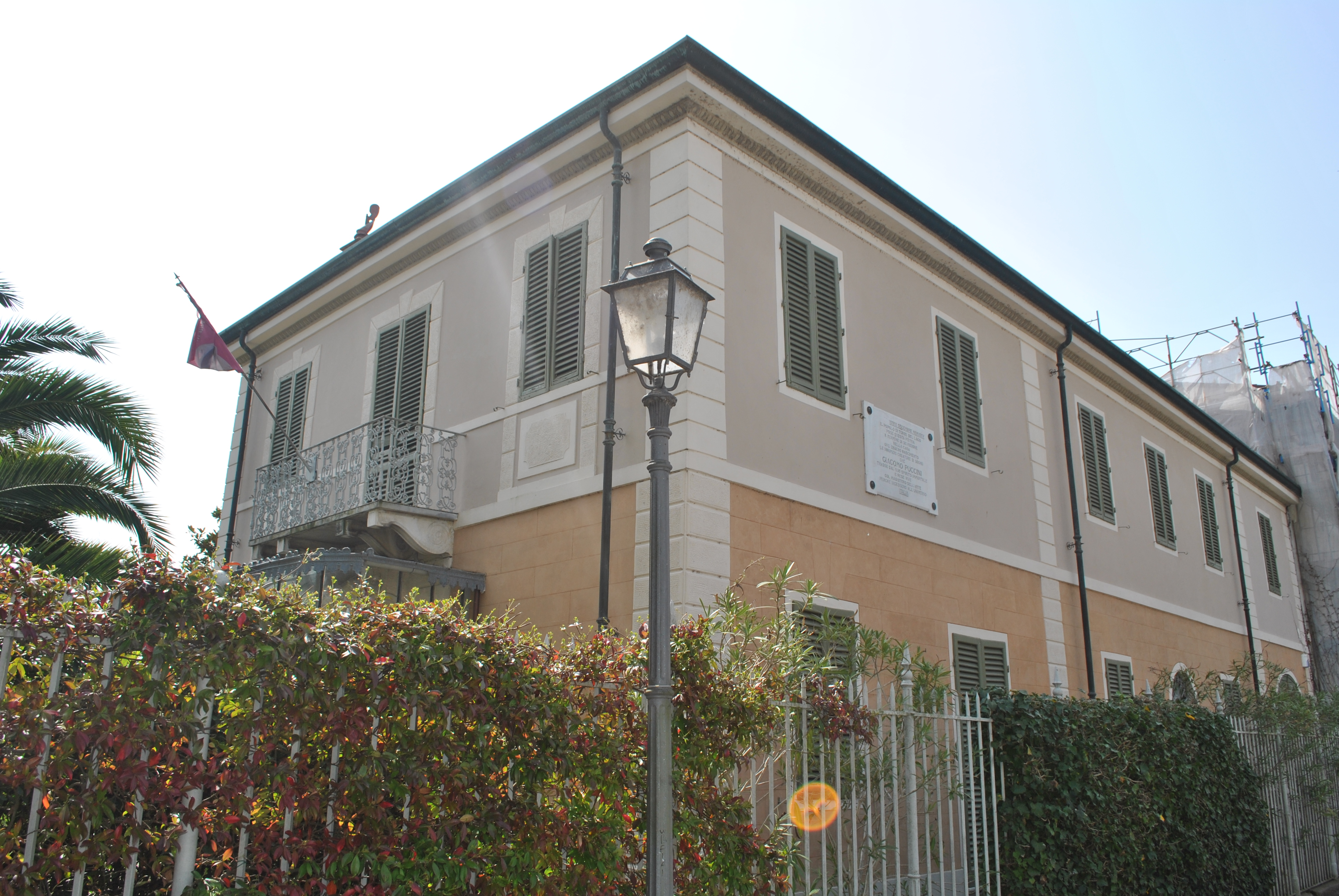
Villa Puccini, Torre del Lago

From 1891 onwards, Puccini spent most of his time, when not travelling on business, at Torre del Lago, a small community about fifteen miles from Lucca situated between the Ligurian Sea and Lake Massaciuccoli, just south of Viareggio. Torre del Lago was the primary place for Puccini to indulge his love of hunting. "I love hunting, I love cars: and for these things, in the isolation of Torre del Lago, I keep the faith." ("Amo la caccia, adoro l'automobile: e a questo e a quella nelle solitudini di Torre del Lago serbo intera la mia fede.")

By 1900, he had acquired land and built a villa on the lake, now known as the "Villa Puccini". He lived there until 1921, when pollution produced by peat works on the lake forced him to move to Viareggio, a few kilometres north. After his death, a mausoleum was created in the Villa Puccini and the composer is buried there in the chapel, along with his wife and son who died later.

The Villa Museo was owned by his granddaughter, Simonetta Puccini, until her death, and is open to the public. An annual Festival Puccini is held at Torre del Lago.

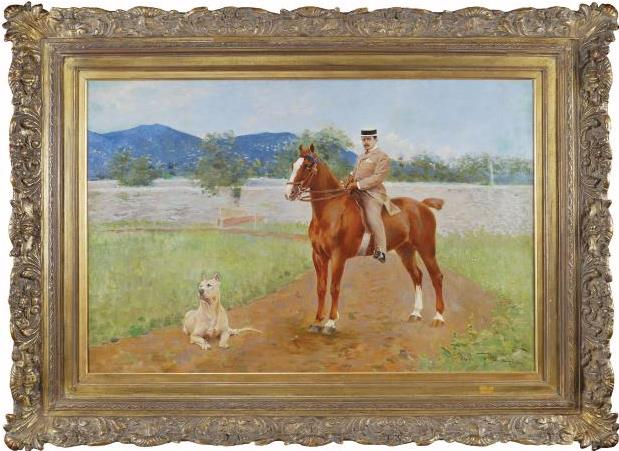
Puccini on horseback; by Aleardo Villa

== Marriage and affairs ==
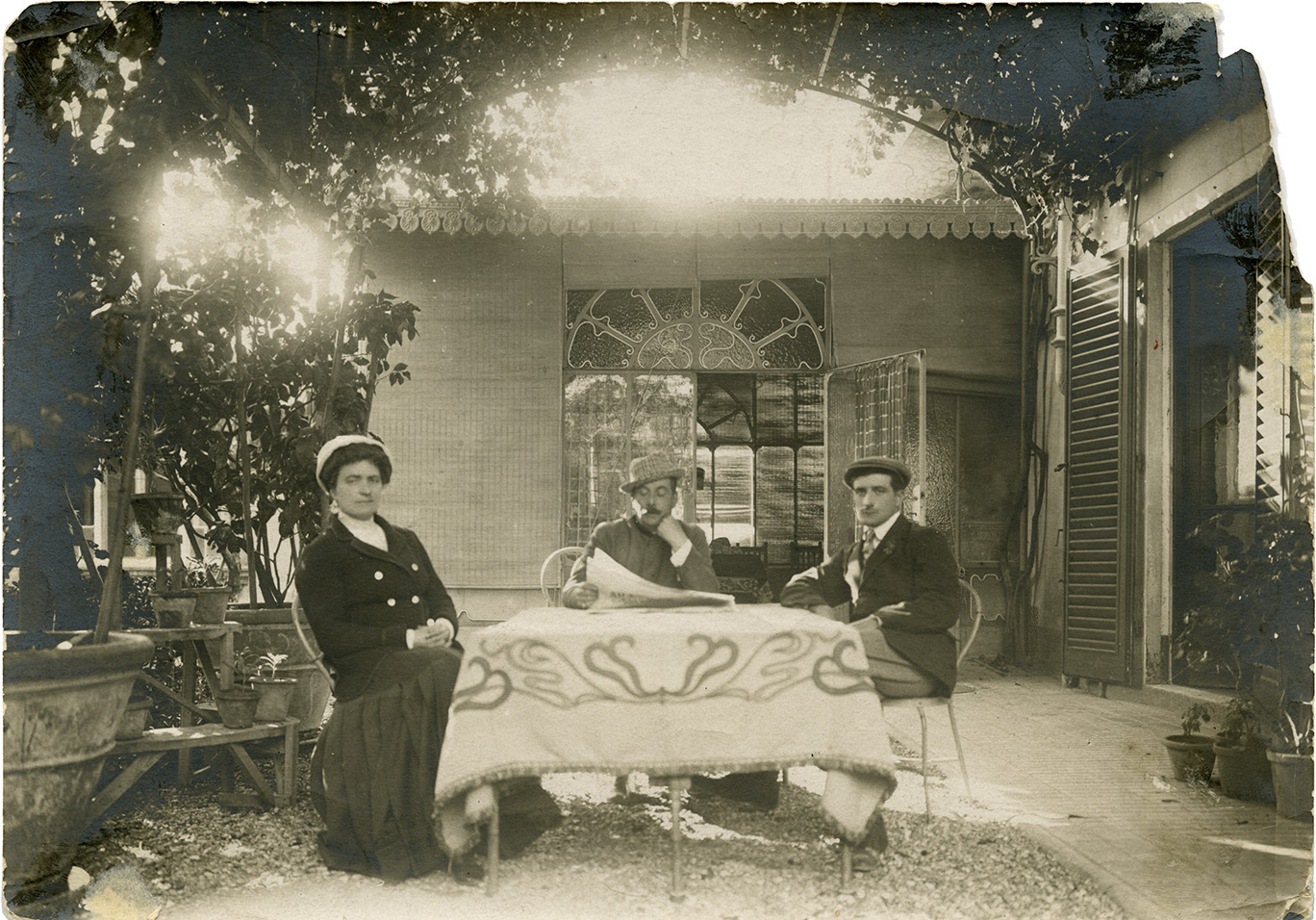
Puccini with his wife Elvira and son Antonio, 1900

In the autumn of 1884, in Lucca, Puccini began a relationship with a married woman named Elvira Gemignani (née Bonturi; 1860–1930), a former piano student of his. Elvira's husband, Narciso Gemignani, was an "unrepentant womanizer", and Elvira's marriage was not a happy one. Elvira became pregnant by Puccini, and their son, Antonio (1886–1946), was born in Monza. Elvira left Lucca when the pregnancy began to show and gave birth elsewhere to avoid gossip. Elvira, Antonio and Elvira's daughter by Narciso, Fosca (1880–1968), began to live with Puccini shortly afterwards. Narciso was killed by the husband of a woman that Narciso had an affair with, dying on 26 February 1903, one day after Puccini's car accident. Only then, in early 1904, were Puccini and Elvira able to marry, and to legitimize Antonio.

The marriage between Puccini and Elvira was also troubled by infidelity, as Puccini had frequent affairs himself, including with well-known singers such as Maria Jeritza, Emmy Destinn, Cesira Ferrani, and Hariclea Darclée. In 1906, while attending the opening of Madama Butterfly in Budapest, Puccini fell in love with Blanke Lendvai, the sister of Hungarian composer Ervin Lendvai (his friend and protégé for many years). Blanke and Puccini exchanged love letters until 1911, when he started an affair with German aristocrat Baroness Josephine von Stangel, which lasted for six years.

In 1909, Puccini's wife Elvira publicly accused Doria Manfredi, a maid working for the Puccini family, of having an affair with the composer. After the accusation, Manfredi committed suicide. However, an autopsy determined that Manfredi had died a virgin, refuting the allegations made against her. Elvira Puccini was prosecuted for slander and was sentenced to more than five months in prison, although a payment to the Manfredi family by Puccini spared Elvira from having to serve the sentence. Some music critics and interpreters of Puccini's work have speculated that the psychological effects of this incident on Puccini interfered with his ability to complete compositions later in his career, and also influenced the development of his characters such as Liù (from Turandot), a slave girl who dies tragically by suicide.

In 2007, documents were found in the possession of Nadia Manfredi, a descendant of the Manfredi family, which indicated that Puccini was actually having an affair with Giulia Manfredi, Doria's cousin. Upon the discovery of these documents, the press began to allege that Puccini had fathered Giulia Manfredi's son Antonio, which would make Nadia a granddaughter of Puccini.

== Politics ==
Unlike Wagner and Verdi, Puccini was not active in politics. Puccini biographer Mary Jane Phillips-Matz wrote: "Throughout this entire period [of World War I and its immediate aftermath], Puccini's interest in politics was close to zero, as it had been all his life, so far as one can judge. He seemed almost indifferent to everything from mayoral elections in Viareggio to cabinet appointments in Rome." Another biographer speculates that Puccini may have been—if he had a political philosophy—a monarchist.

Puccini's indifference to politics caused him problems during World War I. Puccini's long-standing and close friendship with Toscanini was interrupted for nearly a decade because of an argument in the summer of 1914 (in the opening months of the war) during which Puccini remarked that Italy could benefit from German organization. Puccini was also criticized during the war for his work on La rondine under a 1913 commission contract with an Austrian theater after Italy and Austria-Hungary became opponents in the war in 1915 (although the contract was ultimately cancelled). Puccini did not participate in the public war effort, but privately rendered assistance to individuals and families affected by the war.

In 1919, Puccini was commissioned to write music to an ode by Fausto Salvatori honouring Italy's victories in World War I. The work, Inno a Roma (Hymn to Rome), was to premiere on 21 April 1919, during a celebration of the anniversary of the founding of Rome. The premiere was delayed to 1 June 1919, when it was played at the opening of a gymnastics competition. Although not written for the fascists, Inno a Roma was widely played during Fascist street parades and public ceremonies.

Puccini had some contact with Benito Mussolini and the Italian Fascist Party in the year preceding his death. In 1923 the Fascist Party in Viareggio made Puccini an honorary member and sent him a membership card. However, evidence that Puccini was actually a member of the Fascist Party is ambiguous. The Italian Senate has traditionally included a small number of members appointed in recognition of their cultural contributions to the nation. Puccini hoped to attain this honour, which had been granted to Verdi, and undertook to use his connections to bring about the appointment. While honorary senators could vote, there is no indication that Puccini sought the appointment for this purpose. Puccini also wished to establish a national theatre in Viareggio, a project which would require government support. Puccini met with Mussolini twice, in November and December 1923, seeking support for the theatre project. While the theatre project never came to fruition, Puccini was named Senator (senatore a vita) a few months before his death.

At the time Puccini met with Mussolini, Mussolini had been prime minister for approximately a year, but his party had not yet taken full control of the Italian Parliament through the violence and irregularities of the 1924 general election. Puccini was no longer alive when Mussolini announced the end of representative government and the beginning of a fascist dictatorship, in his speech before the Chamber of Deputies on 3 January 1925.

== Death ==
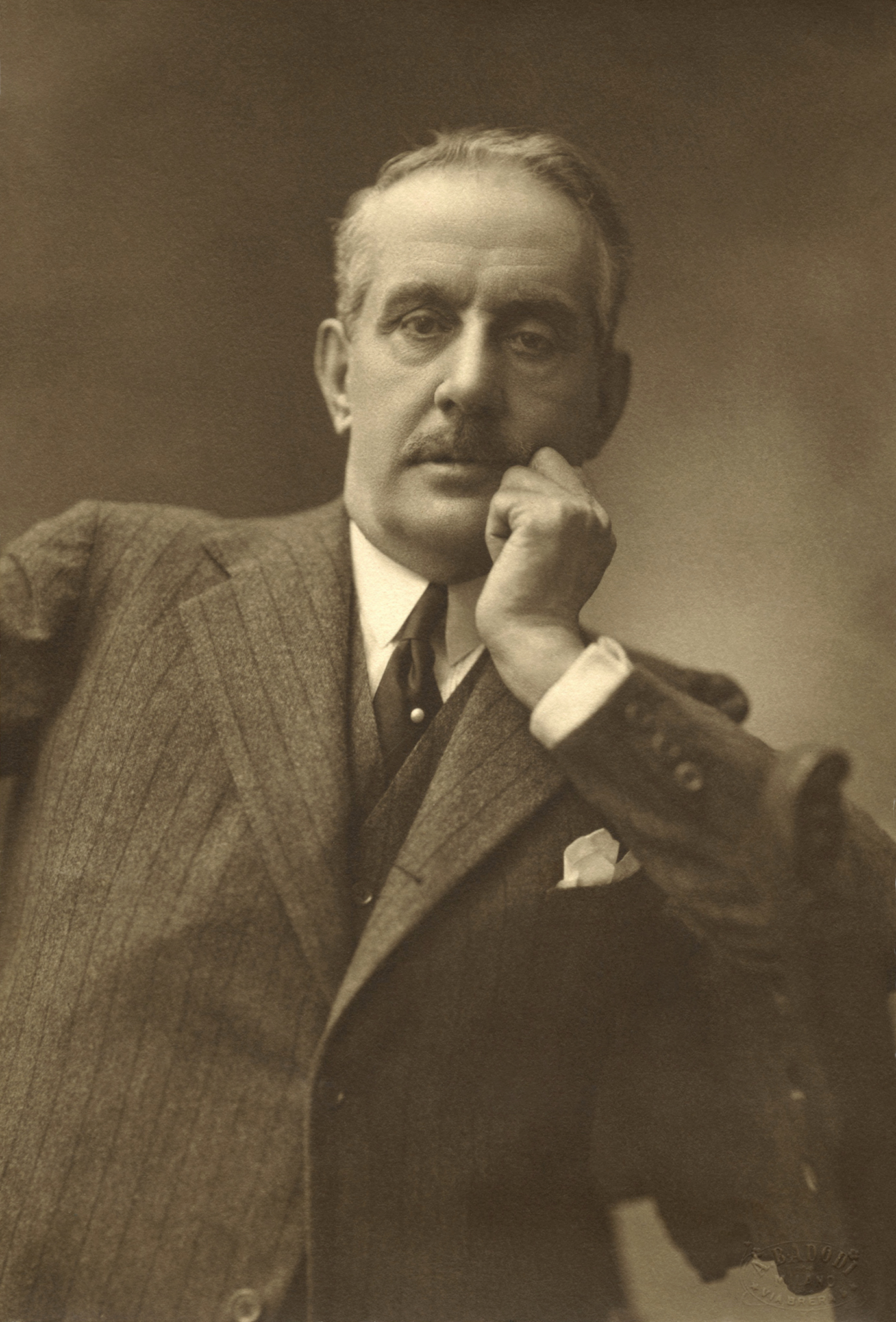
Puccini, 1924

A chain smoker of Toscano cigars and cigarettes, Puccini began to complain of a chronic sore throat towards the end of 1923. A diagnosis of throat cancer led his doctors to recommend a new and experimental radiation therapy treatment which was being offered in Brussels. Puccini and his wife never understood how serious the cancer was, as the news was revealed only to his son.

Puccini died in Brussels on 29 November 1924, aged 65, from complications after the treatment; uncontrolled bleeding led to a heart attack the day after surgery. Although not a fervent Catholic, Puccini received the last sacraments from Cardinal Clemente Micara, who was also a cello player and fellow musician as well as a personal friend of the composer. News of his death reached Rome during a performance of La bohème. The opera was immediately stopped, and the orchestra played Chopin's Funeral March for the stunned audience.

His funeral took place at Saint Mary's Royal Church in Schaerbeek, Brussels. He was buried in Milan, in Toscanini's family tomb, but that was always intended as a temporary measure. In 1926, on the 2nd anniversary of his death, his son arranged to transfer his father's remains to a specially created chapel inside the Puccini villa at Torre del Lago.

== Style and critical reception ==
Most broadly, Puccini wrote in the style of the late-Romantic period of classical music (see Romantic music). Music historians also refer to Puccini as a component of the giovane scuola ("young school"), a cohort of composers who came onto the Italian operatic scene as Verdi's career came to an end, such as Mascagni, Leoncavallo, and others mentioned below. Puccini is also frequently referred to as a verismo composer.

Puccini's career extended from the end of the Romantic period into the modern period. He consciously attempted to 'update' his style to keep pace with new trends but did not attempt to fully adopt a modern style. One critic, Andrew Davis, has stated: "Loyalty toward nineteenth-century Italian-opera traditions and, more generally, toward the musical language of his Tuscan heritage is one of the clearest features of Puccini's music." Davis also identifies, however, a "stylistic pluralism" in Puccini's work, including influences from "the German symphonic tradition, French harmonic and orchestrational traditions, and, to a lesser extent, aspects of Wagnerian chromaticism". In addition, Puccini frequently sought to introduce music or sounds from outside sources into his operas, such as his use of Chinese folk melodies in Turandot.

All of Puccini's operas have at least one set piece for a lead singer that is separate enough from its surroundings that it can be treated as a distinct aria, and most of his works have several of these. At the same time, Puccini's work continued the trend away from operas constructed from a series of set pieces, and instead used a more "through-composed" or integrated construction. His works are strongly melodic. In orchestration, Puccini frequently doubled the vocal line in unison or at octaves in order to emphasize and strengthen the melodic line.

Verismo is a style of Italian opera that began in 1890 with the first performance of Mascagni's Cavalleria rusticana, peaked in the early 1900s, and lingered into the 1920s. The style is distinguished by realistic – sometimes sordid or violent – depictions of everyday life, especially the life of the contemporary lower classes. Verismo does not usually employ the historical or mythical subjects associated with Romanticism. Cavalleria rusticana, Pagliacci, and Andrea Chénier are uniformly considered to be verismo operas. Puccini's career as a composer is almost entirely coincident in time with the verismo movement. Only his Le Villi and Edgar preceded Cavalleria rusticana. Some view Puccini as essentially a verismo composer, while others, although acknowledging that he took part in the movement to some degree, do not view him as a "pure" verismo composer. In addition, critics differ as to the degree to which particular operas by Puccini are, or are not, properly described as verismo operas. Two of Puccini's operas, Tosca and Il Tabarro, are universally considered to be verismo operas. Puccini scholar Mosco Carner places only two of Puccini's operas other than Tosca and Il tabarro within the verismo school: Madama Butterfly, and La Fanciulla del West. Because only three verismo works that were not composed by Puccini continue to appear regularly on stage (the aforementioned Cavalleria rusticana, Pagliacci, and Andrea Chénier), Puccini's contribution has had lasting significance to the genre.

Both during his lifetime and in posterity, Puccini's success outstripped other Italian opera composers of his time, and he has been matched in this regard by only a handful of composers in the entire history of opera. Between 2004 and 2018, Puccini ranked third (behind Verdi and Mozart) in the number of performances of his operas worldwide, as surveyed by Operabase. Three of his operas (La bohème, Tosca, and Madama Butterfly) were amongst the 10 most frequently performed operas worldwide.

Gustav Kobbé, the original author of The Complete Opera Book, a standard reference work on opera, wrote in the 1919 edition: "Puccini is considered the most important figure in operatic Italy today, the successor of Verdi, if there is any." Other contemporaries shared this view. Italian opera composers of the generation with whom Puccini was compared included Pietro Mascagni, Ruggero Leoncavallo, Umberto Giordano, Francesco Cilea, Baron Pierantonio Tasca, Gaetano Coronaro, and Alberto Franchetti. Only three composers, and three works, by Italian contemporaries of Puccini appear on the Operabase list of most-performed works: Cavalleria rusticana by Mascagni, Pagliacci by Ruggero Leoncavallo, and Andrea Chénier by Umberto Giordano. Kobbé contrasted Puccini's ability to achieve "sustained" success with the failure of Mascagni and Leoncavallo to produce more than merely "one sensationally successful short opera". By the time of Puccini's death in 1924, he had earned $4 million from his works.

Although the popular success of Puccini's work is undeniable, and his mastery of the craft of composition has been consistently recognized, opinion among critics as to the artistic value of his work has always been divided. Grove Music Online described Puccini's strengths as a composer as follows:

Puccini succeeded in mastering the orchestra as no other Italian had done before him, creating new forms by manipulating structures inherited from the great Italian tradition, loading them with bold harmonic progressions which had little or nothing to do with what was happening then in Italy, though they were in step with the work of French, Austrian and German colleagues.

Anton Webern wrote to Arnold Schoenberg, describing La funiculla del West' as “a score with an original sound throughout, splendid, every bar a surprise. …. I must say I enjoyed it very much. Am I wrong?” Puccini attended a performance of Schoenberg's Pierrot Lunaire. Schoenberg was touched: "I was indeed honored that Puccini, not an exper judge but a practical expert, already ill, made a six-hour journey to get to know my work, and afterwards said some very friendly things to me; that was good; strange though my music may have remained to him."

Puccini has influenced popular culture. Jonathan Larson's rock musical Rent is a modern reworking of La Boheme. Pinkerton, an album by the band Weezer, takes inspiration from Madama Butterly. Rivers Cuomo explains: "I went back to school to study music, and one of the things I got into was the Italian opera composer Puccini. One of my favorite operas by him was Madama Butterfly, specifically when the role was played by Maria Callas. On tour, I would listen to her every night after the show and be so moved by the depth of emotion and sadness and tragedy." The American songwriter Tom Waits, who has written operas with Robert Wilson, recalls hearing "Nessun Dorma" from Turandot "in the kitchen at Coppola's with Raul Julia one night, and it changed my life, that particular Aria. ... It was like giving a cigar to a five-year old. I turned blue, and I cried."

In his work on Puccini, Julian Budden describes Puccini as a gifted and original composer, noting the innovation hidden in the popularity of works such as "Che gelida manina". He describes the aria in musical terms (the signature embedded in the harmony for example), and points out that its structure was rather unheard of at the time, having three distinct musical paragraphs that nonetheless form a complete and coherent whole. This gumption in musical experimentation was the essence of Puccini's style, as evidenced in his diverse settings and use of the motif to express ideas beyond those in the story and text.

Puccini has, however, consistently been the target of condescension by some music critics who find his music insufficiently sophisticated or difficult. Some have explicitly condemned his efforts to please his audience, such as this contemporary Italian critic:

He willingly stops himself at minor genius, stroking the taste of the public ... obstinately shunning too-daring innovation ... A little heroism, but not taken to great heights; a little bit of veristic comedy, but brief; a lot of sentiment and romantic idyll: this is the recipe in which he finds happiness. ([E]gli si arresta volentieri alla piccola genialità, accarezzando il gusto del pubblico ... rifuggendo ostinato dalle troppo ardite innovazioni. ... Un po' di eroismo, ma non spinto a grandi altezze, un po' di commedia verista, ma breve; molto idillio sentimentale e romantico: ecco la ricetta in cui egli compiace.)

Budden attempted to explain the paradox of Puccini's immense popular success and technical mastery on the one hand, and the relative disregard in which his work has been held by academics:

No composer communicates more directly with an audience than Puccini. Indeed, for many years he has remained a victim of his own popularity; hence the resistance to his music in academic circles. Be it remembered, however, that Verdi's melodies were once dismissed as barrel-organ fodder. The truth is that music that appeals immediately to a public becomes subject to bad imitation, which can cast a murky shadow over the original. So long as counterfeit Puccinian melody dominated the world of sentimental operetta, many found it difficult to come to terms with the genuine article. Now that the current coin of light music has changed, the composer admired by Schoenberg, Ravel, and Stravinsky can be seen to emerge in his full stature.

== Puccini studies ==
Founded in 1996 in Lucca, the Centro di studi Giacomo Puccini embraces a wide range of approaches to the study of Puccini's work. In the US, the American Center for Puccini Studies specializes in the presentation of unusual performing editions of the composer's works and introduces neglected or unknown Puccini pieces. It was founded in 2004 by the singer and director Harry Dunstan.

== Works ==
"Donna non vidi mai"
From Manon Lescaut, act 1; Enrico Caruso (1913)

"O soave fanciulla"
From La bohème, act 1; Caruso and Nellie Melba (1906)

"O mio babbino caro"
From Gianni Schicchi, Frances Alda (1919)

Puccini wrote orchestral pieces, sacred music, chamber music, solo music for piano and organ and songs for voice and piano, most notably his 1880 mass Messa di gloria, his Preludio Sinfonico of 1882, and his 1890 string quartet movement Crisantemi. However, he is primarily known for his operas:

- Le Villi, libretto by Ferdinando Fontana (in one act – premiered at the Teatro Dal Verme, 31 May 1884)
- Edgar, libretto by Ferdinando Fontana (in four acts – premiered at La Scala, 21 April 1889)
- Manon Lescaut, libretto by Luigi Illica, Giuseppe Giacosa, Marco Praga and Domenico Oliva (in four acts – premiered at the Teatro Regio, 1 February 1893)
- La bohème, libretto by Luigi Illica and Giuseppe Giacosa (in four acts – premiered at the Teatro Regio, 1 February 1896)
- Tosca, libretto by Luigi Illica and Giuseppe Giacosa (in three acts – premiered at the Teatro Costanzi, 14 January 1900)
- Madama Butterfly, libretto by Luigi Illica and Giuseppe Giacosa (in two acts – premiered at La Scala, 17 February 1904)
- La fanciulla del West, libretto by Guelfo Civinini and Carlo Zangarini (in three acts – premiered at the Metropolitan Opera, 10 December 1910)
- La rondine, libretto by Giuseppe Adami (in three acts – premiered at the Opéra de Monte-Carlo, 27 March 1917)
- Il trittico (premiered at the Metropolitan Opera, 14 December 1918)
  - Il tabarro, libretto by Giuseppe Adami
  - Suor Angelica, libretto by Giovacchino Forzano
  - Gianni Schicchi, libretto by Giovacchino Forzano
- Turandot, libretto by Renato Simoni and Giuseppe Adami (in three acts – incomplete at the time of Puccini's death, completed by Franco Alfano: premiered at La Scala, 25 April 1926)
