= Ferdinando Fontana =

Italian librettist and writer (1850–1919)

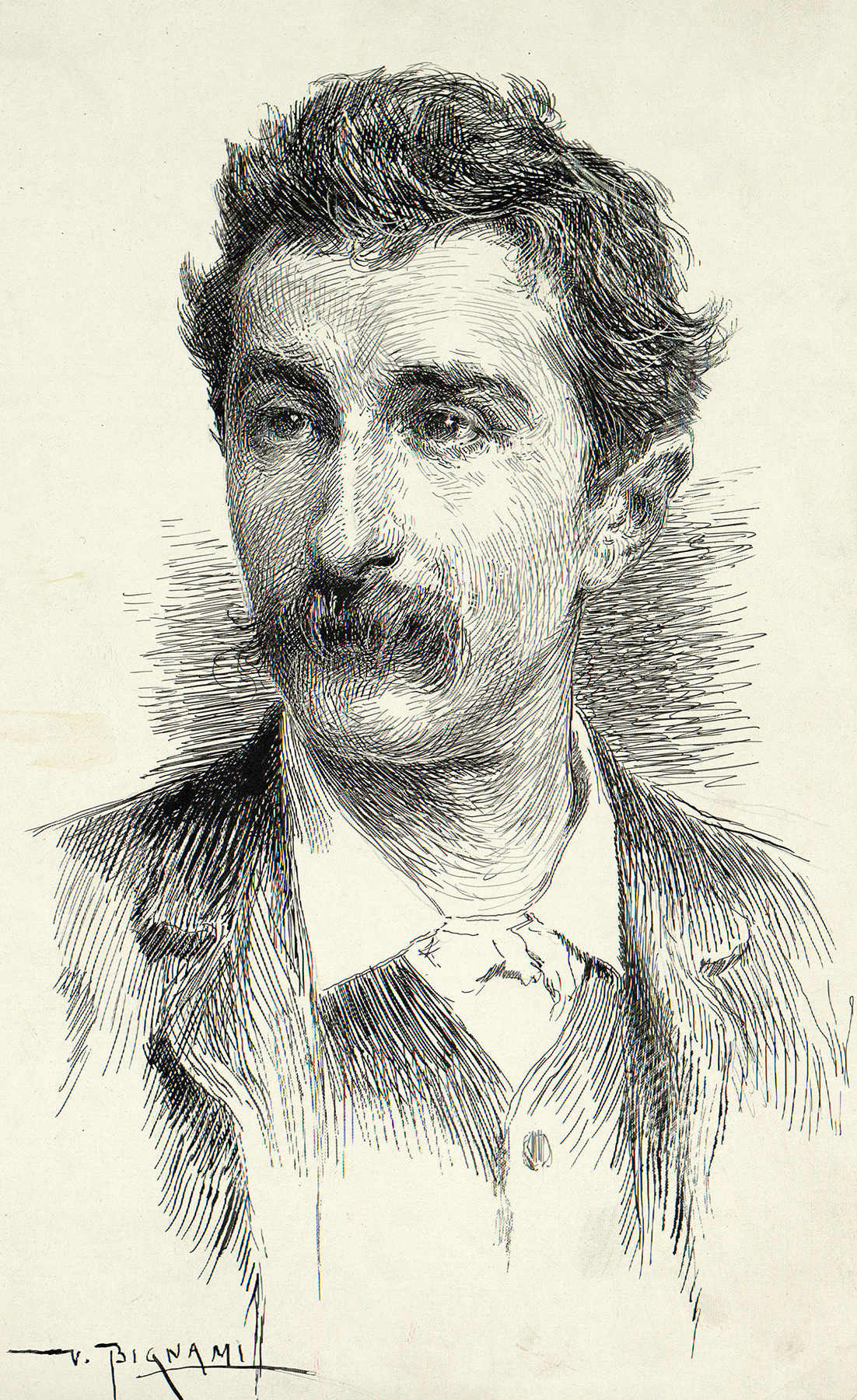
Portrait of Ferdinando Fontana by Vespasiano Bignami

Ferdinando Fontana (30 January 1850 – 10 May 1919) was an Italian journalist, dramatist, and poet. He is best known today for having written the libretti of the first two operas by Giacomo Puccini – Le Villi and Edgar.

== Biography ==
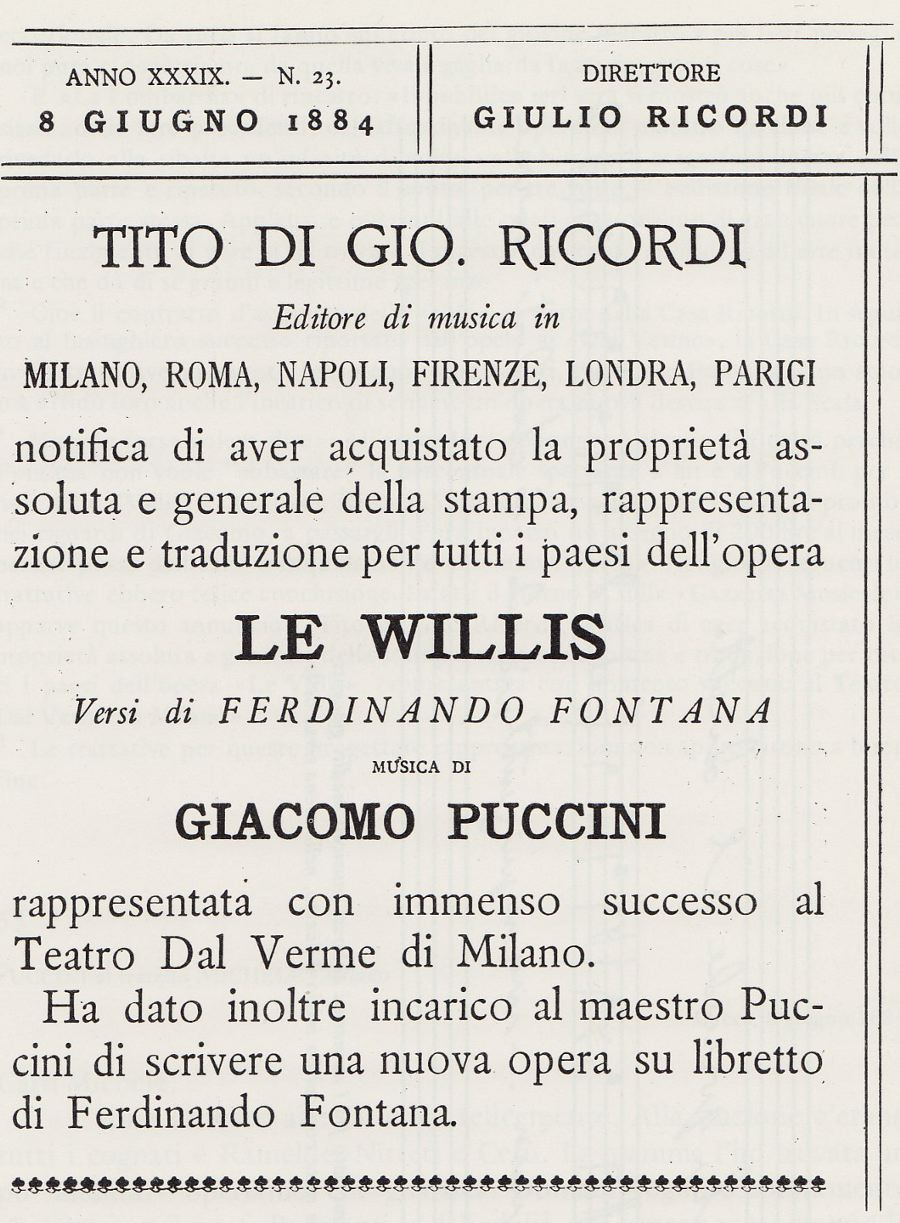
Notice in Gazzetta Musicale di Milano (1884) announcing Ricordi's publication of Le Villi and their contract with Puccini to write a second opera with Fontana.

Born in Milan, then part of the Austrian Empire, into a family of artists - both his father Carlo and his brother Roberto were painters - he entered a Barnabite school at the age of seven and then went on to study at the Collegio Zambelli. He was forced to abandon his studies while still young to provide for himself and his two younger sisters following the death of their mother. During that period, he worked in a series of menial jobs before becoming a copy editor for the newspaper Corriere di Milano. This brought him into contact with the world of journalism and literature, which was to become his career.

An exponent of the second Scapigliatura artistic movement, Fontana was a very versatile writer. Apart from his plays and opera libretti, he wrote poems (in both Italian and Milanese dialect), travel books, and articles in various Italian newspapers, including the Milanese daily Corriere della Sera. From 1878 to 1879 he was the Berlin correspondent for the Gazzetta Piemontese (today La Stampa) in Turin.

In 1881–1882, Fontana with his colleague Dario Papa (it), an influential editor of the Corriere della Sera, made a journey through the United States from New York to San Francisco. In New York he befriended Adolfo Rossi, the editor-in-chief of the Italian language newspaper Il Progresso Italo-Americano and contributed to the recently established daily.

As a journalist, he wrote such books as Un briciolo di mezzaluna (A Fragment of the Crescent); Montecarlo; Tra gli Arabi (Among the Arabs); New-York (1884, jointly with Dario Papa); and a collection of Viaggi (Travels) in two volumes, published in Milan in 1893.

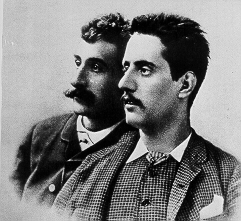
Ferdinando Fontana (left) with Giacomo Puccini.

During his time in Milan, Fontana wrote two plays in Milanese dialect, La Pina Madamin and La Statôa del sciôr Incioda. Both had considerable success and starred Edoardo Ferravilla, considered one of the greatest comic actors in Milanese theatre. He wrote numerous libretti, including two for Alberto Franchetti (Asrael and Zoroastro) and two for Puccini (Le Villi and Edgar). He wrote the libretto for Edgar in Caprino Bergamasco, where fellow librettist Antonio Ghislanzoni ran a hotel for artists.

He also translated several operetta libretti for performance in Italy, including Franz Lehár's Die lustige Witwe (The Merry Widow) and Der Graf von Luxemburg (The Count of Luxembourg), Oskar Nedbal's Polenblut (Polish Blood), and Edmund Eysler's Der Frauenfresser (The Woman-Eater). Early in his career, Fontana's output was prodigious: an 1886 article in La Stampa said that at the time, 13 new libretti by Fontana were being composed by 12 different composers.

A committed and passionate socialist, he took part in the Milanese demonstrations in 1898 which led to the Bava-Beccaris massacre. Because of the repressions which followed, he fled to Switzerland where he first lived in Montagnola, a small town near Lugano. He remained in Switzerland until his death, living a modest life, and greatly reducing his literary activities.

Fontana died in Lugano in 1919, at the age of 69.

== Texts set to music ==
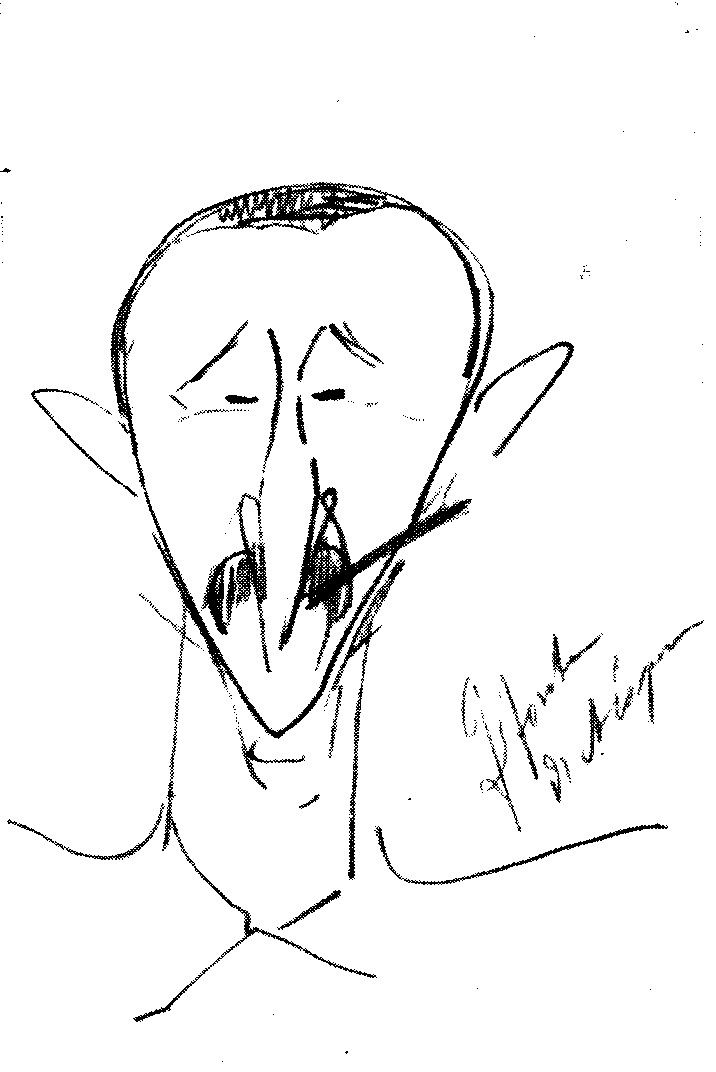
Caricature of Fontana by the Italian composer, Antonio Cagnoni (1828-1896)

Unless indicated otherwise, the texts were opera libretti.

- El marchionn di gamb avert, from the poem Lament del Marchionn di gamb avert by Carlo Porta, set to music by Enrico Bernardi (Milan, 14 July 1875)
- Il conte di Montecristo, completion of a libretto by Emilio Praga, music by Raffaele Dell'Aquila (Milan, 14 June 1876)
- Maria e Taide, music by Nicolò Massa (August 1876)
- Il violino del diavolo, music by Agostino Mercuri (Cagli, 12 September 1878)
- Aldo e Clarenza, music by Nicolò Massa (11 Aprile 1878)
- La Simona, music by Benedetto Junck (Milan, 1978)
- Odio, from Victorien Sardou's play La Haine (Hatred), for Amilcare Ponchielli but never composed (written between 1878 and 1879)
- Maria Tudor (attributed to Emilio Praga, completed after his death by Arrigo Boito, Angelo Zanardini, and Fontana) music by Antônio Carlos Gomes (Milan, 27 March 1879)
- Il bandito, music by Emilio Ferrari (Casale Monferrato, 5 December 1880)
- La leggenda d'un rosajo, cantata, music by Enrico Bertini (1883)
- Anna e Gualberto, music by Luigi Mapelli (Milan, May 1884)
- Le Villi, music by Giacomo Puccini (Milan, 31 May 1884)
- Il Natale, stories set to music by Giulio Ricordi under the pseudonym of Jules Burgmein (1884)
- Il Valdese, music by Giuseppe Ippolito Franchi-Verney (Turin, 3 December 1885)
- Flora mirabilis, music by Spiro Samara (Milan, 16 May 1886)
- Il bacio, music by Enrico Bertini, never performed (written 1886)
- Il profeta del Korasan (or Mocanna), music by Guglielmo Zuelli, never performed (written 1886)
- Notte d'aprile, music by Emilio Ferrari (Milan, 4 February 1887)
- Colomba, music by Vittorio Radeglia (Milan, 15 June 1887)
- Annibale, ballo, music by Romualdo Marenco (1888)
- Asrael, music by Alberto Franchetti (Reggio Emilia, 11 February 1888)
- Edgar, music by Giacomo Puccini (Milan, 21 April 1889)
- Zoroastro, music by Alberto Franchetti, never performed (written 1890)
- Il tempo, dance, music by Riccardo Bonicioli (3 January 1891)
- Lionella, music by Spiro Samara (Milan, 4 April 1891)
- Theora, music by Ettore Edoardo Trucco (14 February 1894)
- Duettin d'amore, written with Gaetano Sbodio, music by Emilio Ferrari, (1895)
- La forza d'amore, music by Arturo Buzzi-Peccia (Turin, 6 March 1897)
- Il signor di Pourceaugnac, based on Molière's play Monsieur de Pourceaugnac, music by Alberto Franchetti (Milan, 10 April 1897)
- Mal d'amore, based on Paolo Ferrari's La medicina d'una ragazza malata, music by Angelo Mascheroni (Milan, 30 April 1898)
- La lampada, music by Ubaldo Pacchierotti (16 December 1899)
- La dea della montagna, ovvero I minatori, music by Ivan Zajc (composition completed 31 January 1899; unperformed)
- La notte di Natale, music by Alberto Gentile (29 December 1900)
- Il calvario, music by Edoardo Bellini (Milan, 25 June 1901)
- La nereide, music by Ulisse Trovati (14 November 1911)
- Sandha, music by Felice Lattuada (Genoa, 21 February 1924)
- Maria Petrovna, music by João Gomes de Araújo (composed in 1903 but not performed until January 1929)
- Elda (written in Switzerland)
- La Simona, lyric poem based on the Seventh Tale of the Fourth Day in Boccaccio's Decameron, music by Benedetto Junck (date unknown)
- Inno del Canton Ticino (Anthem of Canton Ticino) as well as songs and romanzas set to music by various composers, including Nicolò Massa and Francesco Paolo Tosti. Fontana supplied the poems for three songs by Tosti – "Senza di te!", "È morto Pulcinella!", and "Nonna,... sorridi?...".

== Notes and references ==
This article is a substantial translation from Ferdinando Fontana in the Italian Wikipedia. With the exception of Sanvitale (2004) and Durante (2014), the source texts listed below are from the original article.

- Cesari, Francesco, Ferdinando Fontana librettista, in Scapigliatura & Fin de Siècle. Libretti d'opera italiani dall'Unità al primo Novecento - Scritti per Mario Morini, edited by Johannes Streicher, Sonia Teramo e Roberta Travaglini, Ismez, Rome 2007, pp. 325–344 - ISBN 88-89675-02-0
- Durante, Francesco, ed. (2014). Italoamericana: The Literature of the Great Migration, 1880-1943. New York: Fordham University Press. ISBN 978-0-8232-6062-1.
- Gallini, Natale, Incontro con Ferdinando Fontana in La Martinella di Milano IX (1955), pp. 11–12
- Istituto di Studi Pucciniani, Lettere di Ferdinando Fontana a Giacomo Puccini: 1884-1919, in Quaderni Puccininani 4 - 1992.
- Longoni, Biancamaria, Vita e opere di Ferdinando Fontana, in Quaderni Puccininani 4 - 1992, Istituto di Studi Pucciniani.
- Sanvitale, Francesco The Song of a Life: Francesco Paolo Tosti (1846-1916) (translated by Nicola Hawthorne), Ashgate Publishing Ltd., 2004. ISBN 0-7546-3927-4
