= Edgar (opera) =

1889 opera by Giacomo Puccini

- Opera by Giacomo Puccini
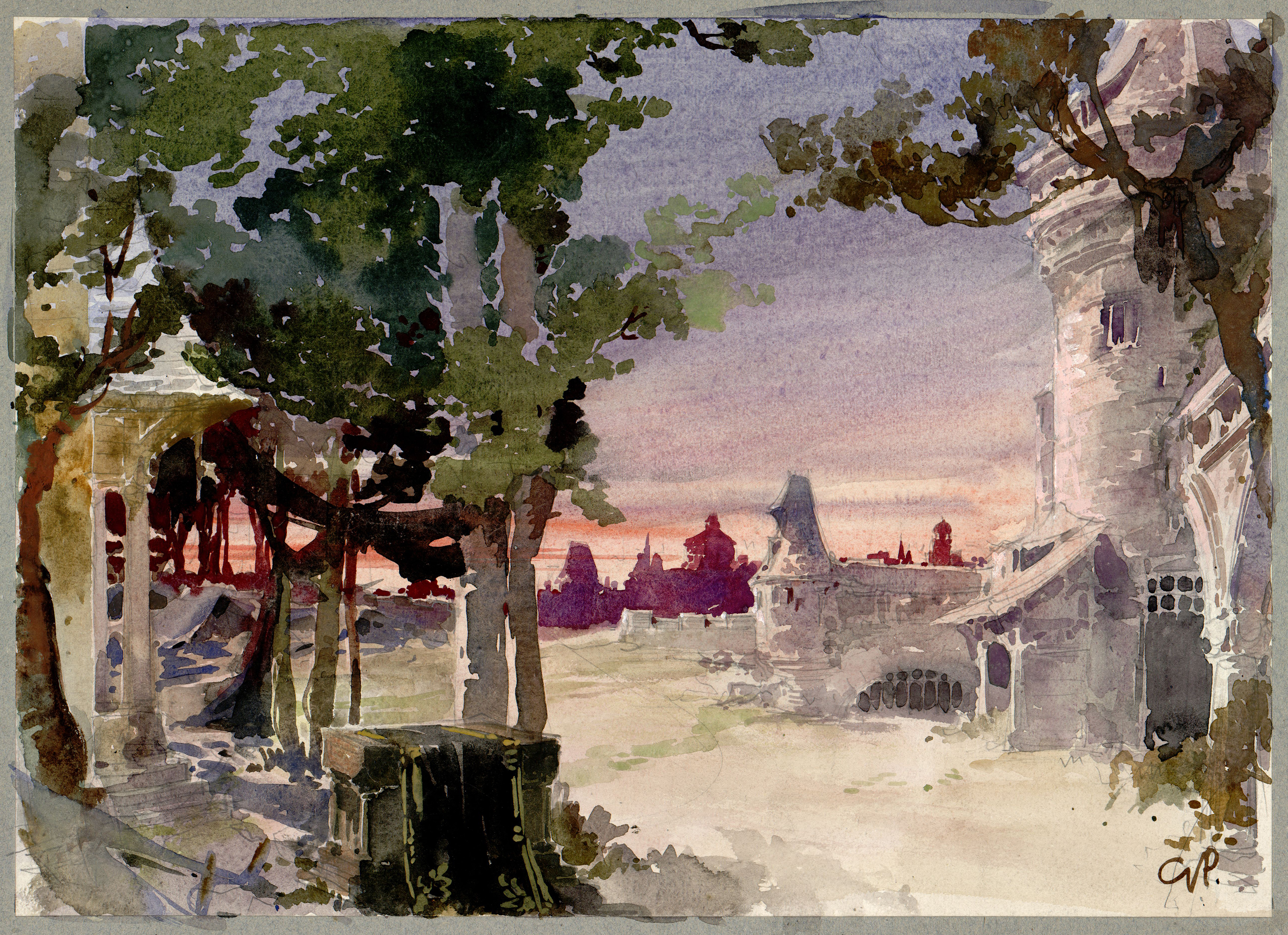
- Set design by Giuseppe Palanti for Act III
- Librettist: Ferdinando Fontana
- Language: Italian
- Based on: Alfred de Musset's play La Coupe et les lèvres
- Premiere: 21 April 1889; Teatro alla Scala, Milan

Edgar is an operatic dramma lirico in three acts (originally four) by Giacomo Puccini to an Italian libretto by Ferdinando Fontana, freely based on the play in verse La Coupe et les lèvres by Alfred de Musset.

The first performance was given at the Teatro alla Scala in Milan on 21 April 1889 but the opera was not a success. Puccini repeatedly revised it until a 1905 performance in Buenos Aires, before declaring the work irredeemable, describing it as "warmed-up soup". It is still occasionally performed, including a 2005 recording by the Orchestra dell'Accademia Nazionale di Santa Cecilia conducted by Alberto Veronesi and featuring Plácido Domingo. This recording was described by Gramophone as "a tasty meal".

== Development and revisions ==
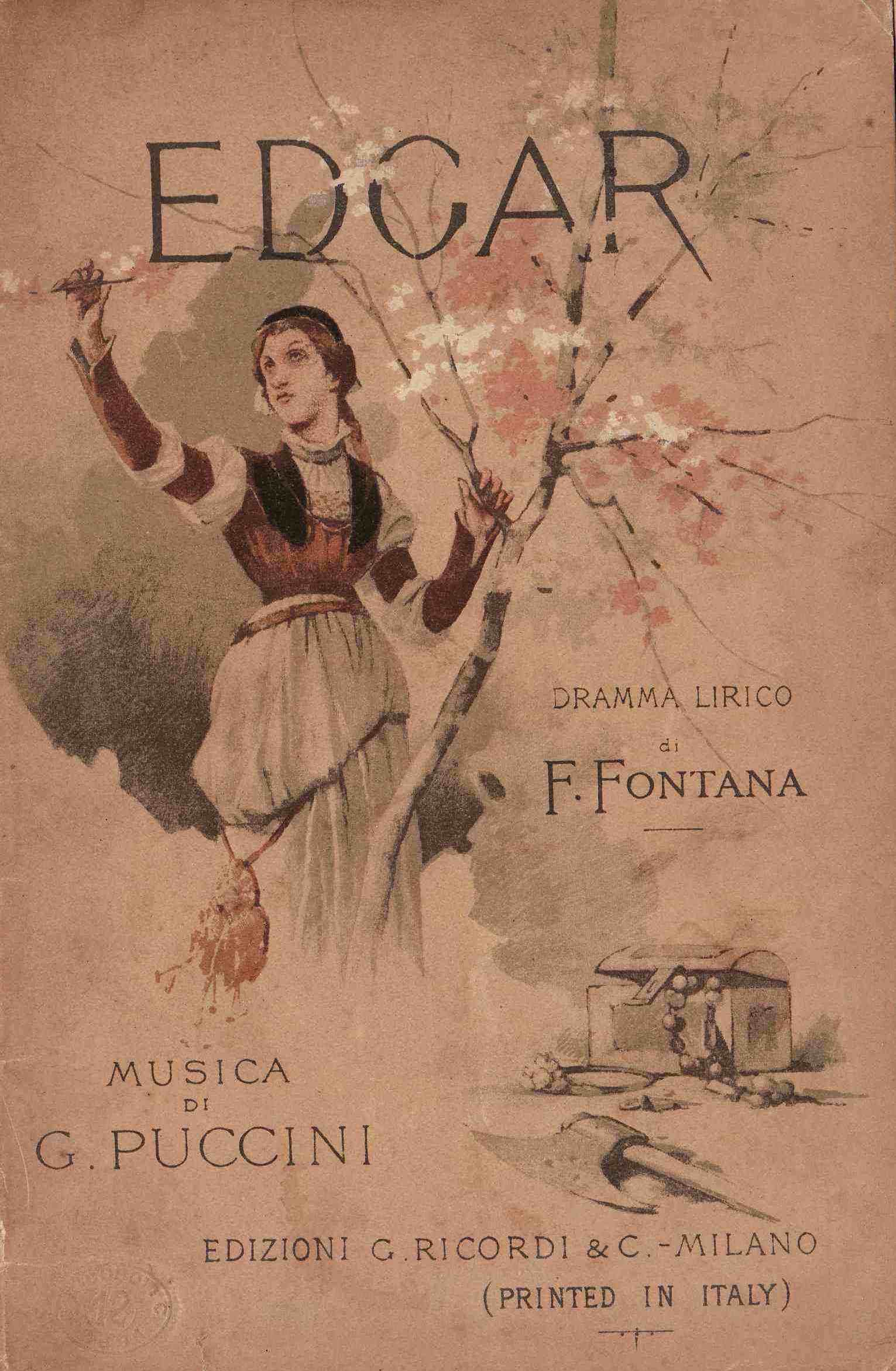
Cover of the libretto

Edgar, Puccini's second opera, was composed on a commission from the publisher Ricordi after the successful reception of his first stage work, Le Villi. The plot indicates the influence of Wagner's Tannhäuser. Both centre on medieval knights struggling between a life of sensual indulgence and ideal love. Edgar is "torn between the sacred love of Fidelia and the profane love of Tigrana"; Wagner's hero indulges himself with Venus while pining for the love of Elizabeth. The gypsy-like figure of Tigrana (supposedly the child of "wandering Moors") also parallels the anti-heroine of Bizet's Carmen.

The original version had four acts and was tepidly received. In January 1890, Ricordi published a revised version, including a different ending for act 2. In the autumn of 1891, Puccini revised the work again, cutting the last act and producing a three-act version which would again be revised in 1905.

In this final form the opera had even less success than in its original four-act structure. Some of the music that was cut in 1891 was reused in Tosca and became the act 3 duet, "Amaro sol per te m'era il morire!". The funeral march from act 3 was played at Puccini's funeral, conducted by Arturo Toscanini and the aria "Addio, mio dolce amor" ("Farewell, My Sweet Love") from the same act was sung.

Puccini finally gave up on Edgar and in later years, bitterly repudiated the work. He wrote

It was an organism defective from the dramatic point of view. Its success was ephemeral. Although I knew that I wrote some pages which do me credit, that is not enough—as an opera it does not exist. The basis of an opera is the subject and its treatment. In setting the libretto of Edgar I have, with all respect to the memory of my friend Fontana, made a blunder (una cantonata). It was more my fault than his.

On a copy of the score that he sent to a friend, the English woman Sybil Seligman, he wrote scathing remarks against parts of the score and amended the title to read:

E Dio ti GuARdi da quest'opera! (And may God protect you from this opera!)

The autograph of Acts 1 and 3 of the original version is preserved in the Archivio Ricordi in Milan.

== Performance history ==
The first version was performed at the Teatro Regio in Turin on 25 June 2008, directed by Yoram David. American musicologist Dr. Linda Fairtile is working on producing the critical edition of the first version, but the score performed in Turin is based on Puccini's autograph. Fairtile worked on it together with Gabriele Dotto and Claudio Toscani.

In the opera's 1905 version, it was first given in the US on 12 April 1966 and in the UK on 6 April 1967 (by Hammersmith Municipal Opera under Joseph Vandernoot).

This original four-act 1889 version was believed lost for over a century when Puccini's granddaughter Simonetta discovered the score fully intact in 2008. The first performance of this original score since the nineteenth century was undertaken by director Tiziano Mancini with the orchestra and chorus of Teatro Regio di Torino under the baton of Yoram David, and Argentine tenor José Cura as Edgar.

The original version was given its UK premiere at Lewes Town Hall by New Sussex Opera on 25 October 2012.

The Berliner Operngruppe under Felix Krieger presented Edgar at Konzerthaus Berlin in February 2019.

== Roles ==
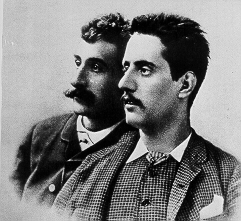
Librettist Ferdinando Fontana and composer Giacomo Puccini

Role	Voice type	Premiere cast, 21 April 1889 (Conductor: Franco Faccio)
Edgar	tenor	Grigore Gabrielescu
Fidelia	soprano	Aurelia Cattaneo
Tigrana	mezzo-soprano	Romilda Pantaleoni
Frank	baritone	Antonio Magini-Coletti
Gualtiero, father of Fidelia and Frank	bass	Pio Marini
Chorus: Farmers, soldiers, courtiers, monks, children

== Synopsis (three-act version) ==
Place: Flanders.
Time: 1302.

=== Act 1 ===
Pure-hearted maiden Fidelia rejoices in the return of Edgar, who has been living a life of debauchery with the wild Tigrana, a woman who was abandoned by "wandering Moors" as a baby and brought up by Fidelia's father. Fidelia gives an awakening Edgar a sprig of almond blossoms, but leaves when she sees Tigrana approaching. Tigrana tries to tempt Edgar to return to their life of debauchery, but fails when Edgar avows he loves Fidelia's purity. Frank, who has always loved Tigrana, enters, but when he cannot win her affections, he berates her, and they argue.

After Tigrana mocks the villagers at prayer, they order her to leave the village. She retreats to Edgar's house, where he defends her from the angry crowd. He announces that he will go with her, and burns down his house before leaving. Frank attempts to stop them, and is wounded in a duel with Edgar. The villagers curse the fleeing lovers.

=== Act 2 ===
Edgar has left the wild orgy in Tigrana's house. He is tired of his life of debauchery and longs to return to Fidelia. Tigrana comes to him to entice him back to the party, but, just as she is about to succeed, a platoon of soldiers arrives. Edgar is surprised that Frank is leading them, and asks for forgiveness. Frank grants it happily because the fight actually had broken the hold Tigrana had on him. To escape from Tigrana, Edgar joins the platoon, despite her pleading. Tigrana swears revenge as the men leave her.

=== Act 3 ===
A large funeral procession carries the armored body of Edgar, who has fallen in battle. Frank and the crowd praise Edgar as a hero, but the monk who heard Edgar's dying confession denounces him. He reveals Edgar's sins and debauchery, and the crowd, easily swayed, curses Edgar. Only Fidelia stands up for Edgar and vows that she will meet him in heaven.

After the crowd leaves, Tigrana enters, crying. She is upset that no one will see her weeping for Edgar. Frank and the monk ask her to denounce Edgar, but she resists until they offer her jewels. The crowd returns. The monk claims that Edgar betrayed his country for some gold, and Tigrana reluctantly confirms this. The soldiers try to desecrate the body and discover it is only a suit of armor. The monk reveals that he is Edgar and goes to leave with Fidelia, the only one who remained true to him. The vengeful Tigrana stabs and kills Fidelia. Edgar weeps over the lifeless body as the soldiers capture Tigrana, and the crowd prays.

== Noted arias ==
Act 1

- "O fior del giorno" – Fidelia
- "Già il mandorlo vicino" – Fidelia
- "Questo amor, vergogna mia" – Frank
- "Tu il cuor mi strazi" – Tigrana

Act 2

- "Orgia, chimera dall'occhio vitreo" – Edgar

Act 3

- "Addio, mio dolce amor" – Fidelia
- "Nel villaggio d'Edgar" – Fidelia
- "Ah! se scuoter della morte" – Tigrana (4 acts versions)

Act 4

- "Un'ora almen" – Fidelia

== Recordings ==
Year	Cast (Edgar, Fidelia, Tigrana, Frank)	Conductor, Opera house and orchestra	Label
1977	Carlo Bergonzi, Renata Scotto, Gwendolyn Killebrew, Vicente Sardinero	Eve Queler, Opera Orchestra of New York, Schola Cantorum of New York (Live recording from Carnegie Hall, April 1977)	CD: CBS/Sony Classical; Cat: M2K 79213
2006	Plácido Domingo, Adriana Damato, Marianne Cornetti, Juan Pons	Alberto Veronesi, Orchestra dell'Accademia Nazionale di Santa Cecilia	CD: Deutsche Grammophon; Cat: 00289 477 6102
2008	José Cura, Amarilli Nizza, Julia Gertseva, Marco Vratogna	Yoram David, Orchestra and chorus of Teatro Regio di Torino	DVD: Arthaus Musik; Cat: 101 377
