= Le Villi =

Opera by Giacomo Puccini

- Opera–ballet by Giacomo Puccini
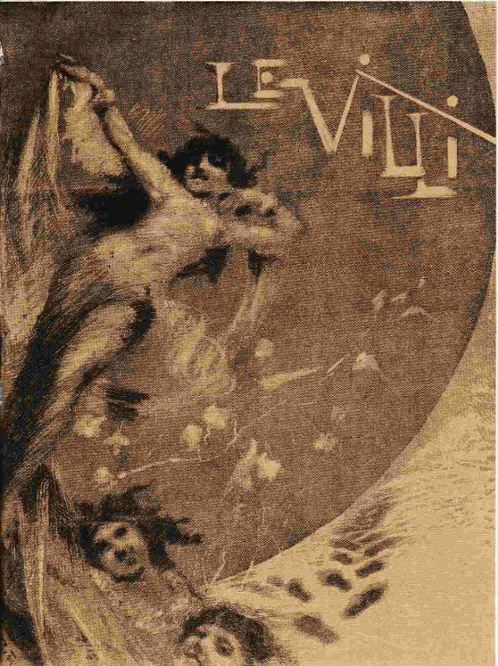
- Original 1884 advertisement in Gazzetta Musicale di Milano
- Librettist: Ferdinando Fontana
- Language: Italian
- Based on: Jean-Baptiste Alphonse Karr's short story "Les Willis"
- Premiere: 31 May 1884; Teatro Dal Verme, Milan

Le Villi (The Willis or The Fairies) is an opera–ballet in two acts (originally one) composed by Giacomo Puccini to an Italian libretto by Ferdinando Fontana, based on the short story "Les Willis" by Jean-Baptiste Alphonse Karr. Karr's story was in turn based in the Central European legend of the Vila, also used in the ballet Giselle. The opera, in its original one-act version, premiered at Milan's Teatro Dal Verme, on 31 May 1884. (Note: Playing in the contrabass section of the orchestra that night was the 21-year-old Pietro Mascagni.)

A performance typically lasts 64 minutes.

== Compositional history ==
Le Villi is Puccini's first stage work. It was written for Casa Musicale Sonzogno's first of four musical competitions, advertised in April 1883, for a new, unperformed opera "inspired by the best traditions of Italian opera", which could be "idyllic, serious, or comic", to be judged by a panel including Amintore Galli and Amilcare Ponchielli. Puccini's submission was disqualified because its manuscript was illegible.

Puccini's supporters, who included Arrigo Boito, funded the first production, whose favorable reception led to publication by Giulio Ricordi. Puccini's mother received the following telegram on the night of premiere at the Teatro dal Verme on 31 May 1884: "Theatre packed, immense success; anticipations exceeded; eighteen calls; finale of first act encored thrice"'. Ricordi urged the composer to expand the work, and Puccini did, producing a new version later that year, which was followed by modifications in 1885, and the final version in 1889.

== Performance history ==
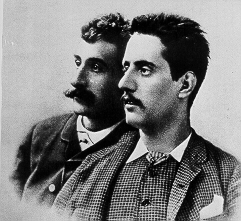
Librettist Ferdinando Fontana and composer Giacomo Puccini

In the libretto, each part of the symphonic intermezzo between acts 1 and 2 – L'Abbandono (The Desertion) and La tregenda (The Spectre) – is preceded by explanatory verses recounting the intervening events. Michele Girardi, citing a letter from Fontana to Puccini on 3 September 1884, has pointed out that the librettist intended for these to be read by the audience but not actually recited by a narrator. But according to Mosco Carner, Puccini had intended for the verses to be read out to the audience, although he notes there is no mention of this having actually happened in contemporary reviews of the first production. Likewise, there is no record of a narrator having been used at the first performance of Le Villi at the Metropolitan Opera in 1908. Nevertheless, a narrator is used in some modern productions of the opera, such as the September 2004 production at the Teatro Dal Verme with Leo Nucci as the narrator, and the August 1994 production at the Festival della Valle d'Itria in Martina Franca with Massimo Foschi as narrator. A narrator (Tito Gobbi) is also used in the Sony 1981 studio recording of the work.

A revised, two-act version was performed at the Teatro Regio, Turin, on 26 December 1884. Le Villi was also performed at the Teatro San Carlo in Naples on 15 January 1888. However, on that occasion it was not viewed favourably by either the audience or the critics who characterized it as "simply an imitation of Wagner". Puccini continued to revise the work up until its Hamburg premiere in 1892, conducted by Gustav Mahler.

The UK premiere, by the Carl Rosa Opera Company occurred on 24 September 1897 at the Comedy Theatre in Manchester, and the US premiere came on 17 December 1908 at the New York Metropolitan Opera conducted by Arturo Toscanini. Performed as a double bill with Mascagni's Cavalleria rusticana, the Met's production featured Frances Alda as Anna and Alessandro Bonci as Roberto. The work did not receive its premiere at the Vienna State Opera until 23 October 2005, when it was performed in a double bill with Leoš Janáček's Osud. Simone Young conducted the performance with Krassimira Stoyanova as Anna and José Cura as Roberto.

The UK premiere of the original version, and the first performance anywhere since the first performance on 31 May 1884, took place in London's Royal Festival Hall on 21 November 2018. It was given by the London Philharmonic Orchestra under Sir Mark Elder. The soloists were Ermonela Jaho, Brian Mulligan and Arsen Soghomonyan with the Opera Rara Chorus.

== Roles ==
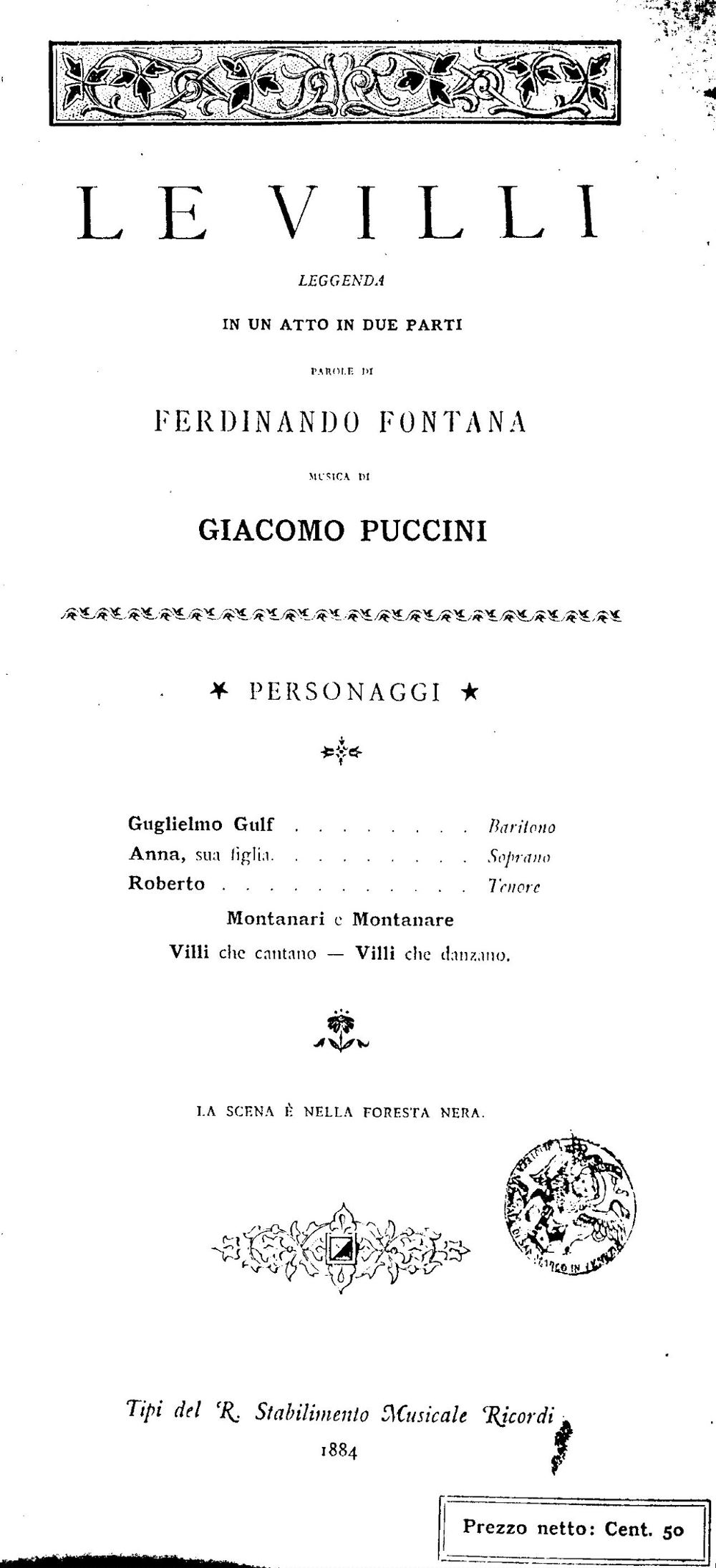
Front cover of the first printed libretto

Roles, voice types, premiere casts
Role	Voice type	Premiere cast			
Role	Voice type	Premiere, Milan, Teatro Dal Verme, 31 May 1884 Conductor: (Note: Sources disagree on this. Achille, Arturo, Alfredo and Giacomo Panizza have all been quoted as the conductor. As has Ettore Panizza, but he was only 9 years old at the time.)	Second version, Turin, Teatro Regio, 26 December 1884 Conductor: Giovanni Bolzoni	Third version, Milan, Teatro alla Scala, 24 January 1885 Conductor: Franco Faccio	Fourth version, Milan, Teatro Dal Verme, 7 November 1889 Conductor: Alessandro Pomè
Guglielmo, the head forester	baritone or bass	Erminio Peltz	Agostino Gnaccarini	Delfino Menotti	Mario Sammarco
Anna, his daughter	soprano	Rosina Caponetti	Elena Boronat	Romilda Pantaleoni	Elena Thériane
Roberto, a young man	tenor	António D'Andrade	Enrico Filippi-Bresciani	Andrea Anton	Michele Mariacher
Mountain folk, fairies, unseen spirits

== Synopsis ==
Place: The Black Forest
Time: Indeterminate

=== Act 1 ===
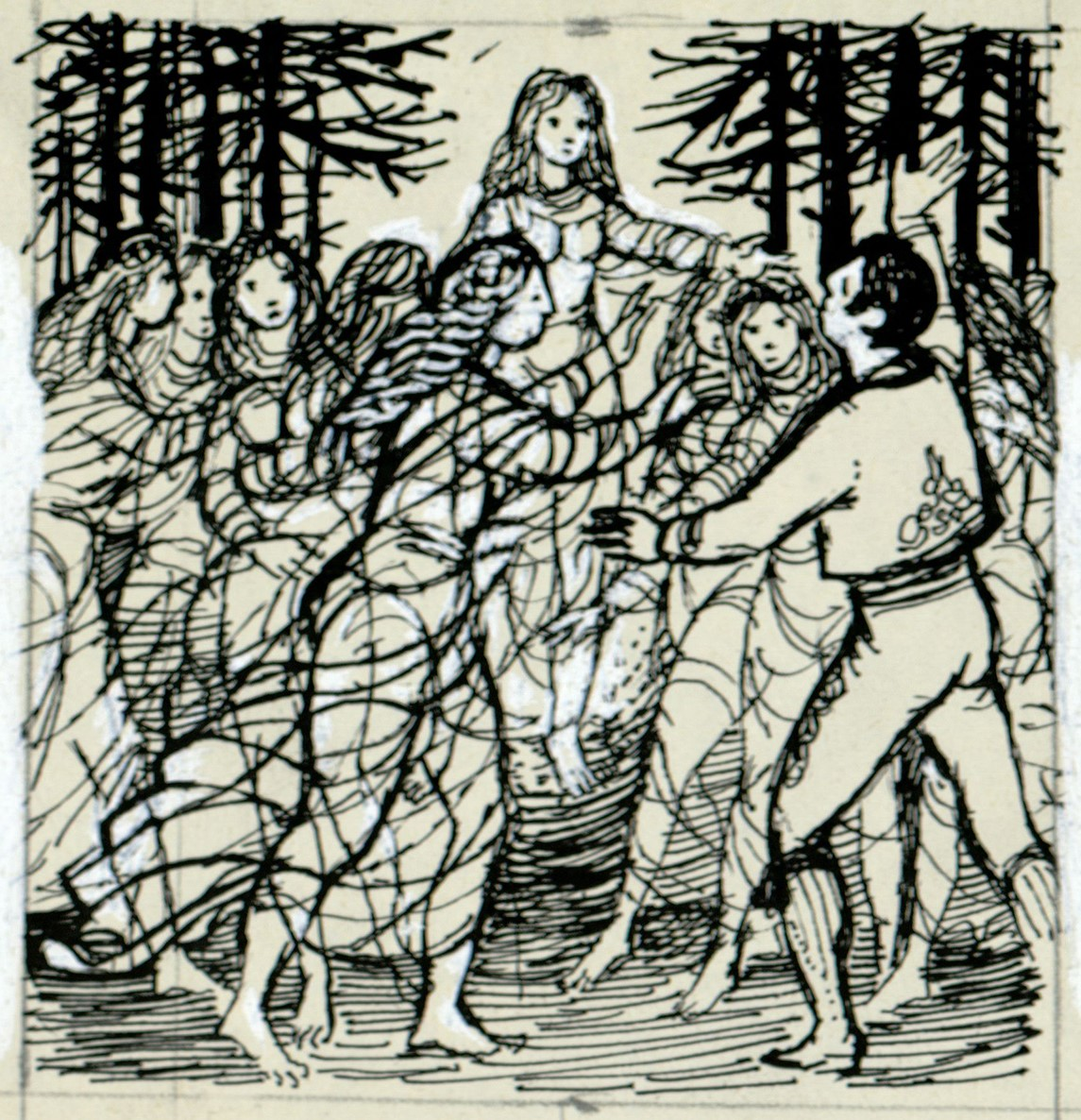
Drawing for Le Villi by Peter Hoffer (1962)

Spring

Family and guests dance at a celebration of the engagement in marriage of Roberto and Anna. Roberto must leave before the ceremony to collect an inheritance, and Anna worries that she will never see him again (Aria: Se come voi piccina). Roberto comforts Anna telling her that it will be fine and they will marry when he returns from Mainz. Anna tells Roberto of her dreams of him dying but Roberto tells Anna that she should not worry about his love failing and that she may doubt her God but not his love for her. The crowd returns and Anna is still worried about Roberto leaving. Roberto then asks Guglielmo, Anna's father, to bless them before his journey and Roberto sets off for Mainz.

=== Intermezzo ===
Roberto is enchanted by a siren, and forgets Anna. Anna waits through the summer and the autumn and in the winter dies in his absence. The legend of the fairies (Le Villi) is then explained. When a woman dies of a broken heart, the fairies force the heart breaker to dance until death.

=== Act 2 ===
Winter

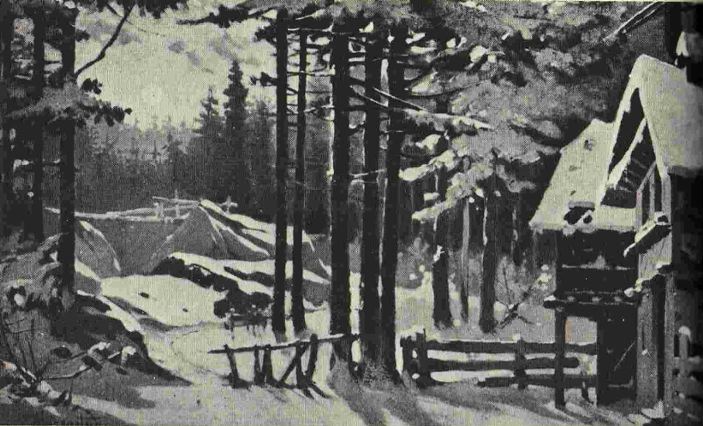
Water-colour sketch by Adolf Hohenstein for the setting of act 2

Anna's father, Guglielmo, holds Roberto responsible for Anna's death and calls upon the Villi to take vengeance on Roberto (Aria: Anima santa della figlia mia). The Villi call upon the ghost of Anna and lure Roberto into the forest. Roberto, now penniless and abandoned by the seductress, returns when news of Anna's death reaches him. He hopes for forgiveness, but the Villi stalk him as he mourns the loss of the days of his youth (Aria: Torna ai felici dì). Roberto then finds the one last flower left alive in the winter and tries to find hope that Anna lives but is repelled by the Villi when he tries to knock on the door of Guglielmo's house. Roberto then tries to pray for forgiveness but finds he cannot because of the curse put upon him by the Villi. As Roberto curses his fate Anna appears to him and tells him of the suffering that she had to endure. Roberto begs for forgiveness and he too feels the pain of Anna burning in his heart. But Roberto is not forgiven and Anna calls upon the Villi, who curse Roberto with cries of "traitor." There, the Villi and Anna dance with Roberto until he dies of exhaustion at Anna's feet.

== Recordings ==
Year	Cast (Roberto, Anna, Guglielmo)	Conductor, opera house and orchestra	Label
1954	Gianni Dal Ferro, Elisabetta Fusco, Silvano Verlinghieri	Arturo Basile, RAI Turin Chorus and Orchestra	CD: Cetra Records (Warner Fonit Cetra)
1971	Barry Morell, Adriana Maliponte, Matteo Manuguerra	Anton Guadagno, Vienna Volksoper Orchestra, Vienna Academy Chamber Choir	Audio LP: RCA Records; Cat: LSC 7096
1979	David Parker, Marilyn Richardson, James Christiansen	Myer Fredman, Adelaide Symphony Orchestra, Adelaide Festival Chorale	CD: Chandos; Cat: ABT 1019
1979	Plácido Domingo, Renata Scotto, Leo Nucci; Narrator: Tito Gobbi	Lorin Maazel, National Philharmonic Orchestra, Ambrosian Opera Chorus	CD: Sony Classical; Cat: MT 76890
2004	Albert Montserrat, Andrea Rola, Halla Margret	Tamás Pál, Orchestra and Chorus Filarmonica Mediterranea, (Video recording of a performance in the Grandi Terme di Villa Adriana, Roma as part of the Festival Euro Mediterraneo, 31 July)	DVD: Kultur; Cat: D4064
2008	Carlo Torriani, Miriam Cauchi, Antonio Stragapede	Joseph Debrincat, Orkestra Nazzjonali, The Classique Chorus, (Recorded at a concert in the Grandmaster's Palace, Valletta, Malta to mark the 150th anniversary of the birth of Giacomo Puccini. Narrator: Deborah Conti)	CD: Cameo Classics Cat: CC9040CD, DVD: Documentary presented by Dr. Simonetta Puccini with film in Italy and video excerpts from the concert
2018	Elia Fabbian Maria Teresa Leva Leonardo Caimi Tony Laudadio	Marci Angius, Orchestra e Coro del Maggio Musicale Fiorentino (Recorded at Teatro Maggio Musicale Fiorentino, October 25, 2018)	CD: Dynamic, Cat: CDS7840 DVD: 37840

== Notes and references ==
Notes

Sources

- Anon. (n.d.). "Le Villi (curiosita)" (in Italian). Comitato Nazionale Celebrazioni Pucciniane. Archived from the original on 2011-07-22.
- Anon. (n.d.b). "Le Villi" (in German). Vienna State Opera.
- Anon. (17 December 1908). "Le Villi performance record". Metropolitan Opera.
- Anon. (19 September 2004). "Le Villi di Puccini torna al Dal Verme". Corriere della Sera. Archived from the original on February 19, 2012.
- Capon, Brian (n.d.). "Recordings of Le Villi". operadis-opera-discography.org.uk.
- Carner, Mosco (1992). Puccini: A Critical Biography (3rd ed.). Duckworth. ISBN 978-0-7156-2363-3.
- Dry, Wakeling (1906). Living Masters of Music, Giacomo Puccini. London: John Lane, The Bodley Head. OCLC 890894.
- Girardi, Michele (2002). Puccini: His International Art. Translated by Laura Basini. University of Chicago Press. ISBN 0-226-29758-6.
- Holden, Amanda, ed. (2001). The New Penguin Opera Guide. New York: Penguin Putnam. ISBN 0-14-029312-4.
