= Giuseppe Giacosa =

Italian writer and librettist (1847–1906)

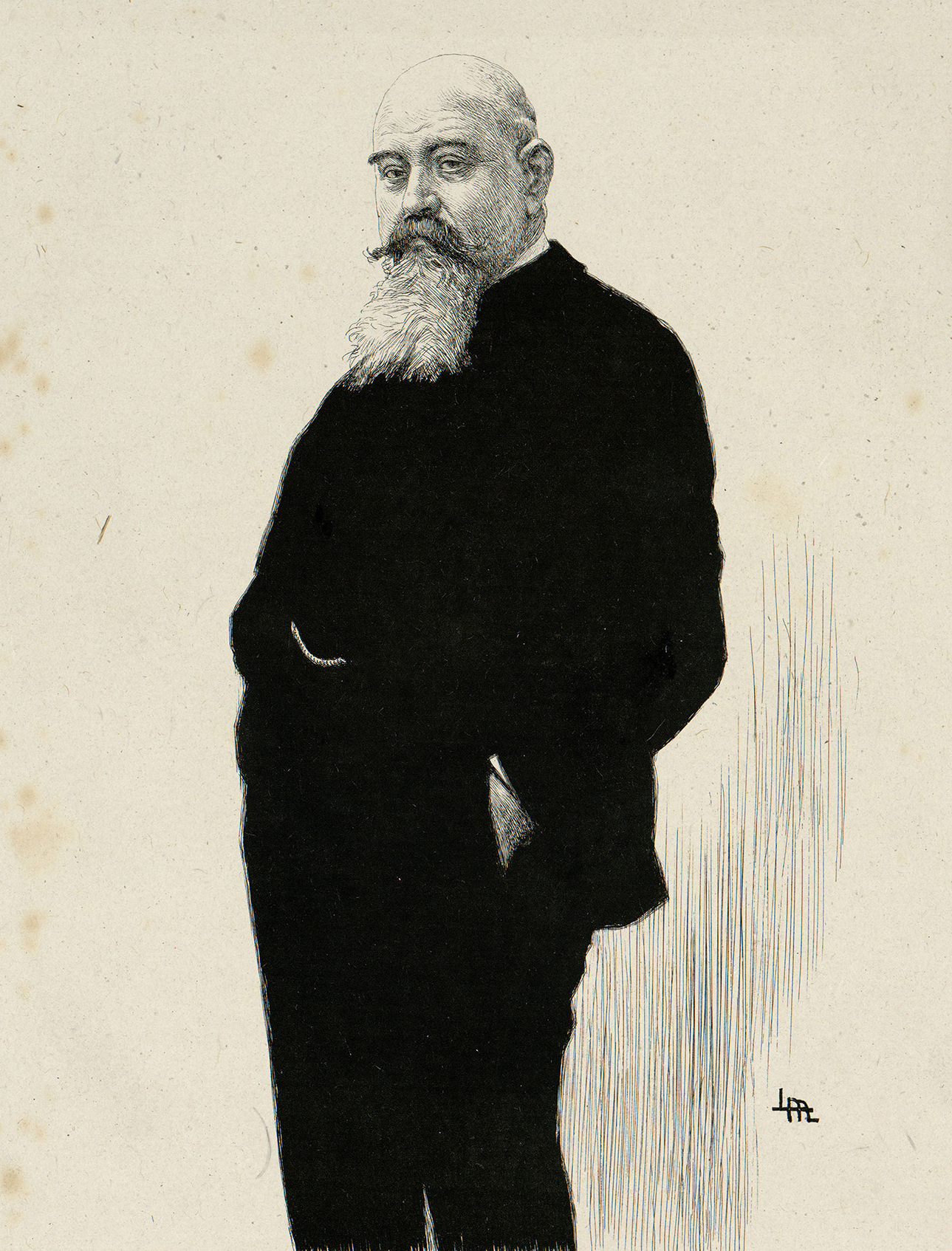
- Portrait of Giuseppe Giacosa by Leopoldo Metlicovitz
- Born: 21 October 1847; Colleretto Giacosa, Kingdom of Sardinia
- Died: 1 September 1906 (aged 58); Colleretto Giacosa, Kingdom of Italy
- Education: University of Turin
- Occupations: Poet; Intellectual
- Spouse: Maria Bertola (m. 1877)
- Children: 3
- Writing career
- Language: Italian; French
- Period: 20th century
- Genres: Drama; libretto
- Movements: Scapigliatura; Verismo

Signature
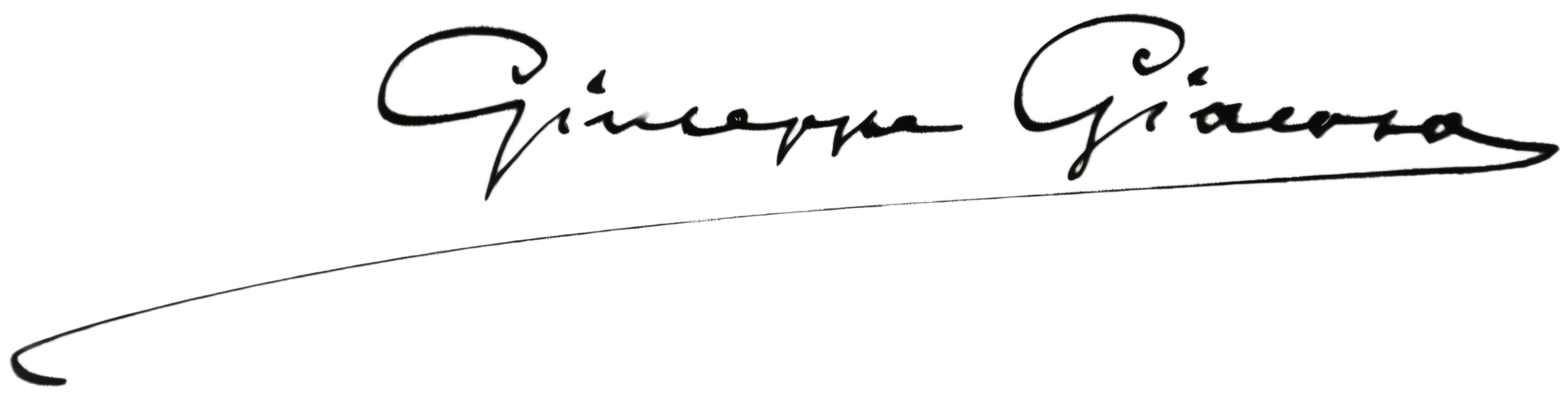

Giuseppe Giacosa (21 October 1847 – 1 September 1906) was an Italian poet, playwright and librettist. Regarded at the turn of the 20th century as one of Italy's leading playwrights, Giacosa is remembered chiefly for his association with Puccini in double harness with the librettist Luigi Illica.

== Life ==
Giuseppe Giacosa was born in Colleretto Parella, now Colleretto Giacosa, near Turin. The son of an attorney, he took a law degree from the University of Turin and practiced for a time in his father's office in Turin, but after his first theatrical successes he decided to devote the rest of his life to the stage.

He gained initial fame for his play Una Partita a Scacchi ("A Game of Chess") in 1871. His main field was playwriting, which he accomplished with both insight and simplicity, using subjects set in Piedmont and themes addressing contemporary bourgeois values.

In 1885 he was appointed professor of history and literature at the Academy of Fine Arts in Turin, but withdrew often to the town of Ivrea, near his birthplace, for periods of intense work. Brief journeys to southern Italy, Sicily, France, and Germany opened the world to him, but he preferred a slightly bourgeois family life on his native soil.

In 1888 he moved to Milan, where simultaneously he was appointed director and lecturer at the Academy of Dramatic Arts and professor of dramatic literature at the Conservatory. He had the opportunity to hear many operas at the famous opera house La Scala and became one of Arrigo Boito's closest friend. After only one year he left the Academy, and in 1892 he resigned from the Conservatory as well.

In the autumn of 1891 he accompanied Sarah Bernhardt on a tour of America with a five-act play, La Dame de Challant, which he had written for her in French. In Impressioni d'America (Milan, 1899) he gives a lively account of this journey, which took him as far as the Midwest and to Toronto. He also wrote about the history and the people of his Piedmontese homeland; and, as a passionate alpinist, he described his wanderings over the mountains of the Aosta Valley.

During the last years of his life and up to the time of his death Giacosa was director of the influential literary magazine La Lettura, published in connection with the Corriere della Sera of Milan.

== Work ==
Giacosa's work is extraordinarily wide-ranging and includes stories and an imposing series of verse dramas. A close friend of Giovanni Verga and Émile Zola, he turned toward naturalism at the beginning of the 1880s and became, next to Verga, the most important representative of verismo on the Italian stage.

In 1883, the year before her first encounter with Arrigo Boito, Eleonora Duse appeared in Florence and Rome in two premières of works by Giacosa. In the autumn of 1891 she played in the première in Turin of La Signora di Challant, his Italian version of La Dame de Challant.

Giacosa's brooding drama Tristi amori, which had been inspired by Boito, was a failure at its première in Rome in 1887 because of its stark realism. Some months later, however, Eleonora Duse brought the work to triumphant success in Turin. Today it is considered his finest work, next to Come le foglie. Come le foglie has been compared to Chekhov's Cherry Orchard, while Il più forte, Giacosa's last work (1904), is reminiscent of George Bernard Shaw's Mrs. Warren's Profession.

Giacosa wrote the final polished version of the libretto for Giacomo Puccini's Manon Lescaut, which had been begun by Ruggero Leoncavallo, Marco Praga, Domenico Oliva, and Luigi Illica. He also wrote the librettos used by Puccini for La bohème, Tosca and Madama Butterfly in conjunction with Luigi Illica. Illica supplied the plot and dialogue, and Giacosa polished the libretto into verses. In addition to his work for Puccini Giacosa adapted Una partita a scacchi for a one-act opera by the composer Pietro Abbà Cornaglia (1892) and sketched out the text for an oratorio, Cain, for Lorenzo Perosi. The plan to write a libretto for Mascagni with Illica never came to fruition.

== Legacy ==
Outside Italy, Giacosa is possibly best known today for the libretti for Puccini's La bohème (1896), Tosca (1899), and Madama Butterfly (1903), on which he collaborated with Luigi Illica. During his lifetime, however, he was appreciated as a playwright, especially in Germany and Austria: in January 1892 he attended the first performance in German of Tristi amori in Frankfurt-on-the-Main, and in the autumn of 1895 he gave a lecture in Dresden on Il cosmopolitismo e il teatro. On 8 October of the same year, the Burgtheater in Vienna gave the first performance of Arthur Schnitzler's Liebelei on a double bill with Giacosa's Diritti dell'anima (The rights of the soul), and towards the end of November 1900 Giacosa travelled to Berlin for a German version of Come le foglie. Giacosa's drama Tristi amori has been adapted for cinema twice: by Giuseppe Sterni in 1917 and by Carmine Gallone in 1943. Gallone's version, also known with the English title Sad Loves, starred Jules Berry, Gino Cervi, and Andrea Checchi. It was one of the last films produced at the Cinecittà studios in Rome before they were shut down toward the end of World War II.

== See also ==
- Scapigliatura
- Verismo
