= Alice Zeppilli =

French operatic singer

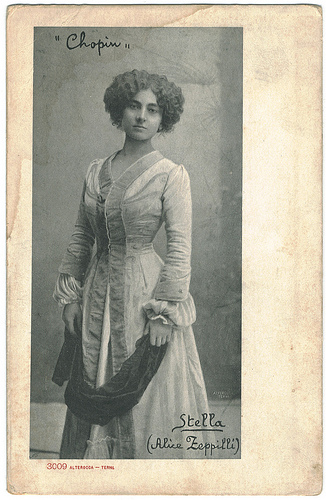
1910 photograph of Alice Zeppilli as Stella in the original production of Giacomo Orefice's Chopin

Alice Zeppilli (28 August 1885 – 14 September 1969) was a French operatic soprano of Italian heritage who had an active international singing career from 1901 to 1930. The pinnacle of her career was in the United States where she enjoyed great popularity between 1906 and 1914; particularly in the cities of Chicago, New York, and Philadelphia. She was popular in Monte Carlo where she performed frequently from 1904 to 1919 and later worked as a singing teacher after her retirement from the stage. She made only one recording, a phonograph cylinder for Columbia Records consisting of the Gavotte from Jules Massenet's Manon and Olympia's Doll Aria from Jacques Offenbach's The Tales of Hoffmann.

== Early life and education ==
Born in Menton, France, Zeppilli was the daughter of Italian parents. She was a cousin (on her mother's side) of singer Luisa Villani (1884–1961). Alice's father Nicola Zeppilli was an orchestra conductor at the Théâtre du Casino in Monte Carlo. Her father sent her back to his native country of Italy to study opera in Milan with Elettra Callery-Viviani.

== Opera career ==
Zepilli made her professional opera debut in Milan at the Teatro Lirico on 25 November 1901 at the age of 16 as Stella in the world premiere of Giacomo Orefice's Chopin. She sang that role again for her debut at La Fenice in 1902. In 1903 she had a major success in Venice as the title heroine in Jules Massenet's Cendrillon. In 1904 she appeared at the Opéra de Monte-Carlo as Gilda in Giuseppe Verdi's Rigoletto opposite Enrico Caruso as the Duke of Mantua and Roger Bourdin in the title role.

She returned to Monte Carlo periodically during her career, portraying such roles as Inès in Giacomo Meyerbeer's L'Africaine (1905), Violetta in Verdi's La traviata (1910), the title roles in Massenet's Manon (1915) and Puccini's Madama Butterfly (1916), both Thalie and Junon in Jean-Philippe Rameau's Platée (1917), Maria di Spagna in Filippo Marchetti's Ruy Blas (1919), and Nannetta in Verdi's Falstaff (1919) among other roles.

From 1905 until 1907, Zeppilli performed with a touring Italian opera company in Argentina, Egypt, Greece, and Romania. In 1907 she had great success at the Teatro Regio di Parma as Jebbel in Alberto Franchetti's Germania. She was seen that year in Parma as Anna di Rehberg in Alfredo Catalani's Loreley. She made her debut at the Royal Opera House, Covent Garden in London in 1907 as Musetta in Giacomo Puccini's La bohème, and was also seen that year in London as Bersi in Umberto Giordano's Andrea Chénier.

From 1907 to 1910 Zeppilli was a member of Oscar Hammerstein I's Manhattan Opera Company in New York City, with whom she made her United States debut as Olympia in The Tales of Hoffmann at the Manhattan Opera House in 1907.

She served concurrently in Hammerstein's sister opera company, the Philadelphia Opera Company, from 1908 until 1910. She notably sang the role of Micaela in Georges Bizet's Carmen for the opening of the Philadelphia Opera House in 1908. In 1910 she performed in the American premiere of Jan Blockx's opera De Herbergprinses (performed in Italian as La Princesse d'Auberge). Other roles she sang with the Manhattan and Philadelphia opera companies included Irma in Louise, Marguerite de Valois in Les Huguenots, both Mimi and Musetta in La boheme, and Siébel in Faust.

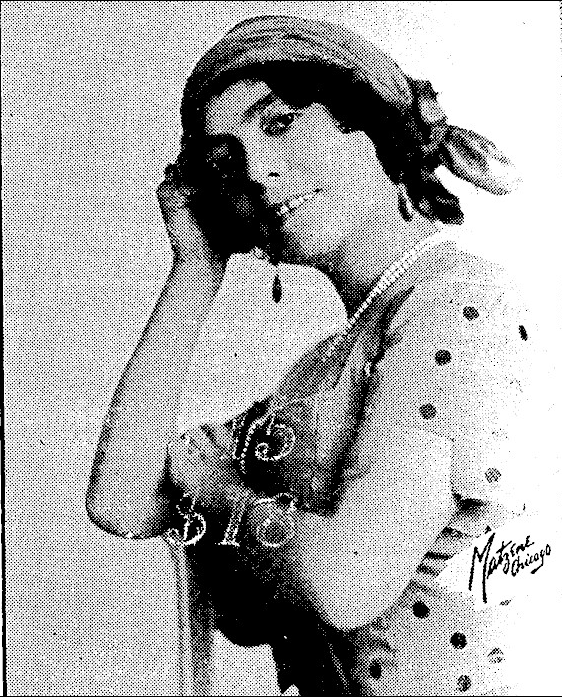
Alice Zeppilli in 1912

From 1910 until 1914, Zeppilli was a member of the Chicago Grand Opera Company which not only performed regularly in Chicago but also in Philadelphia. With the company she notably performed the role of Lygie in the United States premieres of Jean Nouguès's Quo vadis in 1911, and created the role of Rosaura in the world premiere of Attilio Parelli's I dispettosi amanti in 1912.

Some of the other roles she sang with the company included both Antonia and Olympia in The Tales of Hoffmann, Cio-Cio-San in Madama Butterfly, Gilda, Marguerite de Valois, Marguerite in Faust, Micaëla, Musetta, Nedda in Ruggero Leoncavallo's Pagliacci, Ophélie in Ambroise Thomas' Hamlet, Santuzza in Cavalleria rusticana, Susanna in Wolfgang Amadeus Mozart's The Marriage of Figaro, Violetta, Zerlina in Don Giovanni, and the title roles in Ermanno Wolf-Ferrari's Il segreto di Susanna, Victor Herbert's Natoma, and Puccini's Tosca among others. In 1913 she married Giuseppe Alberghini, a cellist in the Chicago Symphony Orchestra.

In 1909-1910, Zeppilli also performed at the Opéra-Comique in Paris where she made her debut as the title heroine in Léo Delibes' Lakmé, and was also heard as Massenet's Manon.

While there she studied singing further with soprano Rose Caron. In 1913 she married Giuseppe Alberghini, first cello of the Chicago Symphony Orchestra. In 1914 she again appeared at the Royal Opera House in London as Nannetta, Susanna, Musetta, and Oscar in Verdi's Un ballo in maschera. In 1917–1918 she was committed to the Teatro Costanzi in Rome where she performed the roles of Alice Ford in Falstaff, Mimì and Cio-Cio-San. In 1919 she was heard at the Teatro San Carlo in Naples.

In 1915 her husband was recalled to the army for the outbreak of the First World War and she followed him to Italy, where he continued to perform theaters in France and Italy (including Milan, Naples, Parma, Rome, and Turin). During the war, her husband met the Italian poet Gabriele D'Annunzio, as his superior captain, who began a great friendship with the couple, even after the end of the war.

== Teacher and later life ==
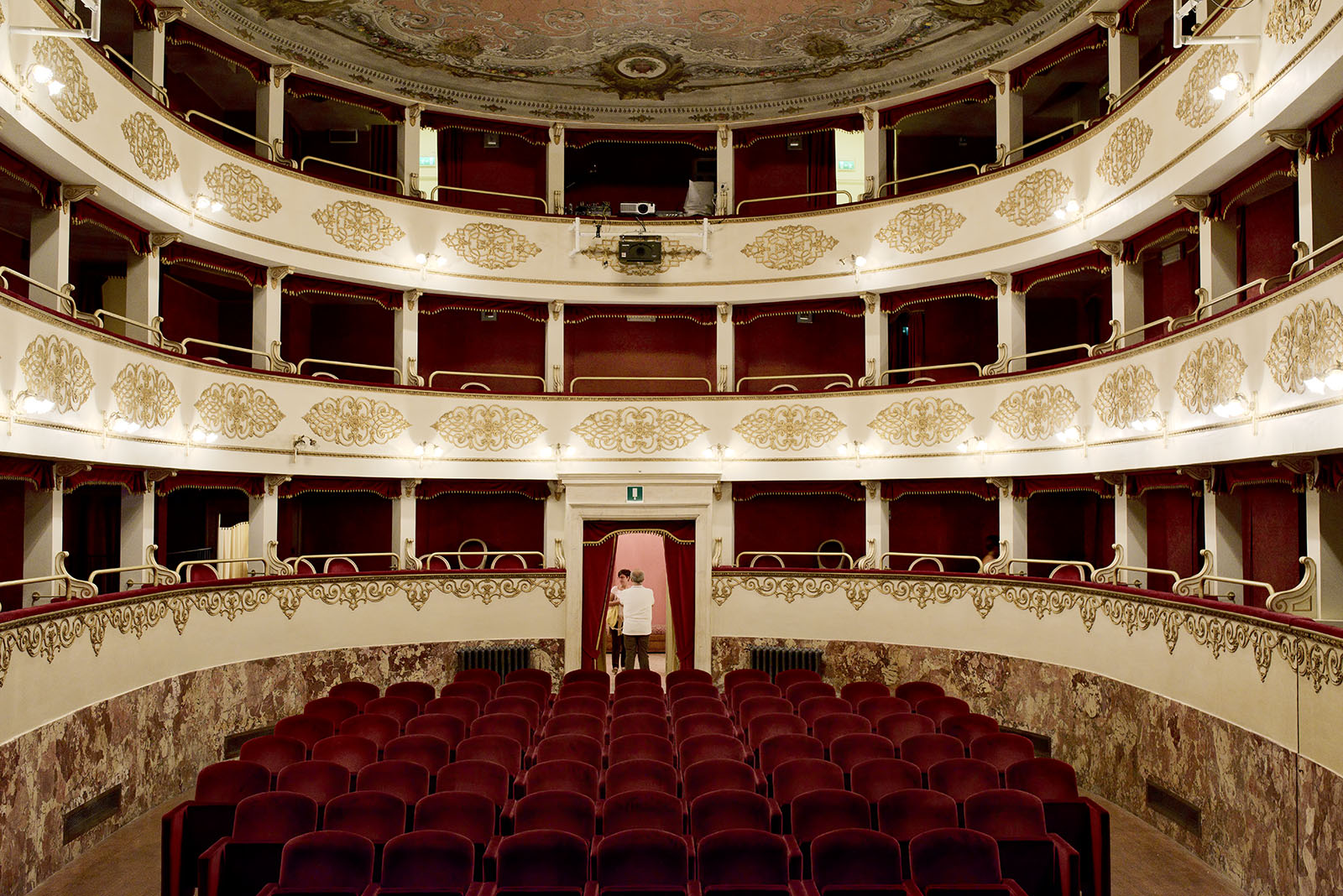
Teatro comunale Alice Zeppilli in Pieve di Cento, Italy)

After World War I, Zeppilli and her husband relocated to New York City. At this point her career began to slow down, although she did perform periodically in operas in Italy and the United States up until 1926. She continued to perform in recitals and vaudeville and on radio in New York City up until 1930. After that, she and her husband divided their time between homes in New York City, Monte Carlo, and Pieve di Cento.

Zeppilli taught singers in both New York and Monte Carlo while her husband continued to work for a variety of orchestras; including playing as a cellist in the Metropolitan Opera orchestra. Her pupils included Lily Pons and Doretta Morrow. After her husband's death in 1954, she settled permanently in Pieve di Cento, where she died in 1969. The Teatro comunale Alice Zeppilli there is named in her memory.
