= Joseph-Théodore-Désiré Barbot =

French operatic tenor

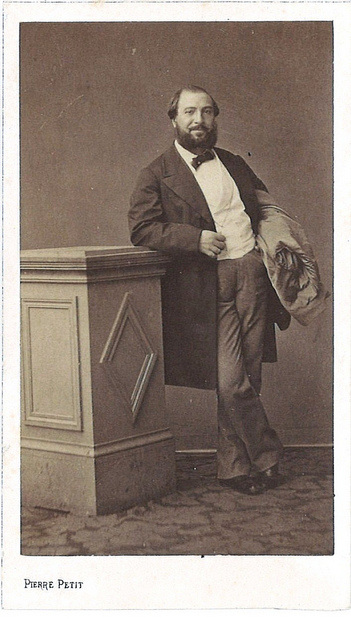
Joseph-Théodore-Désiré Barbot, c.1865

Joseph-Théodore-Désiré Barbot, born in Toulouse on 12 April 1824, died in Paris on 1 January 1879, was a French operatic tenor. He is most notable for creating the title role in Charles Gounod's opera "Faust".

== Training and career ==
Joseph-Théodore-Désiré Barbot began his musical training at the Toulouse Cathedral and at first studied the violin. He moved to Paris and entered the Paris Conservatoire, intending to study composition and the violin, but on the advice of his professor, switched to studying voice with Manuel Garcia the younger. He won first prize in singing at the Conservatoire in 1847, and made his debut at the Paris Opera in the leading tenor role in Rossini's Le Comte Ory in that year. He went on to sing leading tenor roles at the Paris Opera in works including La dame blanche of Boieldieu, Le chalet by Adolphe Adam, and La Juive by Halévy. When his singing teacher at the Paris Conservatoire, Manuel Garcia, relocated to London, Barbot replaced him there. Among his pupils was soprano Caroline Douvry, whom he married. They subsequently sang together for three years in leading roles at the Théâtre Royal de la Monnaie in Brussels. In 1859, Barbot replaced the originally scheduled tenor, Hector Gruyer, in the title role in the world premiere of Gounod's Faust at the Théâtre Lyrique in Paris, and achieved a great success. Joseph-Théodore-Désiré Barbot was praised for his vocal range, his ability to spin beautiful high notes softly, his charm onstage, and his musical tastefulness. Successful in Italian operas as well as French, he and his wife Caroline enjoyed international careers, sometimes appearing together, at leading opera houses in France, England, Italy and Russia (where Caroline created the leading soprano role of Leonora in Verdi's La Forza del Destino in 1862). When Pauline Viardot retired as professor of singing at the Paris Conservatoire in 1875, he replaced her, and continued to teach singing there until his death.
