= Manon Lescaut (Puccini) =

Opera by Giacomo Puccini

- Opera by Giacomo Puccini
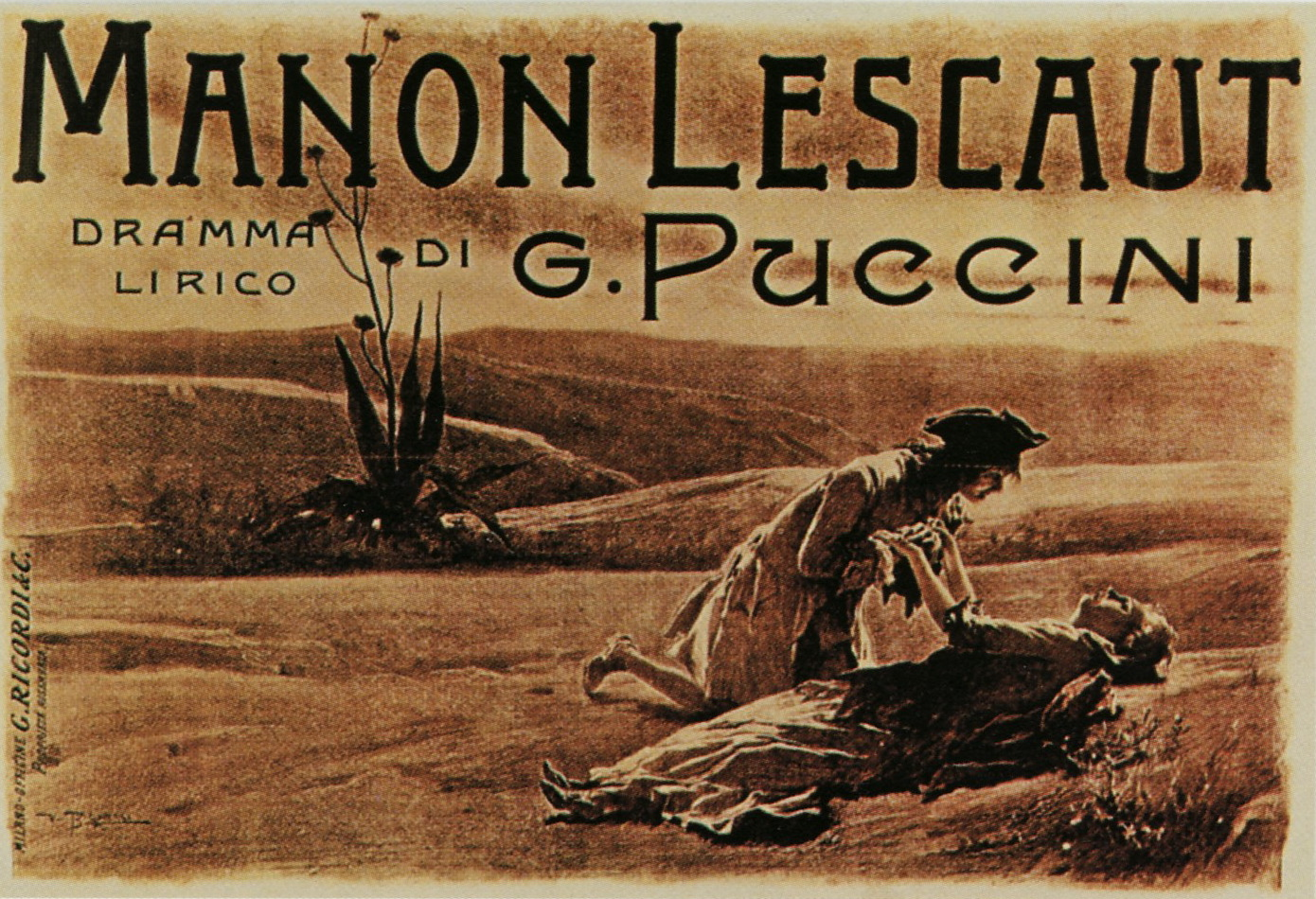
- Postcard commemorating the premiere
- Librettist: Luigi Illica; Giuseppe Giacosa; Marco Praga; Domenico Oliva
- Language: Italian
- Based on: Abbé Prévost's novel Histoire du Chevalier des Grieux, et de Manon Lescaut
- Premiere: 1 February 1893; Teatro Regio, Turin

Manon Lescaut (Italian: [maˈnɔn leˈsko]) is an Italian-language opera in four acts composed by Giacomo Puccini between 1889 and 1892 to a libretto by Luigi Illica, Giuseppe Giacosa, Marco Praga and Domenico Oliva, based on the 1731 novel Histoire du Chevalier des Grieux, et de Manon Lescaut by Abbé Prévost. The opera was first performed in 1893 in Turin, at the Teatro Regio.

== Composition history ==
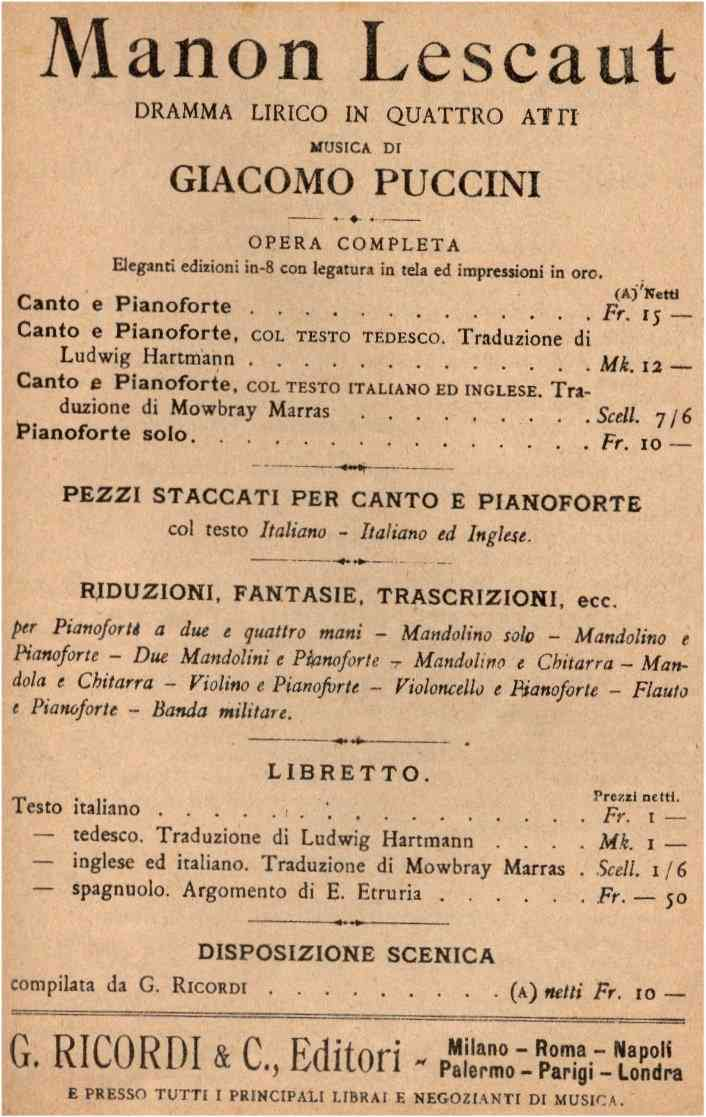
Advertisement for libretto, 1917

The libretto is in Italian, and was cobbled together by five librettists whom Puccini employed: Ruggero Leoncavallo, Marco Praga, Domenico Oliva, Giuseppe Giacosa and Luigi Illica. The publisher, Giulio Ricordi, and the composer himself also contributed to the libretto. So confused was the authorship of the libretto that no one was credited on the title page of the original score. However, it was Illica and Giacosa who completed the libretto and went on to contribute the libretti to Puccini's next three – and most successful – works, La Bohème, Tosca and Madama Butterfly.

Puccini took some musical elements in Manon Lescaut from earlier works he had written. For example, the madrigal Sulla vetta tu del monte from act 2 echoes the Agnus Dei from his 1880 Messa a quattro voci. Other elements of Manon Lescaut come from his compositions for strings: the quartet Crisantemi (January 1890), three Menuets (probably 1884) and a Scherzo (1883?). The love theme comes from the aria Mentia l'avviso (1883). Puccini wrote some parts in Vacallo in Switzerland.

== Performance history ==
Puccini's publisher, Ricordi, had been against any project based on Prévost's story because Jules Massenet had already made it into a successful opera, Manon, in 1884. While Puccini and Ricordi may not have known it, the French composer Daniel Auber had also already written an opera on the same subject with the title Manon Lescaut, in 1856.

Despite all the warnings, Puccini proceeded. "Manon is a heroine I believe in and therefore she cannot fail to win the hearts of the public. Why shouldn't there be two operas about Manon? A woman like Manon can have more than one lover." He added, "Massenet feels it as a Frenchman, with powder and minuets. I shall feel it as an Italian, with a desperate passion."

The first performance of Manon Lescaut took place in the Teatro Regio in Turin on 1 February 1893; it was Puccini's third opera and his first great success. It was the first of any of Puccini's operas performed in the United States; making Puccini's debut to the American stage on August 29, 1894 at the Grand Opera House in Philadelphia. The cast included Selma Kronold as Manon and Agostino Montegriffo as des Grieux. The opera was first performed at the Metropolitan Opera in New York on 18 January 1907 in the presence of the composer with Lina Cavalieri in the title role, Enrico Caruso as des Grieux, Antonio Scotti as Lescaut, and Arturo Vigna conducting.

== Roles ==
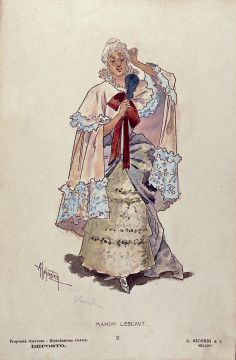
Manon's costume for act 2 designed by Adolfo Hohenstein for the world premiere

Role	Voice type	Premiere cast, 1 February 1893 (Conductor: Alessandro Pomè)
Manon Lescaut	soprano	Cesira Ferrani
Lescaut, her brother and guardian, a sergeant in the King's guard	baritone	Achille Moro
Chevalier Renato des Grieux, a student	tenor	Giuseppe Cremonini
Geronte di Ravoir, Treasurer General	bass	Alessandro Polonini
Edmondo, a student	tenor	Roberto Ramini
Innkeeper	bass	Augusto Castagnola
Singer	mezzo-soprano	Elvira Ceresoli
Dance Master	tenor	Roberto Ramini
Lamplighter	tenor	Roberto Ramini
Sergeant of the Royal Archers	bass	Ferdin Cattadori
Naval Captain	bass	
Hairdresser	silent	Augusto Ghinghini
Singers, old beaux and abbés, girls, townsfolk, students, courtesans, archers, sailors

== Synopsis ==
Time: The second half of the eighteenth century.
Places: Amiens, Paris, Le Havre, New Orleans.

=== Act 1 ===
Amiens: A large public square near the Paris Gate

"Donna non vidi mai"
From act 1, sung by Enrico Caruso in 1913

Off the square is an Avenue on one side and an Inn on the other, with a balcony. It is evening, townspeople, soldiers and a crowd of male students and girls stroll through the avenue and square while others gather in groups. Some are seated at the tables outside the Inn, drinking and gambling.

Edmondo sings a song of youthful pleasure (Edmondo, chorus of students, girls and townspeople: Ave, sera gentile – Hail gentle evening). Des Grieux enters, and they greet him, but he is melancholic and does not join the others, singing cynically of love (des Grieux, Edmondo, chorus: L'amor?, L'amor? ...io non conosco! – Love?, Love?...I know nothing of that). They joke with him and provoke him to feign flirtation with the girls (des Grieux: Tra voi, belle, brune e bionde – Among you beauties, dark and fair); (Edmondo, chorus: Ma, bravo!).

A postillion horn is heard and the carriage from Arras pulls up at the Inn, as the crowd peers in to see who the passengers are (Chorus: Giunge il cocchio d'Arras! – Here comes the Arras coach!) Lescaut (Manon's brother), then an elderly treasurer-general, Geronte di Ravoir, descend from the coach, Geronte helping Manon, then the remainder of the passengers. The crowd comments (Chorus, Edmondo, Lescaut, des Grieux, Geronte: Discendono, vediam! – Look, they are getting down!) Edmondo and the students admire Manon (Chi non darebbe a quella donnina bella? – Who would not give to that beautiful young woman?). Des Grieux is also smitten (Dio, quanto è bella! – Dear God, such beauty!). The other passengers enter the Inn, while Lescaut signals Manon to wait for him. She sits, as des Grieux, who has been fixated on her, approaches her and declares his feelings for her (des Grieux, Manon,: Cortese damigella – Gentle lady), only to learn she is destined for a convent at the will of her father. He offers to help her, and when Lescaut calls her he begs her to meet him later; she reluctantly agrees. After Manon leaves, des Grieux sings of his feelings for her (des Grieux: Donna non vidi mai – Never before have I beheld a woman such as this). The students and girls, who have been observing the couple, comment mockingly on his good fortune (Edmondo, students: La tua ventura ci rassicura – Your good fortune encourages us).

Lescaut and Geronte descend and converse in the square about Manon's fate, observed by Edmondo. Geronte, who also is captivated by Manon, says she would be wasted in a convent. On hearing his fellow traveller's opinion, Lescaut begins to reconsider his task of escorting his sister to the convent. The students invite Lescaut to join in their card game. Geronte observes that Lescaut is preoccupied with the game and discloses his plan to abduct Manon and take her to Paris to the Innkeeper, offering him money for assistance and his silence. Edmondo overhears the plan and informs des Grieux (Edmondo: Cavaliere, te la fanno! – Sir, they are outwitting you!). He offers to help des Grieux, arranging for the card players to keep Lescaut occupied.

Manon slips out of the inn to meet des Grieux as promised (Manon: Vedete? Io son fedele alla parola mia – You see? I am faithful to my word). He declares his love for her and advises her of the plot to abduct her, while Edmondo arranges for the carriage Geronte has hired to take the couple to Paris. They leave together just as Geronte arrives, ready to execute his plans (Geronte: Di sedur la sorellina e il momento! – The moment to seduce the little sister has arrived). Geronte is taunted by Edmondo. Realising he has been tricked, Geronte urges Lescaut to follow the departed pair. The more pragmatic Lescaut advises him that the pair will soon run out of money, and then Manon will be his.

=== Act 2 ===
A room in Geronte's house in Paris

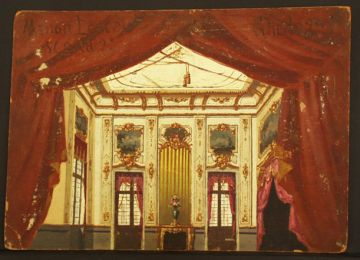
Set design for act 2 by Ugo Gheduzzi for the world premiere performance

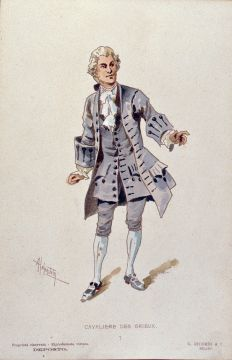
Chevalier des Grieux's costume for act 2, designed by Adolfo Hohenstein for the world premiere

(Puccini omits the part of the novel in which Manon and des Grieux live together for a few months, and Manon leaves des Grieux when his money has run out.)

Manon is now Geronte's mistress. Manon and her hairdresser are in the room when Lescaut enters (Manon, Lescaut: Dispettosetto questo riccio!); (Lescaut: Sei splendida e lucente!). She tells him that Geronte is too old and wicked; he bores her. Manon is sad, and her thoughts turn to des Grieux (Manon: In quelle trine morbide); (Lescaut, Manon: Poiché tu vuoi saper).

Musicians hired by Geronte enter to amuse her (Madrigal: Sulla vetta tu del monte); (Manon, Lescaut: Paga costor). Geronte brings a dancing master; they dance a minuet, then she sings a gavotte (Dancing master, Geronte, Manon, chorus: Vi prego, signorina [minuet]); (Manon, Geronte, chorus: L'ora, o Tirsi, è vaga e bella). After dancing, Geronte and the musicians leave the house.

Dismayed that his sister is unhappy living with Geronte, Lescaut goes to find des Grieux. Des Grieux appears in Geronte's house (Manon, des Grieux: Oh, sarò la più bella! – This love's own magic spell). As des Grieux and Manon renew their vows of love, Geronte returns unexpectedly. He salutes the couple, reminding Manon of his many favors to her, including some precious jewels. She replies that she cannot love him (Geronte, des Grieux, Manon: Affè, madamigella).

Bowing low, he leaves them. Manon rejoices in their freedom (Manon: Ah! Ah! Liberi!); (des Grieux: "Ah, manon, mi tradisce il tuo folle pensiero). Lescaut urges them to leave the house at once, but Manon hesitates at the thought of leaving her jewels and pretty frocks. Again, Lescaut enters in breathless haste, making signs that they must depart immediately. Manon snatches up her jewels, and they go to the door. It has been locked by Geronte's order. Soldiers appear to arrest Manon who, in trying to escape, drops the jewels at Geronte's feet. She is dragged away and des Grieux is not permitted to follow her (des Grieux, Manon, Lescaut, sergeant, Geronte: Lescaut! – Tu qui?).

(Intermezzo: The journey to Le Havre.)

His various efforts to have Manon released and even to free her by force having failed, des Grieux follows her to Le Havre.

=== Act 3 ===
A square near the harbor in Le Havre

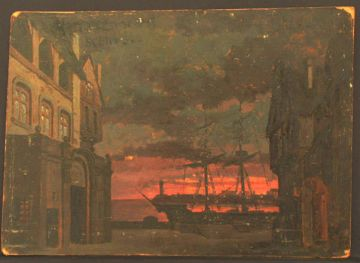
Set design for act 3 by Ugo Gheduzzi for the world premiere performance

At dawn Manon is with the other imprisoned courtesans (des Grieux, Lescaut, Manon: Ansia eterna, crudel). Lescaut has bribed a guard to let des Grieux speak with Manon. Talking to her through the bars, he learns that she is to be deported to Louisiana. A lamplighter passes, singing a song as he extinguishes the lights (Lamplighter, des Grieux, Manon: E Kate ripose al re); (des Grieux, Manon: Manon, disperato è il mio prego).

They attempt a rescue, but in vain. The guard appears, escorting a group of women, who are going on the same ship as Manon. She walks among them, pale and sad. The crowd makes brutal comments during the roll call of the courtesans (Chorus, Lescaut, des Grieux, Manon: All'armi! All'armi!), but Lescaut inspires pity for Manon (Sergeant, chorus, Lescaut, Manon, des Grieux: Rosetta! – Eh, che aria!).

Des Grieux, in despair at the idea of being separated from Manon forever, goes to her side. He tries to seize her but is pushed away by the sergeant. However, the captain of the ship sees his intense grief (des Grieux: Pazzo son!) and allows him to board the ship.

=== Act 4 ===
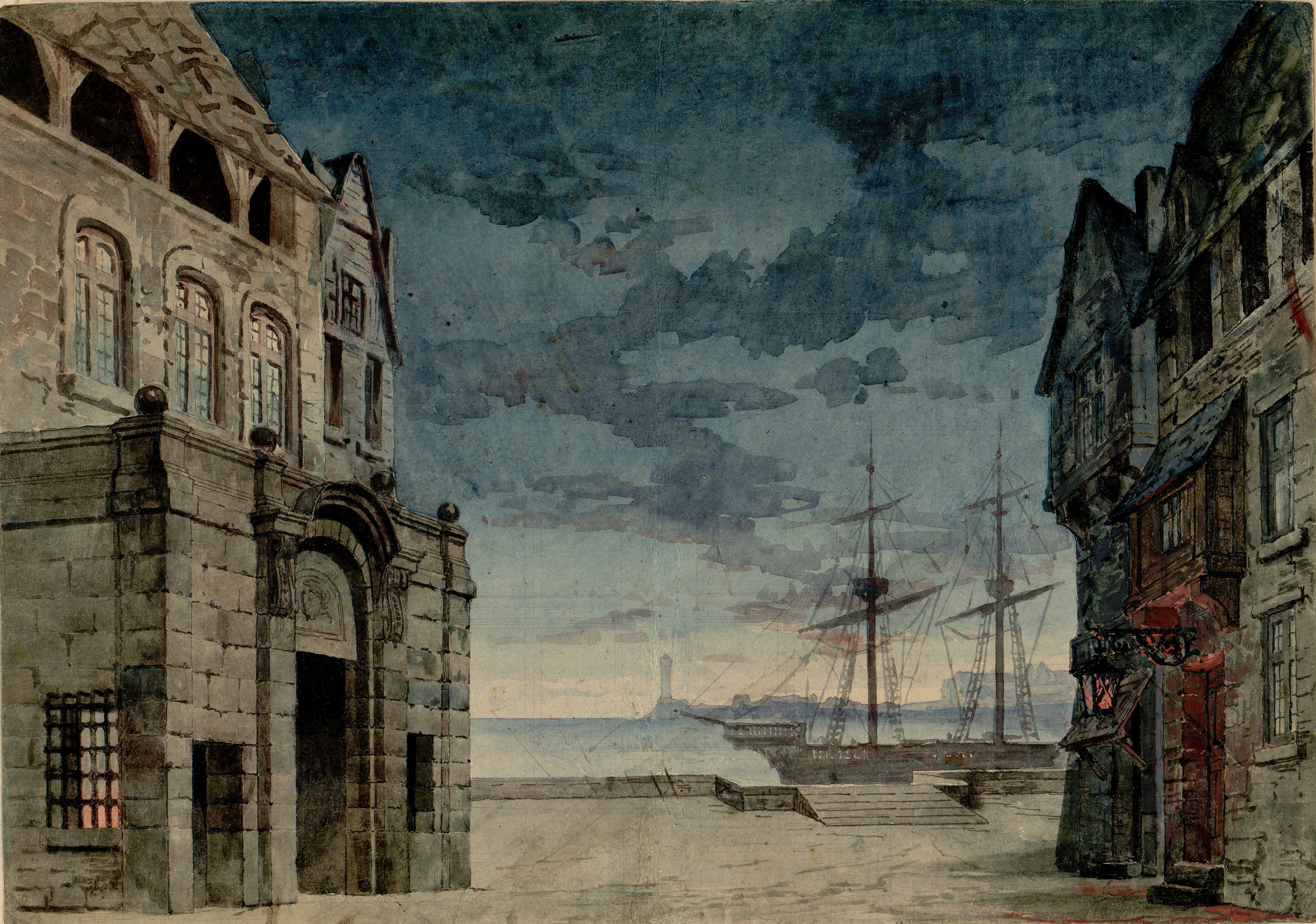
Un sito ridente alla porte del Chiostro di S. Giusto, set design for Manon Lescaut act 3 (1893).

A vast plain near the outskirts of the New Orleans territory

Having fled the jealous intrigues of New Orleans, the lovers make their way across a desert to seek refuge in a British settlement. (Modern day Louisiana, however, has no desert. This probably refers to Louisiana (New France)) Wandering in the desert, the ailing Manon is exhausted. She falls and cannot go any farther (des Grieux, Manon: Tutta su me ti posa); (des Grieux: Vedi, son io che piango); (Manon, des Grieux: Sei tu che piangi).

Des Grieux is alarmed by Manon's appearance and goes to look for water. While he is gone, Manon recalls her past and muses about her fatal beauty and her fate (Manon: Sola, perduta, abbandonata).

Des Grieux returns, having been unable to find water. Manon bids him a heart-rending farewell, however not before complaining about how her life has not been fair and that she is no longer beautiful. Before dying in his arms Manon asks des Grieux to tell her how beautiful she used to be, and how he must forgive her wrongdoings and faults before she dies, not listening to him repeat how much he loves her and will miss her. Overcome by grief at the death of his vain and selfish lover, des Grieux collapses across her body (Manon, des Grieux: Fra le tue braccia, amore).

== Instrumentation ==
The opera is scored for piccolo (doubling 3rd flute), two flutes, two oboes, cor anglais, two clarinets, bass clarinet, two bassoons, four horns, three trumpets, three trombones, bass tuba, timpani, triangle, drum, tam-tam, bass drum, cymbals, glockenspiel, celesta, harp, and strings, together with offstage flute, offstage cornet, offstage bell, offstage drum, and offstage sleigh bells.

== Recordings ==
Year	Cast (Manon Lescaut, des Grieux, Lescaut)	Conductor, Opera house and orchestra	Label
1931	Maria Zamboni, Francesco Merli, Lorenzo Conati	Lorenzo Molajoli, Teatro alla Scala Orchestra and Chorus	CD: Arkadia; Cat: 78014
1946	Natalia Rozhdestvenskaya, Dmitri Tarkhov, Vladimir Zakharov	Alexander Orlov, Moscow Radio Symphony Orchestra and Chorus	CD: Aquarius; Cat: AQVR 332-2
1953	Clara Petrella, Vasco Campagnano, Saturno Meletti	Federico Del Cupolo, RAI (Turin) Orchestra and Chorus	CD: Warner Fonit; Cat: 8573 87474-2
1954	Licia Albanese, Jussi Björling, Robert Merrill	Jonel Perlea, Rome Opera orchestra and chorus	LP: RCA Victrola; Cat: VIC-6027; CD: RCA Victor; Cat: 60573-2-RG
1954	Renata Tebaldi, Mario Del Monaco, Mario Boriello	Francesco Molinari-Pradelli, Accademia di Santa Cecilia, Roma orchestra and chorus	CD: Decca; Cat: SXL 6011
1957	Maria Callas, Giuseppe Di Stefano, Giulio Fioravanti	Tullio Serafin, La Scala Orchestra and Chorus	CD: EMI; Cat: CDS5 56301 2 (Mono)
1971	Montserrat Caballé, Plácido Domingo, Vicente Sardinero	Bruno Bartoletti, New Philharmonia Orchestra, Ambrosian Opera Chorus	CD: EMI Classic; Cat: 7 47736-8
1980	Renata Scotto, Plácido Domingo, Pablo Elvira	James Levine, Metropolitan Opera Orchestra and Chorus	DVD: Deutsche Grammophon; Cat: 00440 073 4241
1984	Kiri Te Kanawa, Plácido Domingo, Thomas Allen	Giuseppe Sinopoli, Royal Opera House Orchestra and Chorus (Recording of a performance at Covent Garden, 17 May)	DVD: Kultur Video; Cat: 5046671742
1984	Mirella Freni, Plácido Domingo, Renato Bruson	Giuseppe Sinopoli, Philharmonia Orchestra; Royal Opera House Chorus	CD: Deutsche Grammophon; Cat: 413 893-2
1992	Miriam Gauci, Kaludi Kaludov, Vicente Sardinero	Alexander Rahbari, BRT Philharmonic Orchestra and chorus Jaak Gregor Choir	CD: Naxos; Cat: 8.506028
1993	Mirella Freni, Luciano Pavarotti, Dwayne Croft	James Levine, Metropolitan Opera Orchestra and Chorus	CD: Decca; Cat: 440 200-2
1998	Maria Guleghina, José Cura, Lucio Gallo	Riccardo Muti, La Scala Orchestra and Chorus	CD: Deutsche Grammophon; Cat: 463 186-2
2014	Ana María Martínez, Andrea Bocelli, Javier Arrey	Plácido Domingo, Orquestra de la Comunitat Valenciana, Coro de la Generalitat Valenciana	CD: Decca; Cat: 478 7490
2014	Kristine Opolais, Jonas Kaufmann, Christopher Maltman	Antonio Pappano, Royal Opera House Orchestra and Chorus (Recorded 26 June; Director: Jonathan Kent)	HD video: ROH Stream

== Bibliography ==
- Anthony Tommasini, The New York Times Essential Library of Opera, Times Books (Henry Holt and Company), 2004.
- Julian Budden, Manon Lescaut, Grove Music Online, 2005.
- Giacomo Puccini, Manon Lescaut. Full score. Milan: Ricordi, 1958.
- Weaver, William; Puccini, Simonetta (2000). The Puccini Companion: Essays on Puccini's Life and Music. W. W. Norton & Company. ISBN 0-393-32052-9.
- Weaver, William (1992). Manon Lescaut: Puccini's first triumph (CD Booklet). Decca. 440 200-2.
- "Manon Lescaut". Libretti d'Opera Italiani. 2016.
