= Eshleman =

Eshleman is a surname. It is an anglicized form of the Swiss German surname Aeschlimann. Notable people with the surname include:

- Clayton Eshleman (born 1935), American poet, translator, and editor
- Edwin Duing Eshleman (1920–1985), American politician who represented Pennsylvania in the US House of Representatives
- John Morton Eshleman (1876–1916), American lawyer and California politician, Californian lieutenant governor 1915–1916
- Von R. Eshleman (1924–2017), American radio astronomer
