= Wladimir Vogel =

Swiss composer (1896–1984)

Wladimir Rudolfowitsch Vogel
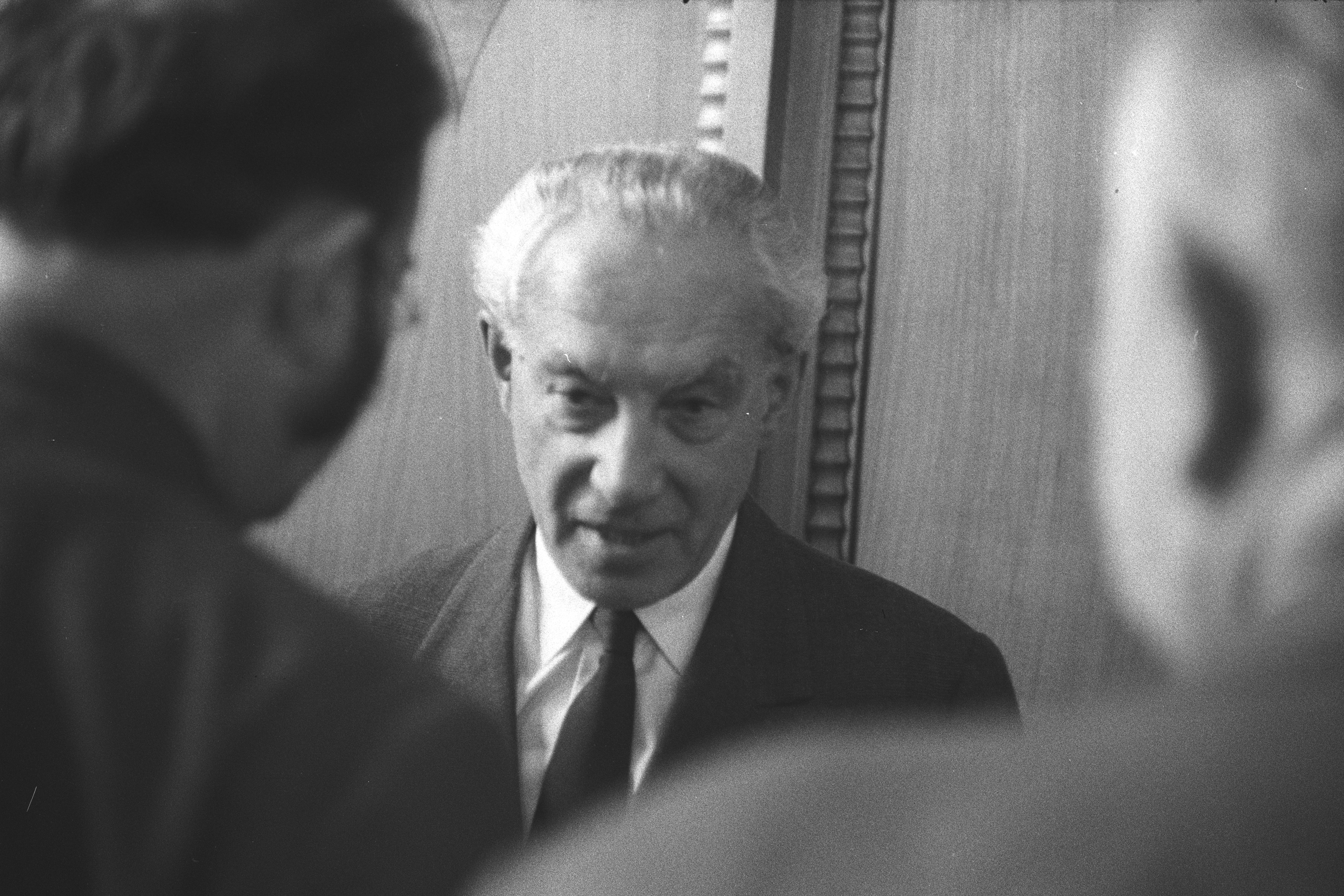
- Vogel at the congress of writers in St. Gallen (1957)
- Born: 29 February 1896; Moscow
- Died: 19 June 1984 (aged 88); Zurich
- Movement: Neue Musik; November Group
- Spouses: Katja Sommer (1930); Aline Valangin (1954); Ida Maria Tschudi (1965)
- Awards: Berliner Kunstpreis (1960); Musikpreis der Stadt Zürich (1970); Kompositionspreis des Schweizerischen tonkünstlervereins (1972)

Wladimir Rudolfowitsch Vogel (29 February [O.S. 17 February] 1896 – 19 June 1984) was a Swiss composer of German and Russian descent.

== Life ==
Born in Moscow, Vogel first studied composition in Moscow with Alexander Scriabin, then between 1918 and 1924 with Heinz Tiessen and Ferruccio Busoni in Berlin, where he subsequently taught (1930–33) at the Klindworth-Scharwenka Conservatory. He was close to the expressionist circle around Herwarth Walden and was active in the music section of the November Group of Max Butting and Hans Heinz Stuckenschmidt.

In 1933, he left Germany as he was branded a "degenerate artist" and hunted by the Nazi regime due to his Jewish heritage and his involvement with the avantgardist Neue Musik scene. He first turned to twelve-tone technique with his Violin Concerto in 1937. From 1939 he lived in Switzerland, at first in Ascona and from 1964 in Zürich. Although Vogel was not permitted to work in Switzerland prior to his naturalisation in 1954, he taught composition privately and was active in various musical organisations, such as the ISCM. He also attended Hermann Scherchen’s ‘Sessions d’études musicales et dramatiques’ and organized the International Twelve-Tone Music pre-conference in Osilina in 1949. During this time, he was financially dependent on his wife Aline Valangin and other benefactors. His students include Erik Bergman, Tauno Marttinen, Maurice Karkoff, Rodolfo Holzmann, Robert Suter, Einojuhani Rautavaara, Andree Aeschlimann Rochat, Rolf Liebermann and Hermann Meier. See: List of music students by teacher: T to Z#Wladimir Vogel.

He died in Zurich at the age of 88.

== Compositions (selective list) ==
Vogel composed a symphony, pieces for orchestra, string orchestra, wind ensemble, a concerto for violin and another for cello, works for choir, soloists and orchestra—the most important of which, called "drama-oratorios", are based on a synthesis of speech and song—and chamber-music works.

- Drei Sprechlieder nach August Stramm for baritone and piano (1922)
- Sinfonischer Vorgang for large orchestra (1922–23)
- Wagadus Untergang durch die Eitelkeit, drama-oratorio (1930)
- Sinfonia fugata for large orchestra (1930–1932)
- Vier Etüden for large orchestra (1930–1932)
- Variétude for piano (1931)
- Rallye for orchestra (1932)
- Violin Concerto (1937)
- Thyl Claes, Parts I and II, drama-oratorio (1941–42 and 1943–45)
- In memoriam, Two Sonnets by Roger Vuataz for contralto, viola, harp and timpani, VWV 42 (1947)
- Jona ging doch nach Ninive, drama-oratorio (1957–58)
- Meditazione sulla maschera di Modigliani, drama-oratorio (1960)
- An die akademische Jugend (Notker Balbulus) for mixed choir a cappella (1962)
- Worte (Hans Arp) for 2 speaking voices and strings (1962)
- Flucht, drama-oratorio (1963–64)
- Mondträume (Hans Arp), permutations and paraphrases after verses from Mondsand by Hans Arp for speaking choir a cappella (1965)
- Hörformen I for orchestra (1967)
- Hörformen II for orchestra (1967–69)
- Gli spaziali drama-oratorio (1970–71)
- Abschied for string orchestra (1973)
- Vier Versionen einer Zwölftonfolge for piano (1973)
- Meloformen for string orchestra (1974)
- Hommage nach einer 6-Tonfolge von Hermann Jöhr for strings in variable scoring (1975)
- Composition for chamber orchestra (1976)
- In Signum IM for large orchestra (1976)
- Verstrebungen for chamber orchestra (1977)
- Kleine Hörformen for viola and piano, VWV 51 (1979)
- Reigen for chamber orchestra (1981)
- Humoreske, Paraphrasen über 2 Themen von Gottschalk and Tschaikowsky for large orchestra (1981)
- Trio for three clarinets (1982)
- Klangexpressionen (Bulgakov), string quartet (1983)
- Colori e movimenti for orchestra (1983)
