= Emilio Praga =

Italian painter (1839–1875)

- Born: 18 December 1839; Milan
- Died: 26 December 1875 (aged 36); Milan

Signature
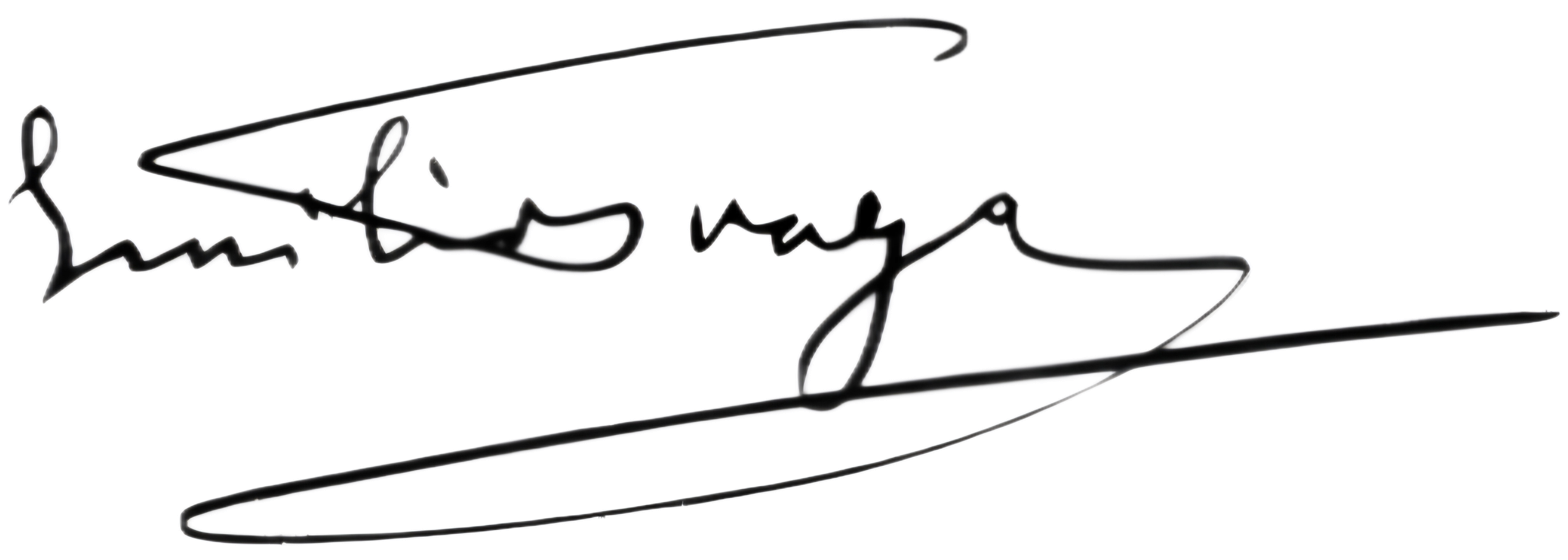

Emilio Praga (18 December 1839 – 26 December 1875) was an Italian writer, painter, poet, and librettist. He is the father of the artist Marco Praga. He belongs to the artistic movement Scapigliatura and Lombard line.

== Biography ==
Born to a wealthy Milanese family, Praga destroyed himself largely through alcohol and drugs after his father's death plunged the family into poverty. He had been a painter before turning to poetry with Tavolozza (1862). He became a leading presence in the Milanese Scapigliatura, writing its artistic manifesto with Camillo Boito in 1864. He published stories and libretti, as well as the poems of Penombre (1864), inspired to Charles Baudelaire, and Fiabe e leggende (1867). A novel, Memorie di un presbiterio, was completed after his death by Roberto Sacchetti.

Le madri galanti, 1863

Penombre, 1864

Fiabe e leggende, 1867

Memorie del presbiterio, 1881
