= Alessandro Polonini =

Italian opera singer

Alessandro Polonini (1844, Crema – 1920, Crema) was an Italian bass-baritone. He created the roles of Benoît and Alcindoro in Puccini's opera La bohème, as well as Geronte de Ravoir in his Manon Lescaut. Polonini also created the role of the surgeon in Verdi's La forza del destino.

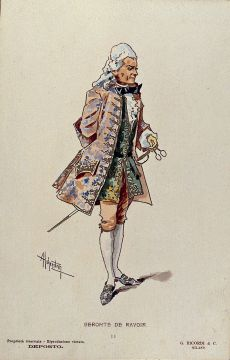
Polonini's costume for act 2 of Manon Lescaut, designed by Adolf Hohenstein for the world premiere

== Career ==
During his career Polonini sang throughout Italy, and also appeared in Barcelona (Gran Teatre del Liceu), Saint Petersburg (Bolshoi Kamenny Theatre), Buenos Aires (Teatro Colón) and Montevideo (Teatro Solis). In 1881, he sang at the Teatro Costanzi in Rome in the theatre's first performances of Rossini's The Barber of Seville (Figaro), Bellini's La sonnambula (Count Rodolfo), and Verdi's La forza del destino (Fra Melitone). He returned there in 1894 for the Costanzi's first performance of Manon Lescaut (Geronte). Polonini appeared frequently at the Teatro Regio di Torino. In addition to his performances there in the world premieres of Manon Lescaut (1893) and La bohème (1896), he sang in the world premieres of two now forgotten Italian operas – Antonio Cagnoni's Francesca da Rimini (1878) and Gaetano Luporini's I dispetti amorosi (1894). Polonini was also Beckmesser in the Teatro Regio's first performance of Wagner's Die Meistersinger von Nürnberg (1893).

== Eutimio Polonini ==
Alessandro Polonini's father, Eutimio Polonini (or Entimio P., born circa 1820), was also an opera singer (bass) who sang in Italy, Paris, Saint Petersburg and London. In Italy, Eutimio Polonini sang in the premieres of Saverio Mercadante's Il bravo, ossia La veneziana, (La Scala, 1839) and Otto Nicolai's Il templario (Teatro Regio di Torino, 1840). He made his London debut in 1847 and for 21 years sang with the Royal Italian Opera. In April 1855 he appeared there in Beethoven's Fidelio in the presence of Queen Victoria and Napoleon III, as part of the French emperor's state visit to Britain. Eutimio Polonini also performed in other cities in Britain and Ireland with impresario Thomas Willert Beale's touring opera company.
