= Andree Rochat =

Swiss composer, pianist (1900–1990)

Andree Aeschlimann Rochat (12 January 1900 – 8 January 1990) was a Swiss composer, music critic, and pianist who used the pseudonym Jean Durand. She spent more than forty years in Milan, where she wrote music reviews in several magazines, which were later published as a collection. Rochat composed music for small ensembles, and was awarded the GEDOK prize. She destroyed many of her compositions.

== Life ==
Rochat was born in Geneva, Switzerland, to Julie Helene Lavater and Ernest Auguste Rochat, a pastor. She married Erhard Aeschlimann, a publisher. Rochat studied music at the Geneva Conservatory and in Ascona, Switzerland; Milan, Italy; and at the Paris Conservatory. Her teachers included Rinaldo Renzo Bossi, Emile Jacques Dalcroze, Andre Gedalge, Giacomo Orefice, Vladimir Vogel, and Ernst Wolff.

Rochat lived in Milan from 1922 to 1964, where she published music reviews in several magazines under the pseudonym Jean Durand. In 1941, the reviews were published as a collection entitled Journal d'un Amateur de Musique.

Rochat composed mostly atonal music for small ensembles. In 1961, her composition Musica per Archi, opus 26, received the GEDOK (Gemeinschaft deutscher und oesterreichischer Künstlerinnen und Kunstfreundinnen; Community of German and Austrian Women Artists and Art Friends) prize. Although she composed works through at least opus 34, she destroyed many of her compositions, saying that she “did not want to burden anyone with them.” In 1965, she moved to Zurich, where she joined the Swiss Musicians' Association and lived until her death in 1990.

Some of Rochat’s compositions have survived; several were published by Carisch. They include:

== Chamber ==
- Cinque Pezzi Brevi (flute and piano)
- Improvisation, opus 34 (flute, piano and drums)
- Musica per Archi, opus 26
- Sonata, opus 12 (violin and piano)
- Sonata, opus 20 (flute and harp)
- Suite, opus 25 (two violins)
- Tre Intermezzi, opus 14 (clarinet and piano)

== Piano ==
- Kadeidoscope, opus 30
- Trois Pieces, opus 32

== Vocal ==
- Au Jardin Suite, opus 28 (soprano, mezzo-soprano, flute and violin; text by Mostefa Lacheraf)
- De Musica, opus 31 (baritone, violin, trumpet, piano and drums; text by St. Augustine)
- Seven Sonnets (soprano and piano; text by Alighieri Dante)
- Tre Liriche, opus 19 (soprano and piano; text by Antonio Negri)
