= Donna non vidi mai =

Aria from the opera Manon Lescaut by Giacomo Puccini

"Donna non vidi mai"
From Manon Lescaut, act 1; Enrico Caruso (1913)

"Donna non vidi mai" ("I have never seen a woman such as this one") is a tenor aria from the act 1 of Giacomo Puccini's opera Manon Lescaut. It is sung by Des Grieux, revealing his feelings about Manon Lescaut, a beautiful young lady whose father is sending her to a convent.

The scene is a square near the Paris gate in Amiens, France, in the 18th century.

== Libretto ==
Donna non vidi mai simile a questa!
A dirle: io t'amo,
a nuova vita l'alma mia si desta.
"Manon Lescaut mi chiamo!"
Come queste parole profumate
mi vagan nello spirto
e ascose fibre vanno a carezzare.
O sussurro gentil,
deh! non cessare!

I have never seen a woman such as this one!
To tell her "I love you",
my soul awakens to new life.
"Manon Lescaut is my name!"
How these fragrant words
wander through my mind
and come to caress my innermost fibers.
O sweet murmur,
ah! do not cease!
