= Caroline Barbot =

French operatic soprano

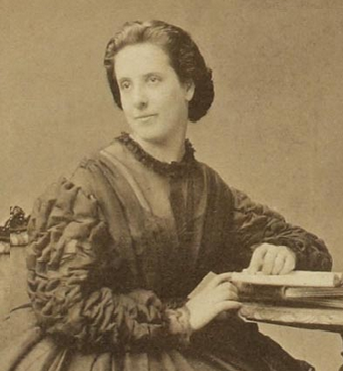
Caroline Barbot c1865

Caroline Barbot (née Marie-Caroline Douvry) (27 April 1830 in Paris – 17 September 1893), was a French operatic soprano. She is most notable for creating the role of Leonora in "La Forza del Destino" by Verdi in Saint Petersburg, Russia, in 1862.

== Training and career ==
Caroline Barbot studied at the Paris Conservatoire with Manuel Garcia the younger and won first prize for singing upon completion of her studies in 1850. She married the tenor Joseph-Théodore-Désiré Barbot and appeared with him in operas in France, Belgium, Italy and Russia. Upon their return to Paris, her husband created the role of Faust in Gounod's opera of the same name at the Théâtre Lyrique while Caroline appeared in leading roles in operas by Bellini, Meyerbeer and Verdi at the Paris Opera.

Verdi saw her in his opera "Les vêpres siciliennes" in Paris and chose her to create the leading role of Leonora in his opera "La Forza del Destino" in St.Petersburg. The premiere was scheduled for 1861, but when Verdi arrived in Russia to supervise the rehearsals, Barbot was ill. Rather than accept a substitute in the leading role of Leonora, Verdi returned to Italy and came back to Russia the following season where the opera achieved great success with Barbot, as planned, as Leonora. Caroline appeared with her husband in subsequent seasons in Russia, and she continued her international career in France, Italy and England until 1872. Her husband became a singing teacher at the Conservatoire in Paris upon his retirement from the stage, and Caroline died in that city in 1893.
