= Chopin (opera) =

Opera by Giacomo Orefice

Chopin is a four-act opera by Giacomo Orefice (1865–1922) to a libretto by Angiolo Orvieto, premiered in Milan in 1901.

The opera, which is "a wildly inaccurate account" of the life of Frédéric Chopin, is based entirely on his music, orchestrated by Orefice. The vocal score indicates the sources of the music, which include Chopin's sonatas, polonaises, mazurkas and nocturnes.

== Roles ==
Role	Voice type	Premiere cast Teatro Lirico, Milan 25 November 1901
Frédéric Chopin	tenor	Giuseppe Borgatti
Stella, Chopin's first love	soprano	Luisa Beltrami
Elio, Chopin's friend	baritone	Rodolfo Angelini Fornari
Flora	mezzo-soprano	Cesira Ferrani
Grazia, daughter of Flora and Chopin	silent role	
Schoolchildren, fisherfolk of Majorca, peasants.

== Synopsis ==
The overture is based on Chopin's Fantasy on Polish Airs, Op. 13. Act I is set in a village in Poland at Christmas time. Chopin declares his love to Stella (who is, like all the opera's characters except Chopin himself, entirely fictional). In Act II, set in Paris, Elio tells a group of children about the history and struggles of Poland, inspiring Chopin to fly to the piano and write a nocturne. Chopin's new love, Flora, is also present. Act III is set in Majorca, where the real Chopin spent the winter of 1838-9 with George Sand. In this version Chopin is there with Flora and their daughter, who dies after a thunderstorm and is mourned by the local population. In Act IV, Stella arrives in Paris from Poland just in time for Chopin to expire in her arms.

== Reception ==
The opera was premiered in the Teatro Lirico, Milan, on 25 November 1901. The Musical Times reported that "this rather curious lyrical stage-work" was "a distinct success." A production in Paris in 1905 was not well received by the critic Arthur Pougin, who commented "It is an idea, perhaps ingenious but certainly bizarre, to create an opera score by borrowing the elements of various works by a genius who, throughout his life, never dreamt of writing for the theatre", and concluded that Orifece had committed "a sacrilege". A modern assessment suggests that the opera is "in essence a kitsch contribution to the last vestiges of late 19th-century romanticized bohemianism and to the Italian 'scapigliatura'".

The opera was performed at the Opera Wrocławska in Wrocław, Poland, in 2010 as part of the Chopin bicentenary celebrations.
