= Giuseppe Cremonini =

Italian opera singer (1866–1903)

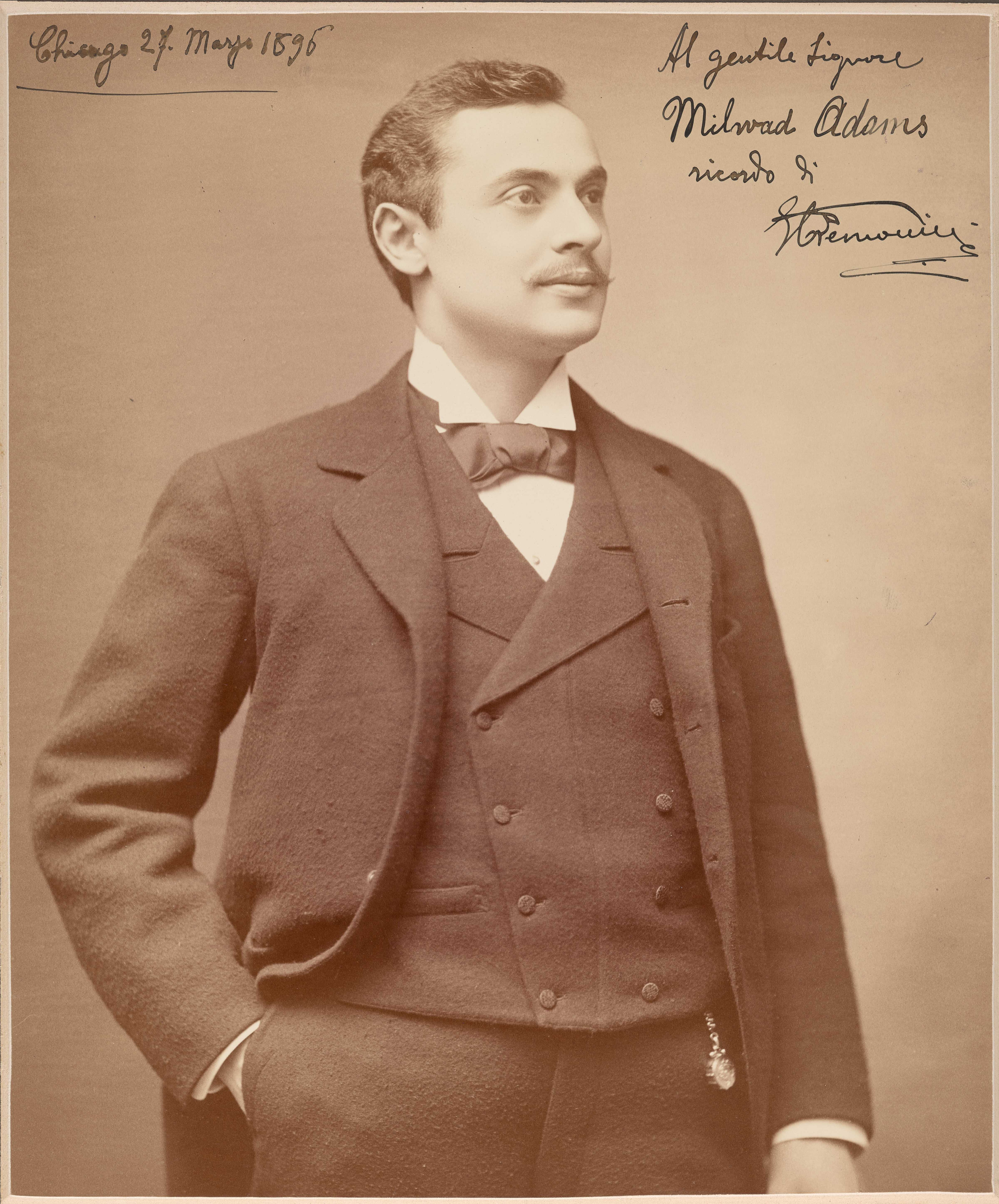
Cremonini, ca. 1896 (Newberry Library, Chicago)

Giuseppe Cremonini (25 November 1866 – 9 May 1903) was an Italian operatic tenor who had a prominent opera career in Europe and the United States during the last decade of the nineteenth century.

Cremonini was born and died in Cremona, Italy. Admired for his full lyric voice, he sang a wide repertoire that encompassed the bel canto works of Donizetti and Rossini, the Italian grand opera of Verdi, the verisimo operas of Mascagni, the French operas of Gounod and Massenet, and the German operas of Richard Wagner. He sang in several world premieres during his career, including creating the role of Chevalier des Grieux in the original 1893 production of Puccini's Manon Lescaut. An immensely popular singer, Cremonini's career abruptly ended upon his sudden death in 1903 at the age of 36.

== Biography ==
Cremonini was born into an impoverished family with the name Giuseppe Bianchi. He studied under a teacher with the surname of Cima. Taking on the name Giuseppe Cremonini, he made his professional opera debut in 1889 at the Teatro Politeama in Genoa as Carlo in Donizetti's Linda di Chamounix. The following year he performed the role of Wilhelm Meister in Ambroise Thomas's Mignon at both the Teatro Filodrammatico in Milan and the Teatro Coccia in Novara. In 1891 he appeared as Turiddu in Mascagni's Cavalleria rusticana opposite the famous primadonna Hariclea Darclée as Santuzza at the Romanian National Opera. That same year he had success as the title hero in Mascagni's L'amico Fritz at the opera's premieres in Mantua, Faenza and Palermo. In 1892 he made his Covent Garden debut as Nadir in Bizet's Les pêcheurs de perles and appeared as Alfredo in Verdi's La traviata with the company.

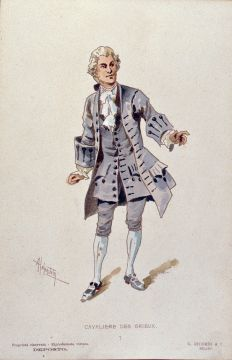
Cremonini's costume for Act II of Manon Lescaut, designed by Adolf Hohenstein for the world premiere

On 1 February 1893, Cremonini created the role of Chevalier des Grieux in the world premiere of Puccini's Manon Lescaut at the Teatro Regio di Torino. It was the first time of many that he would sing opposite Cesira Ferrani, who created the role of Manon. In 1894 Cremonini and Ferrani reprised their roles at Manon Lescaut's La Scala premiere and sang opposite each other in the world premiere of Alberto Franchetti's Il fior d'Alpe as Paolo and Maria.

In addition to Manon Lescaut, Cremonini also appeared in operas at the Teatro Colón in Buenos Aires, Teatro Costanzi in Rome, and at the Teatro Real in Madrid in 1893 and 1894. His performances included such roles as Turiddu, the Assad in Goldmark's Die Königin von Saba, and the title role in Wagner's Lohengrin among others. He created the title role of Pietro Vallini's Il Voto at the Teatro Costanzi in 1894.

In 1895 Cremonini sang in numerous roles with Opéra de Monte-Carlo including Turiddu, Amico Fritz, Enzo in Ponchielli's La Gioconda, Count Almaviva in Rossini's Il barbiere di Siviglia, and Arturo in Bellini's I puritani. In 1896 he sang several roles at Covent Garden including Turiddu, Don Ottavio in Mozart's Don Giovanni, Lyonel in Flotow's Martha, Gennaro in Lucrezia Borgia, Edgardo in Donizetti's Lucia di Lammermoor, the Duke of Mantua in Verdi's Rigoletto, and Faust in Boiti's Mefistofele. The following year he made his debut at the Berlin State Opera as Don Ottavio. Between 1895 and 1897, he also performed as Fernando in Donizetti's La favorita in numerous opera houses throughout Europe.

Cremonini joined the roster of the Metropolitan Opera in 1900 where he sang roles with the company for two seasons. He made his American debut with the company as Cavaradossi in the American premiere of Puccini's Tosca. He later reprised this role in Tosca's premieres in Boston and Chicago. Cremononini's other roles at the Met included Alfredo, Lohengrin, Nadir, Rodolfo in Puccini's La Bohème, Fenton in Verdi's Falstaff, Faust in both Mefistofele in Gounod's Faust among others.

In 1902 he returned to Italy where he appeared as Edgardo in Lucia di Lammermoor, Jean Gaussin in Masenet's Sapho, and Stolzing in Wagner's Die Meistersinger von Nürnberg. His last performance, as des Grieux in Massenet's Manon in his home city of Cremona, was just a few days before his sudden death in 1903.

== Recordings ==
Cremonini's voice is sometimes said to have been recorded in 1900/1 Mapleson Cylinder in recordings of duets from Tosca. However, the Mapleson recordings of Tosca are from 1902 and 1903 (when Cremonini was long gone from the Metropolitan, indeed dead by 1903). The existing recordings (from 1902/1903) are still, however, with soprano Milka Ternina or Emma Eames; but Ternina's tenor partner in 1902 (and Eames' in 1903) was in fact Di Marchi. The earlier performances with Cremonini were not recorded by Mapleson.

Cremonini, unlike other important tenors at the time (such as De Lucia, Caruso, Tamagno, et al.) did not record commercially (if at all) in 1902/03. He is therefore, along with Di Marchi, one of the greatest "losses" of the dawn of "serious" sound recording.

== Sources ==
- Riemens, Leo (1969). A concise biographical dictionary of singers; from the beginning of recorded sound to the present. Chilton Book Co.
- Jullian Budden: "Manon Lescaut (ii)", Grove Music Online ed. L. Macy (Accessed November 15, 2008), (subscription access)
- Biography of Giuseppe Cremonini from Operissimo.com (In German)
