= Pietro Abbà Cornaglia =

Italian organist, concert pianist, and composer

- Born: March 20, 1851; Alessandria
- Died: May 2, 1894 (aged 43)

Pietro Abbà Cornaglia (20 March 1851 – 2 May 1894) was an Italian organist, concert pianist, and composer.

He was born in Alessandria, where he lived his entire life. Cornaglia studied music with his stepfather Pietro Cornaglia before attending the Milan Conservatory from 1868 to 1871 to learn piano and composition. His teachers included Antonio Angeleri and Lauro Rossi.

After graduating, he toured as a concert pianist before becoming the organist for Alessandria's cathedral in 1880, a position he would maintain until his death. There, Cornaglia founded a music school and conducted the cathedral's orchestra.

Cornaglia composed numerous works for piano, organ, and chamber music. He wrote three operas, Isabella Spinola (1877), Maria di Warden (1884) and Una partita a scacchi (1892), none of which were successful, and two books, Sulla introduzione del canto popolare in tutte le masse di comunità, e specialmente nella scuola (1880) and Impressioni d'un viaggio in Germania (1881).
