= Marco Praga =

Italian playwright (1862–1929)

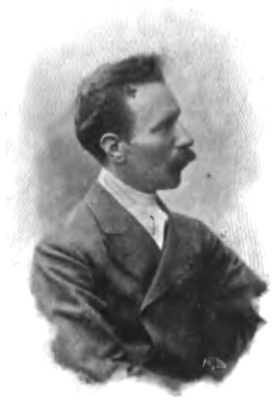
Marco Praga

Marco Praga (born Milan, 20 June 1862; died 31 January 1929) was an Italian playwright popular in his era. His two most successful plays were La vergini and La moglie ideale (1890), which reportedly contained one of Eleonora Duse's great roles. He continued to do notable works until 1915. He collaborated in the preparation of the libretto for Giacomo Puccini's Manon Lescaut.

His father was poet Emilio Praga.
