= Giacomo Orefice =

Italian composer

Giacomo Orefice (1865 – 1922) was an Italian composer.

He was born on 27 August 1865 in Vicenza, which was then part of the Austrian Empire, but was annexed into Italy in the following year. He studied under Alessandro Busi and Luigi Mancinelli at the Liceo Musicale di Bologna, and later became professor of composition at the Milan Conservatory. His students included Andree Aeschlimann Rochat. He died in Milan on 22 December 1922.

His works include:

Operas

- L'oasi (1885)
- Mariska (1889)
- Consuelo (1895, after George Sand's novel; the title role was created by Cesira Ferrani, who the following year created Mimí in Puccini's La bohème)
- Il gladiatore (1898)
- Chopin (1901); Orefice's most successful work in which he incorporated music by Frédéric Chopin, arranged as arias and duets; it depicts a rather fanciful interpretation of some events in Chopin's life and the operatic arrangements are not highly regarded (Scott "Record of Singing" Duckworth Press, 1978). Excerpts recorded by the tenors Amedeo Bassi, Enzo Leliva and others, c. 1903 to 1905. At the time, also performed in Polish.
- Cecilia (1902)
- Mosè (1905)
- Pane altrui (1907)
- Radda (1912, after Maxim Gorky's short story Makar Chudra)
- Il castello del sogno (not produced)

Ballet

- La Soubrette (1907)

Orchestral

- Symphony in D minor
- Sinfonia del bosco
- Anacreontiche (4 movements: Ad Artemide, A Faune, Ad Eros, A Dionisio)

Concertos

- Cello Concerto

Chamber

- Riflessi ed ombre (quintet)
- Piano Trio
- 2 violin sonatas
- Cello sonata

Piano

- Preludi del mare
- Quadri di Böcklin
- Crespuscoli
- Miraggi

Songs

- Various songs.

== Sources ==
- Grove's Dictionary of Music and Musicians, 5th ed., 1954
