= Vicente Sardinero =

Spanish baritone (1937–2002)

Vicente (Vicenç) Sardinero (12 January 1937 – 9 February 2002), né Sardinero-Puerto, was a Spanish operatic lyric baritone. Born in Barcelona, he made his debut at the Gran Teatre del Liceu in his native city in the 1964–65 season, as Escamillo in Carmen. His first appearance at the Teatro alla Scala was in 1967, as Enrico in Lucia di Lammermoor, opposite Renata Scotto, subsequently appearing there in Il trovatore (1978), I due Foscari (1980), and Falstaff (as Ford, conducted by Lorin Maazel, and directed by Giorgio Strehler, 1981). Sardinero also sang at London's Covent Garden (Marcello in La bohème, 1976) and was often heard in zarzuela.

In 1968, he appeared at the New York City Opera, in Il barbiere di Siviglia and Pagliacci. In 1977, Sardinero sang at the Metropolitan Opera, as Marcello in La bohème. His alternating Mimìs were Ileana Cotrubaș, Katia Ricciarelli and Scotto; Dame Josephine Barstow, José Carreras and Justino Díaz were also in the performances, which were conducted by James Levine.

His recordings include L'amico Fritz (with Luciano Pavarotti and Mirella Freni conducted by Gianandrea Gavazzeni, 1968), Manon Lescaut (opposite Montserrat Caballé and Plácido Domingo, 1971), Un giorno di regno (with Jessye Norman, Fiorenza Cossotto, Carreras and Ingvar Wixell, led by Lamberto Gardelli, 1973), La bohème (as Schaunard, with Caballé, Domingo, Sherrill Milnes, Judith Blegen and Ruggero Raimondi conducted by Sir Georg Solti, 1973), Lucia di Lammermoor (opposite Caballé, Carreras and Samuel Ramey, led by Jesús López-Cobos, 1976), Edgar ("live," with Carlo Bergonzi and Scotto, 1977), Roberto Devereux (with Caballé, Carreras, and Susanne Marsee, led by Julius Rudel, 1977) and, again, Manon Lescaut (with Miriam Gauci, 1992).

The baritone died in the village of Villafranca del Castillo, near Madrid, in his sixty-fifth year.

== Videography ==
- Massenet: Werther (Scotto, Kraus; Guingal, de Tomasi, 1987) [live] Bel Canto Society
