= La forza del destino =

Opera by Giuseppe Verdi

- Opera by Giuseppe Verdi
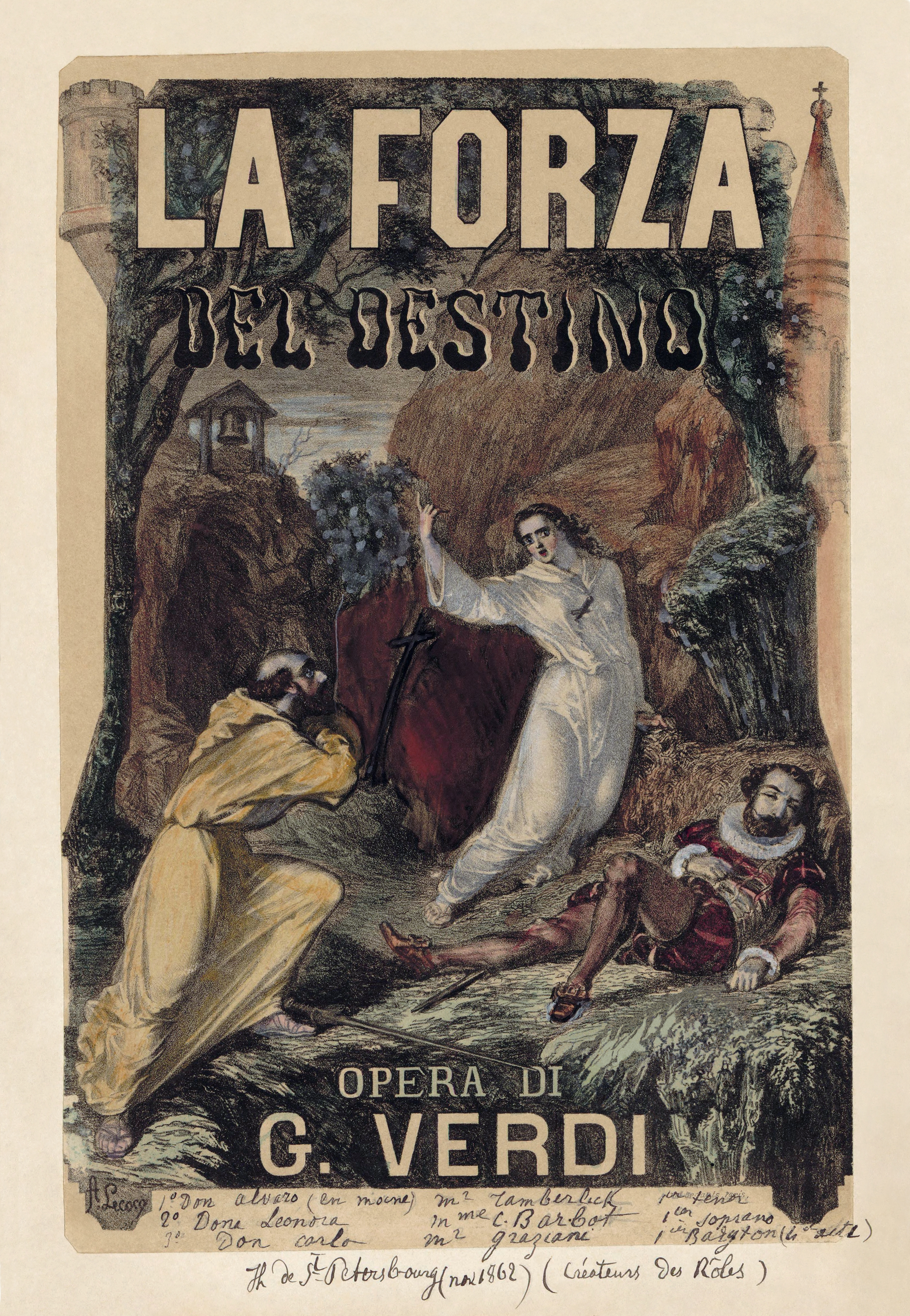
- c. 1870 poster by Charles Lecocq
- Librettist: Francesco Maria Piave
- Language: Italian
- Based on: Ángel de Saavedra's; Don Álvaro o la fuerza del sino of 1835
- Premiere: 10 November 1862 N.S. Bolshoi Kamenny Theatre, Saint Petersburg

La forza del destino (Italian pronunciation: [la ˈfɔrtsa del deˈstiːno]; The Power of Fate, often translated as The Force of Destiny) is an Italian opera by Giuseppe Verdi. The libretto was written by Francesco Maria Piave based on a Spanish drama, Don Álvaro o la fuerza del sino (1835), by Ángel de Saavedra, 3rd Duke of Rivas, with a scene adapted from Friedrich Schiller's Wallensteins Lager (Wallenstein's Camp). It was first performed in the Bolshoi Kamenny Theatre of Saint Petersburg, Russia, on 29 October 1862 O.S. (N.S. 10 November).

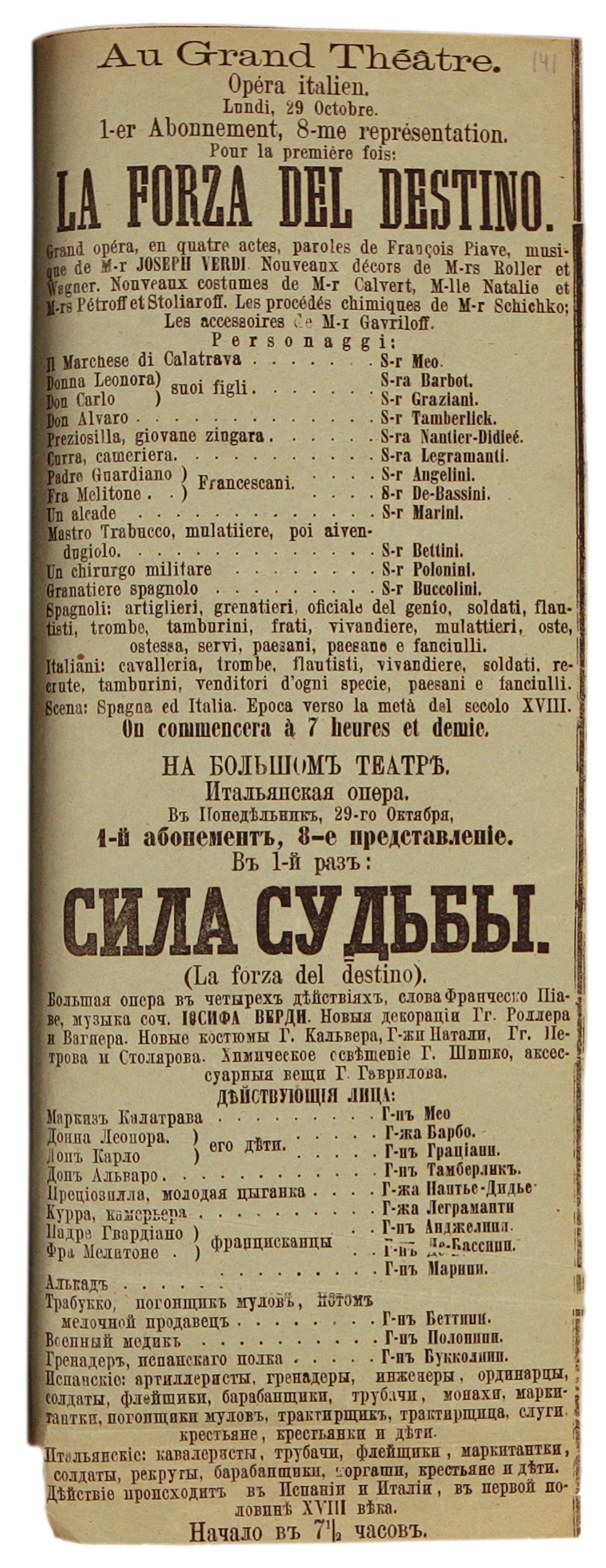
Poster of the Premiere at Bolshoi Kamenny Theatre, Saint Petersburg on 10 November 1862 (N.S.) (O.S. 29 October 1862)

La forza del destino is frequently performed, and there have been a number of complete recordings. In addition, the overture (to the revised version of the opera) is part of the standard repertoire for orchestras, often played as the opening piece at concerts.

== Performance history ==
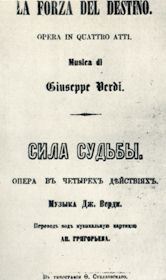
First edition (1862) of the libretto of La forza del destino, Saint Petersburg, with bilingual Italian and Russian text

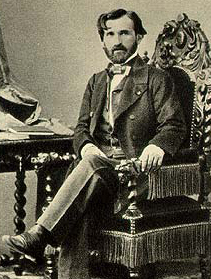
Verdi in 1859

=== Revisions ===
After its premiere in Russia, La forza underwent some revisions and made its debut abroad with performances in Rome in 1863 under the title Don Alvaro. Performances followed in Madrid (with the Duke of Rivas, the play's author, in attendance) and the opera subsequently travelled to New York, Vienna (1865), Buenos Aires (1866), London (1867) and Mexico City (1867).

Following these productions, Verdi made further, more extensive revisions to the opera with additions to the libretto by Antonio Ghislanzoni. This version, which premiered at La Scala, Milan, on 27 February 1869, has become the standard performance version. The most important changes were a new overture (replacing a brief prelude); the addition of a final scene to act 3, following the duel between Carlo and Alvaro; and a new ending, in which Alvaro remains alive, instead of throwing himself off a cliff to his death. The opera in this version is frequently performed in the world's opera houses today.

=== Recent critical editions ===
Critical editions of all versions of the opera (including material from the original 1861 score) have been prepared by musicologist Philip Gossett of the University of Chicago.

In November 2005, the critical edition of the 1869 version was first performed by the San Francisco Opera whose program book included an essay by Gossett on the evolution of the various versions: "La forza del destino: Three States of One Opera". The Caramoor International Music Festival gave a concert performance of the critical edition of the 1862 version, plus never-performed vocal pieces from the 1861 version, in July 2008.

== Roles ==
Role	Voice type	Premiere cast 10 November 1862 St. Petersburg Conductor: Edoardo Bauer (Baveri)	Revised version 27 February 1869 Milan Conductor: Eugenio Terziani
Il Marchese di Calatrava	bass	Meo	Giuseppe Vecchi
Leonora, his daughter	soprano	Caroline Barbot	Teresa Stolz
Don Carlo di Vargas, his son	baritone	Francesco Graziani	Luigi Colonnese
Don Alvaro, Leonora's suitor	tenor	Enrico Tamberlik	Mario Tiberini
Preziosilla, a young gypsy	mezzo-soprano/contralto	Constance Nantier-Didiée	Ida Benza-Nagy
Curra, Leonora's maid	mezzo-soprano	Lagramante	Ester Neri
Mayor	bass	Ignazio Marini	Luigi Alessandrini
Maestro Trabuco, a muleteer and peddler	tenor	Geremia Bettini	Antonio Tasso
Il Padre Guardiano (The Father Superior), a Franciscan	bass	Gian Francesco Angelini	Marcel Junca
Fra Melitone, a Franciscan	baritone	Achille De Bassini	Giacomo Rota
A surgeon	bass	Alessandro Polonini	Vincenzo Paraboschi
Peasants, servants, pilgrims, soldiers, vivandières and friars

== Synopsis ==
Place: Spain and Italy
Time: around 1750

Francesco Maria Piave, librettist of the opera

=== Overture ===
Overture
The overture, performed by the NBC Symphony Orchestra, conducted by Arturo Toscanini

The music begins with the opera's "Fate" motif, an ominous three note E unison in the brass.

=== Act 1 ===
The mansion of Leonora's family, in Seville

Don Alvaro, a young nobleman from South America (presumably Peru), has settled in Seville, Spain, where he is looked down on by many because of his Inca background. There, he and Donna Leonora, the daughter of the haughty Marchese di Calatrava, have fallen in love. But her father the Marchese violently opposes a match he feels is dishonorable and beneath her, believing her to have been seduced. Notwithstanding her tender regard for her father, who until now has always been kind to her, Leonora is ready to give up family and country in order to elope with Alvaro. Aided by her confidante, Curra (Me pellegrina ed orfana – "Exiled and orphaned far from my childhood home"), she prepares to leave.

When Alvaro arrives to fetch her, however, Leonora hesitates, begging for one last day with her father. Alvaro, stunned, releases her from their engagement, saying that she cannot love him as much as he loves her. Leonora then relents and they agree to escape as planned. At that moment the Marchese suddenly enters and discovers the couple together. Assuming the worst, he draws his weapons and threatens the young man with death. To remove any suspicion as to Leonora's purity, Alvaro surrenders himself. As he flings down his pistol, it goes off, mortally wounding the Marchese, who dies, uttering a curse on his daughter. The horrified lovers rush out of the room.

=== Act 2 ===
Scene 1: An inn in the village of Hornachuelos

About a year has passed since the death of the Marchese di Calatrava. In their flight, Leonora and Alvaro were separated and have lost track of each other, unable to reunite or learn of each other's whereabouts.

The act opens in the crowded dining room of an inn, where the guests include the alcalde (town mayor) and several muleteers among others gathered in the dining room as dinner is about to be served. Leonora's brother Don Carlo di Vargas then enters, bent on avenging the family honor and the death of his father. Carlo has disguised himself as a student from Salamanca by the name of Pereda. During the supper, Preziosilla, a pretty gypsy fortune teller, joins them and sings a song urging them to enlist in the army (Al suon del tamburo – "When side drums rattle") for Italy's freedom. (Note: The actual war referred to – the War of Austrian Succession – could hardly be described as "a war for Italy's freedom"; the reference is anachronistic, reflecting the struggle for Italian Unification taking place at the time when the opera was written.) Leonora arrives in male attire accompanied by Trabuco, a muleteer, on their way to a Franciscan monastery where Leonora plans to seek refuge. Recognizing her brother, who she knows wants to kill her, she hides. Carlo grills Trabuco about the identity of his traveling companion, but the company lets him know they don't like his prying questions. They turn the tables by asking Carlo who he is. He claims to be a University student helping a friend track down the friend's sister and her seducer, who, he claims has returned to his native America (Son Pereda son ricco d'onore – "I am Pereda, of honorable descent"). The gypsy girl laughs and says she doesn't believe this story. Overhearing this, Leonora realizes that Alvaro is still alive. She concludes he has betrayed and abandoned her, and she slips away without being discovered.

Scene 2: A monastery nearby

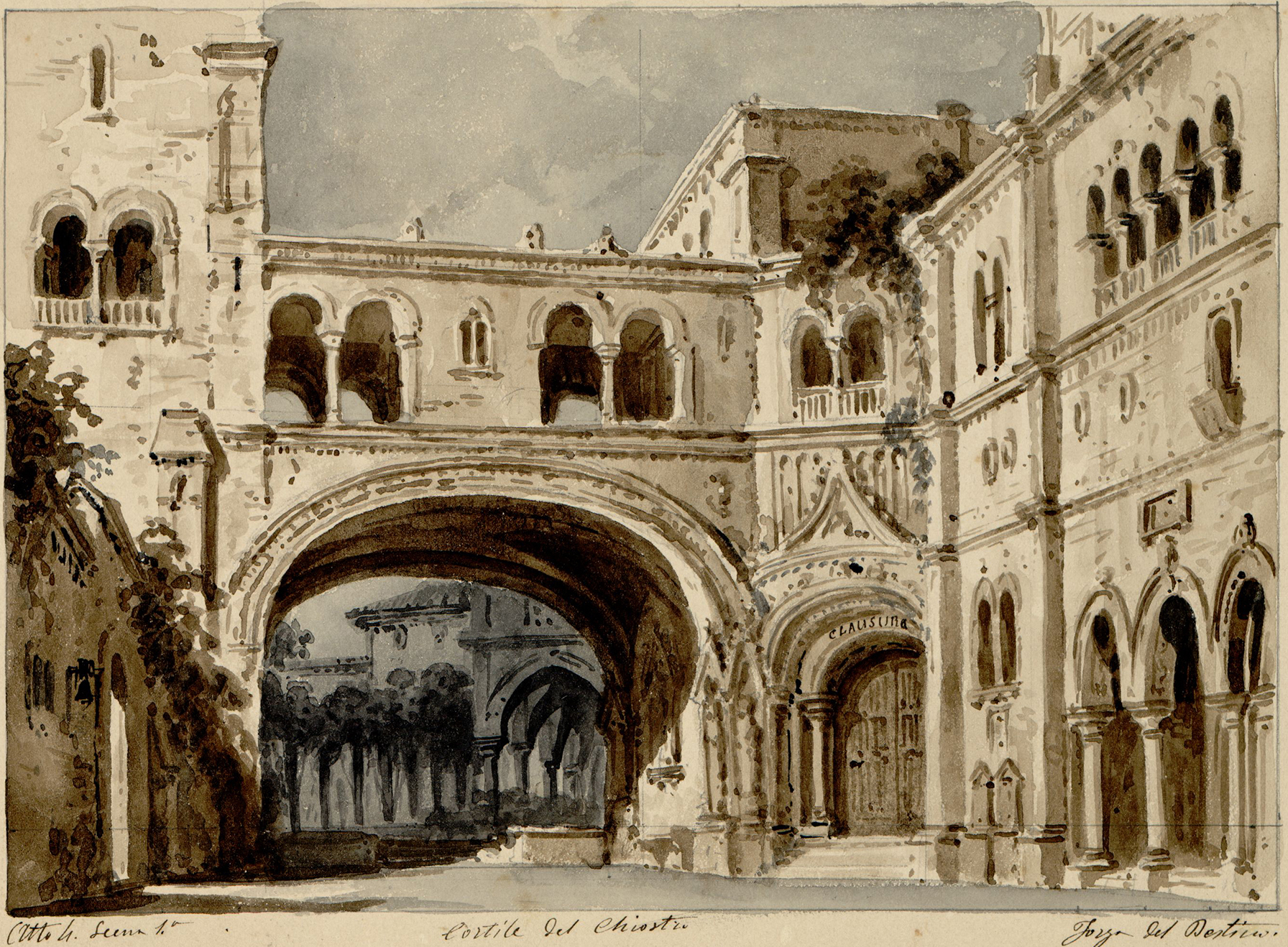
Set design for Act 2 Secene 2 by Carlo Ferrario for La forza del destino (Milan 1869)

Outside the monastery of the Madonna of Angels, Leonora, seeking sanctuary and solitary atonement, has come to take refuge in the monastery intending to live the rest of her life as a hermit (Son giunta! Grazie, o Dio! Estremo asil quest'è per me! ... Madre, pietosa Vergine, – "I've arrived! Thank heaven! My last resort and hope"... "Mother, merciful Virgin".) After a somewhat surly reception by Fra Melitone, she tells the abbot, Padre Guardiano, her true name and her wish to spend the remainder of her life in the monastery's hermitage. The abbot recounts the trials she will have to undergo. Padre Guardiano agrees to direct her to a secret cave in the mountains, where he alone will bring her food and where she will find a bell which she is to ring only in times of great danger or if she is on the point of death. Leonora, Padre Guardiano, Fra Melitone, and the other monks join in prayer as she is formally accepted as tenant of the hermitage.

=== Act 3 ===
Scene 1: A forest near Velletri, in Italy

Meanwhile, Alvaro, believing Leonora to be dead, has joined the Spanish army under the name of Don Federico Herreros and has distinguished himself for bravery (La vita è inferno all'infelice ... O tu che in seno agli angeli – "Life is a hell to an unhappy man." ... "Oh, you who dwell with the angels"). He is interrupted by cries for help and rescues a man from two assassins. It is Don Carlo, who has newly joined the same regiment, also under an assumed name: Don Felice de Bornos. The two become friends and march off side by side to fight in the Battle of Velletri, a historical event which occurred in 1744.

Scene 2: The officers' quarters

Alvaro is brought into the officers' quarters, gravely wounded in the chest. As he is seemingly about to die, he entrusts the key to a casket to his friend "Don Felice" (Carlo). The box contains a packet of letters, which Alvaro says contain a secret. He makes his friend swear to burn them without reading them: (Solenne in quest'ora – "Swear to me in this solemn hour"). Felice/Carlo assures Alvaro that he won't die and that he will be decorated with the Order of Calatrava for his bravery. At the name Calatrava Alvaro shudders and exclaims, "Never!". Carlo is taken aback. He is afraid that "Don Federico" (Alvaro) may be the mysterious seducer who killed his father. He resolves to look at the letters to settle his doubts. (Morir! Tremenda cosa! ... Urna fatale del mio destino – "To die! An immense thing... Begone, fatal vessel of my destiny!"). As his wounded friend is taken away on the surgeon's stretcher, he opens the casket, finds his sister's portrait, and realizes Alvaro's true identity. At that moment a surgeon brings word that Don Alvaro may recover. Don Carlo exults at the prospect of avenging his father's death.

"Nè gustare m'è dato un'ora..."
Opening of act 3, scene 3; Enrico Caruso and Giuseppe De Luca

Scene 3: A camp near the battleground

Having recovered, Alvaro is confronted by Carlo. They begin to duel, but are separated by a passing patrol. As they restrain Carlo, the anguished Don Alvaro vows to enter a monastery.

The soldiers gather. Trabucco, the peddler, tries to sell them his wares; Fra Melitone chastises them for their godless ways; and Preziosilla leads them in a chorus in praise of the military life (Rataplan, rataplan, della gloria – "Rum-tum-tum on the drum is the music that makes a soldier's martial spirit rise").

=== Act 4 ===
Scene 1: The monastery

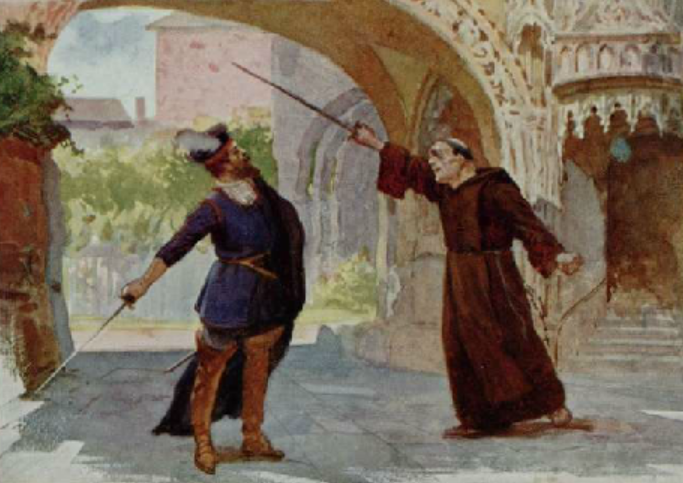
1860s postcard showing act 4

Impoverished peasants from the region approach Fra Melitone at the monastery at Hornachuelos for food and Padre Guardiano gently scolds Melitone for his less than charitable behavior towards them. Don Carlo then approaches, having learned of the presence of Don Alvaro there. Under the name of Father Raphael, Alvaro has indeed entered the monastery, near which is Leonora's cave. Alvaro offers peace, but when Carlo taunts him as a half-breed Alvaro takes up the challenge and the two rush from the monastery. (Le minacce, i fieri accenti – "May the winds carry off with them").

Scene 2: A desolate spot near Leonora's hermitage

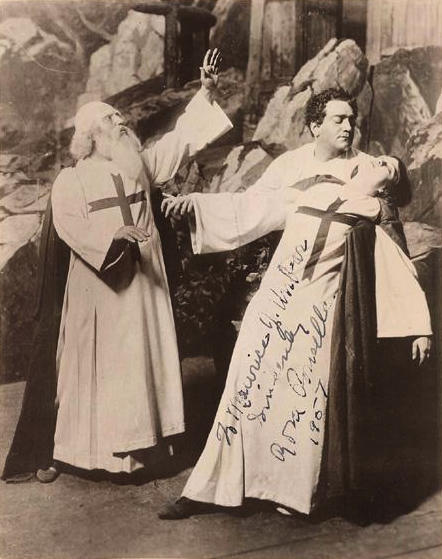
Jose Mardones, Enrico Caruso and Rosa Ponselle in a 1918 Metropolitan Opera performance

Leonora, longing for the peaceful release of death, restates her love for Alvaro and begs God for peace. (Pace, pace, mio Dio! – "Peace, O mighty Father, give me peace!"). The duel between the two men spills over onto the neighboring crags in the vicinity of Leonora's isolation. Upon hearing the clashing of swords she takes refuge in her cave. Carlo is mortally wounded by Alvaro, who invades the hermit's sanctuary to request the last offices for the dying man. Leonora and Alvaro recognize each other. Alvaro tells her of what has happened, and she rushes to embrace her dying brother. As she bends over him, he stabs her in the heart. The Father Superior, who has come in answer to Leonora's alarm bell, orders Alvaro to stop cursing fate and to humble himself before God. The dying Leonora joins him in this plea, and Alvaro declaims that he is now redeemed.

[Original version: Overcome by the guilt of having killed or caused the death of all the Calatravas, Alvaro jumps to his death into the nearby ravine, cursing humankind, over the protests of Father Guardiano].

== Instrumentation ==
Woodwinds:

2 flutes (2nd doubling piccolo)
2 oboes
2 clarinets (2nd doubling bass clarinet)
2 bassoons

Brass:

4 horns
2 trumpets
3 trombones
cimbasso

Percussion:

timpani
side drum
cymbals
bass drum

Strings:

2 harps
violins I, II
violas
cellos
double basses

Onstage:

organ
6 trumpets
4 side drums.

== Superstition ==
Over the years La forza has acquired a reputation for being cursed, following some unfortunate incidents. In 1960 at the Metropolitan Opera, the noted baritone Leonard Warren collapsed and died during a performance of the opera. The supposed curse reportedly kept Luciano Pavarotti from ever performing the opera, and the tenor Franco Corelli used to follow small rituals during performances to avoid bad luck.

== Other media ==
The main theme in the musical scores for the films Jean de Florette and Manon des Sources (both 1986) was adapted by Jean-Claude Petit from the duet "Invano, Alvaro" in La forza del destino. The Korean film The Scarlet Letter (2004) opens with "Pace, pace mio Dio", introducing a film about intensely powerful obsession which brings its lovers to the brink of madness. La forza del destino also plays a thematic role in the novel series A Series of Unfortunate Events (1999–2006).

== Recordings ==
Noted recordings include the 1953 performance in Florence with Renata Tebaldi, Mario del Monaco, Aldo Protti, and Cesare Siepi; as well as the legendary 1958 Naples performance with Renata Tebaldi, Franco Corelli, Ettore Bastianini, and Boris Christoff.
