= Aeschlimann =

Aeschlimann is a Swiss German surname. Notable people with the surname include:

- Charles Aeschlimann (1897–1952), Swiss tennis player
- Erhard Aeschlimann, husband of Swiss composer Andree Rochat (1900–1990)
- Georges Aeschlimann (1920–2010), Swiss cyclist
- Jean-Jacques Aeschlimann (born 1967), Swiss ice hockey player
- Karl Eduard Aeschlimann (1808–1893), Swiss architect
- Manuel Aeschlimann (born 1964), French politician
- Martin Aeschlimann (born 1957), German physicist
- Peter Aeschlimann (born 1946), Swiss ice hockey player
- Roger Aeschlimann (1923–2008), Swiss cyclist
