= Cesira Ferrani =

Italian operatic soprano (1863–1943)

Ferrani as Manon Lescaut

Cesira Ferrani (8 May 1863 in Turin – 4 May 1943 in Pollone) was an Italian operatic lyric soprano who is best known for debuting two of the most iconic roles in opera history, Mimì in the original 1896 production of Giacomo Puccini's La bohème and the title role in Puccini's Manon Lescaut in its 1893 world premiere. Ferrani sang a wide repertoire that encompassed not only verismo opera but the works of composers like Verdi, Gounod, Wagner, and Debussy.

== Career ==
Born Cesira Zanazzio, Ferrani studied with Antonietta Fricci in Turin before making her professional opera début in 1887 as Micaëla in Bizet's Carmen at the Teatro Regio di Torino. That same year she sang Gilda from Verdi's Rigoletto and Marguerite in Gounod's Faust at the same theater. Over the next four years she appeared in numerous productions in Catania, Genoa, and Venice. She also sang in several productions in France. In 1892 she appeared at the Teatro Carlo Felice as Amelia into Verdi's Simon Boccanegra and as the title role in Alfredo Catalani's Loreley under Arturo Toscanini.

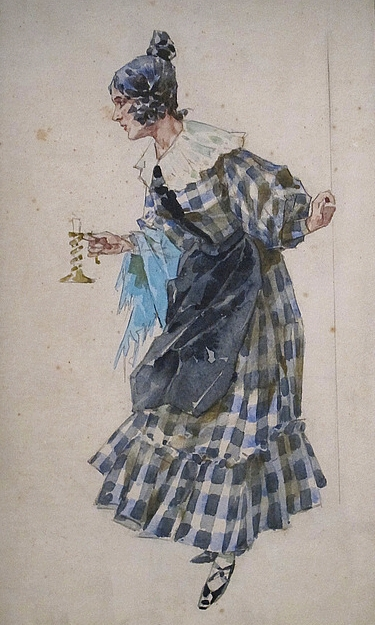
Ferrani's costume for Act I of La bohème designed by Adolfo Hohenstein for the world premiere (1893)

On 1 February 1893, Ferrani sang the title role in the world premiere of Puccini's Manon Lescaut at the Teatro Regio di Torino. It was the first time of many that she would sing opposite Giuseppe Cremonini, who originated the role of Chevalier des Grieux. In 1894 Ferrani and Cremonini reprised their roles in Manon Lescaut's La Scala premiere and sang opposite each other in the world premiere of Alberto Franchetti's Il fior d'Alpe as Maria and Paolo. Ferrani later reprised the role of Manon in productions at the Teatro Colón in Buenos Aires and cities throughout Italy.

In 1895 Ferrani sang the role of Suzel in L'amico Fritz at the Opéra de Monte-Carlo and created the title role in the world premiere of Giacomo Orefice's Consuelo at the Teatro Comunale di Bologna. The following year she portrayed the role of Mimì in the original production of Puccini's La bohème in Turin (1896). The day after the successful premiere of La bohème, with the cast receiving 15 curtain calls, Puccini gave Ferrani his photograph with the dedication:

"To my true and splendid Mimì, signorina Cesira Ferrani, with gratitude, G. Puccini"

Following the success of La bohème, Ferrani embarked on performance tours of Russia and Spain, and appeared in productions in Cairo and Lisbon in addition to continuing to perform throughout Italy. In 1901 Ferrani sang in the world premiere of Mascagni's Le maschere at the Teatro Carlo Felice in Genoa.

At La Scala she sang Mélisande in the first Milan performance of Pelléas et Mélisande with Toscanini in 1908. Her other roles included Juliette from Roméo et Juliette, Fanny in Sapho, Charlotte from Werther, Amelia from Simon Boccanegra, Elisabeth in Tannhäuser, and both Elsa in Lohengrin and Eva in Die Meistersinger among others. Her final appearance was in 1909 as Mélisande.

In 1928 when the first recording of Puccini's Madama Butterfly was made, the Gramophone Company invited her out of retirement to sing Kate Pinkerton's handful of lines in Act 3.
