= Ian Charleson =

Scottish actor (1949–1990)

- Charleson as Eric Liddell in Chariots of Fire
- Born: 11 August 1949; Edinburgh, Scotland
- Died: 6 January 1990 (aged 40); London, England
- Education: University of Edinburgh (MA); London Academy of Music and Dramatic Art
- Occupations: Actor, singer
- Years active: 1972–1989

Ian Charleson (11 August 1949 – 6 January 1990) was a Scottish stage and screen actor. He starred as Olympic athlete and missionary Eric Liddell in the Oscar-winning 1981 film Chariots of Fire, and played Charlie Andrews in the 1982 Oscar-winning film Gandhi.

Charleson performed on the British stage as well, with critically acclaimed leads in Guys and Dolls, Cat on a Hot Tin Roof, Fool for Love, and Hamlet, among many others.

Charleson was diagnosed with HIV in 1986, and died in 1990 at the age of 40. He requested that it be announced after his death that he had died of AIDS, to publicise the condition. His was the first celebrity death in the United Kingdom openly attributed to AIDS, and the announcement helped to promote awareness and acceptance of the disease.

Charleson performed numerous Shakespearean roles, and in 1991 the annual Ian Charleson Awards were established, particularly in honour of his final Hamlet; the awards reward the best classical stage performances in Britain by actors aged under 30. The 2026 film Elsinore depicts Charleson's life, his challenging last months, and his final portrayal of Hamlet, with Andrew Scott playing Charleson.

== Early life and education ==
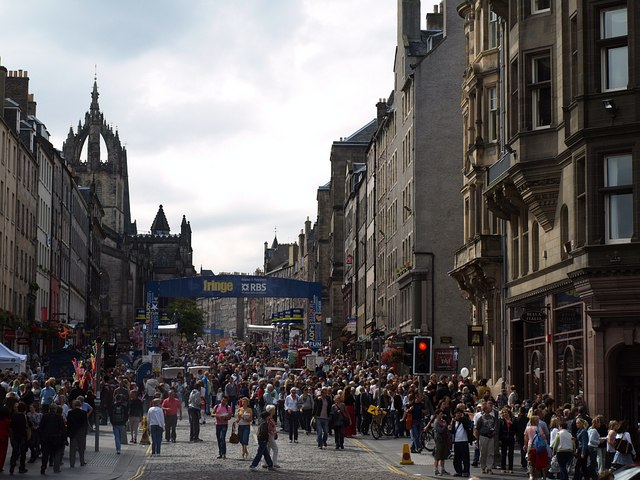
Charleson performed often at the Edinburgh Festival and Fringe from 1967 to 1973.

Born in Edinburgh in 1949, Charleson was the son of a printer, and grew up in a working-class area of the city. A bright, musical, artistic child, by the age of eight he was performing in local theatre productions.

He won a scholarship to and attended Edinburgh's Royal High School. In his teens, he joined and performed with The Jasons, an Edinburgh amateur theatrical group. He also sang solo as a boy soprano in church and in the Royal High School choir, which performed on the radio and in Edinburgh Festival concerts.

Charleson won a scholarship to the University of Edinburgh, which he attended from 1967 to 1970, obtaining a three-year Scottish MA Ordinary degree. Initially he studied architecture. However, he spent most of his time acting with the student-run Edinburgh University Drama Society, and decided to pursue acting as a career. He changed his study concentration accordingly, and graduated with a degree in English, fine art, and mathematics. In addition to his acting roles at Edinburgh University, he also directed many plays there, and he designed costumes for several as well.

From 1967 to 1973, Charleson also performed often at the Edinburgh Festival and Edinburgh Festival Fringe, becoming a noted actor in those circles.

== Stage career ==
=== LAMDA, Young Vic, and Cambridge Theatre Company ===
After graduating in 1970 from the University of Edinburgh – where he played leads in numerous productions, including several Shakespeare plays – Charleson won a place in the London Academy of Music and Dramatic Art (LAMDA), where he studied for two years.

From LAMDA, Charleson was hired by Frank Dunlop's Young Vic Theatre Company. He made his professional stage debut in 1972 with the Young Vic, as one of the ensemble of brothers in Joseph and the Amazing Technicolor Dreamcoat (1972), which was also televised in the UK that same year by Granada Television. In 1973, he starred as Jimmy Porter in Look Back in Anger, and that year he was also Hamlet and later Guildenstern in the first revival of Tom Stoppard's Rosencrantz and Guildenstern Are Dead. Also as part of the Young Vic company, he was Claudio in Much Ado About Nothing in 1974. He traveled with the company to the Brooklyn Academy of Music in New York that same year, to appear as Lucentio in The Taming of the Shrew, Ottavio in Scapino, and Brian Curtis in French Without Tears.

In late 1974, he played the title role in Hamlet with the Cambridge Theatre Company, where he had previously performed that year in The School for Scandal and Six Characters in Search of an Author, and the production went on tour into 1975. His performance of Hamlet garnered good reviews; nevertheless Charleson felt he had not done the notoriously difficult role complete justice.

=== West End and National Theatre debuts, Royal Shakespeare Company ===
Charleson made his West End debut in 1975, in a long-running production of Simon Gray's Otherwise Engaged at the Queen's Theatre. In it he played Dave, a surly Scottish lodger, opposite Alan Bates.

He next appeared at the National Theatre, where he performed Octavius in Julius Caesar in 1977. That year he also played Peregrine in the Ben Jonson play Volpone, opposite John Gielgud, and Captain Phoebus in The Hunchback of Notre-Dame.

Charleson then spent a year in Stratford-upon-Avon with the Royal Shakespeare Company 1978–79. There he performed a hauntingly voiced Ariel in The Tempest; Tranio in The Taming of the Shrew; and Longaville in Love's Labour's Lost opposite Richard Griffiths as the King – all both in Stratford and at the Aldwych Theatre in London. Also with the RSC, he was Lawrence Vail in an acclaimed production of Once in a Lifetime (1979) at the Aldwych Theatre, and he played Pierre in the Jane Lapotaire vehicle Piaf, giving a performance which caught the eye of the filmmakers of Chariots of Fire.

=== National Theatre spotlight ===
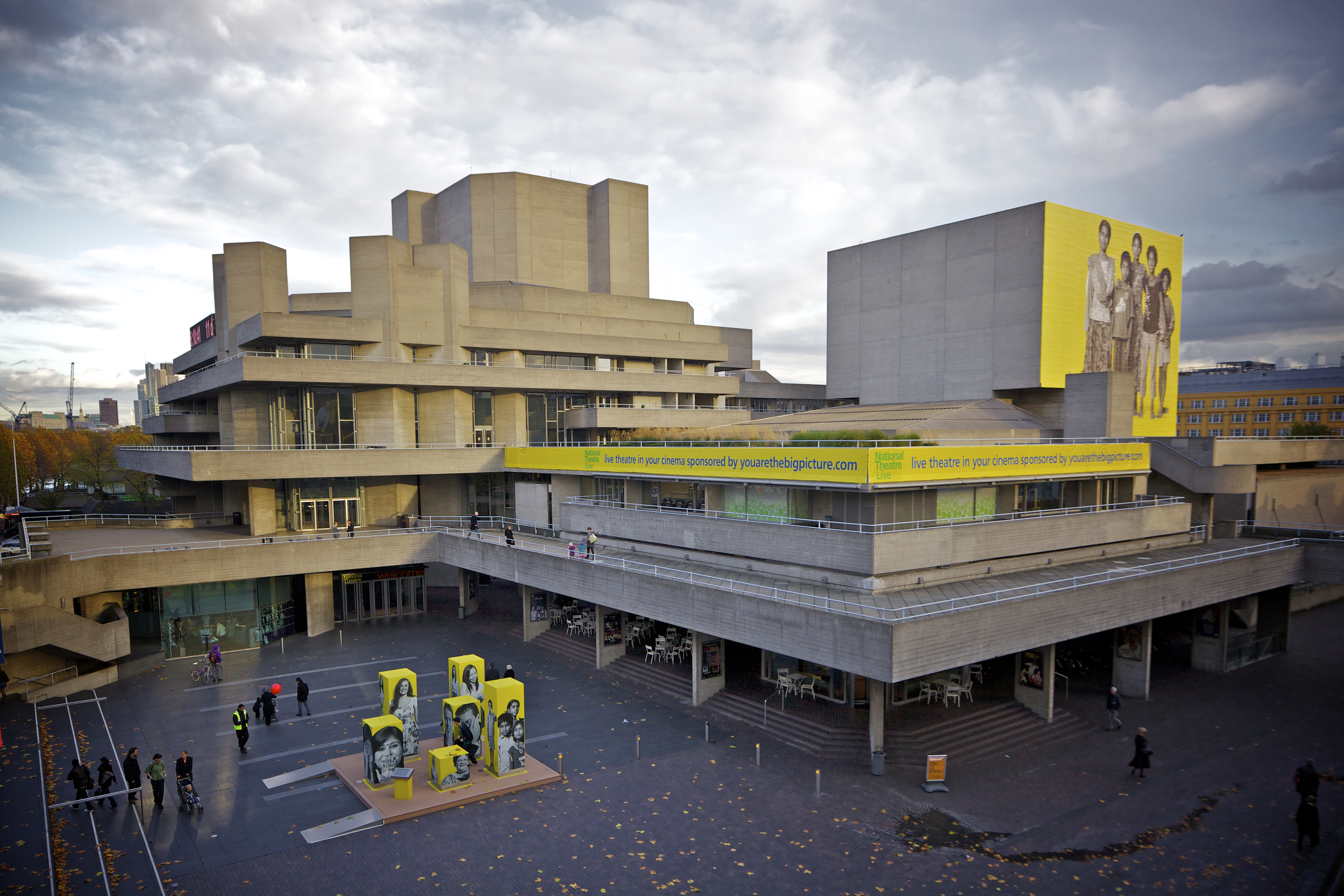
The National Theatre, where Charleson gave some of his most memorable performances

In the 1980s, Charleson won particular critical and popular acclaim for his starring roles at the National Theatre. He was a glowingly reviewed Sky Masterson in Richard Eyre's enormously successful revival of the musical Guys and Dolls (1982), opposite Julie Covington as Sister Sarah, with Bob Hoskins as Nathan Detroit and Julia McKenzie as Adelaide.

He received an Olivier Award nomination for Actor of the Year in a New Play as Eddie in Sam Shepard's gritty and very physical two-person drama, Fool for Love (1984–85), opposite Julie Walters as his on-again off-again love object. And he was a highly praised Brick, the repressed homosexual protagonist in Tennessee Williams' Cat on a Hot Tin Roof (1988), opposite Lindsay Duncan.

=== Final Hamlet ===
While seriously ill from AIDS, for which he was being treated by Dr Margaret Johnson, Charleson performed his second run of Hamlet shortly before his death. Over 17 performances from 9 October to 13 November 1989 this time at the National Theatre he gave a definitive performance which garnered major accolades. Director Richard Eyre, with some initial misgivings based on Charleson's health, had brought him in to replace Daniel Day-Lewis, who had abandoned the production. A further challenge was that Charleson's face was greatly swollen from septicaemia; and as the rehearsals began the cast, crew and public were told that he was recovering from a sinus operation. Partway though the rehearals process he told his fellow actors the truth, with all responding by coming up and giving him a hug or shaking his hand. Fellow actor Paul Jesson recalled that by the end of a performance, "Ian would rely on me literally to support him and by the end of a performance he hardly had the strength to lift the sword."

In a lengthy review praising Charleson's performance, John Peter wrote in the Sunday Times:

[T]he masterful new Hamlet: Ian Charleson. .... Technically he employs clarity combined with a powerful dramatic drive. His delivery is steely but delicate. The words move with sinuous elegance and crackle with fire. His Hamlet is virile and forceful. ... He oozes intelligence from every pore. ... The way Charleson can transform a production is a reminder that actors are alive and well, that directors can only draw a performance from those who have one in them and that in the last analysis the voice of drama speaks to us through actors.

The day following Charleson's final Hamlet performance, when Ian McKellen was given the Evening Standard Award for Best Actor for his Iago in Othello, McKellen offered thanks, but said having seen "the perfect Hamlet" at the National Theatre the previous night, he thought that not he but Charleson was truly the Best Actor of 1989, and he gave Charleson his statuette.

== Film and television ==
=== Chariots of Fire and Gandhi ===
In 1979, producer David Puttnam and director Hugh Hudson had done months of searching for the actor to play the lead of the evangelical Scot Eric Liddell in their upcoming film about the 1924 Olympics. They then saw Charleson performing the role of Pierre in Piaf, and knew immediately they had found their man. Unbeknownst to them, the actor had heard about the film from his father, and desperately wanted to play the part, feeling it would "fit like a kid glove". This mutual affinity led to Charleson's best-known film role and success – as the athlete and missionary Eric Liddell in Chariots of Fire (1981). He prepared for the role by studying the Bible intensively, and he himself wrote Liddell's stirring post-race address to the workingmen's crowd. This film and role made him an international celebrity.

He had a similar success the following year, playing Mahatma Gandhi's closest friend and collaborator, the Anglican priest Charlie Andrews, in Gandhi (1982), opposite Ben Kingsley. Like Chariots of Fire, the film Gandhi won numerous Academy Awards, including Best Picture.

=== Other film work ===
After these two major successes in these two Best Picture Oscar–winning films, Charleson's film career did not, however, follow the same progressive arc that his stage career did. Good feature Hollywood scripts did not pour in after Chariots of Fire and Gandhi; nor did he choose to move to Hollywood to capitalize on his success. Also affecting his film career was the fact that he was diagnosed with HIV in 1986, and thereafter lacked enthusiasm to do feature films, although he was not symptomatic until the autumn of 1988. His drive to pursue a rich stage career focusing on Shakespearean leads, however, remained strong.

Charleson's other feature film roles are: punk-era Angel in his film debut Jubilee (1977) directed by Derek Jarman; Lt. Ryder in the Golden Bear-winning "Irish question" film Ascendancy (1982), which starred Julie Covington; a small role as the abusive drunk Jeffson Brown in Greystoke: The Legend of Tarzan (1984); a comedic turn as Gerald Spong in the rather ill-fated Car Trouble (1985), opposite his friend Julie Walters; and opera director Marco in Dario Argento's horror film Opera (1987).

=== Television: Shakespeare, TV films, and teleplays ===
Charleson performed in three BBC Television Shakespeare films: as Fortinbras in Hamlet (1980) starring Derek Jacobi; the protagonist Bertram in the acclaimed production of All's Well That Ends Well (1981); and Octavius Caesar in Antony & Cleopatra (1981) opposite his frequent co-star Jane Lapotaire as Cleopatra.

His other notable made-for-television film roles include: the titular Lieutenant Dorfrichter in the film adaptation of M. Fagyas's Austro-Hungarian pre-war mystery The Devil's Lieutenant (1984); Rakitin in Turgenev's A Month in the Country (1985) opposite Eleanor Bron; Kyril in the spy thriller Codename: Kyril (1988) opposite Edward Woodward, Richard E. Grant, and Peter Vaughan; and the protagonist Major Brendan Archer in the faithful screen adaptation of J. G. Farrell's Booker Award-winning Troubles (1988), opposite Ian Richardson.

Charleson's notable starring television roles in the 1970s include: Anthony in A Private Matter (1974), his first starring screen role, opposite Rachel Kempson; slick and cruel John Ross preying on Scottish immigrants to the New World in O Canada (1975) in the anthology series Churchill's People; and one of two British soldiers who find military life nearly unbearable in The Paradise Run (1976), directed by Michael Apted.

In the 1980s his notable starring TV roles included: Alexander the Great's close companion Hephaistion in the PBS miniseries The Search for Alexander the Great; serial killer Neville Heath in an episode of the murder-trial reenactment series Ladykillers (1981); naive Scot turned powerful South African magnate Jamie MacGregor in the miniseries Master of the Game (1984); romantic lead Clarence Dandridge in the period miniseries Louisiana (1984) opposite Margot Kidder; and protagonist Victor Geary in the stylish and clever Oxbridge Blues (1984), written by Frederic Raphael, directed by James Cellan Jones, and co-starring Amanda Redman, Rosalyn Landor, and Malcolm Stoddard.

== Singing work ==
Charleson used his tenor singing voice in musicals and other performances. He did notable solo singing work in productions including Much Ado About Nothing (1974), an episode of Rock Follies of '77 (1977), The Tempest (1978–1979), Piaf (1978–1980), Guys and Dolls (1982), A Royal Night of One Hundred Stars (1985), After Aida (1985–1986), Andrew Lloyd Webber's and Tim Rice's Cricket (1986), Sondheim: A Celebration (1988 benefit for Crusaid), and Bent (1989). He also sang classic standards and show tunes, and the songs of Robert Burns, in variety programmes on stage and television.

Three commercial recordings have been issued that include Charleson's singing:

- The National Theatre cast album of Guys and Dolls (1982)
- Charleson singing Ariel's Songs from The Tempest, issued by the Royal Shakespeare Company; music by Guy Woolfenden
- The Original London Cast Album of Joseph and the Amazing Technicolor Dreamcoat (ensemble only)

He also sings a solo ballad on an episode ("The Empire") of the television series Rock Follies of '77.

== Death ==
Charleson, who was gay, was diagnosed with HIV in 1986 during the AIDS epidemic, and died of AIDS-related causes on 6 January 1990 at the age of 40. He died eight weeks after performing the title role in a run of Hamlet, in Richard Eyre's production at the Olivier Theatre. Fellow actor and friend Ian McKellen said that Charleson played Hamlet so well it was as if he had rehearsed the role all his life.

Charleson requested that it be announced after his death that he had died of AIDS, to publicise the condition. This unusual decision by a major internationally known actor, the first show-business death in the United Kingdom openly attributed to complications from AIDS, helped promote awareness of HIV and AIDS and acceptance of AIDS patients.

== Recognition and honours ==
For his performance in Chariots of Fire, Charleson won a Variety Club Showbiz Award for Most Promising Artiste in February 1982.

At the 1984 Laurence Olivier Awards, he was nominated for Actor of the Year in a New Play, for his starring role as Eddie in Fool for Love.

In The Sunday Times, John Peter named Charleson the Best Male Actor of 1989 for his Hamlet, along with Ian McKellen for his Iago in Othello.

The Houghton Mifflin Dictionary of Biography describes Charleson as "a leading player of charm and power" and "one of the finest British actors of his generation". Alan Bates wrote that he was "definitely among the top ten actors of his age group". Ian McKellen said Charleson was "the most unmannered and unactorish of actors: always truthful, always honest".

== Tributes and legacy ==
On 8 April 1990, three months after his Edinburgh funeral, a public memorial service was held for Charleson in London. A recording of his singing of "Come Unto These Yellow Sands" from The Tempest was played.

In 1990, following his death, 20 of Charleson's friends, colleagues, and family members, including Ian McKellen, Alan Bates, Hugh Hudson, Richard Eyre, Sean Mathias, Hilton McRae, Ruby Wax, and David Rintoul, contributed to a book of reminiscences about him, called For Ian Charleson: A Tribute, published in October 1990. All royalties from the sale of the book went to the Ian Charleson Trust, a charitable foundation which operated from 1990 to 2007.

Two emotional reunion performances of Guys and Dolls, with almost all of the original 1982 cast and musicians, were given at the National Theatre in November 1990 as a tribute to Charleson. The tickets sold out immediately, and the dress rehearsal was also packed. The proceeds from the performances were donated to the new HIV clinic at the Royal Free Hospital, and to scholarships in Charleson's name at LAMDA.

In his honour, the annual Ian Charleson Awards were established in 1991, to reward the best classical stage performances in Britain by actors aged under 30, particularly in honour of his final Hamlet.

The Royal Free Hospital's out-patient clinic which was established by Margaret Johnson to treat people with HIV, in London, was renamed the Ian Charleson Day Centre in 1992 in his memory.

Hugh Hudson, who had directed him in Chariots of Fire, dedicated his 1999 film My Life So Far "In loving memory of Ian Charleson". The 2005 videos "Wings on Their Heels: The Making of Chariots of Fire" and "Chariots of Fire: A Reunion" are both also dedicated to his memory.

From 2017 through 2023, Dickie Beau performed his one-man tribute to Charleson's Hamlet, Re-Member Me, in theatres in London and New York.

The 2026 film Elsinore depicts Charleson's life, in particular his final Hamlet and the odds he faced in preparing for and performing it. The film stars Andrew Scott as Charleson and co-stars Olivia Colman as his doctor Margaret Johnson. The screenplay was written by Stephen Beresford, the film was directed by Simon Stone, and produced by StudioCanal.

== Filmography ==
Year	Title	Role	Notes
1972	Joseph and the Amazing Technicolor Dreamcoat	Gad	Televised stage musical, ensemble role
1973	Hopcraft into Europe	Guillaume	TV play (ITV Sunday Night Theatre), main cast
1974	A Private Matter (ITV Sunday Night Theatre)	Anthony Black-Mathieson	TV play, starring role
1974	Intimate Strangers	Tom Anson	TV series (2 episodes), small role
1975	O Canada	John Ross	TV play (in the anthology series Churchill's People), leading role
1976	The Paradise Run	Henry	TV movie, leading role
1977	Rock Follies of '77	Jimmy Smiles	TV series; episode: "The Empire", singing role
1978	Jubilee	Angel	Feature film, supporting role
1980	Hamlet, Prince of Denmark	Fortinbras	BBC Television Shakespeare
1981	All's Well that Ends Well	Bertram	BBC Television Shakespeare, lead role
1981	Chariots of Fire	Eric Liddell	Feature film, starring role, film won the Academy Award for Best Picture
1981	The Search for Alexander the Great	Hephaistion	TV mini-series, supporting role
1981	Antony & Cleopatra	Octavius Caesar	BBC Television Shakespeare
1981	Ladykillers	Neville Heath	TV series (murder trial reenactment) ep: "Make It a Double", starring role
1982	ITV Playhouse: Something's Got to Give	Ian Arthur	TV play, lead role
1982	Gandhi	Charlie Andrews	Feature film, main cast, film won the Academy Award for Best Picture
1983	Ascendancy	Lt. Ryder	Feature film, supporting role, film won the Golden Bear Award
1983	Reilly: Ace of Spies	Lockhart	TV miniseries (3 episodes), small role
1984	The Devil's Lieutenant	Lt. Dorfrichter	TV movie, title role
1984	Master of the Game	Jamie McGregor	TV mini-series, leading role
1984	Greystoke: The Legend of Tarzan, Lord of the Apes	Jeffson Brown	Feature film, small role
1984	Scotland's Story	Prince Charles Edward Stewart	TV mini-series, small role
1984	Louisiana	Clarence Dandridge	TV mini-series, leading role
1984	Oxbridge Blues	Victor Geary	TV play, ep. "Oxbridge Blues", starring role
1984	The Sun Also Rises	Mike Campbell	TV movie, small role
1985	Royal Night of 100 Stars	Himself	Singing performance, "You're Just in Love"
1985	A Month in the Country	Rakitin	TV movie, leading role
1986	Car Trouble	Gerald Spong	Feature film, leading role
1987	Opera	Marco	Feature film, main cast
1988	Codename: Kyril	Kyril	TV movie, title role
1988	Troubles	Maj. Brendan Archer	TV movie, starring role

== Major theatre credits ==
Year	Title	Role	Director	Playwright	Theatre
1972	Bible One, Part I: The Genesis Mediaeval Mystery Plays: The Creation to Jacob	Angels / Noah's son	Frank Dunlop	Frank Dunlop (adapter)	Young Vic Theatre Company at the Edinburgh International Festival; Young Vic Theatre; The Roundhouse
1972	Joseph and the Amazing; Technicolor Dreamcoat	Gad	Frank Dunlop	Andrew Lloyd Webber; Tim Rice	Young Vic Theatre Company at the Edinburgh Festival; Young Vic Theatre; The Roundhouse
1972	The Comedy of Errors	Police Officer / Singer	Frank Dunlop	Shakespeare	Young Vic Theatre Company at the Edinburgh Festival; Young Vic Theatre
1973	Look Back in Anger	Jimmy Porter	Bernard Goss	John Osborne	Young Vic Theatre
1973	Hobson's Choice	Freddy Beenstock	Bernard Goss	Harold Brighouse	Young Vic Theatre
1973–74	Rosencrantz and Guildenstern; Are Dead	Hamlet; Guildenstern	Bernard Goss	Tom Stoppard	Young Vic Theatre
1974	Much Ado About Nothing	Claudio	Frank Dunlop	Shakespeare	Young Vic Theatre
1974	The Taming of the Shrew	Lucentio	Frank Dunlop	Shakespeare	Young Vic Theatre Company at the Brooklyn Academy of Music, New York
1974	Scapino	Ottavio	Frank Dunlop	Molière; Frank Dunlop	Young Vic Theatre Company at the Brooklyn Academy of Music, New York
1974	French Without Tears	Brian Curtis	Frank Dunlop	Terence Rattigan	Young Vic Theatre Company at the Brooklyn Academy of Music, New York
1974	The School for Scandal	Moses	Robert Lang	Richard Brinsley Sheridan	Cambridge Theatre Company (touring)
1974	Six Characters in Search of an Author	Member of the Acting Company	Richard Cottrell	Pirandello	Cambridge Theatre Company (touring)
1974–75	Hamlet	Hamlet	Richard Cottrell	Shakespeare	Cambridge Theatre Company (touring)
1975–76	Otherwise Engaged	Dave	Harold Pinter	Simon Gray	Oxford Playhouse; Richmond Theatre; Queen's Theatre
1977	Julius Caesar	Octavius	John Schlesinger	Shakespeare	National Theatre (Olivier Theatre)
1977	Volpone	Peregrine	Peter Hall	Ben Jonson	National Theatre (Olivier Theatre)
1977	The Hunchback of Notre-Dame	Captain Phoebus	Michael Bogdanov	Ken Hill	National Theatre (Cottlesloe Theatre)
1978–1979	The Tempest	Ariel	Clifford Williams	Shakespeare	Royal Shakespeare Company, Stratford-upon-Avon; Aldwych Theatre, London
1978–1979	The Taming of the Shrew	Tranio	Michael Bogdanov	Shakespeare	Royal Shakespeare Company, Stratford-upon-Avon; Aldwych Theatre, London
1978–1979	Love's Labour's Lost	Longaville	John Barton	Shakespeare	Royal Shakespeare Company, Stratford-upon-Avon; Aldwych Theatre, London
1978–1980	Piaf	Man at rehearsal / Pierre	Howard Davies	Pam Gems	The Other Place, Stratford-upon-Avon; Gulbenkian Studio, Newcastle; Warehouse Theatre, London; Aldwych Theatre, London; Wyndham's Theatre, London
1979	Once in a Lifetime	Lawrence Vail	Trevor Nunn	Moss Hart; George Kaufman	Royal Shakespeare Company at the Aldwych Theatre
1979	The Innocent	Joe Maguire	Howard Davies	Tom McGrath	Warehouse Theatre
1982	Guys and Dolls	Sky Masterson	Richard Eyre	Frank Loesser; Abe Burrows; Damon Runyon	National Theatre (Olivier Theatre)
1984–85	Fool for Love	Eddie	Peter Gill	Sam Shepard	National Theatre (Cottlesloe Theatre); Lyric Theatre
1985–86	After Aida	Boito	Howard Davies	Julian Mitchell	Taliesin Theatre, Swansea; Old Vic Theatre
1986	Cricket	Donald	Trevor Nunn	Andrew Lloyd Webber; Tim Rice	Windsor Castle
1988	Cat on a Hot Tin Roof	Brick	Howard Davies	Tennessee Williams	National Theatre (Lyttelton Theatre)
1989	Bent	Greta / George	Sean Mathias	Martin Sherman	Adelphi Theatre (benefit for Stonewall)
1989	Hamlet	Hamlet	Richard Eyre	Shakespeare	National Theatre (Olivier Theatre)

== Sources ==
- Ian McKellen, Alan Bates, Hugh Hudson, et al. For Ian Charleson: A Tribute. London: Constable and Company, 1990. ISBN 0-09-470250-0
