= Vincenza Garelli della Morea =

Italian composer

Vincenza Garelli della Morea née Valeggio (Countess de Cardenas; 1859 – after 1924) was an Italian pianist and composer. She also used the pseudonym Centa della Morea. She played in a salon with notable composers such as Arrigo Boito, Franco Faccio and Gaetano Coronaro. Her compositions include three pantomimes, operettas, orchestral works and a string quartet, as well as songs and piano pieces. An Ave Maria written by Della Morea at a young age was performed at the Carignano Theatre in Turin, and then again later in Catania and Rome in 1888.

== Biography ==
Vincenza Garelli della Morea was born in Valeggio, in the province of Pavia, in 1859. Della Mora studied in Turin with Carlo Pedrotti and Giovanni Bolzoni, later continuing her studies with Giovanni Sgambati. She married the Count de Cardenas and lived in Milan. She also used the pseudonym Centa della Morea. Della Morea wrote an Ave Maria for four voices and an orchestra when she was very young, which was performed at the Carignano Theatre in Turin, and then again later in Catania and Rome in 1888. Della Morea became involved in the salon of Countess Maffei, where she played with Arrigo Boito, Franco Faccio and Gaetano Coronaro, among others. In 1888 she moved to Rome. In Rome she became acquainted with writers Gabriele D'Annunzio and Matilde Serao. Her songs were performed at other salons.

== Works ==
Della Morea composed three pantomimes, an opera, Le nozze di Leporello, operettas, orchestral works, a string quartet and a number of songs and piano pieces. Selected compositions include:

- Incantesimo, operetta, libretto by G. Drovetti, 1915
- Il viaggio dei Perrichon, operetta, libretto by G. Drovetti after E. Labiche, 1916
- Le nozze di Leporello, commedia, libretto by L. Almirante), 1924
- L’esultanza della stirpe for orchestra
- Idillio pastorale for orchestra
- La ballata d’Arlecchino for orchestra
