= Centre for Contemporary Arts =

Arts centre in Glasgow, Scotland

Coordinates: 55.865864°N 4.264997°W

Centre for Contemporary Arts (CCA)
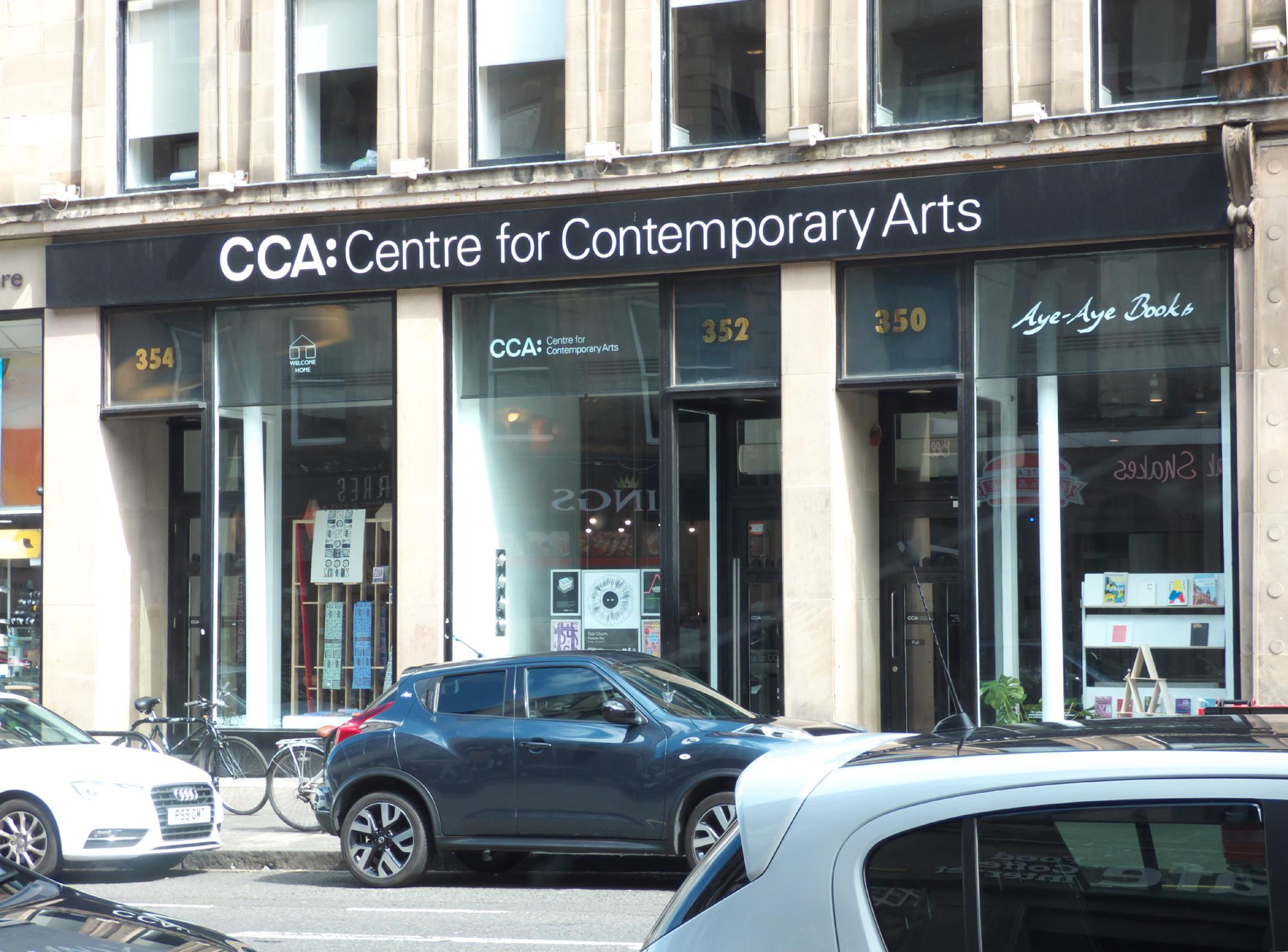
- Established: 1992
- Location: 350 Sauchiehall St, Glasgow, Scotland
- Director: Francis McKee
- Curator: Sabrina Henry
- Website: www.cca-glasgow.com

The Centre for Contemporary Arts (CCA) was an arts centre in Glasgow, Scotland. It was substantially subsidised by Creative Scotland and operated from the former Third Eye Centre in a building purchased in the 1970s by the Scottish Arts Council.

In February 2026, the CCA closed and fell into liquidation.

== History ==
=== Third Eye Centre ===
The CCA's predecessor was the Third Eye Centre in 1974, founded by the Scottish Arts Council as a multi-media arts centre by Tom McGrath. Performers at the Third Eye Centre included Allen Ginsberg, Whoopi Goldberg, John Byrne, Billy Connolly, Edwin Morgan, Kathy Acker, and Alan Davie. The Third Eye Centre included jazz and experimental music in its arts programming of the 1970s and 1980s, seeing performances from Derek Bailey, Julius Eastman, Brotherhood of Breath and Keith Tippett. The Guardian newspaper described the Third Eye Centre as "a shrine to the avant garde."

In the 1980s, the Third Eye Centre played an important role in the rise of the new Glasgow painters Steven Campbell, Ken Currie and Peter Howson. It also hosted shows by Susan Hiller, Sam Ainsley, Damien Hirst and Sophie Calle. The Third Eye Centre was also the home of the National Review of Live Art. A number of music albums were recorded there including Ivor Cutler's Life in a Scotch Sitting Room Vol II in 1978, and the centre also hosted the launch event for Alasdair Gray's Lanark in 1981.

=== Centre for Contemporary Arts ===
The CCA was established in 1992, a few years after the closure of the Third Eye Centre. The period of 1999 to 2001 saw the redevelopment of the building. The CCA took over a neighbouring villa and a building on Scott Street, doubling the size of the arts centre.

In 2014, the CCA was temporarily closed after a ruinous fire at the nearby Glasgow School of Art but reopened in October 2018 In 2023, the Saramago café and bar closed after industrial action supported by Industrial Workers of the World. A new "Third Eye Bar" opened on the upper floor in April 2024, featuring a room with murals by Fraser Taylor.

In September 2024, the centre announced it would close temporarily amid "significant financial concerns".

=== 2026 Closure ===
In February 2026, the CCA closed and fell into liquidation.

== Location and building ==
The CCA was situated on Sauchiehall Street and housed several cultural tenants, including Aye-Aye Books, as well as the Third Eye Bar and a flat for visiting artists. It was housed in the Grecian Chambers, a category A listed building, designed by Alexander 'Greek' Thomson in 1867 to 1868 and renovated by Page & Park in 1998.

== Activities ==
The CCA operated an open-source programming policy where organisations and individuals were given space in the building to direct their own events. In 2019-20, the CCA had 256 programme partners across 1,304 events and 28 festivals.

The CCA would curate six contemporary art exhibitions per year in its gallery space. The building was also home to 'Intermedia Gallery' to showcase emerging artists. The CCA offered a programme of artist residencies in the 'Creative Lab' and internationally.

In 2015, the CCA launched a public engagement programme.

The CCA was home to several other arts and culture organisations including LUX Scotland and the Scottish Writers Centre.

== See also ==
- Glasgow Film Theatre
- Glasgow School of Art
- Dundee Contemporary Arts
