= After Aida =

1985 play by Julian Mitchell

- Written by: Julian Mitchell
- Characters: Giuseppe Verdi; Arrigo Boito; Giulio Ricordi; Franco Faccio; Giuseppina Strepponi
- Original language: English
- Subject: Biography of Giuseppe Verdi
- Genre: Drama, musical, suspense, comedy
- Setting: 1879–1887; Italy

Premiere
- Date premiered: 1985
- Place premiered: Taliesin Theatre; Swansea, Wales

After Aida (original title: Verdi's Messiah) is a 1985 play-with-music by Julian Mitchell. It is about Giuseppe Verdi, and the pressure put upon him after his attempt to retire from composing. Continued insistent prodding from his friends eventually results in one of his greatest masterpieces, the opera Otello, which premiered in 1887.

== Background and inception ==
Brian McMaster, managing director of the Welsh National Opera, commissioned the play, originally as a vehicle for the company's touring season to far-flung Welsh towns with smaller theatres than the average opera house. McMaster initially asked Julian Mitchell, author of the hit play-turned-film Another Country, to write about the backstage life of an opera company. Mitchell, although he had been an opera fan in his youth, knew little about this milieu when he began working on the project.

In the course of his extensive research, however, Mitchell happened on "Boito and Verdi", the final chapter in Frank Walker's biography The Man Verdi. This was a dramatic situation that immediately appealed to him – "a great artist going through a crisis, brought back to composition after a long silence, and finding himself a substitute prodigal son in the process" – and he took it as his subject matter.

To familiarize himself with backstage and off-stage opera life, Mitchell took singing lessons, attended opera rehearsals and auditions, and talked to conductors, singers, directors, répétiteurs, and designers. Mitchell said he found that the restrictions placed on the piece—small stage, single set, and only a few actors—actually became liberating, and helped him create a well-crafted and artistically sound play.

== Synopsis ==
The two-act play spans the years from 1879 to 1887, and centers around the composer Verdi and his life and works after he has retired from composing and moved to his country estate.

Verdi's two friends, Giulio Ricordi the publisher and Franco Faccio the conductor, convinced that Verdi should write another opera, try to persuade him to come out of retirement and collaborate with the young librettist Arrigo Boito on a new work. One likely subject for a new opera is the play Othello, since Shakespeare is one of Verdi's favourite authors. Verdi's wife Giuseppina Strepponi, tired of seeing him moping about, also assists in the attempt to get Verdi composing again.

The play focuses on this major turning point in Verdi's creative life, and combines it with a selection of opera excerpts, drama, and humor. The production is punctuated with full arias and vocal ensembles from Aida, Rigoletto, Ernani, the Requiem, Macbeth, Simon Boccanegra, and Otello. Also included are arias from Boito's Mefistofele and Rossini's Otello.

== Original productions ==
After Aida opened on 24 October 1985 in Swansea, Wales, at the Taliesin Theatre. As planned, the production then toured to 11 other towns and cities throughout Wales.

The production starred Richard Griffiths (Verdi) and Ian Charleson (Boito), with a supporting cast that included four singers from the Welsh National Opera. It was directed by Howard Davies, and the music director was Martin Andre. The show was produced by Robert Fox with Ed and David Mirvish.

After Aida received its London premiere at the Old Vic theatre, opening on 11 March 1986. Giuseppina Strepponi was played by Gemma Jones, and the other cast members remained the same, except for a new cast of WNO singers.

== Original cast ==
- Richard Griffiths – Giuseppe Verdi, Italy's greatest opera composer, happily retired
- Ian Charleson – Arrigo Boito, young opera librettist; a nervous, self-doubting, neurotic genius
- Zoë Wanamaker – Giuseppina Strepponi, former renowned soprano and Verdi's second wife; a strong, intelligent woman devoted to her husband
- Malcolm Storry – Giulio Ricordi, Verdi's publisher; a solid, urbane man and Boito's good friend
- David Lyon – Franco Faccio, Verdi's favourite conductor; a prodigiously talented musician and a great friend to Boito

Additional performers, from the Welsh National Opera:

- Soprano: Christine Teare
- Mezzo-soprano: Wendy Verco
- Tenor: Michael Burch
- Bass-baritone: Jonathan Best
- Pianist: Martin Andre

The 1986 London cast was the same except for Gemma Jones, who played Giuseppina Strepponi. The singers, from the WNO, were as follows: sopranos Elizabeth Collier and Christine Teare, mezzo-sopranos Beverley Mills and Wendy Verco, tenors John Harris and Mark Hamilton, baritones Henry Newman and Steven Page, and pianists Martin Andre and Michael Lloyd.

== Critical reception and publication ==
After Aida received mixed to favorable reviews, and has been praised for its intelligence, humor, and panache. The Sunday Times review said "the plot ... is quite riveting.... For all that we know the outcome, it has us on tenterhooks!” The play has occasionally been compared to Amadeus, with After Aida being noted for its accuracy, thoughtfulness, and erudition, and Amadeus having the edge in terms of raw dramatic impact.

After Aida was published in 1986 by Amber Lane Press.

== Sources ==
- Mitchell, Julian. After Aida. Amber Lane Press, 1986.
- After Aida – Old Vic production data at robertfoxlimited.com. Retrieved 10 September 2010
