= The Innocent (play) =

1979 play by Tom McGrath

The Innocent is a 1979 play by Scottish playwright Tom McGrath. It was first performed by the Royal Shakespeare Company at the Warehouse Theatre in London, opening on 24 May 1979. The production was directed by Howard Davies and starred Ian Charleson.

The play is autobiographical, and concerns McGrath's psychedelic drug and heroin use in the counter-culture 1960s as an underground poet, writer, and musician. The protagonist Joe Maguire is an idealistic intellectual and existentialist, a jazz-playing underground newspaper editor, who is drawn into heroin use and becomes a junkie.

== Original cast ==
- Joe Maguire ... Ian Charleson
- Suzie ... Ruby Wax
- Rick ... David Lyon
- Heggie ... Hilton McRae
- Heggie's Maw ... Eve Pearce
- Malachie ... Anthony Higgins
- Andy ... David Bradley
- Jay ... Paul Moriarty
- Brenda ... Sheridan Fitzgerald
- Kate ... Avril Carson
- Pie Mackay ... Mark Windsor
- Sonny ... Alan Cody
- Dr. Smith ... Darlene Johnson
