= Arrigo Pedrollo =

Italian composer

Arrigo Pedrollo (5 December 1878 in Montebello Vicentino – 23 December 1964 in Vicenza) was an Italian composer. His father was his first teacher; at thirteen he went to study at the Milan Conservatory. Among his teachers there was Gaetano Coronaro. At his graduation in 1900, Pedrollo's only symphony was performed, under the direction of Arturo Toscanini. He chose instead to compose operas in a Wagnerian cast; in 1908 his first, Terra promessa, was premiered in Cremona. His second, Juana, won the 1913 Sonzogno Prize. Between 1920 and 1936 six more of his operas saw their premieres. In 1922 he became the head of the Conservatory in Vicenza. In 1930 he returned to Milan to teach composition at the Conservatory there; he held that post until 1941. Pedrollo retired at eighty-five, five years before his death.
