= Gaetano Coronaro =

Italian composer (1852–1908)

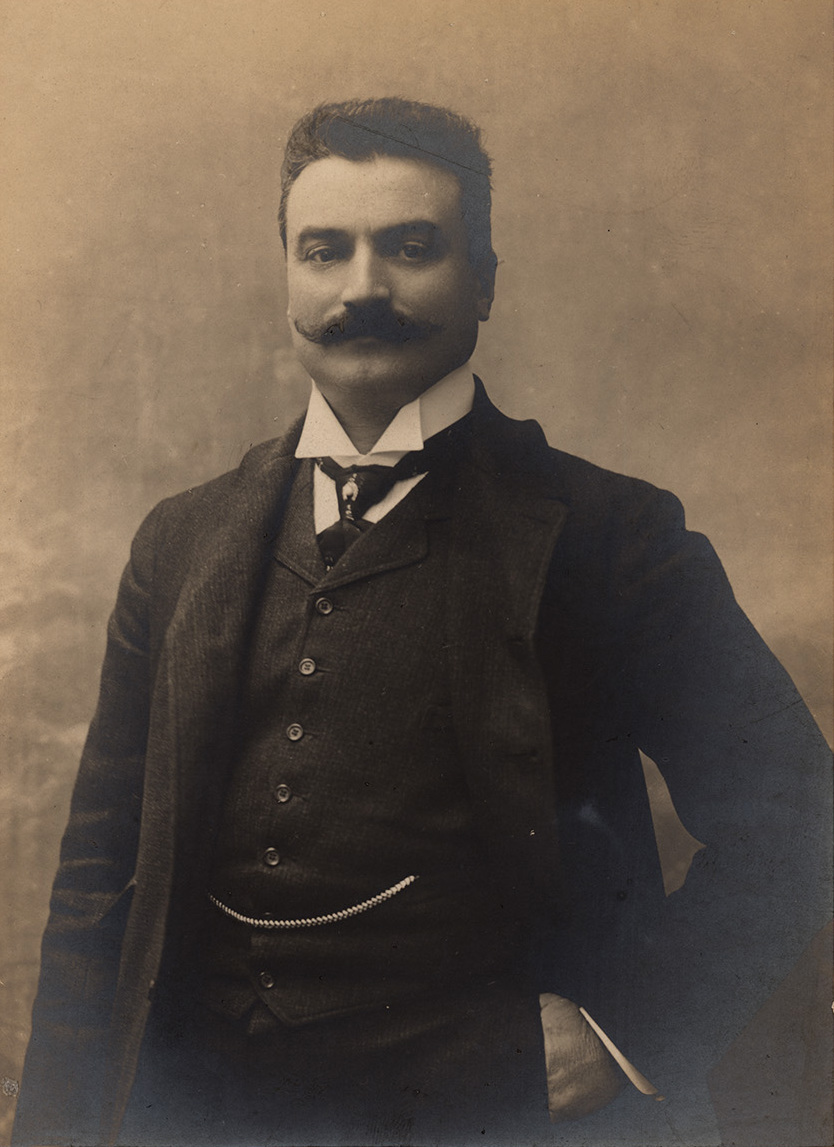
Gaetano Coronaro (1903)

Gaetano Coronaro (18 December 1852 – 5 April 1908) was an Italian conductor, pedagogue, and composer. He was born in Vicenza and had his initial musical training there followed by study from 1871 to 1873 at the Milan Conservatory under Franco Faccio. He composed orchestral works, sacred music, and chamber pieces as well as several works for the stage. La creola, which premiered at the Teatro Comunale di Bologna in 1878, was the only one to have any success.

Coronaro had settled in Milan by 1876 where he conducted at La Scala and taught at the Milan Conservatory. In 1894 he was made professor of composition there. Amongst his students was the composer Arrigo Pedrollo. Coronaro died in Milan at the age of 55. His brothers, Antonio (1851–1933) and Gellio Coronaro (1863–1916) were opera composers as well. Antonio was also the organist at Vicenza Cathedral from 1885 until his death.

== Operas ==
- Il tramonto – saggio melodrammatico (melodramatic essay), libretto by Arrigo Boito; and La morte dell' Honwed – scena drammatica (Milan Conservatory, 8 August 1873)
- La creola – opera seria in 3 acts, libretto by Eugenio and Maria Torelli-Vallier (Teatro Comunale, Bologna, 27 November 1878)
- II malacarne – dramma lirico in 3 acts, libretto by Stefano Interdonato (Teatro Grande, Brescia, 20 January 1894)
- Un curioso accidente – scena lirica in 1 act, libretto by Virginia Tedeschi-Treves after Goldoni (Teatro Vittorio Emanuele, Turin, 11 November 1903)
- Enoch Arden – libretto by Antonio Fogazzaro after Tennyson (composed 1905, unperformed)
- La signora di Challant – libretto by Giuseppe Giacosa from his play of the same name (composition date unknown, unperformed)
