= David Lyon (actor) =

British actor (1941–2013)

- Born: 16 May 1941; Sierra Leone
- Died: 7 June 2013 (aged 72); Brighton, England
- Education: Royal Central School of Speech and Drama
- Occupation: Actor
- Years active: 1975–2011

David Laurie Lyon (16 May 1941 – 7 June 2013) was a British stage, television, and film actor.

== Early life, education, and early career ==
Of Scottish descent, David Lyon was born in 1941 to Joe Lyon, a diamond merchant, and his wife Margaret.

David spent much of his childhood in Sierra Leone where his father worked, before being sent home to be educated at Crofton House in Dumfriesshire in Scotland. He won a scholarship to Merchiston Castle School in Edinburgh, but was forced to leave education at the age of 16 when his father was declared bankrupt.

He first worked in Glasgow for Royal Insurance, before moving south to England to work as a flooring salesman in Birmingham. At the age of 30 he decided to switch careers to acting.

== Acting career ==
Lyon studied acting at the Central School of Speech and Drama as a mature student, and did not take paid acting work until 1975 at the Manchester Library Theatre. From 1976, he performed regularly for two decades with the Royal Shakespeare Company. With them, he appeared in plays which include: Much Ado About Nothing, King John, Henry VI, The Winter's Tale, Troilus and Cressida, The Taming of the Shrew, Love's Labour's Lost, Romeo and Juliet, Henry IV Parts 1 and 2, and Henry V. With the RSC he also performed in several modern plays, including The Innocent (1979) and After Aida (1985–86).

He also worked steadily in television after 1980, and in a few feature films as well. In 1983 he had a lead role as the newsreader in the feature film The Ploughman's Lunch, and was Lieutenant Colonel Vernon Erskine-Crum in the serial Lord Mountbatten: The Last Viceroy. He was a cast member of the television series The Gemini Factor (1987), and was Commander Brian Huxtable in the BBC crime drama series Between the Lines (1992).

In the original BBC version of the political thriller House of Cards (1990), he played the "thoroughly decent" Prime Minister Henry Collingridge, opposite Ian Richardson as the Machiavellian Francis Urquhart. He was also a familiar face on series such as The Bill, Lovejoy, Taggart, Holby City, Midsomer Murders, Silent Witness, and Poirot.

== Personal life ==
Lyon lived for many years with fellow RSC actor Zoë Wanamaker. He met his future wife Sandra Clark in 1975 at his first acting job at the Library Theatre in Manchester, but she was married to someone else at the time. In 1988 he encountered Clark again when they played Capulet and Lady Montague in Romeo and Juliet in Stratford-upon-Avon. They wed in 1989, and Lyon had two step-children from Clark's previous marriage.
