= Car Trouble (film) =

1986 film by David Green

- Directed by: David Green
- Written by: J. Tipping; James Whaley
- Produced by: Gregory J. De Santis; Judith Goldfarb; Howard Malin
- Starring: Julie Walters; Ian Charleson
- Release dates: 28 February 1986 (United Kingdom); 18 September 1986 (West Germany); 30 October 1986 (Australia); 16 June 1986 (Portugal)
- Country: United Kingdom
- Language: English

Car Trouble is a 1986 British comedy film starring Julie Walters, Ian Charleson and Vincent Riotta. The film has been described as a coarse British farce comedy.

== Plot ==
In the throes of a midlife crisis, a man buys a 1965 Jaguar E-Type sports car and it immediately becomes his new love. What he does not know is that his wife is as attracted to the Jaguar salesman as he is to the car. The wife and lover experience penis captivus in the car after a reckless accident.

== Cast ==
- Julie Walters as Jacqueline
- Ian Charleson as Gerald
- Vincent Riotta as Kevin (as Vincenzo Ricotta)
- Stratford Johns as Reg Sampson
- Hazel O'Connor as Maureen
- Dave Hill as Bill
- Anthony O'Donnell as Frederick
- Vanessa Knox-Mawer as Judy Monk
- Roger Hume as Mr. Hollybush
- Veronica Clifford as Mrs. Hollybush
