= Third Eye Centre =

Contemporary arts centre in Glasgow

The Third Eye Centre was a contemporary arts centre in Glasgow, founded by Scottish writer Tom McGrath in 1975. It occupied the building at 350 Sauchiehall Street, close to the Glasgow School of Art, originally a warehouse designed around 1865 by Alexander Thomson. It had been purchased by the Scottish Arts Council. as its successor to the Lady Artists Club and Gallery in Blythswood Square, for female artists and students pioneered originally in 1882 as the Glasgow Society of Lady Artists (around 1970 it had been purchased by the SAC and used directly by the council for exhibitions.) The Third Eye Centre eventually closed, leaving major debts, in the early 1990s and reopened as the Centre for Contemporary Arts in 1994, again funded by the Scottish Arts Council and others.

The choice of the Third Eye name was influenced by the teaching of Indian spiritual master Sri Chinmoy who also gave a talk there.

The has venue hosted exhibitions and performances by many artists such as Allen Ginsberg, Whoopi Goldberg, John Byrne, Edwin Morgan, and Damien Hirst.
