= Giulio Ricordi =

Italian editor and musician (1840–1912)

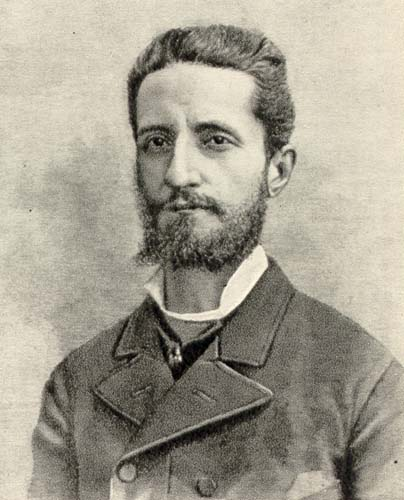
Giulio Ricordi

Giulio Ricordi (19 December 1840 – 6 June 1912) was an Italian editor and musician who joined the family firm, the Casa Ricordi music publishing house, in 1863, then run by his father, Tito, the son of the company's founder Giovanni Ricordi. Upon his father's death in 1888, Giulio became the head of the company until his death.

== Biography ==
Under the pen name Jules Burgmein, Ricordi contributed a very great deal to the prestige of the Casa Ricordi as it also produced several magazines (La gazzetta musicale, Musica e musicisti and Ars et labor), and various other once famous publications (La biblioteca del pianista, l'Opera Omnia di Frédéric Chopin, L'arte musicale in Italia, Le Sonate di Domenico Scarlatti).

Ricordi was also publisher of the later operas by Giuseppe Verdi, having established a relationship with that composer as a young man. In 1853, Ricordi built a mansion, Villa Margherita Ricordi (Coordinates 45.994321N 9.238636E), in Griante on the shore of Lake Como. Visits by Verdi to this mansion may have been related to the successful strategy of luring the aging composer out of his retirement with the composition of his two final works, Otello in 1887 and Falstaff in 1893.

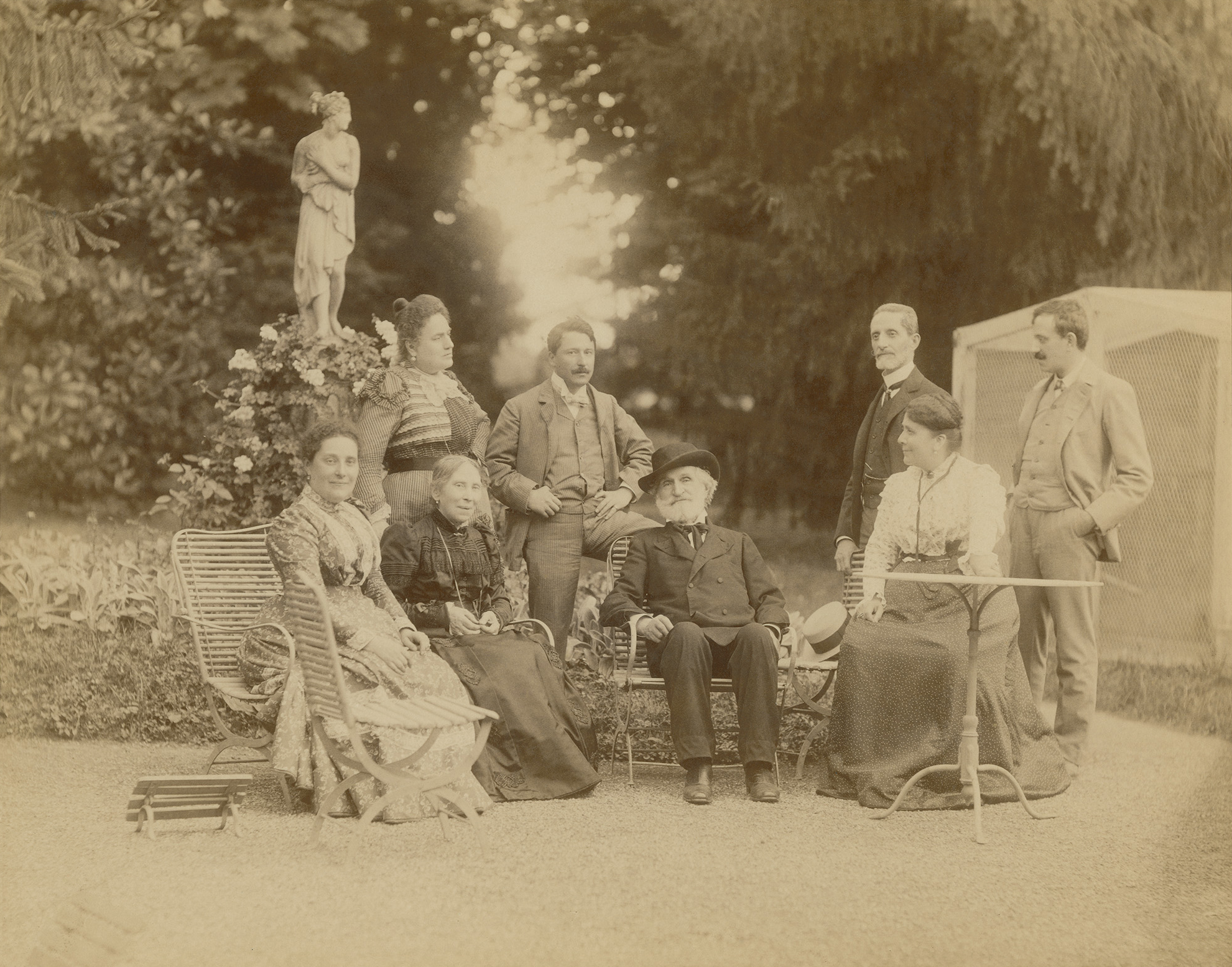
1900 group portrait at Verdi's house in Sant'Agata with various family and friends. Verdi is in the middle, and Giulio Ricordi is standing second from the right, with his wife seated below him.

But he also promoted younger composers of merit. These included Amilcare Ponchielli, Alfredo Catalani, Carlos Gomes, Umberto Giordano, and, above all, Giacomo Puccini. To Puccini in particular, he became something of a father-figure, feared (and often needing to be censorious over Puccini's dilatory work habits) but deeply trusted.

== Depictions in media ==
- The play After Aida — a 1985 play-with-music by Julian Mitchell — depicts Ricordi's struggle to get the retired Verdi to collaborate with a young librettist, Arrigo Boito, on a project, which resulted in Otello.
- In November 2001, Tell Giulio the Chocolate is Ready, a radio play by Murray Dahm, was produced and broadcast by Radio New Zealand. The play is based on the letters of the Verdi-Boito correspondence and explores the genesis and production of Verdi and Boito's opera Otello including the role played by Giulio Ricordi. The play and broadcast included those sections of the opera as they appeared in the correspondence (such as Iago's Credo).
