= Franco Faccio =

Italian composer and conductor (1840–1891)

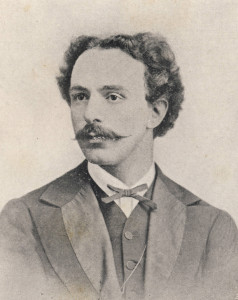
- Faccio at the time of composing Amleto
- Born: Francesco Antonio Faccio; 8 March 1840; Verona
- Died: 21 July 1891 (aged 51); Monza
- Education: Milan Conservatory
- Occupations: Composer, conductor

Francesco (Franco) Antonio Faccio (8 March 1840 – 21 July 1891) was an Italian composer and conductor. Born in Verona, he studied music at the Milan Conservatory from 1855 where he was a pupil of Stefano Ronchetti-Monteviti and, as scholar William Ashbrook notes, "where he struck up a lifelong friendship with Arrigo Boito, two years his junior" and with whom he was to collaborate in many ways.

Initially, he became known as the composer of two operas and, in his years (1871–1889) as music director of the Teatro alla Scala opera house, Faccio became known as a conductor of Verdi's music at La Scala, in different parts of Italy, and abroad.

== Professional career ==
After finishing his studies he began his career as a composer. His first collaboration with Boito was on a patriotic cantata, Il quattro giugno in 1860 when Boito also wrote some of the music as well as the text, and this was followed by a sequel, La sorelle d'Italia, also in the spirit of the movement towards Italian unification. With these pieces, both young men received entrees into Italian society, hence Faccio's association with Countess Maffei and the letters of introduction which followed which allowed both him and Boito access to Rossini in Paris in 1862.

=== Operas ===
Both men began work on new operas, Boito's eventually becoming Mefistofele. Faccio returned to Milan to write his first opera, I profughi fiamminghi, which was based on a text by Emilio Praga and written for La Scala where it was presented on 11 November 1863. Not a success, it survived for only five performances. However, its failure was followed by a celebratory party given for Faccio by his friends. The event included Boito's reading of the infamous "Ode saffica col bicchiere alla mano", which infuriated Giuseppe Verdi.

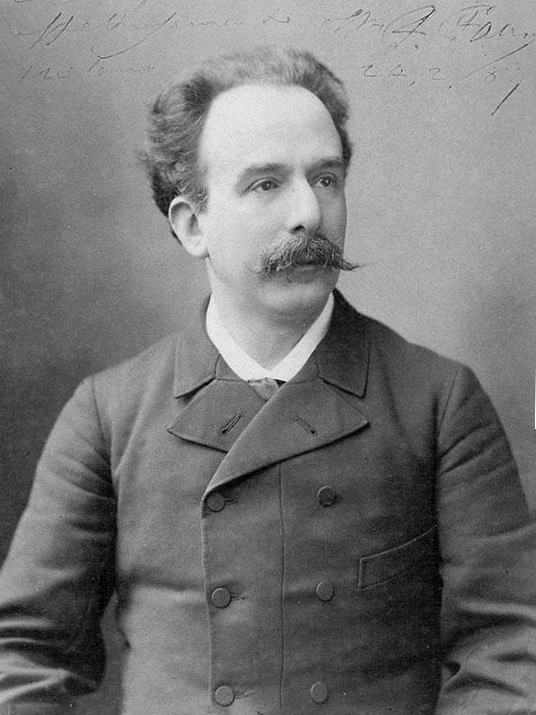
Faccio in 1887

Faccio's second opera, Amleto, one of the many operas based on William Shakespeare's Hamlet, was written for Genoa's Teatro Carlo Felice and was given its première on 30 May 1865. The cast included some of the finest singers of the day. As Ashbrook notes, while its "innovatory libretto" was written by Boito, there was "dismay at the score's paucity of melody", but he does add that Ophelia's funeral march, the "Marcia Funebre", "[won] general approval".

However, the critics were unanimous in their praise of the promise shown in the young composer and, in the following contemporary accounts, the audience appears to have shown its pleasure at what they had heard. On 31 May, the Gazzetta di Genova wrote:

The opera was generally applauded at the end of the first act, at Ofelia and Amleto's duet, at the finale of the second act, at Ofelia's canzone in the third, and at the funeral march of the fourth. The young maestro was called to the stage many times.

In a letter to Faccio's Milan teacher Ronchetti-Monteviti, Alberto Mazzucato wrote of the premiere:

Amleto [...] aroused unusual and profound emotions in the Genovese public, which celebrated your distinguished student with every type of flattering reception. The curtain-calls for the maestro and the performers were unanimous, insistent, continuous, and ever warmer as the imaginative work unfolded before the eyes of the listeners who were highly surprised with the truth of its conception, the newness of form, the passion of the melodies, the ensemble harmony, and of the robust skill that dominates the whole score.

=== As a conductor ===
Faccio left Italy for two years and "honed his skills as an opera conductor in Scandinavia [but] secured a post at the Teatro Carcano on his return to Milan in the Autumn of 1868". He also taught composition at the Milan Conservatory for the following ten years. In 1871, after working as an assistant conductor under Eugenio Terziani at La Scala, he was named as music director of that house which mounted a revised version of Amleto on 12 February that year. It was not a success, and was never performed again during Faccio's lifetime.

At La Scala, he conducted the first Italian performance of Aida in 1872 and this was followed by the first performance of Verdi's Otello in 1887, which starred his long-time lover Romilda Pantaleoni as Desdemona, Francesco Tamagno as Otello and Victor Maurel as Iago. Other premieres of the revised versions which he conducted included Simon Boccanegra in 1881 and Don Carlo in 1884. Faccio helped to launch Puccini's career, conducting his graduation piece from the Milan Conservatory, Capriccio sinfonico, in 1884.

When Victor Maurel was planning to revive the Théâtre-Italien company at the Théâtre des Nations in Paris in 1883, it was hoped that Faccio would be chief conductor. He was hoping for not less than 100,000 francs. However, the managers at La Scala, the Corti brothers, agreed a new contract with Faccio which kept him in Milan. In the end Gialdino Gialdini was engaged instead, with a young Arnaldo Conti as assistant conductor: Faccio only conducted four of the eight performances of Simon Boccanegra in Paris through the 1883-1884 season.

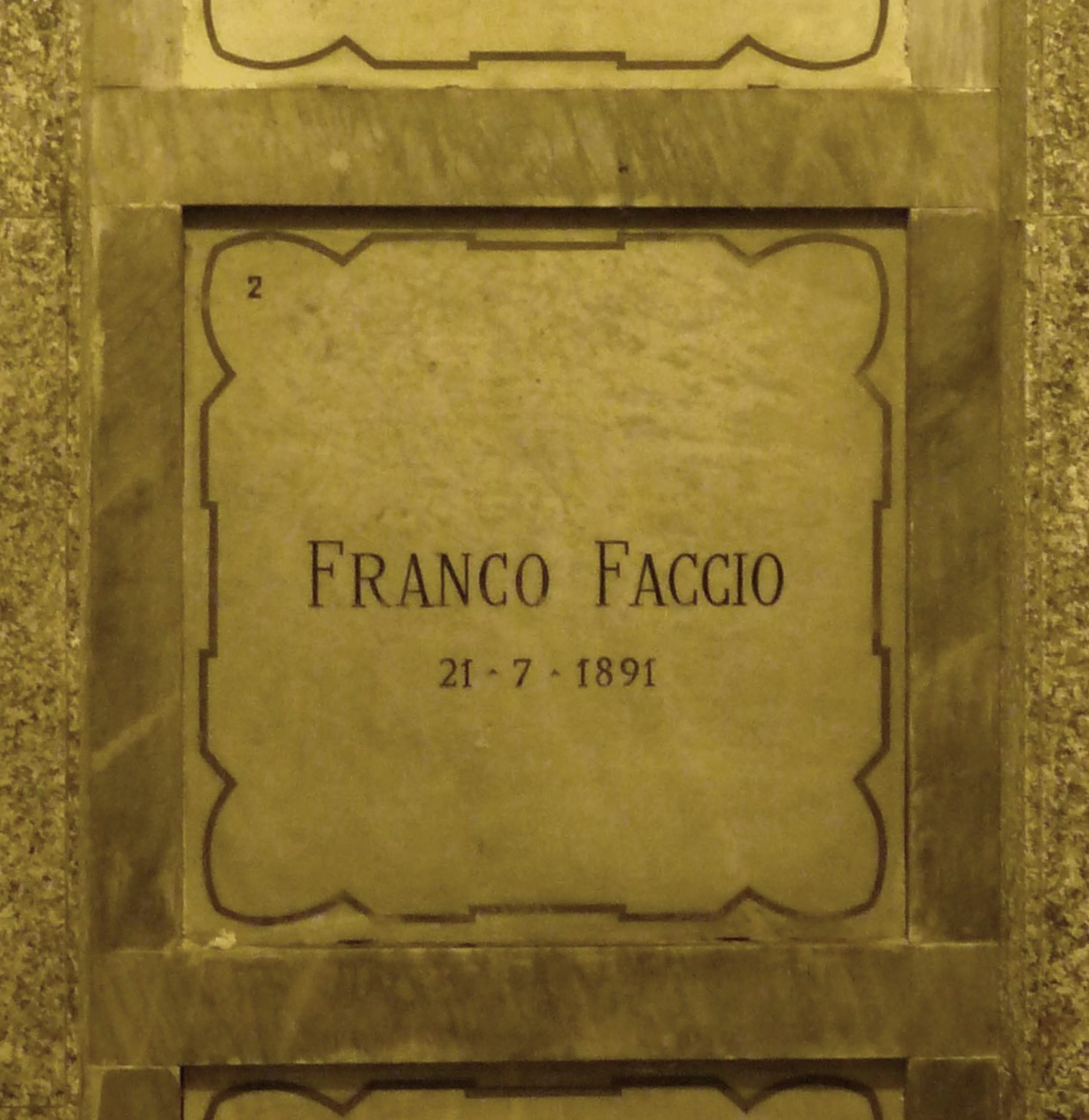
Faccio's grave at the Monumental Cemetery of Milan

He continued to have an active conducting career in several Italian cities, as well as abroad where Otello was given its première. These included London on 5 July 1889 with Tamagno repeating his triumph as the Moor, and the Italian premiere of Richard Wagner's Die Meistersinger. But by late 1889, his health was having a profound effect on his work. Verdi arranged for a less stressful post in Parma, but even that was too much. After a diagnosis related to syphilis, he was institutionalized in Monza and died there.

== Faccio's other activities ==
Faccio also continued to compose after the premiere of Amleto, writing among other things a "Quartetto". Sometime in 1870 Giovanni Ricordi commissioned him to write a third opera, Patria, based on a play by Victorien Sardou. Verdi himself intervened on Faccio's behalf to try to secure the rights to the play, but Sardou, hoping that Verdi himself would set the drama to music, refused.

In 1874 a symphony Faccio had composed as early as 1859 was finally published, in piano duet reduction, by Ricordi.

In 1866 both Boito and Faccio joined the Italian army to fight alongside Garibaldi. In addition to his purely militaristic excursions, Faccio used the opportunity to travel extensively throughout Europe, perusing Beethoven's autograph of Fidelio in Berlin in addition to getting to know Tannhäuser and Lohengrin. As his European travels came to an end in 1867, he traveled to Copenhagen on a steamship named Hamlet, and was amused to see other ships named after Shakespeare's tragedy. While in Denmark, he made a special trip to Elsinore and visited the Royal Castle where he had the feeling that at any moment one could imagine seeing the "wandering and troubled shade of the assassinated king."

The disastrous premiere of Boito's Mefistofele at La Scala in 1868 added to the growing necessity of a compositional success by Boito and Faccio, self-appointed representatives of the "Music of the future" in Italy. In early 1870, the Gazzetta Musicale reported on the possibility (eventually unrealized) of staging Amleto in Florence.

== Revival of interest in Faccio's Amleto ==
In 2004, conductor Anthony Barrese had edited Amleto's score, produced a piano vocal score, and presented a scene from act 3 of the work on stage with the apprentices of the Sarasota Opera. At Sarasota he also recorded several arias and a scene from the opera. Using this critical edition, the opera was revived in a semi-staged production by the Baltimore Concert Opera and then fully staged at Opera Southwest in Albuquerque, New Mexico in October 2014. Both were conducted by Barrese. In July, 2016, the opera was produced at the Bregenz Festival. A Unitel Blu-ray disc of the production was released in 2017.

Barrese also presented the "Marcia funebre" with the Dallas Opera Orchestra in 2007. This part of the opera is presented in Corfu each year during Easter, when the band of Philharmonic Society of Corfu performs it during the epitaph litany of Saint Spyridon on the morning of Holy Saturday.

== Depictions in media ==
- The play After Aida, a 1985 play-with-music by Julian Mitchell, depicts the struggle of Faccio and the music publisher Giulio Ricordi amongst others to get the retired Verdi to collaborate with the young librettist, Arrigo Boito on a new project - the result of which became Otello.

Preceded by Eugenio Terziani	Music Director, La Scala; 1871–1889	Succeeded by Arturo Toscanini
