= Taliesin Arts Centre =

- Canolfan Celfyddydau Taliesin
- Interactive map of Taliesin Arts Centre

General information
- Location: Swansea, Wales
- Coordinates: 51.6103°N 3.9791°W
- Opened: 1984
- Owner: Swansea University

Design and construction
- Architect: Peter Moro

Website
- https://www.taliesinartscentre.co.uk/en/

Taliesin Arts Centre (Welsh: Canolfan y Celfyddydau Taliesin) is owned and managed by Swansea University and is located on the university's Singleton campus in Swansea, Wales, United Kingdom.

== History ==
The Centre was opened on 18 June 1984 by Sir Geriant Evans CBE. Stephen Hawking gave the inaugural lecture at the centre's opening. It stages its own productions and hosts visiting artists, in addition to being the home to the Egypt Centre, a two-storey gallery containing an important collection of antiquities from Ancient Egypt.

The centre is named for the ancient Welsh bard, Taliesin.

The centre hosts a broad programme of events including cinema screenings and a variety of live performances, from dance and drama to jazz and world music.

Taliesin Arts Centre provides a service to both students and the people of Swansea and acts as a regional centre. Performers in recent years have included Jamie Cullum, Clare Teal, Billy Cobham and Paco Peña.

== Location ==
The Taliesin Arts Centre is located to the north of the Mall in Singleton Park, Swansea.
