= Arrigo Boito =

Italian librettist and composer (1842–1918)

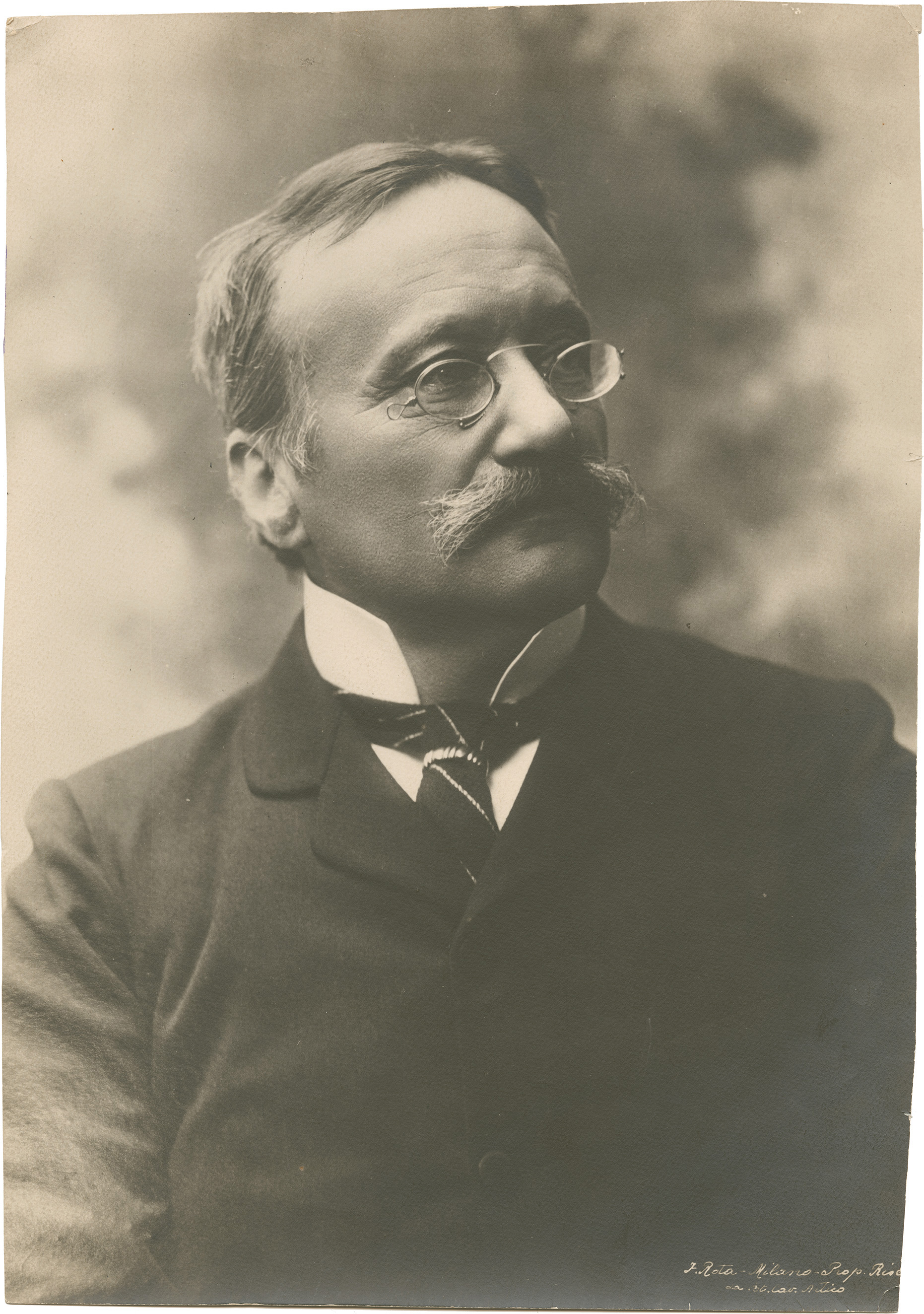
- Born: Enrico Giuseppe Giovanni Boito; 24 February 1842; Padua, Kingdom of Lombardy–Venetia
- Died: 10 June 1918 (aged 76); Milan, Kingdom of Italy
- Education: Milan Conservatory
- Occupations: Librettist, composer, poet, critic
- Writing career
- Genre: Libretto
- Notable works: Mefistofele; Libretti for Giuseppe Verdi's Otello and Falstaff and Amilcare Ponchielli's La Gioconda
- Movements: Scapigliatura, Lombard line

Signature
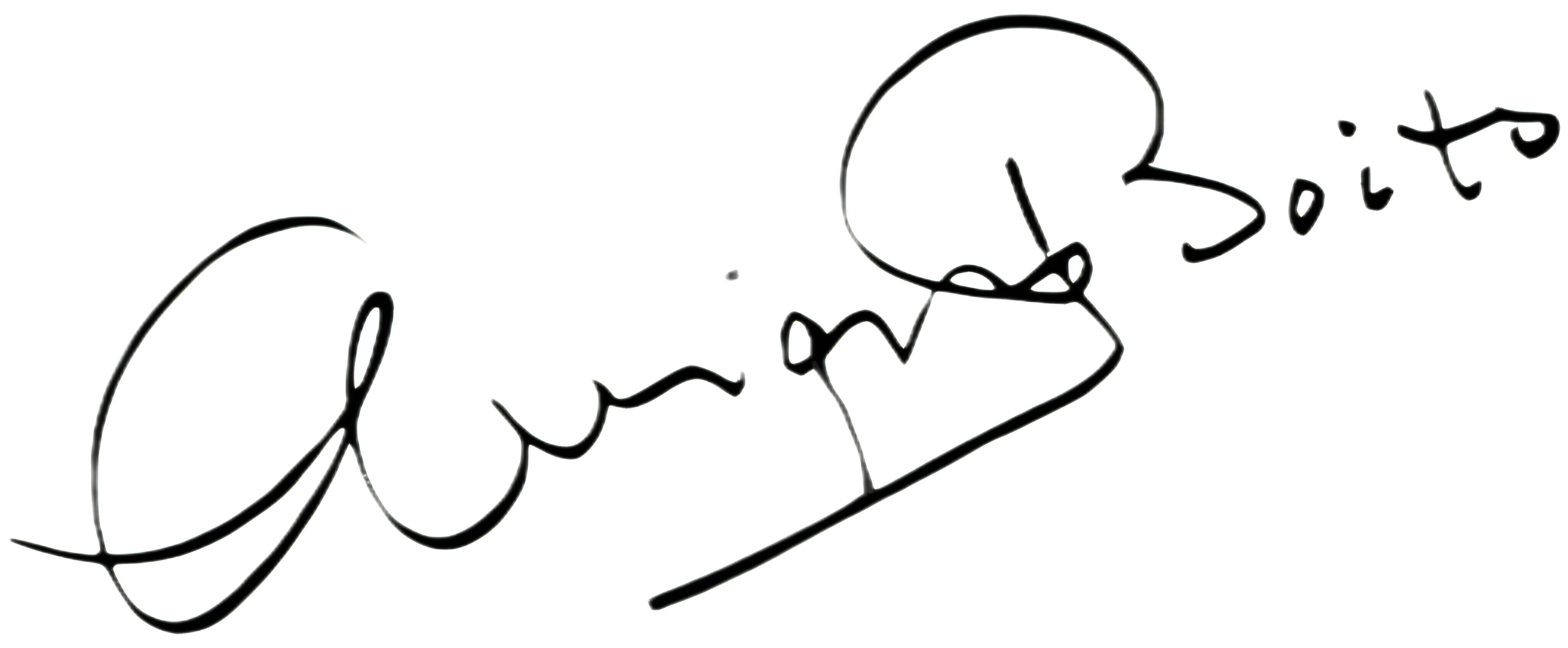

Arrigo Boito (Italian: [arˈriːɡo ˈbɔito]; born Enrico Giuseppe Giovanni Boito; 24 February 1842 – 10 June 1918) was an Italian librettist, composer, poet and critic whose only completed opera was Mefistofele. Among the operas for which he wrote the libretti are Giuseppe Verdi's monumental last two operas Otello and Falstaff as well as Amilcare Ponchielli's La Gioconda.

Along with Emilio Praga and his brother Camillo Boito, he is regarded as one of the prominent representatives of the Scapigliatura (Italian bohemian) artistic movement. He wrote essays under the anagrammatic pseudonym of Tobia Gorrio.

== Biography ==
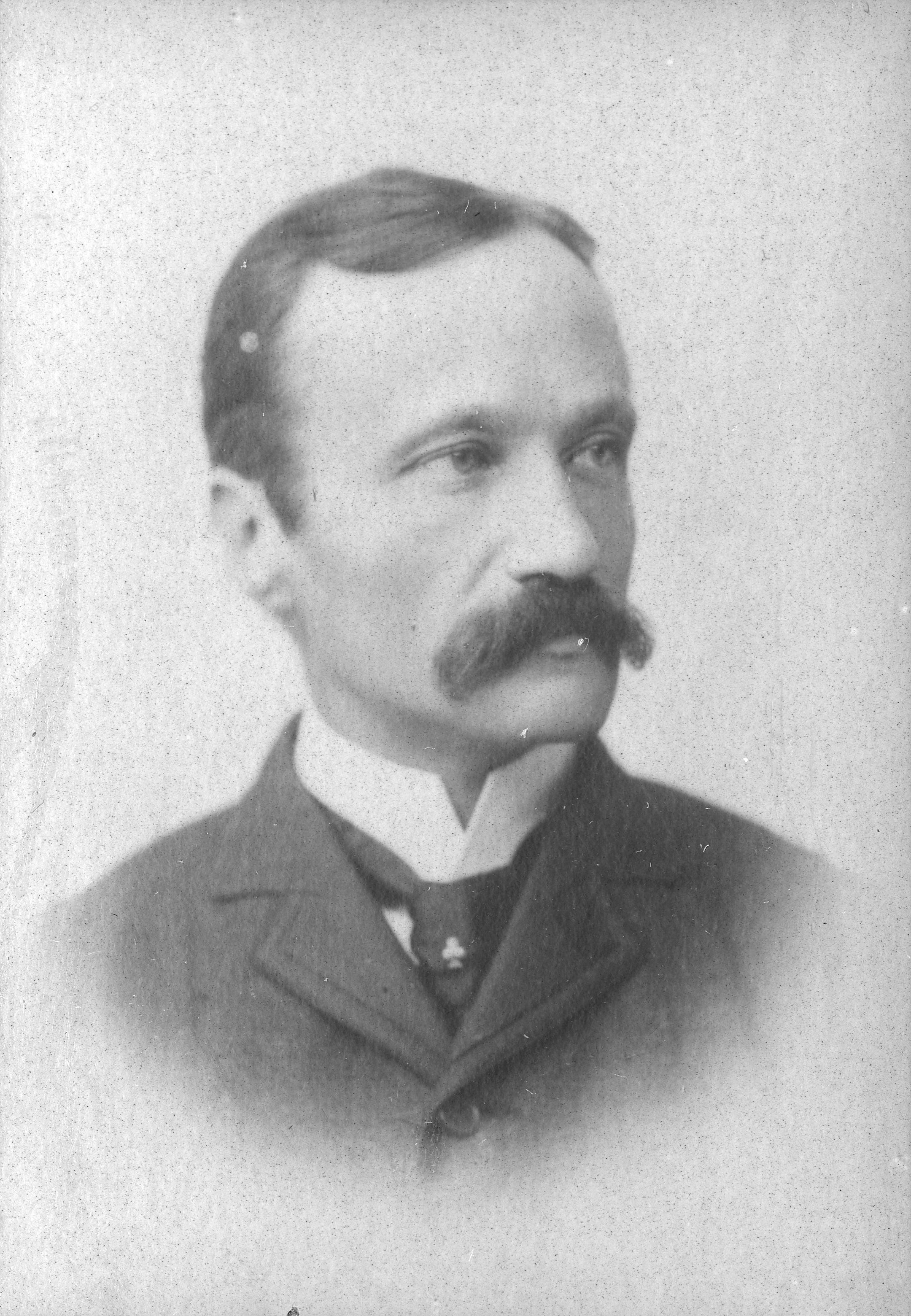
Boito at age 44

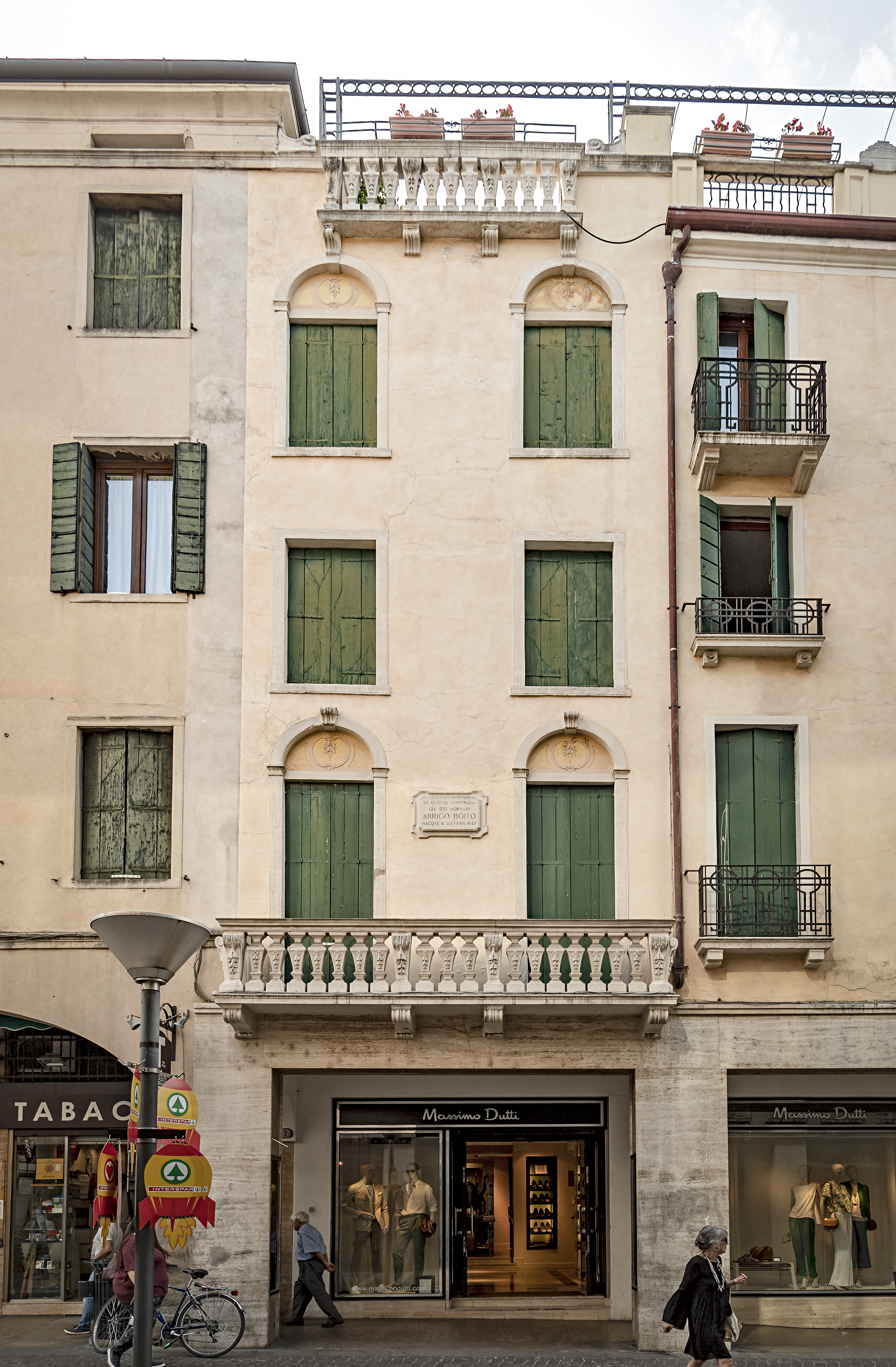
Birthplace in Padua

Boito was born in Padua. He was the son of Silvestro Boito, a painter of miniatures, who was not of noble birth but passed himself off as a nobleman, and his wife, a Polish countess, Józefina Radolińska. His older brother, Camillo Boito, was an Italian architect and engineer as well as a noted art critic, art historian and novelist.

Boito studied music at the Milan Conservatory with Alberto Mazzucato until 1861, where he was a contemporary of Albert Visetti and Amintore Galli. In 1866, with Galli, Franco Faccio, and Emilio Praga, Boito fought under Giuseppe Garibaldi in the Seven Weeks' War in which the Kingdom of Italy and Prussia fought against Austria, after which Venice was ceded to Italy.

Between 1887 and 1894, he had an affair with the celebrated actress Eleonora Duse. Their relationship was carried out in a highly clandestine manner, presumably because of Boito's many aristocratic friends and acquaintances. Despite this, their voluminous correspondence over the years survives. The two remained on good terms until his death.

Towards the end of his musical career, Boito succeeded Giovanni Bottesini as director of the Parma Conservatory after the latter's death in 1889 and held the post until 1897. He received the honorary degree of Doctor of Music from the University of Cambridge in 1893, and on his death in Milan, he was interred there in the Cimitero Monumentale. He was an atheist.

A memorial concert was given in his honour at La Scala in 1948. The orchestra was conducted by Arturo Toscanini. Recorded in very primitive sound, the concert has been issued on CD.

== Career in music ==
Boito wrote very little music, but completed (and later destroyed) the opera Ero e Leandro and left incomplete a further opera, Nerone, which he had been working at, on and off, between 1877 and 1915. Excluding its last act, for which Boito left only a few sketches, Nerone was finished after his death by Arturo Toscanini and Vincenzo Tommasini and premiered at La Scala in 1924. He also left a Symphony in A minor in manuscript.

Mefistofele

His only completed opera, Mefistofele, based on Goethe's Faust, was given its first performance on 5 March 1868, at La Scala, Milan. The premiere, which he conducted himself, was badly received, provoking riots and duels over its supposed "Wagnerism", and it was closed by the police after two performances. Verdi commented, "He aspires to originality but succeeds only at being strange." Boito withdrew the opera from further performances to rework it, and it had a more successful second premiere, in Bologna on 10 April 1875. This revised and drastically cut version also changed Faust from a baritone to a tenor. Mefistofele is the only work of his performed with any regularity today, and Enrico Caruso included its two tenor arias in his first recording session. The prologue to the opera, set in Heaven, is a favourite concert excerpt.

Libretti

Boito's literary powers never waned. As well as writing the libretti for his own operas, he wrote them for greater operas by two other composers. As "Tobia Gorrio" (an anagram of his name), he provided the libretto for Amilcare Ponchielli's La Gioconda.

Collaboration with Verdi

Shortly after he had collaborated with Verdi on Inno delle nazioni ("Anthem of the Nations", London, 1862), Boito offended him in a toast to his long-time friend, the composer (and later conductor) Franco Faccio. The rapprochement was effected by the music publisher Giulio Ricordi, whose long-term aim was to persuade Verdi to write another opera. Verdi agreed that Boito should revise the libretto of the original 1857 Simon Boccanegra. Musicologist Roger Parker speculates that this was based on a desire to "test the possibility" of working with Boito, before possibly embarking on a larger project. The revised Boccanegra premiered to great acclaim in 1881. With that, their mutual friendship and respect blossomed, and that larger project became Otello. Although Verdi's aim to write the music for an opera based on Shakespeare's King Lear never came to fruition (despite the existence of a libretto), Boito provided subtle and resonant libretti not just for Otello (based on Shakespeare's play Othello) but also for Falstaff (which was based on two other Shakespeare plays, The Merry Wives of Windsor and parts of Henry IV). After those many years of close association, when Verdi died in 1901, Boito was at his bedside.

== Libretti by Boito ==
The years given are those of the premieres. Boito also provided the text to Verdi's cantata Inno delle Nazioni which was first given on 24 May 1862 at Her Majesty's Theatre, London.

- Amleto (Franco Faccio; 1865)
- Mefistofele (1868, his own music; 1875, his own music)
- Un tramonto (Gaetano Coronaro; 1873)
- La falce (Alfredo Catalani; 1875)
- La Gioconda (Amilcare Ponchielli; 1876)
- Semira (L. San Germano; never perf.)
- Ero e Leandro (Giovanni Bottesini; 1879 – Luigi Mancinelli; 1897)
- Simon Boccanegra (Giuseppe Verdi; 1881 [revised version of the 1857 original])
- Basi e bote (Riccardo Pick-Mangiagalli; 1927)
- Otello (Verdi; 1887)
- Falstaff (Verdi; 1893)
- Nerone (Boito, unfinished, lacking act V; 1924)

== Recordings ==
Recordings of two operas exist:

- Mefistofele
- Nerone

== Depictions in media ==
- The play After Aida — a 1985 play-with-music by Julian Mitchell — depicts the struggle of Giulio Ricordi and Franco Faccio to get the retired Verdi to collaborate with young Boito on a project, which resulted in Otello.
- In November 2001, Tell Giulio the Chocolate is Ready, a radio play by Murray Dahm, was produced and broadcast by Radio New Zealand. The play is based on the letters of the Verdi-Boito correspondence and explores the genesis and production of Verdi and Boito's opera Otello. The play and broadcast included those sections of the opera as they appeared in the correspondence (such as Iago's Credo).

== See also ==
- Scapigliatura
- Lombard line
