= Tom McGrath (playwright) =

Scottish playwright and jazz pianist

Tom McGrath (23 October 1940 – 29 April 2009) was a Scottish activist with the underground press in London in the 1960s. He was also a prominent playwright and jazz pianist.

== Early life ==
McGrath was born in Rutherglen, Glasgow in October 1940. His father was an electrician and his mother a housewife. They were a Roman Catholic family and Tom grew up rejecting the repressive aspects of Scottish culture.

During the mid-1960s he was associated with the emerging UK underground culture, participating in Alexander Trocchi's Project Sigma, working as features editor of Peace News. In 1966 he was the founding editor of the International Times. During the early 1970s he worked with Billy Connolly on The Great Northern Welly-Boot Show. From 1974 to 1977 he was director of the Third Eye Centre (named after the influence of Sri Chinmoy), an arts centre on Sauchiehall Street in Glasgow.

During this time, he wrote the popular play Laurel and Hardy. In 1977 he worked with Jimmy Boyle (then recently released from the Special Unit at Barlinnie jail) on the play The Hardman. McGrath's autobiographical 1979 play The Innocent relates his drug use and addiction during the 1960s. His play Animal, an excursion into the anthropoid substructure of society, featured in the programme of the Edinburgh International Festival in 1980 and was staged again by the Scottish Theatre Company in 1981.

In 1986 he wrote the script for a short film commissioned by COSLA and produced by Glasgow Film and Video Workshop. The film was written as a comedy-drama and toured Scotland on a bus after being shown at the Edinburgh Film Festival.
