= Howard Davies (director) =

British theatre and TV director (1945–2016)

- Born: 26 April 1945; Reading, England
- Died: 25 October 2016 (aged 71)
- Education: Durham University; Bristol University
- Occupation: Theatre director
- Spouses: Susan Wall (divorced) Clare Holman (m. 2005)
- Children: 2

Stephen Howard Davies, CBE (26 April 1945 – 25 October 2016) was a British theatre and television director.

== Early life ==
Davies was the son of miner and glassblower Thomas Emrys Davies, from Maesteg, and Hilda Bevan. He was born in Reading, England. He was educated at Christ's Hospital school, Horsham and then studied at Durham University (1963-1966) and Bristol University, where he developed an appreciation for the works of Bertolt Brecht.

== Career ==
In the early 1970s, Davies worked extensively with the Bristol Old Vic and the Birmingham Repertory Theatre, and he served as an associate director for both the Royal Shakespeare Company, where he directed Les liaisons Dangereuses, Macbeth, and Troilus and Cressida. He also did much work for the Royal National Theatre, where his projects included Hedda Gabler, The House of Bernarda Alba, Pygmalion, The Crucible, The Shaughraun, and Paul., and where he directed Chekhov's The Cherry Orchard which opened in May 2011 and was broadcast on 30 June 2011 as part of National Theatre Live. At the Almeida Theatre he directed Who's Afraid of Virginia Woolf? and The Play About the Baby, whilst at the Hampstead Theatre he directed the 2012 premiere of 55 Days.

His opera credits include Idomeneo, The Italian Girl in Algiers, Eugene Onegin, and I due Foscari, and he directed the opera-related play After Aida 1985–86 in Wales and at the Old Vic Theatre.

Davies' work in West End theatre won him the Laurence Olivier Award for Best Director for The Iceman Cometh, All My Sons and The White Guard; the London Critics Circle Award for Best Director for Mourning Becomes Electra and The Iceman Cometh; and the Evening Standard Award for Best Director for All My Sons and Flight.

Davies made his Broadway debut with Piaf in 1981. His Broadway credits also include Les liaisons Dangereuses, the 1990 revival of Cat on a Hot Tin Roof, the 1993 revival of My Fair Lady, Translations, the 1999 revival of The Iceman Cometh, the 2002 revival of Private Lives, and the 2007 revival of A Moon for the Misbegotten. He was nominated for the Tony Award for Best Direction of a Play thrice but did not win, and the Drama Desk Award for Outstanding Director of a Play three times, winning for Les Liaisons Dangereuses.

Davies' screen credits include the television films Copenhagen and Blue/Orange and the feature film The Secret Rapture.

Davies was appointed Commander of the Order of the British Empire (CBE) in the 2011 New Year Honours, for services to drama.

== Personal life and death ==
He married Susan Wall, whom he met in the early 1970s; the couple had two daughters. Davies was married to actress Clare Holman, from 2005 until his death. Davies died of oesophageal cancer on 25 October 2016 at the age of 71.
