= My Christmas =

My Christmas may refer to:

- My Christmas (Andrea Bocelli album), 2009 album by Andrea Bocelli
- My Christmas Special, 2009 video album by Andrea Bocelli and David Foster
- My Christmas (Plácido Domingo album), 2014 album by Plácido Domingo
- My Christmas EP, 2004 EP by George Huff
