= Alexander Nevsky (Prokofiev) =

1938 film score by Sergei Prokofiev

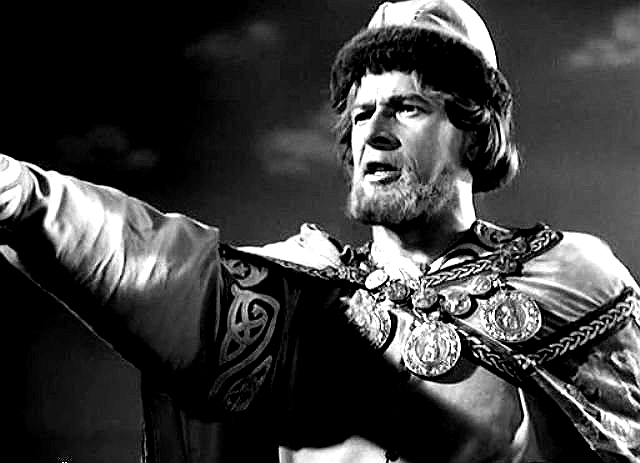
Nikolay Cherkasov as Aleksander Nevsky

Alexander Nevsky (Russian: Александр Невский) is the score composed by Sergei Prokofiev for Sergei Eisenstein's 1938 film Alexander Nevsky. The subject of the film is the 13th century incursion of the knights of the Livonian Order into the territory of the Novgorod Republic, their capture of the city of Pskov, the summoning of Prince Alexander Nevsky to the defense of Rus', and his subsequent victory over the crusaders in 1242. The majority of the score's song texts were written by the poet Vladimir Lugovskoy.

In 1939, Prokofiev arranged the music of the film score as the cantata Alexander Nevsky, Op. 78, for contralto (often sung by mezzo-sopranos but not in fact in that range), chorus and orchestra. It is one of the few examples (Lieutenant Kijé is another) of film music that has found a permanent place in the standard repertoire, and has also remained one of the most renowned cantatas of the 20th century.

Eisenstein, Prokofiev, and Lugovskoy later collaborated again on another historical epic, Ivan the Terrible Part 1 (1944) and Part 2 (1946, Eisenstein's last film).

== Alexander Nevsky, film score (1938) ==
=== Composition history ===
The score was Prokofiev's third for a film, following Lieutenant Kijé (1934) and The Queen of Spades (1936). Prokofiev was heavily involved not just with the composition, but with the recording as well. He experimented with different microphone distances in order to achieve the desired sound. Horns meant to represent the Teutonic Knights, for instance, were played close enough to the microphones to produce a crackling, distorted sound. The brass and choral groups were recorded in different studios and the separate pieces were later mixed.

Prokofiev employed different sections of the orchestra, as well as different compositional styles, to evoke the necessary imagery. For instance, the Teutonic Knights (seen as the adversary) are represented by heavy brass instruments, playing discordant notes in a martial style. The sympathetic Russian forces are represented predominantly by folk-like instruments such as woodwind and strings, often playing quasi-folksong style music.

=== Publication history ===
In 2003, German conductor Frank Strobel reconstructed the original score of Alexander Nevsky with the cooperation of the Glinka State Central Museum of Musical Culture and the Russian State Archive of Literature and Art (RGALI). The score is published by Musikverlage Hans Sikorski, Hamburg.

=== Performance history ===
The film Alexander Nevsky premiered on 23 November 1938 at the Bolshoi Theatre in Moscow.

The concert premiere of the complete original film score, as reconstructed by Frank Strobel, took place on 16 October 2003, accompanied by a showing of the film at the Konzerthaus Berlin. Strobel conducted the Berlin Radio Symphony Orchestra and the Ernst Senff Chor, with mezzo-soprano Marina Domashenko as soloist.

The Russian premiere of the restored film score took place on 27 November 2004 at the Bolshoi Theatre.

=== Instrumentation ===
- Strings: violins I & II, violas, cellos, double basses
- Woodwinds: piccolo, 2 flutes, 3 oboes (including English horn), 3 clarinets (including E♭ clarinet), 2 bass clarinets, 2 alto saxophones, 2 tenor saxophones, 3 bassoons (including contrabassoon)
- Brass: 4 horns, 5 trumpets (including cornet), 3 trombones, bass trombone, 2 tubas
- Percussion: timpani, 2 snare drums, bass drum, cymbals, 2 tambourines, wood block, rattle, triangle, xylophone, tubular bells, tamtam, gong
- Other: 2 harps, piano
- Banda: 2 horns, tierhorn, 2 trumpets, tenor flügelhorn

=== Cues ===
Film score cues are musical numbers, background music, music fragments (e.g., fanfares), musical soundscape (e.g., bells), or strings of these, forming continuous stretches of music with little or no intervening dialogue. The finished soundtrack of Alexander Nevsky contains 27 cues. The original working titles of the cues in Prokofiev's manuscripts are listed in the table below. The list appears to be incomplete, and the titles themselves are not particularly descriptive.

The first column represents the cue numbers to which the titles likely correspond. The original Russian titles are provided by Kevin Bartig in Composing for the Red Screen, where they are not numbered, but are grouped by thematic content.

The fourth and fifth columns give the German titles and their sequence as provided by Musikverlag Hans Sikorski , the publisher of the restored original film score. This order of the cues does not appear to represent the sequence used in the film.

The table can be sorted by clicking on the buttons in the title bar. The default sequence can be restored by refreshing the browser (press F5).

	Original	English	German	
01	Разоренная Русь	Ravaged Rus'	Das zerstörte Russland	01
02; 03	«А, и было дело на Неве-реке»	"It happened on the Neva River"	-	-
05	Псков 1-й	Pskov 1	Pskow (Das erste)	03
06	Псков 2-й	Pskov 2	Pskow (Das zweite)	04
07	«Вставайте, люди русские!»	"Аrise, Russian People!"	-	-
08	Вече	Veche	Das Wetsche	07
09	Вече	Veche	Das Wetsche	08
10	Мобилизация	Mobilization	Mobilisierung	09
12	Рассвет	Dawn	Sonnenaufgang	02
13?	Русские рожки	Russian Horns	Russische Hörner	11
14	Свинья	Swine (or The Wedge)	Das Schwein	10
15	Конная атака	Cavalry Attack	Reiterattacke	19
16?	Рога перед каре	The Horns before the Square	Das Horn vor dem Karree	13
16	Каре	The Square	Das Karree	15
17?	Рог тонет	The Horn Sounds	Das Horn geht unter	12
18	Поединок	The Duel	Der Zweikampf	16
18?	После поединка	After the Duel	Nach dem Zweikampf	17
19?	Рога в преследовании	The Horns in the Pursuit	Das Horn in der Verfolgung	18
19	Преследование	The Pursuit	Verfolgung	20
20; 21	«Отзовитеся, ясны соколы»	"Respond, bright falcons!"	-	-
22	Въезд во Псков	Entry into Pskov	Einzug in Pskow	21
?	Псков 3-й	Pskov 3	Pskow (Das dritte)	05
?	Псков 4-й	Pskov 4	Pskow (Das vierte)	06
26	Сопели	Sopeli	Das Prusten	14
27	-	Finale	Finale	22

Note: "Sopeli" (flutes or recorders) refers to two passages, one in 'The Battle on the Ice', cue 16, and one in the final scene in Pskov, cue 26, that depict a group of skomorokhi. The group appears to be composed of players of svireli (flutes), zhaleyki (hornpipes), rozhki (horns), bubnï (tambourines), and other folk or skomorokh instruments.

=== Structure ===
The film is divided into 9 'scenes' by intertitles stating the location of the action, or, in the case of the 'Battle on the Ice', the date—'5 April 1242'. The table below shows the scenes and cues with the musical numbers (or accompanying action) they contain. The numbers were not named by Prokofiev (except those used in the cantata), but are merely descriptive tags used here to help identify musical themes that repeat in two or more cues.

Note: A gray background indicates numbers omitted in the cantata.

Intertitle	Cue	Numbers and themes	Scoring
It was the 13th century...	1; Ravaged Rus'	Rus' under the Mongol Yoke	Orchestra
Lake Pleshcheyevo	2 "It happened on the Neva River"	Song about Alexander Nevsky	Chorus, orchestra
Lake Pleshcheyevo	3	Song about Alexander Nevsky	Chorus, orchestra
Lord Novgorod the Great	4	The Bells of Novgorod	Bells
Pskov	5; Pskov	The Crusaders in Pskov	Orchestra
Pskov	6	He Who Died a Noble Death for Rus'	Orchestra
Pskov	6	Horn Call of the Crusaders	Brass
Pskov	6	"Peregrinus expectavi"	Chorus, orchestra
Pskov	6	The Crusaders in Pskov	Orchestra
Pskov	6	Horn Call of the Crusaders	Brass
Pskov	6	He Who Died a Noble Death for Rus'	Orchestra
Pereyaslavl	7 "Arise, Russian People!"	"Arise, Russian People!"	Chorus, orchestra
Novgorod	8; Veche	In Our Native Rus'	Orchestra
Novgorod	9	In Our Native Rus'	Orchestra
Novgorod	10; Mobilization	"Arise, Russian People!"	Chorus, orchestra
Lake Chudskoye	11	The Crusaders' Camp ("Peregrinus expectavi")	Chorus, orchestra
Lake Chudskoye	12; Dawn	Alexander Nevsky's Camp (Rus' under the Mongol Yoke)	Orchestra
Lake Chudskoye	13	Fanfares	Brass
5 April 1242	14; Swine	Awaiting the Enemy at Raven's Rock	Orchestra
5 April 1242	14; Swine	Horn Call of the Crusaders	Brass
5 April 1242	14; Swine	Charge of the Crusaders	Chorus, orchestra
5 April 1242	15; Cavalry Attack	The Russian Counterattack	Orchestra
5 April 1242	16; The Square	The Skomorokhi	Orchestra
5 April 1242	16; The Square	Horn Call of the Crusaders	Brass
5 April 1242	16; The Square	"Peregrinus expectavi"	Chorus, orchestra
5 April 1242	16; The Square	Spears and Arrows	Orchestra
5 April 1242	17	Fanfare	Brass
5 April 1242	18; The Duel	Duel between Alexander and the Grand Master	Orchestra
5 April 1242	19; The Pursuit	The Crusaders Routed	Orchestra
5 April 1242	19; The Pursuit	The Ice Breaks	Percussion, orchestra
5 April 1242	20 "Answer, Bright Falcons!"	The Field of the Dead	Soloist, orchestra
5 April 1242	21	The Field of the Dead	Orchestra
Pskov	22; Entry into Pskov	The Bells of Pskov	Bells
Pskov	22; Entry into Pskov	The Fallen	Orchestra
Pskov	22; Entry into Pskov	The Prisoners	Orchestra
Pskov	22; Entry into Pskov	Song about Alexander Nevsky	Orchestra
Pskov	22; Entry into Pskov	In Our Native Rus'	Orchestra
Pskov	22; Entry into Pskov	The Prisoners	Orchestra
Pskov	22; Entry into Pskov	Song about Alexander Nevsky	Orchestra
Pskov	23	The Prisoners	Orchestra
Pskov	24	The Fallen	Orchestra
Pskov	25	"In Our Native Rus'"	Chorus, orchestra
Pskov	26; Sopeli	The Skomorokhi	Orchestra
Pskov	27; Finale	Song about Alexander Nevsky	Orchestra

The performance duration is approximately 55 minutes.

Repeating themes

The following themes occur in two or more cues.

1. 'Ravaged Rus'': 1, 12
2. "It happened on the Neva River": 2, 3, 22, 27
3. 'The Crusaders': 5, 6, 14, 16
4. 'He Who Died a Noble Death for Rus'': 6, 20
5. 'Horn Call of the Crusaders': 6, 14, 16, 19
6. "Peregrinus expectavi": 6, 11, 14, 16
7. "Arise, Russian people!": 7, 10
8. "To the living fighter esteem and honor": 7, 10, 15, 19
9. "In our native Rus'": 7, 8, 9, 10, 22, 25
10. "The enemy shall not occupy Rus'": 7, 10, 15, 19
11. 'Cavalry Attack': 15, 19
12. 'Skomorokhi': 16, 26
13. "I shall go over the white field": 20, 21, 22, 24
14. 'The Prisoners': 22, 23

== Alexander Nevsky, cantata, Op. 78 (1939) ==
=== Composition history ===
The great popularity of Eisenstein's film, which was released on 1 December 1938, may have prompted Prokofiev to create a concert version of the music in the winter of 1938–39. He condensed the 27 film score cues into a seven-movement cantata for contralto, chorus and orchestra lasting approximately 40 minutes. It is structured as follows:

No.	Title	English	Scoring
1	Русь под игом монгольским	Rus' under the Mongol Yoke	Orchestra
2	Песня об Александре Невском	Song about Alexander Nevsky	Chorus, orchestra
3	Крестоносцы во Пскове	The Crusaders in Pskov	Chorus, orchestra
4	Вставайте, люди русские!	Arise, Russian People!	Chorus, orchestra
5	Ледовое побоище	Battle on the Ice	Chorus, orchestra
6	Мёртвое поле	The Field of the Dead	Contralto soloist, orchestra
7	Въезд Александра во Псков	Alexander's Entry into Pskov	Chorus, orchestra

There are many changes in the cantata. Prokofiev remarked to sound engineer Boris Volskiy: "Sometimes it is easier to write a whole new piece than solder one together."

Once the film made it to the screen I had the desire to rework the music for symphonic orchestra and chorus. To create a cantata out of the music wasn't easy; I ended up expending much more labor on it than the original film. I first needed to provide it with an exclusively musical foundation, arranged in accord with the logic of musical form, with purely symphonic development, and then completely reorchestrated—since scoring for orchestra is of an entirely different [order] than scoring for a film. Despite my effort this second time around to approach the music from an exclusively symphonic perspective, the pictorial element from Eisenstein's film obviously remained. (22 March 1942)

Russian original

«После того, как фильм появился на экране, у меня возникло желание использовать музыку для симфонического произведения с хором. Это была нелегкая работа, и для того, чтобы сделать из этой музыки кантату, мне пришлось затратить гораздо более трудов, чем при первоначальном сочинении ее для фильма. Прежде всего требовалось подвести под нее чисто музыкальные основания, построить согласно музыкальной формы, развить ее чисто симфонически, затем все наново переоркестровать, ибо оркестровка симфоническая совсем другого порядка, чем оркестровка для фильма. Несмотря на мое старание подходить к музыке во время этой второй моей работы с чисто симфонической точки зрения, в ней остался известный элемент живописности, идущий от фильма и Эйзенштейна.»

Although some 15 minutes of music from the film score are omitted, the cuts mainly consist of repetitions, fragments and soundscape.

Omissions: The table above (under "Film score") shows the cues and numbers omitted from the cantata. There is no ad libitum bell tolling from the Novgorod and Pskov scenes. The 'Horn Call of the Crusaders' is no longer played as a free standing brass number, but is now combined with other themes as part of the orchestral texture. 'The Crusaders' Camp', being a repeat of the "Peregrinus expectavi" theme, is omitted. Two significant numbers featuring themes not presented elsewhere, 'Spears and Arrows' and all iterations of 'The Prisoners', are not included. Iterations of 'The Fallen' are omitted, perhaps because they are a restatement of the theme "I shall go over the white field" from 'The Field of the Dead'.

Abbreviations: About half the choral repetitions of stanzas of "Arise, Russian People!" are cut, as are all of the instrumental versions. The 'Charge of the Crusaders' is condensed, losing about half its length. The 'Duel' is greatly shortened (only the first 12 measures are preserved), and moved to an earlier position, alternating briefly with 'The Skomorokhi'.

Consolidation: Numbers broken into two cues by dialogue, such as 'Song about Alexander Nevsky' and 'The Field of the Dead', have their respective parts joined together. 'Rus' under the Mongol Yoke' now concludes with a repeat of the opening passage, possibly taken from 'Alexander Nevsky's Camp', giving the movement an ABA form.

Recomposition: 'The Ice Breaks', which depicts the crusaders perishing, consisting in the film score of percussive sound effects, is now replaced by a substantial section of new music (the Brohn version of the film score uses this and the new introduction to "Arise, Russian People!" as an opening credits prelude).

Expansion: The 'Finale' of the film score, rather perfunctorily performed by a modest studio orchestra without chorus, is, in the cantata, enlarged and transformed into a massive and glittering 'Final Chorus' with prominent brass and percussion section accompaniment.

Additions: The 'Song about Alexander Nevsky' gains a new third stanza ("Where the axe was swung, there was a street"). "Arise, Russian People!" gains a new introduction consisting of loud woodwind and brass chords, clanging bells, xylophone glissandi, and plucked strings. In 'The Battle on the Ice', there is now, after the 'Charge of the Crusaders', an added section depicting the commencement of fighting between the Livonian knights and the Russian defenders, with some additional Latin text ("Vincant arma crucifera! Hostis pereat!") 'The Battle on the Ice' now concludes with a quiet and poignant instrumental repeat of the "In our native Rus'" theme from "Arise, Russian People!". In 'The Field of the Dead', the first stanza, which is instrumental in the film score, now has an added vocal part ("I shall go over the white field") for the soloist. 'Alexander's Entry into Pskov' gains a new passage ("Rejoice, sing, mother Rus'!") depicting the people's celebration, with glockenspiel, xylophone, and harp accompaniment. Two more repetitions of "In our native Rus'" are added to 'Alexander's Entry into Pskov', one combined with the end of 'The Skomorokhi', and one following it, leading to the final stanza based on 'Song about Alexander Nevsky'.

Despite these many modifications, the order of events and music changes hardly at all, and the best music is not only preserved, but improved by larger instrumental forces, richer orchestration, added choral accompaniments, greater dynamic contrasts, and, obviously, greater continuity. Furthermore, in 'The Crusaders in Pskov', 'The Battle on the Ice', and 'Alexander's Entry into Pskov', Prokofiev indulges in more frequent juxtaposition and overlap of themes, resulting in greater rhythmic complexity and some jarring dissonances.

=== Publication history ===
- 1939 – 'Three songs from the film Alexander Nevsky', Op. 78a, Muzgiz, Moscow; the numbers were:
1. "Arise, Russian People"
2. "Answer, Bright Falcons" ('The Field of the Dead')
3. "It Happened on the Neva River" ('Song about Alexander Nevsky')
- 1941 – Alexander Nevsky, cantata for mezzo-soprano, mixed chorus, and orchestra, Op. 78, Muzgiz, Moscow

=== Performance history ===
The world premiere of the cantata took place on 17 May 1939. Sergei Prokofiev conducted the Moscow Philharmonic Orchestra and Chorus in the Great Hall of the Moscow Conservatory, with soloist Varvara Gagarina (mezzo-soprano).

The first American performance took place on 7 March 1943 in an NBC Radio broadcast. Leopold Stokowski conducted the NBC Symphony Orchestra and the Westminster Choir, with soloist Jennie Tourel (mezzo-soprano).

The American concert premiere took place on 23 March 1945, when Eugene Ormandy led the Philadelphia Orchestra and the Westminster Choir, with soloist Rosalind Nadell (contralto).

=== Instrumentation ===
- Strings: violins I & II, violas, cellos, double basses
- Woodwinds: piccolo, 2 flutes, 2 oboes, English horn, 2 clarinets, bass clarinet, tenor saxophone, 2 bassoons, contrabassoon
- Brass: 4 horns, 3 trumpets, 3 trombones, tuba
- Percussion: timpani, snare drum, bass drum, cymbals, tambourine, maracas, wood block, triangle, tubular bells, tamtam, glockenspiel, xylophone
- Other: harp

=== Movements ===
Video of a performance of "Song About Alexander Nevsky", second movement of Alexander Nevsky cantata. Performers: St Matthew's Concert Choir. length: 2 min 54 sec

1. "Rus' under the Mongol Yoke": The opening movement begins slowly, and in C minor. It is meant to evoke an image of destruction, as brought to Rus' by the invading Mongols.
2. "Song about Alexander Nevsky": This movement (B♭) represents Prince Alexander Yaroslavich's victory over the Swedish army at the Battle of the Neva in 1240. Alexander received the name 'Nevsky' ("of the Neva") in tribute.
3. "The Crusaders in Pskov": For this movement (C♯ minor), Prokofiev's initial intention was to use genuine 13th century church music; however, the examples he found in the Moscow Conservatoire sounded so cold, dull and alien to the 20th century ear that he abandoned the idea and instead composed an original theme "better suited to our modern conception" to evoke the brutality of the Teutonic Knights.
4. "Arise, Russian People": This movement (E♭) represents a call to arms for the people of Russia. It is composed with folk overtones.
5. "The Battle on the Ice": The fifth (and longest) movement is arguably the climax of the cantata. It represents the final clash between Nevsky's forces and the Teutonic Knights on the frozen surface of Lake Peipus in 1242. The quietly ominous beginning (representing dawn on the day of battle) is contrasted by the jarring middle section, which is cacophonous in style.
6. "The Field of the Dead": Composed in C minor, the sixth movement is the lament of a girl seeking her lost lover, as well as kissing the eyelids of all the dead. The vocal solo is performed by a mezzo-soprano.
7. "Alexander's Entry into Pskov": The seventh and final movement (B♭) echoes the second movement in parts, and recalls Alexander's triumphant return to Pskov.

=== Text analysis ===
The Latin text devised by Prokofiev for the Livonian knights appears at first sight to be random and meaningless:

"Peregrinus expectavi, pedes meos in cymbalis" [A pilgrim I waited, my feet in cymbals]

According to Prokofiev, "the Teutonic knights sing Catholic psalms as they march into battle." In 1994, Dr. Morag G. Kerr, a soprano with the BBC Symphony Chorus, was the first to notice that the words are indeed from the Psalms, specifically from the Vulgate texts chosen by Igor Stravinsky for his 1930 Symphony of Psalms. Dr. Kerr believes Prokofiev may have felt a temptation to put the words of his rival into the mouths of the one-dimensional Teutonic villains of Eisenstein's film. This explanation has been accepted by the BBC: "Even their words are gibberish, with Prokofiev rather mischievously creating them by chopping up Latin texts from Stravinsky’s Symphony of Psalms and then randomly stringing them together". In the 'Battle on the Ice', the Latin phrase Prokofiev concocted ends with est, which is not found in Symphony of Psalms, but is possibly a pun on the first letters of Stravinsky's surname in Latin characters (Prokofiev enjoyed such games).

A motive for this nonsensical parody may be found in the lifelong rivalry between the two Russian composers, specifically in the younger man (Prokofiev's) dismissal of Stravinsky's idiom as backward-looking "pseudo-Bachism", and his disdain for Stravinsky's choice to remain in western Europe, in contrast to Prokofiev's own return to Stalinist Russia in 1935.

== Versions by other hands ==
=== Film score reconstruction by William Brohn (1987) ===
Composition history

In 1987, orchestrator William Brohn created a version of Alexander Nevsky that could replace the widely derided original soundtrack in showings of the film accompanied by a live symphony orchestra. Producer John Goberman provides the following details concerning the genesis of the Brohn version:

[Prokofiev] had orchestrated his score for a small recording studio orchestra, intending to achieve orchestral balances through miking techniques... However, partly because of Prokofiev's intent to experiment with the new soundstage recording techniques, the soundtrack for Alexander Nevsky is a disaster. Ironically, the best film score ever written is probably the worst soundtrack ever recorded. The intonation of the instruments and of the chorus is sad, and the frequency range is limited to 5,000 Herz (as opposed to an industry standard of 20,000 Hz). This in the period when Hollywood was turning out Gone with the Wind and Disney's Fantasia.

... In 1986, realizing that the Cantata contained virtually all the musical ideas of the film, I considered the possibility of overcoming the limitations of the original soundtrack by finding a way to perform this most monumental of all film scores with a full symphony orchestra and chorus accompanying the film in the concert hall. Crucial to the approach was that in the Cantata we had Prokofiev's own orchestration. If we could work out the technical issues, we could achieve a completely authentic re-creation of the film score which would allow audiences to hear what Prokofiev heard when he saw the magnificent images created by Eisenstein.

I engaged the brilliant orchestrator (and my good friend) Bill Brohn to use the cantata to re-create the film score, both of us committed to the authenticity of the project from the beginning.

... So here, more than 50 years after the conception of Alexander Nevsky, we can witness the extraordinary visual imagination of Prokofiev captured in a soundtrack recording of what is probably the greatest film score ever written, in the authentic and unmistakable musical hand of its author."

At the time the Brohn version was written, Prokofiev's original manuscripts of the film score were unavailable for study. Brohn transcribed the score, using the orchestration of the cantata as a model. Music not present in the cantata was transcribed by ear from the film. With special attention paid to tempos, a 1993 recording of this version was matched to a new edition of the film, which was released in 1995.

Although the Brohn version is not technically the film score as composed by Prokofiev, it is substitutes the original soundtrack for live performances by a full symphony orchestra accompanying showings of the film. There is little in the arrangement that is not by Prokofiev. However, it is more accurate to say that this arrangement is a "hybrid" of the film score and the cantata, allowing the audience the opportunity to enjoy the film score cues using the expanded sound values of the cantata.

Performance history

The Brohn version premiered on 3 November 1987 at the Dorothy Chandler Pavilion in Los Angeles. André Previn conducted the Los Angeles Philharmonic and the Los Angeles Master Chorale, with soloist Christine Cairns (mezzo-soprano).

Instrumentation

- Strings: violins I & II, violas, cellos, double basses
- Woodwinds: piccolo, 2 flutes, 2 oboes, English horn, 2 clarinets, bass clarinet, tenor saxophone, 2 bassoons, contrabassoon
- Brass: 4 horns, 3 trumpets, 3 trombones, tuba
- Percussion: timpani, snare drum, tom-tom, bass drum, cymbals, gong, tambourine, maracas, woodblock, anvil, steel plate, triangle, tubular bells, glockenspiel, xylophone
- Other: harp, organ

== Recordings ==
The first recording of the film score reconstructed from the original manuscripts was made in 2003 by Frank Strobel conducting the Berlin Radio Symphony Orchestra and released on Capriccio Records.

Year	Conductor	Orchestra and choir	Soloist	Version	Label
1947	Samuil Samosud	Russian State Radio Orchestra and Chorus	Lyudmila Legostayeva (mezzo-soprano)	Cantata	Westminster WN 18144
1949	Eugene Ormandy	Philadelphia Orchestra, Westminster Choir	Jennie Tourel (mezzo-soprano)	Cantata (English)	Columbia Masterworks ML 4247
1954	Mario Rossi	Vienna State Opera Orchestra and Chorus	Ana Maria Iriarte (mezzo-soprano)	Cantata	Fontana BIG.331-L; Vanguard VRS-451
1959	Fritz Reiner	Chicago Symphony Orchestra and Chorus	Rosalind Elias (mezzo-soprano)	Cantata (English)	RCA Victor Red Seal LSC-2395
1962	Karel Ančerl	Czech Philharmonic, Prague Philharmonic Choir	Věra Soukupová (mezzo-soprano)	Cantata	Supraphon SUA 10429; Turnabout TV 34269
1962	Thomas Schippers	New York Philharmonic, Westminster Choir	Lili Chookasian (contralto)	Cantata	Columbia Masterworks MS 6306; CBS Classics 61769
1966	Yevgeny Svetlanov	USSR Symphony Orchestra, RSFSR Chorus	Larisa Avdeyeva (mezzo-soprano)	Cantata	Мелодия MEL CD 10 01831
1971	André Previn	London Symphony Orchestra and Chorus	Anna Reynolds (contralto)	Cantata	His Master's Voice ASD 2800, Angel Records S-36843
1975	Eugene Ormandy	Philadelphia Orchestra, The Mendelssohn Club of Philadelphia	Betty Allen (mezzo-soprano)	Cantata	RCA Red Seal ARL1-1151
1979	Leonard Slatkin	St. Louis Symphony Orchestra and Chorus	Claudine Carlson (mezzo-soprano)	Cantata	Mobile Fidelity Sound Lab UDSACD 4009
1980	Claudio Abbado	London Symphony Orchestra and Chorus	Elena Obraztsova (mezzo-soprano)	Cantata	Deutsche Grammophon 0289-447-4192-6
1984	Riccardo Chailly	Cleveland Orchestra and Chorus	Irina Arkhipova (mezzo-soprano)	Cantata	Decca – 410 164-1
1987	André Previn	Los Angeles Philharmonic, Los Angeles Master Chorale	Christine Cairns (mezzo-soprano)	Cantata	Telarc CD-80143
1988	Neeme Järvi	Scottish National Orchestra and Chorus	Linda Finnie (mezzo-soprano)	Cantata	Chandos CHAN 8584
1991	Dmitri Kitayenko	Danish National Radio Symphony Orchestra and Chorus	Lyudmila Shemchuk (mezzo-soprano)	Cantata	Chandos CHAN 9001
1991	Kurt Masur	Gewandhausorchester Leipzig, Latvija Choir	Carolyn Watkinson (mezzo-soprano)	Cantata	Teldec Classics 9031-73284-2
1992	Charles Dutoit	Choeur et Orchestre symphonique de Montréal	Jard van Nes (contralto)	Cantata	Decca London Records 430 506-2
1993	Eduardo Mata	Dallas Symphony Orchestra and Chorus	Mariana Paunova (mezzo-soprano)	Cantata	
1993	Zdeněk Mácal	Milwaukee Symphony Orchestra and Chorus	Janice Taylor (mezzo-soprano)	Cantata	
1994	Semyon Bychkov	Choeur et orchestre de Paris	Marjana Lipovšek (mezzo-soprano)	Cantata	
1994	Jean-Claude Casadesus	Orchestre national de Lille, Latvian State Choir	Ewa Podleś (contralto)	Cantata	
1995	Yuri Temirkanov	Saint Petersburg Philharmonic Orchestra, Chorus of the Saint Petersburg Teleradio Company, Chamber Chorus of Saint Petersburg, Saint Petersburg Chorus Capella "LIK"	Yevgeniya Gorokhovskaya (mezzo-soprano)	Brohn	RCA Victor, also available on VHS and Laserdisc versions of the film released the same year
2002	Valery Gergiev	Kirov Orchestra and Chorus of the Mariinsky Theatre	Olga Borodina (mezzo-soprano)	Cantata	Philips 289 473 600-2
2002	Dmitry Yablonsky	Russian State Symphony Orchestra, Stanislavskiy Chorus	Irina Gelakhova (mezzo-soprano)	Cantata	
2003	Frank Strobel	Rundfunk-Sinfonieorchester Berlin, Ernst Senff Chor	Marina Domashenko (mezzo-soprano)	Film score	Capriccio SACD 71 014
