= Marina Domashenko =

Russian operatic mezzo-soprano (born 1979)

- Марина Домашенко
- Born: 1979 (age 46–47); Kemerovo, USSR
- Education: Kemerovo School of Music, Yekaterinburg Conservatory
- Occupation: operatic mezzo-soprano
- Years active: 1998–present

Marina Domashenko (Russian: Марина Домашенко; born 1979) is a Russian operatic mezzo-soprano.

Domashenko was born into a musical family in the Siberian town Kemerovo. She graduated with honours from the Kemerovo School of Music where she studied piano and conducting, and from the Yekaterinburg Conservatory where she studied opera singing.

== Career ==
The role of Olga in Tchaikovsky's Eugene Onegin at the Prague State Opera in 1998 was Domashenko's European debut. She returned the next season to sing Polina in Tchaikovsky's The Queen of Spades, the title role in Bizet's Carmen, and Dorabella in Mozart's Così fan tutte. In 1999 she toured Japan with the Prague National Theatre with Carmen.

Domashenko's performances in 1999/2000 included Puccini's Suor Angelica at the Concertgebouw in Amsterdam, Olga in Tchaikovsky's Eugene Onegin in Moscow, Prokofiev's cantata Alexander Nevsky in Athens and at the Teatro La Fenice in Venice, as well as Carmen in Cagliari and solo concerts in Greece.

Domashenko's American debut was in 2000 at the San Francisco Opera where she performed Delilah in Saint-Saëns' Samson and Delilah at a gala concert with Plácido Domingo. She returned to that house with Carmen in 2002 and sang that role at Opera Philadelphia. At the end of 2000, she sang Orlovski in Die Fledermaus and Polina at the Opéra Bastille in Paris, a role which she sang in 2002 at the Teatro Comunale di Bologna. Other roles in 2002 include Fenena in Verdi's Nabucco at the Vienna State Opera and the Deutsche Oper Berlin, a role she also performed at the Metropolitan Opera. In 2007 she sang in Francis Poulenc's La voix humaine and in Jules Massenet's Le portrait de Manon at the Gran Teatre del Liceu in Barcelona. In June 2010, she sang Carmen at the Royal Opera House, London, directed by Francesca Zambello.

Other roles include Lyubasha in Rimsky-Korsakov's The Tsar's Bride at the San Francisco Opera and the Zürich Opera House, Adalgisa in Bellini's Norma, Maddalena in Verdi's Rigoletto at the Royal Opera House, Sesto in Mozart's La clemenza di Tito with the Washington National Opera in 2006.

Concert performances include Rossini's Stabat Mater at the Festival de Montpellier in 2000, Janáček's Glagolitic Mass with the London Symphony Orchestra and Sir Colin Davis at the Barbican Centre in London and in New York at the Lincoln Center, Mussorgsky's Songs and Dances of Death with the New York Philharmonic conducted by Riccardo Chailly at Avery Fisher Hall in New York; Khatchaturian's "Ode of Joy" at Carnegie Hall, Verdi's Requiem in the Abbey of Saint Gall and the Vienna State Opera.

== Awards ==
She won first prizes at the 32nd International Antonín Dvořák Singing Competition in Karlovy Vary, Czech Republic, in 1997, and at the Concorso Internazionale per Giovani Cantanti d'Opera (International Competition for Young Opera Singers) "Gianfranco Masini" in Reggio Emilia, Italy, in 1999. In 2002 she won the Diva Award of Opera Philadelphia.

The recording of Verdi's Falstaff with Domashenko, conducted by Sir Colin Davis, won the Grammy Award for Best Opera Recording in 2006.

== Recordings ==
- 2001 Marina Domashenko, opera arias, Philharmonia of Russia, Constantine Orbelian conducting, Delos DE3285
- 2002 The Queens of Spades (Tchaikovsky), with Dmitri Hvorostovsky, Philharmonia of Russia, Constantine Orbelian conducting, Delos DE3289
- 2003 "Ode of Joy" (Khatchaturian, 1956) on Spartacus, Philharmonia of Russia, Constantine Orbelian conducting, Delos DE3328
- 2003 Hamlet / Boris Godunov (Prokofiev), Berlin Radio Symphony Orchestra, Michail Jurowski conducting, Capriccio C67058
- 2003 The Tsar's Bride (Rimsky-Korsakov) with Dmitri Hvorostovsky, Konstantine Orbelian, conducting
- 2003 The Queens of Spades by Tchaikovsky, Gran Teatre del Liceu
- 2003 Carmen (film), from the Arena di Verona, director: Franco Zeffirelli
- 2004 Alexander Nevsky (Prokofiev), Berlin Radio Symphony Orchestra, Frank Strobel conducting, Capriccio C71014
- 2004 Raffaello (Anton Arensky, 1894), excerpts and other Arensky arias, Philharmonia of Russia, Constantine Orbelian conducting, Delos DE3319
- 2006 Tchaikovsky Duets: Domashenko and Guryakova, Philharmonia of Russia, Constantine Orbelian conducting, Delos
- 2006 Falstaff (Verdi), London Symphony Orchestra, Sir Colin Davis conducting (Grammy 2006 winner)
- 2006 Carmen (film), conducted by Daniel Barenboim, Rolando Villazón as Don José, Staatsoper unter den Linden
- 2010 Opera Gala 35th Anniversary Opera Gala, a tribute to Delos founder, Amelia S. Haygood, Delos DE3395
- 2010 Carmen: Duets & Arias, with Andrea Bocelli, Bryn Terfel, Orchestre philharmonique de Radio France, Myung-whun Chung conducting, Decca
