= Carmen: Duets & Arias =

Studio album by Andrea Bocelli
- Released: July 12, 2010
- Recorded: 2005
- Genres: Opera; classical
- Labels: Decca, Universal
- Producer: Daniel Zalay

Andrea Bocelli chronology
My Christmas (2009)	Carmen: Duets & Arias (2010)	Notte Illuminata (2011)

Cover of the complete opera recording of Carmen, first released in 2008, in Italy and in 2010 Internationally

Carmen: Duets & Arias is an album released in 2010 by Italian tenor, Andrea Bocelli. The album is a collection of arias of Georges Bizet's opera Carmen, including duets with Welsh bass-baritone, Bryn Terfel, Russian mezzo-soprano Marina Domashenko, and Italian soprano Eva Mei, from the French opéra comique.

== Background ==
In 2005, Bocelli recorded the opera Carmen. Myung-whun Chung conducted the Orchestre Philharmonique de Radio France and the Chœur de Radio France for the recording. Welsh bass-baritone Bryn Terfel, mezzo-soprano Marina Domashenko, and soprano Eva Mei, were also part of the Ensemble.

In 2008, Bocelli played the role of Don José on stage, opposite Hungarian mezzo-soprano Ildikó Komlósi, as Carmen, at the Teatro dell'Opera di Roma, in Rome, for four nights, from June 17 to June 28. Bocelli released the complete opera recording of Carmen, in Italy, in the same year.

In March 2010, the recording was released Internationally. Carmen: Duets & Arias contains highlights of arias and duets of that recording.

== Ensemble ==
- Carmen – Marina Domashenko
- Don José – Andrea Bocelli
- Micaëla – Eva Mei
- Escamillo – Bryn Terfel
- Zuniga – Thierry Félix
- Moralès – Jean-Luc Ballestra
- Frasquita – Magali Léger
- Mercédès – Delphine Haidan
- Le Dancaïre – Olivier Lallouette
- Le Remendado – Alain Gabriel
- Conductor – Myung-whun Chung
- Orchestre Philharmonique de Radio France
- Choeur de Radio France – Chorus Master: Yves Parmentier
- Maîtrise de Radio France – Chorus Master: Toni Ramon

== Track listing ==
1. "Prelude"
2. "Habanera: L'amour est un oiseau rebelle"
3. "Carmen! Sur tes pas nous nous pressons tous!"
4. "Parle-moi de ma mère!"
5. "Que son fils l'aime et la vénère"
6. "Seguidilla: Près des remparts de Séville"
7. "Toreador Song: Votre toast, je peux vous le rendre"
8. "Halte-là! Qui va là?"
9. "Je vais danser en votre honneur"
10. "Flower Song: La fleur que tu m'avais jetée"
11. "Non! Tu ne m'aimes pas!"
12. "Holà! Carmen!"
13. "Je dis que rien ne m'épouvante"
14. "Je suis Escamillo"
15. "Holà! holà! José!"
16. "Halte! quelqu'un est là"
17. "C'est toi!"

== Reception ==
=== Critical reception ===
Professional ratings
Review scores
Source	Rating
The Independent	4/5 stars
Entertainment Weekly	C+
AllMusic	4/5 stars

Andy Gill from the British newspaper, The Independent, gave the complete opera recording a 4 out of 5 stars rating, writing that, "the world's most popular tenor, in the world's most popular opera? Do you suppose this will sell? Decca aren't taking any chances anyway, making it available as a complete CD set with full libretto, and as a single-disc collection of Duets & Arias. The peculiar tragic nobility of Bocelli's voice is perfectly suited to the role of Don José, but the clinching elements are the supporting performances, particularly Marina Domashenko in the title role, whose plummily graceful tones bring just the right note of quixotic disdain to the part; and Bryn Terfel, who delivers the "Toreador's Song" with a swashbuckling gusto."

Stephen Eddins from AllMusic also gave the complete opera recording a 4 out of 5 stars rating, writing that, "Bocelli is most successful in the music that allows him to sing sweetly, such as his Act I interactions with Micaëla, but his Don José is always believably human; he, more fully than Domashenko, embodies his character's development, particularly his growing desperation. His lack of vocal consistency is problematic, but at his best here, the fullness his tone, and the discipline of his phrasing might well surprise his critics."

On the other hand, Joe Banno of The Washington Post gave an unfavorable review of the recording, mentioning the oft-noted failings in Bocelli's vocal resources on full display in this performance: "Bocelli, to be fair, possesses an essentially lovely tenor and knows his stuff when it comes to selling a pop ballad. And Decca's close miking of his puny voice inflates his sound to near-Franco Corelli-like dimensions. But his short-breathed, clumsily phrased, interpretively blank and often pinched and strained singing makes his Don Jose a tough listen."

=== Chart performance ===
For Carmen: Duets & Arias

Chart (2010)	Peak position
Belgium Albums (Wa)	18
Finish Albums	28
French Albums	110
Irish Albums	83

Chart (2010)	Peak position
Canadian Classical Albums	1
U.S. Classical Albums	2

For the complete opera recording

Chart (2010)	Peak position
Greek Albums	45
Polish Albums	47
