= Notte Illuminata =

Studio album by Andrea Bocelli
- Released: 8 February 2011
- Genre: Classical crossover
- Length: 52:56
- Label: Decca

Andrea Bocelli chronology
Carmen: Duets & Arias (2010)	Notte Illuminata (2011)	Concerto, One Night in Central Park (2011)

Notte Illuminata is an album released in 2011 by Italian tenor, Andrea Bocelli.

A collection of arias in German, French, Italian and English, the album is Bocelli's first to be released only digitally.

== Notte Illuminata Tour ==
The Notte Illuminata Tour was launched in Pisa, at the Teatro Verdi, December 2010. This was followed by three concerts given in January, in Munich, Berlin, and Hamburg, Germany. In February, Bocelli made his Metropolitan Opera debut, performing a recital, as part of the tour.

== Track listing ==
1. La speme ti consoli - 3:26
2. Where e'er you walk - 4:08
3. Sound an Alarm - 2:40
4. Dimmi, ben mio, che m'ami - 1:59
5. L'amante impaziente - 1:23
6. Beato quei che fido amor - 2:30
7. Ich liebe dich - 2:14
8. Der Engel - 2:26
9. Oh! Quand Je Dors - 3:46
10. Zueignung - 1:45
11. Mai - 3:14
12. Chanson D'amour - 1:59
13. Après un rêve - 3:27
14. La lune blanche luit dans les bois - 2:27
15. Le secret - 1:41
16. Mandoline - 1:49
17. Hymne à la nuit - 3:25
18. À la Madone - 2:25
19. Invocation - 3:01
20. La reine du matin - 3:11
