= La velata =

Painting by Raphael

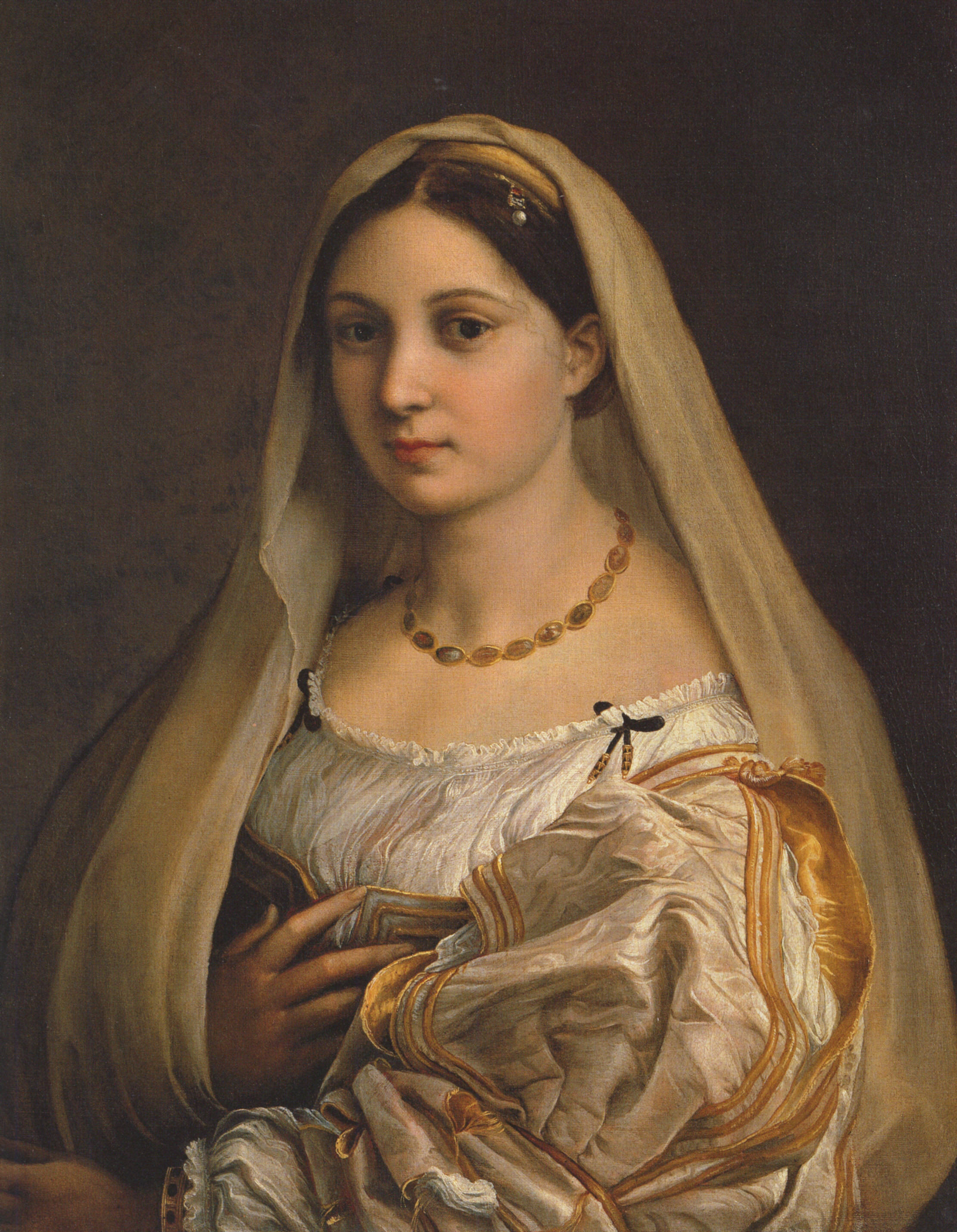
- Artist: Raphael
- Year: c. 1516
- Medium: Oil on canvas
- Dimensions: 82 cm × 60.5 cm (32 in × 23.8 in)
- Location: Palatine Gallery, Palazzo Pitti; Florence

La velata, or La donna velata ("The woman with the veil"), is a well known portrait by the Italian Renaissance painter Raffaello Sanzio, more commonly known as Raphael. The subject of the painting appears in another portrait, La Fornarina, and is traditionally identified as the fornarina (bakeress) Margherita Luti, Raphael's Roman mistress.

As usual with Raphael, the subject's clothing is chosen and painted with close attention; here it is strikingly opulent.

== See also ==
- List of paintings by Raphael
