= Johann Traeg =

German music copyist and publisher (1747–1805)

Johann Traeg (20 January 1747 – 5 September 1805) was a German music copyist and publisher who flourished in Vienna in the late 18th century. He had business dealings with Haydn, Mozart and Beethoven, and his catalogs and advertisements are still employed today as a source for historical musicology.

== Life and career ==
He was born in Gochsheim in Bavaria, and had moved to Vienna by 1779. He began his work simply by offering hand copies of musical works, working out of his home. This was possible even in the late 18th century, for as Jones notes, Austria was at the time not very technologically advanced in this respect:

Music-printing was becoming increasingly widespread in the 18th century ... In those areas of Europe like Britain, France, and northern Germany, where music-publishing was well established, printed copies of instrumental music became the principal means of dissemination ... On the other hand, in [other] parts of Europe, principally the Austrian monarchy, southern Germany, Italy, and the Iberian peninsula, ... copying of music by hand remained the principal means of dissemination for all music through Haydn's lifetime [1732–1809].

As Jones has elsewhere pointed out, what set Traeg apart from most professional copyists was his assiduous compilation of what became a vast library of music from which he could offer copies for sale. Jones suggests that the several changes of residence recorded for Traeg in his advertisements may have been needed to house the expanding collection, and indeed Traeg eventually moved his family out to the suburbs and placed the collection in his own shop, whose opening was advertised 16 May 1789, and which became a destination for Viennese music-lovers for the rest of his life.

As of 9 April 1794, Traeg entered the publication business per se, with issue of printed copies of quartets by Joseph Eybler; this business eventually flourished. Traeg retained his offerings of hand-copied music, however. Starting no later than 1789, he served as the Vienna agent of the important Leipzig publisher Breitkopf & Härtel.

Austria had no copyright law until the 19th century and Traeg was perfectly free to acquire copies from any source of whatever music he liked and offer hand copies of them for sale without compensation to the composer. Jones estimates, for instance, that Traeg at his peak had 500 works by Joseph Haydn on offer, none of which provided Haydn with any income. Nevertheless, Haydn occasionally dealt with Traeg on a business basis, though there is evidence he was not pleased with the situation; see below.

=== His catalogue ===
In 1799, Traeg's firm created a catalog listing all the items that were available for purchase at the time, indicating which were obtainable in print and which in custom hand-copy. The catalog runs to 233 pages and by Edge's "conservative" estimate contains at least 10,000 musical works by hundreds of composers. A supplement to the catalog was issued in 1804. The catalogs have been re-published in modern times as a resource for historical musicology, along with the set of advertisements that Traeg took out in the newspaper Wiener Zeitung.

Summarizing what music was available from Traeg's business, Edge writes:

In contrast to [other copyists], Traeg specialized in instrumental music, including an extremely wide variety of arrangements. He also made a specialty of "old" music (from a late eighteenth-century perspective, anything composed before roughly 1775), and he occasionally advertised works by such composers as Corelli and Handel. Traeg also seems to have been the only commercial copyist in Vienna who dealt to any significant degree in sacred music ... the wide variety of offerings in Traeg's catalogue of 1799 seem to suggest that he maintained close contacts with music publishers and dealers throughout Europe.

=== Later years ===
Starting in about 1800, the music copying part of the business was deemphasized in favor of printed offerings. In his later years Traeg carried out his business in collaboration with his son, also named Johann Traeg (15 September 1781 – after 1831); as of October 1803 the firm was named "Johann Traeg und Sohn".

Traeg died on 5 September 1805; his fatal disease was described as Brustwassersucht (pulmonary dropsy). The family business continued to prosper under the son for some time but eventually withered against strong competition and folded in 1820.

== Dealings with celebrated composers ==
=== Haydn ===
Joseph Haydn mostly entrusted publication of his works to others, but in old age he did have Traeg publish his late piano trio, H. XVI:31 (1803). Concerning the issue of Traeg and intellectual property, Jones narrates the following small act of revenge on Haydn's part, from the same year:

The vast majority of [Traeg's] material was acquired independently of the composer. These were characteristics of contemporary musical life that Haydn would have accepted but in 1803 it led to a quarrel between composer and dealer. Traeg had acquired from a member of the Erdödy family several autograph scores of Haydn's operas, including L'isola disabitata. Breitkopf & Härtel had expressed an interest in publishing the opera and Haydn borrowed the autograph score from Traeg; after a while Traeg asked that the score be either returned or purchased. Haydn did neither and gave the dealer a dressing down in front of several mutual acquaintances.

=== Mozart ===
Traeg periodically offered works by Mozart for sale in his advertisements in the Wiener Zeitung. He was the first (27 Sept. 1783) to offer copies of the Piano Concertos K. 413, K. 414, and K. 415 after the Paris publisher Jean Georges Sieber had turned them down. Halliwell (1998) raises the possibility that the Traeg issue of the concertos may have been not a backup business arrangement with Mozart but rather simply pirated. But Edge makes the case that at least some of Traeg's Mozart offerings were in fact created from material acquired from Mozart himself, and thus presumably involved remuneration.

Traeg was ... in possession of an exceptionally wide variety of works by Mozart, and he was often able to advertise them in the Wiener Zeitung at quite an early date, often not long after the composer finished them or received them from [his childhood home in] Salzburg. Under these circumstances, it seems more than plausible that he acquired them directly from the composer.

Cliff Eisen suggests that following Mozart's death (5 December 1791), Traeg may have been involved in important dealings with his widow Constanze. At the time Constanze was faced with a very serious financial situation in light of having two children, the debts her husband left, and (at first) no pension income. Eisen writes:

There is good reason to think that Traeg might have acquired [manuscripts of Mozart's compositions] from Constanze, shortly after Mozart's death in December 1791. As early as April 1792 Traeg offered for sale copies of 14 Mozart symphonies; this number was augmented to 15 in August, at which time Traeg also offered an enormous collection of Masses, concertos for piano, violin and horn, cassations, partitas for winds, a horn quintet, the duos for violin and viola, more than 30 dances, and 'various' arias, in score, with Italian texts. Where could such a large selection – including many works previously not sold in Vienna – suddenly have come from, except Mozart's estate?

Edge spells out what may have been happening, and partially endorses Eisen's hypothesis: "One can easily imagine that Constanze, suddenly faced with the prospect of supporting herself and two children while attempting to sort out her deceased husband's chaotic finances, might quickly have decided to sell some of what seemed to her the less obviously important items from her husband's collection in order to raise ready cash. Although there is currently no direct evidence to support this conjecture, it is at least plausible."

Later on, Constanze's dealings with Traeg were less substantial; once her financial situation had become more secure she dealt more often with out-of-town publishers such as Breitkopf & Härtel and Johann Anton André. However, Traeg did issue the first edition (1798) of the Mozart's String Quintet K. 174 (1773), as well a four-hand piano edition of the Fantasia for Mechanical Organ K. 608.

=== Beethoven ===
Traeg published a fair number of Beethoven's works; particularly early in his career. For the most part, these were works that Beethoven did not assign the dignity of an opus number. The material includes variation sets on themes by other composers, a popular genre. As with Constanze Mozart's choices, the most important works largely went to other publishers. A partial listing of Traeg's Beethoven publications follows.

- Song "Zärtliche Liebe" WoO123 (1795)
- Song "La partenza" WoO124 (1795)
- Variations for cello and piano on Mozart's "Ein Mädchen oder Weibchen" from The Magic Flute, Op. 66 (1796)

According to Kalischer, Beethoven was an inveterate punster, and when the appropriate occasion arose (late delivery by Traeg of some free offerings from Breitkopf & Härtel) Beethoven did not hesitate to make a pun out of the literal meaning of Traeg's name: "with Herr Traeg everything is slow" [German "träg"].
