= La Fornarina =

Painting by Raphael

Portrait of a Young Woman
- La fornarina (Italian)
- Artist: Raphael
- Year: 1518–1519
- Medium: Oil on wood
- Dimensions: 85 cm × 60 cm (33 in × 24 in)
- Location: Galleria Nazionale d'Arte Antica, Rome

The Portrait of a Young Woman (also known as La fornarina) is a painting by the Italian High Renaissance master Raphael, made between 1518 and 1519. It is in the Galleria Nazionale d'Arte Antica in Palazzo Barberini, Rome.

It is probable that the picture was in the painter's studio at his death in 1520, and that it was modified and then sold by his assistant Giulio Romano.

Art-history tradition or legend identifies the woman as the fornarina ("baker" or "baker's daughter") Margherita Luti, Raphael's Roman lover who refused to marry him, though this identification has been questioned. An alternative view sees the work not as a portrait of a specific woman, but rather as Raphael's interpretation of a belle donne genre and a depiction of a courtesan. Still another interpretation identifies the figure as a witch.

== Description ==
=== Description of painting ===
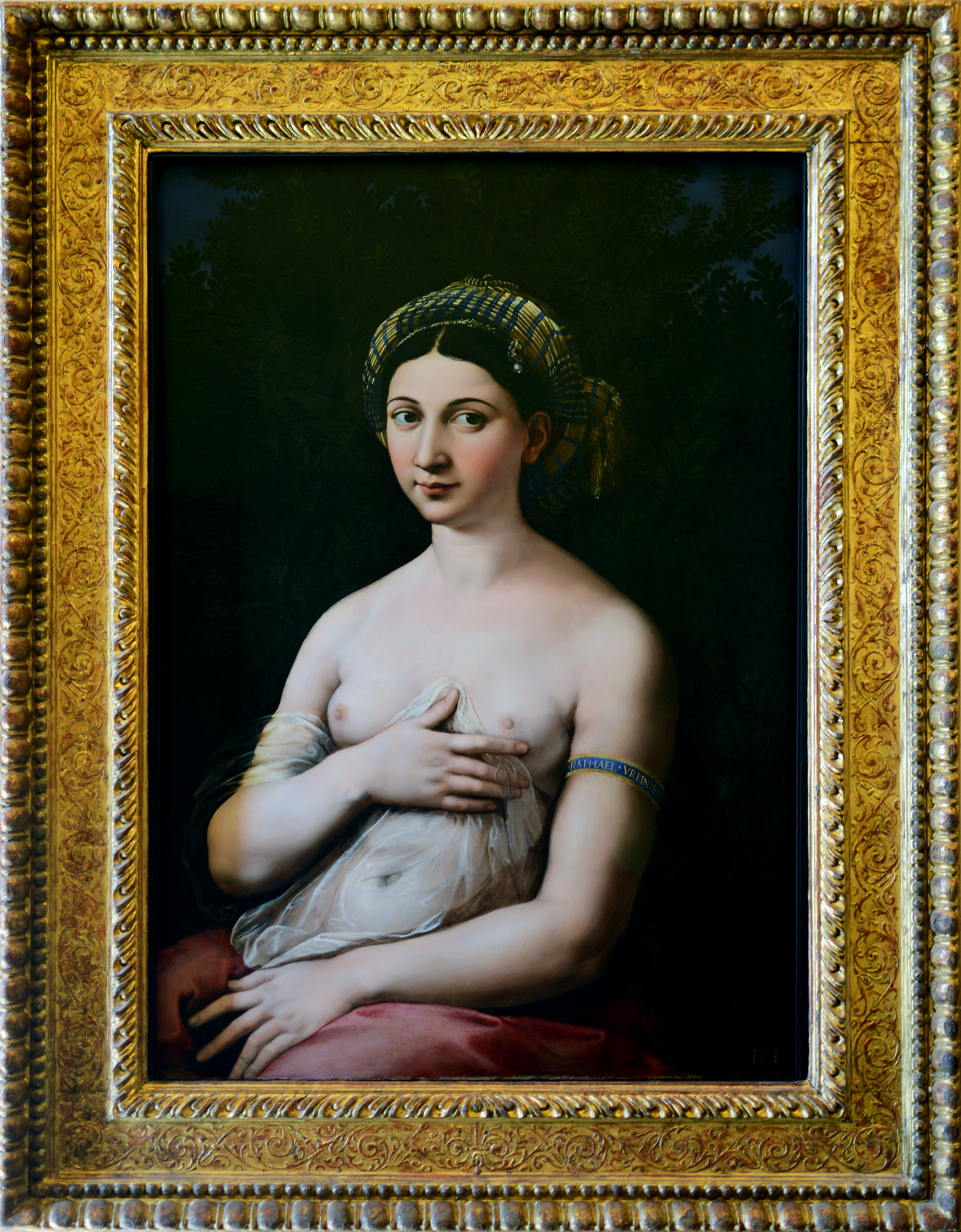
View of La Fornarina with frame

The painting depicts a nude woman wearing a thin veil to cover her lower abdomen and is seen half covering her left breast. She wears a blue and yellow turban over her dark hair; a thicker red cloth covers her legs and genital region. The figure appears healthy with smooth skin, full proportions and a faint pink tint in her cheeks. Her eyes are looking towards the left, and she wears a small, possibly amused smile. La Fornarina is also wearing an armband engraved with the painter's signature, "Raphael Vrbinas".

=== Technical analysis ===
X-ray analyses have shown that in the background was originally a Leonardesque-style landscape in place of the myrtle bush, which was sacred to Venus, goddess of love and passion. An overpainted ruby ring on the sitter's third left finger has caused speculation on whether there might have been a secret marriage with Raphael.

=== Copies ===
According to an explanation on the museum website, there are two copies of La Fornarina in the Borghese Gallery in Rome. La Fornarina (The Portrait of a Young Woman) is a painting by the Italian High Renaissance master Raphael, made between 1518 and 1519. It is an oil-on-panel with 86 x 58 cm dimensions, located in Room IX of the Borghese Gallery. In Olimpia Aldobrandini's two inventories (1626 and 1682), the art work is attributed to Raphael. It is, however, a copy after the famous portrait entitled La Fornarina, now in the Galleria Barberini in Rome." The other copy is "attributed to Giulio Romano, came to the Galleria Borghese with the fidei-commissum of 1833. This work of art has been recently ascribed to Raffaellino del Colle. The picture was likely within the painter's studio at his death in 1520, which was adjusted and sold by his assistant Giulio Romano. In the 16th century, the picture was within the house of the Countess of Santafiora, a Roman noblewoman, and in this way got to be the property of Duke Boncompagni and then of the Galleria Nazionale, which still has it." This second copy is almost the same as the original painting in the Galleria Barberini except that there is no ring on her left, fourth finger.

== Identity of the figure ==
=== Belle donne theme ===
Joanna Woods-Marsden has chosen to view the painting through the belle donne theme, describing it as a representation of idealistic beauty. With this interpretation, it is more likely that a viewer could assume that this is not Raphael's lover, but instead a prostitute or simply his personal representation of beauty. With this chosen theme, the figure should be described simply as a nude woman (prostitute) or a "half Venus, nude". Both descriptions imply a sense of beauty; if she were an unknown nude prostitute, she was beautiful enough to catch Raphael's eye and inspire him to create an entire portrait of her. If she is a "half Venus, nude," she is a representation of the most beautiful goddess to ever exist; she is the embodiment of love, beauty, desire and ultimately, sex. During the Renaissance, beauty was equated to nakedness and the nude, for if a woman was naked she was captivating and sexually exciting to the artist and ultimately, the viewer. She is posed in a way that is reminiscent of the Venus pudica pose, enticing the viewer to look upon her naked body and imagine what she is hiding behind her thin drape. The Venus pudica pose is inspired by ancient sculptures of Venus in which the goddess is nude, but keeps her breasts and genitalia covered with either a hand or thin drape. Raphael makes the woman more risqué by enlarging her breasts, hardening her nipples, and giving her a possible flirty yet shy glance towards the viewer.

=== Raphael's lover ===
Another interpretation of the woman's identity assumes her to be Raphael's lover named Margherita; the figure's father was a baker and thus earned her the nickname of La Fornarina. Margherita supposedly refused to marry Raphael every time he asked. She was his muse and appeared as the subject in many of his paintings. She is shown wearing items associated with wealth and her assumed romantic relations to the painter. Her golden armband signed Raphael Vrbinas, and the appearance of a ring on her left, fourth finger can be seen as Raphael's indication of La Fornarina as his. However, she did end up leaving him. When she left him, it is said that Raphael fell into despair and could no longer paint, so Pope Leo and one of Raphael's most prominent patrons, Agostino Chigi, went looking for Fornarina in order to get rid of her. Pope Leo X believed that Raphael was just infatuated with the woman and not actually in love, so if they were rid of her, Raphael would return to his art once he heard she was gone. The Pope offered her money to disappear and she accepted; later, Raphael asked Chigi for help, promising to focus on his painting while he looked. Chigi returned without the woman and a fake letter saying that she would return to Raphael once the Chigi portrait was finished. Experts are divided on the veracity of this story.

=== Breast cancer ===
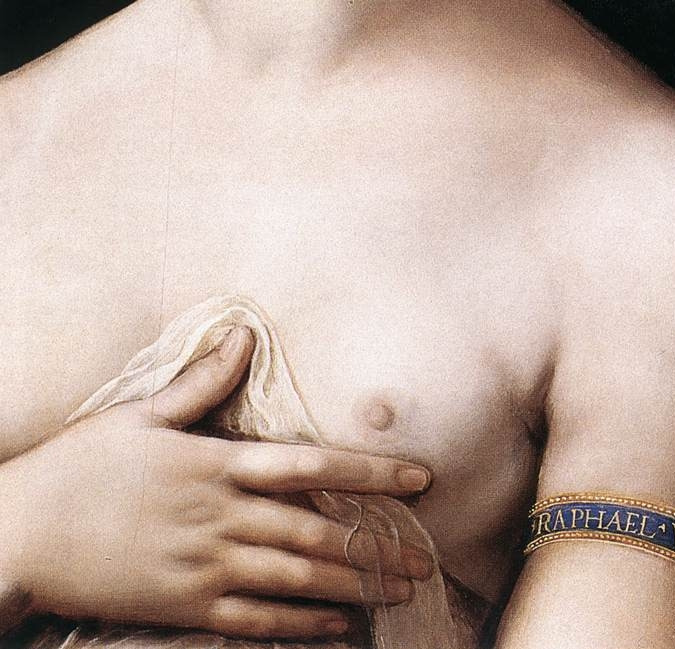
Detail of La Fornarina

Positioned a quarter of the way away from the viewer, it has been suggested by professor Carlos Hugo Espinel that the right hand over the left breast reveals a cancerous breast tumor. Even with the positioning, one can identify differences between her two breasts. The right breast is perceived as a fully formed and proportional breast, accompanied by healthy-looking skin and an unremarkable nipple upon a normal-looking areola. The viewer is given a better look at the left breast due to her positioning and thus can identify more problematic aspects that might not appear in the right breast. With the side view of the left breast, a viewer can see that it is enlarged and deformed by an indentation on the lower rim of the breast; the indentation begins where a possible mass ends. The mass extends from the woman's armpit medially along the lower half of her breast, and is seen to reach its apex at the spot just above her right index finger. Further evidence to a possible cancer is the sickly-blue hue to the skin of the left breast in relation to the healthy, pink undertones of the right one; the coloring is most prominent on the indentation and suspected tumor, but extends slightly above and below this area to the rest of the breast. Another possible indication of a cancerous tumor is that her left arm is swollen as a result of a lymph node in her armpit being enlarged. Enlarged lymph nodes and swelling are possible signs of a cancer diagnosis once metastasized.

=== La Fornarina as a witch ===
Muriel Segal's book Painted Ladies provides the theory that La Fornarina represents a witch. According to the author, during the time period that this painting was made, "the baker's daughter" did not indicate that a woman's father was in fact a baker, but a term used for a malevolent goddess. The goddess, referenced in Shakespeare's Ophelia character in the play Hamlet, is said to have been a cannibal owl-goddess. The owl-goddess is not specified in the play, but supposedly originates from hell; during this time, witches were seen as servants of Satan who practiced satanic magic. Segal states that La Fornarina was more fond of black cats than children, which at the time was not common because the main goal of most was to get married and procreate. Segal's interpretation differs from the belle donne theme in that she believes the figure herself is a witch and not a general depiction of witches. Jacob Burckhardt analyzes witch craft as neither good or evil, the women who practiced magic did so to support themselves by providing potions and spells for her patrons' desires. The physical features of Fornarina are completely unlike other painted women of the time; she was more healthy-looking with ample body parts (full lips, large breasts, wide hips, etc). Segal says the reason for this was because Raphael hated the wraith-like bodies that were the subjects of other artist's paintings.

=== Sex work ===
Another theory is that Fornarina was in fact a sex worker and not Raphael's lover; however, Raphael's "signature" on the figure's armband could imply that he did have love for the figure, and possibly felt ownership of the woman. In the painting, the figure is half nude and is wearing a suggestive smile, almost in a "come hither" look. The placement of her slightly open righthand on her left breast shows her nipple and a good amount of her breast; she seems to be teasing the viewer in order to entice them to come closer. The softer facial expression gives an air of familiarity between the subject and the viewer; she is not blank and staring into the eyes of the viewer like portraits of wealthy women, but rather is looking towards the viewer with a half smile like a passing acquaintance. The subject is wearing a yellow scarf across her head that during the Renaissance implied that the woman was a sex worker. Yellow scarves were a requirement for "dishonest women" to wear, these women were ones who willingly took off their clothing for artists which resulted in inspiration for much of the nude art pieces during the Renaissance. If a woman was wearing a yellow scarf across her head, she could show her naked body without prosecution. Courtesans were widely used in European culture beginning during the Renaissance; their existence and their depiction was a way for people to explore sexual relationships based on the ideals of classical writings on the subject.

== See also ==
- List of paintings by Raphael
- La velata, another Raphael painting of the same sitter
