= Margarita Luti =

Italian mistress and model of Raphael

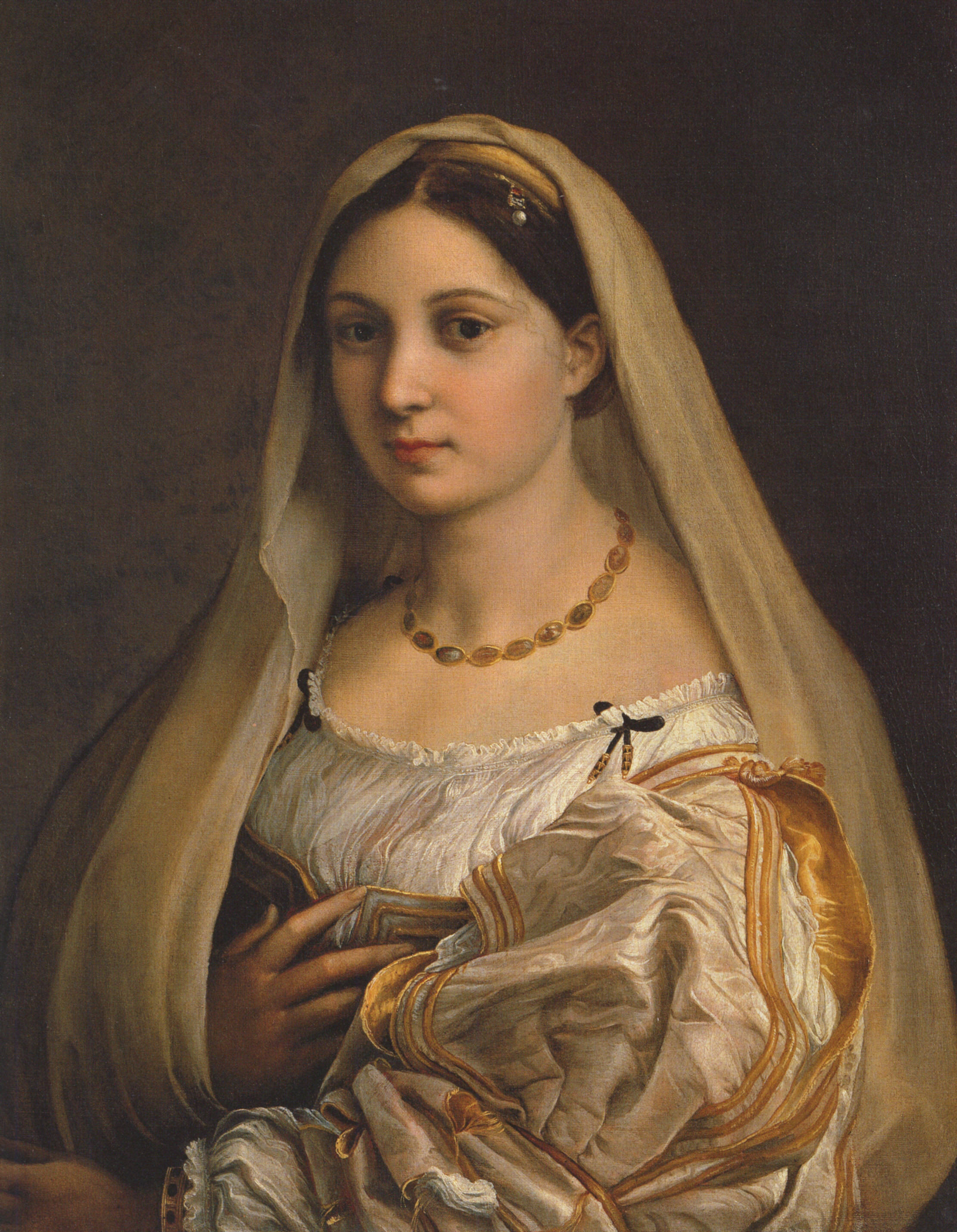
La donna velata (c. 1516); the pearl (Latin: margarita) adorning her hair may allude to the name of Raphael's mistress and model; her stray curl exemplifies the "studied carelessness" or sprezzatura celebrated in The Book of the Courtier by his friend Baldassare Castiglione; height 82 centimetres (32 in), width 60.5 centimetres (23.8 in); at the Palazzo Pitti in Florence

Margarita Luti (also Margherita Luti or La Fornarina, "the baker's daughter") was the mistress and model of Raphael. The story of their love has become "the archetypal artist–model relationship of Western tradition", yet little is known of her life. Of her, Flaubert wrote, in his Dictionary of Received Ideas, "Fornarina. She was a beautiful woman. That is all you need to know." (Note: "Fornarina. C'était une belle femme; inutile d'en savoir plus long")

== Life ==
According to Vasari, Raphael was a "very amorous man and affectionate towards the ladies". (Note: "Fu Rafaello persona molto amoroso, & affezzionata alle donne") He is said to have painted portraits of his mistress and to have assigned the engraver il Baviera to serve as her page. When commissioned by Agostino Chigi to decorate the Villa Farnesina, he was unable to dedicate himself properly to his work due to his infatuation - until she was allowed to come to live at his side. Again according to Vasari, it was Raphael's immoderate indulgence in "amorous pleasures", one day taken to excess, that brought on the fever which led to the young artist's death in 1520. Although in the Pantheon he lies beside his fiancée Maria, daughter of his patron Bernardo Dovizi, Raphael had long delayed his marriage; on his deathbed he sent his mistress away "with the means to live an honest life".

Margarita is not mentioned by Vasari but is named twice in sixteenth-century marginalia to the second edition of his Lives of the Most Excellent Painters, Sculptors, and Architects, beside the passage describing La donna velata: "portrait of Margarita, Raphael's mistress ... Margarita". (Note: "rittratto di Margarita donna di Rafaello ... Margarita") By the mid-eighteenth century she was referred to as La Fornarina. In a letter of 1806, Melchior Missirini recounted the tale of their first meeting, of how Raphael fell in love after watching her as she bathed her feet in the Tiber in the garden beside his house in Trastevere, only to discover that "her mind was as beautiful as her body". Although this story is retold in Passavant's 1839 Life of Raphael and elsewhere, Missirini was known for his "pseudo-traditions"; se non è vero, è ben trovato. In 1897 a document was discovered indicating that Margherita, widowed daughter of Francesco Luti of Siena, retired to the Convent of Santa Apollonia four months after Raphael's death. A small residence in Via di Santa Dorotea is now identified as her former home, one of three possible sites examined by Lanciani.

In a recent article Giuliano Pisani showed that the title "Fornarina" (first used by engraver Domenico Cunego in 1772) is rooted in a linguistic tradition, documented, among others, by the Greek poet Anacreon in the 6th century BCE and found in numerous literary texts from antiquity to the modern period. In this tradition, the Italian words "forno" ("oven") and its cognate "fornaia" ("woman baker") etc. metaphorically indicate the female sexual organ and the woman prostitute. We must understand "what" the Fornarina represents as opposed to "who she is", and Pisani advanced the hypothesis that Raphael, drawing his inspiration from Marsilio Ficino and Pietro Bembo, portrays in the "Fornarina" the celestial Venus, namely the type of love that raises the soul toward the search for truth by means of the "celestial" beauty. This Venus differs from the other Venus, the “terrestrial” Venus, namely the generating power of nature, who is connected with the terrestrial beauty and has procreation as her goal (the same interpretation for Titian, L'amor sacro e l'amor profane, Rome, Galleria Borghese). From this viewpoint, the "Fornarina" is interconnected with the "Velata", whom Pisani identifies as the terrestrial Venus, the bride, the mother.

== Art ==
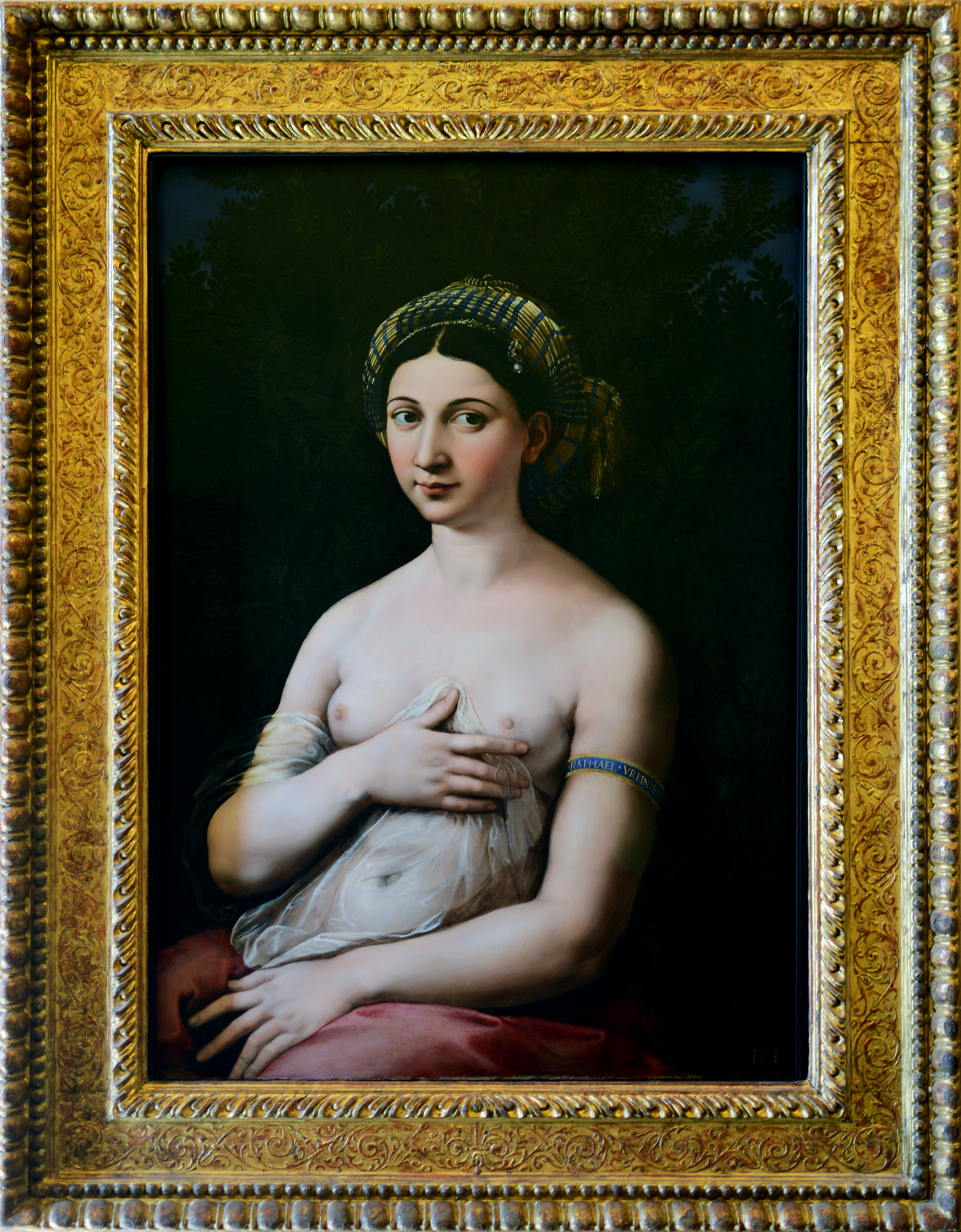
La Fornarina

Two portraits by Raphael are identified as those of Margarita, La Fornarina, where she is naked from the waist up, and, rather more demure, La donna velata. The former was already the subject of several early testimonies before featuring in a 1642 inventory of the Barberini collection. X-ray analysis during restoration work at the beginning of the twenty-first century, sponsored by Estée Lauder, revealed a ring with a ruby on the third finger of her left hand. She wears a ribbon with the artist's name; the ring may hint at betrothal and the depth of their bond. The latter work is identified by Vasari as a portrait of Raphael's mistress, "whom he loved until he died, and of whom he made a most beautiful portrait, which seems spirited and alive". (Note: "laquale Raffaello amó fino alla morte, & di quella fece un ritratto bellissimo, che pareva viva viva") She also served as his model for the Virgin and in other religious works: her features have been traced in the Madonna della seggiola, the Madonna di Foligno, the kneeling figure in the Transfiguration, the Stanze di Raffaello, the Ecstasy of St. Cecilia, and in Galatea. In the five or six sonnets attributed to the painter, the Petrarchan theme of ideal love is prominent; in one, perhaps apocryphal, there is an accompanying drawing sometimes identified as being of La Fornarina.

In addition, in his later years in Rome Raphael was one of the first Italian artists to consistently draw female figures from female models rather than the usual garzoni or young male assistants, and Luti probably modelled for many of the hundreds of his drawings that survive.

Vasari is said by Anthony Blunt to have invented the legend of Raphael. The "Raphael-Fornarina myth" has been reimagined ever since "to fit the expectations of contemporary generations". In Comolli's 1790 Life of Raphael, she is blamed for his death. In Balzac's Splendeurs et misères des courtisanes, she is the femme fatale or belle juive. In Joseph Méry's 1854 novel Raphaël et la Fornarine, Raphael instead complains to the pope of the lack of blonde female models in Rome. For Baudelaire, hers were "the affections of a courtesan". Byron, struck by La donna velata while in Florence, styled his Venetian mistress Margherita Cogni as La Fornarina. Caroline Norton wrote a sonnet in which Raphael tells Pope Leo X that she is his eyes. Nabokov suggests there was a feud between Raphael and Sebastiano del Piombo over rivalry for her affections, perhaps inspired by the former's La Fornarina and the latter's Portrait of a Woman, also known as La Fornarina.

In 1820, for the three hundredth anniversary of Raphael's death, Turner exhibited a painting (it:Roma vista dal Vaticano) of Raphael with La Fornarina. A pastel by Achille Devéria has Raphael paint her as she lies unrobed in their bed. A drawing by Fulchran-Jean Harriet shows the artist expiring in her arms. Ingres painted five versions of their amour, including those of 1814 and of 1840, and identified himself with the Renaissance artist. Callcott's Raffaelle and the Fornarina inspired a mezzotint of the same name by John Sartain. Among the drawings of Dante Gabriel Rossetti, founder of the Pre-Raphaelite Brotherhood, is Quartier Latin, the Modern Raphael and his Fornarina. Picasso included a series of sexually explicit images of Raphael and La Fornarina in his 347 Suite, as a tribute to Ingres. In Enrico Guazzoni's 1944 film La fornarina, Margherita is played by Lída Baarová, Goebbels' mistress. Margherita is also the focus of the first episode of Walerian Borowczyk's 1979 film Les héroïnes du mal, in which she is played by Marina Pierro as a femme fatale who fatally poisons Raphael. Carl Zeller's comic opera Die Fornarina premiered in 1879. In Arensky's 1894 opera Raphael, their passion is sublimated in a love duet. As Fornarina, Margarita also has a rose cultivar of 1862 named after her.
