= Concerto: One Night in Central Park =

Concerto, One Night in Central Park

Live album (with DVD) by Andrea Bocelli
- Released: November 15, 2011
- Recorded: September 15, 2011
- Venues: Central Park, New York City
- Genres: Pop; classical
- Labels: Decca, Sugar, Universal

Andrea Bocelli album chronology
Notte Illuminata (2011)	Concerto: One Night in Central Park (2011)	iTunes Festival: London 2012 (2012)

Andrea Bocelli DVD video chronology
My Christmas Special (2009)	Live in Central Park (2011)

Concerto: One Night in Central Park is a live album by Italian tenor Andrea Bocelli.

The album was recorded September 15, 2011, during a concert at Central Park's Great Lawn in New York City. Guest performers included Celine Dion, Tony Bennett, Chris Botti, Bryn Terfel, Pretty Yende, and music producer David Foster.

PBS announced that it would broadcast the concert nationwide, as Andrea Bocelli Live in Central Park.

Immediately upon release, the album entered the Billboard Top 10 and peaked at No. 4 on the Billboard 200.

== Background ==
It was announced that Bocelli would give a free concert, sponsored by Barilla, in September 2011, on the Great Lawn of Central Park in New York City. After the announcement, Bocelli declared, "I cannot help but smile when thinking about the upcoming concert in Central Park. It was my father's dream, and my father was right, because my artistic path would have been entirely different without the strong and sincere embrace of this extraordinary city where everything is possible, even when it seems impossible." Bocelli continued, "My father will not be there, but I can count on his blessing and his kind and gentle smile to give me courage. My mother, sitting in the front row, will feel my father too, and they will be together again just like when I was a little boy performing on the fireplace steps. Perhaps they had secretly dreamed that I might have the opportunity to perform in New York City, and maybe right here in Central Park."

New York City Mayor Michael Bloomberg said, "The Great Lawn in Central Park is one of the most remarkable and beautiful outdoor venues in the world and it is a great pleasure to welcome Andrea Bocelli back to New York to perform there. This free concert will be a memorable cultural moment for the thousands of New Yorkers and visitors that will watch the event live in the park, and many, many more through the broadcast by WNET."

New York City Parks Commissioner Adrian Benepe said, "I join the Mayor and all New Yorkers in thanking Andrea Bocelli and all involved in making a beautiful autumn evening full of splendor and world-class music possible, in one of the most cherished outdoor places in New York City. From the Great Lawn in the heart of Manhattan to the Great Performances series on WNET, where millions more will be able to share this gift, it will be a very special occasion. A million thank yous. Grazie mille!"

During the concert that took place September 15, a rainy day, Bocelli was accompanied by the New York Philharmonic, conducted by its music director Alan Gilbert, and the Westminster Symphonic Choir. He was joined on stage by singers Celine Dion, Tony Bennett, Bryn Terfel, Ana María Martínez and Pretty Yende, instrumentalists Chris Botti, Andrea Griminelli and Nicola Benedetti, and producer David Foster.

The concert took place September 15, and was attended by 70,000 people, including Mayor Bloomberg, Sting and Donald Trump.

== Release and promotion ==
Tickets for the concert at Central Park were made available August 4, 2011, following Bocelli's performance on Today, and the 60,000 tickets were sold out within the next few hours. The CD and DVD were released in over 70 countries, on November 15, 2011.

In November he performed "More" at the Alan Titchmarsh Show in the United Kingdom, and Dancing with the Stars in the United States, and "Amazing Grace" on The Tonight Show with Jay Leno.

Bocelli later made television appearances include BBC Breakfast and the televised concert, Children in need, at the MEN Arena, in Manchester, in the UK, and Good Morning America and The Talk, in the States, which aired in December.

Bocelli gave 5 concerts in the United States in December. In the meantime, the concert at Central Park, hosted by American journalist Paula Zahn, was airing throughout the United States and Canada, by PBS, on THIRTEEN's Great Performances series, and in Italy, by Rai 2 and Sky Uno.

In February 2012, Bocelli gave three Valentine concerts, including one at the Amway Center in Orlando, Florida, setting the all time ticket sales record by besting the previous record set by pop singer Lady Gaga.

In November and December 2012, he returned to the US to perform in six concerts.

=== Tour dates ===
Date	City	Country	Venue
First Leg: North American Christmas Concerts
December 1, 2011	Columbus	United States	Nationwide Arena
December 2, 2011	Washington, D.C.	United States	Verizon Center
December 4, 2011	Tampa	United States	St. Pete Times Forum
December 10, 2011	Las Vegas	United States	MGM Grand Garden Arena
December 11, 2011	Anaheim	United States	Honda Center
Second Leg: North American Valentine Concerts
February 10, 2012	Austin	United States	Frank Erwin Center
February 12, 2012	Orlando	United States	Amway Center
February 14, 2012	Sunrise	United States	BankAtlantic Center
Third Leg: UK and Ireland Fall Concerts
November 6, 2012	Dublin	Ireland	O_{2} Dublin
November 8, 2012	Belfast	Northern Ireland	Odyssey Arena
November 10, 2012	Birmingham	England	LG Arena
November 11, 2012	Liverpool	England	Echo Arena
November 14, 2012	London	England	The O_{2} Arena
November 15, 2012	London	England	The O_{2} Arena
Fourth Leg: North American Fall Concerts
November 23, 2012	San Jose	United States	HP Pavilion
November 24, 2012	Las Vegas	United States	MGM Grand Garden Arena
November 28, 2012	Houston	United States	Toyota Center
November 30, 2012	Dallas	United States	American Airlines Center
December 2, 2012	Rosemont	United States	Allstate Arena
December 5, 2012	Brooklyn	United States	Barclays Center

=== Box office score data ===
Venue	City	Tickets sold / available	Gross revenue
Verizon Center	Washington, D.C.	11,713 / 12,560 (93%)	$2,058,345
St. Pete Times Forum	Tampa	12,560 / 12,900 (97%)	$2,109,295
MGM Grand Garden Arena	Las Vegas	11,530 / 12,220 (94%)	$2,405,217
Honda Center	Anaheim	10,092 / 11,460 (88%)	$1,869,710
Frank Erwin Center	Austin	9,830 / 10,902 (90%)	$1,630,337
Amway Center	Orlando	10,526 / 11,601 (91%)	$1,620,171
BankAtlantic Center	Sunrise	13,312 / 13,312 (100%)	$2,209,915
The O_{2} Arena	London	22,298 / 24,234 (92%)	$3,293,450
HP Pavilion	San Jose	11,821 / 12,440 (95%)	$1,716,348
MGM Grand Garden Arena	Las Vegas	11,142 / 12,282 (91%)	$2,206,376
Toyota Center	Houston	12,162 / 12,764 (95%)	$2,084,373
American Airlines Center	Dallas	12,672 / 13,165 (96%)	$1,987,681
Allstate Arena	Rosemont	13,307 / 13,307 (100%)	$2,277,227
Barclays Center	Brooklyn	13,275 / 13,275 (100%)	$2,522,257
Total		176,240 / 186,281 (95%)	$29,990,702

== Commercial performance ==
Concerto: One Night in Central Park entered the Billboard 200 at No. 4 with 87,000 copies sold, becoming Bocelli's sixth top 10 effort, while My Christmas, his 2009 album, climbed from No. 62 to 36, with 17,000 copies sold, up 83% from the previous week. On its second week, the album fell to No. 14, with nearly 65,000 copies sold, down 25%, while My Christmas fell to No. 50, with 23,000. copies. On its third week, Concerto returned to the top 10, jumping to No. 8, with 61,000 copies, down 6%, while My Christmas rebounded to No. 17 with 35,000 copies sold, making Bocelli the only artist with two albums in the top 20 that week. The following week, Concerto jumped two spots to No. 6, with 79,000 copies sold, up 14%, while Bocelli continued to be the only artist with two albums in the top 20 for a second consecutive week, as My Christmas also rose to No. 16, with 49,000 copies sold. In its fifth week of release the album sold 76,000 more copies, down 3%, sliding just two positions to No. 8 on the chart, while my Christmas fell to No. 19, with 48,000 copies sold, giving Bocelli yet another week with 2 albums in the Top 20. On its sixth week of release, the live album dropped to No. 13, while the Christmas album dropped to No. 36, slipping to No. 2 on the Top Pop Catalog Albums chart after spending 3 straight week a top the chart. Selling a total of 460,000 copies in less than 2 month in the States, Concerto was the 8th best selling album during the 2011 holiday season.

The album entered at No. 17 on the UK Albums Chart, spending the last 6 weeks of 2011 in the top 30 of the chart. With 154,800 copies sold by year end, it finished at No. 77 on the Top 100 Best Selling Albums of 2011 list. The album also topped the Classical Compilation Albums Chart of the Official Charts Company.

== Track listing ==
Standard listing
No.	Title	Writer(s)	From	Length
1.	"La donna è mobile"	Giuseppe Verdi	Rigoletto	2:15
2.	"Di quella pira"	Verdi	Il trovatore	2:15
3.	"Ave Maria "Central Park Version""	Franz Schubert	Op. 52	4:44
4.	"Vicino a te s'acqueta" (feat. Ana María Martínez)	Umberto Giordano	Andrea Chénier	16:24
5.	"Au fond du temple saint" (feat. Bryn Terfel)	Georges Bizet	Les pêcheurs de perles	5:55
6.	"O soave fanciulla" (feat. Pretty Yende)	Giacomo Puccini	La bohème	4:04
7.	"Libiamo ne' lieti calici" (feat. Yende, Terfel, and Martínez)	Verdi	La traviata	3:08
8.	"Amazing Grace"	John Newton	Olney Hymns	4:20
9.	"New York, New York" (feat. Tony Bennett)	Fred Ebb, John Kander	New York, New York	3:26
10.	"The Prayer" (feat. Celine Dion)	David Foster, Carole Bayer Sager, Alberto Testa, Tony Renis	Quest for Camelot	4:29
11.	"More (Ti Guarderò nel Cuore)" (feat. Chris Botti and David Foster)	Riz Ortolani and Nino Oliviero	Mondo cane	3:47
12.	"Your Love (Once Upon a Time in the West)"	Ennio Morricone	Once Upon a Time in the West	3:46
13.	"Nel Blu, Dipinto di Blu (Volare)" (feat. David Foster)	Domenico Modugno, Franco Migliacci	1958 Eurovision Song Contest	3:22
14.	"Funiculì, Funiculà" (feat. flautist Andrea Griminelli)	Luigi Denza and Peppino Turco	Opening of the first funicular cable car on Mount Vesuvius	2:35
15.	"En Aranjuez con tu amor" (feat. Nicola Benedetti)	Joaquín Rodrigo	Concierto de Aranjuez	3:33
16.	"Time to Say Goodbye (Con te partirò)" (feat. Ana María Martínez)	Francesco Sartori and Lucio Quarantotto		4:13
17.	"Nessun dorma"	Giacomo Puccini	Turandot	4:07

Bonus track
No.	Title	Writer(s)	Length
18.	"'O sole mio"	Giovanni Capurro and Eduardo di Capua	3:23

== Charts and certifications ==
=== Peak positions ===
Chart (2011–2012)	Peak position
Australian Albums Chart	77
Australian Classical Albums Chart	4
Austrian Albums Chart	38
Belgian Albums Chart (Flanders)	49
Belgian Albums Chart (Wallonia)	43
Canadian Albums Chart	16
Dutch Albums Chart	30
French Albums Chart	132
Finnish Albums Chart	34
German Albums Chart	23
Hungarian Albums Chart	12
Irish Albums Chart	16
Italian Albums Chart	9
Mexican Albums Chart	95
New Zealand Albums Chart	22
Norwegian Albums	33
Portuguese Albums Chart	19
Polish Albums Chart	39
Spanish Albums Chart	73
Swedish Albums Chart	17
Swiss Albums Chart	61
Taiwanese Albums Chart	2
UK Albums Chart	17
US Billboard 200 Chart	4
US Classical Albums Chart	1

=== Year-end charts ===
Chart (2011)	Position
Hungarian Albums Chart	54
Italian FIMI Albums Chart	24
UK Albums Chart	77
Chart (2012)	Position
Canadian Albums Chart	47
Hungarian Albums Chart	38
US Top Billboard 200 Albums	42
US Top Classical Albums	1

=== Certifications ===
Region	Certification	Certified units/sales
Brazil (Pro-Música Brasil)	Platinum	30,000^{*}
Hungary (MAHASZ)	Platinum	4,000^{^}
Ireland (IRMA)	Gold	7,500^{^}
Italy (FIMI)	Platinum	60,000^{*}
Poland (ZPAV)	Gold	10,000^{‡}
United States (RIAA)	Gold	500,000^{^}
^{*} Sales figures based on certification alone.^{^} Shipments figures based on certification alone.^{‡} Sales+streaming figures based on certification alone.
