= Raphael (opera) =

Opera by Anton Arensky

Raphael (full title: Raphael: Musical Scenes from the Renaissance; Russian: Рафаэль: Музыкальные сцены из эпохи Возрождения; Italian: Raffaello), Op. 37, is an opera in one act by Anton Arensky. The libretto, by A. A. Kryukov, is based on the life of the Renaissance artist Raphael. The text was written in Russian and immediately translated into Italian by L. Egidi.

The opera was composed in 1894 for the First Congress of Russian Artists and dedicated to the Moscow Society of Lovers of the Arts. It premiered in Italian at the Moscow Conservatory on 6 May (old calendar: 26 April), with set-design by Leonid Pasternak; Yevgeniya Mravina took the role of Fornarina, Raphael's model and mistress.

Arensky chose a work on non-Russian subject matter and distanced himself from the nationalistic tendencies of his teacher Rimsky-Korsakov.

Raphael was less well-received than its predecessor, Arensky's first opera Dream on the Volga. The only fragment remaining popular till now is the Folk Singer's Song off-stage that is usual in the repertoire of Russian tenors. In 2018 its English translation (“My heart is trembling with passion and pleasure”) was published (see the link below).

== Structure ==
Introduction (Overture)
I. Chorus of Apprentices
II. Arioso of Raphael
III. Duet of Raphael and Fornarina (includes Chorus of Romans and Folk Singer's Song off-stage)
IV. Aria of the Cardinal
V. Trio
VI. Finale

== Recordings ==
There is a recording with the Philharmonia of Russia conducted by Constantine Orbelian on the Delos label, featuring Marina Domashenko in the title role (mezzo-soprano); Tatiana Pavlovskaya as Fornarina (soprano); Alexander Vinogradov as Cardinal Bibbiena (bass); and Vsevolod Grivnov as an off-stage folk singer (tenor).

== See also ==
- Pyotr Ilyich Tchaikovsky and The Five
- Lives of the Most Excellent Painters, Sculptors, and Architects
