= My Christmas (Andrea Bocelli album) =

Studio album by Andrea Bocelli
- Released: November 3, 2009
- Genre: Christmas
- Length: 59:17 (US)
- Labels: Universal, Philips, Decca, Verve, Sugar
- Producers: David Foster, Renato Serio

Andrea Bocelli chronology
Incanto (2008)	My Christmas (2009)	Carmen: Duets & Arias (2010)

Singles from My Christmas
- 1. "White Christmas" Released: 3 November 2009; 2. "What Child Is This" Released: 3 November 2009

My Christmas is the thirteenth studio album and first Christmas album released by Italian tenor Andrea Bocelli.

The album is a compilation of seasonal holiday favorites, mainly in English, with a few selections in Italian, German, and French, produced by multiple Grammy Award winner David Foster, containing duets with Mary J. Blige, Natalie Cole, Reba McEntire, Katherine Jenkins, the Mormon Tabernacle Choir, and the Muppets. It also includes "God Bless Us Everyone", the only original song of the album, which Bocelli recorded for the closing of the 2009 film, A Christmas Carol.

A Spanish version of the album, called Mi Navidad, was released November 23, 2009, and a PBS Christmas special of the album, filmed in the Kodak Theatre, was released on DVD December 8, 2010, after airing on PBS stations nationwide.

With over 2.2 million copies sold in the last two months of 2009 in the United States alone, the album was the best-selling holiday album of the year, and one of the best-selling albums of 2009, with worldwide sales exceeding 5 million copies.

As of November 2014, My Christmas has sold over 3,010,000 copies in the United States, making it one of the best-selling holiday albums in the United States, since Nielsen SoundScan tracking music sales tracking began in 1991.

== Release and promotion ==
=== 2009 ===
The Andrea Bocelli & David Foster Christmas Special, the PBS special of the album, first aired on Thanksgiving night in the United States, and continued to be broadcast in the United States and Canada throughout the month of December. In late November, the program was broadcast in Mexico and in the UK; it later aired, December 15 and 25, on Italia 1, in Italy, December 19, on TVE2 and TROS, in Spain and the Netherlands, and Christmas Eve, on vtm and RTL-TVI, in Belgium and Luxembourg.

On November 3, during the World Premiere of Disney's A Christmas Carol, in Leicester Square, London, following the switching on of the annual Oxford Street and Regent Street Christmas lights, Bocelli led the St Paul's Cathedral Choir, and more than 14,000 people across the capital, as they broke the Official Guinness World Record for the biggest ever Christmas carol sing-along, singing "Silent Night". He completed his performance in Leicester Square with, "God Bless Us Everyone", the closing song of the movie, which he provided the vocals for in English, Italian and Spanish. He returned to the United Kingdom, December 16, for an appearance on The One Show, broadcast live by BBC One, and on The Alan Titchmarsh Show which aired December 18, on ITV1.

On November 21, a segment of Leute Heute, a German tabloid-program on ZDF, was about My Christmas and Bocelli's meeting in Rome with Pope Benedict XVI and 250 other artists, an event which was broadcast live earlier that day in Italy, by Rai Uno. Bocelli was also joined by the Piccolo Coro dell'Antoniano, in his home in Forte dei Marmi, where they sang "Caro Gesù Bambino", a song from My Christmas which was originally recorded by the choir in 1960. Rai Uno also broadcast the performance later that day, during the Zecchino d'Oro Festival. The following day, Bocelli was among Fabio Fazio's guests, on his popular Italian talk-show, Che tempo che fa, broadcast on Rai Tre. During the program Bocelli talked about his album and performed "The Lord's Prayer", "White Christmas", and "Silent Night". It was also announced that Bocelli will return to the show, December 20, where he will give a live concert of My Christmas. Bocelli also took part in the annual 2009 José Carreras Gala, on December 17, where he sang Adeste Fideles, before singing "White Christmas" with José Carreras for the very first time, which was broadcast live, by Das Erste, in Germany. He then returning to Italy, for a concert in the Upper Basilica of San Francesco d'Assisi, on December 19, which was broadcast directly after the Urbi et Orbi blessing of Pope Benedict XVI, December 25, on Rai Uno.

In North America, Bocelli gave 6 concerts. On November 28, he performed in the BankAtlantic Center, in Sunrise, Florida. He later performed in the Air Canada Centre, in Toronto, Canada, in the Izod Center, in East Rutherford, New Jersey, in the William Saroyan Theatre, in Fresno, California, (changed from the much larger venue, the Save Mart Center, due to scheduling conflicts), in the MGM Grand, in Las Vegas, and finally in the Honda Center, in Anaheim, California, on December 3, 5, 8, 12, and 13. His last three arena concerts alone grossed a total of over 5.6 million dollars, placing him third on Billboard's week's Hot Tours ranking, behind the Trans-Siberian Orchestra and Il Divo, who both held over 5 times more concerts worldwide, compared to Bocelli's three in the United States, explaining their better showings.

In the United States, Bocelli made a number of high-profile TV appearances. He first performed "White Christmas" at the 83rd annual Macy's Thanksgiving Day Parade, broadcast live on NBC, November 26. He then performed the song again, November 30, during The Today Show also live. His appearance on The Oprah Winfrey Show during her Holiday Music Extravaganza, where he sang "What Child Is This", with Mary J. Blige, and later closed the show with Adeste Fideles, was also aired the same day, and was later rebroadcast on December 23. Bocelli also sang "Adeste Fideles" and was interviewed by Barbara Walters and Joy Behar on The View, which aired December 2, on ABC. On December 8, he performed "Jingle Bells" with the Muppets on NBC's The Jay Leno Show. He also performed a number of songs from the album, including "The Christmas Song" with Natalie Cole, during a dinner at David Foster's mansion in Malibu, which was feathered on The Dr. Phil Show, on December 10. Bocelli also performed "White Christmas" and "Silent Night", on Larry King Live's and Fox & Friends' holiday specials, broadcast December 23 on CNN, and December 19, 24 and 25 on Fox News. Bocelli's rendition of "Silent Night" was chosen as the Starbucks iTunes Pick of the Week, for December 1, 2009. Starbucks also offered My Christmas for sale, in their stores.

In Brazil, following the success of the South American leg of the Incanto tour, were over 100,000 people attended his free concert at the São Paulo's "Parque Indipendencia", earlier in the year, it was announced that Bocelli would hold another Open-Air, entrance free, concert in Florianópolis, on December 28, where a crowd of about a million people was expected to attend. However, for financial and political reasons, the concert was later canceled on short notice, along with all the other events scheduled for Christmas in the city.

=== 2010 ===
As part of the 2010 leg of the My Christmas Tour, Bocelli gave two concerts in the two largest indoor arenas of the United Kingdom, The O2 Arena, in London, and the M.E.N. Arena, in Manchester, and a concert in the largest indoor arena in Ireland, The O2, in Dublin, in late November 2010. His sold-out concert at the O2 in London, was the most attended show in the venue's history, with 16,500 people attending the event.

In early December, Bocelli gave 6 concerts in the United States. He will perform in Madison Square Garden, in New York City, Prudential Center, in Newark, New Jersey, TD Garden, in Boston, Toyota Center, in Houston, Staples Center, in Los Angeles, and the MGM Grand's Garden Arena, in the Las Vegas Strip. The Toyota Center concert, in Houston, was attended by former president George Bush Sr. and first lady Barbara Bush.

Bocelli also took part in the Christmas in Washington special on December 12, in the presence of president Barack Obama and the first lady. On December 19, Bocelli gave a concert, conducted by Claudio Scimone, in the Italian Senate. The concert was attended by Italy's top officials including Italy's president Giorgio Napolitano, Renato Schifani, the president of the Italian Senate, Gianfranco Fini, the president of the Italian Chamber of Deputies and Tarcisio Bertone, Cardinal Secretary of State of the Holy See.

=== 2011 ===
Bocelli gave 5 concerts in the United States in December 2011, in support of both My Christmas and his then new live album, Concerto: One Night in Central Park. Bocelli also performed White Christmas in an appearance at Good Morning America, airing December 22.

== Critical reception ==
The album received generally positive reviews.

Matt Collar of AllMusic gave the album a positive review and praised it as "not only a warm and inviting holiday album, but also a superb classical crossover entry worthy of Bocelli's discography."

== Commercial performance ==
In the United States, despite being released in early November, My Christmas was the fifth best-selling album of 2009, and second, only to Susan Boyle's debut album I Dreamed A Dream, in the lists of best-selling albums released in 2009, best-selling albums during the 2009 holiday season, and best-selling 2009 Internet Albums. It was also the best-selling holiday album of 2009, with just under 2.21 million units sold in only nine weeks, over four times as many as the year's second seasonal seller, Sting's If on a Winter's Night..., and nearly as many copies as the rest of the top ten seasonal best-sellers combined. It is only the second Christmas album, in Nielsen SoundScan history, to wind up in the year-end top five, the other being Josh Groban's Noël, the best-selling album of 2007. By November 2014, My Christmas had sold 3.01 million copies in the US, making it one of the best-selling holiday album in the United States since Nielsen SoundScan music sales tracking began in 1991.

My Christmas was also the sixth best-selling album of 2009, fifth best-selling album released in 2009, second best-selling album during the holiday season, and best-selling holiday album, in Canada, with 228,000 units sold in the country, 222,000 of which were physical sales, making it also the sixth best-physical seller of the year. Bocelli was also the sixth and tenth best-selling artist of the year, in the United States and Canada respectively, with 2,668,000 and 264,000 units of his albums sold in both countries, in 2009.

My Christmas sold over 5 million copies worldwide, in 2009 alone, despite being released internationally for a little over a month during the year, making it the 10th best selling album in 2009, worldwide.

=== United States ===
My Christmas was listed in the top three on the Billboard 200 chart in its first eight weeks on the chart, selling over 100,000 copies on each of those weeks, and spending five of them at the No. 2 position, making it the first album to spend five or more weeks peaking in the runner-up position, since Now 8, in 2001, and the 11th to do so in the last 25 years. It also held the No. 1 position on the US Classical albums chart, for nine consecutive weeks, and on the Holiday albums chart for eight consecutive weeks, slipping to No. 2 on its ninth week of release (the week after Christmas). On December 7, 2009, My Christmas was certified double platinum by the Recording Industry Association of America (RIAA) for shipments of more than two million copies in the US.

My Christmas first arrived at No. 3 on the Billboard 200 chart, and at No. 1 on both the US Classical albums and holiday albums charts, with 149,000 copies sold on its first week, marking Bocelli's fifth top 10 effort and a record-setting seventh No. 1 peaking, on the Billboard 200 chart and Classical albums chart, respectively. It also marked, at the time, Bocelli's best sales week since Cieli di Toscana blew through 177,000 over Christmas week of 2001, and his second-best debut sales week, trailing only Bocelli's 1999 album Sogno, which pulled in a slightly better first-week number. Moreover, at No. 3, it marked Bocelli's highest chart debut in America, since his 2006 album, Amore. However, the album climbed one notch to No. 2, with 136,000 units sold (down a scant 8%) in its second week, and remained at No. 2 the following four weeks, with 185,000 units sold (a gain of 36%) in its third week, 218,000 sold (a gain of 18%) in its fourth, and another 428,000 (up 97%) sold in its fifth week, 20,000 of which were digital copies, making it the top selling album on iTunes and the No. 1 US Digital Album, of the week. Its fifth week marked Bocelli's best sales week in America to date, in which My Christmas surpassed a million in total (1,12 million), and became his best-selling album in the States, since the release of Amore in 2006 (1,66 million), as well as his highest-charting album in the country. The album then continued to play runner-up to Susan Boyle's Dream, for a third week, with an additional 400,000 units sold (down 7%) in its sixth week.

After five weeks stuck at No. 2, My Christmas slipped one notch to No. 3 with 390,000 units sold (down 3%) in its seventh week, in which the album blew through 1,9 million copies and became Bocelli's third-best seller in America, behind Romanza (4.2 million) and Sogno (2.5 million), and his best-seller released in the first decade of the 21st century. Bocelli remained at No. 3 the following week, with an additional 284,000 units sold (down 27%) on the album's eighth week, before slipping thirty-one positions to No. 34, with only 17,000 units sold (down 94%) in its ninth and final sales week of 2009.

My Christmas re-entered the Billboard 200 chart in late November 2010, peaking at No. 11 in mid-December and selling over 70,000 units that week (fewer than 100 copies away from re-entering the top 10). The album's total 2010 sales were at 371,000 copies, making My Christmas the only catalog album among the five best-selling holiday albums of 2010, after topping the list the previous year, as well as Bocelli's second-best selling album ever in the U.S., surpassing his 1999 album Sogno, and trailing only his 1997 breakthrough album Romanza, with just under 2.6 million copies sold in the country in its two years of release. The album also spent four consecutive weeks at No. 1, on Billboard's Catalog Albums Chart, in December 2010. The only previous time Bocelli had topped the Catalog Chart was in 2000, over a decade earlier, with his album Romanza. My Christmas was the second best selling Catalog album of the year, surpassed only by Adele's 2008 album, 19.

The album yet again reentered the chart in mid November 2011. For the week ending December 4, the album jumped 33 positions to No. 17, in its 24th week on the chart, with 35,000 copies sold, topping the Catalog Albums Chart for the second straight year, and for a fifth week since its release. Bocelli was the only artist with two albums in the top 20 during that week, as his 2011 live album, Concerto, One Night in Central Park returned to the Top 10, reaching No. 8. The following week, the album jumped one spot to No. 16, the highest position achieved by a catalog album that season, with 49,000 copies sold, spending a sixth non-consecutive week a top the Catalog Chart, and giving Bocelli a second week with 2 albums in the Top 20, as Concerto also rose to No. 6, with 79,000 copies sold. Bocelli had yet another week with 2 albums in the Top 20 of the Billboard 200 chart, as My Christmas slipped only 3 positions to No. 19 with 48,000 copies sold, remaining on top of the Catalog Chart, while Concerto sold 76,000 more copies, sliding just two positions to No. 8 on the chart. The following week, the Christmas album dropped to No. 36, slipping to No. 2 on the Catalog chart after spending 3 straight week a top the chart, while the live album dropped to No. 13. My Christmas sold a total of 247,000 copies in 2011, placing it in the top 10 of the Top selling seasonal albums of the year, at No. 6, for the third consecutive year, and making it the best selling Catalog Holiday album for the second year. The album was also 9th on the Billboard Year-End top-selling Catalog album chart, slipping from being second the previous year. In the meantime Bocelli's other album Concerto sold 460,000 copies in its 6 weeks of release during the year, making it the 8th top selling albums during the 2011 Holiday Season.

In November 2012, My Christmas reentered the Billboard 200 chart, reaching No. 2 on the Catalog Albums Chart, second only to Michael Bublé's 2011 Christmas album, on its second week of the season. For the week ending December 2, the album jumped 43 positions to No. 36, with nearly 20,000 copies sold on its 31st week on the chart, also reaching No. 3 on the Catalog albums chart, and reentering the Top 10 of the Holiday albums chart. The following week, the album climbed another spot on both the Billboard 200 and Holiday albums charts, reaching No. 35, and No. 9, respectively, its peak positions of the season on both charts. It also spent another week at No. 3 on the Catalog albums Chart. My Christmas sold a total of 123,000 copies in 2012, placing it in the top 10 of the Top selling seasonal albums of the year, at No. 10, for the fourth consecutive year, dropping to fourth among Catalog Holiday albums after being first the two previous years.

=== Canada ===
My Christmas was listed in the top three of the Canadian Albums Chart for six consecutive weeks, and was No. 2 in four of those weeks. It debuted at No. 15 on the chart, and climbed to No. 8 in its second week on the chart. On its third week however, with an additional 16,000 units sold, it shot up six positions to No. 2, marking Bocelli's highest peak positioning in Canada since Sogno topped the Canadian Albums chart, on its debut week a decade earlier, in 1999. On its fourth week, the album slipped one notch to No. 3, and stayed there, with another 42,000 units sold, on its fifth week. The following week, the album was back on the No. 2 spot on the chart, and stayed there the following 2 weeks, with an additional 53,000 units sold on its seventh week of release, and around 30,000 on its eighth. In its ninth week, the last sales week of 2009, the album slipped twenty positions to No. 22 on the chart, but remained No. 1 on the Canadian classical albums chart, a position it held in all its nine weeks, in 2009.

=== Italy ===
My Christmas spent a total of 3 consecutive weeks at No. 1 on the Italian FIMI Albums Chart, debuting at No. 7, with just under 10,000 copies sold in its first week of release, and climbing, the following week, to No. 3 with around 16,000 sold in its second. In its third week, the album climbed another notch to No. 2, with an additional 28,000 copies, before reaching the No. 1 spot, with 72,000 units sold in its fourth week, where it remained the following 2 week, with 92,000 units sold in its fifth week, and 23,000 units sold in its sixth week of release.

=== Hungary and Poland ===
My Christmas also topped the Hungarian Albums Chart, achieving triple platinum status, and becoming the second best selling album of 2009 in the country.

The album also topped the Polish Albums Chart, for 3 consecutive weeks in 2009. In December 2011, exactly two years later, My Christmas reentered the Polish album chart at No. 2, and went on to top it the following week, giving it a total of four non-consecutive weeks at No. 1 on the chart.

=== United Kingdom ===
In the United Kingdom, My Christmas debuted at No. 18, with over 41,000 units sold on its first week of release, then slipped to No. 24, on its second, and stayed there on its third, before slipping one notch to No. 25 on its fourth week, with a three-week total exceeding 100,000 copies.

=== Mi Navidad chart performance ===
Mi Navidad, the Spanish version of the album, arrived at No. 180 on the Billboard 200 chart, selling just under 7,000 copies on its first week, and peaked at No.1 on both the US Latin Albums and the US Latin Pop Albums charts, and at No. 3, on the US Classical Albums chart, at which time Bocelli held the No. 1 and No. 3 spots simultaneously on the chart, with the two versions of the album, for 4 consecutive weeks. Mi Navidad shipped 50,000 units in 2009 in the United States, and was certified gold by the RIAA.

== Singles ==
=== "White Christmas" ===
"White Christmas" was recorded by Bocelli for the album. The song debuted at No. 7 on the Hungarian Singles Chart.

=== "What Child is This" ===
Bocelli covered "What Child Is This?" for the album, singing the carol with American R&B singer Mary J. Blige. The single was released in North America on November 3, 2009, the same release date as the album.

Bocelli performed the song with Blige for his PBS My Christmas Special, which aired on PBS stations throughout the month of December. He later performed the song with Blige on the Holiday Music Extravaganza edition of The Oprah Winfrey Show, which aired November 30, 2009.

"What Child is This" entered the US Hot Digital Songs chart on December 9, 2009, at number 63.

Chart (2009)	Peak position
Canadian Hot 100	66
US Hot Digital Songs	63

== Track listing ==
North American standard listing
No.	Title	Writer(s)	Producer(s)	Length
1.	"White Christmas/Bianco Natale"	Irving Berlin, Devilli	David Foster	3:59
2.	"Angels We Have Heard On High"	Traditional	Foster	3:53
3.	"Santa Claus Is Coming to Town"	J. Fred Coots, Haven Gillespie	Foster	3:32
4.	"The Christmas Song" (with Natalie Cole)	Mel Tormé, Robert Wells	Foster	4:33
5.	"The Lord's Prayer" (with Mormon Tabernacle Choir)	Traditional	Foster	4:25
6.	"What Child Is This?" (with Mary J. Blige)	William Chatterton Dix	Foster	4:31
7.	"Adeste Fideles"	John Francis Wade, Jean François Borderies	Renato Serio	3:33
8.	"O Tannenbaum"	Ernst Anschütz, Joachim August Zarnack	Foster	4:18
9.	"Jingle Bells" (with the Muppets)	James Pierpont	Foster	3:35
10.	"Silent Night"	Joseph Mohr, Franz Xaver Gruber, John Freeman Young	Foster	4:36
11.	"Blue Christmas" (with Reba McEntire)	Billy Hayes, Jay W. Johnson	Foster	4:18
12.	"Cantique De Noel"	Adolphe Adam, Placide Cappeau	Foster	4:34
13.	"Caro Gesù Bambino"	Piero Soffici, Pier Quinto Cariaggi	Foster	1:43
14.	"I Believe" (with Katherine Jenkins)	Eric Lévi	Foster	4:24
15.	"God Bless Us Everyone" (from the A Christmas Carol soundtrack)	Glen Ballard, Alan Silvestri	Glen Ballard, Alan Silvestri	3:15

International standard listing
No.	Title	Writer(s)	Producer(s)	Length
1.	"White Christmas/Bianco Natale"	Berlin	Foster	3:58
2.	"Angels We Have Heard On High"		Foster	3:53
3.	"Santa Claus Is Coming To Town"	Coots, Gillespie	Foster	3:32
4.	"The Christmas Song" (with Cole)	Tormé, Wells	Foster	4:32
5.	"The Lord's Prayer" (with the Mormon Tabernacle Choir)		Foster	4:24
6.	"What Child Is This" (with Blige)	Chatterton Dix	Foster	4:30
7.	"Adeste Fideles"	Wade, Borderies	Serio	3:33
8.	"O Tannenbaum"	Anschütz, Zarnack	Foster	4:17
9.	"Jingle Bells" (with the Muppets)	Pierpont	Foster	3:34
10.	"Silent Night"	Mohr, Gruber, Young	Foster	4:36
11.	"Blue Christmas" (with Malika Ayane)	Hayes, Johnson	Foster	4:17
12.	"Cantique De Noel"	Adam, Cappeau	Foster	4:34
13.	"Caro Gesù Bambino"	Soffici, Cariaggi	Foster	1:43
14.	"Tu Scendi Dalle Stelle"	Alphonsus Liguori	Serio	2:49
15.	"God Bless Us Everyone"	Ballard, Silvestri	Ballard, Silvestri	3:15
16.	"I Believe" (with Jenkins)	Lévi	Foster	4:24

Mi Navidad (Spanish version) standard listing
No.	Title	Writer(s)	Producer(s)	Length
1.	"Blanca Navidad (White Christmas)"	Berlin	Foster	3:59
2.	"Gloria In Excelsis Deo (Angels We Have Heard On High)"	Chadwick	Foster	3:53
3.	"Santa Claus Llego' A La Ciudad (Santa Claus Is Coming To Town)"	Coots, Gillespie	Foster	3:32
4.	"The Christmas Song" (with Cole)	Tormé, Wells	Foster	4:33
5.	"The Lord's Prayer" (with the Mormon Tabernacle Choir)		Foster	4:25
6.	"What Child Is This" (with Blige)	Chatterton Dix	Foster	4:31
7.	"Venid Adoremos (Adeste Fideles)"	Wade, Borderies	Serio	3:33
8.	"El Abeto (O Tannenbaum)"	Anschütz, Zarnack	Foster	4:18
9.	"Jingle Bells" (with the Muppets)	Pierpont	Foster	3:35
10.	"Noche De Paz (Silent Night)"	Mohr, Gruber, Young	Foster	4:36
11.	"Blue Christmas" (with Malika Ayane)	Hayes, Johnson	Foster	4:18
12.	"Santa La Noche (Cantique De Noel)"	Adam, Cappeau	Foster	4:34
13.	"Caro Gesu Bambino"	Soffici, Cariaggi	Foster	1:43
14.	"Bajas De Las Estrellas (Tu Scendi Dalle Stelle)"	Alphonsus Liguori	Serio	2:49
15.	"Dios Nos Bendecira (God Bless Us Everyone)"	Silvestri	Silvestri	3:16

== Personnel ==
Unless otherwise indicated, credits are adapted from liner notes

- Andrea Bocelli - vocals (tracks 1, 4, 11–14, lead on 2–3, 5–10, 15), melodica (3), flute solo (8, 14)
- Janet Adderly - kids choir conductor (track 3)
- The Adderly School Kids Choir - background vocals (track 3)
- Animal - Muppets group member voiced by Eric Jacobson (track 9)
- Haydn Bendall - orchestral recording engineer (tracks 1–6, 8–14)
- Tom Bender - assistant audio mixing (track 15)
- Mary J. Blige - lead vocals (track 6)
- Courtney Blooding - production coordinator (All tracks), background vocals (tracks 6, 8, 10)
- Edie Lehmann Boddicker - choir contractor (track 2)
- Daniele Bonaviri - guitar solo (track 6)
- Brian Bromberg - bass played by (track 4)
- Valerio Calisse - choir conductor (track 7), additional recording engineer (1–6, 8–14)
- Scott Campbell - recording engineer (track 15)
- Peter Cobbin - choir recording engineer (track 15)
- Vinnie Colaiuta - drums (tracks 4, 11)
- Natalie Cole - vocals (track 4)
- Devilli - Italian Lyrics written by (track 1)
- Terry Edwards - London choir master (track 15)
- David Foster - musical arrangement, orchestral arrangement (tracks 2, 5–6, 8–10), keyboards (1, 4, 6, 8, 10–11, 14), piano (5, 12–13), organ played by (2, 5)
- Erin Foster - musical arrangement (tracks 8, 10)
- Jordan D. Foster - musical arrangement (tracks 8–9)
- Sara Michael Foster - musical arrangement (tracks 2, 8)
- Fozzie Bear - Muppets group member voiced by Eric Jacobson (track 9)
- Gonzo - Muppets group member voiced by Dave Goelz (track 9)
- Mark Graham - LA choir master (track 15)
- Isobel Griffiths - orchestra contractor (All tracks)
- Pierpaolo Guerrini - additional recording engineer (tracks 1–6, 8–14)
- Mick Guzauski - audio mixing (track 15)
- Roy Hendricks - Mary J. Blige's vocal recording engineer (track 6)
- Katherine Jenkins - vocals (track 14)
- Lewis Jones - assistant recording engineer (tracks 1–6, 8–14)
- Kermit the Frog - Muppets group member voiced by Steve Whitmire (track 9)
- Reba McEntire - vocals (track 11)
- Chris Owens - assistant recording engineer (tracks 1–6, 8–14)
- Miss Piggy - Muppets group member voiced by Eric Jacobson (track 9)
- Mormon Tabernacle Choir - choir vocal performers (track 5)
- The Muppets - vocals (track 9)
- Maurice Murphy - trumpet solo (track 8)
- Richard Page - background vocals (track 6)
- Fabrizio Palma - background vocals (track 7)
- Dean Parks - guitar (tracks 4, 8, 11), rhythm guitar (6)
- Pepe the King Prawn - Muppets group member voiced by Bill Barretta(track 9)
- Paul Pritchard - assistant recording engineer (tracks 1–6, 8–14)
- Roman Academy Choir - background vocals (track 7)
- William Ross - orchestral arrangements (All tracks), musical arrangement (track 12)
- Jochem Van Der Saag - music programming, sound designer (All tracks), musical arrangement (track 12), recording engineer (1–6, 8–14), audio mixing (1–14)
- Salvation Army Boys Choir - background vocals (tracks 8, 10)
- Dennis S. Sands - orchestral recording engineer (track 15)
- Renato Serio - musical arrangement (track 7)
- Luciano Torani - recording engineer (track 7)
- Jorge Vivo - recording engineer (tracks 1–6, 8–14)
- Lucy Whalley - orchestra contractor (All tracks)
- Mack Wilberg - choir conductor, choir vocal arrangements (track 5)

== Charts and certifications ==
=== Weekly charts ===
Selected charts with peak positions for My Christmas
Chart (2009/2010)	Peak position
Argentinian Albums	8
Australian Albums	27
Austrian Albums	11
Belgian Albums (Flanders)	64
Belgian Albums (Wallonia)	11
Canadian Albums	2
Canadian Classical Albums	1
Czech Albums	3
European Top 100 Albums	6
Finnish Albums	2
French Albums	163
German Albums	42
Greek Albums	4
Hungarian Albums	1
Irish Albums	7
Italian Albums	1
Japanese Albums	142
Mexican Albums	29
Netherlands Albums	6
New Zealand Albums	29
Norwegian Albums	4
Polish Albums	1
Portuguese Albums	5
Spanish Albums	70
Swedish Albums	9
Swiss Albums	6
UK Albums	18
US Billboard 200	2
US Catalog Albums	1
US Classical Albums	1
US Holiday Albums	1
US Top Digital Albums	1

Selected charts with peak positions for Mi Navidad
Chart (2009)	Peak position
US Billboard 200	180
US Classical Albums	3
US Holiday Albums	18
US Latin Albums	1
US Latin Pop Albums	1

=== Year-end charts ===
Selected charts with positions for My Christmas
Chart (2009)	Position
Hungarian Mahasz Albums Chart	2
Italian FIMI Albums Chart	4
Chart (2010)	Position
Canadian Albums Chart	5
European Top 100 Albums	75
Hungarian Mahasz Albums Chart	18
US Top Billboard 200 Albums	6
US Top Classical Albums	1
Chart (2011)	Position
US Top Billboard 200 Albums	83
US Top Pop Catalog Albums	2
Chart (2012)	Position
US Top Billboard 200 Albums	125
US Top Pop Catalog Albums	9

Selected charts with positions for Mi Navidad
Chart (2010)	Position
US Top Billboard Latin Albums	27
US Top Classical Albums	8
US Top Latin Pop Albums	9

== Sales and certifications ==
My Christmas

Region	Certification	Certified units/sales
Canada (Music Canada)	5× Platinum	400,000^{^}
Denmark (IFPI Danmark)	Gold	10,000^{‡}
Finland (Musiikkituottajat)	Gold	14,796
Greece (IFPI Greece)	Gold	3,000^{^}
Hungary (MAHASZ)	3× Platinum	18,000^{^}
Ireland (IRMA)	2× Platinum	30,000^{^}
Italy (FIMI)	4× Platinum	280,000^{*}
Netherlands (NVPI)	Gold	25,000^{^}
Norway (IFPI Norway)	Platinum	30,000^{‡}
Poland (ZPAV)	Gold	10,000^{‡}
Switzerland (IFPI Switzerland)	Gold	15,000^{^}
United Kingdom (BPI)	Gold	100,000^{*}
United States (RIAA)	2× Platinum	3,010,000
United States (RIAA) for Mi Navidad	Gold (Latin)	50,000^{^}
^{*} Sales figures based on certification alone.^{^} Shipments figures based on certification alone.^{‡} Sales+streaming figures based on certification alone.

== PBS special ==
My Christmas was also a major component of a PBS Great Performances special, filmed September 15, 2009, at the Kodak Theatre in Los Angeles, airing in the New York City/tri-state viewing area on THIRTEEN's Great Performances series on Thanksgiving night, November 26, with additional broadcasts, which continued throughout December, on PBS stations nationwide, featuring Bocelli and Foster with additional guests including Natalie Cole, Mary J. Blige, Reba McEntire, Katherine Jenkins and the Muppets. The DVD of the full program was internationally released December 8, 2009.

== Deluxe CD/DVD edition ==
A Deluxe edition that features the standard CD and a bonus DVD containing highlights from the PBS My Christmas Special was released on November 23, 2009. Another Deluxe edition, containing the same DVD and, Mi Navidad, the Spanish version of the album, was released December 1, 2009.

== Release history ==
The US version of the album was released November 3, 2009, by Philips Records in North America, whereas the international version, containing an extra track, was released November 20, by Sugar in Italy, and by Universal in the rest of the world, except for the UK and Ireland, where it was released November 30, by Decca.

Country	Date	Format	Label
United States	November 3, 2009	CD, digital download	Philips
Canada	November 3, 2009	CD, digital download	Philips
Argentina	November 20, 2009	CD, digital download	Universal
Australia	November 20, 2009	CD, digital download	Universal
Austria	November 20, 2009	CD, digital download	Universal
Belgium	November 20, 2009	CD, digital download	Universal
Brazil	November 20, 2009	CD, digital download	Universal
Czech Republic	November 20, 2009	CD, digital download	Universal
Finland	November 20, 2009	CD, digital download	Universal
Greece	November 20, 2009	CD, digital download	Universal
Germany	November 20, 2009	CD, digital download	Universal
Hungary	November 20, 2009	CD, digital download	Universal
Hong Kong	November 20, 2009	CD, digital download	Universal
Japan	November 20, 2009	CD, digital download	Universal
Mexico	November 20, 2009	CD, digital download	Universal
New Zealand	November 20, 2009	CD, digital download	Universal
Norway	November 20, 2009	CD, digital download	Universal
Poland	November 20, 2009	CD, digital download	Universal
Portugal	November 20, 2009	CD, digital download	Universal
Spain	November 20, 2009	CD, digital download	Universal
Sweden	November 20, 2009	CD, digital download	Universal
Switzerland	November 20, 2009	CD, digital download	Universal
Italy	November 20, 2009	CD, digital download	Sugar
United Kingdom	November 30, 2009	CD, CD+DVD, CD, digital download	Decca
Ireland	November 30, 2009	CD, CD+DVD, CD, digital download	Decca

The CD/DVD package was released Internationally November 23, 2009, except for the UK and Ireland, where it was released November 30, the same day as the album.

Country	Date	Format	Label
United States	November 23, 2009	CD+DVD	Philips
Canada	November 23, 2009	CD+DVD	Philips
Argentina	November 23, 2009	CD+DVD	Universal
Australia	November 23, 2009	CD+DVD	Universal
Austria	November 23, 2009	CD+DVD	Universal
Belgium	November 23, 2009	CD+DVD	Universal
Brazil	November 23, 2009	CD+DVD	Universal
Czech Republic	November 23, 2009	CD+DVD	Universal
Finland	November 23, 2009	CD+DVD	Universal
Greece	November 23, 2009	CD+DVD	Universal
Germany	November 23, 2009	CD+DVD	Universal
Hungary	November 23, 2009	CD+DVD	Universal
Hong Kong	November 23, 2009	CD+DVD	Universal
Japan	November 23, 2009	CD+DVD	Universal
Mexico	November 23, 2009	CD+DVD	Universal
New Zealand	November 23, 2009	CD+DVD	Universal
Norway	November 23, 2009	CD+DVD	Universal
Poland	November 23, 2009	CD+DVD	Universal
Portugal	November 23, 2009	CD+DVD	Universal
Spain	November 23, 2009	CD+DVD	Universal
Sweden	November 23, 2009	CD+DVD	Universal
Switzerland	November 23, 2009	CD+DVD	Universal
Italy	November 23, 2009	CD+DVD	Sugar

Mi Navidad, the Spanish version of the album, was released Internationally, by Universal Latino, also on November 23, 2009. Its CD/DVD package was released by the same label, on December 1.

== See also ==
- Best-selling albums in the United States since Nielsen SoundScan tracking began
- Best-selling Christmas/holiday albums in the United States
- List of Billboard Top Holiday Albums number ones of the 2000s
- List of Billboard Top Holiday Albums number ones of the 2010s
- List of number-one Billboard Top Latin Albums of 2009
- List of number-one Billboard Latin Pop Albums of 2009
- List of number-one Billboard Latin Pop Albums of 2010
- My Christmas Special, the PBS concert of the album.
