= Zärtliche Liebe =

1795 love song by Ludwig van Beethoven

- Lied by Ludwig van Beethoven
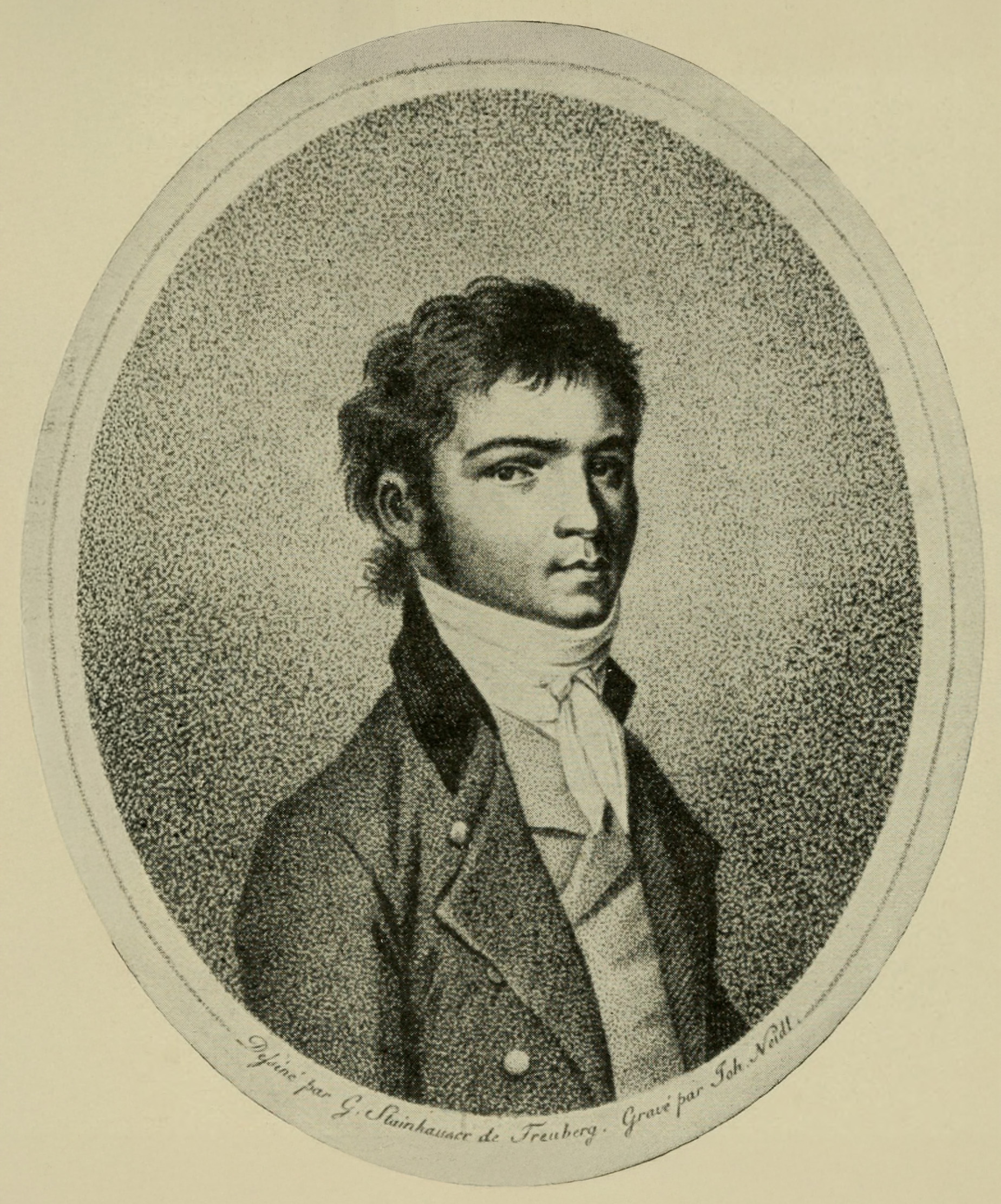
- Beethoven c. 1801, engraving after Carl Traugott Riedel
- English: Tender Love
- Key: G Major
- Catalogue: WoO 123
- Language: German
- Composed: 1795
- Published: 1803

"Zärtliche Liebe" ("Tender Love"), WoO 123, or "Ich liebe dich" ("I love you"), is a lied (art song) by Ludwig van Beethoven, composed in 1795 and first published in 1803. Beethoven was 25 years old when he wrote it. The song is occasionally referred to by its first line, "Ich liebe dich, so wie du mich".

== History ==
Though Alexander Thayer put the date of composition to be 1797–98 in Thayer's Life of Beethoven, recent research has found that "Zärtliche Liebe" was probably composed in 1795.

Commentator John Palmer offers historical background on the work:

The year 1795 was an important turning point in Beethoven's career. He had lived in Vienna for over two years, studied with Haydn and others, and, most importantly, had insinuated himself into the homes and hearts of the nobility. He had become something of a "hot commodity" among Viennese aristocrats, and his music was becoming popular, as evinced in the publication of his Trios, op. 1 in 1795.

"Zärtliche Liebe" was first published in 1803 by Johann Traeg in Vienna, one year before Beethoven's 3rd symphony. It was published along with "La partenza", WoO 124.

The autograph of the song has a unique history. It passed into the hands of Franz Schubert, who used the blank pages in June 1817 to sketch out the second movement of his Piano Sonata in E-flat major, D 568 and to write down some exercises in reading musical notation for an unknown pupil (whose written answers are also preserved on the manuscript). From there the autograph was divided up. Half came into the possession of Schubert's friend Anselm Hüttenbrenner (who inscribed an owner's note on it), and thence to the Viennese collector Johann Nepomuk Kafka, and thence to Johannes Brahms in 1870; in April 1872 Brahms acquired the other half from Schubert's nephew Eduard Schneider. Brahms added his own owner's note to the autograph. In 1893 he presented it to the Gesellschaft der Musikfreunde, where the musicologist Eusebius Mandyczewski added his own owner's note as well. The autograph is thus known as "the autograph of three masters": it preserves the handwriting of Beethoven, Schubert, and Brahms, as well as that of Hüttenbrenner, Mandyczewski, and an unknown child.

== Text ==
The lyrics are from a poem by Karl Friedrich Wilhelm Herrosee (1754–1821), a German pastor and writer. In the poem, the narrator expresses love for another, saying how their love lets them share sorrow and comfort.

German

Ich liebe dich, so wie du mich,
Am Abend und am Morgen,
Noch war kein Tag, wo du und ich
Nicht teilten unsre Sorgen.

Auch waren sie für dich und mich
Geteilt leicht zu ertragen;
Du tröstetest im Kummer mich,
Ich weint' in deine Klagen.

Drum Gottes Segen über dir,
Du, meines Lebens Freude.
Gott schütze dich, erhalt' dich mir,
Schütz und erhalt' uns beide.

Translation:
English

I love you as you love me,
At evening and at morning,
No day there was when you and I
Did not share our sorrows.

And for me and you they were,
When shared, an easy burden;
You comforted me in my distress,
I wept when you lamented.

May God then bless you,
You, my life's delight.
God protect and keep you for me,
Protect and keep us both.

== Music ==
The song, in G major, is set for a solo singer and piano. The range reaches the F natural at the top of the treble staff, and so the song is most likely to be sung by a tenor or soprano voice. As is the norm with lieder, the song may also be sung by lower voices in transposition; for instance the baritone Dietrich Fischer-Dieskau sang the work transposed down one full tone to F major.

The musical setting follows the structure of Herrosee's poem: the opening phrase is in the tonic key and covers the first stanza; the second stanza modulates to the dominant key (D major); and the third stanza returns to the tonic. Just before the tonic return there is a dominant chord with fermata in the piano part, inviting the singer to provide an improvised cadenza.

The tempo marking is andante. This is interpreted by different singers rather differently, with fervent performances approaching adagio on one hand and lighthearted performances approaching allegretto on the other. Hence the time taken to sing the work varies greatly, from under two minutes to well over three.

== Reception ==
The song would be considered a minor work for Beethoven, who is not primarily famous as a composer of lieder. Among the songs it is fairly prominent and is often included in recorded compilations. According to Turner (2010), compared to other songs in the lieder literature it is not often selected for song recitals by undergraduate students.
