= My Christmas Special =

- DVD cover
- Directed by: David Horn
- Starring: Andrea Bocelli
- Country of origin: United States
- Original language: English

Production
- Producer: David Foster
- Running time: 90 minutes

Original release
- Release: December 8, 2009

Related
- Incanto: The Documentary; Concerto, One Night in Central Park

The Andrea Bocelli & David Foster Christmas Special, is the PBS Great Performances Christmas special of Andrea Bocelli's first ever Holiday album, My Christmas, produced by multiple Grammy Award winner David Foster. Released on December 8, 2009, it is Bocelli's eighth DVD release.

The concert was filmed, September 15, 2009, at the Kodak Theatre in Los Angeles, featuring Bocelli and Foster with additional guests including Natalie Cole, Mary J. Blige, Reba McEntire, Katherine Jenkins, The Mormon Tabernacle Choir, and The Muppets.

It was nominated for outstanding music direction at the 62nd Primetime Emmy Awards, in 2010.

== Broadcasting ==
It first aired on THIRTEEN’s Great Performances series, on Thanksgiving night in the United States, and continued to be broadcast in the U.S. and Canada, throughout December 2009. In late November, the program was broadcast in Mexico and in the UK; it later aired, December 15 and 25, on Italia 1, in Italy, December 19, on TVE2 and TROS, in Spain and the Netherlands, and Christmas Eve, on vtm and RTL-TVI, in Belgium and Luxembourg. The DVD of the full program was Internationally released December 8, 2009.

In December 2010, the special was broadcast again by PBS, throughout the U.S. and Canada.

== Deluxe CD/DVD Edition ==
A Deluxe Edition featuring the standard CD and a bonus DVD containing highlights from the concert was released on November 23, 2009. Another Deluxe Edition, containing the same DVD and, "Mi Navidad", the Spanish version of the album, was released December 1, 2009.
