= Russian State Archive of Literature and Art =

State archival institution in Moscow, Russia

Coordinates: 55°50′0.93″N 37°29′18.42″E

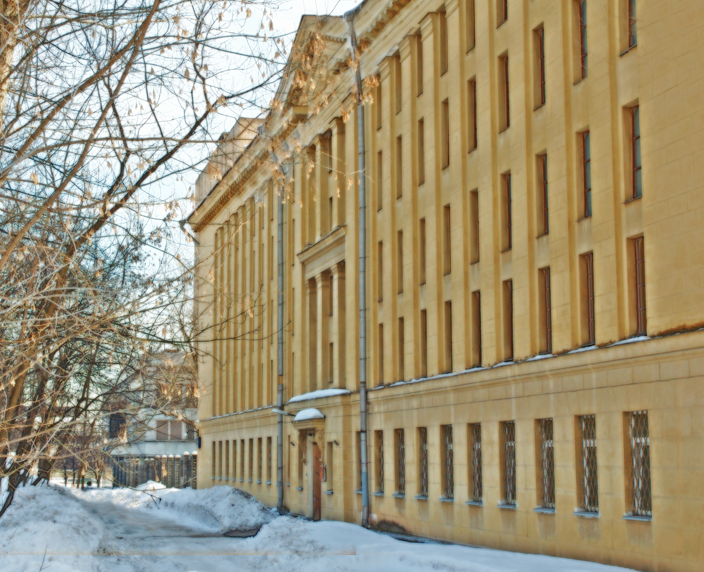
- Company type: Archive
- Founded: 1941
- Headquarters: Moscow, Russia
- Website: www.rgali.ru

The Russian State Archive of Literature and Art (Russian: Государственный архив литературы и искусства [РГАЛИ], or RGALI) is one of the largest state archives in Russia. It preserves documents of national literature, music, theatre, cinema, painting and architecture.

== History ==
As a centralized archive for documentation in the cultural sphere, RGALI was founded in 1941 under the name of TsGLA, on the basis of the collected manuscript holdings of the State Literary Museum (Goslitmuzei—GLM) and designated fonds from other museums and archives.
- 1941–1954 – Central State Literary Archive (TsGLA) (Russian: Центральный государственный литературный архив СССР (ЦГЛА СССР))
- 1954-VI.1992 – Central State Archive of Literature and Art of the USSR (TsGALI SSSR) (Russian: Центральный государственный архив литературы и искусства СССР (ЦГАЛИ СССР))
- 1992–present – Russian State Archive of Literature and Art (RGALI) (Russian: Государственный архив литературы и искусства (РГАЛИ))
