= Jean-Luc Ballestra =

French opera singer

Jean-Luc Ballestra (born 1976 in Nice) is a French contemporary baritone.

== Career ==
Ballestra was formed at the trumpet and singing at the music conservatory of his hometown. He quickly made contact with the stage and the public, and at the age of 20, he embodied Mars in Offenbach's Orphée aux enfers and Mercutio in Gounod's Roméo et Juliette at the Opéra de Nice.

In the following years, in several lyrical festivals, he approached a very broad repertoire: Moralès in Bizet's Carmen, Schaunard in Puccini's La Bohème, Johann in Massenet's Werther.

Invited at the Opéra Bastille, he played Pantalon in Prokoviev's The Love for Three Oranges and the Pilot in Wagner's Tristan and Isolde. In 2006, he was invited along with Roberto Alagna, at the Opéra national de Montpellier in a production of Cyrano de Bergerac by Franco Alfano.

== Awards ==
- "Lyrical Artist of the Year Revelation" at the Victoires de la musique classique in 2007.
