= Frank Strobel =

German conductor (born 1966)

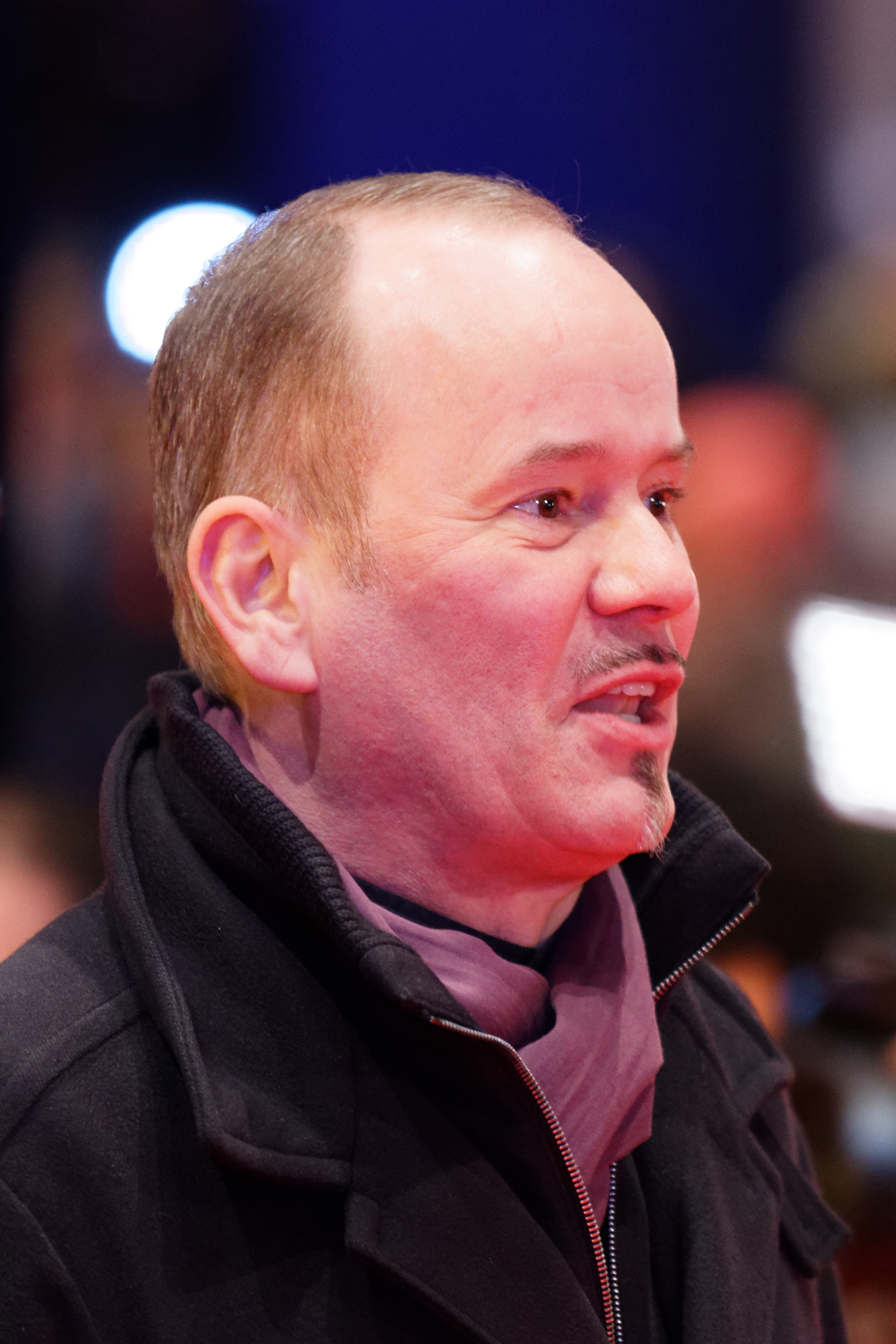
Frank Strobel in 2017

Frank Strobel (born in 1966 in Munich) is a German conductor known for premieres and performances of works by composers Sergei Prokofiev, Franz Schreker and Siegfried Wagner. He is authorized arranger and editor of works by the composer Alfred Schnittke and since 2001 has helped this composer built a reputation as a film composer in the German-speaking world. In addition, Strobel has been a pioneer in the interdisciplinary field of film and music for many years and is one of the protagonists of the "Film in concert" movement.

== Life ==
Having grown up in the environment of the cinema of his parents, Strobel came into contact with music at an early age. He learned to be a projectionist and developed a close relationship to the movies and thus also to film music. He finally became a musician and later became a conductor.

He had a special artistic relationship with Alfred Schnittke until the death of the latter, which can be seen in numerous premieres and CD recordings with the Rundfunk-Sinfonieorchester Berlin (RSB). In 1992 he conducted The Last Days of St. Petersburg for the ZDF in der Alte Oper in Frankfurt. In 1993 he played the adaption of Bulgakov The Master and Margarita with the Russian National Orchestra and with the Russian National Orchestra, the premiere of the concerto grosso Nr. 5. For Deutschlandradio and ZDF/Arte he conducted the recording and Frankfurt premiere of the 130-minute film music for large orchestra for The General Line (Eisenstein / Music: Taras Bujevski) with the Radio Symphony Orchestra Berlin in 1997.

Until 1998 he was chief conductor of the Deutsches Filmorchester Babelsberg. Since 2000 he has headed the European Film Philharmonic and is also artistic advisor to the silent film programme of ZDF/ARTE.

In the years after 2000, together with the RSB, he recorded several pieces by Schnittke, which he had edited at his request and presented to the public for the first time. In 2003 and 2004 he had great success in Berlin and Moscow with the concert to the film Alexander Nevsky based on the music of Sergei Prokofiev, which he performed again with the RSB. Here, too, it was a premiere edited by Strobel. He reconstructed the original score and reassembled it. In November 2004, Strobel received Russia's highest civilian award in the Bolshoi Theatre in Moscow.

In 2006 the film Rosenkavalier based on Richard Strauss's music - played by the Staatskapelle Dresden - was performed again under the leadership of Strobel. After his work on original music and the creation of new music, 40 silent film classics were set to music, shone in new splendour in concert halls and cinemas under his direction, and enjoyed great interest, especially through the broadcasts of the television stations ZDF, Arte, Süddeutscher Rundfunk, Saarländischer Rundfunk and 3sat, which recorded most of the events in cooperation with the Deutschlandfunk Kultur.

His conducting of the RSB at the world premiere of the reconstructed version of Metropolis on February 12, 2012 by the Berliner Philharmoniker received an outstanding media response. Friedrichstadt-Palast, where he also premiered Fritz Lang's film Der müde Tod in the 2006 digitally restored version with the new film music by Cornelius Schwehr commissioned by ZDF/ARTE.

Strobel also works for new cinema and television films, conducting leading European orchestras such as those in the United Kingdom and the United States, as well as radio and record releases. The film concerts of the Hamburger Symphoniker in the Laeiszhalle under Strobel, with which he is touring Germany under the banner of the private radio station Klassikradio, are legendary. Strobel is a globetrotter who has travelled throughout Europe, parts of North, Central and South America and Asia through his music.

In 2020, he conducted, with the Orchestre National de Lyon the original soundtrack of Kaamelott: The First Chapter, a French movie released in July 2021 and directed by Alexandre Astier, who also wrote the soundtrack.

== Sources ==
- Frank Strobel – Der Dirigent, ein Einzeltäter. Interview with S. Ilona Rieke. In Cinema Musica. Bremen 2006, issue 3 (January), p. 24–28. ISSN 1861-5309
