= Carmen discography =

This is a discography of audio and video recordings of Carmen, a French-language opera by Georges Bizet. The opera premiered at the Opéra-Comique in Paris on 3 March 1875. Carmen is one of the most frequently recorded operas, dating back to a near-complete German acoustical recording in 1908.

== Audio recordings ==
Year	Cast (Carmen, Don José, Micaëla, Escamillo)	Conductor, Opera house and orchestra	Label/Notes
1908	Emmy Destinn; Carl Jörn; Minnie Nast; Hermann Bachmann	Bruno Seidler-Winkler; Grammophone Orchestra Berlin; Berlin State Opera chorus (sung in German)	CD: Aura Music; Cat: LRC 1900; CD: Marston Records; Cat: 52022-2
1911	Marguerite Mérentié; Agustarello Affré; Aline Vallandri; Henri Albers	François Ruhlmann l'Orchestre Symphonique; Chœur de l'Opéra-Comique	CD: Malibran; Cat: MR 560; CD: Marston Records; Cat: 52019-2
1920	Fanny Anitùa; Luigi Bolis; Ines Maria Ferraris; Cesare Formichi	Unknown; Teatro alla Scala orchestra and chorus (sung in Italian)	LP: Columbia; Cat: D 5582-97
1927	Lucy Perelli; José de Trévi; Yvonne Brothier; Louis Musy	Piero Coppola; Chœur et Orchestre de l'Opéra-Comique	LP: Victor; Cat:
1928	Raymonde Visconti; Georges Thill; Marthe Nespoulous; Louis Guénot	Élie Cohen l'Orchestre Symphonique de Paris; Chœur de l'Opéra-Comique	LP: Columbia Recording; Cat: 27809
1931	Gabriella Besanzoni; Piero Pauli; Maria Carbone; Ernesto Besanzoni	Carlo Sabajno; Teatro alla Scala orchestra and chorus (sung in Italian)	CD: Myto Records; Cat:
1932	Aurora Buades; Aureliano Pertile; Ines Alfani Tellini; Benvenuto Franci	Lorenzo Molajoli; Teatro alla Scala orchestra and chorus (sung in Italian)	CD: Phonographe Records; Cat:
1937	Rosa Ponselle; René Maison; Hilda Burke; Julius Huehn	Gennaro Papi; Metropolitan Opera orchestra and chorus	CD: Walhall; Cat: WHL 15
1942	Germaine Cernay; Raymond Berthaud; Ginette Guillamat; Lucien Lovano	Désiré-Émile Inghelbrecht; Orchestre National de France	CD: Malibran-Music (Radio Provence); Cat: CDRG172
1942	Elisabeth Höngen; Torsten Ralf; Elfriede Weidlich; Josef Herrmann	Karl Böhm; Staatsoper Dresden orchestra and chorus (sung in German)	CD: Preiser; Cat: PR90152
1943	Lily Djanel; Raoul Jobin; Licia Albanese; Leonard Warren	Thomas Beecham; Metropolitan Opera orchestra and chorus	CD: Walhall; Cat: WLCD0006
1950	Solange Michel; Raoul Jobin; Martha Angelici; Michel Dens	André Cluytens; Chœur et Orchestre de l'Opéra-Comique	CD: EMI mono Cat: CMS5 65318-2; LP: Naxos Historical; Cat: 8.110238-39
1951	Risë Stevens; Jan Peerce; Licia Albanese; Robert Merrill	Fritz Reiner; RCA Victor orchestra	LP: RCA Victrola; Cat: AVM3-0670; CD: RCA Red Seal; Cat: 88843041212
1951	Suzanne Juyol; Libera de Luca; Janine Micheau; Julien Giovannetti	Albert Wolff; Opéra-Comique orchestra and chorus	CD: Preiser; Cat: LP: Decca; Cat: LXT2615-17
1952	Risë Stevens; Richard Tucker; Nadine Conner; Paolo Silveri	Fritz Reiner; Metropolitan Opera orchestra and chorus	CD: Sony Classical; Cat: 88697 96189 2
1952	Vera Borisenko; Georgii Nelepp; Elizaveta Shumskaya; Alexei Ivanov	Vassili Nebolsin; Bolshoi Theatre orchestra and chorus (sung in Russian)	LP: MK; Cat: DO1508-15
1954	Kerstin Meyer; Arne Hendriksen; Elisabeth Söderström; Sigurd Björling	Sixten Ehrling; Royal Swedish Opera orchestra and chorus (sung in Swedish)	CD: Bluebell; Cat: ABCD109
1954	Giulietta Simionato; Nicolai Gedda; Hilde Gueden; Michel Roux	Herbert von Karajan; Wiener Symphoniker; Singerverein	CD: Andante; Cat: AN3100
1954	Risë Stevens; Richard Tucker; Victoria de los Ángeles; Frank Guarrera	Tibor Kozma; Metropolitan Opera orchestra and chorus	CD: Gala; Cat: GL10063
1955	Giulietta Simionato; Giuseppe Di Stefano; Rosanna Carteri; Michel Roux	Herbert von Karajan; Teatro alla Scala orchestra and chorus	CD: Walhall; Cat: WLCD0156
1956	Risë Stevens; Giuseppe Di Stefano; Lucine Amara; Robert Merrill	Max Rudolf; Metropolitan Opera orchestra and chorus	CD: Golden Melodram; Cat: 50070
1957	Risë Stevens; Mario Del Monaco; Lucine Amara; Frank Guarrera	Dimitri Mitropoulos; Metropolitan Opera orchestra and chorus	CD: Living Stage; Cat: LS1093
1959	Victoria de los Ángeles; Nicolai Gedda; Janine Micheau; Ernest Blanc	Sir Thomas Beecham; Orchestre Philharmonique de Radio France	CD: EMI Classics; Cat: CMS567357 2
1959	Irina Arkhipova; Mario Del Monaco; Irina Maslennikova; Pavel Lisitsian	Alexander Melik-Pashayev; Bolshoi Theatre orchestra and chorus (sung in Russian and Italian)	CD: Myto; Cat: MCD053311
1959	Consuelo Rubio; Léopold Simoneau; Pierrette Alarie; Heinz Rehfuss	Pierre-Michel Le Conte; Concerts de Paris orchestra and Paris Conservatoire chorus	LP: Concert Hall; Cat:
1960	Sonia Cervená; Rolf Apreck; Maria Croonen; Robert Lauhöfer	Herbert Kegel; Rundfunk Sinfonie Orchester (sung in German)	CD: Classics; Cat: 0300119BC
1960	Irina Arkhipova; Mario Del Monaco; Marcella Pobbé; Ernest Blanc	Peter Maag; Teatro di San Carlo orchestra and chorus	CD: Gala; Cat: GL100676
1961	Christa Ludwig; Rudolf Schock; Melitta Muszely; Hermann Prey	Horst Stein; Berliner Symphoniker, chorus of Deutsche Oper Berlin (sung in German)	CD: EMI Electrola; Cat: 653 252 903-2
1962	Oralia Dominguez; Maria Stader; Josef Metternich; Josef Simandi	Ferenc Fricsay; Bavarian State Opera orchestra and chorus	LP: Deutsche Grammophon; Cat: 136032
1963	Regina Resnik; Mario Del Monaco; Joan Sutherland; Tom Krause	Thomas Schippers; Orchestre de la Suisse Romande; Grand Théâtre de Genève chorus	LP: Decca; Cat: /London
1964	Leontyne Price; Franco Corelli; Mirella Freni; Robert Merrill	Herbert von Karajan; Vienna Philharmonic orchestra Vienna State Opera chorus	LP: RCA Victor Red Seal; LSC-6199; CD: RCA Victor Red Seal; Cat: 7432139495 2; 1965 Grammy Award for Best Opera Recording
1964	Maria Callas; Nicolai Gedda; Andréa Guiot; Robert Massard	Georges Prêtre; Paris Opera orchestra and chorus	CD: EMI Classics; Cat:
1970	Grace Bumbry; Jon Vickers; Mirella Freni; Kostas Paskalis	Rafael Frühbeck de Burgos; Théâtre National de l'Opéra orchestra and chorus	CD: EMI Classics; Cat: 724358550528
1970	Anna Moffo; Franco Corelli; Helen Donath; Piero Cappuccilli	Lorin Maazel; Deutsche Oper Berlin orchestra and chorus	CD: Sony; Cat: 88697446202
1973	Marilyn Horne; James McCracken; Adriana Maliponte; Tom Krause	Leonard Bernstein; Metropolitan Opera orchestra and chorus	CD: Deutsche Grammophon; Cat: 0 28942 74402 8 SACD: PENTATONE; Cat: PTC 5186216
1974	Régine Crespin; Gilbert Py; Jeannette Pilou; José van Dam	Alain Lombard; Strasbourg Philharmonic Orchestra; Rhine Opera Chorus	LP: RCA-Erato; Cat:
1975	Tatiana Troyanos; Plácido Domingo; Kiri Te Kanawa; José van Dam	Sir Georg Solti; London Philharmonic Orchestra; John Alldis choir Haberdashers' Aske's Boys' School choir	CD: Decca; Cat: 414 489-2
1977	Teresa Berganza; Plácido Domingo; Ileana Cotrubaș; Sherrill Milnes	Claudio Abbado; London Symphony Orchestra; Ambrosian Singers	CD: Deutsche Grammophon; Cat:
1983	Agnes Baltsa; José Carreras; Katia Ricciarelli; José van Dam	Herbert von Karajan; Berliner Philharmoniker	CD: Deutsche Grammophon; Cat:
1984	Julia Migenes-Johnson; Plácido Domingo; Faith Esham; Ruggero Raimondi	Lorin Maazel; Orchestre National de France; Radio France chorus (film directed by Francesco Rosi)	CD: ERATO; Cat: ECD 880373
1988	Jessye Norman; Neil Shicoff; Mirella Freni; Simon Estes	Seiji Ozawa; Orchestre National de France; French National Radio Chorus	CD: Decca; Cat: 478 2488
1989	Elena Obraztsova; Vladimir Atlantov; Margarita Miglau; Yuri Mazurok	Yuri Simonov; Bolshoi Theatre orchestra and chorus (sung in Russian)	CD: Melodiya; Cat: MELCD1001516
1990	Graciela Alperyn; Giorgio Lamberti; Doina Palade; Alan Titus	Alexander Rahbari; Czechoslovak Radio Symphony orchestra Slovak Philharmonic chorus	CD: Naxos Opera Classics; Cat: 8660005-07
1994	Béatrice Uria-Monzon; Christian Papis; Leontina Vaduva; Vincent Le Texier	Alain Lombard; Orchestre National Bordeaux Aquitaine	CD: Auvidis Valois; Cat: V 4734
1995	Jennifer Larmore; Thomas Moser; Angela Gheorghiu; Samuel Ramey	Giuseppe Sinopoli; Bayerische Staatsoper orchestra and chorus	CD: Teldec; Cat: 0630126722
2002	Angela Gheorghiu; Roberto Alagna; Inva Mula; Thomas Hampson	Michel Plasson; Orchestre national du Capitole de Toulouse	CD: EMI Classics; Cat: 07243 557434 2 8
2002	Patricia Bardon; Julian Gavin; Mary Plazas; Gary Magee	David Parry; Philharmonia Orchestra; Geoffrey Mitchell Choir; New London Children's Choir (Sung in English)	CD: Chandos; Cat: CHAN3091
2010	Marina Domashenko; Andrea Bocelli; Eva Mei; Bryn Terfel	Myung-whun Chung; Orchestre Philharmonique de Radio France	CD: Decca; Cat:4757646
2012	Magdalena Kožená; Jonas Kaufmann; Genia Kühmeier; Kostas Smoriginas	Simon Rattle; Berlin Philharmonic; Deutsche Oper Berlin Chorus; Deutsche Staatsoper Children's Chorus	CD: EMI Classics; Cat: 50999 4 40285 2 7

== Video recordings ==
Year	Cast (Carmen, Don José, Micaëla, Escamillo)	Conductor, Opera house and orchestra	Label
1956	Belén Amparan; Franco Corelli; Elda Ribetti; Anselmo Colzani	Nino Sanzogno; Italian Television orchestra and chorus (video directed by Franco Enriquez)	DVD: Hardy; Cat: HCD4013
1967	Grace Bumbry; Jon Vickers; Mirella Freni; Justino Díaz	Herbert von Karajan; Vienna Philharmonic orchestra Vienna State Opera chorus	DVD: Deutsche Grammophon; Cat: 00440 073 4032
1978	Elena Obraztsova; Plácido Domingo; Isobel Buchanan; Yuri Mazurok	Carlos Kleiber; Vienna State Opera orchestra and chorus	DVD: TDK; Cat: 8 24121 00097 4
1984	Julia Migenes-Johnson; Plácido Domingo; Faith Esham; Ruggero Raimondi	Lorin Maazel; Orchestre National de France and chorus Children's Chorus of Radio France (film directed by Francesco Rosi)	DVD: Columbia TriStar; Cat: CDR 10530; Blu-ray: Gaumont; Cat: 750530
1985	Maria Ewing; Barry McCauley; Marie McLaughlin; David Holloway	Bernard Haitink; London Philharmonic Orchestra (recorded at Glyndebourne Festival Opera)	DVD: Warner/NVC Arts; Cat: 4509-99494-2
1987	Agnes Baltsa; José Carreras; Leona Mitchell; Samuel Ramey	James Levine; Metropolitan Opera orchestra and chorus (staged by Franco Zeffirelli, video director Brian Large)	DVD: Deutsche Grammophon; Cat: 00440 073 0009
2002	Anne Sofie von Otter; Marcus Haddock; Lisa Milne; Laurent Naouri	Philippe Jordan; London Philharmonic Orchestra (recorded at Glyndebourne Opera House)	DVD: Opus Arte; Cat: OA 0867 D
2006	Anna Caterina Antonacci; Jonas Kaufmann; Norah Amsellem; Ildebrando D'Arcangelo	Antonio Pappano; Royal Opera House orchestra and chorus (directed by Francesca Zambello)	DVD: Decca; Cat: 074 3312; Blu-ray: Decca; Cat: 3313
2009	Anna Caterina Antonacci; Andrew Richards; Anne-Catherine Gillet; Nicolas Cavallier	John Eliot Gardiner; Orchestre Révolutionnaire et Romantique; Monteverdi Choir, Maitrise des Hauts-de-Seine (directed by Adrian Noble)	DVD: Fra Musica; Cat: FRA004
2010	Elīna Garanča; Roberto Alagna; Barbara Frittoli; Teddy Tahu Rhodes	Yannick Nézet-Séguin; Metropolitan Opera orchestra and chorus (directed for the stage by Richard Eyre)	DVD: Deutsche Grammophon; Cat: 0044 073 4581 8
2010	Stéphanie d'Oustrac; Gordon Gietz; Olga Pasichnyk; Jean-Luc Ballestra	Jean-Claude Casadesus; Opéra de Lille orchestra and chorus (directed for the stage by Jean-François Sivadier)	DVD: France Inter; Cat: 597 501-9
2010	Christine Rice, Bryan Hymel, Maija Kovaļevska, Aris Argiris	Constantinos Carydis, Chorus & Orchestra of the Royal Opera House (Recorded live at the Royal Opera House, Covent Garden, June 2010; Francesca Zambello, stage director)	3D Blu-ray: Opus Arte; Cat: OA3D7096D
2017	Elīna Garanča; Roberto Alagna; Maria Agresta; Ildar Abdrazakov	Mark Elder; Opéra national de Paris orchestra and chorus (Recorded live, Opéra Bastille; Calixto Bieito, stage director)	HD video: Paris Opera Play, medici.tv
2018	Anna Goryachova; Francesco Meli; Kristina Mkhitaryan; Kostas Smoriginas	Jakub Hrůša; The Royal Opera orchestra and chorus (Recorded live, 6 March 2018; Barrie Kosky, production)	HD video: Royal Opera Stream
2022	Elīna Garanča; Brian Jagde; Maria Teresa Leva; Claudio Sgura	Marco Armiliato; Arena di Verona Orchestra & Chorus (Recorded live, August; Franco Zeffirelli, production)	HD video: Unitel
2024	Aigul Akhmetshina; Piotr Beczała; Angel Blue; Kyle Ketelsen	Daniele Rustioni; Metropolitan Opera orchestra and chorus (Recorded live, 27 January 2024; Carrie Cracknell, production)	HD video: Met Opera on Demand
