= Les pêcheurs de perles =

1863 opera by Georges Bizet

- Opera by Georges Bizet
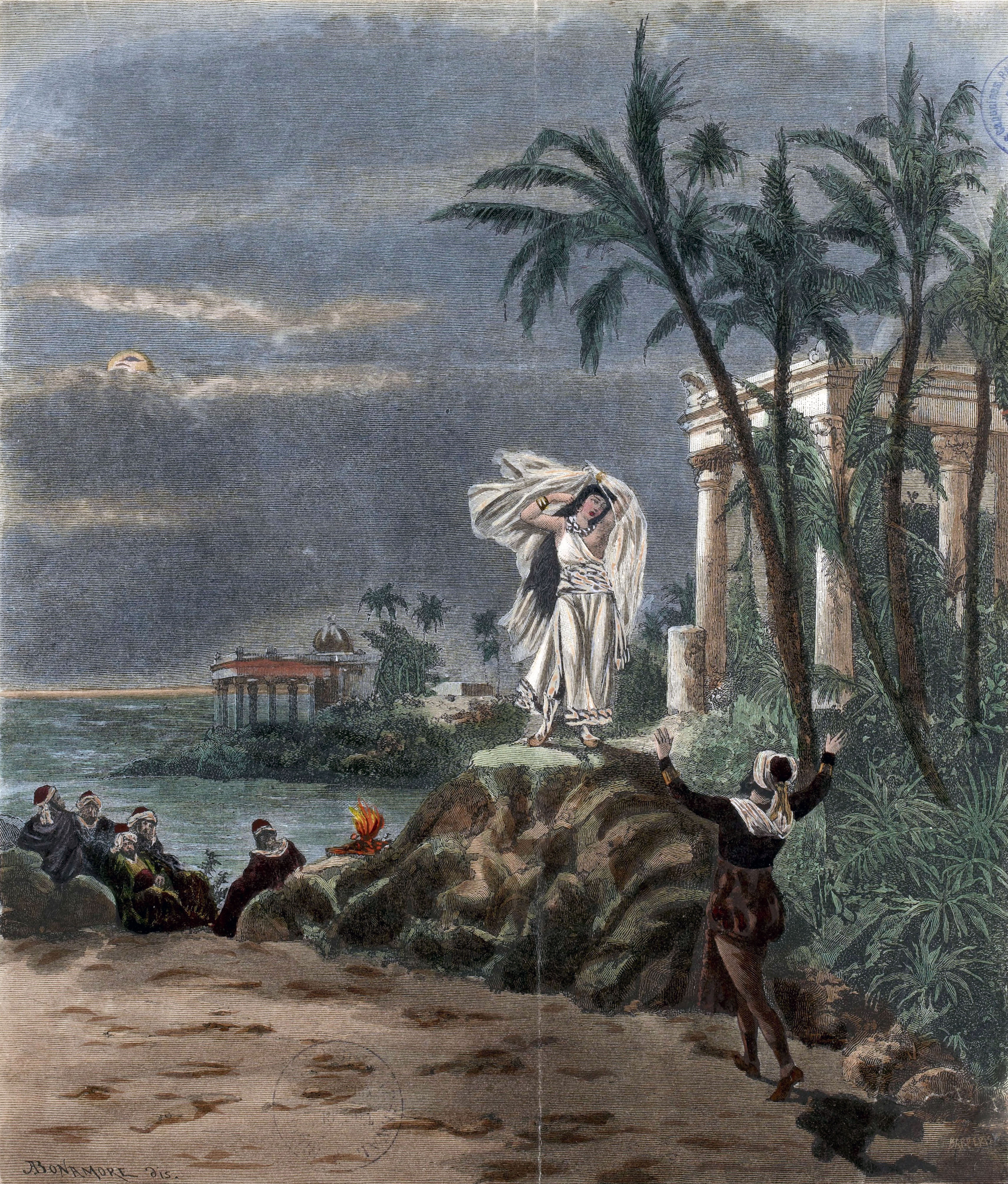
- Final scene of act 1 (La Scala, 1886)
- Librettist: Eugène Cormon; Michel Carré
- Language: French
- Premiere: 30 September 1863; Théâtre Lyrique, Paris

Les pêcheurs de perles (French pronunciation: [le pɛʃœʁ də pɛʁl], The Pearl Fishers) is an opera in three acts by the French composer Georges Bizet, to a libretto by Eugène Cormon and Michel Carré. It was premiered on 30 September 1863 at the Théâtre Lyrique in Paris, and was given 18 performances in its initial run. Set in ancient times on the island of Ceylon (Sri Lanka), the opera tells the story of how two men's vow of eternal friendship is threatened by their love for the same woman, whose own dilemma is the conflict between secular love and her sacred oath as a priestess. The friendship duet "Au fond du temple saint", generally known as "The Pearl Fishers Duet", is one of the best-known in Western opera.

At the time of the premiere, Bizet (born on 25 October 1838) was not yet 25 years old: he had yet to establish himself in the Parisian musical world. The commission to write Les pêcheurs arose from his standing as a former winner of the prestigious Prix de Rome. Despite a good reception by the public, press reactions to the work were generally hostile and dismissive, although other composers, notably Hector Berlioz, found considerable merit in the music. The opera was not revived in Bizet's lifetime, but from 1886 onwards it was performed with some regularity in Europe and North America, and from the mid-20th century has entered the repertory of opera houses worldwide. Because the autograph score was lost, post-1886 productions were based on amended versions of the score that contained significant departures from the original. Since the 1970s, efforts have been made to reconstruct the score in accordance with Bizet's intentions.

Modern critical opinion has been kinder than that of Bizet's day. Commentators describe the quality of the music as uneven and at times unoriginal, but acknowledge the opera as a work of promise in which Bizet's gifts for melody and evocative instrumentation are clearly evident. They have identified clear foreshadowings of the composer's genius which would culminate, 10 years later, in Carmen. Since 1950 the work has been recorded on numerous occasions, in both the revised and original versions.

== Background ==
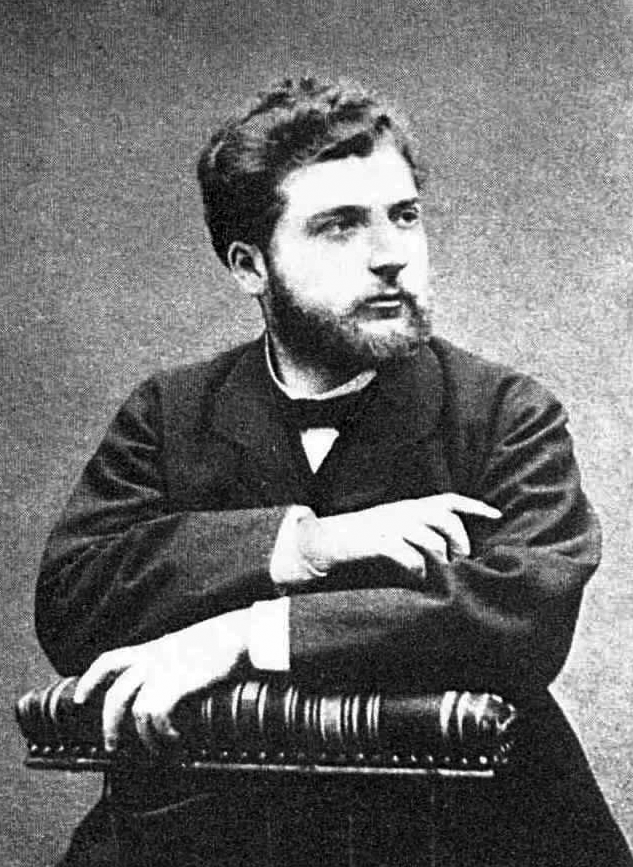
Georges Bizet in the early 1860s

Bizet's first opera, the one-act Le docteur Miracle, was written in 1856 when the 18-year-old composer was a student at the Conservatoire de Paris. It was Bizet's winning entry in a competition organised by the celebrated composer Jacques Offenbach, and gained him a cash award, a gold medal, and a performance of the prize work at the Théâtre des Bouffes-Parisiens. In 1857 Bizet was awarded the prestigious Prix de Rome, and as a result spent most of the following three years in Italy, where he wrote Don Procopio, a short opera buffa in the style of Donizetti. By this time Bizet had written several non-stage works, including his Symphony in C, but the poor reception accorded to his 1858 Te Deum, a religious work he composed in Rome, helped convince him that his future lay primarily with the musical theatre. He planned and possibly began several operatic works before his return to Paris in 1860, but none of these projects came to fruition.

In Paris, Bizet discovered the difficulties faced by young and relatively unknown composers trying to get their operas performed. Of the capital's two state-subsidised opera houses, the Opéra and the Opéra-Comique, the former offered a static repertoire in which works by foreign composers, particularly Rossini and Meyerbeer, were dominant. Even established French composers such as Gounod had difficulty getting works performed there. At the Opéra-Comique, innovation was equally rare; although more French works were performed, the style and character of most productions had hardly changed since the 1830s. However, one condition of the Opéra-Comique's state funding was that from time to time it should produce one-act works by former Prix de Rome laureates. Under this provision, Bizet wrote La guzla de l'Emir, with a libretto by Jules Barbier and Michel Carré, and this went into rehearsal early in 1862.

In April 1862, as the La guzla rehearsals proceeded, Bizet was approached by Léon Carvalho, manager of the independent Théâtre Lyrique company. Carvalho had been offered an annual grant of 100,000 francs by the retiring Minister of Fine Arts, Count Walewski, on condition that each year he stage a new three-act opera from a recent Prix de Rome winner. Carvalho had a high opinion of Bizet's abilities, and offered him the libretto of Les pêcheurs de perles, an exotic story by Carré and Eugène Cormon set on the island of Ceylon (now Sri Lanka). Sensing the opportunity for a genuine theatrical success, Bizet accepted the commission. Because Walewski restricted his grant to composers who had not had any previous work performed commercially, Bizet hurriedly withdrew La guzla from the Opéra-Comique; it has never been performed, and the music has disappeared.

== Roles ==
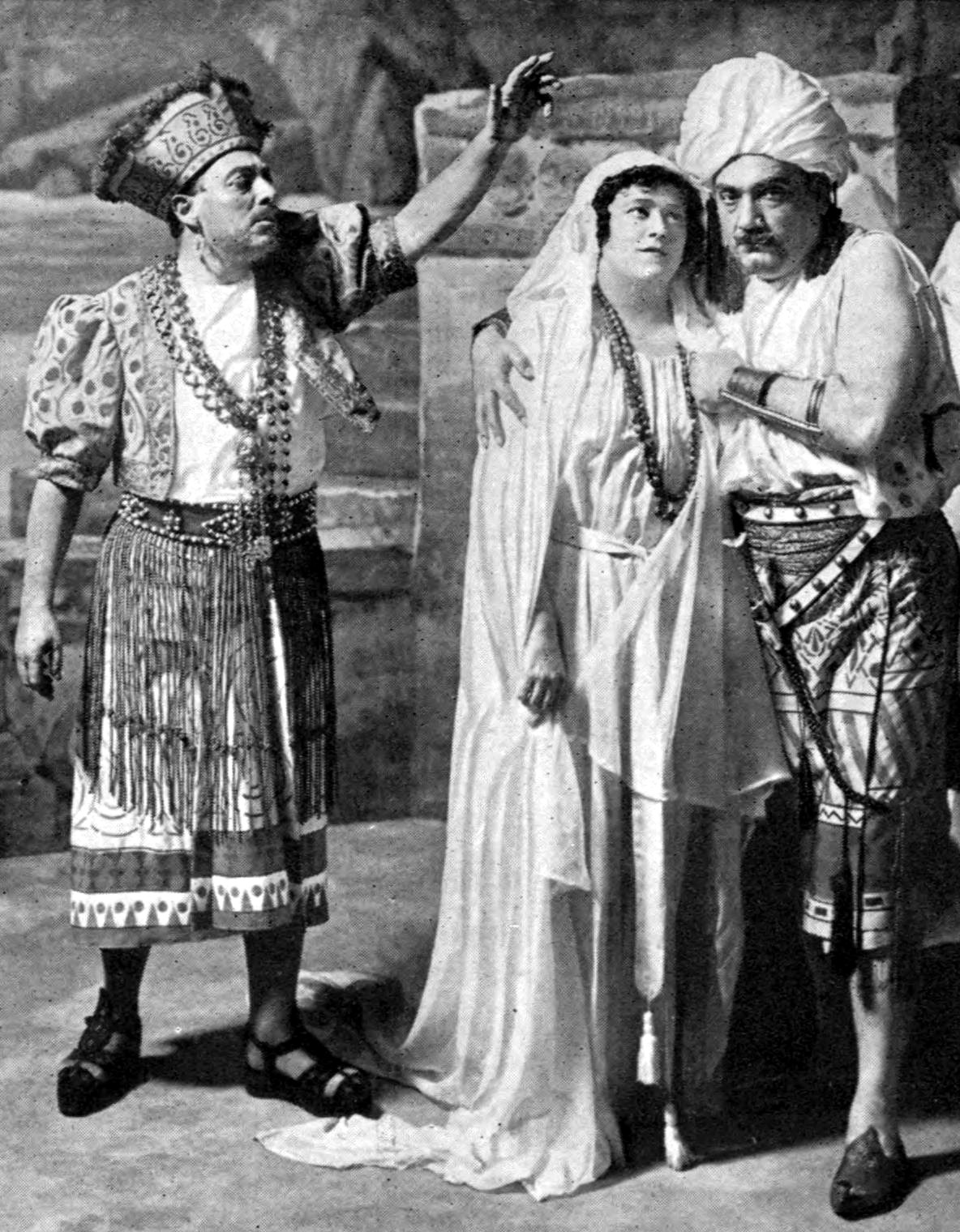
From left to right: Giuseppe De Luca (Zurga), Frieda Hempel (Leila) and Enrico Caruso (Nadir), in the New York Metropolitan Opera 1916 production

Roles, voice types, premiere cast
Role	Voice type	Premiere cast, 30 September 1863 Conductor: Adolphe Deloffre
Leïla, a priestess of Brahma	soprano	Léontine de Maësen
Nadir, a fisherman	tenor	François Morini
Zurga, head fisherman	baritone	Ismaël
Nourabad, high priest of Brahma	bass	Prosper Guyot
Chorus of fishermen, virgins, priests and priestesses of Brahma

== Synopsis ==
Place: Ceylon
Time: Ancient times

=== Act 1 ===
The scene is a desolate seashore, with the ruins of a Hindu temple in the background. A chorus of pearl fishermen sing of the dangerous tasks that lie ahead ("Sur la grève en feu"), and perform ritual dances to drive away evil spirits. They then elect one of their number, Zurga, as their leader, or "king". Nadir enters, and is hailed by Zurga as a long-lost friend. Left alone, the pair reminisce about their past in the city of Kandy, where their friendship was nearly destroyed by their mutual love of a young priestess whose beauty they had glimpsed briefly. They had each renounced their love for this stranger and had sworn to remain true to each other. Now, reunited, they affirm once again that they will be faithful until death ("Au fond du temple saint").

A boat draws up on the beach bearing the veiled figure of Leila, the virgin priestess whose prayers are required to ensure the safety of the fishermen. Although neither Nadir nor Zurga recognises her, she is the woman from Kandy with whom both had been in love. As Zurga is explaining her duties, she recognises Nadir, but she says nothing and shortly afterwards is led up to the temple by the high priest Nourabad. Zurga and the fishermen go down to the sea, leaving Nadir alone. In a troubled soliloquy before he sleeps he recalls how, in Kandy, he had broken his vows to Zurga and pursued his love for the veiled woman ("Je crois entendre encore"). It was the rumour that she might be found in this place that brought him here. Alone in the temple, Leila prays and sings. Nadir wakes and, recognising the voice of his long-desired lover, traces it to the temple. Leila briefly draws her veil aside, he sees it is she and the pair declare their renewed passion. On the beach, the fishermen plead with her to continue protecting them, but she tells Nadir she will sing for him alone ("O Dieu Brahma").

=== Act 2 ===
In the temple with Nourabad, Leila expresses fear at being left alone, but Nourabad exhorts her to be brave and to fulfil her vows to Brahma on pain of her own death. She tells him of the courage she once displayed when, as a child, she had hidden a fugitive from his enemies and refused to give him up even when threatened with death ("J'étais encore enfant"). The fugitive had rewarded her with a necklace that he asked her always to wear. She had kept this promise, as she would her vows. On the priest's departure, Leila quietly muses on the former times when she and Nadir would meet together secretly ("Comme autrefois dans la nuit sombre"). Nadir then enters; in her fear of Nourabad's threats Leila begs him to leave, but he remains and the two declare their love in a passionate duet ("Léïla! Léïla!...Dieu puissant, le voilà!"). He goes, promising to return next night, but as he leaves he is captured by the fishermen and brought back to the temple. Zurga, as the fishermen's leader, at first resists the fishermen's calls for Nadir's execution and advocates mercy. However, after Nourabad removes Leila's veil, Zurga recognises her as his former love; consumed by jealousy and rage, he orders that both Nadir and Leila be put to death. A violent storm erupts, as the fishermen unite in singing a hymn to Brahma ("Brahma divin Brahma!").

=== Act 3 ===
In his tent on the beach, Zurga notes that the storm has abated, as has his rage; he now feels remorse for his anger towards Nadir ("L'orage s'est calmé"). Leila is brought in; Zurga is captivated by her beauty as he listens to her pleas for Nadir's life, but his jealousy is rekindled. He confesses his love for her, but refuses mercy ("Je suis jaloux"). Nourabad and some of the fishermen enter to report that the funeral pyre is ready. As Leila is taken away, Zurga observes her giving one of the fishermen her necklace, asking for its return to her mother. With a shout, Zurga rushes out after the group and seizes the necklace.

Outside the temple, Nadir waits beside the funeral pyre as the crowd, singing and dancing, anticipates the dawn and the coming double execution ("Dès que le soleil"). He is joined by Leila; resigned now to their deaths, the pair sing of how their souls will soon be united in heaven. A glow appears in the sky, and Zurga rushes in to report that the fishermen's camp is ablaze. As the men hurry away to save their homes, Zurga frees Leila and Nadir. He returns the necklace to Leila, and reveals that he is the man she saved when she was a child. He recognises now that his love for her is in vain, and tells her and Nadir to flee. As the couple depart, singing of the life of love that awaits them, Zurga is left alone, to await the fishermen's return ("Plus de crainte ... Rêves d'amour, adieu!").

(In the revised version of the ending introduced after the opera's 1886 revival, Nourabad witnesses Zurga's freeing of the prisoners and denounces him to the fishermen, one of whom stabs Zurga to death as the last notes sound of Leila and Nadir's farewell song. In some variations Zurga meets his death in other ways, and his body is consigned to the pyre.)

== Writing and compositional history ==
The libretto was written by Eugène Cormon and Michel Carré. Cormon was a prolific author of libretti and straight drama, usually in collaboration with other writers. In his career he wrote or co-wrote at least 135 works, of which Les dragons de Villars, set to music by Aimé Maillart, was perhaps the most successful.

Michel Carré

Carré, who had initially trained as a painter, had worked with Jules Barbier on Gounod's opera Faust and had co-written the play Les contes fantastiques d'Hoffmann, which became the basis of the libretto for Offenbach's opera The Tales of Hoffmann. Before Les pêcheurs de perles Cormon and Carré had previously written a libretto for Maillart on a similar theme, Les pêcheurs de Catane, which had been performed in 1860; they had originally planned to set their new story in Mexico before changing its location to Ceylon.

By general critical consent the libretto of Les pêcheurs de perles is a work of poor quality. The weak plot, as Bizet's biographer Winton Dean observes, turns on the unlikely coincidence regarding Leila's necklace, and no real effort is made in the text to bring any of the characters to life: "They are the regulation sopranos, tenors, etc., with their faces blacked". Mina Curtiss, in her book on Bizet, dismisses the text as banal and imitative. Donal Henahan of The New York Times, writing in 1986, said that the libretto "rank[ed] right down there with the most appallingly inept of its kind". The writers themselves admitted its shortcomings: Cormon commented later that had they been aware of Bizet's quality as a composer, they would have tried harder. Carré was worried about the weak ending, and constantly sought suggestions for changing it; Curtiss records that in exasperation, the theatre manager Carvalho suggested that Carré burn the libretto. This facetious remark, Curtiss asserts, led Carré to end the opera with the fishermen's tents ablaze as Leila and Nadir make their escape.

Because he did not receive Carvalho's commission until April 1863, with the projected opening night set for mid-September, Bizet composed quickly with, Curtiss says, "a tenacity and concentration quite foreign to him in his Roman days". He had some music available on which he could draw; through the previous winter he had worked on the score of an opera, Ivan IV with the promise, which fell through, that the work would be staged in Baden-Baden. Ivan IV provided music for three numbers in Les pêcheurs de perles: the prelude; part of Zurga's "Une fille inconnue"; and the third act duet "O lumière sainte". The "Brahma divin Brahma" chorus was adapted from the rejected Te Deum, and the chorus "Ah chante, chante encore" from Don Procopio. It is also likely that music composed for the cancelled La guzla de l'émir found its way into the new opera's score, which was completed by early August. The libretto was changed frequently during the creation process, even when the work had reached the rehearsal stage; the chorus "L'ombre descend" was added at Bizet's request, and other numbers were shortened or removed.

== Performance history and reception ==
=== Premiere and initial run ===
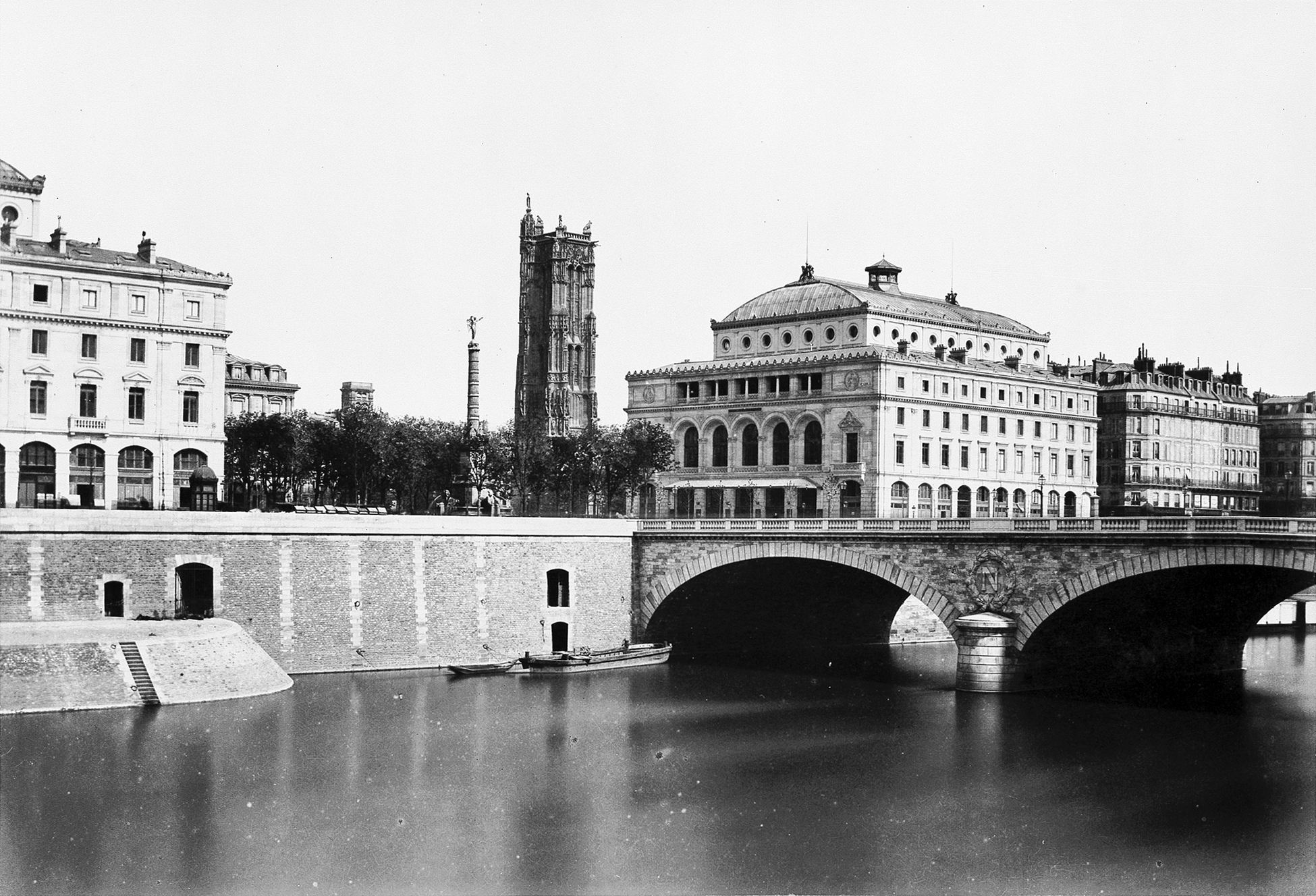
Théâtre Lyrique (centre right), Paris, where Les pêcheurs de perles received its first performance on 30 September 1863

The premiere, originally planned for 14 September 1863, was postponed to the 30th because of the illness of the soprano lead, Léontine de Maësen. The first-night audience at the Théâtre Lyrique received the work well, and called for Bizet at the conclusion. The writer Louis Gallet, who later would provide several librettos for Bizet, described the composer on this occasion as "a little dazed ... a forest of thick curly hair above a round, still rather childish face, enlivened by the quick brown eyes..." The audience's appreciation was not reflected in the majority of the press reviews, which generally castigated both the work and what they considered Bizet's lack of modesty in appearing on stage. Gustave Bertrand in Le Ménestrel wrote that "this sort of exhibition is admissible only for a most extraordinary success, and even then we prefer to have the composer dragged on in spite of himself, or at least pretending to be". Another critic surmised that the calls for the composer had been orchestrated by a "claque" of Bizet's friends, strategically distributed.

Of the opera itself, Benjamin Jouvin of Le Figaro wrote: "There were neither fishermen in the libretto nor pearls in the music". He considered that on every page the score displayed "the bias of the school to which [Bizet] belongs, that of Richard Wagner". Bertrand compared the work unfavourably with those of contemporary French composers such as Charles Gounod and Félicien David. "Nevertheless", he wrote, "there is a talent floating in the midst of all these regrettable imitations". Hector Berlioz was a voice apart in the general critical hostility; his review of the work in Journal des Débats praised the music's originality and subtlety: "The score of Les pêcheurs de perles does M. Bizet the greatest honour", he wrote. Among Bizet's contemporaries, the dramatist Ludovic Halévy wrote that this early work announced Bizet as a composer of quality: "I persist in finding in [the score] the rarest virtues". The youthful composer Émile Paladilhe told his father that the opera was superior to anything that the established French opera composers of the day, such as Auber and Thomas, were capable of producing.

In its initial run Les pêcheurs de perles ran for 18 performances, alternating with Mozart's The Marriage of Figaro. It closed on 23 November 1863, and although it brought the theatre little financial success, Bizet had won admiration from his peers. Carvalho was satisfied enough to ask Bizet to quickly finish Ivan IV, with a view to its early production at the Théâtre Lyrique. This idea eventually came to nothing; Ivan IV remained unperformed until 1946.

=== Early revivals ===
After its opening run, Les pêcheurs was not performed again until 11 years after Bizet's death when, on 20 March 1886, it was presented in Italian at La Scala, Milan. After this it received regular stagings in European cities, often with the Italian version of the libretto. These revivals, which possibly reflected the growing success of Carmen, were followed by the publication of several versions of the music that incorporated significant differences from Bizet's original. In particular the finale was altered, to provide a more dramatic ending—"a grand Meyerbeerian holocaust" according to Dean. This revised conclusion included a trio composed by Benjamin Godard. These corrupted scores remained the basis of productions for nearly a century.

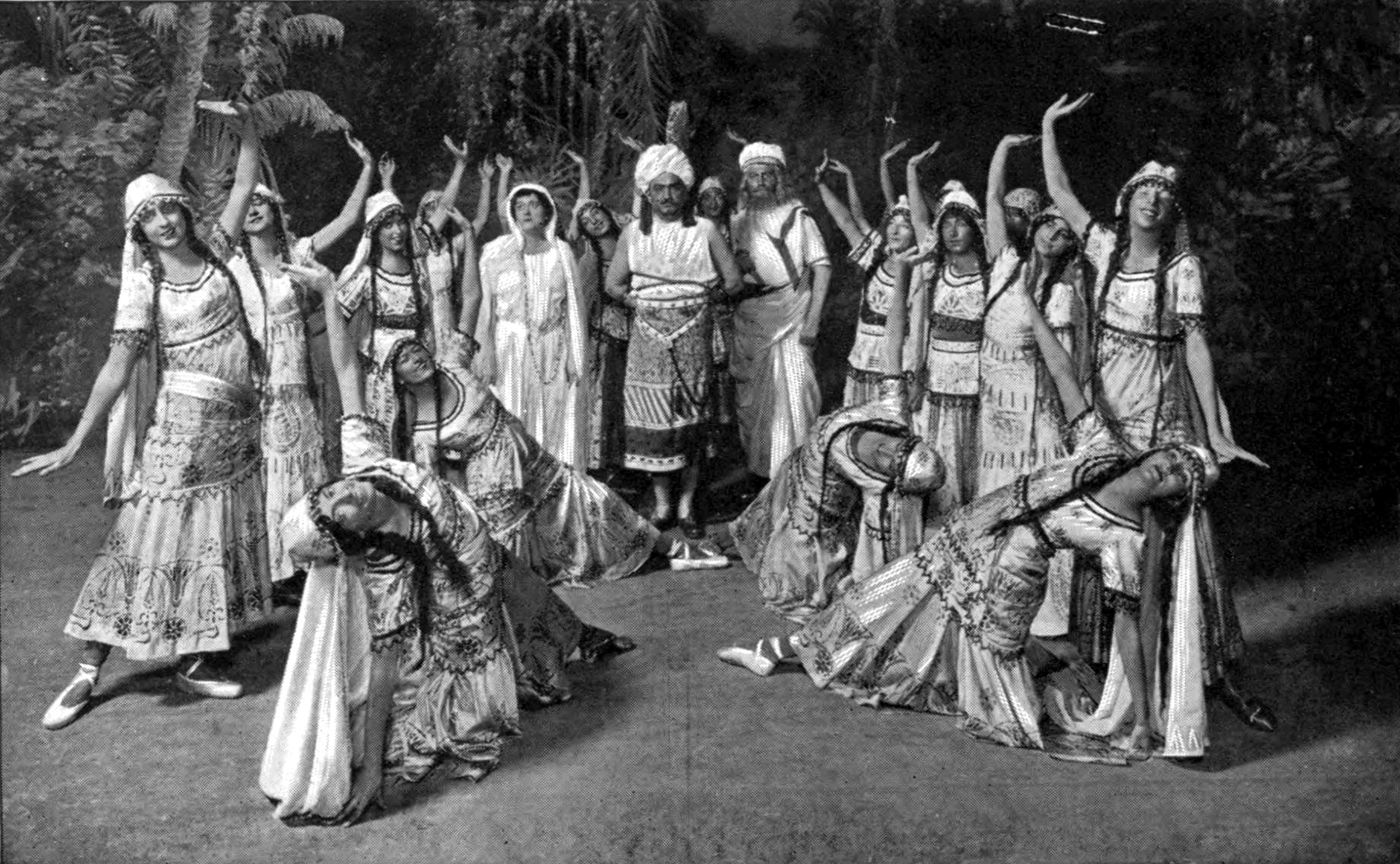
Scene from the 1916 production at the New York Metropolitan Opera

The opera received its British premiere on 22 April 1887, at London's Royal Opera House, Covent Garden, under the title Leila. The part of Nadir was sung by Paul Lhérie, the original Don José in the 1875 Carmen. Press reactions were muted; The Times's music critic found much of the music incompatible with the exotic setting—the hymn to Brahma was, he suggested, reminiscent of a Lutheran chorale. The Observer's reporter found "no trace of genuine inspiration", and drew unfavourable comparisons with Carmen. When Covent Garden repeated the production in May 1889, the Princess of Wales and other members of the British royal family were present. The Manchester Guardian's correspondent praised the singers but found that the work "becomes weaker and weaker as it goes on".

Les pêcheurs returned to Paris on 20 April 1889, when it was performed—in Italian—at the Théâtre de la Gaîté. Despite a distinguished cast—Emma Calvé, Jean-Alexandre Talazac and Lhérie, now a baritone, in the role of Zurga—critical reviews were no more enthusiastic than those which had greeted the original performances. Le Ménestrel excused Bizet on account of his youth, while The Manchester Guardian's report summed up the Parisian view of the work as "almost entirely lacking in ... boldness & originality". On 24 April 1893 Carvalho revived the work, in French, at the Opéra-Comique, its first performance at what would later become its regular home.

Productions continued to proliferate in Europe, and further afield; on 25 August 1893 the opera received its American premiere at the Grand Opera House in Philadelphia. Two-and-a-half years later, on 11 January 1896, the first two acts were performed at the New York Metropolitan Opera (the "Met"), as part of a programme that included Jules Massenet's one-act opera La Navarraise. The cast was led by Calvé and the Italian baritone Mario Ancona.

The Met's first complete staging of the opera came 20 years later, on 13 November 1916, when a star cast that included Enrico Caruso, Frieda Hempel and Giuseppe De Luca gave three performances. According to W. H. Chase in the Evening Sun, the act 1 duet "brought down the house in a superb blending of the two men's voices"; later, in "Je crois entendre encore", Caruso "did some of the most artistic singing in plaintive minor". In The Sun, W. J. Henderson, praised Hempel for her "ravishing upper tones", Da Luca was "a master of the delicate finish", and the bass Léon Rothier, in the small part of Nourabad, "filled Bizet's requirements perfectly".

=== Entering the mainstream ===
In the years after the First World War the work lost popularity with opera-house directors, and it was seen less frequently. The Met did not repeat its 1916 production, though individual numbers from the work—most frequently the famous duet and Leila's "Comme autrefois"—were regularly sung at the Met's concert evenings. The 1930s saw a return of interest in the opera, with productions in new venues including Nuremberg and the Berlin State Opera. Some revivals were unconventional: one German production used a rewritten libretto based on a revised storyline in which Leila, transformed into a defiant Carmen-like heroine, commits suicide at the end of the final scene. Paris's Opéra-Comique staged a more traditional production in 1932, and again in 1938, Bizet's centenary year. From that time onward it has remained in the Opéra-Comique repertory.

After the Second World War, although the opera was shunned by Covent Garden, the Sadler's Wells company presented it in March 1954. The Times announced this production as the first known use in Britain of the opera's English libretto. The stage designs for this production, which was directed by Basil Coleman, were by John Piper.

In the early 1970s, Arthur Hammond orchestrated the sections of the neglected 1863 vocal score that had been cut out from the post-1886 scores. This led to a production in 1973, by Welsh National Opera, of a version close to Bizet's original, without Godard's trio and Zurga's violent death—the first modern performance to incorporate the original ending.

The Sadler's Wells production was revived several times, but it was not until September 1987 that the company, by then transformed into English National Opera (ENO), replaced it with a new staging directed by Philip Prowse. The Guardian's report on this production mentioned that the "Pearl Fishers Duet" had recently topped the list in a poll of the public's "best tunes", and described the opera as "one of the most sweetly tuneful in the French repertory". This production "...[brought] out its freshness, never letting it become sugary". Although the run was a sell-out, ENO's managing director Peter Jonas disliked the production, and refused to revive it. It did not reappear in ENO's repertory until 1994, after Jonas's departure.

=== Modern productions ===
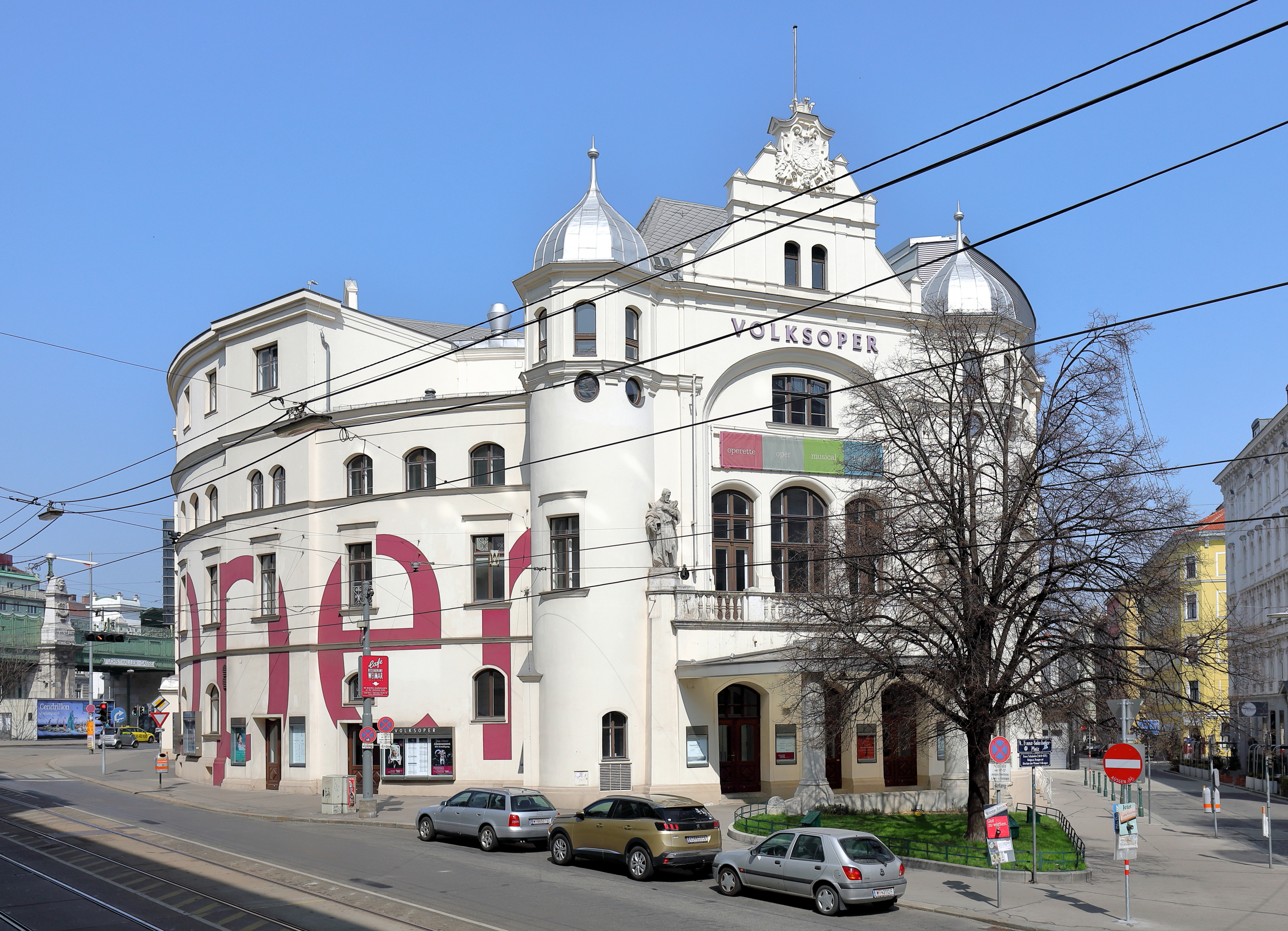
Vienna Volksoper, which staged Les pêcheurs de perles in 1994, the city's first production of the opera

In the latter years of the 20th century the opera was a regular feature in many European cities, and was still breaking new ground; in 1990 it made its debut at the Slovak National Theatre in Bratislava. Vienna saw it for the first time in 1994, at the Vienna Volksoper, in what John Rockwell in the New York Times described as "an awkwardly updated production", though well performed. The opera had not so far proved particularly popular in the United States, where since the Met's premiere of 1916, performances had been rare compared with Europe. Lyric Opera of Chicago staged it in 1966, but waited until 1998 before reviving it. In 1980 the New York City Opera mounted a production based on the 1863 edition, and staged it again in 1983 and 1986. Reviewing the 1986 production, Donal Henahan wrote that despite the inept libretto the work was saved by the "melodic suppleness and warmth" of Bizet's score.

San Diego Opera first staged the work in 1993, but it was this company's 2004 production, designed by Zandra Rhodes, that generated new levels of enthusiasm for the opera throughout the United States. In the following few years this production was shown in seven other U.S. opera houses; in October 2008 James C. Whitson, in Opera News, reported that worldwide, "between 2007 and 2009, half of all major production of the piece have been or will be ... in the U.S.". San Diego's director, Ian Campbell, suggested that his company's 2004 production was "created at a time when it seemed many U.S. opera companies were looking for a not-too-expensive production with melody, and a little off the beaten track .... [Our] Les pêcheurs de perles fitted the bill".

In January 2008 the opera received its first performance in Sri Lanka, the land of its setting. The conductor, Benjamin Levy, directed a large group of singers and musicians, mostly young and local. In October 2010, after an interval of more than 120 years, the opera was reintroduced to London's Royal Opera House. Two concert performances were given using a new edition of the score, prepared by Brad Cohen after the discovery in the Bibliothèque nationale de France of Bizet's 1863 conducting score. Commenting on this performance in The Daily Telegraph, Rupert Christiansen drew attention to the "musing intimacy and quiet dignity" with which the duet was sung, as compared with more traditional macho renderings.

The New York Metropolitan Opera presented a new production of the work in 2016, the first time the opera had been performed there for nearly a hundred years. Although many cities choose concert performances, there were several stage productions, in 2024 i.e. in Berlin, Bordeaux, Cologne, Munich, the Moravian Theatre in Olomouc, Palermo, the Grand Théâtre Massenet of the Opéra de Saint-Étienne, Saint Petersburg and Stara Zagora.

== Music ==
The opera begins with a brief orchestral prelude, the principal theme of which prefigures Leila's entrance. The opening chorus is punctuated by a lively dance—the critic John W. Klein describes it as "electrifying". Nadir's first significant contribution is his aria "Des savanes et des forêts", sung to an accompaniment of cellos and bassoons under a string tremolo that indicates the possible influence of Meyerbeer. Flutes and harps are used to introduce the main theme of the celebrated "Pearl Fishers Duet", in what the opera historian Hervé Lacombe identifies as "the most highly developed poetic scene in the opera". The duet's theme has become the opera's principal musical signature, repeated in the work whenever the issue of the men's friendship arises—though in Dean's view the tune is not worthy of the weight it carries. (Note: In the amended post-1886 versions of the score the duet is extended by the removal of the following number, "Amitié sainte", which is replaced with a repeat of the duet. Some critics think that this arrangement is superior to Bizet's original.) Dean suggests that Bizet's ability to find the appropriate musical phrase with style and economy is better demonstrated in his treatment of Leila's oath of chastity, where a simple phrase is repeated twice in minor third steps. Nadir's aria "Je crois entendre encore", towards the end of act 1, is written on a barcarole rhythm, with a dominant cor anglais whereby, says Lacombe, "[t]he listener has the impression that the horn is singing".

"Je crois entendre" (I Hear as in a Dream)
Sung by Enrico Caruso in 1904

"Romance de Nadir" (encore of "Je crois entendre")
Sung by Joseph Rogatechwsky in 1928

"Comme autrefois dans la nuit sombre" (Cavatine de Leila)
Sung by Amelita Galli-Curci in 1921 with orchestra conducted by Josef Pasternack

"De mon amie fleur endormie"
Sung by Caruso in 1916

In act 2 a short orchestral introduction is followed by an off-stage chorus, notable for its sparse accompaniment—a tambourine and two piccolos. After Nourabad reminds Leila of her oath and leaves her alone she sings her cavatina "Comme autrefois". Two French horns introduce the theme, supported by the cellos. When her voice enters, says Lacombe, "it replaces the first horn whose characteristic sound it seems to continue". Dean likens this song to Micaela's aria "Je dis que rien ne m'épouvante" from Carmen. Nadir's "De mon amie" which follows the cavatina has, says Dean, "a haunting beauty"; its introductory phrase recalls the oboe theme in Bizet's youthful Symphony in C. Dean cites the second act finale, with its repeated climaxes as the crowds demand the errant couple's deaths, as an example of Bizet's developing skills in writing theatrical music. The third act, divided into two brief scenes, begins with Zurga's entrance to quiet chromatic scales played over a tonic pedal, an effect that Bizet would later use in his incidental music to L'Arlésienne. The duet "Je frémis", says Dean, has clear hints of Verdi's Il trovatore, and the fiery chorus "Dès que le soleil" is reminiscent of a Mendelssohn scherzo, but otherwise the final act's music is weak and lacking in dramatic force. In the closing scene, in which Zurga bids a last farewell to his dreams of love, the friendship theme from the act 1 duet sounds for the final time.

According to Lacombe, Les pêcheurs de perles is characteristic of French opéra lyrique, in particular through Bizet's use of arioso and dramatic recitative, his creation of atmospheres, and his evocation of the exotic. Berlioz described the opera's score as beautiful, expressive, richly coloured and full of fire, but Bizet himself did not regard the work highly, and thought that, a few numbers apart, it deserved oblivion. Parisian critics of the day, attuned to the gentler sounds of Auber and Offenbach, complained about the heaviness of Bizet's orchestration, which they said was noisy, overloaded and Wagnerian—"a fortissimo in three acts". The conductor Hans von Bülow dismissed the work contemptuously as "a tragical operetta", and when it was revived after 1886, resented having to conduct it. Modern writers have generally treated the piece more generously; the music may be of uneven quality and over-reflective of the works of Bizet's contemporaries, says Dean, but there are interesting hints of his mature accomplishments. Others have given credit to the composer for overcoming the limitations of the libretto with some genuinely dramatic strokes and the occasional inspiring melody.

== Musical numbers ==
The listing is based on the 1977 EMI recording, which used the 1863 vocal score. In the post-1886 revisions the act 1 "Amitié sainte" duet was replaced with a reprise of "Au fond du temple saint". In act 3 the sequence of numbers after the chorus "Dès que le soleil" was changed after 1886, together with cuts from and additions to the original. "O lumière sainte", was recomposed by Benjamin Godard as a trio for Nadir, Leila and Zurga.

Act 1

- "Sur la grève en feu" (Chorus)
- "Amis, interrompez vos danses et vos jeux!" (Zurga, Chorus)
- "Mais qui vient là...Des savanes et des forêts" (Zurga, Nadir, Chorus)
- "Demeure parmi nous, Nadir" (Zurga, Nadir, Chorus)
- "C'est toi, toi qu'enfin je revois!" (Zurga, Nadir)
- "Au fond du temple saint" (Nadir, Zurga)
- "Amitié sainte" (Zurga, Nadir)
- "Que vois-je...Une fille inconnue" (Zurga, Nadir)
- "C'est elle, c'est elle...Sois la bienvenue" (Chorus)
- "Seule au milieu de nous" (Zurga, Leila, Nadir, Chorus)
- "Qu'as-tu donc? Ta main frissonne et tremble" (Zurga, Leila, Nourabad, Chorus)
- "À cette voix...Je crois entendre encore" (Nadir)
- "Le ciel est bleu!" (Chorus, Nourabad, Nadir)
- "O Dieu Brahma!" (Leila, Nadir, Chorus)

Act 2

- "La lala la, la lala la...L'ombre descend des cieux" (Chorus, Nourabad, Leila)
- "Les barques ont gagné la grève...J'étais encore enfant" (Nourabad, Leila, Chorus)
- "Me voilà seule dans la nuit...Comme autrefois" (Leila)
- "De mon amie, fleur endormie" (Nadir, Leila)
- "Léïla! Léïla!...Dieu puissant, le voilà!" (Nadir, Leila)
- "Ton coeur n'a pas compris le mien" (Nadir, Leila)
- "Ah! revenez à la raison!" (Leila, Nadir, Nourabad, Chorus)
- "Dans cet asile sacré, dans ces lieux redoutables" (Nourabad, Leila, Nadir, Chorus)
- "Arrêtez! arrêtez!" (Zurga, Nourabad, Leila, Nadir, Chorus)
- "Brahma! divin Brahma!" (Chorus)

Act 3

- "L'orage s'est calmé...O Nadir, tendre ami de mon jeune âge" (Zurga)
- "Qu'ai-je vu? O ciel, quel trouble...Je frémis" (Zurga, Leila)
- "Quoi! Innocent? Lui, Nadir?" (Zurga, Leila)
- "Je suis jaloux" (Zurga, Leila)
- "Entends au loin ce bruit de fête" (Nourabad, Leila, Zurga)
- "Dès que le soleil" (Chorus)
- "Hélas! Qu'ont-ils fait de Léïla?" (Nadir, Nourabad, Chorus)
- "Ah, Léïla!...O lumière sainte" (Nadir, Leila, Nourabad, Chorus)
- "Le jour enfin perce la nue!" (Nourabad, Zurga, Nadir, Leila, Chorus)
- "Plus de crainte...Rêves d'amour, adieu!" (Leila, Nadir, Zurga)

== Editions ==
Having completed the score of Les pêcheurs in August 1863, Bizet fell out with his publisher, Choudens, over publication rights. The quarrel was patched up and Choudens retained the rights, but published only a piano vocal score in 1863. After Bizet's death in 1875 his widow Geneviève Bizet showed scant care for her husband's musical legacy; several of his autograph scores, including that of Les pêcheurs de perles, were lost or given away. Choudens published a second piano vocal score in 1887–88 and a "nouvelle édition" in 1893 that incorporated the changes that had been introduced into recent revivals of the opera. A full orchestral score based on the nouvelle edition was published in 1893.

A trend towards greater authenticity began after Hammond's orchestrations in the 1970s provided a basis for staging the work in its original form. This process was further aided by the discovery in the 1990s of Bizet's 1863 conducting score. In this, the orchestral parts were reduced to six staves, but notes and other markings in the manuscript provided additional clues to the original orchestration. These new finds became the basis for Brad Cohen's critical edition of the score, published by Edition Peters in 2002.

== Recordings ==
The first complete recordings of the opera were issued in the early 1950s. Before then, numerous recordings of individual numbers had been issued; the duet "Au fond du temple saint", sung in Italian by Caruso and Mario Ancona, was recorded as early as 1907. The 1919 edition of The Victrola Book of the Opera lists available recordings of several of the solo numbers, the duet, the orchestral prelude, the chorus "Brahma! divin Brahma!" and the act 3 finale, mainly sung in Italian. The 1977 Prétre recording of the complete opera was the first to be based on the 1863 original as represented in Bizet's vocal score. The Plasson version of 1989, while using the 1863 score, gives listeners two versions of the duet: the curtailed form in which it appeared in Bizet's original, and the extended version in which it became more popularly known. Brad Cohen's highlights version, sung in English and based on the conductor's adaptation of Bizet's conducting score, also provides both versions of the duet. (Note: The Pink Floyd guitarist and vocalist David Gilmour performed the aria "Je crois entendre encore" during his solo concerts in 2001 and 2002. This version has been published on the DVD David Gilmour in Concert (2002), filmed at the 2001 Meltdown festival at the Royal Festival Hall in London.)

Recordings: year, cast, conductor, opera house and orchestra, record label and catalog number
Year	Cast (Leïla, Nadir, Zurga, Nourabad)	Conductor, opera house and orchestra	Label
1950	Rita Streich, Jean Löhe, Dietrich Fischer-Dieskau, Wilhelm Lang	Artur Rother; RIAS-Symphonie-Orchester and RIAS Kammerchor, Berlin (sung in German)	CD: Walhall; Cat: WLCD 0179
1950	Nadezda Kazantseva; Sergei Lemeshev; Vladimir Zakharov; Trofim Antonenko	Onissim Bron; Moscow Radio Symphony Orchestra and Chorus (sung in Russian)	CD: Gala; Cat: GL 100764
1951	Mattiwilda Dobbs; Enzo Seri; Jean Borthayre; Lucien Mans	René Leibowitz; Orchestre et Choeur Philharmonique de Paris	CD: Nixa; Cat: PR 20010
1953	Pierrette Alarie; Léopold Simoneau; René Bianco; Xavier Depraz	Jean Fournet; Orchestre des concerts Lamoureux and Chorale Élisabeth Brasseur	CD: Philips; Cat: OPD 1423
1954	Martha Angelici; Henri Legay; Michel Dens; Louis Noguéra	André Cluytens; L'Opéra-Comique de Paris	CD: EMI Classics; Cat: B000005GR8
1959	Marcella Pobbe; Ferruccio Tagliavini; Ugo Savarese; Carlo Cava	Oliviero De Fabritiis; Teatro di San Carlo di Napoli (recording of a performance in the Teatro di San Carlo, Naples. Sung in Italian)	CD: Walhall; Cat: WLCD 0299
1959	Janine Micheau; Alain Vanzo; Gabriel Bacquier; Lucien Lovano	Manuel Rosenthal; Orchestre Radio-Lyrique and Choeurs de la Radio Télévision Française	CD: Gala; Cat: GL 100504
1960	Janine Micheau; Nicolai Gedda; Ernest Blanc; Jacques Mars	Pierre Dervaux; Orchestra and Chorus of L'Opéra-Comique	CD: EMI; Cat: CMS 5 66020-2
1977	Ileana Cotrubaș; Alain Vanzo; Guillermo Sarabia; Roger Soyer	Georges Prêtre, Paris Opera Orchestra and Chorus	CD: EMI; Cat: 3677022
1989	Barbara Hendricks; John Aler; Gino Quilico; Jean-Philippe Courtis	Michel Plasson, Orchestra and Chorus of Capitole de Toulouse	CD: Angel; Cat: CDCB-49837
1991	Alessandra Ruffini; Giuseppe Morino; Bruno Praticò; Eduardo Abumradi	Carlos Piantini, Orchestra Internazionale d'Italia	CD: Nuova Era; Cat: 6944-6945
2004	Annick Massis; Yasu Nakajima; Luca Grassi; Luigi De Donato	Marcello Viotti; Orchestra and Chorus of La Fenice; Pier Luigi Pizzi, Tiziano Mancini (production); Audio and video recordings of a performance (or of performances) in the Teatro Malibran, Venice, April.	DVD Dynamic 2014
2008	Rebecca Evans; Barry Banks; Simon Keenlyside; Alastair Miles	Brad Cohen; London Philharmonic Orchestra, Geoffrey Mitchell Singers (abridged, sung in English)	CD: Chandos; Cat: CHAN3156
2012	Desirée Rancatore; Celso Albelo; Luca Grassi; Alastair Miles	Daniel Oren; Orchestra Filarmonica Salernitana "Giuseppe Verdi", Coro del Teatro dell'Opera di Salerno	CD: Brilliant Classics
2014	Patrizia Ciofi; Dmitry Korchak; Dario Solari; Roberto Tagliavini	Gabriele Ferro; Orchestra, Coro e Corpo di Ballo del Teatro di San Carlo; Fabio Sparvoli (production)	DVD & Blu-ray: Unitel Classica
2016	Diana Damrau; Matthew Polenzani; Mariusz Kwiecień; Nicolas Testé	Gianandrea Noseda; The Metropolitan Opera Orchestra & Chorus; Penny Woolcock (production)	HD video: Met Opera on Demand; Warner Classics Erato Blu-ray
2018	Julie Fuchs; Cyrille Dubois; Florian Sempey; Luc Bertin-Hugault	Alexandre Bloch; Les cris de Paris, Orchestre national de Lille (Diapason d'Or – Choc Classica)	SACD Pentatone

== Notes and references ==
Notes

Citations

Sources

- Britten, Benjamin; Mitchell, Donald; Read, Phillip (2004). Letters from a Life: The Selected Letters and Diaries of Benjamin Britten. Vol. 3. Berkeley and Los Angeles: University of California Press. ISBN 978-0-520-24259-3.
- Curtiss, Mina (1959). Bizet and his World. London: Secker & Warburg. OCLC 505162968.
- Dean, Winton (1965). Georges Bizet: His Life and Work. London: J.M. Dent & Sons Ltd. OCLC 643867230.
- Dean, Winton (1980). "Bizet, Georges (Alexandre César Léopold)". In Sadie, Stanley (ed.). The New Grove Dictionary of Music and Musicians. Vol. 2. London: Macmillan. ISBN 978-0-333-23111-1.
- Gilbert, Susie (2009). Opera for Everybody. London: Faber and Faber. ISBN 978-0-571-22493-7.
- Lacombe, Hervé (2001). The Keys to French Opera in the Nineteenth Century. Berkeley: University of California Press. p. 132. ISBN 978-0-520-21719-5 – via Internet Archive. "comme autrefois dans la nuit sombre."
- Greenfield, Edward; March, Ivan; Layton, Robert, eds. (1993). The Penguin Guide to Opera on Compact Discs. London: Penguin Books. ISBN 978-0-14-046957-8 – via Internet Archive.
- Neef, Sigrid, ed. (2000). Opera: Composers, Works, Performers (English ed.). Cologne: Könemann. ISBN 978-3-8290-3571-2.
- Rous, Samuel Holland (1919). The Victrola Book of the Opera (5th revised ed.). Camden, New Jersey: Victor Talking Machine Company. OCLC 220121268.
- Steen, Michael (2003). The Life and Times of the Great Composers. London: Icon Books. ISBN 978-1-84046-679-9.
