= Janine Micheau =

French operatic soprano (1914–1976)

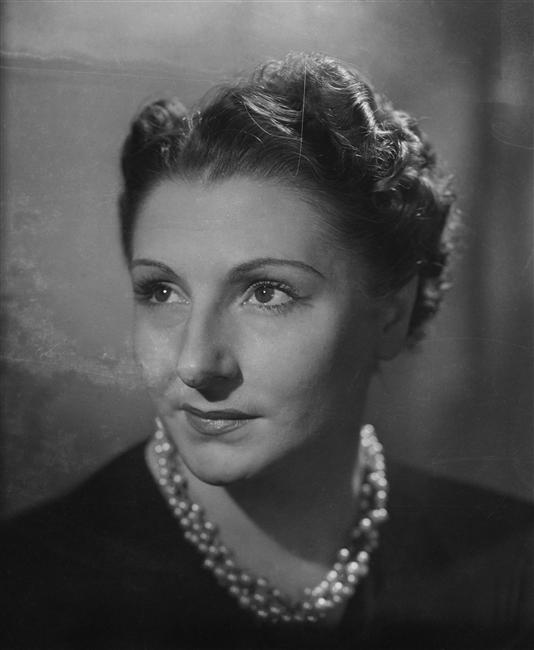
- Micheau in 1938
- Born: 17 April 1914; Toulouse, France
- Died: 18 October 1976 (aged 62); Paris, France
- Occupations: Operatic soprano; academic
- Years active: 1933–1968

Janine Micheau (17 April 1914 – 18 October 1976) was a French operatic soprano, one of the leading sopranos of her era in France, particularly associated with lyric soprano and coloratura soprano repertory.

== Biography ==
Janine (or Jeanine) Micheau was born in Toulouse, and studied voice at the Conservatoire de Paris. She made her professional debut at the Opéra-Comique on 16 November 1933, as la Plieuse in Louise, following this with Loys in Juif polonais by Camille Erlanger, the neighbour in Angélique by Jacques Ibert and small roles in Lakmé (Miss Rose) and Mireille (Andreloun).

She later sang Cherubino in Le nozze di Figaro, Olympia in Les contes d'Hoffmann, Rosina in Il barbiere di Siviglia, Leila in Les pêcheurs de perles, Micaëla in Carmen, and the title role in Lakmé at the Salle Favart. By 1935 her performances gained her invitations to Marseille (Lakmé), and then (at the instigation of Pierre Monteux) to Amsterdam (Mélisande) and San Francisco. In Buenos Aires Erich Kleiber conducted her in Sophie in Der Rosenkavalier.

She created the role of Creuse in Darius Milhaud's Médée, for her debut at the Paris Opéra in 1940, also singing in the premiere of his Bolivar (Manuela) in 1950, where she also sang Gilda in Rigoletto, Violetta in La traviata and Sophie in Der Rosenkavalier, among other roles.

Once the war was over, her career became more international than it had been; she performed at La Scala in Milan, La Monnaie in Brussels, and the Royal Opera House in London. At these venues she sang nearly all the great French soprano roles: including Marguerite, Juliette in the Gounod opera, Massenet's Manon, and Mélisande in Pelléas. For French Radio she sang in Isoline (1947) and Madame Chrysanthème (1956), by André Messager.

Micheau was also active in concert especially in 18th century French works such as Rameau's Les Indes galantes and Platée. She made many recordings, of which some have been released on CDs. Concert works in her repertoire included Shéhérazade by Ravel, Le martyre de Saint Sébastien and La Damoiselle élue by Debussy, songs by Milhaud and Debussy, and À la musique by Chabrier (which she also recorded).

From 1961 she became a voice teacher at the Paris Conservatoire, and the Mozarteum in Salzburg. Her final performance was as Pamina in Rouen in May 1968. She died in Paris at the age of 62.

== Selected recordings ==
- 1951 – Bizet – Carmen (Micaëla), with Suzanne Juyol, Libero de Luca, Julien Giovannetti – Choeur et orchestre de l'Opéra-Comique, Albert Wolff – Decca
- 1951 – Massenet – Manon (title role), with de Luca, Roger Bourdin, Giovanetti – Choeur et Orchestre de l'Opéra-Comique, Albert Wolff – Decca
- 1951 – Honegger – Le Roi David, with Pierre Mollet, Maurice Duruflé, Chorale Elizabeth Brasseur, Orchestre National de la Radiodiffusion Française, the composer – Ducretet Thomson
- 1952 – Debussy – La Damoiselle élue (the damozel) and Chabrier – À la musique and Sextuor and Chanson Tzigane from Le Roi malgré lui (Minka), with Orchestre des Concerts du Conservatoire de Paris, Jean Fournet - Decca
- 1953 – Thomas – Mignon (Philine), with Geneviève Moizan, de Luca, René Bianco – Choeur et Orchestre Nationale de Belgique, Georges Sébastian – Decca
- 1953 – Gounod – Roméo et Juliette (Juliette), with Raoul Jobin, Heinz Rehfuss – Paris Opera Chorus and Orchestra, Alberto Erede – Decca
- 1953 – Debussy – Pelléas et Mélisande (Mélisande), with Camille Maurane, Michel Roux – Chorale Elisabeth Brasseur, Orchestre Lamoureux, Jean Fournet – Philips
- 1955 – Stravinsky – Le Rossignol (title role), with Lucien Lovano, Jean Giraudeau, Roux, Bernard Cottret – Choeur et Orchestre de la Radiodiffusion Francaise, André Cluytens – EMI
- 1955 – Gluck – Orphée et Eurydice (Eurydice), with Nicolai Gedda, Liliane Berton – Choeur et Orchestre des Concerts du Conservatoire de Paris, Louis de Froment – EMI
- 1956 – Britten Les Illuminations and Ravel Shéhérazade – Orchestre Lamoureux, Paul Sacher – Philips
- 1956 – Rameau – Platée (La Folie), with Michel Sénéchal, Gedda, Jacques Jansen – Choeurs du Festival d'Aix en Provence, Orchestre de la Société des Concerts du Conservatoire, Hans Rosbaud – EMI
- 1956 – Rousseau – Le Devin du Village, Janine Micheau (Colette) with Nicolai Gedda, (Colin) Michel Roux (Le Devin) – Orchestre De Chambre Louis de Froment, Choeurs Raymond Saint-Paul, Columbia 33CX 1503
- 1956 – Milhaud – vocal works : Cantate nuptiale, from Song of Songs; Chansons de Ronsard; Les Quatre Eléments; excerpts from Bolivar; Fontaines et Sources – Orchestre de la Société des Concerts du Conservatoire, the composer - Columbia
- 1957 – Lalo – Le roi d'Ys (Rozenn), with Rita Gorr, Henri Legay, Jean Borthayre – Choeur et Orchestre de la Radiodiffusion Francaise, André Cluytens – EMI
- 1958 – Debussy mélodies, with Aldo Ciccolini – Columbia
- 1958 – Van Parys & Parès – Le Moulin sans souci (Johann/Johanna), with Berton, Dens – Choeur et Orchestre de l'Assocation des Concerts Colonne, Paul Bonneau – EMI
- 1959 – Bizet – Carmen (Micaëla), with Victoria de los Angeles, Gedda, Ernest Blanc – Choeur et Orchestre de la RTF, Thomas Beecham – EMI
- 1960 – Bizet – Les pêcheurs de perles (Leïla), with Gedda, Blanc, Jacques Mars – Choeur et Orchestre de l'Opéra-Comique, Pierre Dervaux – EMI

On the lighter side, in 1958 Micheau recorded an LP with Paul Bonneau conducting the Chœurs Raymond Saint-Paul and orchestra, including "Fascination", "Oh! La troublante volupté" from La Reine s'amuse (1912) by Charles Cuvillier, Les chemins de l'amour, Les cent vierges (Charles Lecocq), "Moulin rouge", Valse des souvenirs by Wal-Berg, and Messager's "Si j'avais vos ailes", among others.

== Sources ==
- Dictionnaire des interprètes, Alain Pâris, (Robert Laffont, 1982), ISBN 2-221-06660-X
- Guide de l’opéra, Mancini & Rouveroux, (Fayard, 1995). ISBN 2-213-59567-4
