= À la musique =

Vocal work by Emmanuel Chabrier

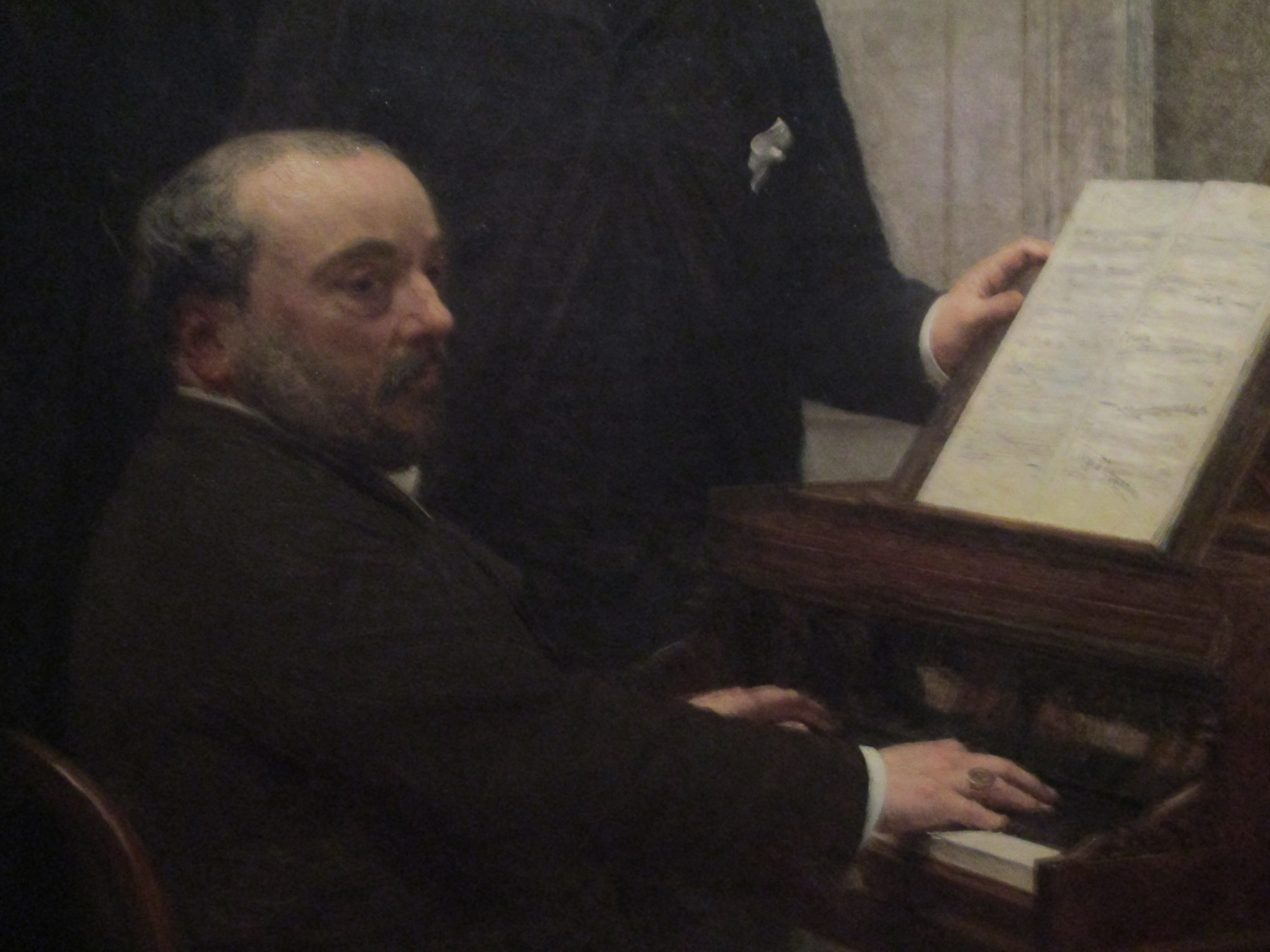
Detail of Autour du piano by Henri Fantin-Latour (1885) showing Emmanuel Chabrier at the piano

À la musique is a vocal work by Emmanuel Chabrier for solo soprano, women’s chorus and orchestra (or piano). The words are by poet and playwright Edmond Rostand.

It was written as a 'house-warming' gift for Jules "Tergis" Griset, industrialist and keen cellist (member of the Geloso Quartet with Albert Géloso, Pierre Monteux and Bloch), to whom it is dedicated ('to inaugurate the house of a friend'). It was first performed in November 1890 at Griset's house (then Place de Laborde, now 12 Place Henri-Bergson, Paris) by the Société Chorale d'Amateurs Guillot de Sainbris with Chabrier at the piano.

The first public performance was on 23 March 1891 with Mme Rachel-Pascaline Leroux-Ribeyre and the Colonne Orchestra conducted by Édouard Colonne at the Théâtre du Châtelet. It was also performed at the Concerts du Conservatoire on the 22 and 29 January 1893 with Éléonore Blanc (who would create the role of Briséïs four years later) as soloist, conducted by Paul Taffanel. The orchestral manuscript is now in the Bibliothèque nationale de France.

The music (marked Andantino, molto con affetto) is in Chabrier's tenderest, most lyrical vein, entirely free from any suggestion of eccentricity or pseudo-Wagnerian grandiloquence. Myers points out bold touches, such as when the alto voices, over a pedal f# in the orchestra reiterate for four long 9/8 bars the words 'musique adorable' on the same note, while the soloist and other voices weave round them an expressive melodic figure starting on G natural. He adds "its limpid and mellifluous accents are completely innocent of any of those undercurrents of irony, bravura or humorous exaggeration which have come to be accepted as the hallmarks of his very idiosyncratic style".

À la musique was a favourite piece of Claude Debussy and was chosen by Désiré-Émile Inghelbrecht to open the concert he conducted to inaugurate the new Théâtre des Champs-Élysées on 2 April 1913. Present at the rehearsal for this concert, Debussy asked the conductor to play it again – just for the pleasure of hearing it.

À la musique is scored for an orchestra consisting of 2 flutes, 2 oboes, 2 B♭ clarinets, 2 bassoons; 4 horns in F, 2 trumpets in F, 3 trombones; timpani, triangle; 2 harps, violins, violas, cellos and double basses.

Janine Micheau recorded the work for Decca with the Elisabeth Brasseur Chorale and Paris Conservatoire Orchestra conducted by Jean Fournet in June 1952 at the Maison de la Mutualité, Paris, produced by John Culshaw, and in 1991 Barbara Hendricks with the Toulouse Capitole Orchestra under Michel Plasson for EMI. Geraldine McGreevy with Polyphony directed by Stephen Layton and Graham Johnson at the piano recorded it as part of Hyperion Records complete survey of Chabrier songs.
