= Libero de Luca =

Swiss opera singer (1913–1997)

Libero De Luca (13 March 1913 – 1998) was a Swiss tenor of Italian descent particularly associated with the French repertory.

== Life and career ==
De Luca was born in Kreuzlingen, Switzerland, and studied voice at the Zurich Conservatory with Alfredo Cairati. After winning a first prize at an international voice competition in Geneva, in 1941, he made his professional debut the following year at the Solothurn Municipal Theatre.

After one season at the Bern Municipal Theatre, he joined the Zurich Opera where he was first tenor from 1943 to 1949. During that period, he also appeared regularly to great acclaim at the Teatro San Carlo in Naples, the Royal Opera House in London, at La Monnaie in Brussels, and at the Teatro Colón in Buenos Aires.

In 1949, he made his debut at both the Opéra-Comique and the Palais Garnier, where he established himself as a lead tenor in the French repertoire.

Libero De Luca was fluent in German, French and Italian, and excelled in all three repertoires in lyric roles. He retired from the stage in 1961, and became a full-time voice teacher in Horn, Switzerland, near Lake Constance, where he died in 1998.

De Luca made several recordings, notably Mignon and Manon, opposite Janine Micheau, Lakmé, opposite Mado Robin, and Carmen, opposite Suzanne Juyol. There are also some operetta recordings on Polydor, conducted by Franz Marszalek.

== Sources ==
- Alain Pâris, Dictionnaire des interprètes, Éditions Robert Laffont, 1989. ISBN 2-221-06660-X
- Paul Gruber, The Metropolitan Opera Guide to Recorded Opera, W.W. Norton & Company, 1993. ISBN 0-393-03444-5
- Klaus Ulrich Spiegel: Gentilhomme d’opéra - Noblesse, Stilsicherheit, Phrasierungskunst: Der weltläufige Tenor Libero de Luca - HAfG 2011
