= Jean Fournet =

French flutist and conductor (1913–2008)

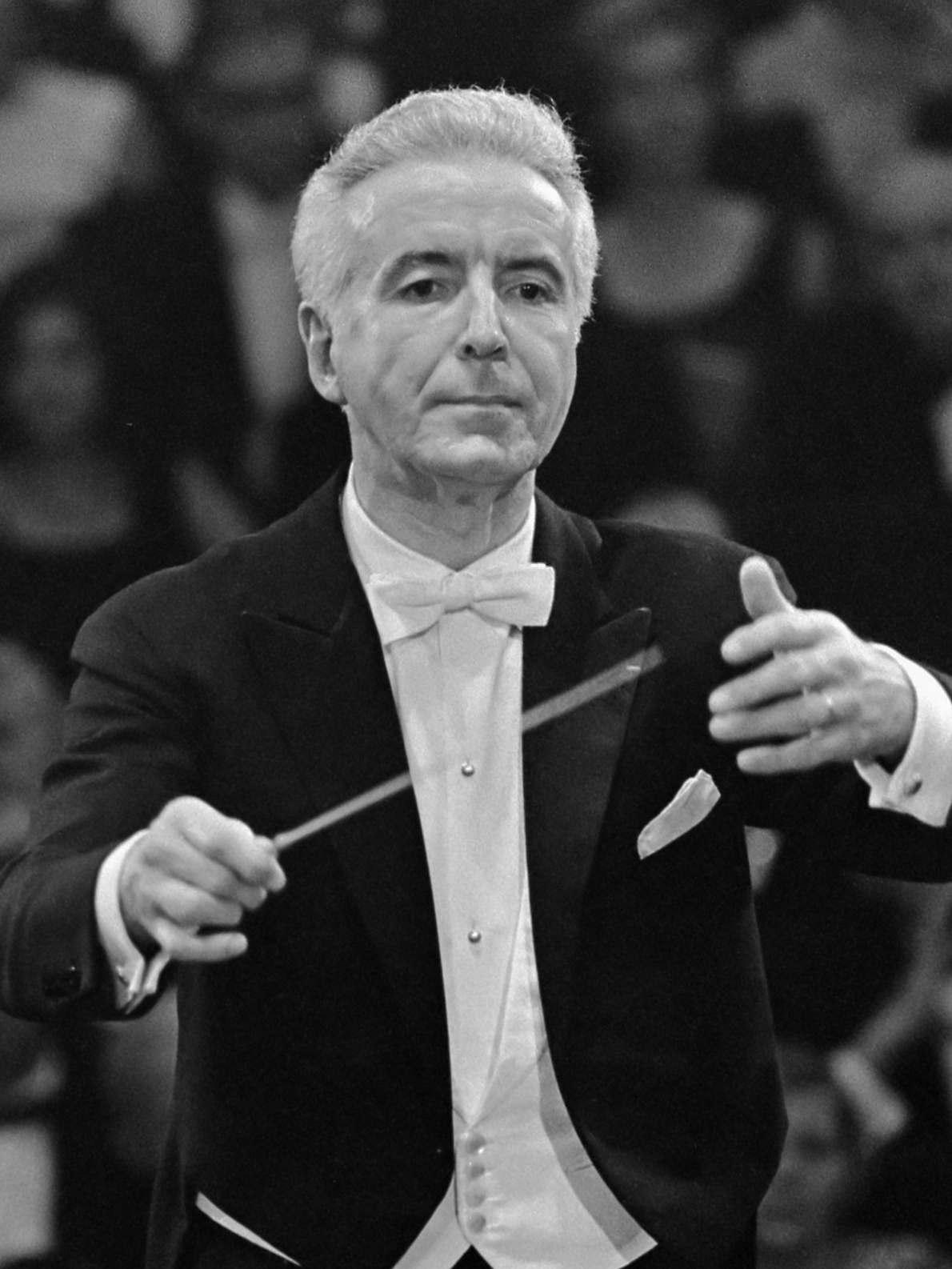
Jean Fournet in 1967

Jean Fournet (14 April 1913 – 3 November 2008) was a French flautist and conductor.

== Biography ==
Fournet was born in Rouen in 1913. His father was a flutist who gave him some instruction on the flute and music theory. Fournet was then trained at the Conservatoire de Paris in flute by Gaston Blanquart and Marcel Moyse, and conducting by Philippe Gaubert (himself a flutist). He performed on the flute at age fifteen with the Orchestra of the Théâtre des Arts in Rouen. He first established himself as a conductor in his native country conducting in Rouen 1936–1940, Marseille 1940–1944, and then as director of the Paris Opéra-Comique 1944–1957. He was also a professor of conducting at the École Normale de Musique de Paris 1944–1962. In 1949, and again in 1950, he was guest conductor with the Radio Éireann Symphony Orchestra. His debut with the Concertgebouw Orchestra was in 1950. The Netherlands became Fournet's second home. He became principal guest conductor of the Netherlands Radio Philharmonic Orchestra in Hilversum 1961–1968, where he also taught conducting. He married Miriam-Hannecart Jakes, an American who performed the Cor anglais with the Netherlands Radio Philharmonic Orchestra from 1977.

He served as music director of the Rotterdam Philharmonic Orchestra 1968–1973, and the Orchestre national d'Île de France from its conception in 1973 to 1982. He was the conductor of the Tokyo Metropolitan Symphony Orchestra 1983–1986 (he was given the title Honorary Conductor in 1989, and on his death in 2008 he was honored again with the title Permanent Honorary Conductor). His debut with the Lyric Opera of Chicago was in 1965 with a double bill of Carmina Burana and L'heure espagnole, and his debut with the Metropolitan Opera in New York was on 28 March 1987, when he conducted Samson et Dalila.

Fournet was also president of the jury of the Besançon International Conductor's Competition for many years.

He proved a welcome addition to opera companies in America, where the French style had become something of a lost art. Beyond stage work, he proved, both early and late, a persuasive interpreter of the French symphonic literature. He was known as a gentle perfectionist, rarely raising his voice in rehearsal. Jean Fournet's career extended over an extraordinarily long period. His final concert was conducted in January 2005, at age 91, with the Tokyo Metropolitan Symphony Orchestra. Following that concert he retired to his home in Weesp near Hilversum in the Netherlands, where he died in 2008, aged 95.

== Recordings ==
- Hector Berlioz: La damnation de Faust, Op. 24 - Chœurs Émile Passani et Grand Orchestre de Radio Paris et Fanfares, Mona Laurena, Georges Jouatte, Paul Cabanel, André Pactat - Columbia LFX 614-628 (78s), Columbia SL-110 (LPs) (1942)
- Hector Berlioz: Grande Messe des Morts, Op. 5 Choeurs Emile Passani and Orchestra, Georges Jouatte - Columbia LFX 659-669 (78s), Columbia SL-159 (LPs) (1943)
- Gabriel Pierné : Saint François d'Assise, L'An mille, François Giraudeau ( François), Lucien Lovano (Le Lépreux), Berthe Monnart (Claire), Freda Betti (Lucia), Raymond Amade, ténor, Bernard Demigny (Léon)/a, baryton/b, Choeurs de La RTF, Orchestre radio-symphonique de Paris, René Alix/a, Orchestre National de La RTF/b, conducted by Jean Fournet. 2 CD Solstice 2021 (recording a 1953, b 1964)
- Claude Debussy: Pelleas et Melisande recorded with Orchestre Lamoureux, Janine Micheau, Rita Gorr, Camille Maurane, Michel Roux, Xavier Depraz 9/1953 2 CD Philips
- Georges Bizet: Les pêcheurs de perles recorded with Lamoureux Concert Association Orchestra, Pierrette Alarie, Léopold Simoneau, René Bianco, Xavier Depraz 10/1953 2 CD Philips
- Ernest Chausson: Symphony in B-flat Major, Op. 20; Gabriel Fauré: Pelléas et Mélisande, Op. 80 recorded with The Netherlands Radio Philharmonic (Jean Fournet)
- Camille Saint-Saëns, Piano Concerto n°5, Magda Tagliaferro, piano, Orchestre Lamoureux, conducted by Jean Fournet. Recorded 1954. 3 CD APR 2021. Diapason d’or
- Édouard Lalo, Symphonie espagnole, Ernest Chausson, Poème, Maurice Ravel, Tzigane, Arthur Grumiaux, violin, Orchestre des Concerts Lamoureux, conductor Jean Fournet. LP Philips 1954 & 1956.
- Camille Saint-Saëns, Violin concerto n°3, Henri Vieutemps, Violin concerto n°5, Arthur Grumiaux, violin, Orchestre des Concerts Lamoureux, conducted by Manuel Rosenthal. LP Philipps 1964.
- Camille Saint-Saëns, Violin concerto n°3, Arthur Grumiaux, violin, Orchestre des Concerts Lamoueux, conducted by Jean Fournet. LP Philipps 1956. SACD Praga réminiscences PRD/DSD 350077 (2013). Diapason d'or
- Paul Dukas: Orchestral Music: The Sorcerer's Apprentice, Fanfare for La Peri, La Péri, Symphony in C recorded with The Netherlands Radio Philharmonic (Jean Fournet)
- César Franck; Claude Debussy; Manuel de Falla: various works recorded with Czech Philharmonic, 1965 - 1967 Supraphon SU 4122-2 (2013)
- Arthur Honegger: Pacific 231, Rugby, Pastorale d'été recorded with The Netherlands Radio Philharmonic (Jean Fournet)
- Camille Saint-Saëns: Samson et Dalila recorded with The Netherlands Radio Philharmonic (Jean Fournet, Jon Vickers, Oralia Dominguez, Ernest Blanc). 2 CD Opera d'oro 1964
- Jean Sibelius: Violin Concerto, Op. 47 recorded with Guila Bustabo and The Orchestra della Svizzera Italiana (Jean Fournet), 1965 issued on Melo Classic MC 2029
- French Orchestral Favorites: Claude Debussy: Prelude to the Afternoon of a Faun; Maurice Ravel: La Valse; Jacques Ibert: Escales; Georges Bizet: L'Arlesienne Suites (excerpts) recorded with Tokyo Metropolitan Symphony Orchestra (Jean Fournet)
- Hector Berlioz, La Mort d’Orphée (Monologue et Bacchanale), Scène Héroïque (La Révolution grecque), Le Cinq Mai (Chant sur la mort de l’Empereur Napoléon), L’Impériale (Cantate pour 2 chœurs). Dutch Radio Choir & Radio Symphony Orchestra, Gérard Garino, ténor, Rudd Van der Meer, basse, Lieuwe Visser, basse, conducted by Jean Fournet - CD Denon 1988 (concert live, 18/01/1987).

Cultural offices
Preceded by Franz Paul Decker	Music Directors, Rotterdam Philharmonic Orchestra; 1968–1973	Succeeded by Edo de Waart
