= Manon =

1884 opera by Jules Massenet

- Opera by Jules Massenet
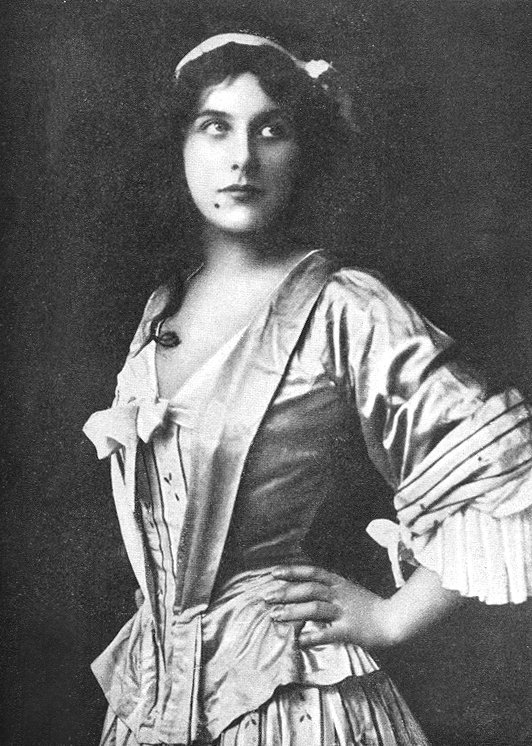
- Geraldine Farrar in the title role
- Librettist: Henri Meilhac; Philippe Gille
- Language: French
- Based on: Manon Lescaut by Abbé Prévost
- Premiere: 19 January 1884; Opéra-Comique, Paris

Manon (French pronunciation: [manɔ̃]) is an opéra comique in five acts by Jules Massenet to a French libretto by Henri Meilhac and Philippe Gille, based on the 1731 novel L'histoire du chevalier des Grieux et de Manon Lescaut by the Abbé Prévost. It was first performed at the Opéra-Comique in Paris on 19 January 1884, with sets designed by Eugène Carpezat (act 1), Auguste Alfred Rubé and Philippe Chaperon (acts 2 and 3), and Jean-Baptiste Lavastre (act 4).

Prior to Massenet's work, Halévy (Manon Lescaut, ballet, 1830) and Auber (Manon Lescaut, opéra comique, 1856) had used the subject for musical stage works. Massenet also wrote a one-act sequel to Manon, Le portrait de Manon (1894), involving the Chevalier des Grieux as an older man.

Manon is considered Massenet's most popular and enduring opera. It has maintained an important place in the repertory since its creation. It is considered the quintessential example of the charm and vitality of the music and culture of the Parisian Belle Époque. In 1893 an opera by Giacomo Puccini entitled Manon Lescaut, and based on the same novel was premiered and has also become popular.

== Background ==
The first theatrical adaptation of Manon Lescaut was in 1772, a comedy entitled The Virtuous Courtesan (French: La Courtisane vertueuse). The first operatic adaptation, in 1836, was not a success, but after 1853, six operas based on Manon Lescaut were produced. Auber's opéra-comique version Manon Lescaut of 1856 was the first in the genre with a tragic death, foreshadowing Carmen.

According to chapter XV of Massenet's Souvenirs, visiting the librettist Henri Meilhac at his house at 30 rue Druout in the autumn of 1881, sitting in the library full of rare and valuable books, while Meilhac was writing Massenet spotted a book in the library and exclaimed "Manon", pointing to it «...Manon, m'ecrai-je, en montrant du doigt le livre à Meilhac.» Meilhac replied "you want Manon Lescaut" to which Massenet responded "No, Manon, just Manon" « Non, Manon, Manon tout court... » Early drafts came within a few days. The composer worked at the score of Manon at his country home outside Paris and also at a house at The Hague once occupied by Prévost himself. During 1882, Massenet worked closely with the two librettists Gille and Meilhac, and finished the piano score in the latter part of the year, with orchestration complete by the summer of 1883.

== Performance history ==
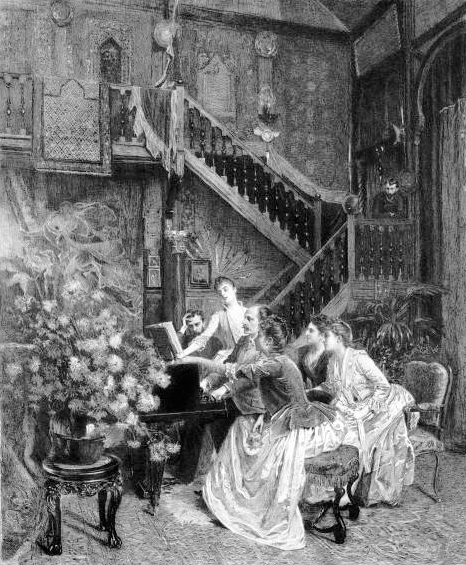
"Gathering around a score" by Charles Baude (1853–1935) shows Massenet rehearsing Manon with Sibyl Sanderson in Pierre Loti's drawing room. It was used as the cover of Le Théâtre in July 1889.

The opera was a mainstay of the Opéra-Comique in Paris, reaching its 1,000th performance there in 1919, its 1,500th in 1931 and 2,000th in 1952.

The first Manon was Marie Heilbron; some of the most celebrated interpreters include Sibyl Sanderson (Massenet's personal favorite), Nellie Melba, Geraldine Farrar, Fanny Heldy, Lucrezia Bori, Amelita Galli-Curci, Bidu Sayão, Victoria de los Ángeles, Anna Moffo, Beverly Sills, Renée Fleming, Anna Netrebko, and Lisette Oropesa. Due to its heavy vocal demands, the role of Manon was described by Sills as "the French Isolde". As for the part of Des Grieux, among the most famous interpreters are Edmond Clément, Jean de Reszke, Enrico Caruso, Beniamino Gigli, Tito Schipa, Ferruccio Tagliavini, Gaston Micheletti, Adolphe Maréchal, Charles Fontaine and Libero de Luca.

Within a year of its Paris premiere, Manon was given its UK premiere in January 1885, in Liverpool; in the US, the Academy of Music in New York presented the opera later the same year, on 23 December. At the Royal Opera House in London it was first presented 19 May 1891. The Metropolitan Opera gave its first staging on 16 January 1895, and Manon has subsequently often been performed there. Anna Netrebko starred in a new production directed by Laurent Pelly, a co-production with the Royal Opera House, which was simulcast in HD on 7 April 2012. The San Francisco Opera gave the opera many stagings beginning on 29 September 1924.

In the 1980s a piano score was discovered where spoken dialogue was set as recitative by Massenet, possibly for the Italian premiere; this version was performed at the Opéra de Saint-Etienne as part of the 2009 Massenet Festival.

Today, Manon is frequently performed.

The ballet L'histoire de Manon by Kenneth MacMillan, although entirely arranged from music written by Massenet, does not include any from Manon.

== Roles ==
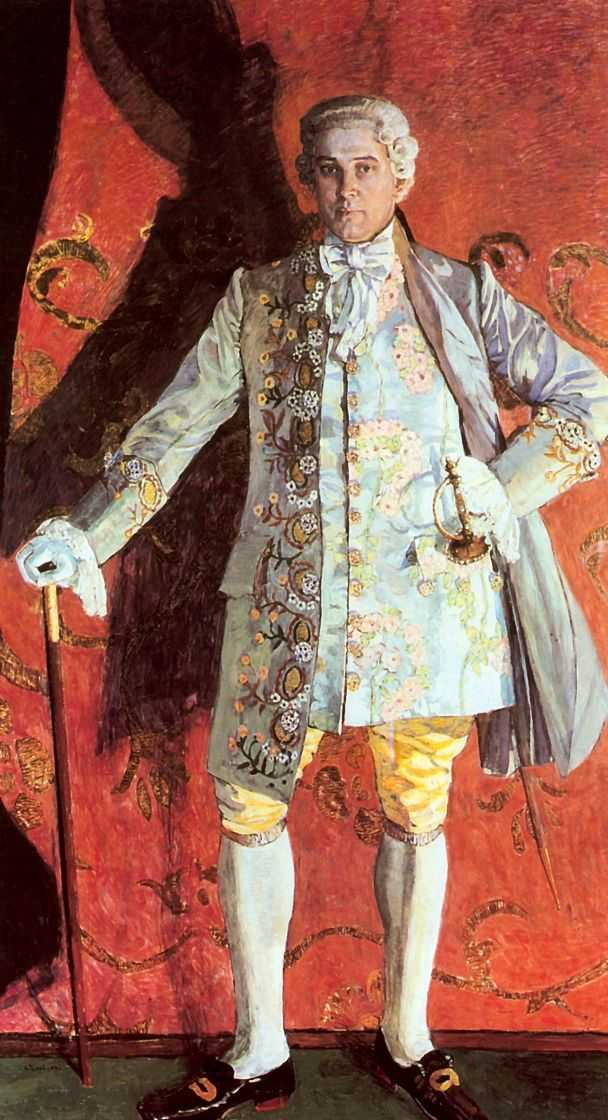
Dmitri Smirnov as Le Chevalier des Grieux (1909, by Aleksandr Golovin)

Roles, voie types, premiere cast
Role	Voice type	Premiere cast, 19 January 1884 Conductor: Jules Danbé
Manon Lescaut	soprano	Marie Heilbron
Le Chevalier des Grieux	tenor	Jean-Alexandre Talazac
Lescaut, Manon's cousin	baritone	Émile-Alexandre Taskin
Le Comte des Grieux, the Chevalier's father	bass	Cobalet
Guillot de Morfontaine	tenor	Pierre Grivot
Monsieur de Brétigny	baritone	Collin
Poussette, an actress	soprano	Zoé Molé-Truffier
Javotte, an actress	mezzo-soprano	Esther Chevalier
Rosette, an actress	mezzo-soprano	Remy
Innkeeper	bass	Labis
A porter	tenor	Legrand
A sergeant	baritone	Étienne Troy
Guardsmen, townsfolk, travellers, hawkers, congregation, gamblers, soldiers

== Synopsis ==
Place: France
Time: the reign of Louis XV

=== Act 1 ===
The courtyard of an inn at Amiens

De Brétigny, a nobleman, has just arrived, in the company of Guillot, an aging rake who is the Minister of Finance, along with three flirtatious young actresses. While the innkeeper is serving dinner to the party, the townspeople collect to witness the arrival of the coach from Arras. Among them is Lescaut, a guardsman, who tells his comrades that he plans to meet a kinswoman. The coach appears, and among the crowd Lescaut quickly identifies his fragile young cousin, Manon, who appears to be somewhat confused ("Je suis encor tout étourdie") since this is her first journey, one which is taking her to the convent.

Manon is accosted by the opportunistic Guillot, who tells her that he has a carriage waiting, in which they can leave together. His heavy-handed seduction is undermined by the return of Lescaut, who then lectures the young woman ("Regardez-moi bien dans les yeux") on proper behavior. He leaves her unattended once more and she admires the three fashionably-dressed actresses, but reproaches herself ("Voyons, Manon"), unconvincingly vowing to rid herself of all worldly visions.

Des Grieux, traveling home to see his father, catches sight of Manon, and instantly falls in love. When he approaches, she is charmed by his chivalrous address ("Et je sais votre nom"), and their exchange rapidly becomes a mutual avowal of love. Both their planned journeys, hers to the convent and des Grieux's to his home, are swiftly abandoned, as they decide to flee together ("Nous vivrons à Paris"). But there are hints of incompatible aspirations: while he returns, over and again, to "tous les deux" (together), the phrase she fondly repeats is, "à Paris". Making good use of the carriage provided by the disappointed Guillot, the lovers escape.

=== Act 2 ===
Manon and des Grieux's apartment in Paris

Manon! avez-vous peur...On l'appelle Manon
From act 2, performed by Enrico Caruso and Geraldine Farrar in 1912

With little hope, des Grieux writes to his father, imploring permission to marry Manon. Lescaut enters intent on creating a scene and accompanied by de Brétigny, who is masquerading as a fellow-guardsman. But his concern for offended family honor is only camouflage for his alliance with his friend. Trying to prove his honorable intentions, des Grieux shows Lescaut the letter to his father. Meanwhile, de Brétigny warns Manon that des Grieux is going to be abducted that evening, on the orders of his father, and offers her his protection and wealth, trying to persuade her to move on to a better future.

After the two visitors depart, Manon appears to vacillate between accepting de Brétigny's offer and warning des Grieux. When her lover goes out to post his letter, her farewell to the humble domesticity she has shared ("Adieu, notre petite table") makes clear she has decided to go with de Brétigny. Unaware of her change of heart, des Grieux returns and conveys his more modest vision of their future happiness ("En fermant les yeux", the "Dream Song"). Going outside to investigate an apparent disturbance, he is seized and hustled away, leaving Manon to voice her regrets.

=== Act 3 ===
Scene 1: Paris, the promenade of the Cours-la-Reine on a feast-day

Among the throng of holiday-makers and vendors of all kinds are Lescaut and Guillot, the latter still flirting with the young actresses, while Lescaut expresses the joys of gambling ("À quoi bon l'économie?"). De Brétigny arrives, soon joined by Manon, now sumptuously dressed and with a retinue of admirers. She sings about her new situation ("Je marche sur tous les chemins"), following it with a gavotte ("Obéissons quand leur voix appelle") on the joys of love and youth.

Des Grieux's father, the Comte, greets de Brétigny and Manon overhears that her former lover is Chevalier no longer, but Abbé, having entered the seminary of Saint-Sulpice. Approaching the Comte, Manon tries to discover whether his son still loves her. Guillot then attempts to win Manon over by bringing the ballet dancers of the Académie Royale de Musique, which she had expressed a desire to see. However Manon is seized by the desire to see des Grieux once more, and admits, to Guillot's annoyance when asked, that she paid no attention to the dancers. She hurries off to Saint-Sulpice.

Scene 2: Saint-Sulpice

Ah! fuyez, douce image (sung in Italian)
Recorded in 1910 by Aristodemo Giorgini for Edison Records

From the chapel, the congregation is leaving, enthusiastic over the sermon of the new abbé ("Quelle éloquence!"). Des Grieux enters, in clerical garb, and his father adds his voice to the chorus of praise, but tries to dissuade his son from this new life, so that he can perpetuate the family name ("Epouse quelque brave fille").

He leaves, having failed to shake his son's resolve and, alone, des Grieux relives memories of Manon ("Ah! Fuyez, douce image"). As he prays, Manon herself appears, to implore his forgiveness for her faithlessness. Furiously, he attempts to reject her, but when (in "N'est-ce plus ma main?") she recalls their past intimacies, his resistance is overcome, and their voices join in an impassioned avowal of love.

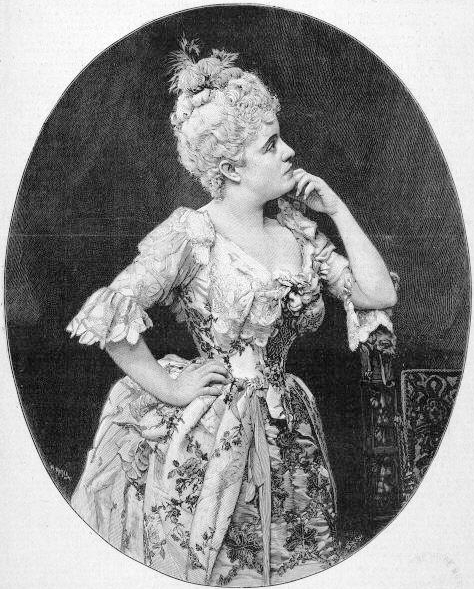
American soprano Sibyl Sanderson as Manon in 1888

=== Act 4 ===
A gaming salon at the Hôtel de Transylvanie

Lescaut and Guillot are among the gamblers, and the three young actresses are prepared to attach themselves to any winner. Manon arrives with des Grieux who declares his total love: ("Manon! Manon! Sphinx étonnant"). He is persuaded to gamble, in hopes of gaining the wealth she craves. He plays at cards with Guillot and continually wins, as Guillot doubles and redoubles the wager. As Manon exults, Guillot accuses des Grieux of cheating. Des Grieux denies the charge and Guillot leaves, returning shortly with the police, to whom he denounces des Grieux as a cheat and Manon as dissolute.

The elder des Grieux enters, and tells his son that, while he will intercede on his behalf, he will do nothing to save Manon. In a big ensemble, with Guillot exulting over his revenge, Manon lamenting the end of all joy, des Grieux swearing to defend her, and the rest expressing consternation and horror, the arrested pair are led away.

=== Act 5 ===
[Act 4, scene 2 in the original version]

A desolate spot near the road to Le Havre

Convicted as a woman of ill-fame, Manon has been condemned to be deported. Des Grieux, freed by his father's intervention, and a penitent Lescaut, now his ally, wait to waylay the convoy in which Manon is being marched to the port. A detachment of soldiers arrives with their prisoners. The would-be rescuers recognize the hopelessness of attacking so strong an escort, but Lescaut succeeds in bribing their sergeant to allow Manon to stay behind till evening. The convoy moves on, and a sick and exhausted Manon falls to the ground at des Grieux's feet.

In his arms, near delirium, she relives their former happiness. Des Grieux tells her the past can exist again but Manon, now calm, knows that it is too late. With the words "Et c'est là l'histoire de Manon Lescaut", she dies.

== Noted arias ==
- Act 1 – Manon: "Je suis encore tout étourdie" ("I am still completely dazed")
- Act 2 – des Grieux: "En fermant les yeux" ("Closing my eyes")
- Act 2 – Manon: "Adieu, notre petite table" ("Goodbye, our little table")
- Act 3 – Manon: "Obéissons quand leur voix appelle" ("Let us obey when their voice calls us")
- Act 3 – des Grieux: "Ah, fuyez douce image" ("Ah, flee, sweet image")
- Act 3 – des Grieux: "Je suis seule" ("I am alone")

== Recordings ==
Year	Cast: Manon, des Grieux, Lescaut, Comte des Grieux	Conductor, Opera house and orchestra	Label
1923	Fanny Heldy, Jean Marny, Léon Ponzio, Pierre Dupré	Henri Büsser; Orchestra and Chorus of the Opéra-Comique	CD: Malibran Music; Cat: MR 558; CD: Marston 52003-2
1928–29	Germaine Féraldy, Joseph Rogatchewsky, Georges Villier, Louis Guénot	Élie Cohen; Orchestra and Chorus of the Opéra-Comique	CD: Naxos «Historical» Cat: 8.110203-04
1937	Bidu Sayão, Sydney Rayner, Richard Bonelli, Chase Baromeo	Maurice Abravanel; Metropolitan Opera Orchestra	CD: Naxos «Historical» Cat: 8.110003-5
1951	Janine Micheau, Libero de Luca, Roger Bourdin, Julien Giovanetti	Albert Wolff; Orchestra and Chorus of the Opéra-Comique	CD: Preiser Records; Cat: 20013
1955	Victoria de los Ángeles, Henri Legay, Michel Dens, René Hérent; Jean Borthayre	Pierre Monteux; Orchestra and Chorus of the Opéra-Comique	CD: EMI; Cat: 63549; Naxos «Historical» Cat: 8.111268-70
1969	Mirella Freni, Luciano Pavarotti, Rolando Panerai, Antonio Zerbini	Peter Maag; Teatro alla Scala di Milano (live performance)	CD: Opera d'Oro; Cat: OPD-1270
1970	Beverly Sills, Nicolai Gedda, Gérard Souzay, Gabriel Bacquier	Julius Rudel; Ambrosian Opera Chorus; New Philharmonia Orchestra	CD: DG; Cat: 474 950-2
1982	Ileana Cotrubaș, Alfredo Kraus, Gino Quilico, José van Dam	Michel Plasson; Chorus and Orchestra of the Capitole de Toulouse	CD: Angel; Cat: 49610
1999	Angela Gheorghiu, Roberto Alagna, Earle Patriarco, José van Dam	Antonio Pappano; Chorus and Orchestra of the Théâtre Royal de la Monnaie	CD: EMI; Cat: 81842
2001	Renée Fleming, Marcelo Álvarez, Jean-Luc Chaignaud, Alain Vernhes	Jesús López Cobos; Chorus and Orchestra of the Paris Opera (Audio and video recordings of performances at the Opéra Bastille, June/July)	CD: Sony; S3K 90458; DVD (Video): TDK Mediactive; Cat: DVOPMANON
2007	Anna Netrebko, Rolando Villazón, Alfredo Daza, Christof Fischesser	Daniel Barenboim; Staatskapelle Berlin and Berlin State Opera Chorus	DVD: Deutsche Grammophon; Cat: 073 4431
2007	Natalie Dessay, Rolando Villazón, Manuel Lanza, Samuel Ramey	Víctor Pablo Pérez; Symphony Orchestra and Chorus of the Gran Teatre del Liceu, Barcelona	DVD: Virgin Classics; Cat: 5050689 7
