= Victor Serventi =

French composer

Victor Serventi (23 June 1907 – 16 March 2000) was a French composer.

== Life ==
Born in Algiers, Serventi studied at the Conservatoire de Paris from 1921; piano with Joseph Morpain then Lazare-Lévy, harmony with Jean Gallon, counterpoint and fugue with Noël Gallon and musical composition with Henri Busser. From 1934, he competed several times to the Prix de Rome where he won the first Grand Prix in 1937 with his cantata La Belle et la Bête.

From 1943 to 1977, he was professor at the Conservatoire de Paris. His compositions include Variations sur une complainte corse for piano in 1938, a piano suite in 1942 and variations for clarinet and piano. His most famous work, regularly given in concert and recorded several times, is the Largo et scherzando for double bass and piano which he composed in 1944.

Serventi was married to singer Suzanne Juyol (1920-1994). He died at Margency (Val-d'Oise) at the age of 92.
