= Marie Heilbron =

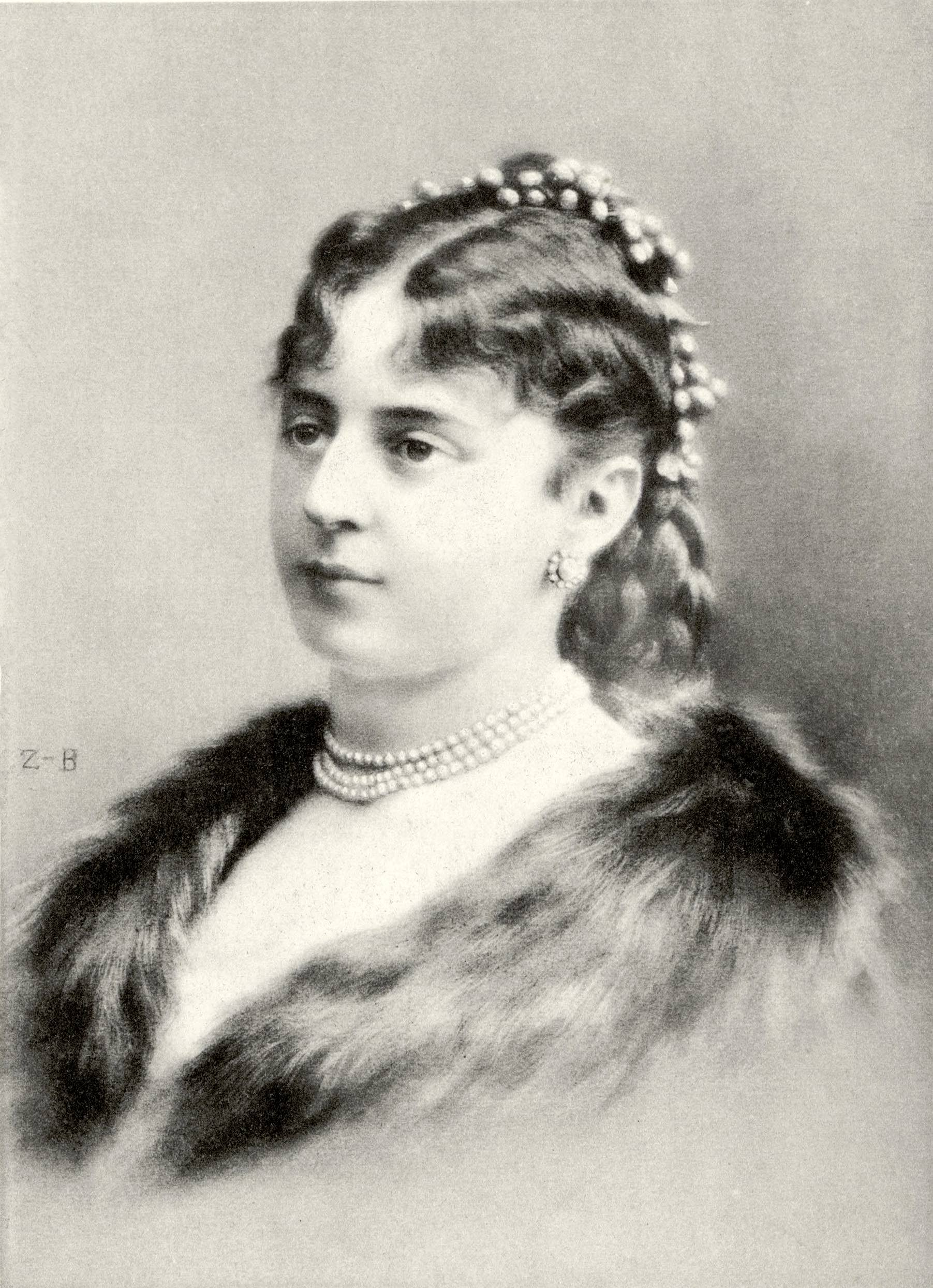
- Born: 5 May 1851; Antwerp, Belgium
- Died: 31 March 1886; Nice, France
- Occupation: singer

Marie Heilbron (or Heilbronn, 5 May 1851 - 31 March 1886) was a Belgian operatic lyric coloratura soprano, particularly associated with the French repertory, creator of Jules Massenet's quintessential French heroine Manon.

Born in Antwerp, she studied first in Brussels and later in Paris with famous tenor Gilbert Duprez. She made her Parisian debut at the Théâtre-Italien in 1866, as Marie in La fille du régiment. In 1867, she appeared for the first time at the Opéra-Comique, as Catherine in L'étoile du nord. She was to create there Massenet's Manon in 1884. She also appeared at the Théâtre des Variétés from 1871 onwards. She took part in the creation of Jacques Offenbach's Les braconniers, and Victor Massé's Une nuit de Cléopâtre.

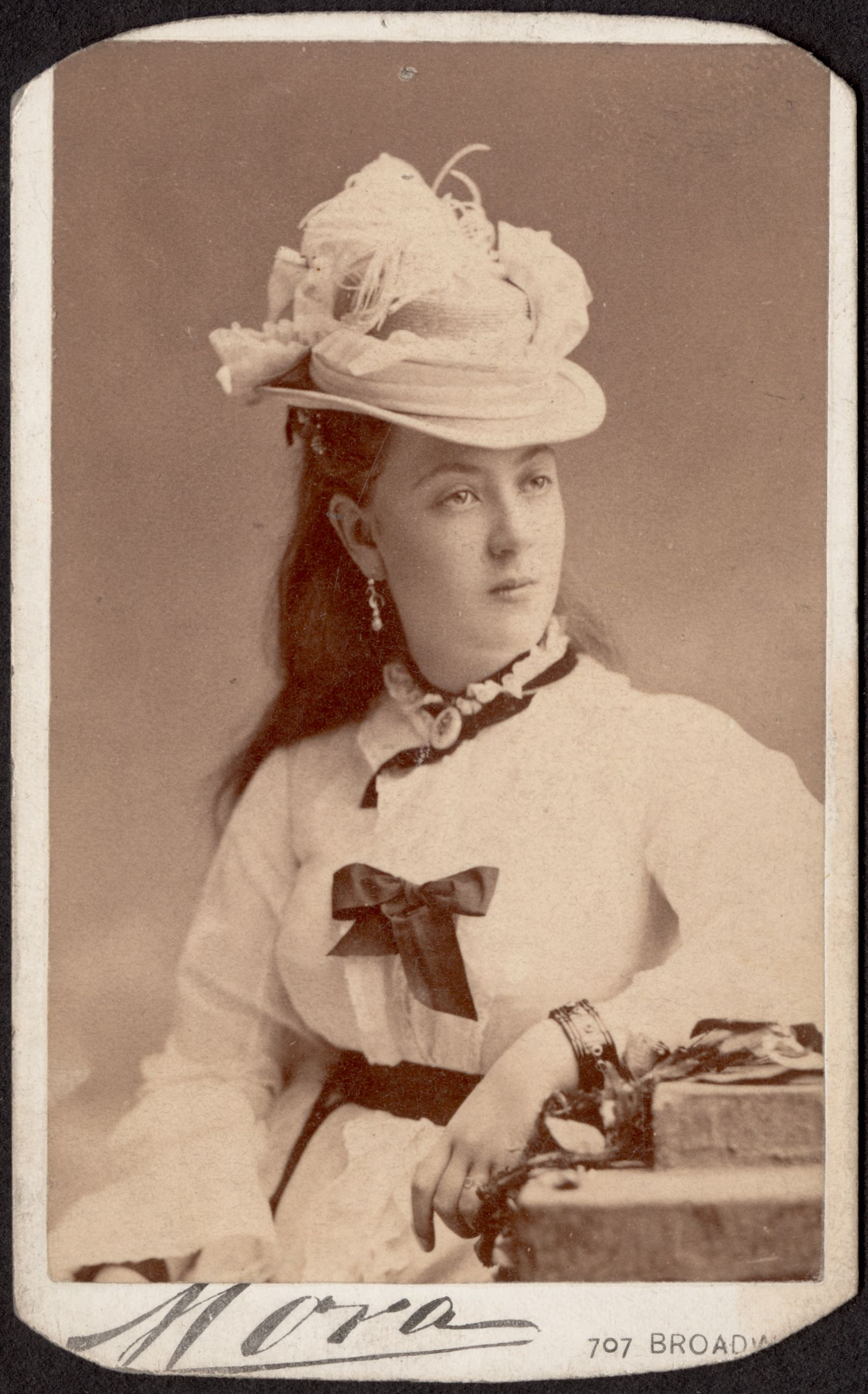
Marie Heilbron, ca. 1870-1886; from the Philip Hale Collection of the Boston Public Library

In 1879, she made her debut at the Opéra Garnier, where she sang as Marguerite in Faust, Ophélie in Hamlet, Juliette in Roméo et Juliette. The same year she made her debut at La Scala in Milan, as Violetta in La traviata. She also appeared in Monte Carlo and Saint Petersburg.

Heilbron died at Nice, France in 1886.

== Sources ==
- Le guide de l'opéra, Roland Mancini & Jean-Jacques Rouveroux, (Fayard, 1989) ISBN 2-213-01563-5
