= Suzanne Juyol =

French opera singer

Suzanne Juyol (1 January 1920 in Paris – 20 July 1994 in Paris) was a French opera singer, the leading dramatic soprano of her era in France.

Suzanne Juyol studied at the Conservatoire de Paris and made her professional debut at the Palais Garnier, in 1942, as Margared in Le roi d'Ys, followed by Fauré's Pénélope, Dukas's Ariadne, Marguerite in Berlioz's La damnation de Faust and in Gounod's Faust. Her debut at the Opéra-Comique took place in 1946, as Charlotte in Werther, other roles included: Carmen, Tosca, Santuzza in Cavalleria rusticana, etc.

She made her debut at the Monte Carlo Opera in 1947, where she began singing Wagnerian roles such as Kundry, the two Brunhildes and Ortrud. The success was such that she was invited to sing at the Berlin Staatsoper in Tristan und Isolde, opposite Max Lorenz, in 1951.

Just as an international career was in the making, Suzanne Juyol retired from the stage in 1960, aged only 40. She was married to Victor Serventi, a voice teacher at the Paris Opera.

== Selected recordings ==
- 1951 - Bizet - Carmen - Suzanne Juyol, Libero de Luca, Janine Micheau, Julien Giovannetti - Choeur et Orchestre de l'Opéra-Comique, Albert Wolff - DECCA
- 1953 - Massenet - Werther - Charles Richard, Suzanne Juyol, Agnes Léger, Roger Bourdin - Choeur et Orchestre de l'Opéra-Comique, Georges Sébastian - URANIA

== Sources ==
- Dictionnaire des interprètes, Alain Paris, (Robert Laffont, 1982). ISBN 2-221-06660-X
- Guide de l’opéra, Roland Mancini & Jean Rouveroux, (Fayard, 1995). ISBN 2-213-59567-4
