= Maria Teresa Leva =

Maria Teresa Leva (born 1987) is an Italian operatic soprano.

Leva was born in Reggio Calabria in 1987. She graduated with honors from the Musical Conservatory "Francesco Cilea" in her hometown.

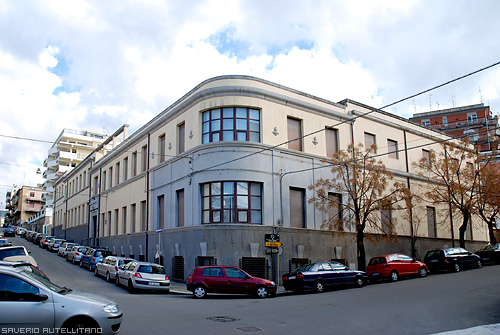
Musical Conservatory "Francesco Cilea" in Reggio Calabria

Reviewing her 2024 performance as Elena in Arrigo Boito's Mefistofele at the Teatro La Fenice, João Marcos Copertino writing for OperaWire called Leva, a "usually very interesting singer," with a voice "rich in vibrato," but said her performance "suffered a bit in shaping Elena's musical phrases," although "it might have been an opening night spell." Commenting on a 2026 appearance as Liù in Turandot at the Sydney Opera House, critic Helen Musa wrote that "Leva conveyed touching emotional nuance and actually made us care."

In January 2027, she is scheduled to perform the role of Mimi in La Bohéme in Sydney.
