= Jean Borthayre =

French operatic baritone

Jean Borthayre (25 May 1901, Musculdy – 25 April 1984, Montmorency) was a French operatic baritone, particularly associated with the French and Italian repertories.

== Career ==
Mainly self-taught, Borthayre began his career singing as a soloist in a Basque choir, touring Europe. In about 1936, he began studying voice with his wife Marie-Louise, daughter of bass Louis Azéma. He made his operatic debut in 1941, at the Capitole de Toulouse, as Hérode in Hérodiade, where he remained until 1945.

After the war, he began appearing at various opera houses throughout France, Bordeaux, Marseille, Strasbourg, etc. He made his debut at both the Paris Opéra and the Opéra-Comique in 1951, as Valentin in Faust, and Zurga in Les pêcheurs de perles, respectively. He was to sing at these two theatres until 1968.

Borthayre was largely based in France, singing little abroad, and became the epitome of the "French Style" of singing, meaning essentially impeccable diction and musical refinement. He also enjoyed considerable success in Verdi roles, such as Rigoletto, Germont, Renato, etc., which in his days were mainly sung in the national language in France.

Borthayre can be heard in a few complete opera recordings, notably; Les pêcheurs de perles, opposite Mattiwilda Dobbs, Lakmé, opposite Mado Robin, Faust and Manon, opposite Victoria de los Ángeles.

== Sources ==
- Le Guide de l'opéra, les indispensables de la musique, Roland Mancini & Jean-Jacques Rouvereux, (Fayard, 1986) ISBN 2-213-01563-5
