= Graciela Alperyn =

Argentine-German mezzo-soprano (born 1955)

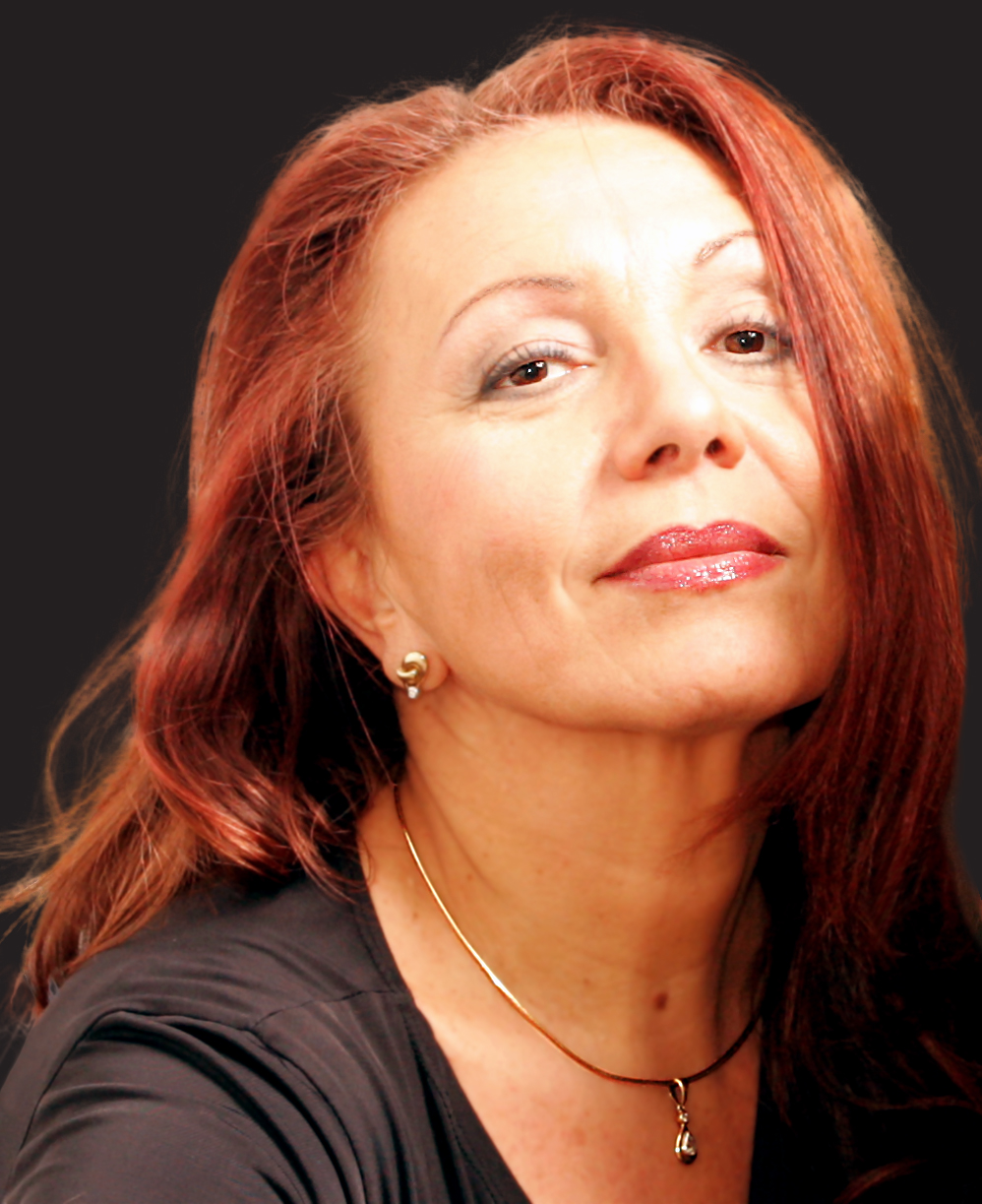
Graciela Alperyn

Graciela Alperyn (born 1955) is an Argentine-German operatic mezzo-soprano, who made an international career in opera, concert and recital. Her signature role is Bizet's Carmen.

== Biography ==
Alperyn was born in Buenos Aires. She was trained there in singing and acting by Susana Naidich and Leo Schwarz. She won several singing competitions and was a guest at the Teatro Colón early. She learned there a broad repertoire, and has remained appearing at the house in opera and concert.

Alperyn moved to Europe in 1985, and was engaged at the Musiktheater im Revier in Gelsenkirchen, appearing as a guest in Germany. She moved to the Hessisches Staatstheater Wiesbaden in 1986 where she remained until 1993. In 1994 she obtained German citizenship in Wiesbaden. Her roles there included Rosina in Rossini's Il Barbiere di Siviglia, Sextus in Mozart's La clemenza di Tito, the title role of Der Rosenkavalier and the Composer in Ariadne auf Naxos, Fricka in Wagner's Der Ring des Nibelungen, Charlotte in Massenet's Werther, the title role in Bizet's Carmen, Eboli in Verdi's Don Carlo and Santuzza in Mascagni's Cavalleria rusticana. At the Internationale Maifestspiele Wiesbaden she appeared as Delilah in Saint-Saëns' Samson and Delilah, and gave recitals, singing works by German, Italian, French, Spanish and Russian composers.

Alperyn appeared as Carmen alongside tenors such as Neil Shicoff, Francisco Araiza and Plácido Domingo, directed at the Zürich Opera House by Jean-Pierre Ponnelle and at the Bavarian State Opera by Lina Wertmüller.

Alperyn has recorded among others Carmen, Verdi's Requiem and Il trovatore. She recorded a solo album, Graciela Alperyn: ein Portrait. She has worked with conductors including James Conlon, Franz-Paul Decker, Rafael Frühbeck de Burgos, Marek Janowski, Siegfried Köhler, Uwe Mund, Garcia Navarro, Nello Santi, Ulf Schirmer and Hans Wallat.

== Recordings ==
- 1993 Carmen – Bizet (Naxos)
- 1996 Messa di Requiem – Verdi (Koch Disco)
- 1998 Graciela Alperyn ist die beste aller Carmen (Reader's Digest selection)
- 1999 Graciela Alperyn – Portrait (Arte Nova)
- 1999 Il Teatro Immaginario di Berlioz (Mondo Musica)
- 2000 Il trovatore – Verdi (Arte Nova)
