= Ernest Blanc =

French opera singer

- Ernest Blanc in Rigoletto (photo with dedication)
- Occupation: baritone opera singer

Ernest Blanc (November 1, 1923 – December 22, 2010) was a French opera singer, one of the leading baritones of his era in France.

Born in Sanary-sur-Mer, Ernest Blanc studied at the Music Conservatory of Toulon with Sabran, from 1946 to 1949. He made his debut in Marseille, as Tonio, in 1950. He then sang throughout France in the French and Italian repertories.

In 1954, he made his debut at the Palais Garnier in Paris, as Rigoletto, he sang there as first baritone for 25 years in a wide repertoire (Rameau, Mozart, Gounod, Bizet, Massenet, Verdi, Puccini, etc.). He also appeared often at the Opéra-Comique, and was a regular guest at the Aix-en-Provence Festival.

His career took an international turn in 1958, with debut at the Bayreuth Festival, followed by debuts at La Scala in Milan, the Royal Opera House in London, the Glyndebourne Festival, the Vienna State Opera, the Salzburg Festival, La Monnaie in Brussels, the Grand Théâtre de Genève, the Monte Carlo Opera, the Teatro Nacional Sao Carlos in Lisbon, the Liceo in Barcelona, the Berlin State Opera, etc.

He also enjoyed considerable success in America, at the Lyric Opera of Chicago, the San Francisco Opera, the Teatro Colón in Buenos Aires, etc.

Notable roles included; Don Giovanni, Valentin, Zurga, Escamillo, Golaud, Germont, Renato, Amonasro, Scarpia, Riccardo in I puritani, opposite Joan Sutherland, Alfonso in La favorite, Wolfram, Telramund, etc.

He was a singer and musician noted for his vocal quality, including a well-developed upper register and clear diction. He achieved an international career as a post-war French singer. After retiring from performance, he taught in Paris.

== Selected recordings ==
- 1958 - Gounod - Faust - Victoria de los Angeles, Nicolai Gedda, Blanc, Boris Christoff - Choeurs et Orchestre de l'Opéra de Paris, André Cluytens - (EMI)
- 1959 - Bizet - Carmen - De los Angeles, Gedda, Janine Micheau, Blanc - Choeurs et Orchestre de la RTF, Thomas Beecham - (EMI)
- 1960 - Bizet - Les pêcheurs de perles - Micheau, Gedda, Blanc, Jacques Mars - Choeurs et Orchestre de l'Opéra-Comique, Pierre Dervaux - (EMI)
- 1962 - Saint-Saëns - Samson et Dalila - Jon Vickers, Rita Gorr, Blanc, Anton Diakov - Choeurs René Duclos, Orchestre de l'Opéra de Paris, Georges Prêtre - (EMI)

== Sources ==
- Le guide de l'opéra, Mancini & Rouveroux, (Fayard, 1986), ISBN 2-213-01563-5
