= Carl Jörn =

German-American singer (1873–1947)

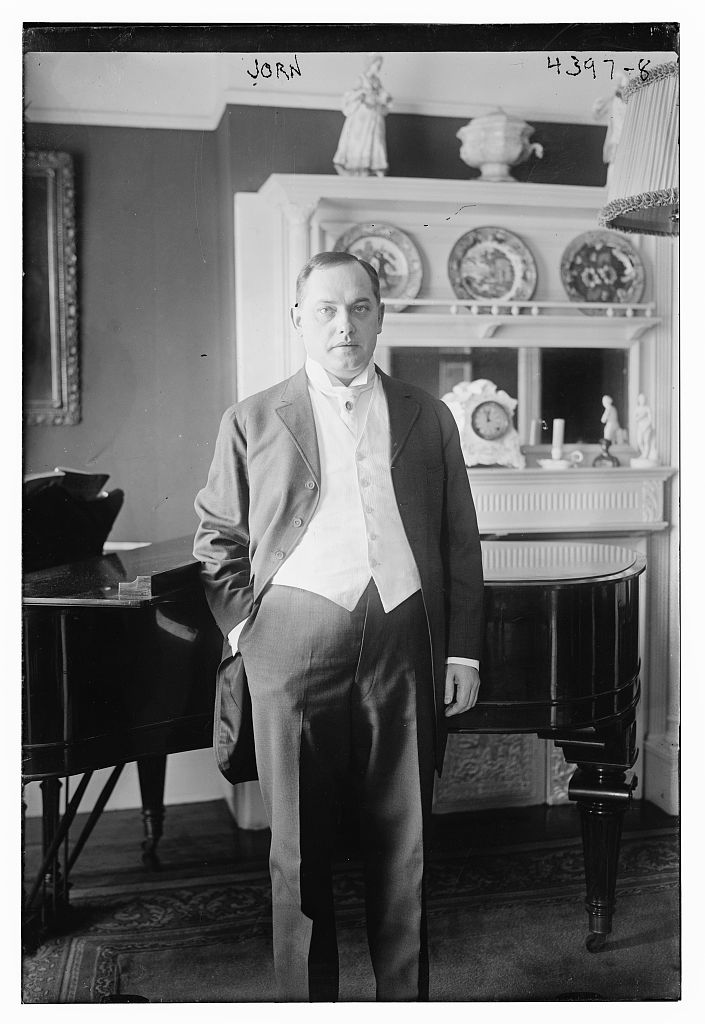

Background information
- Born: 5 January 1873
- Died: 19 December 1947 (aged 74)
- Genre: opera
- Instrument: tenor

Carl Jörn, also Karl Jörn (5 January 1873 – 19 December 1947) was a German American operatic tenor and voice teacher.

== Life ==
Born in Riga, Jörn, son of a master shoemaker, discovered his voice at the age of 18 and with it his future profession. A great patron of the arts and music offered him the means to prepare himself thoroughly for the stage. He owes his education to actor Schütte-Harmsen, vocal master Jacobs and his wife Luise Reuss-Belce (Berlin). He found his first engagement in Freiburg in 1896, where he made his debut as "Lyonel" and stayed for two years. In 1898 he joined the association of the Stadttheater in Zurich, and came from there on recommendation of Ludwig Barnay to the Hamburg State Opera (1899). On March 13, 1900 Jörn stood in for the court opera singer Adolf Philipp at the last hour. In 1902 he was firmly engaged, afterwards he went from 1902 to 1908 to the Staatsoper Unter den Linden. He was the favorite singer of Emperor Wilhelms II., who made him gifts several times.

From 1905 to 1908 he was a regular guest at the London Royal Opera, he also appeared as a guest in Brussels and Amsterdam.

In 1908 he went to the US to the Metropolitan Opera New York, where he worked until 1914.

In 1914 he created Parsifal at the Deutsches Opernhaus Berlin. Although they wanted to keep him in Berlin and even Emperor Wilhelm II supported his whereabouts, he went back to the US.

In 1916 he became a US citizen and ended his singing career. He lost his fortune through speculation with dubious inventions in the 1920s.

He then lived as a singing teacher in Denver. When Johanna Gadski toured the US with the German Opera Company from 1929 to 1931, she invited him to participate. In 1932 he opened a singing studio in New York, but later went back to Denver where he died at the age of 74.
