= Jacques Mars =

French opera singer (1926–2003)

- Mars in Aida
- Born: Jacques Hochard; 25 March 1926; Paris, France
- Died: 29 April 2003 (aged 77); Rueil-Malmaison, France
- Occupation: Operatic bass
- Organizations: Opéra de Paris

Jacques Mars (25 March 1926 – 29 April 2003) was a French operatic bass. Based at the Opéra de Paris, he made an international career. Golaud in Debussy's Pelléas et Mélisande and Mephisto in Gounod's Faust became his signature roles.

== Life and career ==
Jacques Hochard was born in Paris on 25 March 1926. He taught himself to play violin and pump organ. He discovered that he had a bass voice and trained it mostly on his own. He became a member of the ensemble of the Opéra de Paris in 1955 and made his debut as the Duke in Gounod's Roméo et Juliette in November 1956. Other roles there were the Commendatore in Mozart's Don Giovanni, Brander in La Damnation de Faust by Berlioz, Angelotti in Puccini's Tosca, Monterone in Verdi's Rigoletto, and Zuniga in Bizet's Carmen.

He appeared on 19 December 1958 in a gala performance with Maria Callas, singing excerpts from Verdi's Il trovatore broadcast on television. In 1963, he appeared in the French version of Verdi's Don Carlos at the Palais Garnier. The same year, he first portrayed Golaud in Debussy's Pelléas et Mélisande at the Opéra-Comique, conducted by Désiré-Emile Inghelbrecht. He was invited to perform the role at La Scala in Milan and the Glyndebourne Festival, where he appeared with Peter-Christoph Runge and Ileana Cotrubaș in the title roles, conducted by John Pritchard.

Mars performed the role of Mephisto in La Damnation de Faust first 1964, directed by Maurice Béjart. In 1966 he ortrayed the same character in Gounod's Faust; it became a signature role, especially in a controversial production by Jorge Lavelli which remained in the repertoire of the company. He portrayed the title role of Mussorgsky's Boris Godunov at the Opéra de Dijon. He appeared in the title role of Massenet's Don Quichotte of the Opéra de Monte-Carlo in 1979 for the centenary of the company, where the opera had premiered in 1910.

Mars also took part in world premieres, such as Gilbert Bécaud 's L'Opéra d'Aran in 1962 and Marcel Landowski's Montségur in 1985. He appeared at the Royal Opera House in 1991 as Calchas in Gluck's Iphigénie en Aulide. His voice was described as melodious and rich in colour, with clear tone and excellent diction.

Mars died in Rueil-Malmaison on 29 April 2003, at the age of 77.
