= Pia Di Ciaula =

Canadian film editor

- Education: Ryerson
- Occupation: Film editor

Pia Di Ciaula ACE, CCE is a BAFTA winning Canadian film editor. She is best known for editing A Very English Scandal, The Crown and Tyrannosaur.

== Personal life and education ==
Di Ciaula was one of six daughters born to Italian parents in Toronto. Her father was a dental technician. She attended Ryerson to study photography, where she discovered film editing in the second year.

== Early career ==
Upon graduation she initially worked as a camera assistant. She worked as assistant editor on a Paul Saltzman project as part of Sunrise Films. She then worked as an assistant sound effects editor on long-running programme Danger Bay, moving on to dialogue assistant and then picture assistant.

== Meeting Gillies MacKinnon and beyond ==
Di Ciaula met Scottish director Gillies MacKinnon at the Toronto International Film Festival where he was interviewing for roles for his upcoming film, Regeneration (1997). He hired Di Ciaula, who moved to the UK where they worked together on seven films, including Hideous Kinky (1998), The Last of the Blonde Bombshells (2000) and Pure (2002).

Di Ciaula's collaboration with director David Blair resulted in the multi-Emmy and BAFTA award winning show The Street (2006) and Tess of the D'Urbervilles (2008).

Di Ciaula's first collaboration with Paddy Considine on Tyrannosaur won approximately 40 awards world-wide, including Sundance Film Festival, British Independent Film Awards and a British Academy of Film and Television Arts. Their collaboration continued on his second film Journeyman which premiered at the BFI London Film Festival in 2017.

Di Ciaula's most recent film was The Union, directed by Julian Farino and released by Netflix.

== Television ==
Year	Title	Notes
1987-1990	Danger Bay	21 episodes
1992	Road to Avonlea	3 episodes
1993	Matrix	7 episodes
1993-1994	Ready or Not	4 episodes
1994	Squawk Box	1 episode
1994	RoboCop	1 episode
2003	A Tale of Two Wives (AKA Double Bill)	
2004	Gunpowder, Treason & Plot	Mini-series
2007-2009	The Street	4 episodes
2008	Tess of the D'Urbervilles	Mini-series
2008	Burn Up	Mini-series
2009	Blood and Oil	
2009	The Fattest Man in Britain	
2010	Strike Back	2 episodes
2016-2017	The Crown	3 episodes
2018	A Very English Scandal	Mini-series
2020	Quiz	

== Film ==
Year	Title	Director	Notes
1993	Hush Little Baby		TV film
1994	Another Woman		TV film
1995	Deadly Love	Jorge Montesi	TV film
1995	Falling for You		TV film
1995	Choices of the Heart: The Margaret Sanger Story	Paul Shapiro	TV film
1995	Dancing in the Dark		TV film
1995	Visitors of the Night		TV film
1996	The Deliverance of Elaine		TV film
1996	Intimate Relations	Philip Goodhew	
1996	Mother, May I Sleep with Danger?	Jorge Montesi	TV film
1996	Night Visitors		TV film
1997	Regeneration (AKA Behind the Lines)	Gillies MacKinnon	
1998	The Real Howard Spitz	Vadim Jean	
1998	Hideous Kinky	Gillies MacKinnon	
1999	The Last Yellow		
2000	Nora	Pat Murphy	
2000	The Last of the Blonde Bombshells	Gillies MacKinnon	TV film
2002	The Escapist	Gillies MacKinnon	
2002	Pure	Gillies MacKinnon	
2002	The One and Only	Simon Cellan Jones	
2003	Byron	Julian Farino	TV film
2005	Tara Road	Gillies MacKinnon	
2006	Mysterious Creatures	David Evans	TV film
2007	Stuart: A Life Backwards		TV film
2007	Silk	François Girard	
2011	Tyrannosaur	Paddy Considine	
2012	Best Laid Plans	David Blair	
2012	Bert and Dickie	David Blair	
2013	The Liability	Craig Viveiros	
2013	Belle	Amma Asante	
2014	The Journey Home	Roger Spottiswoode, Brando Quilici	
2016	Altamira	Hugh Hudson	
2016	A Quiet Passion	Terence Davies	
2017	Journeyman	Paddy Considine	
2019	Hope Gap	William Nicholson	
2019	Dirt Music	Gregor Jordan	
2021	Silent Night	Camille Griffin	
2022	The Lost King	Stephen Frears	
2024	The Union	Julian Farino	

== Awards ==
Year	Nominee / work	Award	Result
1995	Best Editor for Choices of the Heart: The Margaret Sanger Story	Gemini Award	Nominated
1996	Best Editor for Intimate Relations	Gemini Award	Nominated
1997	Best Editor for Regeneration	Gemini Award	Nominated
2016	Best Editor for The Crown Season 2, Ep 9 Paterfamilias	British Academy Television Craft Award for Best Editing: Fiction	Nominated
2016	Best Editor for The Crown Season 2, Ep 9 Paterfamilias	Canadian Cinema Editors Award	Won
2018	Best Editor for A Very English Scandal	British Academy Television Craft Award for Best Editing: Fiction	Won
2018	Best Editor for A Very English Scandal	Canadian Cinema Editors Award	Nominated
2020	Award for Editor - Drama for Quiz	Royal Television Society Craft & Design Awards	Won
2020	Best Editor for Quiz	BAFTA	Nominated
