= Paul Broks =

English neuropsychologist and science writer

Paul Broks is an English neuropsychologist and science writer.

== Career ==
Broks trained as a clinical psychologist at Oxford University and went on to specialize in neuropsychology. He followed a career combining both clinical practice with the National Health Service (NHS), and basic research, with academic posts at the universities of Sheffield, Birmingham and Plymouth. He turned to freelance writing after entering a popular science writing competition organised by New Scientist magazine, which resulted in a book deal. The resulting book, Into the Silent Land: Travels in Neuropsychology (2003), published by Atlantic Monthly Press, was shortlisted for the Guardian First Book Award 2003, and the short story To Be Two or Not To Be being adapted into a feature film with filmmaker David Lowery writing, directing and producing with Casey Affleck set to star.

His other work includes documentary collaborations with Hugh Hudson (Rupture: Living With My Broken Brain, 2012), for which he wrote the script for the voice-over, and Ian Knox (Martino Unstrung, 2008). He is a regular contributor to Prospect and has written for The Times, Sunday Times, Daily Telegraph, The Guardian, and Granta. His radio broadcasts include the History of Ideas 2015 BBC Radio 4.

He is currently based in Bath.
