= Elisa Frandin =

Finnish opera singer

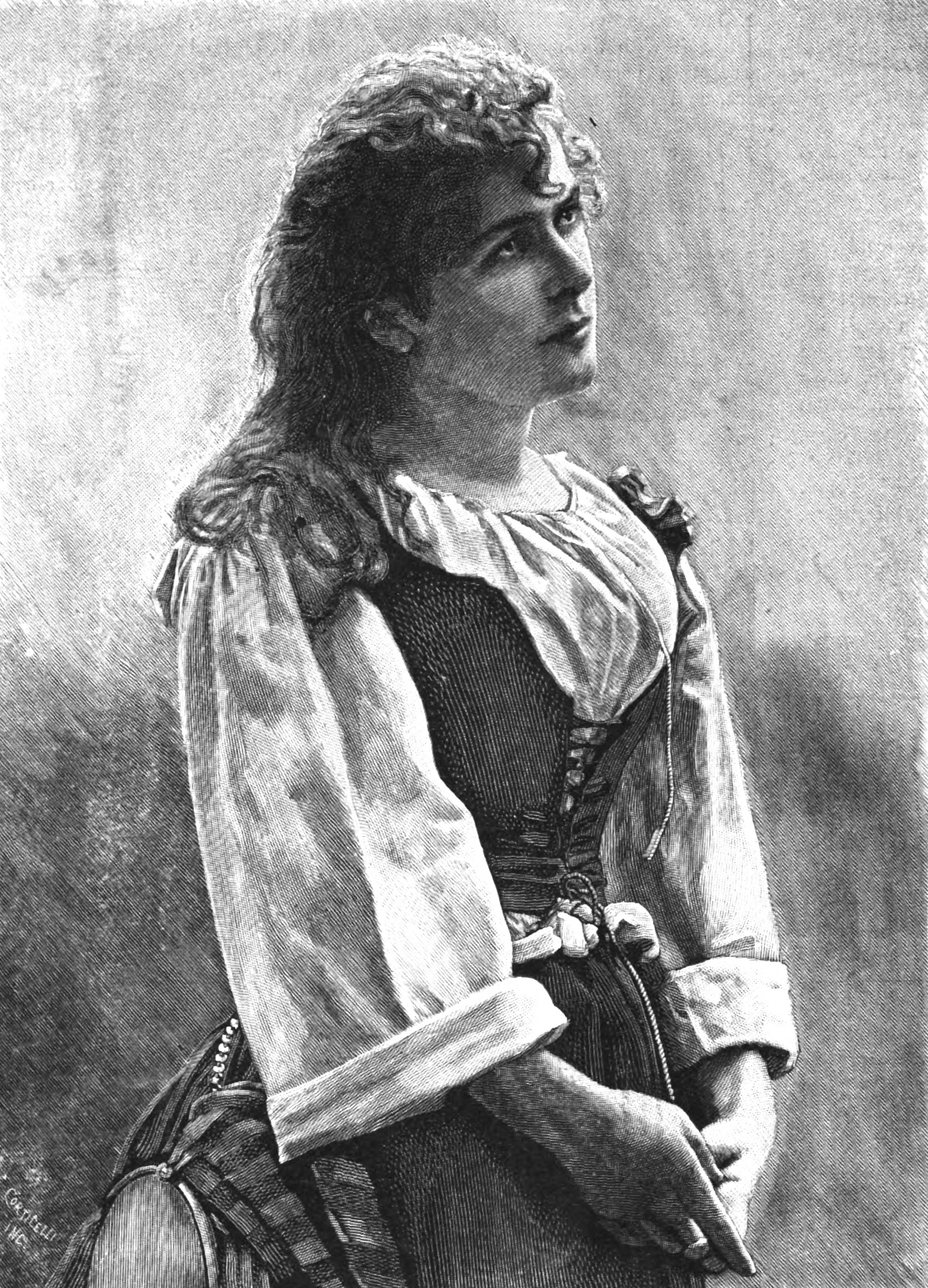
- Elisa Frandin as "Mignon", from a 1908 publication
- Born: Elisabeth Frandin; 7 April 1859; Helsinki, Grand Duchy of Finland
- Died: 24 January 1911 (aged 51); Milan, Kingdom of Italy
- Other names: Lison Frandin, Elisabeta Combi
- Occupations: Opera singer, voice teacher

Elisa Frandin (7 April 1865 – 24 January 1911) was a Finnish-French opera singer.

== Early life ==
Elisabeth Frandin was born in Helsinki, the daughter of Joseph-Hippolyte-Eugène Frandin and Pauline Lemagne. Her parents were French; her father was the French consul in Helsinki when she was born. Her older brother Joseph-Hippolyte Frandin (1852–1926), was a French diplomat in China, Korea, Colombia, and Ecuador.

Elisa Frandin studied voice at the Conservatoire de Paris with Joseph-Théodore-Désiré Barbot and Louis-Henri Obin. She won several awards as a Conservatoire student.

== Career ==
Frandin, who sang soprano and mezzo-soprano parts, made her professional debut in Paris in 1881, in Grissart's Les Poupées de l'Infante. Frandin sang in operas in Cairo, Barcelona, Monte Carlo, Berlin, and many Italian cities. Her repertoire included roles in Lakmé by Delibes (1883), Bizet's Carmen, Verdi's Aida, Maillart's Les dragons de Villars, Auber's Le Domino Noir, Boito's Mefistofele, Mascagni's Cavalleria rusticana, Massenet's Werther and La Navarraise (1895–1896), and Leoncavallo's La bohème (1897). She and Marie van Zandt were the first to sing the well-known Flower Duet from Lakmé, in Paris in 1883.

Frandin survived a train accident in 1893, but lost all her theatrical luggage, including costumes and jewelry; she was compensated with ₤500,000 by the railway company. She retired from the stage when she married in 1897, and opened a music school in Milan.

== Personal life ==
Frandin married Italian journalist Carlo Combi in 1897. They had a son, Mario Combi, born in 1898. She died in 1911, aged 51 years, in Milan.
