= Lakmé =

1883 opera by Léo Delibes

- Opera by Léo Delibes
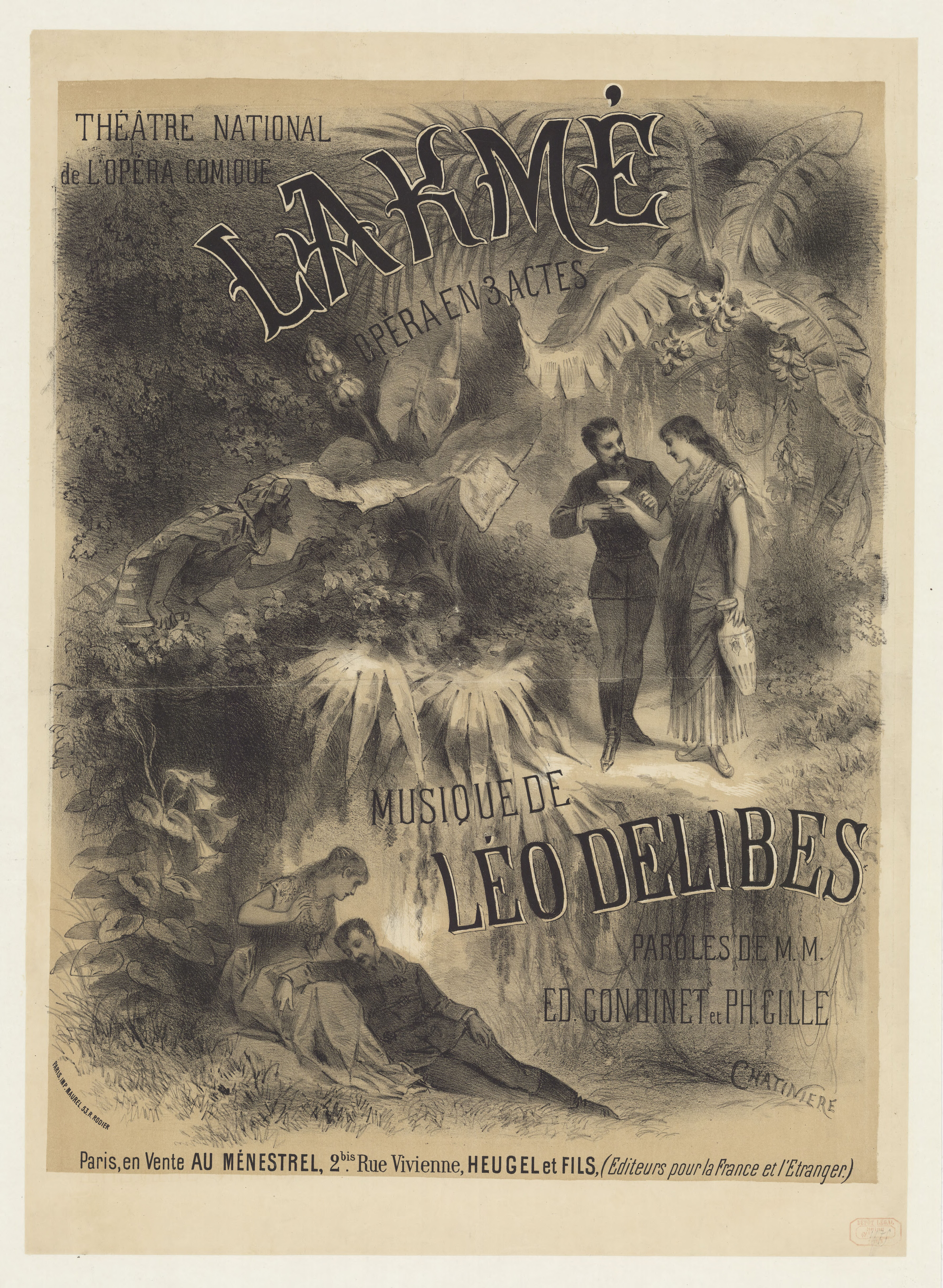
- Original poster
- Librettist: Edmond Gondinet; Philippe Gille
- Language: French
- Based on: Théodore Pavie's story "Les babouches du Brahmane" and Pierre Loti's novel Le Mariage de Loti
- Premiere: 14 April 1883; Opéra-Comique, Paris

Lakmé is an opera in three acts by Léo Delibes to a French libretto by Edmond Gondinet and Philippe Gille.

The score, written from 1881 to 1882, was first performed on 14 April 1883 by the Opéra-Comique at the (second) Salle Favart in Paris, with stage decorations designed by Auguste Alfred Rubé and Philippe Chaperon (act 1), Eugène Carpezat and (Joseph-) Antoine Lavastre (act 2), and Jean-Baptiste Lavastre (act 3). Set in British India in the mid-19th century, Lakmé is based on Théodore Pavie's story "Les babouches du Brahmane" (1849) and the novel Le Mariage de Loti (1880) by Pierre Loti. Gondinet proposed it as a vehicle for the American soprano Marie van Zandt. The opera's most famous aria is the "Bell Song" ("L'Air des clochettes") in act 2.

The opera includes the popular "Flower Duet" ("Dôme épais le jasmin") for a soprano and mezzo-soprano, performed in act 1 by Lakmé, the daughter of a Brahmin priest, and her servant Mallika. The name Lakmé is the French rendition of Sanskrit Lakshmi, the name of the Hindu goddess of wealth. An adaptation of this song was used in the British Airways face advertisement in 1989.

Lakmé combines many orientalist aspects that were popular at the time: an exotic location, similar to other French operas of the period, such as Bizet's Les pêcheurs de perles and Massenet's Le roi de Lahore, a fanatical priest, mysterious Hindu rituals, and "the novelty of exotically colonial English people".

== Performance history ==
Following its premiere at the Opéra-Comique in 1883, Lakmé reached its 500th performance there on 23 June 1909 and 1,000th on 13 May 1931. A series of performances took place at the Théâtre Gaîté Lyrique Paris in 1908, with Alice Verlet, David Devriès and Félix Vieuille.

== Roles ==
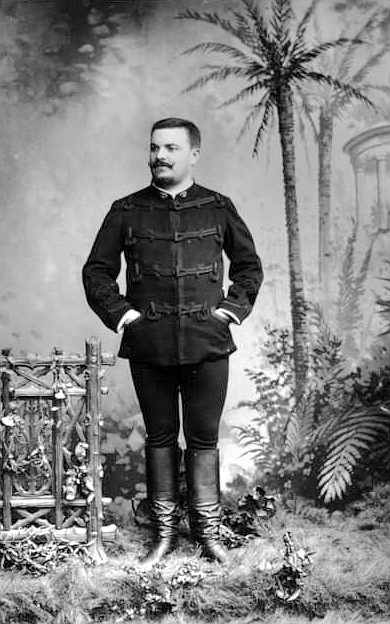
Jean-Alexandre Talazac as Gérald

Roles, voice types, premiere cast
| Role | Voice type | Premiere cast, 14 April 1883 Conductor: Jules Danbé |
|---|---|---|
| Lakmé, a priestess, daughter of Nilakantha | coloratura soprano | Marie van Zandt |
| Gérald, a British army officer | tenor | Jean-Alexandre Talazac |
| Nilakantha, a Brahmin priest | bass | Cobalet |
| Frédéric, officer friend of Gérald | baritone | Barré |
| Mallika, slave of Lakmé | mezzo-soprano | Elisa Frandin |
| Hadji, slave of Nilakantha | tenor | Chennevière |
| Miss Ellen, fiancée of Gérald | soprano | Rémy |
| Miss Rose, companion of Ellen | soprano | Zoé Molé-Truffier |
| Mistress Bentson, a governess | mezzo-soprano | Pierron |
| Fortune teller (Un Domben) | tenor | Teste |
| A Chinese merchant | tenor | Davoust |
| Le Kouravar | baritone | Bernard |
Chorus: Officers, ladies, merchants, Brahmins, musicians

== Synopsis ==
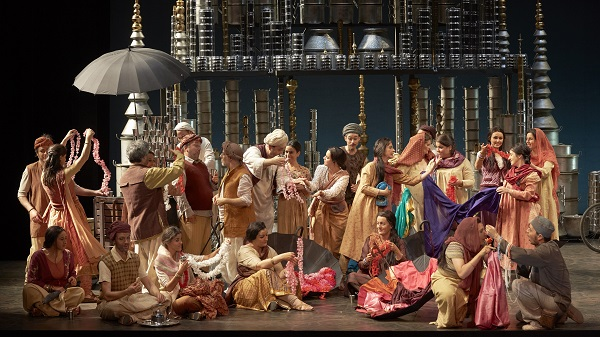
Opéra-Comique, 2017

Place: India
Time: Late nineteenth century, during the British Raj.

=== Act 1 ===
The Hindus go to perform their rites in a sacred Brahmin temple under the high priest, Nilakantha. Nilakantha's daughter Lakmé, and her servant Mallika, are left behind and go down to the river to gather flowers where they sing together the "Flower Duet". As they approach the water at the river bank, Lakmé removes her jewellery and places it on a bench. Two British officers, Frédéric and Gérald (Delibes uses Frenchified versions of the then common English names Frederick and Gerald), arrive nearby on a picnic with two British girls and their governess. The British girls see the jewellery and, impressed with it, request sketches of it; Gérald volunteers to stay and make sketches of the jewellery. He spots Lakmé and Mallika returning and hides. Mallika leaves Lakmé for a while; while alone Lakmé sees Gérald and, frightened by the foreigner's incursion, cries out for help. However, simultaneously, she is also intrigued by him and so she sends away those who had responded to her call for help when they come to her aid. Lakmé and Gérald begin to fall in love with each other. Nilakantha returns and learns of the British officer's trespassing, vowing revenge on him for what he assumes to be an affront to Lakmé's honour.

=== Act 2 ===
At a busy bazaar, Nilakantha forces Lakmé to sing (the "Bell Song") in order to lure the trespasser into identifying himself. When Gérald steps forward, Lakmé faints, thus giving him away. Nilakantha stabs Gérald, wounding him. Lakmé takes Gérald to a secret hideout in the forest, where she lovingly nurses him back to health.

=== Act 3 ===
In the forest, Lakmé and Gérald hear singing in the distance. Gérald is frightened, but Lakme tells him that the singers are a group of lovers that seek out the water of a magical spring. When drunk, the water grants eternal love to the couple. While Lakmé fetches water that will confirm the vows of the lovers, Fréderic, Gérald's fellow British officer, appears and reminds him of his military duty to his regiment. Gérald sadly accepts that his colleague is correct. After Lakmé returns, she senses the change in Gérald and realises that she has lost him. Rather than live with dishonor, she tears a leaf from a poisonous datura tree and bites into it. She tells Gérald what she has just done and they drink the water together. Nilakantha finds their hut and enters as Lakmé is dying. She tells her father that she and Gérald drank from the magical spring. In that instant, she dies.

== Music ==
In conventional form and pleasant style, but given over to the fashion for exoticism, the delicate orchestration and melodic richness earned Delibes a success with audiences. The passionate elements of the opera are given warm and expressive music, while the score in general is marked by subtle harmonic colours and deft orchestration. Oriental colour is used in prayers, incantations, dances and the scene in the market.

The act 2 aria "Où va la jeune Hindoue?" (the Bell Song) has long been a favourite recital piece for coloratura sopranos. (Recordings of it in Italian, as "Dov'è l'indiana bruna?", also exist.)

=== Musical numbers ===
- Prelude

==== Act 1 ====
- No. 1 Introduction: "À l'heure accoutumée" (At the usual time) (Nilakantha)
- Prayer: "Blanche Dourga" (White Durga) (Lakmé, Nilakantha)
- No. 1b – Scene: "Lakmé, c'est toi qui nous protège!" (Lakmé, it is you who protect us!) (Nilakantha, Lakmé)
- No. 2 – Duet (Flower Duet): "Viens, Mallika, les lianes en fleurs ... Dôme épais, le jasmin" (Come Mallika, the lianas in bloom ... The jasmine forms a dense dome) (Lakmé, Mallika)
- Scene: "Miss Rose, Miss Ellen" (Gérald)
- No. 3 – Quintet & couplets: "Quand une femme est si jolie" (When a woman is so pretty) (Gérald)
- Recitative: "Nous commettons un sacrilège" (We are committing sacrilege) (Gérald)
- No. 4 – Air: "Prendre le dessin d'un bijou" (Make a drawing of a jewel) (Gérald)
- No. 4b – Scene: "Non! Je ne veux pas toucher" (No! I do not want to touch) (Gérald, Lakmé)
- No. 5 – Recitative & Strophes: "Les fleurs me paraissent plus belles" (The flowers appear more beautiful to me) (Lakmé)
- No. 5b – Recitative: "Ah! Mallika! Mallika!" (Lakmé)
- No. 6 – Duet: "D'où viens-tu? Que veux-tu?" (Where are you from? What do you want?) (Lakmé, Gérald)
- No. 6b – Scene: "Viens! Là! Là!" (Come! There! There!) (Nilakantha, Lakmé)

==== Act 2 ====
- Entr'acte
- No. 7 – Chorus & March: "Allons, avant que midi sonne" (Come before noon sounds)
- No. 7b – Recitative: "Enfin! Nous aurons du silence!" (Finally! We will have silence!)
- No. 8 – Airs de danse: Introduction
- No. 8 – Airs de danse: Terana
- No. 8 – Airs de danse: Rektah
- No. 8 – Airs de danse: Persian
- No. 8 – Airs de danse: Coda avec Choeurs
- No. 8 – Airs de danse: Sortie
- Recitative: "Voyez donc ce vieillard" (So see that old man)
- No. 9 – Scène & Stances: "Ah! Ce vieillard encore!"" (Ah! That old man again!) (Nilankantha, Lakmé)
- No. 9b – Recitative: "Ah! C'est de ta douleur" (Ah! It's your pain) (Lakmé, Nilankantha)
- No. 10 – Scène & Légende de la fille du Paria (Air des Clochettes/The Bell Song):
  "Ah!... Par les dieux inspires... Où va la jeune Hindoue" (Ah... Inspired by the gods... Where is the Hindu girl going) (Lakmé, Nilankantha)
- No. 11 – Scène: "La rage me dévore" (Rage consumes me) (Nilankantha, Lakmé)
- No. 12 – Scène & Choeur: "Au milieu des chants d'allegresse" (Amid chants of cheerfulness) (Nilankantha, Lakmé)
- No. 12b – Recitative: "Le maître ne pense qu'à sa vengeance" (The master thinks only of his revenge)
- No. 13 – Duet: "Lakmé! Lakmé! C'est toi!" (Lakmé! Lakmé! It's you!) (Lakmé, Gérald)
- No. 14 – Finale: "O Dourga, toi qui renais" (O Durga, you who are reborn) (Gérald)

==== Act 3 ====
- Entr'acte
- No. 15 – Berceuse: "Sous le ciel tout étoilé" (Beneath the star-filled sky) (Lakmé)
- No. 15b – Recitative: "Quel vague souvenir alourdit ma pensée?" (What vague memory weighs down my thought?) (Gérald, Lakmé)
- No. 16 – Cantilène: "Lakmé! Lakmé! Ah! Viens dans la forêt profonde" (Lakmé! Lakmé! Ah! Come into the deep forest) (Gérald)
- No. 17 – Scène & Choeur: "Là, je pourrai t'entendre (There I will be able to hear you) (Lakmé, Gérald)
- No. 18 – Scène: "Vivant!" (Alive!) (Gérald)
- No. 19 – Duet: "Ils allaient deux à deux" (They went two by two) (Lakmé, Gérald)
- No. 20 – Finale: "C'est lui! C'est lui!" (It's him! It's him!) (Nilankantha, Lakmé, Gérald)

== Cultural references ==
In recent years, the Flower Duet in Act 1 has become familiar more widely because of its use in advertisements, in particular a British Airways commercial, as well as in films. The duet sung by Lakme and Mallika was adapted for the theme "Aria on air" for the British Airways "face" advertisements of the 1980s by music composers Yanni and Malcolm McLaren.

== Recordings ==
=== Audio ===
- 1940: Lily Pons (Lakmé), Armand Tokatyan (Gérald), Ezio Pinza (Nilakantha), Ira Petina (Mallika), New York Metropolitan Opera Chorus and Orchestra, Wilfrid Pelletier (conductor) (The Golden Age; live)
- 1952: Mado Robin (Lakmé), Libero de Luca (Gérald), Jacques Jansen (Frédéric), Jean Borthayre (Nilakantha), Agnés Disney (Mallika), Chœurs et Orchestre du Théâtre National de l'Opéra-Comique, Georges Sébastian (conductor) (Decca)
- 1967: Joan Sutherland (Lakmé), Alain Vanzo (Gérald), Gabriel Bacquier (Nilakantha), Jane Berbié (Mallika), Chœurs et Orchestre National de l'Opéra de Monte-Carlo, Richard Bonynge (conductor) (Decca)
- 1970: Mady Mesplé (Lakmé), Charles Burles (Gérald), Roger Soyer (Nilakantha), Danielle Millet (Mallika), Chœurs et Orchestre du Théâtre National de l'Opéra-Comique, Alain Lombard (conductor) (EMI)
- 1998: Natalie Dessay (Lakmé), Gregory Kunde (Gérald), José van Dam (Nilakantha), Delphine Haidan (Mallika), Chœur et Orchestre du Capitole de Toulouse, Michel Plasson (conductor) (EMI)

=== Video ===
- 1976: Joan Sutherland (Lakmé), Henri Wilden (Gérald), Clifford Grant (Nilakantha), Huguette Tourangeau (Mallika), Isobel Buchanan (Ellen), John Pringle (Frédéric), Sydney Elizabethan Orchestra, Australian Opera Chorus, Richard Bonynge (conductor), Norman Ayrton (director). Virgin Classics VVD 1137 (VHS), BMG BVLO 149-50 (LaserDisc); Kultur D0038 (DVD)
- 2012: Emma Matthews (Lakmé), Aldo di Toro (Gérald), Stephen Bennett (Nilakantha), Opera Australia Chorus and Australian Opera and Ballet Orchestra, Emmanuel Joel-Hornak (conductor) (Opera Australia OPOZ56021BD (Blu-ray), OPOZ56020DVD (DVD), OPOZ56022CD)
