= Altamira (film) =

Finding Altamira
- Theatrical release poster
- Directed by: Hugh Hudson
- Screenplay by: José Luis López-Linares; Olivia Hetreed
- Produced by: Lucrecia Botin; Álvaro Longoria; Andy Paterson
- Starring: Antonio Banderas; Golshifteh Farahani; Nicholas Farrell; Henry Goodman; Pierre Niney; Clement Sibony; Allegra Allen; Rupert Everett
- Cinematography: José Luis Alcaine
- Edited by: Pia Di Ciaula
- Music by: Mark Knopfler, Evelyn Glennie
- Distributed by: Eagle Films; Samuel Goldwyn Films; 20th Century Fox
- Release date: 1 April 2016 (Spain)
- Running time: 97 minutes
- Country: Spain
- Language: English / Spanish

Finding Altamira (released as Altamira in Spain) is a 2016 Spanish biographical drama film starring Antonio Banderas, and directed by Hugh Hudson. It was Hudson's first fiction film as director since I Dreamed of Africa in 2000, although he wrote the screenplay for the 2014 fictional film, The Journey Home. It was his final film before his death in 2023.

== Synopsis ==
The film chronicles the groundbreaking discovery of stone age cave paintings in the Cave of Altamira in Cantabria, Spain, and the subsequent controversy by leading religious and scientific figures of the day.

== Cast ==
- Antonio Banderas as Marcelino Sanz de Sautuola y de la Pedrueca
- Golshifteh Farahani as Conchita
- Allegra Allen as María Sautuola
  - Irene Escolar as Older María Sautuola
- Clément Sibony as Émile Cartailhac
- Henry Goodman as De Los Ríos
- Pierre Niney as Paul Ratier
- Rupert Everett as Monsignor
- Javivi as Harlé
- Nicholas Farrell as Vilanova
- Lluís Soler as Mero
- Tábata Cerezo as Pasi
- Chantal Garsan as Soprano
- Concha Hidalgo as Marchioness
- Katie Paterson as Carolina
- Maryam d'Abo as Elena
- José Luis Esteban as Padre Tomás
- Gonzalo Cunill as Cubillas
- Ximena Vera as Sister
- Kike Guaza as King Alfonso XII
- Tristán Ulloa as Abbé Breuil
- Carlos Camino as Boy
- Javier Laorden as Editor
- Dylan Moreno as Mayor

== Production ==
The film was shot in Santillana del Mar, Comillas, Puente San Miguel and Santander at the end of 2014.

== Soundtrack ==
The music was composed by guitarist Mark Knopfler and percussionist Evelyn Glennie.

== Reception ==
The film has a score of 57% on Metacritic.

Johnathan Holland of The Hollywood Reporter called the film "picturesque, but routine" and wrote that "little of the wow factor is felt on a first viewing of the Antonio Banderas-starring, Hugh Hudson-directed Finding Altamira, where events which played a footnote role in Darwin's great scientific revolution are reduced to a good-looking but unimaginative period drama in which everything proceeds exactly as expected".
