= Norman Ayrton =

Norman Ayrton (25 September 1924 – 22 June 2017) was an actor, director, and theatre instructor.

As a young man, Ayrton's home was bombed during the London Blitz, forcing him to relocate to the countryside. He later described this experience as having given him the courage to pursue a career in theatre. He trained for the stage at the Old Vic School under the tutelage of Michel Saint-Denis before joining the company in 1948. After spending several years acting in repertory theatre in Farnham and Oxford, Ayrton returned to the Old Vic Theatre in 1951 to teach movement. The following year he opened his own teaching studio in London, while he also taught at the Royal Shakespeare Theatre in Stratford.

In 1954, Ayrton was appointed the Assistant Principal of the London Academy of Music and Dramatic Art, a position he held until 1966, whenceforth he served as the Academy's Principal until 1972. Ayrton served as the CHQ Drama Adviser to the Girl Guide Movement from 1960 through 1975. In 1973, Ayrton served as a guest theatre consultant to the Australian Council for the Arts. In 1963, he directed his first London opera production with Artaxerxes at the Handel Society. He went on to direct his first production in the United States in 1967 with Twelfth Night in Dallas, Texas. Ayrton joined the faculty at the Juilliard School in 1974. Two years later, he directed his first production at the Sydney Opera House with Lakmé. Ayrton has also directed operas at the Covent Garden.

In his later years, Ayrton taught classes in the British American Drama Academy's Midsummer Conservatory Program, a summer Shakespearean acting workshop for students from the UK, US, and Mexico.

He died at Denville Hall on 22 June 2017 at the age of 92.
