= Hideous Kinky (film) =

- Hideous Kinky film poster
- Directed by: Gillies MacKinnon
- Screenplay by: Billy MacKinnon
- Based on: Hideous Kinky by Esther Freud
- Produced by: Ann Scott
- Starring: Kate Winslet; Saïd Taghmaoui
- Cinematography: John de Borman
- Edited by: Pia Di Ciaula
- Music by: John E. Keane
- Production companies: AMLF; Arts Council of England; BBC Films; The Film Consortium; Greenpoint Films; L Films
- Distributed by: AMLF (France); United International Pictures (United Kingdom)
- Release date: 2 October 1998
- Running time: 98 min.
- Countries: France; United Kingdom
- Languages: English; French; Arabic
- Budget: £3.2 million
- Box office: $1,263,279 (Domestic)

Hideous Kinky is a 1998 drama film directed by Scottish director Gillies MacKinnon. Based on Esther Freud's semi-autobiographical 1992 novel of the same name, it follows a young English mother who moves from London to Morocco with her two young daughters in the early 1970s. The film stars Kate Winslet and French-Moroccan actor Saïd Taghmaoui. The soundtrack mixes original music with songs from the 1960s, including tracks from Canned Heat, Richie Havens, and The Incredible String Band.

== Plot ==
In 1972, Julia is a 25-year-old English woman disillusioned with her life in London, who travels to Morocco with her two daughters, six-year-old Lucy and eight-year-old Bea. Their father, a London poet, sends occasional money from England. In Marrakesh, the three live in an inexpensive hotel, while Julia tries to make a living by selling handmade dolls. The girls appear to enjoy the freedom of their new surroundings, although Bea increasingly shows signs of missing her life in England.

The family meets Bilal, a Moroccan street performer and conman, who becomes romantically involved with Julia. He moves in with them and gradually assumes a surrogate fatherly role, although is frequently absent and has difficulties of his own. Julia also becomes interested in Sufism after meeting her friend Eva, who encourages her to travel to Algeria to study with a Sufi teacher at a school devoted to the "annihilation of the ego". The family continue moving between different locations as Julia struggles to find enough money to support them. They spend time with the European expatriate Santoni and later travel into the countryside.

As their money runs short, Bea becomes increasingly unhappy and tells Julia she does not want another adventure, but just wants to go to school. Julia leaves Bea temporarily in the care of friends while she and Lucy travel towards Algeria. Upon returning, Julia discovers that Bea has disappeared and after searching, learns that she has been taken in by Patricia, a Christian woman who runs an orphanage and appears reluctant to leave. Patricia tells Julia that Bea needs a more conventional and stable upbringing.

Julia recovers Bea and returns with both girls to Marrakesh, where they are briefly reunited with Bilal. Bea subsequently becomes seriously ill with a streptococcus infection while Bilal is away and is close to death, which forces Julia to confront the risks of continuing their current lifestyle. Julia and the girls eventually discover that Bilal has obtained three tickets to London by selling his distinctive uniform, allowing them to return home. They board a train for London, bringing their adventure to an end.

== Cast ==
- Kate Winslet as Julia
- Saïd Taghmaoui as Bilal
- Bella Riza as Bea
- Carrie Mullan as Lucy
- Pierre Clémenti as Santoni (final film role)
- Sira Stampe as Eva
- Abigail Cruttenden as Charlotte
- Amidou as Sufi Sheikh
- Michelle Fairley as Patricia

== Production ==
The film was shot on location in Morocco.

Both Bella Riza and Carrie Mullan were both the same age, despite their characters having a 2-year age gap. Winslet had previously said she would not work with children, however made an exception for the film, saying "it was so easy, because they are so gorgeous". Winslet intentionally chose to participate in a British film, following the 1997 film Titanic.

== Reception ==
Contemporary review aggregation website Rotten Tomatoes gives the film an 68% approval rating from 50 critics.

Kate Winslet's performance won praise from many reviewers. In Entertainment Weekly, Lisa Schwartzbaum argued that Winslet "perfectly projects that naive self-centeredness with which a Woodstock generation of young wanderers, seeking spiritual revelation, made their way to cultures as exotic as their thumbs could take them". In Variety, critic Lisa Nesselson also praised the "radiant" and "sturdy" Winslet for her performance, and argued that the film was "filtered through a sober and intelligent artistic eye". Rolling Stone reviewer Craig Mathieson called the film "a compelling authentic journey".
