= Jean-Alexandre Talazac =

French operatic tenor

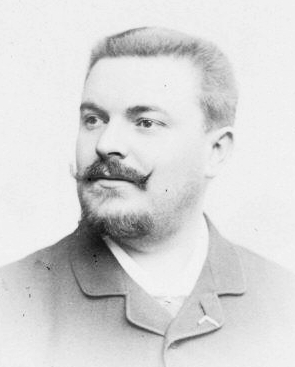
Jean-Alexandre Talazac

Jean-Alexandre Talazac (French pronunciation: [ʒɑ̃ alɛksɑ̃dʁ talazak]; 16 May 1853 – 26 December 1892) was a French operatic tenor, particularly associated with the French repertory.

Talazac was born in Bordeaux. He studied at the Conservatoire de Paris, and made his debut in 1877 at the Théâtre Lyrique. In 1878, he made his debut at the Opéra-Comique where he was to enjoy his greatest success, creating there the title role in Les contes d'Hoffmann on 10 February 1881, Gérald in Lakmé on 14 April 1883, des Grieux in Manon on 19 January 1884 and Mylio in Le roi d'Ys on 7 May 1888. He also sang at the Paris premiere of Samson et Dalila at the Théâtre Lyrique, on 31 October 1890.

In 1889, he first appeared at the Royal Opera House in London, as Alfredo in La traviata, Faust, and Nadir in Bizet's Les pêcheurs de perles. He also made guest appearances at the Monte Carlo Opera, La Monnaie in Brussels, and the Teatro Nacional Sao Carlos in Lisbon. He was also active in concert and recital.

Other notable roles included; Méhul's Joseph, Tamino in Die Zauberflöte, Wilhelm Meister in Mignon, Fernand in La favorite, Edgardo in Lucia di Lammermoor, and Raoul in Les Huguenots.

A highly stylish singer noted for the purity and brilliance of his voice, he was married to soprano Hélène Fauvelle in 1880; she gave up her career after her marriage. The couple were the parents of singer and actress Odette Talazac (1883–1948). He died in Chatou, near Paris.

== Sources ==
- Operissimo.com
