= Dark Skies (2013 film) =

- Theatrical release poster
- Directed by: Scott Stewart
- Written by: Scott Stewart
- Produced by: Jason Blum; Couper Samuelson; Jeanette Brill
- Starring: Keri Russell; Josh Hamilton; Dakota Goyo; J. K. Simmons
- Cinematography: David Boyd
- Edited by: Peter Gvodas
- Music by: Joseph Bishara
- Production companies: Dimension Films; Alliance Films; IM Global; Blumhouse Productions; Robotproof
- Distributed by: Dimension Films; The Weinstein Company (United States); Alliance Films (Canada)
- Release date: February 22, 2013 (United States)
- Running time: 97 minutes
- Countries: United States; Canada
- Language: English
- Budget: $3.5 million
- Box office: $27.8 million

Dark Skies is a 2013 science fiction horror film written and directed by Scott Stewart, produced by Jason Blum under his Blumhouse Productions banner, and starring Keri Russell, Josh Hamilton, Dakota Goyo and J. K. Simmons.

Dark Skies was released in the United States on February 22, 2013, by Dimension Films. The film grossed $27.8 million worldwide and received mixed reviews from critics, with many praising the performances, premise and ambition, but criticized the screenplay for its muddled plot and characters.

== Plot ==
The Barrett family—mother Lacy, father Daniel, older son Jesse, and younger son Sammy—reside on a quiet suburban street in an unnamed American city. Daniel is currently unemployed, placing the burden of supporting the family on Lacy, who works as a real estate agent. Their two sons enjoy a happy relationship and communicate with each other from their beds via walkie-talkie. A number of strange occurrences befall the family. During the night, the contents of the kitchen are rearranged in bizarre configurations. The house alarm is set off when it detects that all entry points were breached simultaneously. Sammy suffers a fit while at the park, and Lacy is shocked when hundreds of birds suddenly crash into the house.

One night, Lacy is awakened by a sound from Sammy's room. When she checks on him, she sees a figure standing over his bed. She turns on the light to find an empty room. Sammy is found walking away from the house but cannot remember leaving. Lacy, Daniel and Jesse each suffer catatonic episodes and regain consciousness with no memory of their experiences. It is discovered at a pool party that Sammy has marks on his body, while Jesse experiences an episode in the woods and is admitted to the hospital where geometric shapes are also discovered on his body, prompting the doctors to alert Child Protective Services.

Greatly disturbed by the various phenomena afflicting the family and the house, Lacy begins to search online for answers and finds articles attributing some of what they have experienced to UFOs and reports of alien abduction. Daniel installs security cameras throughout the house. Daniel reviews the night's footage and frame-by-frame analysis reveals three dark figures standing over their beds as they slept. Now believing that there is an extraterrestrial force at work, Lacy and Daniel seek the help of a specialist, Edwin Pollard, who calls the beings "the Greys."

Pollard informs them that many others have suffered the same fate as the Barretts with most cases ending in a child abduction. Edwin warns the Barretts that the person who the Greys first show interest in is usually the one who is abducted and that they should be highly protective of Sammy, whom he believes has been "chosen." Daniel buys a shotgun while Lacy adopts an aggressive guard dog. The family spends the Fourth of July boarding up the windows and front door of the house, then they eat dinner as Daniel flips the TV on to a program showing fireworks and playing patriotic music, reminiscing about happier times.

Suddenly, the TV fills with static, and the house lights begin to flicker, while the dog starts barking ferociously towards a boarded up window. Daniel sends Lacy and the boys upstairs to Jesse's room as he arms himself with the shotgun. A bright light starts to shine outside the window towards Daniel. Upstairs, Lacy instructs both boys to not open the door under any circumstance. The power in the house goes off as Lacy stands guard outside the bedroom door armed with a kitchen knife. Hearing the TV in her bedroom turn on, she walks towards it, unaware of a being standing directly behind her, and she becomes trapped in the bedroom. Daniel gets Jesse and Sammy into his and Lacy's room where they barricade themselves inside and huddle together on the bed. The TV begins to flicker again and the beings materialize in the room.

Jesse blacks out and experiences a hallucination in which his father commits suicide alongside his mother's bloodied body. Seeing his brother, Jesse chases after Sammy before reawakening in the upstairs hallway of his house. The Greys appear in front of him, and he disappears with them in a flash of light, the rest of the family powerless to help. Three months later, Lacy and Daniel are suspects in Jesse's disappearance case and have moved into an apartment. Pollard dolefully cuts out a newspaper article about Jesse's disappearance and hangs it on his wall with other pictures of missing children. As Lacy is going through old things, she finds pictures that Jesse drew as a child that shows the Greys surrounding him. She belatedly realizes that it was Jesse, not Sammy, in whom the Greys first showed interest, and that he was the one who had been chosen. Feedback then emanates from a nearby walkie-talkie as Lacy and Daniel both hear Jesse's faint voice calling Sammy's name.

== Cast ==
- Keri Russell as Lacy Barrett
- Josh Hamilton as Daniel Barrett
- Dakota Goyo as Jesse Barrett
- Kadan Rockett as Sammy Barrett
- J. K. Simmons as Edwin Pollard
- L. J. Benet as Kevin Ratner
- Rich Hutchman as Mike Jessop
- Myndy Crist as Karen Jessop
- Annie Thurman as Shelly Jessop
- Jack Washburn as Bobby Jessop
- Ron Ostrow as Richard Klein
- Cary Quattrocchi as Martin Haldeman
- Brian Stepanek as Security system technician
- Judith Moreland as Janice Rhodes
- Trevor St. John as Alex Holcombe
- Alyvia Alyn Lind as Young Daughter

== Production ==
Production commenced on August 3, 2012. Filming locations included Los Angeles and Valencia, CA (College of the Canyons). The film was written and directed by Scott Stewart, and produced by Jason Blum, Jeanette Brill, and Couper Samuelson. The film's screenplay that Stewart wrote himself took about six weeks to complete.

== Release ==
Dark Skies was released in the United States on February 22, 2013, and in the United Kingdom on April 5, 2013.

=== Home media ===
The film was released on DVD and Blu-ray on May 28, 2013. Together, the Blu-ray and DVD grossed $6.6 million in domestic video sales.

== Reception ==
=== Critical response ===
Dark Skies received mixed reviews from film critics. Review aggregator Rotten Tomatoes gives the film a 42% rating, based on reviews from 93 critics, with the site's critical consensus being: "Dark Skies writer-director Scott Stewart has a solid cast, an interesting premise, and some admirable ambitions, but he can't figure out what to do with any of them, and the result is a dull, muddled effort that will bore all but the most devoted horror buffs." Metacritic gives the film a score of 50 out of 100, based on reviews from 19 critics, indicating "mixed or average" reviews. Audiences polled by CinemaScore gave the film an average grade of "C+" on an A+ to F scale.

Michael O'Sullivan of The Washington Post gave the film two out of four stars, and wrote that "[t]he movie builds a moderate, if less than monumental, level of spookiness, regardless of your ignorance. It's a workmanlike piece of suspense." In a moderately favorable review for The New York Times, Andy Webster praised the film for the "consummate dexterity" with which it employs worn-out horror devices.
