= British Airways face advertisement =

Television commercial by British Airways

Face
- Smiling face formed by a crowd of people
- Agency: Saatchi & Saatchi
- Client: British Airways
- Language: English
- Running time: 92 seconds
- Release date: 1989
- Written by: Graham Fink; Jeremy Clarke
- Directed by: Hugh Hudson
- Music by: Malcolm McLaren, Yanni
- Country: United Kingdom

The British Airways "Face" advertisement was a television commercial campaign by British Airways in 1989. The commercial was made by advertising firm Saatchi & Saatchi, having been written by Graham Fink and Jeremy Clarke, with Hugh Hudson as director. It is often considered to be a television commercial classic. Vocals sung by "Monalisa Young" for The Award Winning "British Airways Commercial" called "Face". She also re-recorded "Aria" for "Yanni's Dare To Dream" Grammy Nominated Album.

== Production ==
The advertisement was produced in the US state of Utah, with thousands of extras participating in the advertisement. Places of production included Salt Lake City, Lake Powell, and the salt flats near Moab, Utah.

It was filmed in Utah in October 1989, with nine days of shooting. There were three days of travel.

- The Eye - Salt Lake City
- Ear - Heber
- Picasso face - Bonneville Salt Flats
- Face - Moab at Dead Horse Point State Park

There were around 6000 high school children, and around 200 actors. It cost $1.5m.

The final scene was choreographed by Judy Chabola, the choreographer of the 1984 Summer Olympics opening ceremony and 1992 Summer Olympics opening ceremony, who died of breast cancer aged 47 in May 1999. Subsequent Olympic opening ceremonies have been choreographed by Bryn Walters and Doug Jack.

== Content ==
Viewers first see a group of swimmers swimming, all wearing red clothing. A close-up of one of the swimmer's lips appears, and then a quick cut to an aerial view of the swimmers walking out of the water in the shape of human lips.

Afterwards, viewers see a group of people, wearing blue and black, walking on the streets of a city, forming the shape of an eye. And then, a group of people, wearing white, walking on a grassland and forming the shape of an ear. Afterwards, these groups of people (with the exception of the group that formed the ear, perhaps because they will eventually form the face instead) gather on a salt flat, and a scene is shown where people from all walks of life, from all cultures around the world unite, with the British Union Jack in the background, and British Airways crew members in the midst of it. A voiceover says "Every year, the world's favourite airline brings 24 million people, together".

The scene then cuts to an aerial view of the face, which smiles and winks. Afterwards, the face turns into the impression of the globe.

The sound track is "Aria" by Yanni and Malcolm McLaren, an adaptation of the "Flower Duet" from Léo Delibes' 1883 opera Lakmé.

== Versions ==
There are three versions of the commercial. One is the original version, which was recut into another version around 1994 because new uniform was introduced for British Airways crew members. Another version was aired during Christmas, where the ending was replaced with a child hugging Father Christmas and a cut into a view of Earth from space.

== Honours ==
The ad is often considered to be a British Airways classic, and it is ranked 62 on The 100 Greatest TV Ads television programme aired by Channel 4 in 2000. This was a poll conducted by Channel 4 and The Sunday Times. It ranked higher on ITV1's "ITV's Best Ads Ever" programme aired in 2005, ranking at number 15.

== Subsequent advert ==
Subsequent British Airways "Island" advertisements, which were also directed by Hugh Hudson and which aired beginning in 1995 and 1996, featured helicopters seen stretching large coloured sheets of white, red and blue across an island, arranged in such a way so that at the end of the advert, the island resembled the atlas of Earth.

== Parodies ==
In 1994, the ad was parodied by Hotpoint for their washing machines, featuring crowds of people in the shape of articles of clothing like T-shirts and underpants set to similar music.

In 2007, Silverjet parodied the ad, using the same locations and the Flower Duet aria on which the music for the original ad was based. The Silverjet ad also features a face, but it is formed of only four bodies (two eyes, mouth and nose) to emphasize the exclusivity of an all business class airline. Likewise the music is minimalist, quickly cutting to an a cappella recording of the Flower Duet, the use of the original opera version rather than a pop rerecording, again evoking the exclusivity of the airline. This ad was made by the makers of the original ad, then at M&C Saatchi, having lost the British Airways contract.

== See also ==
- Slaves Chorus, or Va, pensiero, from Nabucco, by Giuseppe Verdi, featured in many earlier 1980s BA adverts
