= Delphine Haidan =

French mezzo-soprano

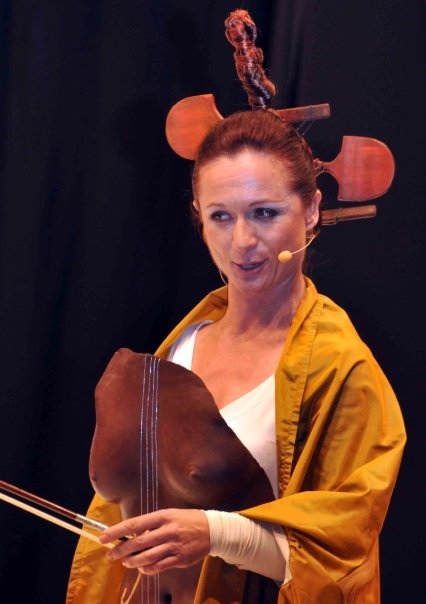
Delphine Haidan at the Salon du Chocolat 2009.

Delphine Haidan is a French mezzo-soprano who has performed internationally.

== Career ==
Haidan was received vocal training by choral conductor Jacques Grimbert. She achieved a Master's degree in musicology from the Sorbonne in Paris. She won an opera prize at the Conservatoire de Paris and several prizes of international singing competitions. She became a member of the studio (École d'art lyrique) of the Paris Opera, and then of the Opéra Bastille. She performed in Griegs Peer Gynt, conducted by Neeme Järvi, and in Stravinsky's Les noces. In 1998 she was nominated for a Victoires de la musique classique. The same year she performed and recorded the role of Mallika in Delibes' Lakmé alongside Natalie Dessay in the title role, conducted by Michel Plasson.

Her repertoire includes Baroque operas, and roles by Mozart and Rossini. She has performed with conductors including Charles Dutoit and James Colon in Paris, Kent Nagano in London and Nikolaus Harnoncourt in Vienna. She has performed at regional opera houses in France such as in Metz, Nantes, Rennes, Toulouse and at the Grand Théâtre de Bordeaux.
