= Hugh Hudson =

English film director (1936–2023)

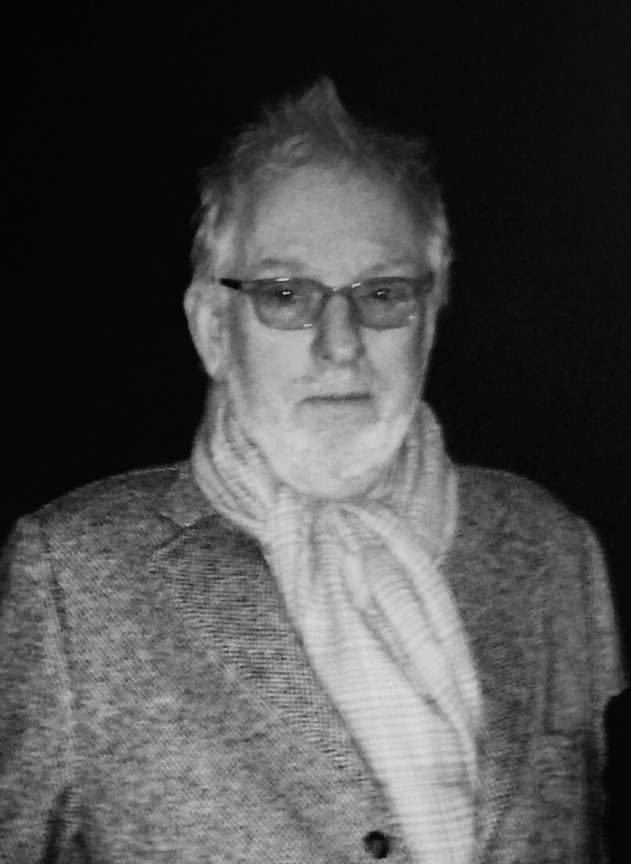
- Hudson in 2015
- Born: 25 August 1936; London, England
- Died: 10 February 2023 (aged 86); London, England
- Education: Eton College
- Occupations: Director; producer; screenwriter
- Years active: 1967–2023
- Known for: Chariots of Fire (1981); Greystoke (1984); Revolution (1985)
- Spouses: Susan Caroline Michie (m. 1977; div. 1995) Maryam d'Abo (m. 2003)
- Children: 1

Hugh Donaldson-Hudson, generally known as Hugh Hudson, (25 August 1936 – 10 February 2023) was an English film director. He is known for directing the 1981 Academy Award and BAFTA Award Best Picture Chariots of Fire, after beginning his career making documentaries and television commercials. He continued to direct commercials while making films, which included the British Airways face advertisement from 1989 made in collaboration with London-based advertising agency Saatchi & Saatchi.

Along with Adrian Lyne, Alan Parker, Ridley Scott, and Tony Scott, Hudson was part of the "Adland Five" of British directors operating in the late 1970s and early 1980s who first established themselves in the advertising world, before going on to Hollywood success. The group's influence has been cited by the likes of Christopher Nolan and Christopher Frayling.

== Early life and education ==
Hugh Hudson was born on in London, England, 25 August 1936. He was the son of Michael Donaldson-Hudson and Jacynth Mary Ellerton.

He first went to boarding school, and later attended Eton College.

Hudson began his National Service in the Dragoon Guards.

== Career ==
=== 1960s ===
In the 1960s, after three years of editing documentaries in Paris, Hudson headed a documentary film company with partners Robert Brownjohn and David Cammell. The company produced, among others, the documentaries A for Apple, which won a Screenwriters' Guild Award, and The Tortoise and the Hare, which was nominated for a BAFTA Award. The company emerged with much success in the 1960s, winning many awards and pioneering a new graphic style for documentary and advertising films.

Hudson then began a career in advertising, producing and directing many television commercials. He worked alongside Alan Parker, Ridley and Tony Scott for Ridley Scott Associates (RSA), a British film and commercial production company founded in 1968. His first filmmaking job was as a second-unit director on Parker's Midnight Express (1978).

=== 1970s–1980s ===
Between 1973 and 1975, Hudson wrote and directed Fangio, A life at 300 km/h, a documentary film about motor racing seen through the eyes of Juan Manuel Fangio, five times the world Formula One Champion.

From 1979 to 1980, Hudson directed his first and most successful feature film, Chariots of Fire (1981), the story of two British track runners, one a devout Christian and the other an ambitious Jew, in the run-up to the 1924 Olympic Games. The film is said to have revitalized the fading British film industry, and it won four Academy Awards, including Best Picture; Hudson earned a nomination for Best Director. His friend and colleague Vangelis created an Academy Award-winning score for the film. He also directed the 'Handbuilt by Robots' film about the construction of the Fiat Strada, mainly filmed whilst the factory was closed during a strike by workers.

Vincent Canby of the New York Times wrote in 1981 "It's to the credit of both Mr Hudson and Mr Welland that Chariots of Fire is simultaneously romantic and commonsensical, lyrical and comic. ... It's an exceptional film, about some exceptional people." In 2017, some 37 years after its showing at the 1981 Cannes Film Festival, it was shown to a large audience at the Classic Screenings beach cinema to help support the bid for the 2024 Olympic Games to be held in Paris.

Hudson had rejected numerous feature film offers before Chariots of Fire's success. His next production was Greystoke: The Legend of Tarzan, Lord of the Apes (1984) which received four Oscar nominations, and was Ralph Richardson's last screen performance, for which he was nominated in the 1985 Oscars as Best Supporting Actor. It was a success at the box office and with critics.

In 1985, Hudson directed Revolution, which depicted the American War of Independence, and which was released before it was a fully completed film. The film was a critical and commercial failure at the box office and earned Hudson a Golden Raspberry Award nomination for Worst Director.

Hudson's next theatrical feature film was Lost Angels (1989), nominated for the Palme d'Or at the 1989 Cannes Film Festival. The film was an American-based drama starring Donald Sutherland and Ad-Rock of the Beastie Boys and dealing with disaffected youth in California.

=== 1990s onward ===
In the early 1990s, David Lean named Hudson as a possible replacement director on Nostromo, his adaptation of Joseph Conrad's novel, which he never shot because he died beforehand. Hudson subsequently worked on the project for eight years, but it never saw the light of day. "It was an impossible film to make," he later said. "We tried, though, with French producer Serge Silberman. A silver mine and five characters, all destroyed in their search for the treasure it contains: Hollywood wasn't ready to finance that."

In 1999, Hudson directed My Life So Far. Jean-Claude Carrière wrote of it, "Hugh Hudson's film My Life So Far is a delightful bittersweet film, which covers the start of a boy's life during the first part of the 20th century – from his last baby's bottle to his first cigar. A film which sadly is not known as well as it should be. It is a variation on a universal theme which will never end. There will always be men and women, old people and youngsters, horses and dogs." Hudson next directed I Dreamed of Africa (2000), which was the closing film of the Cannes Film Festival of that year.

In 2006, Hudson was reported to be working, together with producer John Heyman, on an historical epic based on the life of the monotheistic Egyptian Pharaoh Akhenaten and his wife Nefertiti. The film was to center around their tempestuous relationship.

In 2008, Hudson re-edited Revolution, giving the film a narration by Al Pacino. The Observer film critic Philip French writing about the new version said, "Revolution was misunderstood and unjustly treated on its first appearance twenty years ago. Seeing it again in the director's slightly revised version it now strikes me as a masterpiece – profound, poetic and original. Hudson's film should take its place among the great movies about history and about individual citizens living in times of dramatic social change. One hopes it will finally find the wide audience it deserves."

In 2009, he was in active development on Catalonia, a drama set against the backdrop of the Spanish Civil War based on George Orwell's memoirs, and was preparing to shoot it the next year. Described as a "three-sided story", the film was to have starred Colin Firth as Orwell, alongside Geoffrey Rush and an unknown female actress.

Hudson co-produced Chariots of Fire, the 2012 stage adaptation of the film of the same title. The stage adaptation was his idea, for the London Olympic year. Also in 2012, it was announced that Hudson would direct Midnight Sun, a feature film about a child who tries to help a family of polar bears on the shrinking polar ice cap. Hudson co-wrote the script as well. The script became The Journey Home with directors Roger Spottiswoode and Brando Quilici replacing Hudson.

In 2016, he staged his debut as an opera director with Robert Ward’s setting of The Crucible at the Staatstheater Braunschweig. The sets and painted backdrops were designed by British artist Brian Clarke. The second run of the opera was to sold-out audiences.

In 2016, Hudson directed the period drama Altamira, about the discovery of the famous Spanish cave paintings. The film stars Antonio Banderas and Rupert Everett. The New York Times gave the film a glowing review. Released in two U.S. cities the film then was distributed by Netflix in USA/Canada and Sky in the UK. The Spanish release was very successful.

== Advertisements ==
In 1988, Hudson directed a 2½-minute advertisement for British Rail, in the style of, and in homage to, the Post Office Film Unit's 25-minute documentary Night Mail, which was made in 1936. Poet W. H. Auden had written verse specifically to fit the original 1936 film's footage, which showed the enormous scale of BR's daily operation and the structure of the 'sectorised' business. The opening sequence of Hudson's British Rail advert features the northbound Travelling Post Office with Auden's original verse, narrated by Sir Tom Courtenay.

Some of the many other acclaimed advertisements created by Hudson include the 1989 British Airways "Face" advert seen in over 80 countries around the world and running for almost a decade; the 1979 Fiat Strada Figaro advert; and the Benson & Hedges "Swimming Pool" and "Salvage" adverts . In 2007 he created his Silverjet advert, a direct parody of his own 1989 British Airways advert. He also created the Courage Best "Gercha" advert and the Cinzano "Aeroplane" advert. Hudson also directed Kinnock – The Movie (1987), an election broadcast for the British Labour Party.

== Recognition, honours, and awards ==
In 2003, Hudson was given a special Cannes Lions award on the 50th Anniversary of the Cannes Lions International Advertising Festival, an award given only to directors who have won the Grand Prix more than once. Hudson won Grand Prix Cannes Lions awards for his 1972 Levi's "Walking Behinds" and 1978 Coty L'Aimant "French Lesson" adverts.

In August 2007, in Nîmes, France, "Un Realisateur dans la Ville", a festival created by Gérard Depardieu and Jean-Claude Carrière to showcase each year the work of one director, featured the work of Hudson.

In October 2008, at the Dinard British Film Festival, Hudson's work was honoured. As a tribute five of his films were shown, with My Life So Far opening the festival.

He also headed many film festival juries.

=== International awards ===
International awards received by Hudson include:

- 1981: Cannes Golden Palm – nomination – Chariots of Fire
- 1981: Toronto Audience Award – Chariots of Fire
- 1982: Academy Awards – Chariots of Fire – Best Picture; nomination as Best Director and 6 others
- 1982: Golden Globe – Best Foreign Film
- 1982: BAFTA – Best Picture. Chariots of Fire
- 1985. Academy Awards 4 Nominations – supporting actor. script. make up fxs.
- 1985: BFI – Technical achievement award – Greystoke
- 1985: Cesar Awards – nomination, Best Foreign Film – Greystoke
- 1985: Venice Film Festival Lion d'Or – nomination – Greystoke
- 1986: Golden Raspberry Award – Revolution – nomination as Worst Director
- 1989: Palme d'Or at Cannes Film Festival – nomination, Lost Angels
- 2000: Cannes Festival 2000 – nominated closing film – I Dreamed of Africa
- 2005: Taormina Festival – award for Cinematic Art
- 2007: Cairo Film Festival – Silver Pyramid Award
- 2009 Prague Film Festival – Special award for contribution to cinematic art
- 2014 Bulgaria Sofia Film Festival . Award for contribution to cinema.
- 2017 FEST film festival, Serbia – Belgrade Victor for Outstanding Contribution to Film Art

== Personal life and death ==
Hudson's maternal half-brother was noted musicologist John Warrack.

His first marriage in 1977 was with painter Susan Michie, with whom he had a son, Thomas John Hudson. In November 2003, Hudson married actress Maryam d'Abo, and they remained married until his death.

When asked in an interview about the long gaps in his filmography, Hudson answered, "I've worked on projects that I've wanted to do and they didn't happen [...] There are films I would have loved to have made. I think I am satisfied with what I'm doing. Next film I make my voice will come back again."

Hudson died at Charing Cross Hospital in London on 10 February 2023. He was 86.

== Filmography ==
Year	Title	Director	Writer	Producer
1981	Chariots of Fire	Yes	No	No
1984	Greystoke: The Legend of Tarzan, Lord of the Apes	Yes	No	Yes
1985	Revolution	Yes	No	No
1989	Lost Angels	Yes	No	No
1995	Lumière and Company	Partial	No	No
1999	My Life So Far	Yes	No	No
2000	I Dreamed of Africa	Yes	No	No
2014	The Journey Home	No	Uncredited	No
2016	Altamira	Yes	No	No
2022	The Tiger's Nest	No	Yes	No

Documentary film

Year	Title	Director	Producer
1981	Fangio: Una vita a 300 all'ora	Yes	Executive
2012	Rupture: Living With My Broken Brain	Yes	Yes

Unrealised directorial projects

- an adaptation of The October Circle (1975) starring Ian Holm, Dirk Bogarde, Simone Signoret, Richard Attenborough, Sean Connery and Richard Burton
- Reversal of Fortune (1987)
- Fat Man and Little Boy (1988)
- Josephine (1989), a musical biopic of Josephine Baker
- an adaptation of Nostromo (1993) starring Alec Baldwin
- The Women of Valor (2001), a WWII drama starring an international cast
- Harder They Fall (2004), a film about a rugby player
- an adaptation of Moses and Akhenaten: The Secret History of Egypt at the Time of the Exodus (2005)
- an adaptation of Homage to Catalonia (2008) starring Colin Firth and Kevin Spacey
- Midnight Sun (2012)
- Forbidden City (2013), a film set between Venice and China in the 15th century
- a biopic of Billy McClain (2017)
