= Esther Freud =

British novelist (born 1963)

Esther Freud FRSL
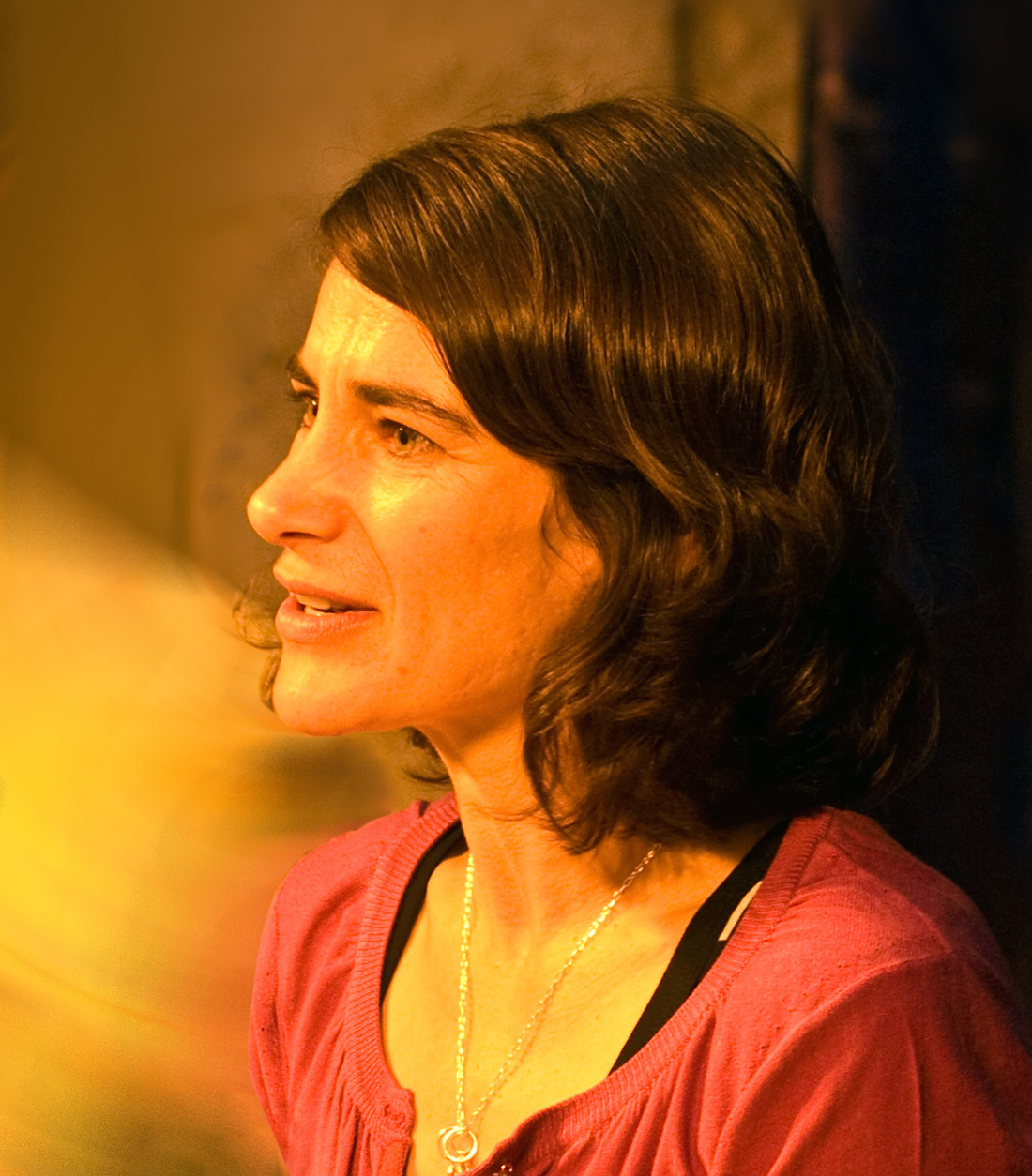
- Freud in 2008
- Born: 1963 (age 62–63); London, England
- Occupation: Novelist
- Years active: 1984–present
- Spouse: David Morrissey (m. 2006; sep. 2020)
- Children: 3
- Father: Lucian Freud
- Family: Freud

Esther Freud (born 1963) is a British novelist, known for her autobiographical novel Hideous Kinky (1992). She is the daughter of the painter Lucian Freud.

== Early life and education ==
Born in London in 1963, Freud is the daughter of Bernardine Coverley, daughter of Irish Catholic parents and painter Lucian Freud. She is also a great-granddaughter of Sigmund Freud and niece of Clement Freud.

She travelled extensively with her mother as a child, returning to London at 16 to train as an actress at The Drama Centre.

== Career ==
She has worked in television and theatre as both actress and writer. Her first credited television appearance was as a terrified diner in The Bill in 1984, running frantically out of a Chinese restaurant after it had received a bomb scare. A year later, she appeared as an alien in the Doctor Who serial Attack of the Cybermen. Her novels include the semi-autobiographical Hideous Kinky, which was adapted into a film starring Kate Winslet.

She is also the author of The Wild, Gaglow, and The Sea House. She also wrote the foreword for The Summer Book by Tove Jansson.

Freud was named as one of the 20 "Best of Young British Novelists" by Granta magazine in 1993. Her novels have been translated into 13 languages. She is also the co-founder (with Kitty Aldridge) of the women's theatre company Norfolk Broads.

In 2009, she donated the short story Rice Cakes and Starbucks to Oxfam's 'Ox-Tales' project, four collections of UK stories written by 38 authors. Her story was published in the 'Water' collection. As of 2014, Freud taught at the Faber Academy.

Freud was elected a Fellow of the Royal Society of Literature in 2019.

== Personal life ==
Freud has a sister, fashion designer Bella Freud, and a half-brother, Noah Woodman. Her uncle was politician Sir Clement Freud. She has two cousins in the media industry: public relations executive Matthew and broadcaster Emma. Her parents died within four days of each other, in July 2011.

She was married to actor David Morrissey, with whom she has three children, Albie, Anna and Gene. They married in 2006. They had separated by 2020, when Freud began living with a boyfriend. Freud maintains homes in London and Walberswick near Southwold in Suffolk as of 2015.

Freud's maternal grandparents were Catholics but her mother was non-observant, while her father's Jewish family were atheists. She identifies as Jewish.

== Bibliography ==
=== Novels ===
- Hideous Kinky (1992)
- Peerless Flats (1993)
- Summer at Gaglow (1998)
- The Wild (2000)
- The Sea House (2003)
- Love Falls (2007)
- Lucky Break (2010)
- Mr Mac and Me (2014)
- I Couldn't Love You More (2021)
- My Sister and Other Lovers (2025)
- Enchanted Beach (2025)

=== Plays ===
- Stitchers (2018)

=== Short fiction ===
Stories

Title	Year	First published	Reprinted/collected	Notes
Desire	2021	Freud, Esther (27 September 2021). "Desire". The New Yorker. 97 (30): 72–78.		

== See also ==
- Freud family
