= Marie van Zandt =

American opera singer (1858–1919)

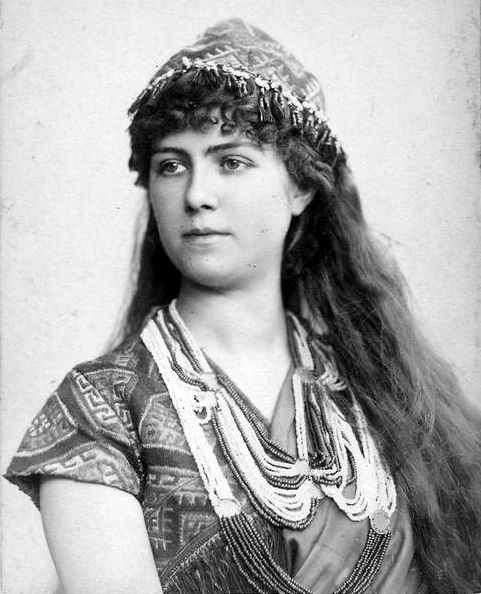
Marie van Zandt

Marie van Zandt (October 8, 1858 – December 31, 1919) was an American coloratura soprano.

== Early years ==
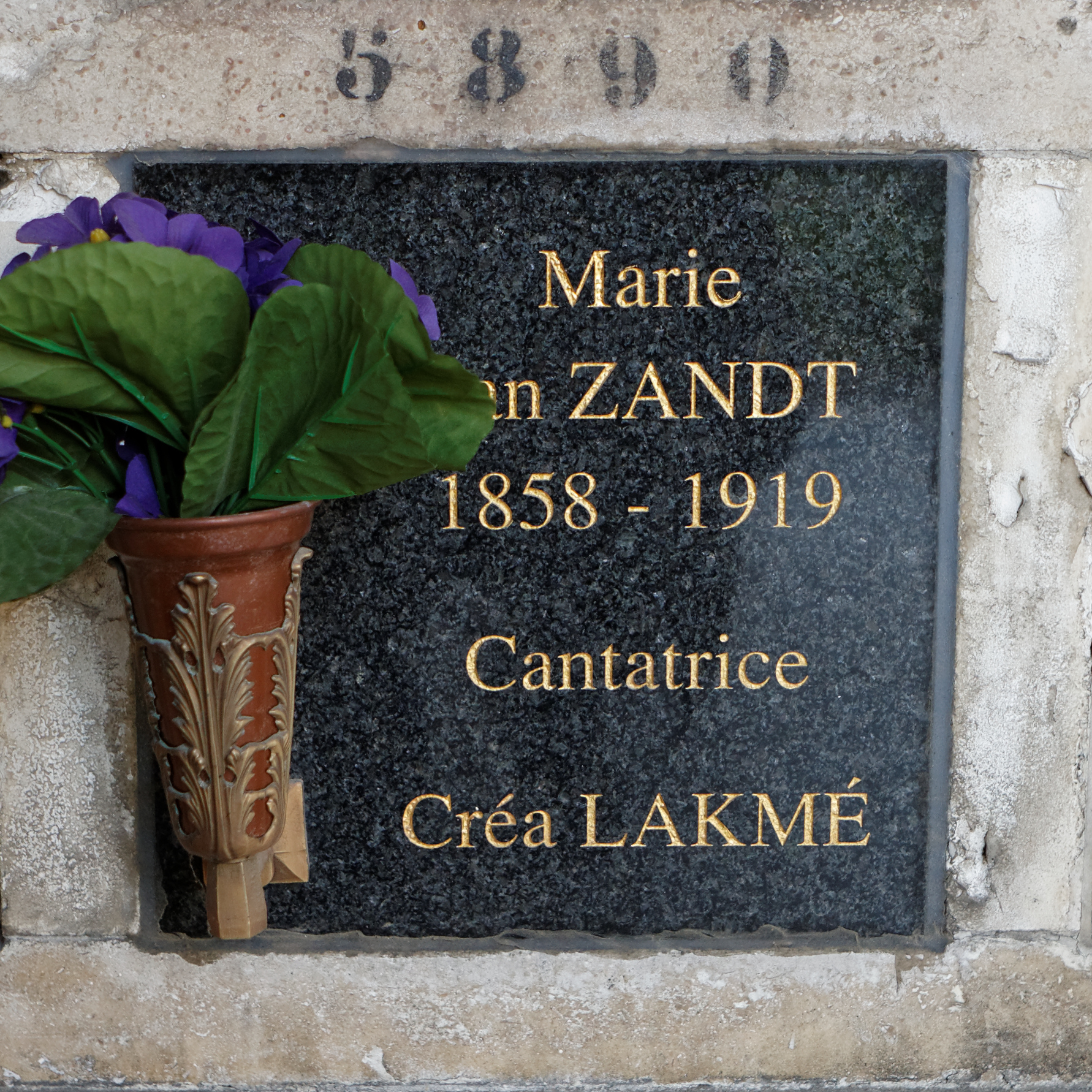
Urn-grave, Père Lachaise Cemetery, Paris

Born in New York City, van Zandt was the daughter of Jennie van Zandt, who had sung at La Scala and at New York's Academy of Music. She studied in Milan with Francesco Lamperti, making her debut as Zerlina in Don Giovanni in Turin in 1879.

== Career ==
Successful appearances followed her debut, including at Covent Garden in 1879. However, at that time, it was necessary to make official debuts in Paris. So she left for Paris in 1880 where her mother, who had acquaintances in Parisian high society, managed to introduce her daughter to professionals.

Van Zandt, who was only 21, signed a contract with the Opéra-Comique in 1880, making her debut as Mignon. Léo Delibes composed his opera Lakmé for her, and she created the title role for its world premiere in 1883, with Elisa Frandin playing Malika. Organized opposition at the Opéra-Comique was created at around this time in an attempt to discredit her; among the false accusations that were circulated was one suggesting that she appeared onstage while drunk. Nevertheless, she assumed a successful career, and the Parisian beau monde praised her, as for example Baron Alphonse de Rothschild who used to reserve loges for his family and friends when she appeared on stage. She travelled all around Europe for tours.

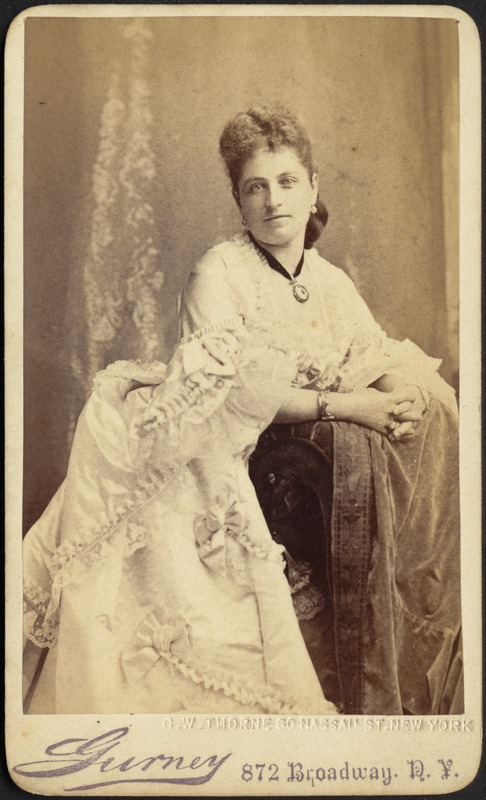
Marie van Zandt, [ca. 1859–1870]. Carte de Visite Collection, Boston Public Library.

Van Zandt made her Metropolitan Opera debut as Amina in Vincenzo Bellini's La sonnambula on December 21, 1891, remaining with the company for only one season. She returned to the Opéra-Comique in 1896 and revived some of her earlier success there, including Lakmé to huge enthusiasm in 1896, and Zerlina and Mignon in 1897. It was (falsely) reported that she would be appearing in March 1897 in the premiere of Massenet's Cendrillon. She was a good friend of Jules Massenet and used to sing for Parisian aristocratic salons, for example at Mme Lemaire's hôtel particulier, where Massenet, Marcel Proust, Countess Greffulhe, Camille Saint-Saëns, Reynaldo Hahn, etc. were frequent guests.

She married a Russian Count and went into retirement, staying in France.

Van Zandt died in Cannes in 1919 at age 61. Her ashes are at the Père Lachaise Cemetery in Paris.
