= The Journey Home (2014 film) =

- Film poster with the title The Journey Home
- Directed by: Roger Spottiswoode; Brando Quilici
- Written by: Bart Gavigan; Hugh Hudson; Brando Quilici
- Produced by: Rob Heydon; Karine Martin; Brando Quilici
- Starring: Dakota Goyo; Goran Višnjić; Bridget Moynahan; Linda Kash; Kendra Leigh Timmins; Peter MacNeill; Duane Murray; Pezoo
- Cinematography: Peter Wunstorf
- Edited by: Pia Di Ciaula
- Music by: Lawrence Shragge
- Production companies: Hyde Park Entertainment; Original Pictures; Image Nation
- Distributed by: Entertainment One; Image Entertainment
- Release dates: November 13, 2014 (Italy); September 4, 2015 (Canada)
- Running time: 98 minutes
- Countries: Canada; Italy
- Language: English

The Journey Home (originally titled Midnight Sun) is a 2014 family adventure-drama film starring Dakota Goyo, Goran Višnjić, and Bridget Moynahan, written by Hugh Hudson, directed by Roger Spottiswoode and Brando Quilici. Filmed on location in Ontario and Manitoba, Canada, it follows Luke Mercier, a local teenager (Goyo), who works to reunite lost polar bear cub Nanuk with its mother. It premiered in November 2014, and received generally mixed-to-positive reviews.

== Plot ==
Luke Mercier, a local teenager, defies nature to reunite an abandoned polar bear cub Nanuk with its mother in the ice fields of Northern Canada.

== Cast ==
- Dakota Goyo as Luke Mercier
- Goran Višnjić as Muktuk
- Bridget Moynahan as Madison Mercier
- Duane Murray as Jake Murdoch
- Peter MacNeill as Albert Speck
- Kendra Leigh Timmins as Abbie Mercier
- Linda Kash as Aunt Rita
- Michelle Thrush as Eta
- Russell Yuen as Doctor
- Pezoo as Nanuk
