= Théodore Pavie =

French writer

Théodore Marie Pavie
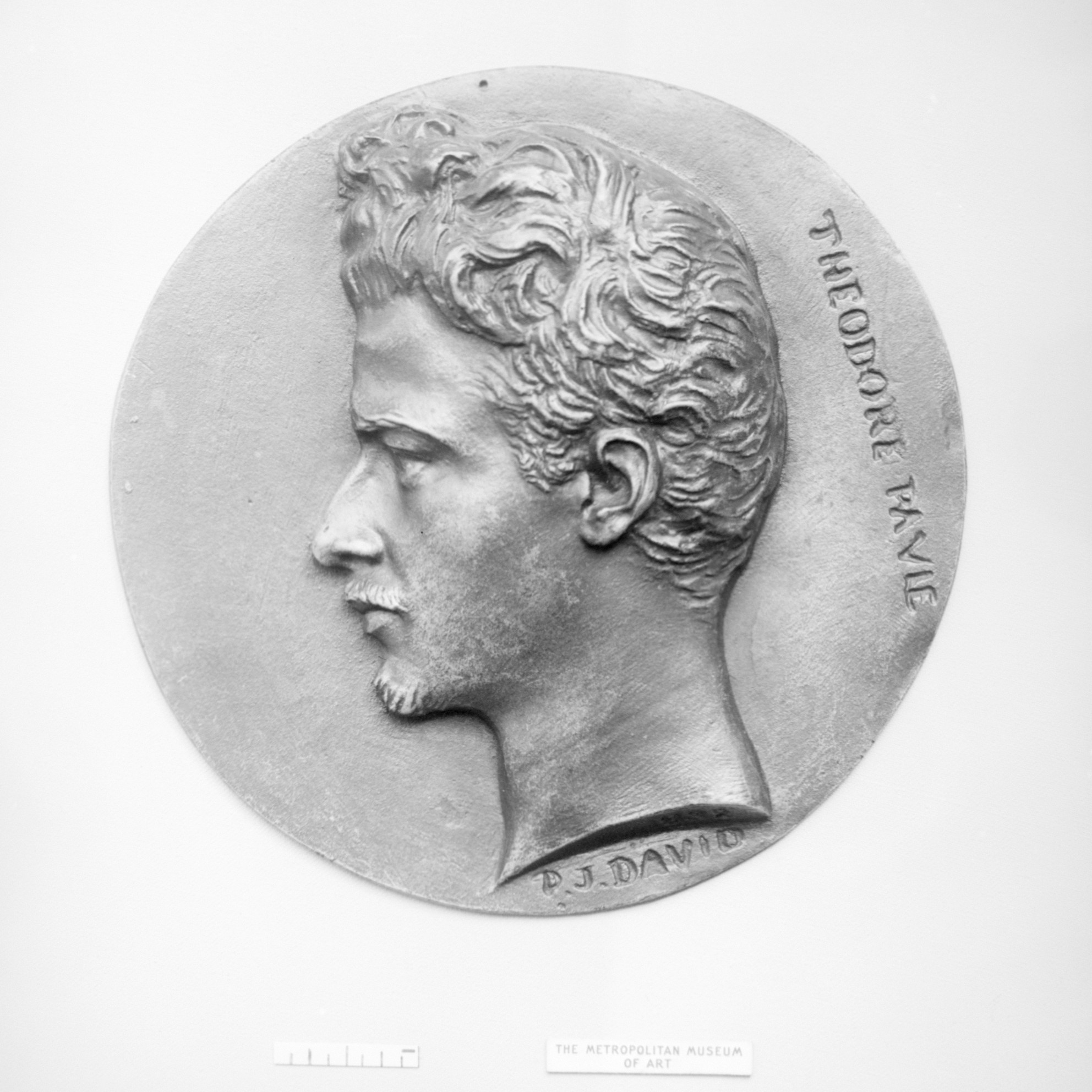
- Born: 16 August 1811; Angers
- Died: 5 January 1896 (aged 84)
- Education: Collège Royal d’Angers

Théodore Pavie (16 August 1811 – 5 January 1896) was a traveler and writer born in Angers, France. He spoke nine languages, including German, Hebrew, Arabic, Hindustani, Chinese, and Manchu.
He is best known for his contributions to journals, including Revue des Deux Mondes.

Pavie used the journal as source material for a two-volume book entitled "Souvenirs Atlantiques." On the recommendation of Victor Hugo, Pavie printed 500 copies of the work.

He was a student of Eugène Burnouf at the College Royal d'Angers. After his teacher's death, he took over the Sanskrit teaching position in 1852. He later spent 40 years in his small château in Anjou.

He also contributed to the local Angers newspaper.

== Biography ==
Théodore Pavie was born in Angers on 16 August 1811. His father Louis Joseph Pavie, a printer from Angevin, raised Victor and Théodore after their mother Eulalie Fabre died. He married Cornélie Mondain Gennevraye in 1842, and had no children. He later resigned from teaching Sanskrit at the Collège de France due to the conditions imposed by the Minister of Public Instruction. In 1862, Théodore retired and gave Hebrew lessons and lectures at Catholic Faculties in Angers. After losing his brother Victor in 1866 and his wife Cornélie (1894), he died on 5 January 1896.

== Publications ==
=== Book ===
- Souvenirs atlantiques (1832)

=== Novel ===
- Le Lazo (1833)

=== Magazine ===
- Revue des Deux Mondes

=== Journals ===
- Artist
- Journal of Anjou
