= Hideous Kinky =

1992 book by Esther Freud

- First edition
- Author: Esther Freud
- Cover artist: Lucian Freud
- Language: English
- Genre: Autobiographical novel
- Publisher: Hamish Hamilton
- Publication date: 30 January 1992
- Publication place: United Kingdom
- Media type: Print (hardback & paperback)
- Pages: 192 pp
- ISBN: 0-241-13179-0
- OCLC: 24796175

Hideous Kinky is an autobiographical novel by Esther Freud, daughter of British painter Lucian Freud and Bernardine Coverley and great-granddaughter of Sigmund Freud. It depicts the author's unconventional childhood in Morocco with her mother and her elder sister, Bea. In 1998, a film adaptation was released.

== Plot summary ==
A young mother and her two daughters travel to Marrakesh, Morocco, during the 1960s. The mother is disenchanted by the dreary conventions of English life, hence the journey. They live in a low-rent Marrakesh hotel and make a living out of sewing dresses and receive money sent by the girls' father in London.

Whilst the mother explores Sufism and quests for personal fulfilment, the daughters rebel. The elder, Bea, attempting to re-create her English life, wants to get an education and insists on going to school. The younger dreams of trivial things, like mashed potatoes, but also yearns for a father. Her hopes settle on a most unlikely candidate.

The girls’ mother meets a series of men including Bilal, a Moroccan acrobat; he moves in, becoming almost a surrogate father. When he leaves town the mother travels to Algiers without Bea, to study with a Sufi master.

== Adaptations ==
In 1998, the novel was adapted into a film of the same name, directed by Gillies MacKinnon.

== Release details ==
- 1992, UK, Hamish Hamilton ISBN 0-241-13179-0, Pub date 30 January 1992, hardback (First edition)
- 1992, USA, Harcourt ISBN 0-15-140216-7, Pub date 1 July 1992, hardback
- 1993, UK, Penguin Books ISBN 0-14-017412-5, Pub date 25 February 1993, paperback
- 1998, USA, W.W. Norton ISBN 0-88001-593-4, Pub date ? April 1998, paperback
- 1999, UK, CSA Word ISBN 1-901768-20-1, Pub date ? January 1999, Audio book cassette (narrated by Esther Freud)
- 1999, USA, ScreenPress Books ISBN 1-901680-25-8, Pub date 11 March 1999, paperback (Film screenplay)
