= Dakota Goyo =

Canadian actor

- Born: Dakota Avery Goyo; August 22, 1999 (age 27); Toronto, Ontario, Canada
- Occupation: Actor
- Years active: 2005–2014

Dakota Avery Goyo (born August 22, 1999) is a Canadian former actor. He played Max Kenton in the film Real Steel (2011) and Jesse Barrett in the film Dark Skies (2013). He also voices Jamie Bennett in the DreamWorks Animation film Rise of the Guardians (2012).

== Early life ==
Goyo was born to Debra, a former model and singer who manages his career, and David Goyo. He has two older brothers, Devon and Dallas.

== Career ==
Goyo appeared in his first commercial as an infant, after which he landed various roles in television and animation series. His featured television work includes Disney's JoJo's Circus in 2005, Ultra in 2006, Super Why! in 2008, Murdoch Mysteries in 2008, The Listener in 2009, My Neighbor's Secret in 2009, Happy Town in 2010 and a recurring role as Timmy Tibble on the children's television series Arthur in 2010.

Goyo completed a series lead role in the ABC pilot Solving Charlie in 2009, playing Charlie, an orphaned child who has an IQ of 190 and helps his long-lost brother, an aspiring detective, to solve crimes. Goyo played Teddy, the son of Josh Hartnett's character, in the 2007 film Resurrecting the Champ and played Timmy, grandson of Susan Sarandon's character, in the 2007 film Emotional Arithmetic.

In 2011, Goyo starred in Real Steel as Max Kenton, the estranged son of Charlie Kenton (Hugh Jackman), and also played young Thor in the superhero film Thor. In 2012, Goyo voiced Jamie in the DreamWorks Animation feature Rise of the Guardians, and in 2013, he starred in the science fiction thriller film Dark Skies.

== Filmography ==
=== Film ===
Year	Title	Role	Notes
2007	Resurrecting the Champ	Teddy Kernan	Nominated- Young Artist Award - Best Performance in a Feature Film – Young Actor Age Ten or Younger
2007	Emotional Arithmetic	Timmy Winters	
2009	Defendor	Jack Carter-9	
2011	Real Steel	Max Kenton	Young Artist Award - Best Performance in a Feature Film – Leading Young Actor; Nominated-Best Performance by a Younger Actor
2011	Thor	Young Thor	
2012	Rise of the Guardians	Jamie Bennett (voice)	
2013	Dark Skies	Jesse Barrett	
2014	The Journey Home	Luke	
2014	Noah	Young Noah	

=== Television ===
Year	Title	Role	Notes
2005	JoJo's Circus	Little Blue (voice)	Episode: "The Thanksgiving Parade"
2006	Ultra	Brett	Also producer and stunts
2009	Solving Charlie	Charlie Hudson II	
2009	Super Why!	Little Boy (voice)	Episode: "Twas the Night Before Christmas"
2009	The Listener	Nicki	Episode: "I'm an Adult"; Also stunts
2009	Murdoch Mysteries	Alwyn Jones	3 episodes
2009	My Neighbor's Secret	Austin Hest	Also stunts
2010	Happy Town	Young Tommy Conroy	Episode: "Questions and Antlers"
2010	Arthur	Timmy Tibble (voice)	4 episodes
2011	The Haunting Hour: The Series	Josh	Episode: "Flight" Nominated-Outstanding Performer in a Children's Series; Nominated-Best Performance in a TV Series – Guest Starring Young Actor 11–13

== Awards and nominations ==
Award	Year	Category	Result	Work
Young Artist Award	2008	Best Performance in a Feature Film – Young Actor Age Ten or Younger	Nominated	Resurrecting the Champ
Young Artist Award	2012	Best Performance in a Feature Film – Leading Young Actor	Won	Real Steel
Young Artist Award	2012	Best Performance in a TV Series – Guest Starring Young Actor 11–13	Nominated	R.L. Stine's The Haunting Hour
Saturn Awards	2012	Best Performance by a Younger Actor	Nominated	Real Steel
Daytime Emmy Awards	2012	Outstanding Performer in a Children's Series	Nominated	R.L. Stine's The Haunting Hour
