= Brando Quilici =

Italian film director

Brando Quilici is an independent Italian filmmaker whose career spans over two decades. He has worked on many specials for American networks including the National geographic channel, Discovery Channel, and PBS Nova, as well as European networks including Channel 4, ZDF, France 5, and Rai.

He has won many awards, including prizes at the Jackson Hole Film Festival and Trento Film Festival.

In 2013 Brando, with Academy Award-winning producer Jake Ebert, produced The Journey Home a family action-adventure feature film set among the ice fields of the Canadian Arctic. Directed by Roger Spottiswoode (Tomorrow Never Dies) and Brando Quilici, the film stars Dakota Goyo (Real Steel), Goran Visnjic (“ER”) and Bridget Moynahan (Blue Bloods). written by the Academy Award winner Hugh Hudson. The film is now available on all major US Digital Accounts and DVD, and distributed theatrically in over 35 countries.
