= Rupture: Living With My Broken Brain =

2012 United Kingdom documentary film

Rupture: Living With My Broken Brain is a 2012 United Kingdom documentary film created by former actress Maryam d'Abo, directed by Hugh Hudson and narrated by Nigel Havers. The film follows the experiences of d'Abo and others as they deal with the repercussions of various forms of brain damage.

== History ==
In 2007 D'Abo suffered a brain haemorrhage and underwent brain surgery. After her recovery she began collecting information about various types of brain injuries and interviewing people who had experienced them. Among those interviewed were former newspaper editor Robert McCrum, jazz guitarist Pat Martino and music producer Quincy Jones. The film's scientific advisor and scriptwriter was Paul Broks, a lecturer in psychology at Plymouth University.

With her husband, Oscar-winning director Hugh Hudson and with narration by Nigel Havers, the film was produced in 2011 and 2012. The original title was planned to be "Rupture - A Matter of Life or Death".

== Screenings ==
In July 2012 the film was shown on BBC Four television as part of the series Flesh, Blood and Bone: The Amazing Human Body. It was screened at several film festivals in Europe. In September 2016 the film was shown as part of the TVOntario series Science Singles in Canada.

== Critical reception ==
The film was generally well received. D'Abo's interviewing style and the variety of personal experiences included were praised; the technical quality of the film and detours in the script into philosophical topics were criticized.
