= Dôme épais le jasmin =

Aria from Léo Delibes's opera Lakmé

"Flower Duet" (1:25)

"Dôme épais le jasmin" ("Thick dome of jasmine"), often referred to as the "Flower Duet" (French: Duo des fleurs), is a duet for soprano and mezzo-soprano in the first act of the tragic opera Lakmé, composed by Léo Delibes and premiered in Paris in 1883.

It is sung by the characters Lakmé, daughter of a Brahmin priest, and her servant Mallika, as they go to gather flowers by a river.

The duet is frequently used in advertisements and films and is popular as a concert piece. The duet has become a staple of British Airways' brand image, having first been adapted for the track "Aria" in the airline's "face" advertisements of the 1980s by Yanni and Malcolm McLaren. It has been featured in many subsequent advertisements for the airline and is used as its inflight boarding music. More recently, it has been heard in bits by The Kids In The Hall and Astron-6, and as soundtrack in films such as Carlito's Way, I've Heard the Mermaids Singing, The Hunger, Meet the Parents, Anomalisa, Lara Croft: Tomb Raider – The Cradle of Life, Piranha 3D, The Angry Birds Movie, The Occupant and True Romance; and television shows including Sex and the City, Regular Show, Parks and Recreation, Dark Winds, and The Simpsons.

== Music ==
The duet's time signature is 6/8; its key is B major, except for the part "Mais, je ne sais" until "les lotus bleus," which is in G major. That part has a slightly faster tempo (=160) than the surrounding lines (=144). The final reprise is in the original key and tempo. A performance takes about six minutes.

== Lyrics ==
French lyrics
Lakmé: Viens, Mallika, les lianes en fleurs
Jettent déjà leur ombre
Sur le ruisseau sacré
qui coule, calme et sombre,
Eveillé par le chant des oiseaux tapageurs.

Mallika: Oh! maîtresse, c'est l'heure
où je te vois sourire,
L'heure bénie où je puis lire
Dans le coeur toujours fermé
De Lakmé!

Lakmé: Dôme épais le jasmin
Mallika: Sous le dôme épais où le blanc jasmin

L.: À la rose s'assemble,
M.: À la rose s'assemble,

L.: Rive en fleurs, frais matin,
M.: Sur la rive en fleurs, riant au matin,

L.: Nous appellent ensemble.
M.: Viens, descendons ensemble.

L.: Ah! glissons en suivant
M.: Doucement glissons; De son flot charmant

L.: Le courant fuyant;
M.: Suivons le courant fuyant;

L.: Dans l'onde frémissante,
M.: Dans l’onde frémissante,

L.: D'une main nonchalante,
M.: D’une main nonchalante,

L.: Gagnons le bord,
M.: Viens, gagnons le bord

L.: Où l'oiseau chante,
M.: Où la source dort.

L.: l'oiseau, l'oiseau chante.
M.: Et l’oiseau, l’oiseau chante.

L.: Dôme épais, blanc jasmin,
M.: Sous le dôme épais, Sous le blanc jasmin,

L.: Nous appellent ensemble!
M.: Ah! descendons ensemble!

L.: Mais, je ne sais quelle crainte subite
s’empare de moi.
Quand mon père va seul à leur ville maudite,
Je tremble, je tremble d'effroi!

M.: Pour que le Dieu Ganeça le protège,
Jusqu'à l'étang où s'ébattent joyeux
Les cygnes aux ailes de neige,
Allons cueillir les lotus bleus.

L.: Oui, près des cygnes aux ailes de neige,
Allons cueillir les lotus bleus.

L: Dôme épais le jasmin
M: Sous le dôme épais où le blanc jasmin

L.: À la rose s'assemble,
M.: À la rose s'assemble,

L.: Rive en fleurs, frais matin,
M.: Sur la rive en fleurs, riant au matin,

L.: Nous appellent ensemble.
M.: Viens, descendons ensemble.

L.: Ah! glissons en suivant
M.: Doucement glissons; De son flot charmant

L.: Le courant fuyant;
M.: Suivons le courant fuyant;

L.: Dans l'onde frémissante,
M.: Dans l’onde frémissante,

L.: D'une main nonchalante,
M.: D’une main nonchalante,

L.: Gagnons le bord,
M.: Viens, gagnons le bord

L.: Où l'oiseau chante,
M.: Où la source dort.

L.: l'oiseau, l'oiseau chante.
M.: Et l’oiseau, l’oiseau chante.

L.: Dôme épais, blanc jasmin,
M.: Sous le dôme épais, où le blanc jasmin

L.: Nous appellent ensemble!
M.: Ah! descendons ensemble!

Literal English
Come, Mallika, the flowering lianas
already cast their shadow
on the sacred stream
which flows, calm and dark,
awakened by the song of rowdy birds.

Oh! Mistress, this is the hour
when I see you smile,
the blessed hour when I can read
in the always closed heart
of Lakmé!

Thick dome of jasmine
Under the dense canopy where the white jasmine,

Blends with the rose,
That blends with the rose,

Bank in bloom, fresh morning,
On the flowering bank, laughing in the morning,

Call us together.
Come, let us drift down together.

Ah! Let's glide along
Let us gently glide along; For its enchanting flow

The fleeing current;
Let us follow the fleeing current;

On the rippling surface,
On the rippling surface,

With a nonchalant hand,
With a nonchalant hand,

Let's go to the shore,
Come, let's go to the shore

Where the bird sings,
Where the spring sleeps.

the bird, the bird sings.
And the bird, the bird sings.

Thick dome, white jasmine,
Under the dense canopy, Under the white jasmine,

Call us together!
Ah! Let's drift down together!

But, an eerie feeling of distress
overcomes me.
When my father goes into their accursed city
I tremble, I tremble with fright!

In order for him to be protected by Ganesh
To the pond where joyfully play
The snow-winged swans
Let us pick blue lotuses.

Yes, near the swans with wings of snow,
Let us pick blue lotuses.

Thick dome of jasmine
Under the dense canopy where the white jasmine,

Blends with the rose,
That blends with the rose,

Bank in bloom, fresh morning,
On the flowering bank, laughing in the morning,

Call us together.
Come, let us drift down together.

Ah! Let's glide along
Let us gently glide along; For its enchanting flow

The fleeing current;
Let us follow the fleeing current;

On the rippling surface,
On the rippling surface,

With a nonchalant hand,
With a nonchalant hand,

Let's go to the shore,
Come, let's go to the shore

Where the bird sings,
Where the spring sleeps.

the bird, the bird sings.
And the bird, the bird sings.

Thick dome, white jasmine,
Under the dense canopy, Under the white jasmine,

Together call us!
Ah! Let's drift down together!

Singable English
Come, Mallika, the flowering vines
Their shadows now are throwing
Along the sacred stream,
That calmly here is flowing;
Enlivened by the songs of birds among the pines.

O mistress, dear! 't is now –
When I behold you smiling,
In this blest hour, no cares beguiling,
That your oft-closed heart I may read,
Lakmé!

'Neath the dome, the jasmine
'Neath the leafy dome, where the jasmine white

To the roses comes greeting,
To the roses comes greeting,

By flower banks, fresh and bright,
On the flow'rd bank, gay in morning light,

Come, and join we their meeting.
Come, and join we their meeting.

Ah! we'll glide with the tide,
Slowly on we'll glide floating with the tide,

On we'll ride away;
On the stream we'll ride away;

Through wavelets shimm'ring brightly,
Through wavelets shimm'ring brightly,

Carelessly rowing lightly,
Carelessly rowing lightly,

Reach we the steeps
We'll reach soon the steeps

Where the birds warble,
Where the fountain sleeps.

warble, the birds sprightly.
Where warble the birds sprightly.

'Neath the dome rowers unite,
'Neath the leafy dome, where the jasmine white,

Come and join we their meeting!
Come and join we their meeting!

But, why my heart's swift terror invested,
Doth not yet appear,
When my father 'lone goes to your city detested,
I tremble, I tremble with fear.

May the god, Ganesa, keep him from dangers,
Till he arrives at the pool just in view,
Where wild swans, those snowy wing'd strangers,
Come to devour the lotus blue.

Yes, where the wild swans, those snowy wing'd strangers,
Come to feed on lotus blue.

'Neath the dome, jasmines white
'Neath the leafy dome, where the jasmine white

To the roses comes greeting,
To the roses comes greeting,

By flower banks, fresh and bright,
On the flow'rd bank, gay in morning light,

Come, and join we their meeting.
Come, and join we their meeting.

Ah! we'll glide with the tide,
Slowly on we'll glide floating with the tide,

On we'll ride away;
On the stream we'll ride away;

Through wavelets shimm'ring brightly,
Through wavelets shimm'ring brightly,

Carelessly rowing lightly,
Carelessly rowing lightly,

Reach we the steeps
We'll reach soon the steeps

Where the birds warble,
Where the fountain sleeps.

warble, the birds sprightly.
Where warble the birds sprightly.

'Neath the dome rowers unite,
'Neath the leafy dome, where the jasmine white,

Come and join we their meeting!
Ah! come join we their meeting!
