= Roger Spottiswoode =

Canadian-British film director

- Born: John Roger Spottiswoode; 5 January 1945 (age 81); Ottawa, Ontario, Canada
- Occupations: Film director; screenwriter; film editor; television director
- Years active: 1966–present
- Spouse: Holly Palance (m. 1983; div. 1997)
- Children: 2
- Father: Raymond Spottiswoode
- Awards: Gemini Award for Best Direction in a Dramatic Program or Mini-Series

John Roger Spottiswoode (born 5 January 1945) is a Canadian-British director, editor, and writer of film and television.

== Early life ==
Spottiswoode was born in Ottawa, Ontario, Canada, and spent his teens in England. His father Raymond Spottiswoode was a British film theoretician who worked at the National Film Board of Canada during the 1940s, directing short films such as Wings of a Continent.

== Career ==
In the 1960s, Spottiswoode entered the British film industry as a trainee editor where he apprenticed under editor John Bloom. In the early 1970s Spottiswoode edited several films for Sam Peckinpah.

He wanted to direct and Walter Hill advised him the best way in was to write a script. Hill and Spottiswoode collaborated on the scripts for 48 Hours and the never-made The Last Gun.

Spottiswoode turned to directing in the early 1980s and has since directed a number of notable films and television productions, including Under Fire (1983) and the 1997 James Bond film Tomorrow Never Dies starring Pierce Brosnan. Spottiswoode was a member of the writing team responsible for 48 Hrs. starring Eddie Murphy and Nick Nolte. In 2000, he directed the science fiction action thriller The 6th Day starring Arnold Schwarzenegger.

== Filmography ==
=== Film ===
Year	Title	Credited as			Notes	Refs.
Year	Title	Director	Writer	Editor	Notes	Refs.
1971	Straw Dogs	No	No	Yes		
1973	Pat Garrett and Billy the Kid	No	No	Yes		
1974	The Gambler	No	No	Yes		
1975	Hard Times	No	No	Yes		
1980	Terror Train	Yes	No	No		
1981	The Pursuit of D. B. Cooper	Yes	No	No	Replaced director Buzz Kulik	
1982	48 Hrs.	No	Yes	No	Co-written with Walter Hill, Larry Gross & Steven E. de Souza	
1983	Under Fire	Yes	No	No		
1986	The Best of Times	Yes	No	No		
1988	Shoot to Kill	Yes	No	No		
1989	Turner & Hooch	Yes	No	No		
1990	Air America	Yes	No	No		
1992	Stop! Or My Mom Will Shoot	Yes	No	No		
1994	Mesmer	Yes	No	No		
1997	Tomorrow Never Dies	Yes	No	No		
2000	The 6th Day	Yes	No	No		
2003	Spinning Boris	Yes	No	No		
2005	Ripley Under Ground	Yes	No	No		
2007	Shake Hands with the Devil	Yes	No	No		
2008	The Children of Huang Shi	Yes	No	No		
2012	Beyond Right and Wrong	Yes	No	No	Documentary film; Co-directed with Lekha Singh	
2014	The Journey Home	Yes	No	No	Co-directed with Brando Quilici	
2016	A Street Cat Named Bob	Yes	No	No		
2021	Either Side of Midnight	Yes	No	No		

=== TV movies ===
Year	Title	Notes
1982	The Renegades	TV movie pilot
1987	Third Degree Burn	
1989	And the Band Played On	
1995	Hiroshima	
1997	Murder Live!	
2000	Noriega: God's Favorite	
2002	The Matthew Shepard Story	
2003	Spinning Boris	
2003	Ice Bound: A Woman's Survival at the South Pole	
2018	The Beach House	

== Awards and nominations ==
Year	Award	Category	Nominee	Result	Notes	Ref.
1982	Festival du Film Policier de Cognac	Special Jury Prize	The Pursuit of D. B. Cooper	Won		
1983	Edgar Award	Best Motion Picture	48 Hrs.	Nominated	with Walter Hill, Larry Gross, and Steven E. de Souza	
1988	CableACE Award	Directing, Movie or Miniseries	The Last Innocent Man	Nominated		
1988	NAACP Image Awards	Best Motion Picture	Shoot to Kill	Nominated		
1993	Montreal World Film Festival	Special Grand Jury Prize	And the Band Played On	Won		
1994	Directors Guild of America Awards	Outstanding Directorial Achievement in Movies for Television and Limited Series	And the Band Played On	Nominated		
1994	Primetime Emmy Awards	Outstanding Directing for a Limited or Anthology Series or Movie	And the Band Played On	Nominated		
1995	CableACE Award	Directing, Movie or Miniseries	And the Band Played On	Nominated		
1995	Gemini Awards	Best Direction in a Dramatic Program or Mini-Series	Hiroshima	Won		
2003	Hamptons International Film Festival	Audience Award for Best Narrative Feature	Spinning Boris	Won		
2007	Cinéfest Sudbury International Film Festival	Audience Award	Shake Hands with the Devil	Won		
2007	Cinéfest Sudbury International Film Festival	Best Canadian Film	Shake Hands with the Devil	Won		
2008	Beverly Hills Film Festival	Jury Award	Shake Hands with the Devil	Won		
2008	Genie Awards	Best Achievement in Direction	Roger Spottiswoode	Nominated		
