= Slim Whitman discography =

Slim Whitman was an American singer-songwriter and guitarist. He signed a recording contract with RCA Victor in 1948 and is first commercial single, complete with trademark yodel "I'm Casting My Lasso Towards the Sky", appeared the following year in 1949, and his first album, Slim Whitman Sings and Yodels, in 1954.

He recorded his first major hit Indian Love Call in 1952 from the musical Rose Marie, later in 1955 he recorded the musical's theme song of the same name, that this would break the record in the United Kingdom for the longest time spent at number 1 on the charts, a record that stood until 1992 when Bryan Adams released (Everything I Do) I Do It for You

In the 1970s, when albums where the main medium, he had a Number 1 with ;Red River Valley (1976) and a number 2 with Home on the Range (1977)

Whitman's last charting album was an album of holiday classics titled Christmas with Slim Whitman (1980). After Angeline (1984) that was his last solo album under contract with the major label Epic Records,

Whitman however recorded two albums with his son Byron Whitman, with Magic Moments in 1988 and Traditional Country in 1998.

Later, after a lengthy hiatus, he recorded his last album Twilight on the Trail that was released by independent label Rangeland Records in 2010.

== Studio albums ==
Year	Album	Chart positions			Cert.	Label
Year	Album	US Ctry.	US	UK	Cert.	Label
1954	Slim Whitman Sings and Yodels^{[A]}	—	—	—		10", RCA Victor LPM 3217
1954	America's Favorite Folk Artist	—	—	—		10", Imperial IM-3004
1954	Slim Whitman and His Singing Guitar	—	—	—		Non-US, 10", London H-APB 1015
1956	Slim Whitman Favorites (later reissued as Country Hits, Volume 2)	—	—	—		Imperial LP 9003; LP-9003, LP-12100 (Country Hits, Volume 2)
1956	Slim Whitman and His Singing Guitar – Vol. 2	—	—	—		Non-US, London HA-U2015
1957	Slim Whitman Sings (later reissued as Country Hits, Volume 1)	—	—	—		Imperial LP 9026; LP-9026, LP-12104 (Country Hits, Volume 1)
1958	Slim Whitman Sings (later reissued as My Best to You)	—	—	—		Imperial LP 9056; LP-9056, LP-12105 (My Best to You)
1959	Slim Whitman Sings (later reissued as Country Favorites)<	—	—	—		Imperial LP 9064; LP-9064, LP-12106 (Country Favorites)
1959	I'll Walk with God	—	—	—		Imperial LP 9088; LP-9088, LP-12032 (reissue)
1960	Slim Whitman Sings Million Record Hits (later reissued as The Song of the Old Waterwheel)	—	—	—		Imperial LP 9102, LP 12102; LP-9088, LP-12032 (The Song of the Old Waterwheel)
1960	Slim Whitman a.k.a. Slim Whitman's First Visit to Britain (later reissued as I'll Never Stop Loving You)	—	—	—		Imperial LP 9135, LP 12135; LP-9135, LP-12135 (I'll Never Stop Loving You); Sunset SUS-5267 (1969, budget reissue)
1961	Just Call Me Lonesome (later reissued as Portrait)	—	—	—		Imperial LP 9137, LP 12137; LP-9137, LP-12137 (Portrait)
1961	Once in a Lifetime (later reissued as Cool Water)	—	—	—		Imperial LP 9156; LP-9156, LP-12156 (Cool Water)
1961	Slim Whitman Sings Annie Laurie (later reissued as Sweeter than the Flowers)	—	—	—		Imperial LP 9163, LP 12077; UK title: Slim Whitman Sings—Vol. 3 (London); LP-9163, LP-12077 (Sweeter than the Flowers)
1962	Forever	—	—	—		Imperial LP 9171, LP 12171
1962	Slim Whitman Sings (later reissued as Anytime)	—	—	—		Imperial LP 9194, LP 12194; UK title: Slim Whitman Sings—Vol. 4 (London); LP-9194, LP-12194 (Anytime)
1962	Heart Songs & Love Songs	—	—	—		Imperial LP 9209; LP-9209, LP-12209 (Heart Songs)
1963	I'm a Lonely Wanderer	—	—	—		Imperial LP 9226
1963	Yodeling	—	—	—		Imperial LP-9235, LP-12235
1963	Irish Songs the Slim Whitman Way	—	—	—		Imperial LP 9245, LP 12245
1964	All-Time Favorites	—	—	—		Imperial LP-9252, LP-12252; LP-9252, LP-12252 (Favorites)
1964	Country Songs / City Hits	—	—	—		Imperial LP-9268, LP-12268
1965	Love Song of the Waterfall	20	—	—		Imperial LP-9277, LP-12277
1965	Reminiscing	—	—	—		Imperial LP-9288, LP-12288
1965	More than Yesterday (More Country Songs & City Hits)	28	—	—		Imperial LP-9303, LP-12303
1966	God's Hand in Mine	—	—	—		Imperial LP 9308, LP 12308
1966	A Travelin' Man	—	—	—		Imperial LP 9313, LP 12313
1966	A Time for Love	—	—	—		Imperial LP-9333, LP-12333
1967	15th Anniversary Album	25	—	—		Imperial LP-9342, LP-12342
1967	Country Memories	42	—	—		Imperial LP-9356, LP-12356
1968	In Love the Whitman Way	16	—	—		Imperial LP-9375, LP-12375
1968	Happy Street	34	—	—		Imperial LP-12411
1969	Slim! (later reissued as Straight from the Heart)	—	—	—		Imperial LP-12436
1969	The Slim Whitman Christmas Album	—	—	—		Imperial LP-12448
1970	Tomorrow Never Comes	—	—	—		United Artists UAS 6763
1971	Guess Who (released in the UK as Snowbird)	31	—	—		United Artists UAS 6783; UK title: Snowbird (UAS 29151)
1971	It's a Sin to Tell a Lie	23	—	—		United Artists UAS 6819
1972	The Best of Slim Whitman	—	—	—		United Artists UAS-6832
1973	I'll See You When	—	—	—		United Artists
1974	Happy Anniversary	—	—	44	BPI: Silver	United Artists
1975	Everything Leads Back to You	42	—	—		United Artists
1976	Red River Valley^{[B]}	—	—	1	BPI: Gold	United Artists
1977	Home on the Range	—	—	2	BPI: Gold	United Artists
1978	Ghost Riders in the Sky	—	—	27	BPI: Gold	United Artists
1980	Till We Meet Again	—	—	—		United Artists
1980	Songs I Love to Sing^{[C]}	25	175	—		Cleveland Int'l / Epic
1980	Christmas with Slim Whitman	47	184	—		Cleveland Int'l / Epic
1981	Mr. Songman	—	—	—		Cleveland Int'l / Epic
1981	I'll Be Home for Christmas	—	—	—		Cleveland Int'l / Epic
1984	Angeline	—	—	—		Epic FE 39227
1988	Magic Moments {with Byron Whitman)	—	—	—		Australia, EMI EMC 790875
1998	Traditional Country: The Legendary Slim Whitman with Son Byron Whitman {with Byron Whitman)	—	—	—		Cabin Creek / Mac-T Records; CCMAC-T762
2010	Twilight on the Trail	—	—	—		Rangeland Records

^{[A]} Slim Whitman Sings and Yodels compiles recordings made by Whitman for RCA Victor in the late 1940s – 1950 and was released after the singer made it big on Imperial. But since it was common practice at the time to compile albums from recordings already available as 78-r.p.m. and 45-r.p.m. sides, the album is listed here as a regular one and not as a compilation.
Colin Larkin's Encyclopedia of Popular Music, too, lists it as a regular album, along with America's Favorite Folk Singer that was released in the same year by Imperial and compiled songs recorded for the Imperial label.
^{[B]} Red River Valley also peaked at no. 18 in New Zealand and at no. 81 on the retrospective Kent Music Report chart in Australia.
^{[C]} Songs I Love to Sing also peaked at no. 24 on the RPM Country Albums chart in Canada.

== Live albums ==
Year	Album	Chart positions			Cert.	Label
Year	Album	US Ctry.	US	UK	Cert.	Label
1973	25th Anniversary Concert	—	—	—	BPI: Silver	Non-US, United Artists UAG 29488 (Europe)

== Compilation albums ==
Year	Album	Chart positions					Cert.	Label
Year	Album	US Ctry.	US	AUS	NZ	UK	Cert.	Label
1966	Birmingham Jail and Other Country Favourites	—	—	—	—	—		RCA Camden CAL 954, CAS 954
1966	Unchain Your Heart	—	—	—	—	—		Sunset SUM-1112
1967	The Best of Slim Whitman – Volume 3	—	—	—	—	—		UK, Liberty LBY 3092
1967	A Lonesome Heart (a.k.a. Lonesome Cowboy)	—	—	—	—	—		Sunset SUM-1167, SUS-5167Sunset SLS 50052 Z / SUS 5167 (Lonesome Cowboy)
1968	Cool Water a.k.a. Country Style and The Best of Slim Whitman	—	—	—	—	—		Non-US, Liberty
1970	Ramblin' Rose	—	—	—	—	—		Sunset SUS-5320
1972	The Slim Whitman Collection	—	—	—	—	—		2×LP, non-US, United Artists UAD 60021/2
1973	The Slim Whitman Story	—	—	—	—	—	BPI: Gold	6×LP boxed set, World Records
1974	The Very Best of Slim Whitman	—	—	—	—	—		United Artists UA-LA245-G
1976	The Very Best of Slim Whitman	—	—	—	—	1	BPI: Gold	Non-US, United Artists UAS 29898
1979	All My Best	—	—	—	—	—		Special Projects SL-8128 (distr. by Suffolk Marketing); TV-marketed, between 1.5 and 4 million direct sales
1979	Slim Whitman's 20 Greatest Love Songs	—	—	—	—	18	BPI: Gold	Non-US, United Artists
1980	Just for You	—	—	—	—	—		Special Projects SL-8140 (distr. by Suffolk Marketing); TV-marketed
1982	The Best	—	—	—	—	—		Special Projects SLL-8300 (distr. by Suffolk Marketing); TV-marketed
1982	20 Golden Greats	—	—	2	—	—		Liberty Play
1987	A Dream Comes True – The Rarities Album	—	—	—	—	—		2×LP, Australia, Liberty UAC 261368
1989	Best Loved Favorites	—	—	—	2	—		Heartland Music, TV-marketed
1990	The Best of Slim Whitman: 1951–1971 (or 1952–1972)	—	—	—	—	—		Rhino R2 70976
1991	20 Precious Memories	—	—	—	42	—		Quality Special Products, TV-marketed
1991	Cowpoke	—	—	—	—	—		EMI
1993	EMI Country Masters: Slim Whitman – 50 Original Tracks	—	—	—	—	—		2×CD, EMI CDEM 1482
1994	Love Songs	—	—	—	—	—		UK, Music for Pleasure CDP828951
1997	Rose Marie – His Recordings 1949–1959	—	—	—	—	—		6×CD boxed set, Bear Family
1997	The Very Best of Slim Whitman – 50th Anniv. Collection	—	—	—	—	54		EMI 100 7243 8 59653 2 6
1998	The Very Best Of Slim Whitman	—	—	—	—	—		Non-US, Pegasus PEG CD 154 same as? The Legendary Slim Whitman
2009	The Essential Slim Whitman	—	—	—	—	—		3×CD, EMI
2010	The Very Best of Slim Whitman	—	—	—	—	—		Non-US, EMI Gold 50999 6 94442 2 7

== Singles (U.S.) ==
This is a list of U.S. singles. In the UK, Whitman's recordings were released on London Records, and the songs were often coupled differently.

For songs released before 1958, the "album" column simply indicates the first album appearance. It doesn't have to be (and often isn't) the same version. There is also a 1962 album titled Forever, for which Whitman recorded new versions of some more of his early hits ("Danny Boy", "North Wind", "I'm a Fool", and "Smoke Signals").

After Whitman hit it big on Imperial, RCA Victor hastily issued several singles with his old recordings for the label to cash off of his popularity. The 1953 RCA Victor single "I'm Casting My Lasso Towards the Sky" was even coupled with the same song as the then-latest Whitman's single for Imperial.

Year	Single	Chart positions				Album	Label (U.S.)
Year	Single	US Ctry.	US	UK	CAN Ctry.	Album	Label (U.S.)
1949	"I'm Casting My Lasso Towards the Sky" / "I'll Do as Much for You Someday"	—	—	—		Slim Whitman Sings and Yodels	RCA Victor 21-0038
1949	"Please Paint a Rose on the Garden Wall" / "Tears Can Never Drown the Flame"			—		Slim Whitman Sings and Yodels	RCA Victor 21-0073
1949	"I'll Never Pass This Way Again" / "Birmingham Jail"			—		Slim Whitman Sings and Yodels	RCA Victor 21-0141
1952	"Love Song of the Waterfall" / "My Love Is Growing Stale"	10	—	—		America's Favorite Folk Artist	Imperial 8134
1952	"Love Song of the Waterfall" / "My Love Is Growing Stale"	—	—	—		America's Favorite Folk Artist	Imperial 8134
1952	"Bandera Waltz" / "End of the World"	—	—	—		America's Favorite Folk Artist	Imperial 8144
1952	"Cold Empty Arms" / "In a Hundred Years or More"	—	—	—		—N/a	Imperial 8147
1952	"Indian Love Call" / "China Doll"	2	9	7^{B}		America's Favorite Folk Artist	Imperial 8156
1952	"Indian Love Call" / "China Doll"	—	—	15^{B}		America's Favorite Folk Artist	Imperial 8156
1952	"An Amateur in Love" / "By the Waters of the Minnetonka"	—	—	—		America's Favorite Folk Artist	Imperial 8163
1952	"Keep It a Secret" / "My Heart Is Broken in Three"	3	—	—		Slim Whitman Favorites	Imperial 8169
1952	"Keep It a Secret" / "My Heart Is Broken in Three"	10	—	—		—N/a	Imperial 8169
1953	"All That I'm Asking Is Sympathy" / "How Can I Tell"			—		Slim Whitman Sings (1957)	Imperial 8180
1953	"Restless Heart" / "Song of the Old Water Wheel"			—		—N/a	Imperial 8189
1953	"Danny Boy" / "There's a Rainbow In Every Teardrop"			—		—N/a	Imperial 8201
1953	"Danny Boy" / "There's a Rainbow In Every Teardrop"			—		Slim Whitman Sings (1959)	Imperial 8201
1953	"I'm Casting My Lasso Towards the Sky" (c/w "There's a Rainbow in Ev'ry Teardrop")	—	—	—		Slim Whitman Sings and Yodels	RCA Victor 5431
1953	"North Wind" (c/w "Darlin' Don't Cry")	8	—	—		—N/a	Imperial 8208
1953	"Stairway to Heaven" / "Lord, Help Me Be as Thou"			—		—N/a	Imperial 8220
1953	"Birmingham Jail" (c/w "Wabash Waltz")			—		Slim Whitman Sings and Yodels	RCA Victor 5557
1954	"Secret Love"	2		—		Slim Whitman Favorites	
1954	"Rose Marie" (c/w "We Stood At The Altar")	4		1		Slim Whitman Favorites	Imperial 8236
1954	"Beautiful Dreamer"			—		Slim Whitman Favorites	
1954	"Singing Hills" / "I Hate to See You Cry"	4	—	—		Slim Whitman Sings (1959)	
1954	"Singing Hills" / "I Hate to See You Cry"	—	—	—		—N/a	
1955	"The Cattle Call"	11		—		Slim Whitman Favorites	
1955	"Roll On Silvery Moon"			—		Slim Whitman Sings (1957)	
1955	"I'll Never Stop Loving You"			—		Slim Whitman (1960)	
1955	"Song of the Wild"			—		Heart Songs & Love Songs	
1956	"Tumbling Tumbleweeds"			19		Slim Whitman Sings (1957)	
1956	"I'm a Fool" / "Serenade"		—	16		—N/a	
1956	"I'm a Fool" / "Serenade"	—	—	8^{C}		Slim Whitman Sings (1957)	
1956	"The Whiffenpoof Song"			—		Slim Whitman Sings (1959)	
1956	"Smoke Signals / "Curtain of Tears"	—	—	—		—N/a	Imperial 8308
1957	"I Must Have Been Blind" / "Careless Love"	—	—	—		Slim Whitman Sings (1959)	Imperial 8309
1957	"I'll Take You Home Again, Kathleen" (c/w "Lovesick Blues")		93	7		Slim Whitman Sings (1957)	Imperial 8310
1957	"Unchain My Heart"			—		Slim Whitman Sings (1959)	
1957	"Careless Hands"			—		Slim Whitman Sings (1958)	
1958	"Candy Kisses"			—		Slim Whitman Sings (1958)	
1958	"Put Your Trust in Me"			—		Slim Whitman Sings (1958)	
1958	"At the End of Nowhere"			—		Slim Whitman Sings (1958)	
1959	"I Never See Maggie Alone"			—		Slim Whitman (1960)	
1959	"A Tree in the Meadow"			—		Slim Whitman (1960)	
1959	"A Fool Such as I"			—		Slim Whitman (1960)	
1959	"Roll River Roll"			—		Once in a Lifetime	
1960	"I'll Walk with God"			—		I'll Walk with God	
1960	"Wind"			—		Once in a Lifetime	
1960	"Ramona"			—		Just Call Me Lonesome	
1961	"Just Call Me Lonesome"			—		Just Call Me Lonesome	
1961	"The Bells That Broke My Heart"	30		—		Just Call Me Lonesome	
1961	"Once in a Lifetime"			—		Once in a Lifetime	
1961	"The Old Spinning Wheel"			—		Slim Whitman Sings Annie Laurie	
1961	"It Sure Looks Lonesome Outside"			—		Slim Whitman Sings Annie Laurie	
1962	"Annie Laurie"			—		Slim Whitman Sings Annie Laurie	
1962	"Backward, Turn Backward (O' Time In Your Flight)"			—		I'm a Lonely Wanderer	
1962	"Blues Stay Away from Me"			—		Heart Songs & Love Songs	
1962	"The Wayward Wind"			—		Slim Whitman Sings (1962)	
1963	"Love Letters in the Sand"			—		Slim Whitman Sings (1962)	
1963	"So Long Mary"			—		All-Time Favorites	
1963	"Broken Down Merry-Go-Round"			—		All-Time Favorites	
1963	"My Wild Irish Rose"			—		Irish Songs the Slim Whitman Way	
1963	"Maria Elena"			—		More than Yesterday (More Country Songs & City Hits)	
1964	"Tell Me Pretty Words"	48		—		All-Time Favorites	
1964	"I'll Hold You in My Heart"			—		Country Songs / City Hits	
1964	"Virginia"			—		Love Song of the Waterfall	
1965	"Reminiscing"^{A}			—		Reminiscing	
1965	"More than Yesterday"	8		—		More Than Yesterday (More Country Songs & City Hits)	
1965	"The Twelfth of Never"	17		—		More Than Yesterday (More Country Songs & City Hits)	
1966	"I Remember You"	49	134	—		A Travelin' Man	
1966	"One Dream"	54		—		A Time for Love	
1967	"What's This World A-Comin' To"	56		—		A Time for Love	
1967	"I'm a Fool"	61		—		15th Anniversary Album	
1967	"The Keeper of the Key"	65		—		Country Memories	
1968	"Rainbows Are Back in Style"	17		—	6	In Love the Whitman Way	
1968	"Happy Street"	22		—	10	Happy Street	
1968	"Livin' On Lovin' (and Lovin' Livin' with You)"	43		—		Happy Street	
1969	"My Happiness"	43		—		Happy Street	
1969	"Irresistible"	61		—		Slim!	
1970	"Tomorrow Never Comes"	27		—		Tomorrow Never Comes	
1970	"Shutters and Boards"	26		—		Tomorrow Never Comes	
1971	"Guess Who"	7	121	—	5	Guess Who	
1971	"Something Beautiful (to Remember)" (c/w "Jerry")	6		—	23	It's a Sin to Tell a Lie	United Artists 50775
1971	"It's a Sin to Tell a Lie"	21		—		It's a Sin to Tell a Lie	
1971	"The Loveliest Night of the Year"	56		—		It's a Sin to Tell a Lie	
1972	"Little Drops of Silver"			—		—N/a	
1972	"(It's No) Sin"	51		—		The Best of Slim Whitman	
1973	"Hold Me"	73		—		I'll See You When	
1973	"Where the Lilacs Grow"	88		—		I'll See You When	
1974	"It's All in the Game"	82		—		Happy Anniversary	
1974	"Happy Anniversary" (c/w "What I Had With You") (Europe, Aus. and NZ)	—	—	14		Happy Anniversary	
1974	"Foolish Question"			—		I'll See You When	
1975	"Everything Leads Back to You"			—		Everything Leads Back to You	
1975	"Mexicali Rose"			—		Everything Leads Back to You	
1977	"Red River Valley"			—		Red River Valley	
1980	"When"	15		—	17	Songs I Love to Sing	
1980	"That Silver-Haired Daddy of Mine"	69				Songs I Love to Sing	
1980	"I Remember You" (re-recording)	44		—		Songs I Love to Sing	
1980	"Where is the Christ in Christmas"			—		Christmas with Slim Whitman	
1981	"Can't Help Falling in Love with You"	54		—		Mr. Songman	
1981	"If I Had My Life to Live Over"			—		Mr. Songman	
1981	"My Melody of Love"			—		Mr. Songman	
1984	"Cry Baby Heart"			—		Angeline	

^{[A]} "Reminiscing" peaked at No. 4 on the RPM Adult Contemporary Tracks chart in Canada.
^{[B]} "Indian Love Call" and "China Doll" charted in the UK upon the single's reissue(s) in 1955 (cat. no. London HL 1149, 1955 reussue).
^{[C]} In the UK, "Serenade" was released as a single on its own right, coupled with "I Talk to the Waves" (London HL 8287)

== Singles (UK) ==
This is a list of singles released in the UK on the London label.

- "Indian Love Call" / "China Doll" (HL 1149, November 1952)
- "Love Song of the Waterfall" / "How Can I Tell?" (L 1186)
- "Bandera Waltz" / "My Love Is Growing Stale" (L 1191)
- "Song of the Old Waterwheel" / "Restless Heart" (L 1194)
- "My Heart Is Broken in Three" / "Cold, Empty Arms" (L 1206)
- "Danny Boy" / "There's a Rainbow in Every Teadrop" (L 1214)
- "North Wind" / "Darlin' Don't Cry" (L 1226)
- "Stairway to Heaven" / "Lord, Help Me Be as Thou" (HL 8018)
- "Secret Love" / "Why?" (HL 8039)
- "Rose Marie" / "We Stood at the Altar" (HL 8061)
- "Beautiful Dreamer" / "Ride Away" (HL 8080)
- "The Singing Hills" / "I Hate to See You Cry" (HL 8091)
- "Cattle Call" / "When I Grow Too Old to Dream" (HL 8125)
- "Roll On, Silvery Moon" / "Haunter Hungry Heart" (HL 8141)
- "I'll Never Stop Loving You" / "I'll Never Take You Back Again" (HL 8167)
- "Song of the Wild" / "You Have My Heart" (HL 8196)
- "Tumbling Tumbleweeds" / "Tell Me" (HL 8230)
- "I'm a Fool" / "My Heart Is Broken in Three" (HL 8252)
- "Serenade" / "I Talk to the Waves" (HL 8287)
- "The Whiffenpoof Song" / "Dear Mary" (HL 8327)
- "I'm Casting My Lasso Towards the Sky" / "There's a Love Knot in My Lariat" (HL 8350)
- "I'll Take You Home Again, Kathleen" / "Careless Love" (HL 8403)
- "Curtain of Tears" / "Smoke Signals" (HL 8416)
- "An Amateur in Love" / "(Since You've) Gone" (HL 8420)
- "Warm, Warm Lips" / "Many Times" (HL 8434)
- "Lovesick Blues" / "Forever" (HL 8459)
- "Unchain My Heart" / "Hush-a-bye" (HL 8518)
- "A Very Precious Love" / "Careless Hands" (HL 8590)
- "Candy Kisses" / "Tormented" (HL 8642)
- "At the End of Nowhere" / "Wherever You Are" (HL 8708)
