= Slim Whitman Sings =

Slim Whitman Sings may refer to several studio albums by Slim Whitman:

- Slim Whitman Sings (1957 album)
- Slim Whitman Sings (1958 album)
- Slim Whitman Sings (1959 album)
- Slim Whitman Sings Million Record Hits, 1960
- Slim Whitman Sings Annie Laurie, 1961
- Slim Whitman Sings (1962 album)
