= 25th Anniversary Concert =

Live album by Slim Whitman
- Released: 1973
- Genre: Country
- Label: United Artists

Slim Whitman chronology
| I'll See You When (1973) | 25th Anniversary Concert (1973) | Happy Anniversary (1974) |

Professional ratings
Review scores
| Source | Rating |
|---|---|
| The Encyclopedia of Popular Music | 3/5 stars |

25th Anniversary Concert is a live album by Slim Whitman, released in 1973 on United Artists Records.

== Track listing ==
The album was released in Europe and Australia.

Side one

1. Opening announcement / Instrumental
  Opening of "Indian Love Call" (
  - Rudolf Friml
  - Otto Harbach
  - Oscar Hammerstein II
  )
2. "I'm Casting My Lasso Towards the Sky" (
  - Lee White
  - Jimmy Wakely
  )
3. "Serenade" (
  - Sammy Cahn
  - Nicholas Brodsky
  )
4. "Cool Water" (Bob Nolan)
5. "Cattle Call" (Tex Owens)
6. "The Twelfth of Never" (
  - Jerry Livingston
  - Paul Francis Webster
  )
7. "Love Song of the Waterfall" (
  - Bob Nolan
  - Bernard Barnes
  - Carl Winge
  )
8. "Got the All Overs for You (All over Me)" (Freddie Hart)

Total length: 20:45

Side two

1. "There's a Love Knot in My Lariat" (Wilf Carter)
2. "Poor Little Angeline" (
  - Will Grosz
  - Jimmy Kennedy
  )
3. Medley:
  "China Doll" (G. Kannan, A. Kannan);
  "Indian Love Call" (
  - Rudolf Friml
  - Otto Harbach
  - Oscar Hammerstein II
  );
  "Rose Marie" (
  - Rudolf Friml
  - Otto Harbach
  - Oscar Hammerstein II
  )
4. "The Old Spinning Wheel" (Billy Hill)
5. "I'll Take You Home Again Kathleen" (Arr.
  - Slim Whitman
  - Scott Turner
  )
6. "When I Grow Too Old to Dream" (
  - Sigmund Romberg
  - Oscar Hammerstein II
  )

Total length: 21:00

== Certifications ==
| Region | Certification | Certified units/sales |
|---|---|---|
| United Kingdom (BPI) | Silver | 60,000^{^} |
^{^} Shipments figures based on certification alone.
