= Forever (Slim Whitman album) =

Studio album by Slim Whitman
- Released: 1962
- Genre: Country
- Label: Imperial

Slim Whitman chronology
Slim Whitman Sings Annie Laurie (1961)	Forever (1962)	Slim Whitman Sings (1962)

Professional ratings
Review scores
Source	Rating
AllMusic	3/5 stars
The Encyclopedia of Popular Music	3/5 stars

Forever is a studio album by Slim Whitman, released in 1962 on Imperial Records.

== Track listing ==
The album was issued in the United States by Imperial as a 12-inch long-playing record, catalog numbers LP 9171 (mono) and LP 12171 (stereo).

Side one
No.	Title	Writer(s)	Length
1.	"Forever"	J. Stone	2:00
2.	"You're the Only One"	Claude Taylor; Jerry Crist	2:37
3.	"There's a Love Knot in My Lariat"	Wilf Carter	2:43
4.	"Too Late (with Your Kisses)"	J. Allison; A. Allison	2:40
5.	"I Leave the Milky Way"	Arr. C. Jarvis	2:35
6.	"Smoke Signals"	Gene Evans; Slim Whitman	2:40

Side two
No.	Title	Writer(s)	Length
1.	"Cold Empty Arms"	Jerry Crist	2:47
2.	"Blue River"	E. Alee; J. Whitman	2:42
3.	"Danny Boy"	F. E. Weatherly	2:45
4.	"North Wind"	Rod Morris	2:40
5.	"Darlin' Don't Cry"	Jerry Crist	2:40
6.	"I'm a Fool"	Tommy Smith	2:35
