= The Very Best of Slim Whitman =

Compilation album by Slim Whitman
- Released: 1976
- Genre: Country
- Label: United Artists

Slim Whitman chronology
Everything Leads Back to You (1975)	The Very Best of Slim Whitman (1976)	Red River Valley (1976)

Professional ratings
Review scores
Source	Rating
The Encyclopedia of Popular Music	3/5 stars

The Very Best of Slim Whitman is a compilation album by Slim Whitman, released in 1976 on United Artists Records.

It spent six weeks at number one on the UK singles chart.

== Track listing ==
The album was issued in the UK by United Artists Records as a 12-inch long-playing record, catalog number UAS 29898.

Side one
No.	Title	Writer(s)	Copyright year	Length
1.	"Rose Marie"	Rudolf Friml; Otto Harbach; Oscar Hammerstein II	1967	2:20
2.	"Cool Water"	Bob Nolan	1962	2:45
3.	"I'll Take You Home Again Kathleen"	Trad. arr. by: Slim Whitman; Scott Turner	1967	2:48
4.	"I Remember You"	Johnny Mercer; Victor Schertzinger	1966	2:03
5.	"Secret Love"	Paul Francis Webster; Sammy Fain	1967	2:36
6.	"Snowbird"	Gene MacLellan	1971	2:05
7.	"Ramblin' Rose"	Noel and Joe Sherman	1964	1:55
8.	"Love Song of the Waterfall"	Bob Nolan; Bernard Barnes; Carl Winge	1967	2:35
9.	"The Old Spinning Wheel"	Billy Hill	1962	2:02
10.	"It's a Sin to Tell a Lie"	Billy Mayhew	1971	2:14

Side two
No.	Title	Writer(s)	Copyright year	Length
1.	"Happy Anniversary"	Gary Paxton	1974	2:31
2.	"The Twelfth of Never"	Paul Francis Webster; Jerry Livingston	1968	2:15
3.	"Serenade"	Sammy Cahn; Nicholas Brodsky	1967	2:15
4.	"Roses Are Red (My Love)"	Al Byron; Paul Evans	1968	2:30
5.	"China Doll"	Kenny Cannan; Gerald Cannan	1967	3:00
6.	"Walking in the Sunshine"	Roger Miller	1969	2:30
7.	"When You Were Sweet Sixteen"	James Thornton	1969	1:55
8.	"Honeymoon Feelin'"	Gary Paxton; Ron Hellard	1975	2:59
9.	"Have I Told You Lately That I Love You"	Scott; Wiseman	1964	2:16
10.	"Indian Love Call"	Rudolf Friml; Otto Harbach; Oscar Hammerstein II	1967	3:12

== Charts ==
Chart (1976)	Peak position
UK Albums (OCC)	1
