= Happy Anniversary =

Happy Anniversary may refer to:

== Film and television ==
- Happy Anniversary (1959 film), a 1959 motion picture starring David Niven and Mitzi Gaynor
- Happy Anniversary (2018 film)
- Happy Anniversary (upcoming film), an upcoming film starring Aishwarya Rai Bachchan, Abhishek Bachchan and Sushmita Sen
- "Happy Anniversary" (Angel), a 2001 TV episode
- "Happy Anniversary" (Arthur), a 2006 TV episode
- "Happy Anniversary" (I Dream of Jeannie), a 1966 TV episode
- "Happy Anniversary" (Reno 911!), a 2007 TV episode

== Music ==
- Happy Anniversary (album), a 1971 album by Slim Whitman
- Happy Anniversary (1959 song), a composition by Al Stillman and Robert Allen, introduced in the motion picture
- Happy Anniversary (1967 song), a song written and performed by Charles Aznavour
- "Happy Anniversary" (Slim Whitman song), 1974
- Happy Anniversary (Little River Band song)
- Happy Anniversary (2004 musical), a 2004 musical featuring songs by Charles Aznavour
