= Just Call Me Lonesome =

Just Call Me Lonesome may refer to:

- Just Call Me Lonesome (Ernest Tubb album), 1963
- Just Call Me Lonesome (Slim Whitman album), 1961
- "Just Call Me Lonesome" (Eddy Arnold song)
- "Just Call Me Lonesome" (Radney Foster song)
