= Annie Laurie (disambiguation) =

"Annie Laurie" is a popular poem and song.

Annie Laurie may also refer to:

- Annie Laurie (1916 film), a silent British film directed by Cecil Hepworth
- Annie Laurie (1927 film), a silent American film starring Lillian Gish
- Annie Laurie (1936 short film), an American short film
- Annie Laurie (1936 film), a British film
- Annie Laurie (musician) (1924–2006), American rhythm and blues singer
- Annie Laurie, or Slim Whitman Sings Annie Laurie, album by Slim Whitman, 1959
- Pen name of 19th century yellow journalist Winifred Sweet Black Bonfils
