= Ghost Riders in the Sky (album) =

Ghost Riders in the sky

Studio album by Slim Whitman
- Released: 1978
- Studio: Woodland (Nashville, Tennessee)
- Genre: Country
- Label: United Artists
- Producer: Alan Warner, Scott Turner (songwriter)

Slim Whitman chronology
| Home on the Range (1977) | Ghost Riders in the sky (1978) | Songs I Love to Sing (1980) |

Ghost Riders in the Sky is a studio album by country singer Slim Whitman released by United Artists in 1978. The title track was released in the UK in 1979 as a 7-inch single backed with "Carolina Moon".

== Track listing ==
Side 1

1. "Ghost Riders in the Sky” (Stan Jones) – 3:17
2. "Carolina Moon" (Benny Davis, Joe Burke) – 2:38
3. "All Kinds of Everything” (Derry Lindsay, Jack Smith) – 3:00
4. "Girl of My Dreams" (Sunny Clapp) – 2:48
5. ”Margie” (Benny Davis, Con Conrad, J. Russel Robinson) 2:07
6. "A Perfect Day" (Carrie Jacobs Bond) – 2:41

Side 2

1. "Calypso" (John Denver) – 2:46
2. "You Are My Sunshine” (Jimmie Davis, Charles Mitchell) – 3:02
3. "Puff the Magic Dragon” (Peter Yarrow, Leonard Lipton) – 3:22
4. "Tears Stained My Pillow" (Byron Keith Whitman) – 2:25
5. "When It's Harvest Time Sweet Angeline" (Charley Kisco, Harry Tobias, Neil Morat) – 1:49
6. "Goodbye Little Darlin' Goodbye" (Gene Autry, Johnny Marvin) – 3:09

== Personnel ==
- Harold Bradley – Electric Guitar
- Ray Edenton – Rhythm Guitar
- Sonny Garrish – Steel Guitar
- David Bird – Keyboards
- Buddy Harman – Bass
- Strings – Lisa Silver, Sam Terranova, Peter "Zeke" Dawson, Krysten Wilkinson, Martha Wiggins and Earl Spielman
- Background Vocals – The Nashville Sounds and on "Tears Stained My Pillow" The Jordanaires

== Production ==
- Producers: Alan Warner and Scotty Turner
- Orchestral Arranger: Earl Spielman
- Engineer: Les Ladd
- Recorded at Woodland Sound Studios, Nashville
