= A Travelin' Man =

Studio album by Slim Whitman
- Released: 1966
- Label: Imperial

Slim Whitman chronology
God's Hand in Mine (1966)	A Travelin' Man (1966)	A Time for Love (1966)

Singles from A Travelin' Man
- 1. "I Remember You" Released: 1966

Professional ratings
Review scores
Source	Rating
AllMusic	4/5 stars
Billboard	Positive
The Encyclopedia of Popular Music	3/5 stars

A Travelin' Man is a studio album by Slim Whitman, released in 1966 on Imperial Records.

== Track listing ==
Side one
No.	Title	Writer(s)	Length
1.	"A Travelin' Man"	Scott Turner; Harry Nilsson
2.	"Blueberry Hill"	Al Lewis; Larry Stock; Vincent Rose
3.	"I'll Never Find Another You"	Tom Springfield
4.	"At Mail Call Today"	Gene Autry; Fred Rose
5.	"No One to Cry To"	Sid Robin; Foy Willing
6.	"Lorena"	Charlie Williams

Side two
No.	Title	Writer(s)	Length
1.	"I Remember You"	Johnny Mercer; Victor Schertzinger
2.	"Take It from Me"	Turner; Williams
3.	"Hopeless"	Doc Pomus; Alan Jeffreys
4.	"I'm Throwing Rice (at the Girl I Love)"	Eddy Arnold; S. & E. Nelson
5.	"Behind the Tear"	Ned Miller; Sue Miller
6.	"At the End of the Day"	Joan Hager
