= Let Me Call You Sweetheart =

1910 song

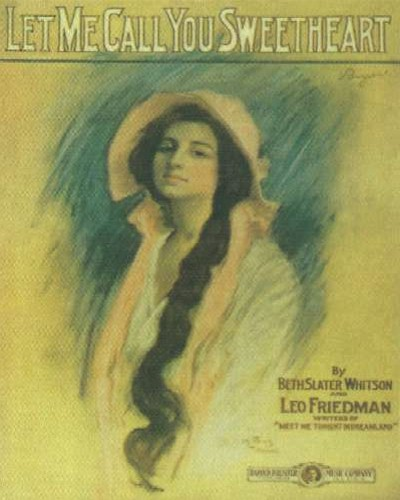
- Sheet music cover (1910)

Song
- Language: English
- Published: 1910 by Harold Rossiter Music Co.
- Genre: Popular music
- Length: 2:33
- Label: Columbia
- Composer: Leo Friedman
- Lyricist: Beth Slater Whitson

"Let Me Call You Sweetheart"
The original audio recording of the song performed by the Peerless Quartet.

"Let Me Call You Sweetheart" is a popular song, with music by Leo Friedman and lyrics by Beth Slater Whitson. The song was published in 1910 and was a huge hit for the Peerless Quartet in 1911. A recording by Arthur Clough was very popular the same year too. A 1924 recording identifies a Spanish title, "Déjame llamarte mía".

The song's recording was selected by the Library of Congress as a 2015 addition to the National Recording Registry, which selects recordings annually that are "culturally, historically, or aesthetically significant". David Sager acknowledged that the song became a standard only after a convoluted history.

== Lyrics ==
The complete lyrics of the 1911 recording:

I am dreaming Dear of you, day by day
Dreaming when the skies are blue, When they're gray
When the silv'ry moonlight gleams, Still I wander on in dreams
In a land of love, it seems, Just with you

Let me call you "Sweetheart," I'm in love with you
Let me hear you whisper that you love me too
Keep the love-light glowing in your eyes so true
Let me call you "Sweetheart," I'm in love with you

Longing for you all the while, more and more
Longing for the sunny smile, I adore
Birds are singing far and near, roses blooming everywhere
You alone my heart can cheer, you just you

Chorus

Let me call you "Sweetheart," I'm in love with you
Let me hear you whisper that you love me too
Keep the love-light glowing in your eyes so true
Let me call you "Sweetheart," I'm in love with you

== Other notable recordings ==
- Bing Crosby – recorded August 8, 1934 and on July 17, 1944.
- Denny Dennis (1941) – later included in the compilation LP Yours for a Song issued in 1969.
- Joni James – for her album Among My Souvenirs (1958).
- The Mills Brothers – included in their album Greatest Barbershop Hits (1959).
- Pat Boone and Shirley Boone – included in the album Side by Side (1959).
- Patti Page – for her album I've Heard That Song Before (1958).
- Timi Yuro - The title track from the "Let Me Call You Sweetheart" (Liberty Records 7234, 1962) - This recording went to #66 on the US Hot 100, and #15 on the Easy Listening chart.
- Fats Domino - recorded February 15, 1965.
- Slim Whitman – included in his album Red River Valley (1977).
- Valerie Carter and Linda Ronstadt – Barney Reprise
- George Holliday and Kristina Nichol (2023)

== Film and TV appearances ==
- 1932 Let Me Call You Sweetheart – Ethel Merman sings the song accompanied by a bouncing ball in a Screen Song produced by Fleischer Studios, featuring Betty Boop and Bimbo
- 1936 Mickey's Rival – Minnie Mouse hums it and Mickey whistles it while setting up their picnic, then part of the melody plays in the background at the end of the short
- 1937 Hearts Are Thumps – Alfalfa (Carl Switzer) sings the song to Darla Hood in this episode of The Little Rascals
- 1937 Make Way for Tomorrow – Victor Moore sings the song with Beulah Bondi, and the film ends with an instrumental rendition plays into the credits
- 1938 Swiss Miss – sung by Oliver Hardy
- 1940 Waterloo Bridge
- 1943 Thousands Cheer – sung by Gene Kelly whilst dancing with a mop
- 1945 Diamond Horseshoe – performed by Beatrice Kay
- 1948 For the Love of Mary
- 1952 "Million Dollar Mermaid" - song featured prominently throughout film
- 1966 Follow Me, Boys! – sung by a group of Boy Scouts
- 1975 The Waltons S03E20 – The Shivaree – sung to the Newlyweds by a group headed by Ike
- 1979 The Rose – sung by Bette Midler
- 1979 General Hospital Scotty and Laura Wedding – sung by attendees
- 1982 The Waltons - A Day of Thanks on Walton's Mountain - sung just before the closing credits
- 1984 Hart to Hart – sung to each other by Robert Wagner and Stefanie Powers as Jonathan and Jennifer Hart at the end of the fifth-season episode entitled "Max's Waltz"
- 1990 The Company of Strangers - sung by the cast during a bus ride in the opening credits sequence
- 1995 America's Funniest Home Videos - sung in a first-place winning video, "Sweetheart Singing Proposal"
- 1998 Barney's Great Adventure – performed by George Hearn
- 2000 Anne of Green Gables: The Continuing Story - the song is played at the wedding of Anne Shirley (Megan Follows) and Gilbert Blythe (Jonathan Crombie); in the latter half of the miniseries, Anne later sings the song with two performers, leading to Anne's reunion with Gilbert
- 2005 The Greatest Game Ever Played – an instrumental version by a band is heard on the soundtrack
- 2012 Downton Abbey – sung by Shirley MacLaine in her role as Martha Levinson
- 2014 52 Tuesdays – used over the end credits in this Australian film about a transgender father and his daughter Billie
- 2014 When Calls the Heart – sung by Pascale Hutton in Season 2 Episode 4
- 2016 The Witness for the Prosecution (TV series) - recurring song performed by Andrea Riseborough
- 2017 Adventure Time – used in Season 9 Elements episode sung by Candy Kingdom characters
- 2019 Gameface - used in Series 2 Episode 1 (Prank), sung by the character Tania (Tiff Stevenson) and then played over the end credits
- 2020 Murdoch Mysteries - used in Season 13 Episode 17 "Things Left Behind", sung by the character Dr. Andrew Dixon
- 2023 - used in the opening and closing credits of the 3 part series 'Loving Elvis' - performed by George Holliday and Kristina Nichol

== See also ==
- List of best-selling sheet music
