= Dick Todd (singer) =

Canadian pop singer (1914–1973)

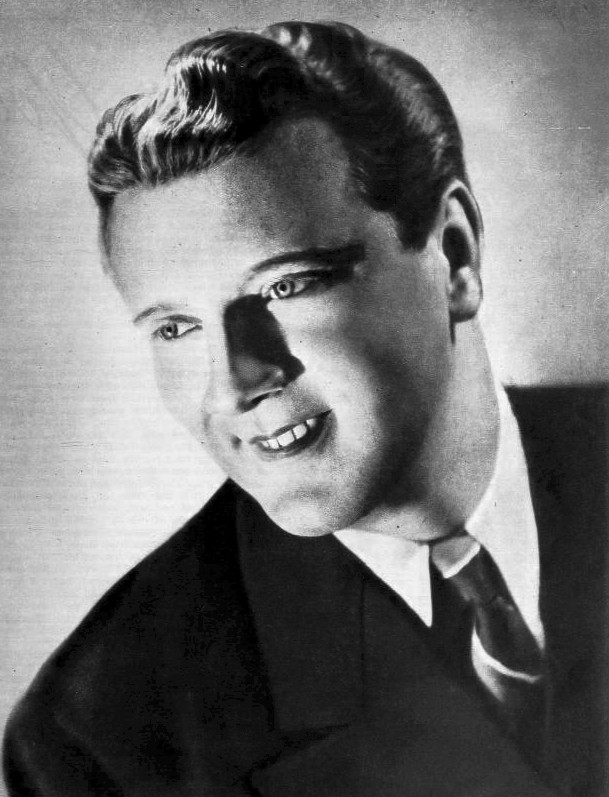
- Todd in 1942

Background information
- Also known as: Canadian Crosby
- Born: August 4, 1914; Montreal, Quebec, Canada
- Died: May 1973 (aged 58) New York City, New York, U.S.
- Genres: Pop singer; crooner
- Occupation: Singer
- Years active: 1933-1959
- Labels: RCA; Bluebird

Dick Todd (August 4, 1914 – May 1973) was a Canadian pop singer, most active from the 1930s to 1950s. He was nicknamed the Canadian Crosby, due to his supposed vocal similarity to Bing Crosby, and was born in Montreal.

== Early years ==
Todd sang in school programs as early as age 6. When he was 14, he worked as a log driver in a lumber camp.

His public schooling came at Macdonald Campus of McGill University and went on to study engineering at McGill. where he also played football. (Another source says that he was a music major at McGill.)

== Radio ==
Todd sang on a radio program in Canada in 1933.

After he came to the United States in 1938 to sing on broadcasts of Larry Clinton's orchestra, Todd became a favourite with radio listeners across the country.

During 1944–1945, Todd spent a year on a USO tour, entertaining troops during World War II. He returned to network radio July 28, 1945, on Your Hit Parade, replacing Lawrence Tibbett as the featured male singer, counterpart to Joan Edwards.

He was a soloist on programs such as Melody and Madness, Avalon Time, Rinso-Spry Vaudeville Theatre, Hometown Incorporated, and Show Boat.

== Recording ==
In the late 1930s, Todd signed a contract with RCA Victor to record for the company's Bluebird Records label. During his career he recorded such hits as "You're the Only Star in My Blue Heaven", "It's A Hap-Hap-Happy Day" and "Blue Orchids". In a 1940 magazine article, a writer commented, "He has the heaviest record-making schedule of any singer in the country."

=== Hit records ===
Year	Single	Chart positions				
Year	Single	US	US R&B	US AC	US Country	UK
1938	"The Girl in the Bonnet of Blue"	9	—	—	—	—
1938	"Love Doesn't Grow on Trees"	20	—	—	—	—
1938	"When Paw Was Courtin' Maw"	9	—	—	—	—
1939	"Little Sir Echo"	10	—	—	—	—
1939	"It's a Hundred to One (I'm in Love)"	12	—	—	—	—
1940	"To You, Sweetheart, Aloha"	10	—	—	—	—
1940	"The Gaucho Serenade"	4	—	—	—	—
1940	"Angel in Disguise"	13	—	—	—	—
1940	"The Singing Hills"	16	—	—	—	—
1940	"Make Believe Island"	14	—	—	—	—
1940	"All This and Heaven Too"	20	—	—	—	—
1940	"You Can't Brush Me Off" (with Dinah Shore)	24	—	—	—	—
1940	"Goodnight, Mother"	24	—	—	—	—
1950	"Daddy's Little Girl" (with Phil Ellis Choristers)	11	—	—	—	—
1953	"Till I Waltz Again with You	17	—	—	—	—

== Film ==
Todd made a couple of short features for Paramount Pictures.
