= Tomorrow Never Comes (Slim Whitman album) =

Studio album by Slim Whitman
- Released: 1970
- Genre: Country
- Label: United Artists
- Producer: Biff Collie, Scott Turner

Slim Whitman chronology
The Slim Whitman Christmas Album (1969)	Tomorrow Never Comes (1970)	Guess Who (1971)

Singles from Tomorrow Never Comes
- 1. "Tomorrow Never Comes" Released: 1970; 2. "Shutters and Boards" Released: 1970

Professional ratings
Review scores
Source	Rating
Billboard	Positive
The Encyclopedia of Popular Music	3/5 stars

Professional ratings
Straight from the Heart / Tomorrow Never Comes
Review scores
Source	Rating
AllMusic	3/5 stars

Tomorrow Never Comes is a studio album by Slim Whitman, released in 1970 on United Artists Records.

== Track listing ==
The album was issued in the United States by United Artists Records as a 12-inch long-playing record, catalog number UAS 6763.

Side one
No.	Title	Writer(s)	Length
1.	"Love Song of the Year"	Cindy Walker	2:27
2.	"Tomorrow Never Comes"	Ernest Tubb; Johnny Bond	2:32
3.	"I Pretend"	Barry Mason; Les Reed	2:43
4.	"My Heart Has a Mind of Its Own"	Howard Greenfield; Jack Keller	2:40
5.	"Moonlight on the Colorado"	Billy Moll; Robert King	2:55
6.	"Do What You Do, Do Well"	Ned Miller	2:10

Side two
No.	Title	Writer(s)	Length
1.	"You're Coming Home"	Albert Hammond	2:44
2.	"Shutters and Boards"	Audie Murphy; Scott Turner	2:37
3.	"A World Worth Living In"	Billy Reynolds; Clyde Pitts	2:50
4.	"Let Me Live Again"	Alex Zanetis	2:42
5.	"Come Take My Hand"	Kay O'Dwyer	2:37
6.	"Blue Canadian Rockies"	Cindy Walker	2:49
