= Smoke Signals (song) =

Single by Slim Whitman
- A-side: "Curtain of Tears" "Smoke Signals"
- Released: August 8, 1956
- Recorded: 1956
- Length: 2:35
- Label: Imperial
- Songwriter(s): Gene Evans

Slim Whitman singles chronology
"The Whiffenpoof Song" (1956)	"Smoke Signals" / "Curtain of Tears" (1956)	"Careless Love" (1957)

Professional ratings
Review scores
Source	Rating
Billboard	positive ("Spotlight" pick)

"Smoke Signals" is a song written by Gene Evans and recorded by Slim Whitman, who released it in 1956 as a single (Imperial X8308, with "Curtain of Tears" on the opposite side).

== Track listing ==
7-inch single (Imperial X8308, 1956, United States)
No.	Title	Writer(s)	Length
1.	"Curtain of Tears"	Cecil R. Harris; Arlie Carter	2:17
2.	"Smoke Signals"	Gene Evans	2:35

7-inch single (London Records 45-HL.P 8416, 1957, UK)
No.	Title	Writer(s)	Length
1.	"Curtain of Tears"	Harris; Carter	2:17
2.	"Smoke Signals"	G. Evans	2:35
