= Red River Valley (album) =

Studio album by Slim Whitman
- Released: 17 December 1976
- Genre: Country, folk
- Label: United Artists
- Producer: Alan Warner, Ken Barnes, Pete Drake

Slim Whitman chronology
The Very Best of Slim Whitman (1976)	Red River Valley (1976)	Home on the Range (1977)

Red River Valley is an album by American recording artist Slim Whitman, released on 17 December 1976. It was his second and final number-one album in the UK. It spent four weeks at the top of the chart in 1977; it kept David Bowie's Low off the top spot at the end of January 1977. The album was arranged by Whitman and Pete Moore. The cover photography was by Derek Richards.

== Track listing ==
1. "Rhinestone Cowboy" (Larry Weiss)
2. "Mr. Ting-A-Ling (Steel Guitar Man)" (George Morgan)
3. "Too Young" (Sidney Lippman, Sylvia Dee)
4. "Let Me Call You Sweetheart" (Beth Slater Whitson, Leo Friedman)
5. "(It's A) Small World" (Richard Sherman, Robert Sherman)
6. "Somewhere My Love (Lara's Theme) from Dr. Zhivago)" (Maurice Jarre, Paul Francis Webster)
7. "Una Paloma Blanca" (Hans Bouwens)
8. "Red River Valley" (Traditional; arranged by Pete Moore)
9. "My Elusive Dreams" (Billy Sherrill, Curly Putman)
10. "Cara Mia" (Bunny Lewis (credited here as Lee Lang), (Mantovani, under pen name Tulio Trapani)
11. "When the Moon Comes over the Mountain" (Harry M. Woods, Howard Johnson, Kate Smith)
12. "Now Is the Hour" (Dorothy Scott, Maewa Kaihau)

== Charts ==
=== Weekly charts ===
Chart (1977)	Peak position
Australian Albums (Kent Music Report)	81
New Zealand Albums (RMNZ)	18
UK Albums (Official Charts)	1

=== Year-end charts ===
Chart (1977)	Position
UK Albums (OCC)	18

== Certifications and sales ==
Region	Certification	Certified units/sales
United Kingdom (BPI)	Gold	100,000^{^}
^{^} Shipments figures based on certification alone.
