= Bandera Waltz =

"Bandera Waltz" is a song written by O. B. "Easy" Adams.

It is a Western cowboy ballad. According to the book Country Music USA, it talks about "the famous Bandera Stampede in Texas".

This was the first song released by the Texas Top Hands on their own Everstate record label in 1949. The song became a regional hit and has since been considered "a dance hall classic".

== Track listing ==
10-inch shellac record (Everstate C-101, 1949)
No.	Title	Writer(s)	Length
1.	"That's The Only Way"	John Currie	2:45
2.	"Bandera Waltz"	Easy Adams	2:45

== Jimmy Wakely version ==
Professional ratings
Review scores
Source	Rating
Billboard	positive

Jimmy Wakely released his rendition on Capitol in 1950 (cat. no. 1240, c/w "Pot o' Cold"). Billboard gave a positive review: "A sensational cowboy waltz is warbled to a turn by Wakely, smartly backed by smooth-playing combo."

== Slim Whitman version ==
"Bandera Waltz"

Single by Slim Whitman

from the album America's Favorite Folk Artist
- A-side: "Bandera Waltz" "End of the World"
- Released: 1952
- Genre: Country
- Length: 2:40
- Label: Imperial

Slim Whitman singles chronology
"Love Song of the Waterfall" / "My Love Is Growing Stale" (1949)	"Bandera Waltz" / "End of the World" (1952)	"Cold Empty Arms" / "In a Hundred Years or More" (1952)

Slim Whitman recorded his version, along with "Love Song of the Waterfall", "My Love Is Growing Stale", and "End of the World", in November 1951 at KWKH.

The first big hit ["Love Song of the Waterfall"] to be recorded at KWKH was by a yodeling tenor balladeer, Slim Whitman, who joined the Hayride in May 1950. Recently signed to Imperial Records, his day job as a postman prevented him from traveling to California for a recording session. Slim turned to Bob Sullivan in seeking a solution to his dilemma. "Sully, can you cut me a record?" The answer was in the affirmative with the proviso that the session could only take place when KWKH was off air. In November 1951 "Love Song of the Waterfall," "My Love Is Growing Stale," "Bandera Waltz," and "End of the World" were recorded one morning.

— Shreveport Sounds in Black and White

Whitman's first single for Imperial would be "Love Song of the Waterfall" coupled with "My Love Is Growing Stale", following by "Bandera Waltz" coupled with "End of the World".

=== Track listing ===
7-inch single (Imperial 45-8144, 1952, United States)
No.	Title	Writer(s)	Length
1.	"Bandera Waltz"	O. B. Easy Adams	2:40
2.	"End of the World"	Jerry Whitman	2:35

10-inch shellac record (London HL-1018, 1952, Australia)
No.	Title	Writer(s)	Length
1.	"Bandera Waltz"	Adams
2.	"My Love Is Growing Stale"	Lacy
