= Angel in Disguise (1940 song) =

Song
- Published: 1940
- Released: April 6, 1940
- Recorded: 1940
- Studio: Warner Bros. Entertainment
- Genre: big band
- Length: 2:25
- Songwriter: Kim Gannon
- Composers: Paul Mann and Stefan Weiss
- Lyricist: Ann Sheridan

"Angel In Disguise" is a 1940 pop hit from the Warner Bros. movie It All Came True with music by Paul Mann and Stefan Weiss and lyrics by Kim Gannon. It was sung in the movie by Ann Sheridan. It was also played during the opening credits and as background music and later it was reprised by the band at the night club and again sung by Ann Sheridan and chorus of waiters.

The tune became a staple of the Warner Bros. Looney Tunes shorts, including appearances in 1942's The Wabbit Who Came to Supper, 1943's Yankee Doodle Daffy, 1944's Angel Puss, and 1948's Back Alley Oproar.

Dick Todd had a hit version of it in 1940, reaching the No. 13 spot in the charts. Other versions in 1940 were by Bob Crosby & his Orchestra, Ozzie Nelson & His Orchestra, and by Horace Heidt and His Musical Knights (vocal by Larry Cotton). Gene Simmons also performed a vocal instrumental version (humming) of it in the 1986 action movie Never Too Young to Die.
