= There's a Love Knot in My Lariat =

"There's a Love Knot in My Lariat" (also sp. "There's a Love-Knot in My Lariat") is a song written and originally recorded by Canadian singer Wilf Carter (a.k.a. Montana Slim). It is considered one of his signature tunes and was inducted into the Canadian Songwriters Hall of Fame in 2007.

== History ==
Wilf Carter wrote this song in 1937. He recorded it on March 11, 1937, and released it on a 78-r.p.m. record (c/w "My Little Yoho Lady", Bluebird B 4619) in the same year.

== Lyrics ==
According to the song's profile on the Canadian Songwriters Hall of Fame website, it is "an honest expression of his feelings for his future wife and muse, Bobbie Bryan, and his longing for his Alberta prairie life".

== Slim Whitman version ==
"There's a Love Knot in My Lariat"

Single by Slim Whitman
- A-side: "I'm Casting My Lasso Towards the Sky" "There's a Love Knot in My Lariat"
- Released: 1956
- Label: London
- Songwriter: Wilf Carter

Slim Whitman UK singles chronology
"The Whiffenpoof Song" / "Dear Mary" (1956)	"I'm Casting My Lasso Towards the Sky" / "There's a Love Knot in My Lariat" (1956)	"I'll Take You Home Again, Kathleen" / "Careless Love" (1957)

Slim Whitman's rendition had a single release in the UK in December 1956 (London HL 8350, as the flip to "I'm Casting My Lasso Towards the Sky").

=== Track listing ===
10-inch 78-r.p.m. record (London HL-U.8350, 1956, UK)
No.	Title	Writer(s)	Length
1.	"I'm Casting My Lasso Towards the Sky"	Lee "Lasses" White; Jimmy Wakely
2.	"There's a Love Knot in My Lariat"	Carter; Harrington

== Other covers ==
In addition to Whitman, Alberta Slim, Frank Ifield, Judy Coder and Pride of the Prairie, Randy Hollar, Roger Tibbs, Brett Kissel, Teresa Endres are among the other artists who covered the song.
