= In Love the Whitman Way =

Studio album by Slim Whitman
- Released: 1968
- Genre: Country
- Label: Imperial
- Producer: Scott Turner

Slim Whitman chronology
| Country Memories (1967) | In Love the Whitman Way (1968) | Happy Street (1968) |

Singles from In Love the Whitman Way
- 1. "Rainbows Are Back in Style" Released: 1968

Professional ratings
Review scores
| Source | Rating |
|---|---|
| AllMusic | 3/5 stars |
| Billboard | Positive |
| The Encyclopedia of Popular Music | 4/5 stars |

In Love the Whitman Way is a studio album by Slim Whitman, released in 1968 on Imperial Records.

== Track listing ==
The album was issued in the United States by Imperial Records as a 12-inch long-playing record, catalog numbers LP-9375 (mono) and LP-12375 (stereo).

Arranged by Harol Bradley.

Side one
| No. | Title | Writer(s) | Length |
|---|---|---|---|
| 1. | "Rainbows Are Back in Style" | Dave Burgess | 2:30 |
| 2. | "Just Loving You" | Tom Springfield | 2:25 |
| 3. | "Yesterday's Roses" | Gene Autry; Fred Rose | 2:50 |
| 4. | "Walk Through This World with Me" | Sandra Seamons; Kaye Savage | 2:05 |
| 5. | "Unchained Melody" | Alex North; Hy Zaret | 3:00 |
| 6. | "Just A Few Sweet Kisses" | Slim Williams; Frank Hunter | 2:30 |

Side two
| No. | Title | Writer(s) | Length |
|---|---|---|---|
| 1. | "Little Green Valley" | Carson J. Robison | 2:30 |
| 2. | "South of the Border (Down Mexico Way)" | Michael Carr; Jimmy Kennedy | 2:45 |
| 3. | "My Heart Is in the Roses" | Charlie Tobias; Ray Joseph | 2:25 |
| 4. | "How Could I Not Love You" | Hal Blair; Dean Kay | 2:30 |
| 5. | "Jerry" | Scott Turner | 2:50 |
| 6. | "I'll Never Let You Cry" | Sidney Mitchell; Lew Pollack | 1:55 |

== Charts ==
| Chart (1968) | Peak position |
|---|---|
| US Top Country Albums (Billboard) | 16 |
