= Love Song of the Waterfall (album) =

Studio album by Slim Whitman
- Released: 1965
- Genre: Country
- Label: Imperial

Slim Whitman chronology
Country Songs / City Hits (1964)	Love Song of the Waterfall (1965)	Reminiscing (1965)

Singles from Love Song of the Waterfall
- 1. "Virginia" Released: 1964

Professional ratings
Review scores
Source	Rating
AllMusic	2/5 stars
Billboard	Positive
The Encyclopedia of Popular Music	4/5 stars

Love Song of the Waterfall is a studio album by Slim Whitman, released in 1965 on Imperial Records.

== Track listing ==
The album was issued in the United States and Canada by Imperial Records as a 12-inch long-playing record, catalog numbers LP-9277 (mono) and LP-12277 (stereo).

Side one
No.	Title	Writer(s)	Length
1.	"Love Song of the Waterfall"	Bob Nolan; Bernard Barnes; Carl Winge	2:30
2.	"You Belong to My Heart"	Agustín Lara; Ray Gilbert	1:50
3.	"In the Misty Moonlight"	Cindy Walker	2:00
4.	"Down in the Valley"	adapt. and arr. by Slim Whitman	2:17
5.	"Virginia"	Merle Kilgore	2:45
6.	"Melody of Love"	Hans Engelmann; Tom Glazer	2:08

Side two
No.	Title	Writer(s)	Length
1.	"Silver Threads Among the Gold"	adapt. and arr. by Slim Whitman	2:50
2.	"When I'm Gone, You'll Soon Forget"	Austin Keith	2:55
3.	"On the Sunny Side of the Rockies"	H. Tobias; R. Ingraham	2:14
4.	"My Heart Cries Out for You"	Sigman; Faith	2:17
5.	"Ah! Sweet Mystery of Life"	Rida Johnson Young; Victor Herbert	2:25
6.	"La golondrina (The Swallow)"	adapt. and arr. by Slim Whitman	2:19

== Charts ==
Chart (1965)	Peak position
US Top Country Albums (Billboard)	20
