= Happy Street =

Studio album by Slim Whitman
- Released: 1968
- Genre: Country
- Label: Imperial
- Producer: Scott Turner

Slim Whitman chronology
In Love the Whitman Way (1968)	Happy Street (1968)	Slim! (1969)

Singles from Happy Street
- 1. "Happy Street" Released: 1968; 2. "Livin' On Lovin' (and Lovin' Livin' with You)" Released: 1968; 3. "My Happiness" Released: 1969

Professional ratings
Review scores
Source	Rating
AllMusic	2/5 stars
Billboard	Positive
The Encyclopedia of Popular Music	3/5 stars

Happy Street is a studio album by Slim Whitman, released in 1968 on Imperial Records.

It is a "happy"-themed album.

== Track listing ==
The album was issued in the United States and Canada by Imperial Records as a 12-inch long-playing record, catalog number LP-12411 (stereo).

Side one
No.	Title	Writer(s)	Length
1.	"Happy Street"	Ben Peters	2:23
2.	"Heaven Says Hello"	Cindy Walker	1:51
3.	"You've Still Got a Place in My Heart"	Leon Payne	2:38
4.	"Star of Hope"	Harry Tobias; Phil Boutelje	2:06
5.	"My Heart Was Made for Loving You"	Ann Tygart	1:58
6.	"Something Pretty"	Buddy Wayne; Charlie Williams	2:37

Side two
No.	Title	Writer(s)	Length
1.	"When My Dreamboat Comes Home"	Cliff Friend; Dave Franklin	1:59
2.	"Livin' On Lovin' (And Lovin' Livin With You)"	Dave Burgess	2:20
3.	"My Blue Heaven"	George Whiting; Walter Donaldson	2:04
4.	"I Love You a Thousand Ways"	Jim Beck; Lefty Frizzell	2:36
5.	"My Happiness"	Betty Peterson; Borney Bergantine	2:25
6.	"Love Lanes of Yesterday"	Al Dexter; Link Davis	2:30

== Charts ==
Chart (1968)	Peak position
US Top Country Albums (Billboard)	34
