= I'll Do as Much for You Someday =

Single by Slim Whitman
- A-side: "I'm Casting My Lasso Towards the Sky" "I'll Do as Much for You Someday"
- Released: 1949
- Label: RCA Victor
- Songwriter(s): Ed G. Nelson; Ed Nelson Jr.

Professional ratings
Review scores
Source	Rating
Billboard	satisfactory

"I'll Do as Much for You Someday" is a song written by Ed G. Nelson and Ed Nelson Jr.

Slim Whitman recorded it for RCA Victor on February 3, 1949. It was released as a single, as the flip side to "I'm Casting My Lasso Towards the Sky", in April of the same year.

Billboard gave a "satisfactory" review, writing: "Okay ballad number here, with performance less than adequate."

== Track listing ==
10-inch 78-r.p.m. record (RCA Victor 21-0018, 1952, United States)
No.	Title	Writer(s)	Length
1.	"I'm Casting My Lasso Towards the Sky"	Lee "Lasses" White; Jimmy Wakely
2.	"I'll Do as Much for You Someday"	Ed G. Nelson; Ed Nelson Jr.

== Eddy Arnold version ==
In 1962, Eddy Arnold released his rendition on a single (RCA Victor 7984, "I'll Do As Much For You Someday" / "Tears Broke Out on Me"), but it was the other side that became successful.

== Track listing ==
10-inch 78-r.p.m. record (RCA Victor 47-7984, 1962, United States)
No.	Title	Writer(s)	Length
1.	"I'll Do as Much for You Someday"	Ed G. Nelson; Ed Nelson Jr.	2:50
2.	"Tears Broke Out on Me"	Hank Cochran	2:03
