= Slim Whitman Sings (1959 album) =

Studio album by Slim Whitman
- Released: 1959
- Genre: Country, traditional pop
- Label: Imperial

Slim Whitman chronology
Slim Whitman Sings (1957)	Slim Whitman Sings (1959)	I'll Walk with God (1959)

Singles from Slim Whitman Sings
- 1. "There's a Rainbow in Every Teardrop" Released: 1953; 2. "Singing Hills" Released: 1954; 3. "The Whiffenpoof Song" Released: 1956; 4. "Careless Love" Released: 1957; 5. "Unchain My Heart" Released: 1957

Professional ratings
Review scores
Source	Rating
AllMusic	3/5 stars
Billboard	3/4 stars
The Encyclopedia of Popular Music	4/5 stars

Slim Whitman Sings is a studio album by Slim Whitman, released in 1959 on Imperial Records.

== Release history ==
The album was issued in the United States by Imperial Records as a 12-inch long-playing record, catalog number LP-9064.

In November 1959, it was issued in the UK by London Records, catalog number HA-P 2199.

There is also a U.S. reissue under the title Country Favorites.

In 2012, the album was issued in the UK on CD by Hallmark Music & Entertainment, catalog number 712282.

== Track listing ==
Side one
No.	Title	Writer(s)	Length
1.	"Lovesick Blues"	Mills; Friend	2:50
2.	"Unchain My Heart"	L. Richard	2:05
3.	"Hush-A-Bye"	Scott; Belasco	2:05
4.	"Careless Love"	Williams; Handy; Koenig	2:20
5.	"The Whiffenpoof Song"	Minnegerode; Pomeroy; Galloway; Vallee	2:43
6.	"Blue Eyes Crying in the Rain"	Fred Rose	2:50

Side two
No.	Title	Length
1.	"When My Blue Moon Turns to Gold"	2:30
2.	"That Silver Haired Daddy of Mine"	2:50
3.	"A Petal from a Faded Rose"	2:25
4.	"I'll Never Take You Back Again"	2:50
5.	"Singing Hills"	2:25
6.	"There's a Rainbow in Every Teardrop"	2:39
