= I'm Casting My Lasso Towards the Sky =

Single by Slim Whitman
- A-side: "I'm Casting My Lasso Towards the Sky" "I'll Do as Much for You Someday"
- Released: April 1949
- Label: RCA Victor
- Songwriters: Lee "Lasses" White; Jimmy Wakely

Slim Whitman singles chronology
"I'm Casting My Lasso Towards the Sky" / "I'll Do as Much for You Someday" (1949)	"Please Paint a Rose on the Garden Wall" / "Tears Can Never Drown the Flame" (1949)

Slim Whitman singles chronology
"Danny Boy" / "There's a Rainbow In Every Teardrop" (1953)	"I'm Casting My Lasso Towards the Sky" / "There's a Rainbow in Ev'ry Teardrop" (1953)	"North Wind" / "Darlin' Don't Cry" (1953)

Slim Whitman UK singles chronology
"The Whiffenpoof Song" / "Dear Mary" (1956)	"I'm Casting My Lasso Towards the Sky" / "There's a Love Knot in My Lariat" (1956)	"I'll Take You Home Again, Kathleen" / "Careless Love" (1957)

Professional ratings
Review scores
Source	Rating
Billboard	satisfactory

"I'm Casting My Lasso Towards the Sky" is a song written by Lee "Lasses" White and Jimmy Wakely.

It is a Western-flavored yodeling song.

Slim Whitman recorded it as his debut single in April 1949 for RCA Victor. It was released as a single, with "I'll Do as Much for You Someday" on the b-side

== Lyrical and musical analysis ==
Lyrically, is a romantic cowboy song.

Timothy E. Wise in his book Yodeling and Meaning in American Music states that while Whitman didn't strictly fit the Western genre, "I'm Casting My Lasso Towards the Sky" is one of those songs of his that had a "vague Western feel" to its theme. He also observes that it combines "elements of Western-style bravura yodeling and Western imagery" with religious elements: the song imagines heaven as a range in the sky where people ride. "Imagining heaven as range riding in the sky is not too dissimilar from imagining the West generally as a kind of paradise, as it is depicted in so many romantic Western songs," he adds.

== History ==
In 1948, Slim Whitman signed with RCA Victor. It was his wife Jerry who suggested this song for his first recording session at the label that took place somewhere in 1948 or 1949. It was released as a single, with "I'll Do as Much for You Someday" on the flip side, in April 1949.

Billboard in its April 30 issue reviewed the single and rated it as "satisfactory", choosing "I'm Casting My Lasso Towards the Sky" as the better of the two sides. The comment on the song read: "Western yodellng and warbling with lively ork backing. Tune is not likely to appeal widely."

The song was a moderate success and became Whitman's theme song. It is now considered one of his classics.

After the singer hit it big on Imperial, RCA Victor hastily issued several singles with his old recordings for the label to cash off of his popularity. The 1953 RCA Victor single "I'm Casting My Lasso Towards the Sky" was even coupled with the same song as the then-latest Whitman's single for Imperial.

== Track listing ==
10-inch 78-r.p.m. record (RCA Victor 21-0018, 1949, United States)
No.	Title	Writer(s)	Length
1.	"I'm Casting My Lasso Towards the Sky"	Lee "Lasses" White; Jimmy Wakely
2.	"I'll Do as Much for You Someday"	Ed G. Nelson; Ed Nelson Jr.

7-inch single (RCA Victor 47-5431, 1953, United States)
No.	Title	Writer(s)	Length
1.	"I'm Casting My Lasso Towards the Sky"	Lee "Lasses" White; Jimmy Wakely
2.	"There's a Rainbow in Ev'ry Teardrop"	Erwin King; Slim Whitman

10-inch 78-r.p.m. record (London HL-U.8350, 1956, UK)
No.	Title	Writer(s)	Length
1.	"I'm Casting My Lasso Towards the Sky"	Lee "Lasses" White; Jimmy Wakely
2.	"There's a Love Knot in My Lariat"	Wilf Carter; Harrington
