= Once in a Lifetime (Slim Whitman album) =

Studio album by Slim Whitman
- Released: 1961
- Genre: Country
- Label: Imperial

Slim Whitman chronology
Just Call Me Lonesome (1960)	Once in a Lifetime (1961)	Slim Whitman Sings Annie Laurie (1961)

Singles from Once in a Lifetime
- 1. "Roll River Roll" Released: 1959; 2. "Wind" Released: 1960; 3. "Once in a Lifetime" Released: 1961

Professional ratings
Review scores
Source	Rating
AllMusic	3/5 stars
Billboard	4/4 stars
The Encyclopedia of Popular Music	3/5 stars

Once in a Lifetime is a studio album by Slim Whitman, released in 1961 on Imperial Records.

== Release history ==
The album was issued in the United States by Imperial Records as a 12-inch long-playing record, catalog number LP 9156 (mono).

Around 1966, it was reissued under the title Cool Water.

== Track listing ==
Side one
No.	Title	Writer(s)	Length
1.	"Roll River Roll"	J. Crist; W. Robbe	2:48
2.	"Cool Water"	Bob Nolan	2:49
3.	"Poor Little Angeline"		2:08
4.	"Wherever You Are"		2:11
5.	"Too Tired to Care"		2:21
6.	"Once in a Lifetime"		2:10

Side two
No.	Title	Writer(s)	Length
1.	"Twilla Lee"		2:32
2.	"The Letter Edged in Black"		2:46
3.	"River of Tears"		2:30
4.	"A Lonesome Hearth"		2:19
5.	"Wind"	Nolan	2:58
6.	"When I Call on You"		2:48
