= I'm a Lonely Wanderer =

Studio album by Slim Whitman
- Released: 1963
- Genre: Country
- Label: Imperial

Slim Whitman chronology
Heart Songs and Love Songs (1962)	I'm a Lonely Wanderer (1963)	Yodeling (1963)

Singles from I'm a Lonely Wanderer
- 1. "Backward, Turn Backward"

Professional ratings
Review scores
Source	Rating
AllMusic	3/5 stars
Billboard	Positive
The Encyclopedia of Popular Music	3/5 stars

I'm a Lonely Wanderer is a studio album by Slim Whitman, released in 1963 on Imperial Records.

== Track listing ==
The album was issued in the United States and Canada by Imperial Records as a 12-inch long-playing record, catalog number LP 9226 (mono).

Side one
No.	Title	Writer(s)	Length
1.	"Prisoner's Song"	Guy Massey	2:33
2.	"(I'm a) Lonely Wanderer"	Jerry Kennedy, Margie Singleton	1:55
3.	"What Kind of God (Do You Think You Are)"	Jimmie John	2:39
4.	"Cryin' for the Moon"	Richard	2:15
5.	"Tell Me"	Dixie Earl Bryant, Slim Whitman	2:37
6.	"You've Got Warm Lips (but a Cold Cold Heart)"	King	1:51

Side two
No.	Title	Writer(s)	Length
1.	"Backward Turn Backward (O Time in Your Flight)"	Dave Coleman	2:35
2.	"In a Hundred Years or More"	Jerry Crist	3:01
3.	"My Love Is Growing Stale"	Marvin Lacy	2:35
4.	"Since You've Gone"	Larry Mullins	2:40
5.	"Roundup in Glory"	Vep Ellis	2:35
6.	"Ride Away (with a Song in Your Heart)"	Gadus	2:23
