= Everything Leads Back to You =

Studio album by Slim Whitman
- Released: 1974
- Genre: Country
- Label: United Artists
- Producer: Pete Drake

Slim Whitman chronology
Happy Anniversary (1974)	Everything Leads Back to You (1974)	The Very Best of Slim Whitman (1976)

Singles from Everything Leads Back to You
- 1. "Everything Leads Back to You" Released: 1975; 2. "Mexicali Rose" Released: 1975

Professional ratings
Review scores
Source	Rating
The Encyclopedia of Popular Music	3/5 stars

Everything Leads Back to You is a studio album by Slim Whitman, released in 1971 on United Artists Records.

== Track listing ==
The album was issued in the United States by United Artists Records as a 12-inch long-playing record, catalog number UA-LA513-G.

Side one
No.	Title	Writer(s)	Length
1.	"Everything Leads Back to You"	Sorrells Pickard	3:32
2.	"Angel in an Apron"	Gary S. Paxton; Ron Hellard	2:49
3.	"I'm Beginning to Love You"	Claude Taylor; Brian Keith	2:10
4.	"Now Is the Hour"	Maewa Kaihau; Clement Scott; Dorothy Stewart	2:44
5.	"As You Take a Walk Through My Mind"	Roderick Taylor; Sheri Venturelli	3:10

Side two
No.	Title	Writer(s)	Length
1.	"Elizabeth (You're My Queen)"	Gary S. Paxton	2:32
2.	"Our Song"	Rachel Lane; Howard Thomas	2:28
3.	"Mexicali Rose"	Helen Stone; Jack Tenney	2:12
4.	"My Elusive Dreams"	Billy Sherrill; Curly Putman	3:08
5.	"Silver Spurs"	Gene Autry; Cindy Walker	2:17

== Charts ==
Chart (1975)	Peak position
US Top Country Albums (Billboard)	42
