= Guess Who (Slim Whitman album) =

Studio album by Slim Whitman
- Released: 1971
- Genre: Country
- Label: United Artists
- Producer: Pete Drake

Slim Whitman chronology
Tomorrow Never Comes (1970)	Guess Who (1971)	It's a Sin to Tell a Lie (1971)

Singles from Guess Who
- 1. "Guess Who" Released: 1971

Professional ratings
Review scores
Source	Rating
Billboard	Positive
The Encyclopedia of Popular Music	3/5 stars

Guess Who is a studio album by Slim Whitman, released in 1971 on United Artists Records.

== Track listing ==
The album was issued in the United States and Canada by United Artists Records as a 12-inch long-playing record, catalog number UAS 6783.

In the UK, it was released under the title Snowbird, catalog number UAS 29151.

Side one
No.	Title	Writer(s)	Length
1.	"From Heaven to Heartache"	Ben Peters	2:34
2.	"If Wishes Were Horses"	Lonnie Coleman; Bonnie Guitar	2:00
3.	"I'll Step Down"	Sid Tepper; Roy C. Bennett	2:03
4.	"Harbor Lights"	Jimmy Kennedy; Hugh Williams	2:52
5.	"It's My Lucky Day"	Jerry Foster; Bill Rice	1:51
6.	"When My Blue Moon Turns to Gold Again"	Wiley Walker; Gene Sullivan	2:12

Side two
No.	Title	Writer(s)	Length
1.	"Each Night at Nine"	Floyd Tillman	2:37
2.	"Guess Who"	J & J. Belvin	2:52
3.	"Stop and Think It Over"	Sid Tepper; Roy C. Bennett	2:04
4.	"Snowbird"	Gene MacLellan	2:05
5.	"Salina"	K. Roberts	2:08
6.	"What About You"	Johnny Wright; Jack Anglin	3:10

== Charts ==
Chart (1971)	Peak position
US Top Country Albums (Billboard)	31
