= Alan Jeffreys =

Australian cricketer

Personal information
- Born: 17 April 1913; Fremantle, Western Australia
- Died: 3 November 1943 (aged 30); Shipham, Somerset, England
- Source: Cricinfo, 27 September 2017

Alan Jeffreys (17 April 1913 – 3 November 1943) was an Australian cricketer. He played four first-class matches for Western Australia from 1937/38 to 1939/40.
