= Christmas with Slim Whitman =

Studio album by Slim Whitman
- Released: 1980
- Genre: Country, Christmas music
- Label: Cleveland International / Epic

Slim Whitman chronology
Songs I Love to Sing (Slim Whitman album) (1980)	Christmas with Slim Whitman (1980)	Mr. Songman (1981)

Singles from Christmas with Slim Whitman
- 1. "Where is the Christ in Christmas" Released: 1980

Professional ratings
Review scores
Source	Rating
AllMusic	3/5 stars
The Encyclopedia of Popular Music	2/5 stars

Christmas with Slim Whitman is a studio album by Slim Whitman, released in 1980 on Cleveland International Records.

== Track listing ==
The album was issued in the United States by CBS as a 12-inch long-playing record, catalog number Cleveland International / Epic JE 36847.

Side one
No.	Title	Writer(s)	Length
1.	"Let There Be Peace on Earth (Let It Begin with Me)"	Sy Miller; Jill Jackson	2:24
2.	"Away in a Manger"	Arr.: Slim Whitman	2:14
3.	"Silent Night, Holy Night"	Arr.: Slim Whitman	3:20
4.	"Where Is the Christ in Christmas"	Arr.: Slim Whitman	3:30
5.	"Sleep My Child (All Through the Night)"	Arr.: Slim Whitman	2:26

Side two
No.	Title	Writer(s)	Length
1.	"Christmas"	Jenny Lou Carson; Eddy Arnold	2:32
2.	"We Three Kings"	Arr.: Slim Whitman	3:34
3.	"The First Noel"	Arr.: Slim Whitman	3:35
4.	"It Came Upon a Midnight Clear"	Arr.: Slim Whitman	3:00
5.	"White Christmas"	Irving Berlin	3:39

== Charts ==
Chart (1980)	Peak position
US Top Country Albums (Billboard)	47
