= More than Yesterday (More Country Songs & City Hits) =

Studio album by Slim Whitman
- Released: 1965
- Genre: Country
- Label: Imperial

Slim Whitman chronology
Reminiscing (1965)	More than Yesterday (More Country Songs & City Hits) (1965)	God's Hand in Mine (1966)

Singles from More than Yesterday
- 1. "More than Yesterday" Released: 1965; 2. "The Twelfth of Never" Released: 1965

Professional ratings
Review scores
Source	Rating
AllMusic	3/5 stars
The Encyclopedia of Popular Music	3/5 stars

More than Yesterday (More Country Songs & City Hits) is a studio album by Slim Whitman, released in 1965 on Imperial Records.

It entered the Billboard country chart for one week in March 1966.

== Track listing ==
The album was issued in the United States and Canada by Imperial Records as a 12-inch long-playing record, catalog numbers LP-9303 (mono) and LP-12303 (stereo).

Side one
No.	Title	Writer(s)	Length
1.	"More than Yesterday"	L. Dickens	2:42
2.	"I'd Trade All of My Tomorrows"	Jenny Lou Carson	2:32
3.	"Beautiful, Beautiful Blue Eyes (I'll Never Love Brown Eyes Again)"	Alton Delmore; Jerry Capehart; Arthur Smith	2:15
4.	"I Went to Your Wedding"	Jessie Mae Robinson	2:30
5.	"Faded Love"	John Wills; Bob Wills	2:30
6.	"Maria Elena"	Lorenzo Barcelata; Sidney Keith Russell	2:25

Side two
No.	Title	Writer(s)	Length
1.	"So Long, Mary"	V. Cleary; A. Schwartz	2:18
2.	"The Twelfth of Never"	Jerry Livingston; Paul Francis Webster	2:15
3.	"A Satisfied Mind"	Red Hayes; Jack Rhodes	2:42
4.	"I Dreamed of an Old Love Affair"	B. Dodd; J. Davis; C. Mitchell	2:29
5.	"Take Me in Your Arms and Hold Me"	Cindy Walker	2:20
6.	"Tennessee Waltz"	Redd Stewart; Pee Wee King	2:25

== Charts ==
Chart (1966)	Peak position
US Top Country Albums (Billboard)	28
