= God's Hand in Mine =

Studio album by Slim Whitman
- Released: 1966
- Genre: Sacred
- Label: Imperial

Slim Whitman chronology
More than Yesterday (More Country Songs & City Hits) (1965)	God's Hand in Mine (1966)	A Travelin' Man (1966)

Professional ratings
Review scores
Source	Rating
AllMusic	3/5 stars
Billboard	Positive
The Encyclopedia of Popular Music	2/5 stars

God's Hand in Mine is a studio album by Slim Whitman, released in 1966 on Imperial Records.

== Release history ==
The album was issued in the United States by Imperial Records as a 12-inch long-playing record, catalog numbers LP 9308 (mono) and LP 12308 (stereo).

== Track listing ==
Side one
No.	Title	Writer(s)	Length
1.	"With God's Hand in Mine"	J. Fred Coots	3:05
2.	"He Bought My Soul at Calvary"	Stuart Hamblen	3:15
3.	"What a Friend We Have in Jesus"	Joseph M. Scriven - Charles Crozat Converse	2:37
4.	"He Reached Down His Hand"	Thoro Harris	3:05
5.	"A Miracle of Love"	Charles Weigle	2:35
6.	"Carried on the Shoulders of the Shepherd"	John W. Peterson	2:45

Side two
No.	Title	Writer(s)	Length
1.	"My Father Watches over Me"	H. G. Charles - William C. Martin	2:40
2.	"How Great Thou Art"	Stuart K. Hine	2:50
3.	"He Set My Tears to Music"	John W. Peterson	2:16
4.	"Who at My Door Is Standing"	M. B. C. Slade	2:50
5.	"He'll Understand and Say Well Done"	R. E. Winsett	2:30
6.	"The Love of God"	Leroy Crume	2:06
