= Home on the Range (album) =

Studio album by Slim Whitman
- Released: 1977
- Recorded: April 27–29, 1977
- Studio: Woodland (Nashville, Tennessee)
- Genre: Folk, World, Country
- Label: United Artists Records
- Producer: Alan Warner, Scott Turner (songwriter)

Slim Whitman chronology
Red River Valley (1977)	Home on the Range (1977)	Song I Love to Sing (1980)

Home on the Range is a 1977 folk, world and country music album recorded by Slim Whitman.

An album of standards from the three genres, it reached 2 in the UK Albums Chart in 1977 staying for thirteen weeks on the charts. It was a follow-up album to his Red River Valley, also successful in the UK in 1977.

== Track listing ==
Side One.

1. "Dear Heart" (Henry Mancini, Jay Livingston, Ray Evans)
2. "When You and I Were Young, Maggie" (James Austin Butterfield; arranged by Slim Whitman)
3. "Pearly Shells" (Webley Edwards)
4. "Down the River of Golden Dreams" (John Klenner, Nathaniel Shilkret)
5. "Top of the World" (John Bettis, Richard Carpenter)
6. "Rockin' Alone (In an Old Rockin' Chair)" (William York)

Side Two

1. "Home on the Range" (Traditional; arranged by Slim Whitman)
2. "Say You'll Stay Until Tomorrow" (Roger Greenaway, Barry Mason)
3. "Paper Roses" (Fred Spielman, Janice Torre)
4. "I'm So Lonesome" (Byron Keith)
5. "Diane" (Erno Rapee, Lew Pollack)
6. "I'll Be Home" (Ferdinand Washington, Stanley Lewis)
