= Heart Songs & Love Songs =

Heart Songs and Love Songs

Studio album by Slim Whitman
- Released: 1962
- Genre: Country
- Label: Imperial

Slim Whitman chronology
Slim Whitman Sings (1962)	Heart Songs and Love Songs (1962)	I'm a Lonely Wanderer (1963)

Singles from Heart Songs & Love Songs
- 1. "Blues Stay Away from Me" Released: 1962

Professional ratings
Review scores
Source	Rating
AllMusic	3/5 stars
Billboard	4/4 stars
The Encyclopedia of Popular Music	3/5 stars

Heart Songs and Love Songs (stylized as Heart Songs & Love Songs) is a studio album by Slim Whitman, released in 1962 on Imperial Records.

== Track listing ==
The album was issued in the United States and Canada by Imperial Records as a 12-inch long-playing record, catalog number LP 9209 (mono).

Side one
No.	Title	Writer(s)	Length
1.	"Blues Stay Away from Me"	Henry Glover; The Delmore Brothers; Wayne Raney	2:40
2.	"My Heart Is Broken in Three"	Carl Hoefle; Del Porter; Ray Glaser	2:45
3.	"Restless Heart"	Lew Spencer; Marilyn Keith	2:26
4.	"I Hate to See You Cry"	Deacon Anderson; Jerry Crist; Kid Murdock	2:27
5.	"You Have My Heart"	Crist	2:43
6.	"Cryin' for the Moon"	L. M. Richard	2:15

Side two
No.	Title	Writer(s)	Length
1.	"I Must Have Been Blind"	Claude Taylor; Crist	2:15
2.	"Riding the Range for Jesus"	Vep Ellis	2:51
3.	"Stairway to Heaven"	Jerry Herman; Kenneth Church	2:50
4.	"Why"	M. Lacy; Crist	2:35
5.	"Song of the Wild"	Lenny Siebert	2:40
6.	"At the Close of a Long Day"	Billy Moll; Johnny Marvin	2:35
