= Irish Songs the Slim Whitman Way =

Studio album by Slim Whitman
- Released: 1963
- Genre: Country
- Label: Imperial

Slim Whitman chronology
| Yodeling (1963) | Irish Songs the Slim Whitman Way (1963) | All-Time Favorites (1964) |

Singles from Irish Songs the Slim Whitman Way
- 1. "My Wild Irish Rose" Released: 1963

Professional ratings
Review scores
| Source | Rating |
|---|---|
| AllMusic | 2/5 stars |
| American Record Guide | Negative |
| The Encyclopedia of Popular Music | 2/5 stars |

Irish Songs the Slim Whitman Way is a studio album by Slim Whitman, released in 1963 on Imperial Records.

== Track listing ==
The album was issued in the United States and Canada by Imperial Records as a 12-inch long-playing record, catalog numbers LP 9245 (mono) and 12245 (stereo).

Side one
| No. | Title | Writer(s) | Length |
|---|---|---|---|
| 1. | "My Wild Irish Rose" | Chauncey Olcott | 2:31 |
| 2. | "Forty Shades of Green" | Johnny Cash | 2:12 |
| 3. | "Eileen" | M. Liebman; Sylvia Fine | 4:12 |
| 4. | "Galway Bay" | Arthur Colahan | 3:02 |
| 5. | "Dora, My Darling" | | 2:18 |
| 6. | "I'll Take You Home Again, Kathleen" | Thomas Westendorf | 2:38 |

Side two
| No. | Title | Writer(s) | Length |
|---|---|---|---|
| 1. | "Too Ra Loo Ra Loo Ral (That's an Irish Lullaby)" | James Shannon | 2:24 |
| 2. | "Gortnamona" | Percy French; Green | 2:54 |
| 3. | "The Stone Outside Dan Murphy's Door" | Johnny Patterson | 2:53 |
| 4. | "Londonderry Air" | Traditional | 3:00 |
| 5. | "Peggy O'Neil" | Harry Pease; Ed. G. Nelson; Gilbert Dodge | 1:57 |
| 6. | "Where the River Shannon Flows" | James J. Russell | 2:40 |
