= Reminiscing (Slim Whitman album) =

Studio album by Slim Whitman
- Released: 1965
- Genre: Country
- Label: Imperial
- Producer: Herb Shucher

Slim Whitman chronology
Love Song of the Waterfall (1965)	Reminiscing (1965)	More than Yesterday (More Country Songs & City Hits) (1965)

Singles from Reminiscing
- 1. "Reminiscing" Released: 1965

Professional ratings
Review scores
Source	Rating
AllMusic	3/5 stars
Billboard	Positive
The Encyclopedia of Popular Music	3/5 stars

Reminiscing is a studio album by Slim Whitman, released in 1965 on Imperial Records.

== Track listing ==
The album was issued in the United States and Canada by Imperial Records as a 12-inch long-playing record, catalog numbers LP-9288 (mono) and LP-12288 (stereo).

Side one
No.	Title	Writer(s)	Length
1.	"Reminiscing"	J. Halford; J. Austin
2.	"I'm Thinking Tonight of My Blue Eyes"	A. P. Carter
3.	"Please Help Me, I'm Falling"	Hal Blair; Don Robertson
4.	"Careless Hands"	Bob Hilliard; Carl Sigman
5.	"Tell Me Pretty Words"	R. Mansfield
6.	"Be Honest with Me"	Gene Autry; Fred Rose

Side two
No.	Title	Writer(s)	Length
1.	"Have You Ever Been Lonely"	Peter DeRose; George Brown
2.	"Mansion on the Hill"	Hank Williams; Fred Rose
3.	"Bells of Memory"	Roberts; Callahan
4.	"River of Tears"	V. Dawson
5.	"Since You're Gone"	L. Mullins
6.	"When I Grow Too Old to Dream"	Sigmund Romberg; Oscar Hammerstein II
