= It's a Sin to Tell a Lie (album) =

Studio album by Slim Whitman
- Released: 1971
- Genre: Country
- Label: United Artists
- Producer: Biff Collie

Slim Whitman chronology
Guess Who (1971)	It's a Sin to Tell a Lie (1971)	The Best of Slim Whitman (1972)

Singles from It's a Sin to Tell a Lie
- 1. "Something Beautiful (to Remember)" Released: 1971; 2. "It's a Sin to Tell a Lie" Released: 1971; 3. "The Loveliest Night of the Year" Released: 1971

Professional ratings
Review scores
Source	Rating
Billboard	Positive
The Encyclopedia of Popular Music	3/5 stars

It's a Sin to Tell a Lie is a studio album by Slim Whitman, released in 1971 on United Artists Records.

== Track listing ==
The album was issued in the United States by United Artists Records as a 12-inch long-playing record, catalog number UAS 6819.

Side one
No.	Title	Writer(s)	Length
1.	"It's a Sin to Tell a Lie"	B. Mayhew	2:14
2.	"Follow It"	E. Sinks; J. Chesnut	2:46
3.	"You, You, You"	Robert Mellin; Lotar Olias	2:20
4.	"One for You, One for Me"	Dave Burgess	2:26
5.	"Sunshine"	Tash Howard; Sandy Alpert	3:10
6.	"Near You"	Kermit Goell; Francis Craig	1:45

Side two
No.	Title	Writer(s)	Length
1.	"The Loveliest Night of the Year"	Irving Aaronson; Paul Francis Webster; Juventino Rosas	2:31
2.	"Something Beautiful (to Remember)"	Moneen Carpenter	2:53
3.	"That's Enough for Me"	B. J. Robinson	2:45
4.	"It Takes a Lot of Tenderness"	Alex Harvey	2:41
5.	"Red Wing"	Kerry Mills; Thurland Chattaway	2:18
6.	"Tammy"	Ray Evans; Jay Livingston	2:04

== Charts ==
Chart (1971)	Peak position
US Top Country Albums (Billboard)	23
