= Leo Friedman =

American composer

Leo Friedman (July 16, 1869 - March 7, 1927) was an American composer of popular music. Friedman was born in Elgin, Illinois and died in Chicago, Illinois. He is best remembered for composing the sentimental waltz "Let Me Call You Sweetheart" with lyrics by Beth Slater Whitson in 1910. Another popular composition was "Meet Me Tonight in Dreamland."

He also wrote the music for the popular ragtime song "Coon, Coon, Coon" in 1900. Lyrics were added by Gene Jefferson in 1901. The song was claimed to be the most successful song of 1901. It was published and promoted by "Sol Bloom, the Music Man" of Chicago.
