= North Wind (song) =

Single by Slim Whitman
- A-side: "North Wind" "Darlin' Don't Cry"
- Released: August 1953
- Recorded: 1953
- Genre: Country
- Length: 2:40
- Label: Imperial
- Songwriter(s): Rod Morris

Slim Whitman singles chronology
"I'm Casting My Lasso Towards the Sky" / "There's a Rainbow in Ev'ry Teardrop" (1953)	"North Wind" / "Darlin' Don't Cry" (1953)	"Stairway to Heaven" / "Lord, Help Me Be as Thou" (1953)

Audio
- "North Wind" on YouTube

Professional ratings
Review scores
Source	Rating
Billboard	positive ("New Records to Watch" pick)
Billboard	positive

"North Wind" is a song written by Rod Morris and originally recorded and released as a single (Imperial 45–8208, c/w "Darlin' Don't Cry") by Slim Whitman.

== Track listing ==
7-inch single (Imperial 45-8208, 1953, United States)
No.	Title	Writer(s)	Length
1.	"North Wind"	Rod Morris	2:40
2.	"Darlin' Don't Cry"	Jerry Crist	2:40

== Charts ==
Chart (1953)	Peak position
U.S. Billboard Top Country & Western Records — Most Played by Jockeys	8
