= Songs I Love to Sing (Slim Whitman album) =

Studio album by Slim Whitman
- Released: 1980
- Genre: Country
- Label: Cleveland International / Epic
- Producer: Pete Drake

Slim Whitman chronology
Till We Meet Again (1980)	Songs I Love to Sing (1980)	Christmas with Slim Whitman (1980)

Singles from Songs I Love to Sing
- 1. "When" Released: 1980; 2. "That Silver-Haired Daddy of Mine" Released: 1980; 3. "I Remember You" Released: 1980

Professional ratings
Review scores
Source	Rating
AllMusic	3/5 stars
The Encyclopedia of Popular Music	3/5 stars

Songs I Love to Sing is a studio album by Slim Whitman, released in 1980 on Cleveland International Records.

== Track listing ==
The album was issued in the United States by CBS as a 12-inch long-playing record, catalog number (Cleveland International / Epic JE 36768).

Side one
No.	Title	Writer(s)	Length
1.	"When"	Hans Bouwens	2:33
2.	"Secret Love"	Paul Francis Webster; Sammy Fain	2:45
3.	"Since You Went Away"	Byron Whitman	2:57
4.	"If I Could Only Dream"	Hans Bouwens	3:18
5.	"The Last Farewell"	Roger Whittaker; Ron A. Webster	3:52

Side two
No.	Title	Writer(s)	Length
1.	"I Remember You"	John Herndon Mercer; Victor Schertzinger	2:31
2.	"Rose Marie"	Rudolf Friml; Otto Harbach; Oscar Hammerstein II; Herbert Stothart	2:17
3.	"Where Do I Go from Here"	M. Metzger; B. Riley	2:55
4.	"That Silver-Haired Daddy of Mine"	Gene Autry; Jimmy Long	3:08
5.	"Beautiful Dreamer"	Stephen Foster (arr. by Slim Whitman)	2:58

== Charts ==
Chart (1980)	Peak position
US Top Country Albums (Billboard)	25
