= Country Memories (Slim Whitman album) =

Studio album by Slim Whitman
- Released: 1967
- Genre: Country
- Label: Imperial

Slim Whitman chronology
15th Anniversary Album (1967)	Country Memories (1967)	In Love the Whitman Way (1968)

Singles from Country Memories
- 1. "The Keeper of the Key" Released: 1967

Professional ratings
Review scores
Source	Rating
AllMusic	4.5/5 stars
Billboard	Positive
The Encyclopedia of Popular Music	3/5 stars

Country Memories is a studio album by Slim Whitman, released in 1967 on Imperial Records.

Billboard wrote in its review: "Always great, but never greater than now, Slim Whitman has a beautiful 'Broken Wings,' a haunting 'Hasta Luego,' and exceptional versions of the classic standards 'I Walk Alone' and 'Tears on My Pillow' in this chart package."

== Track listing ==
The album was issued in the United States and Canada by Imperial Records as a 12-inch long-playing record, catalog numbers LP-9356 (mono) and LP-12356 (stereo).

Side one
No.	Title	Writer(s)	Length
1.	"Broken Wings"	Bernhard Grun; John Jerome	2:25
2.	"Need You"	Johnny Blackburn; Lou Porter; Teepee Mitchell	2:20
3.	"Hasta Luego"	John Hicks	2:20
4.	"The Keeper of the Key"	Stewart; Howard; Devine; Guynes	2:35
5.	"I'll Never Pass This Way Again"	Dale Parker	3:01
6.	"Chained to a Memory"	Jenny Lou Carson	2:39

Side two
No.	Title	Writer(s)	Length
1.	"Yearning (Just for You)"	Benny Davis; Joe Burke	2:26
2.	"Kentucky Waltz"	Bill Monroe	2:15
3.	"Roses Are Red (My Love)"	Al Byron; Paul Evans	2:30
4.	"Don't Be Angry"	Wade Jackson	2:55
5.	"I Walk Alone"	Herbert Wilson	2:20
6.	"Tears on My Pillow"	Leon Holmes	2:20

== Charts ==
Chart (1967)	Peak position
US Top Country Albums (Billboard)	42
