= Oak Park (Tampa) =

- Neighborhood
- Location within the state of Florida
- Coordinates: 27°58′8″N 82°23′56″W
- Country: United States
- State: Florida
- County: Hillsborough
- City: Tampa
- Time zone: UTC-5 (Eastern (EST))
  - Summer (DST): UTC-4 (EDT)
- ZIP codes: 33605

Oak Park is a neighborhood within the city limits of Tampa, in the U.S. state of Florida. The ZIP Code which serves the neighborhood is 33605. The neighborhood is part of the East Tampa region and is located within District Five of the Tampa City Council.

== Geography ==
Oak Park is located at latitude 27.969 North, and longitude 82.399 West. The elevation is 36 feet above sea level. Boundaries are roughly Columbus Drive to the north, Broadway to the south and 50th Street to the west.

== Education ==
Oak Park is served by Hillsborough County Public Schools, which serves the city of Tampa and Hillsborough County. Oak Park Elementary, Franklin Middle School, and Middleton High School all serve the neighborhood

== See also ==
- Neighborhoods in Tampa, Florida
