= Happy Anniversary (album) =

Studio album by Slim Whitman
- Released: 1974
- Genre: Country
- Label: United Artists
- Producer: Kelso Herston

Slim Whitman chronology
25th Anniversary Concert (1973)	Happy Anniversary (1974)	Everything Leads Back to You (1975)

Singles from Happy Anniversary
- 1. "It's All in the Game" Released: February 1974; 2. "Happy Anniversary" Released: August 1974

Professional ratings
Review scores
Source	Rating
Billboard	Positive
The Encyclopedia of Popular Music	3/5 stars

Happy Anniversary is a studio album by Slim Whitman, released in 1974 on United Artists Records.

== Track listing ==
The album was issued in the United States by United Artists Records as a 12-inch long-playing record, catalog number UA-LA319-R.

Side one
No.	Title	Writer(s)	Length
1.	"Happy Anniversary"	Gary S. Paxton	2:31
2.	"She Thinks I Still Care"	Dickey Lee	2:54
3.	"Hello Love"	Betty Jean Robinson; Aileen Mnich	2:45
4.	"There Goes My Everything"	Dallas Frazier	2:43
5.	"Room Full of Roses"	Tim Spencer	2:47
6.	"Making Believe"	Jimmy Work	2:34

Side two (US, cat. no. UA-LA319-R)
No.	Title	Writer(s)	Length
1.	"It's All in the Game"	Carl Sigman; Gen. Charles G. Dawes	2:17
2.	"If You Love Me (Let Me Know)"	John Rostill	3:12
3.	"The Most Beautiful Girl"	Norro Wilson; Billy Sherrill; Rory Bourke	2:23
4.	"What I Had With You"	Curly Putman; Sonny Throckmorton	2:35
5.	"Honeymood Feelin'"	Ron Hellard; Gary S. Paxton	2:59

Side two (Europe, cat. no. UAS 29670)
No.	Title	Writer(s)	Length
1.	"It's All in the Game"		2:17
2.	"If You Love Me (Let Me Know)"		3:12
3.	"Hold Me"	Ray Griff
4.	"The Most Beautiful Girl"		2:23
5.	"What I Had With You"		2:35
6.	"Easy Lovin'"	Freddie Hart	2:36

== Charts ==
Chart (1974)	Peak position
UK Albums (OCC)	44

== Certifications ==
Region	Certification	Certified units/sales
United Kingdom (BPI)	Silver	60,000^{^}
^{^} Shipments figures based on certification alone.
