= Slim Whitman Sings (1962 album) =

Studio album by Slim Whitman
- Released: 1962
- Genre: Country
- Label: Imperial

Slim Whitman chronology
Forever (1962)	Slim Whitman Sings (1962)	Heart Songs and Love Songs (1962)

Singles from Slim Whitman Sings
- 1. "The Wayward Wind" Released: 1962; 2. "Love Letters in the Sand" Released: 1962?

Professional ratings
Review scores
Source	Rating
AllMusic	3/5 stars
Billboard	4/4 stars

Slim Whitman Sings is a studio album by Slim Whitman, released in 1962 on Imperial Records.

In the UK, the album was titled Slim Whitman Sings—Vol. 4, as there have been several albums bearing the title Slim Whitman Sings before.

== Release history ==
The album was issued in the United States by Imperial Records as a 12-inch long-playing record, catalog numbers LP-9194 (mono) and LP-12194 (stereo).

In October 1962, it was issued under the title Slim Whitman Sings—Vol. 4 in the UK by London Records, catalog number HA-P 8013.

There is also a U.S. reissue under the title Anytime.

== Track listing ==
Side one
No.	Title	Writer(s)	Length
1.	"Love Letters in the Sand"		2:03
2.	"Anytime"	H. Lawson	2:07
3.	"Tammy"	Jay Livingston; Ray Evans	2:43
4.	"The Wayward Wind"		2:27
5.	"Send Me the Pillow (That You Dream On)"		2:33
6.	"Valley of Tears"	Antoine Domino; Dave Bartholomew	2:05

Side two
No.	Title	Writer(s)	Length
1.	"I'm Walking Behind You"	Billy Reid	2:33
2.	"You You You"	Mellin; Olias	2:08
3.	"Just Out of Reach (of My Two Open Arms)"	Stewart	2:54
4.	"There's a Gold Mine in the Sky"	Kenny	2:25
5.	"I Forgot More Than You'll Ever Know (About Her)"	Null	2:27
6.	"We Live in Two Different Worlds"	Fred Rose	2:10
