= Slim Whitman Sings (1957 album) =

Studio album by Slim Whitman
- Released: 1957
- Genre: Country
- Label: Imperial

Slim Whitman chronology
Slim Whitman Favorites (1954)	Slim Whitman Sings (1957)	Slim Whitman Sings (1958)

Singles from Slim Whitman Sings
- 1. "All That I'm Asking Is Sympathy" Released: 1953; 2. "Roll On Silvery Moon" Released: 1955; 3. "Tumbling Tumbleweeds" Released: 1956; 4. "Serenade" Released: 1956; 5. "I'll Take You Home Again, Kathleen" Released: 1957

Professional ratings
Review scores
Source	Rating
Billboard	Positive
The Encyclopedia of Popular Music	4/5 stars

Slim Whitman Sings is a studio album by Slim Whitman, released in early 1957 on Imperial Records.

== Release history ==
The album was issued in the United States by Imperial Records as a 12-inch long-playing record, catalog number LP 9026.

Around 1966, it was reissued under the title Country Hits, Volume 1.

== Track listing ==
Side one
No.	Title	Writer(s)	Length
1.	"By the Waters of the Minnetonka"	J. M. Cavanass; T. Lieurance
2.	"All That I'm Asking Is Sympathy"	B. Davis; J. A. Burke
3.	"Dear Mary"	D. Bartholomew; P. King
4.	"I'll Take You Home Again, Kathleen"	Arranged by J. Crist
5.	"Serenade"	N. Brodsky; S. Cahn
6.	"Tumbling Tumbleweeds"	B. Nolan

Side two
No.	Title	Writer(s)	Length
1.	"When I Grow Too Old to Dream"	O. Hammerstein; S. Romberg
2.	"Curtain of Tears"	Carter; Harris
3.	"I'm Casting a Lasso Towards the Sky"	Wakely; White
4.	"Haunted Hungry Heart"	Carter; Harris; Heap
5.	"Roll On Silvery Moon"	M. Keefe
6.	"We Stood at the Altar"	J. M. Robinson
