= Slim Whitman Sings (1958 album) =

Studio album by Slim Whitman
- Released: 1958
- Genre: Country
- Label: Imperial

Slim Whitman chronology
Slim Whitman Sings (1957)	Slim Whitman Sings (1958)	Slim Whitman Sings (1959)

Singles from Slim Whitman Sings
- 1. "Careless Hands" Released: 1957; 2. "Candy Kisses" Released: 1958; 3. "Put Your Trust in Me" Released: 1958; 4. "At the End of Nowhere" Released: 1958

Professional ratings
Review scores
Source	Rating
AllMusic	3/5 stars
The Encyclopedia of Popular Music	4/5 stars

Slim Whitman Sings is a studio album by Slim Whitman, released in 1958 on Imperial Records.

== Release history ==
The album was issued in the United States by Imperial Records as a 12-inch long-playing record, catalog number LP.9056.

In January 1959, it was issued in the UK by London Records, catalog number HA-P.2139.

In 1966, it was reissued in the United States in stereo under the title My Best to You, catalog number LP-12105.

== Track listing ==
Side one
No.	Title	Writer(s)	Length
1.	"Put Your Trust in Me"	Dewar; Lampert
2.	"When It's Springtime in the Rockies"	Sauer
3.	"At the End of Nowhere"	Clements
4.	"Mexicali Rose"	Stone; Tenney
5.	"My Best to You"	Willadsen; Jones
6.	"Cowpoke"	Jones

Side two
No.	Title	Writer(s)	Length
1.	"A Very Precious Love"	Webster; Fain
2.	"Careless Hands"	Hilliard; Sigman
3.	"Among My Souvenirs"	Leslie; Nicholls
4.	"In the Valley of the Moon"	Tobias; Burke
5.	"Candy Kisses"	Morgan
6.	"Tormented"	Rotella; Gilbert
