= Just Call Me Lonesome (Slim Whitman album) =

Studio album by Slim Whitman
- Released: 1961
- Genre: Country
- Label: Imperial

Slim Whitman chronology
Slim Whitman's First Visit to Britain (1960)	Just Call Me Lonesome (1961)	Once in a Lifetime (1961)

Singles from Just Call Me Lonesome
- 1. "Ramona" Released: 1961; 2. "Just Call Me Lonesome" Released: 1961; 3. "The Bells That Broke My Heart" Released: 1961

Professional ratings
Review scores
Source	Rating
AllMusic	3/5 stars
The Encyclopedia of Popular Music	3/5 stars

Just Call Me Lonesome is a studio album by Slim Whitman, released in 1961 on Imperial Records.

== Track listing ==
The album was issued in the United States by Imperial as a 12-inch long-playing record, catalog numbers LP-9137 (mono) and LP-12137 (stereo).

There is also a U.S. reissue under the title Portrait.

Side one
No.	Title	Writer(s)	Length
1.	"Vaya con Dios"	Larry Russell; Inez James; Buddy Pepper
2.	"Just Call Me Lonesome"	Rex Griffin
3.	"It's a Sin"	Fred Rose; Zeb Turner
4.	"I Love You Because"	Leon Payne
5.	"Sail Along Silv'ry Moon"	Harry Tobias; Percy Wenrich
6.	"(Remember Me) I'm the One Who Loves You"	Stuart Hamblen

Side two
No.	Title	Writer(s)	Length
1.	"Ramona"	L. Wolfe Gilbert; Mabel Wayne
2.	"The Old Lamplighter"	Charles Tobias; Nat Simon
3.	"I'd Climb the Highest Mountain"	Lew Brown; Sidney Clare
4.	"For All We Know"	Sam Lewis; J. Fred Coots
5.	"The Bells That Broke My Heart"	Mark Rollins; Jack Rollins
6.	"I'll Do as Much for You Some Day"	Ed Nelson; Ed Nelson, Jr.
