= Happy Anniversary (Slim Whitman song) =

Single by Slim Whitman

from the album Happy Anniversary
- B-side: "What I Had with You"
- Released: 1974
- Recorded: 1974
- Genre: Country
- Length: 2:31
- Label: United Artists
- Songwriter(s): Gary S. Paxton
- Producer(s): Kelso Herston

Slim Whitman singles chronology
"It's All in the Game" (1974)	"Happy Anniversary" (1974)	"Foolish Question" (1974)

"Happy Anniversary" is a song by Slim Whitman.

In the UK, where this song was released as a single (coupled with "What I Had with You"), it charted for ten weeks in October–December 1974, peaking at number 14.

In the United States, it did not receive a commercial single release.

The song gave its title to Whitman's 1974 album Happy Anniversary.

== Writing ==
The song was written by Gary S. Paxton.

== Track listing ==
7-inch single (1974, Europe, Australia and New Zealand)
No.	Title	Writer(s)	Length
1.	"Happy Anniversary"	Gary S. Paxton	2:31
2.	"What I Had with You"	Curly Putnam; S. Throckmorton	2:35

7-inch promotional single (United Artists UA-XW530-X, 1974, United States)
No.	Title	Writer(s)	Length
1.	"Happy Anniversary" (stereo)	G. S. Paxton	2:31
2.	"Happy Anniversary" (mono)	G. S. Paxton	2:31

== Charts ==
Chart (1974)	Peak position
UK Singles (OCC)	14
