= Singing Hills =

Single by Slim Whitman
- A-side: "Singing Hills" "I Hate to See You Cry"
- Released: March 1, 1954
- Genre: Country
- Length: 2:25
- Label: Imperial
- Songwriter(s): Mack David, Dick Sanford and Sammy Mysels

Slim Whitman singles chronology
"Beautiful Dreamer" (1954)	"Singing Hills" / "I Hate to See You Cry" (1954)	"The Cattle Call" / "Roll On Silvery Moon" (1955)

Professional ratings
Review scores
Source	Rating
Billboard	positive ("Spotlight" pick)
Billboard	positive

"Singing Hills" is a song written by Mack David, Dick Sanford, and Sammy Mysels. As "The Singing Hills" it was very popular in 1940 with both Bing Crosby (No 3 in the charts) and Dick Todd (No.16) having hits with it.

Slim Whitman released it as a single (Imperial 8267, with "I Hate to See You Cry" on the flip side) in 1954.

== Track listing ==
7-inch single (Imperial X8267, 1954, United States)
No.	Title	Writer(s)	Length
1.	"Singing Hills"	Mack David, Dick Sanford and Sammy Mysels	2:25
2.	"I Hate to See You Cry"	Deacon Anderson, Kid Murdock and Jerry Crist	2:35

7-inch single (London Records 45-HL8091, 1954, UK)
No.	Title	Length
1.	"Singing Hills"
2.	"I Hate to See You Cry"

== Charts ==
Chart (1954)	Peak position
U.S. Billboard Top Country & Western Records	4
