= Wilf Carter (musician) =

Canadian singer and yodeler (1904–1996)

Background information
- Also known as: Montana Slim, The Yodelling Cowboy
- Born: Wilfred Arthur Charles Carter; December 18, 1904; Port Hilford, Nova Scotia, Canada
- Origin: Calgary, Alberta, Canada
- Died: December 5, 1996 (aged 91) Scottsdale, Arizona, U.S.
- Genres: Country, western
- Occupations: Singer; songwriter; musician
- Instruments: Vocals, guitar
- Years active: 1929–1991
- Labels: RCA Victor, Bluebird Records
- Formerly of: Hank Snow, Slim Whitman

Wilfred Arthur Charles Carter (December 18, 1904 – December 5, 1996), professionally known as Wilf Carter in his native Canada and also as Montana Slim in the United States, was a Canadian singer, songwriter, guitarist, and yodeller. Carter was said to have pioneered the transitional bridge between authentic cowboy folk music and the carefully composed romantic Hollywood singing cowboy genre.

In 1984, He was inducted into the Canadian Country Music Hall of Fame He wrote over 500 songs, and is an inductee to the Canadian Songwriters Hall of Fame

In 1971, Wilf Carter was inducted into the Nashville Songwriters Hall of Fame. Widely acknowledged as the father of Canadian country music, Carter was Canada's first country music star, inspiring a generation of young Canadian performers.

== Early years ==
Carter was born in Port Hilford, Nova Scotia, Canada. One of nine children, his father was Swiss. He began working odd jobs by the age of eight in Canning, Nova Scotia, but started singing after seeing a traveling Swiss performer named "The Yodelling Fool" in Canning. Carter left home at the age of 15 after a falling out with his father, who was a Baptist minister.

In 1923, at age 18, after working as a lumberjack and singing with hobos in boxcars, Carter moved west to Calgary, Alberta, where he became friends with Pete Knight and found work on the Davis ranch, near Brooks, as a cowboy. (In 1979, Carter was the grand marshal at the Calgary Stampede.) He made extra money singing and playing his guitar at dances, camps, performing for tourist parties, and traveling throughout the Canadian Rockies. It was during this time that he developed his own yodelling style, sometimes called an "echo yodel" or a "three-in-one".

== Radio years (1929–1940) ==
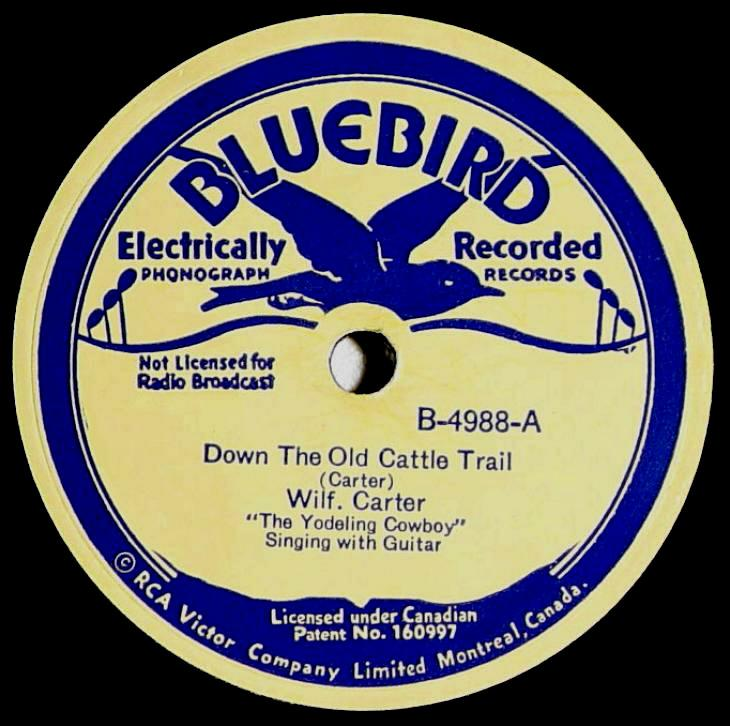
"Down the Old Cattle Trail" by Wilf Carter

Carter performed his first radio broadcast on CFCN Alberta in 1929. Soon after, he was heard locally on CFAC and nationally on the CRBC. Two years later, he was entertaining tourists as a trail rider for the Canadian Pacific Railway, who promoted horseback excursions into the Canadian Rockies. Carter soon became very popular in the region.

In 1933, he was hired as an entertainer on the maiden voyage of the British ship S.S. Empress. Later that year, he stopped off in Montreal and made his first recording: "My Swiss Moonlight Lullaby" and "The Capture of Albert Johnson". After signing with the Canadian branch of RCA Victor, "My Swiss Moonlight Lullaby" became the first hit record ever by a Canadian country performer. That same year, Carter also wrote and recorded "Pete Knight, The King of the Cowboys," which also became a hit.

For seven years (1934-1940) he hosted his own CBS country music radio program in New York City. His announcer was Bert Parks. CBS changed his name to "Montana Slim," to appeal to American audiences. In 1935, Carter also performed on WABC radio. In 1937, Carter returned to Alberta, where he purchased a ranch. He continued to appear on CBC, NBC, and CBS until CBS dropped him in 1940.

In 1940, Carter seriously injured his back in a car accident in Montana. He was unable to perform for much of the decade, but his popularity was sustained by the periodic release of new recordings.

== Recording sessions ==
He had a recording contract with RCA-Victor for five years (1947-1952) and then moved to Nashville where he recorded with Decca from 1954 to 1957.

He sold his ranch in 1949 and moved his family to a 180 acres (73 ha) farm in New Jersey.

== Touring (1949–1991) ==
In 1949, Carter resumed live performances with tours in Canada and the United States. In 1950, he attracted over 50,000 people during a week at the Canadian National Exhibition bandstand in Toronto, Ontario.

In 1953, Wilf Carter started touring with his own show called, 'The Family Show with the Folks You Know.' His daughters, Carol and Sheila, worked with him as dancers and back-up singers.

In 1964, Carter performed for the first time at the Calgary Stampede. He also became one of the most requested guests on the TV show hosted by Canadian country singer Tommy Hunter.

In the 1960s and 70s he toured with Hank Snow.

In 1980, Country Music Queen Kitty Wells and her husband Johnnie Wright encouraged Carter to tour with them, which was billed as Carter's 80th Birthday Tour. From 1980 to 1985 he toured different parts of Canada.

In 1985, Carter toured with Slim Whitman.

In 1991 Wilf toured across Canada in his 'Farewell Tour' aptly title "The Last Round-Up"

== Recordings ==
Wilf Carter recorded over 40 original and compilation LP records for RCA Victor including Nuggets of the Golden West, Christmas in Canada, Songs of the Rail and Range, Songs of Australia, Wilf Carter Sings Jimmie Rogers, and Let's Go Back to the Bible. In 1983, he re-recorded many of his most popular songs for Fifty Golden Years.

In 1988, Carter recorded his last album, What Ever Happened to All Those Years. In 1991, at age 86, he made his last concert tour, appropriately called 'The Last Round-up Tour', with shows throughout Nova Scotia, New Brunswick, Ontario, and Manitoba. He retired the following year, due to his loss of hearing. Wilf Carter died in 1996 in Scottsdale, Arizona, 13 days before his 92nd birthday.

== Business ==
In 1952, he moved, this time to Orlando, Florida, where he opened the Wilf Carter Motor Lodge, a venture that lasted only two years.

== Honours and awards ==
In 1971, Wilf Carter was inducted into the Nashville Songwriters Hall of Fame.

He was inducted into the Canadian Country Music Hall of Fame in 1984, and the following year, he was inducted into the Canadian Music Hall of Fame and the Juno Awards Hall of Fame.

He was made an Honorary Chief of the Stony Indian tribe.

A video documentary was released in 2000, called The Last Round-up: The Wilf Carter Story, which examined Carter's distinguished career.

== Legacy ==
He wrote hundreds of songs covering a wide range of themes, including traditional country western, cowboy, folk, and hobo songs. His recordings of "Blue Canadian Rockies" and "You Are My Sunshine" are among the most popular. Fellow Canadian country artist Ian Tyson considers Carter an influence on his music. Another Canadian artist, Stu Davis, acknowledged the importance of Carter's mentorship early in his career and credited him with securing Davis's first recording contract with Sonora Records in New York.

== Discography ==
Year	Album	CAN Country
1960	The Dynamite Trail	
1960	Songs of the Calgary Stampede	
1962	Reminiscin' with Wilf Carter	
1962	By Request	
1963	Old Prairie Melodies	
1964	Let's Go Back to the Bible	
1964	Nuggets of the Golden West	
1965	Christmas in Canada	
1965	Yodeling Memories	
1965	32 Wonderful Years	
1966	God Bless Our Canada	
1966	Golden Memories	
1967	If It Wasn't for the Farmer What Would City Slickers Do?	
1967	Waitin' for the Maple Leaves to Fall	
1968	Hittin' the Track	
1968	How My Yodeling Days Began	
1968	Songs of the Rail and Range	
1969	The Best of Wilf Carter	
1969	Balladeer of the Golden West	
1969	Wilf Carter Sings Jimmie Rodgers	
1970	Sings Songs of Australia	
1970	Away Out There	
1971	Walls of Memory	
1972	My Heartache's Your Happiness	
1973	40th Anniversary Special	
1973	Wilf Carter's Best / Wilf Carter's West	
1974	The Wilf Carter Souvenir Album	
1978	Walkin the Streets of Calgary	
1979	I'm Happy To-day	
1980	My Home on the Range	14

=== Charted singles ===
Year	Single	CAN Country	Album
1973	"Shoo Shoo Shoo Sha-La-La"	60	My Heartache's Your Happiness
1976	"Have a Nice Day"	27	Have a Nice Day
1988	"What Ever Happened"	91	What Ever Happened

=== Other singles ===
- "There's a Love Knot in My Lariat" (1937)
