= Slim Whitman Sings Annie Laurie =

Studio album by Slim Whitman
- Released: 1961
- Genre: Country
- Label: Imperial

Slim Whitman chronology
Once in a Lifetime (1961)	Slim Whitman Sings Annie Laurie (1961)	Forever (1962)

Singles from Slim Whitman Sings Annie Laurie
- 1. "The Old Spinning Wheel" Released: 1961; 2. "It Sure Looks Lonesome Outside" Released: 1961; 3. "Annie Laurie" / "Valley of Tears" Released: 1961 or 1962

Professional ratings
Review scores
Source	Rating
AllMusic	3/5 stars
Billboard	4/4 stars
The Encyclopedia of Popular Music	3/5 stars

Slim Whitman Sings Annie Laurie is a studio album by Slim Whitman, released in late 1961 on Imperial Records.

In the UK, the album was titled Slim Whitman Sings—Vol. 3, as there have been several albums bearing the title Slim Whitman Sings before.

== Release history ==
The album was issued in the United States by Imperial Records as a 12-inch long-playing record, catalog numbers LP-9163 (mono) and LP-12077 (stereo).

In 1962, it was issued, under the title, Slim Whitman Sings—Vol. 3, in the UK by London Records, catalog numbers HA-P 2443 (mono) and SAH-P 6232 (stereo).

Around 1966, it was reissued in the United States by Imperial under the title Sweeter than the Flowers.

== Track listing ==
Side one
No.	Title	Writer(s)	Length
1.	"Sweeter than the Flowers"	Ervin Rouse; Lois Mann; Morry Burns
2.	"Blue Eyes Crying in the Rain"	Fred Rose
3.	"Eileen"	Max Liebman; Sylvia Fine
4.	"Straight from Heaven"	Jim Glaser
5.	"Most Beautiful"	Glenn Barber
6.	"Molly Darlin'"	Jerry Crist

Side two
No.	Title	Writer(s)	Length
1.	"It Sure Looks Lonesome Outside"	Gary Bruce
2.	"Annie Laurie"	Crist
3.	"The Old Spinning Wheel"	Billy Hill
4.	"In a Hundred Years"	Jimmy Lee Dickens; Larry Kirby
5.	"Yesterday's Love"	Jim Glaser
6.	"Ten Thousand Teardrops"	Alex Zanetis
