= Love Song of the Waterfall =

"Love Song of the Waterfall" is a song written by Bob Nolan. It was sung by Roy Rogers with the band Sons of the Pioneers, that Bob Nolan was a founding member of.

== Slim Whitman version ==
"Love Song of the Waterfall"

Single by Slim Whitman (The Smilin' Star Duster)

from the album America's Favorite Folk Artist
- A-side: "Love Song of the Waterfall" "My Love Is Growing Stale"
- Released: January 1952
- Genre: Country
- Length: 2:40
- Label: Imperial
- Songwriter: Bob Nolan

Slim Whitman (The Smilin' Star Duster) singles chronology
"I'll Never Pass This Way Again" / "Birmingham Jail" (1949)	"Love Song of the Waterfall" / "My Love Is Growing Stale" (1952)	"Bandera Waltz" / "End of the World" (1952)

Audio
- "Love Song of the Waterfall" on YouTube

This became Slim Whitman's first hit for the Imperial record label in 1952. (Prior to that, he was with RCA Victor.) He recorded it, along with "My Love Is Growing Stale", "Bandera Waltz", and "End of the World", in November 1951 at KWKH.

The first big hit to be recorded at KWKH was by a yodeling tenor balladeer, Slim Whitman, who joined the Hayride in May 1950. Recently signed to Imperial Records, his day job as a postman prevented him from traveling to California for a recording session. Slim turned to Bob Sullivan in seeking a solution to his dilemma. "Sully, can you cut me a record?" The answer was in the affirmative with the proviso that the session could only take place when KWKH was off air. In November 1951 "Love Song of the Waterfall," "My Love Is Growing Stale," "Bandera Waltz," and "End of the World" were recorded one morning. Slim had recorded before (1950) at RCA without success. But from this session the opening song, a Bob Nolan composition, gave him his first Top Ten record in the Billboard country chart (May 1952). Two months later another KWKH recording, "Indian Love Call," went to number two and became a million-seller, heralding Whitman’s arrival as a major recording artist.

— Shreveport Sounds in Black and White

"Love Song of the Waterfall" was released as a single (Imperial 8134, with "My Love Is Growing Stale" on the opposite side) in January 1952 and by the end of April showed up just under the top ten of the Billboard Country & Western Records Most Played by Folk Disk Jockeys chart.

On the record's label, Slim Whitman was subtitled as "The Smilin' Star Duster".

=== Track listing ===
7-inch single (Imperial 45-8134, 1952, United States)
No.	Title	Writer(s)	Length
1.	"Love Song of the Waterfall"	Bob Nolan	2:40
2.	"My Love Is Growing Stale"	Marvin Lacy	2:32

=== Charts ===
Chart (1953)	Peak position
U.S. Billboard Top Country & Western Records	10

== Jimmy Wakely version ==
Professional ratings
Review scores
Source	Rating
Billboard	positive

After Slim Whitman, another rendition of the song was released by Jimmy Wakely with the Les Baxter Orchestra (Capitol 2028, c/w "Goodbye, Little Girl"). "The type of lyric Wakely handles best," wrote Daily Variety.
