= Careless Love =

Traditional song

"Careless Love" is a traditional song, with several popular blues versions. It has been called a "nineteenth-century ballad and Dixieland standard".

The death referenced in an old version was the son of a Kentucky governor. Although published accounts have cited 1926 as the copyright date, W. C. Handy copyrighted "Loveless Love" in 1921 under Pace & Handy Music Co.

A recording by Bessie Smith titled "Careless Love Blues" was very popular in 1925. The same year, it was recorded by Papa Celestin and his Tuxedo Dixieland Jazz Band, and released as a single by OKeh. New Orleans cornetist Chris Kelly was famous for his emotional rendition of the piece.

== See also ==
- List of pre-1920 jazz standards
