= Scott Turner (songwriter) =

Canadian musician (1931–2009)

- John E. Reed, Hollywood

Background information
- Also known as: Scotty Turner
- Born: Graham Morrison Turnbull; August 23, 1931; Sydney, Nova Scotia, Canada
- Died: February 9, 2009 (aged 77) Cobleskill, New York, United States
- Occupations: Composer; record producer; musician; publisher
- Instruments: Keyboards, guitar, trombone, vocals

Scott Turner (born Graham Morrison Turnbull; August 23, 1931 – February 9, 2009) was a Canadian composer, producer, musician, and publisher whose career in the music industry spanned over 50 years, composing songs with Buddy Holly, Audie Murphy, Herb Alpert, John Marascalco and many others.

== Life and career ==
=== Early life ===
Turner was born in Sydney, Nova Scotia, Canada, to Allison and Evelyn (née Peters) Turnbull. At the age of 19, he qualified for the All Canadian Track Team, and would continue to compete for Canada from 1950 to 1956, winning two Canadian long jump championships and representing Canada in the long jump at the 1954 British Empire Games in Vancouver. In 1952, at the age of 21, he moved to the U.S. and enrolled in the University of Dubuque, Iowa. He received a Bachelor of Arts and Science degree from the University of Dubuque in 1955. While recuperating from a serious sporting injury, Turner taught himself to play guitar—a skill that would soon change the course of his life. Though he enrolled in a post graduate program at Texas Tech University, Lubbock in 1956, he would not stay long. In 1956, Turner befriended Buddy Holly, a young Lubbock musician who would soon achieve worldwide success. Like Holly, Turner left his studies to pursue music in 1957. Turner and Holly ultimately wrote thirteen songs together. And, Holly was just the first of many up and coming singers that would be mentored by Turner over the course of his lifetime.

=== Life in music ===
In 1957, Turner wrote his first songs for his good friend Hal Goodson, also from Texas Tech. Goodson recorded two songs at Petty Studios in Clovis, NM – "Who's Gonna Be The Next One Honey" and "Later Baby". These were the first songs that J.I. Allison recorded, several months before recording "Peggy Sue" with Buddy Holly.

From 1957 to 1959, Turner was lead guitarist for Tommy Sands and his band The Raiders (a.k.a. The Sharks, which included pre-Wrecking Crew drummer Hal Blaine). From 1960 to 1961, Turner was lead guitarist and musical director for Guy Mitchell, and served in the same capacities for Eddie Fisher from 1961 to 1963. In 1963, Turner joined A&M Records as a writer/producer.

From there, he went on to be general manager of Central Songs publishing company in Hollywood, and eventually became executive producer of the country division of Liberty/Imperial Records in Hollywood. In 1968, Liberty Records was bought for $38 million by Transamerica Corporation (an insurance company) and combined with their other label United Artists Records. Following that merger, Turner was transferred to Nashville to take over the country division of the newly merged Liberty/Imperial/United Artists.

After leaving the label, he served as an independent producer on several albums for Slim Whitman, garnering Turner four U.K Gold Records, and produced recording sessions for artists such as (in alphabetical order) Bobby Bare, Larry Butler, Jimmy Bryant, Vicki Carr, Johnny Carver, Jimmy Clanton, Roy Clark, Rosemary Clooney, Penny DeHaven, Waylon Jennings, Bobby Lewis, Willie Nelson, Harry Nilsson, Bill Phillips, Del Reeves, Ray Sanders, Mel Tillis, Cliffie Stone, and Jerry Wallace, among others.

Turner also worked in both film and television. He had a number of songs included in movies (see Compositions section below for more details), and his television credits include serving as music director for "Christmas on the General Jackson" (which led to the release in 1988 of a soundtrack album of traditional Christmas songs produced and arranged by Turner and Ron Bledsoe, and performed by Mel Tillis, Kathy Mattea, Lynn Anderson, Butch Baker, Donna Fargo, and David Lynn Jones, among others), and to making appearances on The Perry Como Show, The Milton Berle Show, The Mike Douglas Show, Entertainment Tonight and A Current Affair.

=== Compositions ===
Turner ultimately wrote over 400 songs, many of which were co-written with artists such as (in alphabetical order) Herb Alpert, Mac Davis, Buddy Holly (13 songs in total, during writing sessions in Lubbock in 1957 and in New York in 1958), Mac Davis, Diane Lampert, Alex Harvey, Red Lane, John Marascalco, Guy Mitchell, Audie Murphy (83 songs in total), Harry Nilsson while at A&M, Johnny O'Keefe, Doc Pomus, Tommy Sands, and Charlie Williams.

Turner's songs have been recorded by (in alphabetical order) Kay Adams, Herb Alpert & the Tijuana Brass, Eddy Arnold, The Baja Marimba Band, James Burton, Larry Butler, Jimmy Bryant, Roy Clark, Jimmy Dean, Penny DeHaven, The Del-Vikings, Dave Dudley, Tennessee Ernie Ford, Robert Gordon, Bonnie Guitar, Wanda Jackson, Dean Martin, Skeets McDonald, Nilsson, Charley Pride, Del Reeves, Jean Shepard, Wynn Stewart, Sonny Throckmorton, Gene Vincent, Porter Wagoner, Jerry Wallace, Slim Whitman, and Tammy Wynette.

Turner provided background tracks for a number of films, and three of Turner's songs were featured in the television movie Shout! The Story of Johnny O'Keefe. Herb Alpert's 1964 recording of Turner's song "Mexican Drummer Man" was used in the 1966 Teri Garr short Where's the Bus, "One More River to Cross" (co-written with Freddie Scott) can be heard in the Christopher Walken film The Opportunists, and "Little Pink Mack" (co-written with Chris Darrell Roberts and Jim Thornton) was used in the film Truckers.

=== Music publishing firms ===
Publishing companies founded by Turner are Buried Treasure Music (ASCAP), Captain Kidd Music (BMI), and Captain Kidd, LLC.

== Memorabilia ==
Turner's memorabilia is now housed at the Willie Nelson and Friends General Store & Museum, Nashville, Tennessee.

=== Biography ===
As of June 2012, Australian biographer Damian Johnstone (author of "The Wild One: The Life and Times of Johnny O'Keefe" and "A Race to Remember: The Peter Norman Story") was writing a biography of Scott Turner with the working title "Shutters and Boards – The Scott Turner Story," which is tentatively planned for publication in 2013.
