= Slim Whitman =

American country musician (1923–2013)

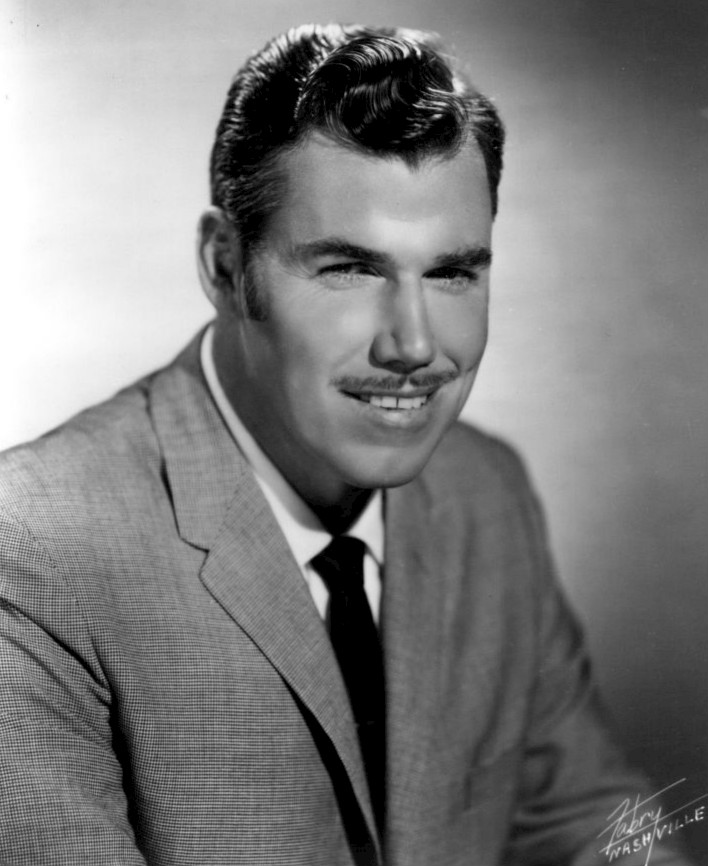
- Whitman in 1968
- Born: Ottis Dewey Whitman Jr. January 20, 1923; Oak Park, Tampa, Florida, U.S.
- Died: June 19, 2013 (aged 90); Orange Park, Florida, U.S.
- Other names: O. D. Whitman; The Smilin' Starduster
- Occupations: Musician; singer; songwriter
- Years active: 1945–2003 (Touring); 1948–1983, 2002 (Recording)
- Spouse: Alma Geraldine ”Jerry" Crist (m. 1941; died 2009)
- Children: 2
- Musical career
- Genres: Country and western music; folk music; gospel; pop
- Instruments: Guitar, vocals
- Labels: RCA Victor; Imperial; London; United Artists; Epic; Suffolk; Rangehood

Ottis Dewey "Slim" Whitman Jr. (January 20, 1923 – June 19, 2013) was an American country music singer and guitarist known for his yodeling abilities and his use of falsetto. Recorded figures show 70 million sales, during a career that spanned more than seven decades. His prolific output included more than 100 albums and around 500 recorded songs; these consisted of country music, contemporary gospel, Broadway show tunes, love songs, and standards. Soon after being signed, in the 1950s Whitman toured with Elvis Presley.

== Biography ==
Ottis Dewey Whitman Jr. was born in the Oak Park neighborhood of Tampa, Florida on January 20, 1923. He was one of six children, born to Ottis Dewey Whitman (1896–1961) and Lucy Whitman (née Mahon; 1903–1987).

Growing up, he liked the country music of Jimmie Rodgers and the songs of Gene Autry. He often sang along with records, but Whitman's early ambitions were to become either a boxer or a professional baseball player.

He served during World War II in the South Pacific with the United States Navy. While aboard ship, he sang and entertained members on board. Liking his contributions, the captain blocked his transfer to another ship. Whitman's life was saved, as the other ship later sank with all hands lost.

== Career ==
=== Early career ===
Whitman was a self-taught left-handed guitarist, although he was right-handed. He had lost almost all of the second finger on his left hand in an accident while working at a meat packing plant.

He had returned to Tampa after the war, where he worked odd jobs at a shipyard while developing a musical career. Eventually he performed with bands such as the Variety Rhythm Boys and the Light Crust Doughboys. He was briefly nicknamed The Smiling Starduster after a stint with a group called The Stardusters.

Whitman's first big break came when talent manager "Colonel" Tom Parker heard him singing on the radio and offered to represent him. After signing with RCA Records, he was billed as "the cowboy singer Slim Whitman", after Canadian singer Wilf Carter, who was known in the United States as Montana Slim. Whitman released his first single in 1948, "I'm Casting My Lasso Towards the Sky", complete with yodel. He toured and sang in a variety of venues, including the radio show Louisiana Hayride.

Initially unable to make a living from music, he kept a part-time job at a post office. That changed in the early 1950s after he recorded a version of the Bob Nolan hit "Love Song of the Waterfall", which made it into the country music top 10. His next single, "Indian Love Call", taken from the light operetta Rose-Marie, was even more successful, reaching number two in the country music chart and appearing in the US pop music chart's top ten. It sold over one million copies.

=== Hit recordings ===
A yodeller, Whitman avoided country music's "down on yer luck, buried in booze" songs, preferring instead to sing laid-back romantic melodies about simple life and love. Critics dubbed his style "countrypolitan", owing to its fusion of country music and a more sophisticated crooning vocal style. Although he recorded many country and western tunes, including hits "Tumbling Tumbleweeds", "Singing Hills", and "The Cattle Call", love and romance songs like "Serenade", "Something Beautiful (to Remember)", and "Keep It a Secret" figured prominently in his repertoire.

In 1955, he had a No. 1 hit on the UK Singles Chart with the theme song to the operetta Rose-Marie. With 19 weeks in the chart and eleven weeks at the top of it, the song set a record that lasted for 36 years. (Bryan Adams broke the record in 1991 with "(Everything I Do) I Do It for You".)

In 1956 he became the first-ever country music singer to perform at the London Palladium. Soon after, Whitman was invited to join the Grand Ole Opry, and in 1957, along with other musical stars, he appeared in the film musical Jamboree. Despite this exposure, he never achieved the level of stardom in the United States that he did in Britain, where he had a number of other hits during the 1950s.

Throughout the early 1970s, he continued to record and was a guest on Wolfman Jack's television show The Midnight Special. At the time, Whitman's recording efforts were yielding only minor hits in the US.

But the mid-1970s were a successful time for Whitman in the UK Albums Chart. In 1976, the compilation album The Very Best of Slim Whitman was number one for six weeks, staying 17 weeks on the chart. Another number one album followed in 1977 with Red River Valley: four weeks at number one and 14 weeks on the chart. Later the same year, his album Home on the Range made number 2 on the chart and accumulated a chart stay of 13 weeks. He released "Ghost Riders in the Sky" album in 1978.

In 1979, Whitman produced a TV commercial to support Suffolk Marketing's release of a greatest hits compilation titled All My Best. Just for You, also under the Suffolk umbrella, followed in 1980, with a commercial that said Whitman "was number one in England longer than Elvis and The Beatles." The Best followed in 1982, with Whitman concluding his TV marketing with Best Loved Favorites in 1989 and 20 Precious Memories in 1991. Twilight on the Trail, his final release, appeared in 2010, 55 years after his first.

In 1982, Whitman's 20 Golden Greats was certified platinum in Australia.

=== TV marketing ===
The TV albums briefly made Whitman a household name in the United States for the first time in his career, resulting in everything from a first-time appearance on The Tonight Show Starring Johnny Carson to Whitman being parodied in a comic skit on Second City Television (SCTV); he was played by Joe Flaherty, as supposedly starring in the Che Guevara-like male lead in a Broadway musical on the life of Indira Gandhi. More importantly, the TV albums gave Whitman a brief resurgence in mainstream country music; he gained new album releases on major labels and a few new singles on the country charts. During this time, he toured Europe and Australia with moderate success.

=== Popularity in Europe ===
Although once known as "America's Favorite Folk Singer", Whitman was consistently more popular throughout Europe, and in particular the United Kingdom, especially with his covers of pop standards, film songs, love songs, folk tunes, and gospel hymns.

In the U.S., his "Indian Love Call" (1952) and a reworking of the Doris Day hit, "Secret Love" (1953), both reached No. 2 on the Billboard country chart.

From the mid-1960s and into the 1970s, Whitman had a string of top 10 hits. Through television marketing in the 1980s, he became known to new generations of fans. Throughout the 1990s and into the 21st century, he continued to tour extensively around the world. After several years without recording in a studio, he released his final album, Twilight on the Trail (2010).

=== Later recordings ===
Angeline, Whitman's last album under contract, was released in 1984, after which he continued to tour.

In 1988 or 1990, EMI Australia released his joint album with his son Byron Whitman, titled Magic Moments. In 1998, he released another album with Byron, Traditional Country: The Legendary Slim Whitman with Son Byron Whitman.

In November 1991, after Bryan Adams' single "(Everything I Do) I Do It for You" broke the 36-year UK sales record held by Whitman's version of "Rose Marie", Whitman joined Adams on stage at Wembley Arena and sang "Rose Marie" before presenting Adams with a plaque commemorating the achievement.

Whitman's last performance in the UK was at Norwich in October 2002, and in the U.S. in September or October 2003, as he effectively retired from the music business to care for his ailing wife Jerry, returning to the stage only occasionally with one-week series of concerts in Las Vegas. His wife Jerry died in 2009.

In 2010, after eight years in production, Whitman released the album Twilight on the Trail. He was 87 years old. The album featured western standards such as Gene Autry's hit "Back in the Saddle Again" and the television theme song for The Roy Rogers and Dale Evans Show. Twilight on the Trail was produced by his son Byron Whitman and featured many well-known session musicians, including long-time band member Harold Bradley.

== Personal life ==
Whitman was married to Alma Geraldine "Jerry" Crist (August 9, 1924 – February 16, 2009) on June 28, 1941, until her death in 2009. She was born in Kansas, the daughter of church minister, A.D. Crist, and his wife. The couple had two children, a daughter (Sharron, born 1942, who later married Roy Beagle), and a son (Byron Keith Whitman, born 1957).

Byron followed his father into music as a performer and producer. He released a number of recordings with his father, and also toured with him on numerous occasions.

From 1957 until his death, Whitman lived with his family at his estate, Woodpecker Paradise, in Middleburg, Florida.

He was a longtime active member and deacon at Jacksonville Church of the Brethren. A biography, Mr. Songman: The Slim Whitman Story, was written by Kenneth L. Gibble and published in 1982 by Brethren Press.

== Mistaken obituary and later death ==
On January 20, 2008, on what was, coincidentally, Whitman's 85th birthday, a premature obituary was published by the Nashville Tennessean newspaper. It was later picked up virally on the newspaper's website. It was believed to have been based on an erroneous report.

Slim Whitman died of heart failure on June 19, 2013, at the age of 90, at Orange Park Medical Center in Orange Park, Florida. He is buried in the Middleburg United Methodist Church Cemetery in Middleburg, Florida, next to his wife.

== Legacy ==
For his contribution to the recording industry, Whitman was celebrated by a star on the Hollywood Walk of Fame at 1709 Vine Street.

George Harrison of the Beatles cited Whitman as an early influence: "The first person I ever saw playing a guitar was Slim Whitman, either a photo of him in a magazine or live on television. Guitars were definitely coming in." When a young Paul McCartney purchased his first guitar, the left-handed musician was unsure how to play an instrument that was manufactured and strung for a right-handed player. It was not until McCartney saw a picture of Whitman playing left-handed that he re-strung his guitar so that he too could play left-handed. American pop singer Michael Jackson cited Whitman as one of his ten favorite vocalists.

The 1996 film Mars Attacks! features Whitman's rendition of "Indian Love Call" as a weapon against Martian invaders (the song causes the Martians' heads to explode).

In 2003, Rob Zombie used Whitman's version of "I Remember You" in his directorial debut in the film House of 1000 Corpses.

Daniel Johnston mentioned Whitman in his song "Wild West Virginia" on his 1981 album Songs of Pain.

== Discography ==
Studio albums

- Slim Whitman Sings and Yodels (1954)
- America's Favorite Folk Artist (1954)
- Slim Whitman Favorites (1956)
  a.k.a. Country Hits, Volume 2
- Slim Whitman Sings (1957)
  a.k.a. Country Hits, Volume 1
- Slim Whitman Sings (1958)
  a.k.a. My Best to You
- Slim Whitman Sings (1959)
  a.k.a. Country Favorites
- I'll Walk with God (1959)
- Slim Whitman Sings Million Record Hits (1960)
  a.k.a. The Song of the Old Waterwheel
- Slim Whitman (1960)
  a.k.a. Slim Whitman's First Visit to Britain
  and I'll Never Stop Loving You
- Just Call Me Lonesome (1961)
  a.k.a. Portrait
- Once in a Lifetime (1961)
  a.k.a. Cool Water
- Slim Whitman Sings Annie Laurie (1961)
  a.k.a. Sweeter than the Flowers
- Forever (1962)
- Slim Whitman Sings (1962)
  a.k.a. Anytime
- Heart Songs & Love Songs (1962)
- I'm a Lonely Wanderer (1963)
- Yodeling (1963)
- Irish Songs the Slim Whitman Way (1963)
- All-Time Favorites (1964)
- Country Songs / City Hits (1964)
- Love Song of the Waterfall (1965)
- Reminiscing (1965)
- More than Yesterday
  (More Country Songs & City Hits) (1965)
- God's Hand in Mine (1966)
- A Travelin' Man (1966)
- A Time for Love (1966)
- 15th Anniversary Album (1967)
- Country Memories (1967)
- In Love the Whitman Way (1968)
- Happy Street (1968)
- Slim! (1969)
  a.k.a.Straight from the Heart
- The Slim Whitman Christmas Album (1969)
- Tomorrow Never Comes (1970)
- Guess Who (1971)
  a.k.a. Snowbird
- It's a Sin to Tell a Lie (1971)
- The Best of Slim Whitman (1972)
- I'll See You When (1973)
- Happy Anniversary (1974)
- Everything Leads Back to You (1975)
- Red River Valley (1976)
- Home on the Range (1977)
- Ghost Riders in the Sky (1978)
- Till We Meet Again (1980)
- Songs I Love to Sing (1980)
- Christmas with Slim Whitman (1980)
- Mr. Songman (1981)
- I'll Be Home for Christmas (1981)
- Angeline (1984)
- Magic Moments (with Byron Whitman) (1988)
- Traditional Country (with Byron Whitman) (1998)
- Twilight on the Trail (2010)
