= Slim Whitman Sings Million Record Hits =

Studio album by Slim Whitman
- Released: 1960
- Genre: Country
- Label: Imperial

Slim Whitman chronology
I'll Walk with God (1959)	Slim Whitman Sings Million Record Hits (1960)	Slim Whitman's First Visit to Britain (1960)

Professional ratings
Review scores
Source	Rating
AllMusic	3.5/5 stars
Billboard	4/4 stars

Slim Whitman Sings Million Record Hits is a studio album by Slim Whitman, released in 1960 on Imperial Records.

On this album, Whitman sings some of his biggest hits, which include "Rose Marie," "Indian Love Call," and "China Doll".

== Release history ==
The album was issued in the United States by Imperial Records as a 12-inch long-playing record, catalog numbers LP 9102 (mono) and LP 12102 (stereo).

In 1966, it was reissued in the United States under the title The Song of the Old Waterwheel.

There are also a 4-track-cartridge version (cat. nr. Imperial LP 9102) and a 8-track-cartridge version (cat. nr. Liberty 750), both titled Million Sellers.

== Track listing ==
Side one
No.	Title	Writer(s)	Length
1.	"Indian Love Call"		2:30
2.	"China Doll"		2:32
3.	"Secret Love"	Paul Francis Webster; Sammy Fain	2:30
4.	"An Amateur in Love"		2:05
5.	"Keep It a Secret"	Jessie Mae Robinson	2:45
6.	"The Song of the Old Waterwheel"		3:00

Side two
No.	Title	Writer(s)	Length
1.	"Rose Marie"		2:20
2.	"Haunted Hungry Heart"		2:28
3.	"Cattle Call"	Tex Owens	2:20
4.	"By the Waters of the Minnetonka"		2:45
5.	"When I Grow Too Old to Dream"	Oscar Hammerstein II; Sigmund Romberg	2:25
6.	"I Talk to the Waves"		2:45
