= Rose Mary =

Rose Mary may refer to:

- USS Rose Mary (SP-1216), a United States Navy patrol vessel

== See also ==
- Rosemary (disambiguation)
- Rose Marie (disambiguation)
