= Because I Can (Katy Rose album) =

2004 studio album by Katy Rose

Studio album by Katy Rose
- Released: January 27, 2004
- Genre: Pop rock
- Length: 41:02
- Label: V2
- Producer: Kim Bullard

Katy Rose chronology
Because I Can (2004)	Candy Eyed (2007)

Singles from Because I Can
- 1. "Overdrive" Released: July 28, 2003; 2. "I Like" Released: 2004

Because I Can is the debut studio album by American singer-songwriter Katy Rose. V2 Records released the album on January 27, 2004. Rose co-wrote Because I Can with her father, Kim Bullard, who also produced the album. Rose additionally worked with songwriters including Stuart Mathis, Holly Mathis, River Jones, Billy Mohler, and Danny Dunlap. Because I Can's lyrical themes revolve around depression, rebellion, and innocence.

The album was supported by two singles, "Overdrive" and "I Like". The former, being the lead single from the record, became Rose's most chart successful single to date, peaking at 37 on the US Adult Top 40 chart. The song was also featured in the 2004 film and movie soundtrack of Mean Girls. Furthermore, despite not being released as a single, the album track "Lemon" would be featured in the 2003 film and movie soundtrack of Thirteen.

On August 20, 2015, Rose announced in a Twitter post that she plans to remaster and reissue the album with the inclusion of an additional song.

== Background ==
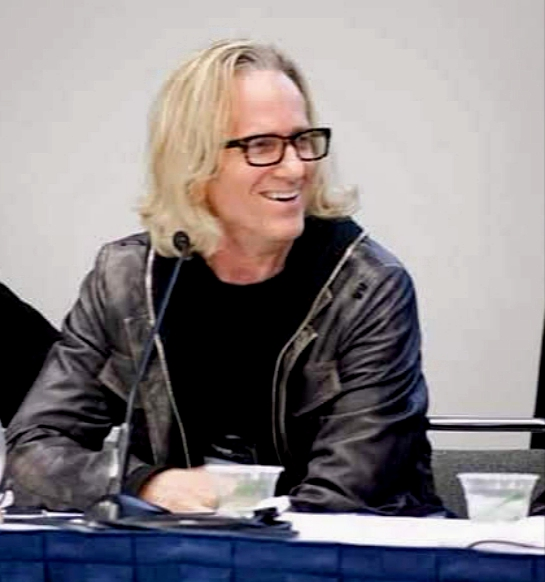
Rose and her father, Kim Bullard, wrote and produced the entirety of Because I Can in collaboration.

As a teenager, Rose performed in an all-female punk rock band named Ruby Red Slipper, that predominately performed covers of popular rock songs. Some of these songs include covers of those performed by Hole and Weezer. However, the group also wrote and performed a few original songs, which Rose credits as having been a "good songwriting lesson" in preparation for the writing process of her debut record. One of the songs written by Rose while in the group was "License to Thrill," which was released as a B-side to the record's second single, "I Like," in addition to being featured on the original soundtrack for Going the Distance.

Rose began seriously composing songs in 2001 as a creative outlet for herself, with the songs grabbing the attention of several music executives. One of these songs, titled "Mermaid Jane," ultimately secured Rose a record deal at V2 Records. After being signed, Rose spent the next three years composing her debut effort in collaboration with her father, pianist and songwriter Kim Bullard, who would ultimately produce the entire album. Rose states that the recording sessions with her father went smoothly, outside of a few lyrics which caused "serious consternation" between them. The first song written for the album was the title track, "Because I Can," which Rose wrote when she was twelve years old. The album focuses on themes of depression, rebellion, innocence and Rose's coming of age. In an interview with Entertainment Weekly, Rose asserted that she strived to be as honest as possible in her songs and that the album acted as a "way of asking for help without [actually] asking for help".

When speaking to Today, Rose vented her frustration with the success of Avril Lavigne's 2002 effort Let Go, as she felt that she would be compared to Lavigne upon the release of Because I Can. Rose stated that "it made me angry at first when Avril came out. I'm not like a competitive person, but suddenly I was starting to be called another Avril ... it just kind of made me angry that she didn't have to go through the [stuff] that I did to make it".

== Promotion and release ==
In 2003, Rose would release a promotional recording titled Sampler, which featured the songs "Overdrive", "Vacation", "Catch My Fall" and "I Like". In the United States, pressings of the recording also featured the song "Teachin' Myself to Dream".

Prior to the release of the record, Rose embarked on a slew of promotional interviews and performances, including with publications and programs such as Blender, The New York Times, and Total Request Live. Rose also had several songs featured on soundtracks in the lead up to the album. In 2003, the song "Lemon" was featured on the soundtrack to the film Thirteen, while "Teachin' Myself to Dream" was featured on the soundtrack to the film Agent Cody Banks. The following year in 2004, the outtake "License to Thrill" and lead single "Overdrive" were featured on the soundtracks to the films Going the Distance and Mean Girls, respectively.

"Overdrive", the first single from the album, was produced by Kim Bullard and was released on October 21, 2003. The song would go on to chart on the US Adult Top 40 for six weeks, peaking at number 37. The single would also peak at 8 on the New Zealand RIANZ single chart. The physical release of the single included the b-side "Lemon". Furthermore, the single would be featured in the film Mean Girls in addition to the film's respective soundtrack. The second and final single from the album was "I Like". The single failed to have any chart impact globally. The physical release of the single included two b-sides, being "License to Thrill" and a cover of The Rolling Stones' "As Tears Go By".

== Touring ==
In an effort to support Because I Can, Rose embarked on the Chicks with Attitude Tour in 2004. The tour had 19 North American tour dates, launching on August 4 in Chicago and concluding on September 3 in Washington D.C. Maybelline sponsored the tour, in which the company promoted their relaunch through having the Maybelline logo appear on signage and offering makeovers at tour venues. When asked about the Maybelline sponsorship, Rose stated that she is grateful for the support as "some people tour without [a marketing vehicle], but that means less ads and less money". Throughout the course of the tour, Rose performed alongside other acts such as Liz Phair, The Cardigans lead singer Nina Persson, and Charlotte Martin.

The promotion of "I Like," the second single from Because I Can, was a focal point for Rose on the tour. The song was often used as the opening song for Rose's setlist, with Rose declaring that the track is "a very powerful song". However, despite this promotion, the song failed to gain traction.

== Reception ==
Professional ratings
Review scores
Source	Rating
AllMusic	3/5 stars
Blender	4/5 stars
Entertainment Weekly	B−
Slant Magazine	3/5 stars
USA Today	2/4 stars

Because I Can garnered mixed reviews from music critics. Aaron Latham of AllMusic gave the album 3 out of 5 stars, stating that the album "delivers a set of pop/rockers that are lyrically convincing, musically sound, and a step above most anything by Avril Lavigne, someone she will inevitably be compared to in age and attitude". Sal Cinquemani of Slant Magazine also gave the album 3 out of 5 stars, calling it "overproduced," describing the effort as "effectively [bottling] female teen angst into tidy four-and-a-half minute blocks". Susanne Ault of Billboard magazine asserted that the record often "meanders into bland pop territory," but praised Rose's "enviable pipes" on the album. Jim Farber of Entertainment Weekly criticized the record's production and vocals, stating "if only the neo-new-wave production and Rose's conversational vocals had as much sass [as her lyrics]". Blender praised the effort, asserting that Rose's music is "as catchy as can be, if not a little catchier [than her Top 40 contemporaries]. But unlike them, she’s indisputably the real deal".

Rose responded to the mixed criticism of Because I Can in a written journal entry on her website. Rose urged music critics and listeners to focus on "my words... lyrics... poetry...etc...," as opposed to solely focusing on her public image. She also wrote about how she was cognizant that she would receive this type of criticism, maintaining that "the more successful one gets, the more anxious people are to knock them down".

== Track listing ==
Because I Can – Standard edition
No.	Title	Writer(s)	Length
1.	"Overdrive"	Katy Rose; Kim Bullard	2:52
2.	"I Like"	Rose; Bullard; Stuart Mathis	3:31
3.	"Watching the Rain"	Rose; Bullard	2:35
4.	"Enchanted"	Rose; Bullard	3:36
5.	"Catch My Fall"	Rose; Bullard	3:19
6.	"Snowflakes"	Rose; Bullard	3:54
7.	"Glow"	Rose; Bullard	3:23
8.	"Teachin' Myself to Dream"	Rose; Bullard; S. Mathis; Holly Mathis	3:10
9.	"Vacation"	Rose; Bullard; River Jones	2:21
10.	"Original Skin"	Rose; Bullard	4:17
11.	"Lemon"	Rose; Bullard	4:40
12.	"Because I Can"	Rose; Bullard	3:15
Total length:			40:53

Because I Can – European edition (bonus track)
No.	Title	Writer(s)	Length
2.	"Keeping It Together"	Rose; Billy Mohler; Danny Dunlap	3:23
Total length:			44:16

Because I Can – Japanese edition (bonus track)
No.	Title	Writer(s)	Length
13.	"Lullabye"	Jones	5:03
Total length:			45:56

== Personnel ==
Credits adapted from Barnes and Noble.

- Katy Rose – vocals, backing vocals (1–3, 5, 8, 11), electric piano (6), string arrangements (11), guitars (12)
- Kim Bullard – keyboards, programming, arrangements, guitars (3, 5, 8), string arrangements (10)
- Stuart Mathis – guitars (1)
- Tim Pierce – guitars (1–8, 10–12), additional arrangements (10)
- Michael Ward – guitars (1, 2, 4)
- Eli Wulfmeier – guitars (6)
- Chris Lee – guitars (7)
- Bruce Watson – guitars (8, 9)
- Bryce Martin – guitars (9)
- Kim Carroll – guitars (12)
- Danny Dunlap – bass (1–11)
- Tony Franklin – bass (12)
- Ramy Antoun – drums (1–5, 7, 8, 10, 11), architecture (1)
- River Jones – drums (1, 6, 9, 12), backing vocals (5), additional programming (7)
- Jason DeMonte – turntables (1)
- Kate Hyman – additional arrangements (2)
- Bennett Salvay – string arrangements (10)
- Billy Trudell – backing vocals (1, 2, 5)
- Jennifer Paige – backing vocals (credited as JP) (2, 5, 8)
- Daisy Tosca – backing vocals (3), string arrangements (11)
- P. Razzi – backing vocals (4)
- Timothy B. Schmit – backing vocals (12)

== Production ==
- Kate Hyman – A&R
- Kim Bullard – producer, engineer, mixing (6, 7, 9, 10, 12)
- Chris Lord-Alge – mixing (1–3)
- Randy Staub – mixing (4, 5, 8)
- Bob Clearmountain – mixing (11)
- Tim Bryson – assistant engineer
- Zach Blackstone – mix assistant (4, 5, 8)
- George Marino – mastering at Sterling Sound (New York City, New York)
- Rehab (NYC) – design
- Tom Betterton – photography
- Jenny Gage – photography
- Nettwerk Management – management

== Charts ==
Chart (2004)	Peak position
French Albums (SNEP)	100
Japanese Albums (Oricon)	40
US Top Heatseekers (Billboard)	34
