= Marie Rose =

Marie Rose may refer to:

== People ==
- Marie Marguerite Rose (1717–1757), Guinea-born Canadian slave
- Marie Rose Abousefian, Armenian actress and writer
- Marie Rose (Delorme) Smith (1861-1960), Métis rancher, homesteader, medicine woman, midwife, and author.
- Marie-Rose Armesto (1960–2007), Spanish-born Belgian journalist
- Marie-Rose Astié de Valsayre (1846–1939), French violinist, feminist, nurse and writer
- Marie Rose Cavelan (1752 - fl. 1795), French-Afro-Grenadian planter and revolutionary
- Marie-Rose Carême, French professional football manager
- Marie-Rose Léodille Delaunay (1827–1906), a Haitian educator
- Marie Rose Durocher (1811–1849), Canadian Roman Catholic nun who founded the Sisters of the Holy Names of Jesus and Mary
- Marie Rose Ferron (1902–1936), often called the Little Rose, Canadian-American Roman Catholic mystic
- Marie-Rose Gaillard (1944–2022), former Belgian racing cyclist
- Marie Rose Guiraud (1944–2020), Ivorian dancer and choreographer
- Marie-Rose Morel (1972–2011), Flemish-Belgian politician
- Marie Rose Mureshyankwano (born 1968), Rwandan politician
- Marie-Rose Nizigiyimana (born 1966), Burundian politician
- Marie-Rose Tessier (1910–2026), French supercentenarian
- Marie-Rose Turcot (1887–1977), Canadian writer

== Other uses ==
- Marie Rose (Dead or Alive), a character from the video game Dead or Alive
- Marie Rose sauce, a British condiment

== See also ==
- Marie Roze (1846–1926), French operatic soprano
- Rose Marie (disambiguation)
- Mary Rose (disambiguation)
