= Shoot for the Moon =

Shoot for the Moon may refer to:

- Shoot for the Moon (song), by Poco, 1982
- Shoot for the Moon (album), by Linda Davis, 1994

== See also ==
- Shoot for the Stars, Aim for the Moon, a 2020 studio album by Pop Smoke
