= Call It Love =

Call It Love may refer to:

== Music ==
- Call It Love (album), by Briana Marela, or the title song, 2017
- "Call It Love" (Deuce song), 1995
- "Call It Love" (Poco song), 1989
- "Call It Love", a song by Chungha from Flourishing, 2019
- "Call It Love", a song by Felix Jaehn, 2022
- "Call It Love", a song by Nilüfer Yanya from My Method Actor, 2024
- "Call It Love", a song by Stefano Langone, 2019
- "Call It Love", a song by Yello from One Second, 1987

== Other uses ==
- Call It Love (TV series), a 2023 South Korean streaming series
- Call It Love?, a 1960 play by Robert Tanitch
