= Mary Rose (disambiguation) =

Mary Rose is a 16th century English ship, sunk, recovered and preserved in Portsmouth

Mary Rose or variations may also refer to:

- HMS Mary Rose, ships of the Royal Navy named "Mary Rose"
- Mary Rose Trust, Portsmouth, England, UK; a limited trust for the preservation of the 16th-century Mary Rose carrack
- Mary Rose Museum, Portsmouth, England, UK; the museum housing the 16th-century Mary Rose carrack

== People ==
=== Given name "Mary" surname "Rose" ===
- Mary Swartz Rose (1874–1941) U.S. scientist, nutritionist, dietician
- Mary Rose (hurdler), U.S. champion in the 50 yards hurdles at the 1964 USA Indoor Track and Field Championships

=== Given name "Mary Rose", "Maryrose" ===
- Mary Rose Columba Adams (1832—1891), British catholic prioress
- Mary Rose Alpers (1906–2002; née Coulton), British novelist
- Mary Rose-Anne Bolduc, birth name of La Bolduc (1894–1941), Canadian musician and singer
- Mary Rose Barrington (1926–2020), British parapsychologist and barrister
- Mary Rose Hill Burton (1859–1900), British artist
- Mary Rose Byrne (born 1979), Australian actress
- Mary Rose Callaghan (born 1944), Irish novelist
- Maryrose Crook (née Wilkinson), New Zealand musician
- Mary Rose Gearty, Irish judge
- Mary Rose Gliksten, British politician
- Mary Rose Helen Giedroyc, birth name of Coky Giedroyc (born 1963), English director
- Mary-Rose MacColl (born 1961), Australian novelist
- Mary Rose McGeady (1928–2012), U.S. catholic sister
- Mary Rose McGee (1917–2004), U.S. politician
- Mary Rose O'Reilley, U.S. poet
- Mary Rose Oakar (1940–2025), U.S. politician
- Maryrose Reeves Allen (1899–1992), U.S. physical educator
- Mary Rose Thacker (1922–1983), Canadian figure skater
- Mary Rose-Anna Travers (1894–1941), French-Canadian singer
- Mary Rose Tuitt (1930–2005), Montserrat politician
- Mary Rose Tully (1946–2010), U.S. lactation consultant
- Mary Rose Wilcox, American politician
- Mary Rose Young (born 1958), British ceramics artist
- Priscilla Mary Rose Curzon (born 1940), daughter of Edward Curzon, 6th Earl Howe
- Eimear Mary Rose Quinn (born 1972), Irish singer

=== Fictional characters ===
- Mary Rose, the titular character of the J.M. Barrie play Mary Rose (play)

== Other uses ==
- Mary Rose (play), a play by J.M. Barrie

== See also ==
- Marie Rose (disambiguation)
- Rosemary (disambiguation)
- Mary (disambiguation)
- Rose (disambiguation)
