= Overdrive (Katy Rose song) =

Single by Katy Rose

from the album Because I Can
- B-side: "Lemon"
- Released: July 28, 2003
- Recorded: 2003
- Genre: Alternative rock; power pop
- Length: 2:53
- Label: V2
- Songwriter(s): Katy Rose; Kim Bullard
- Producer(s): Kim Bullard

Katy Rose singles chronology
"Overdrive" (2003)	"I Like" (2004)

"Overdrive" is a song by American singer-songwriter Katy Rose from her debut studio album, Because I Can (2004). Rose wrote the song with her father Kim Bullard, who also served as its producer. V2 Records released it as the album's lead single on July 28, 2003. A pop rock song, it was inspired by Rose's feelings of angst and self-discovery as a teenager. "Overdrive" was featured on the soundtrack to the teen comedy film Mean Girls (2004).

== Writing and inspiration ==
"Overdrive" was written by Rose, at the age of fourteen in collaboration with her father, Kim Bullard. The New York Times described the song as a "paean to the beauty and beastliness of growing up too fast in Southern California." In an interview with Affinity, Rose stated that the song acted as a "cathartic little capsule for the angst and self-discovery I was blasting off into as a teenager in LA".

== Critical reception ==
Aaron Latham of AllMusic criticized the song, stating that "it is unfortunate that the production style [of the album] is so hooked into the angry teen girl sound of the moment that it makes an interesting song like the single 'Overdrive' sound banal". Sal Cinquemani of Slant Magazine described the song as "catchy," stating that it is "a trite condemnation of Californication".

== Music video ==
The music video was directed by Sophie Muller in California.

== Use in media ==
The song was used in the films Thirteen and Mean Girls. It was also used in the TV series Laguna Beach: The Real Orange County, One Tree Hill and Joan of Arcadia.

== Track listings and formats ==
- European and United States CD single
1. "Overdrive" – 2:53
2. "Lemon" – 4:42
- Australian CD single
1. "Overdrive" – 2:52
2. "Lemon" – 4:40
3. "Overdrive" (Video) – 3:07
4. "EPK" – 4:54
- Digital download
1. "Overdrive" (So Wylie Remix) – 2:21
2. "Overdrive" (2021 Version) – 3:08
3. "Overdrive" (Stripped) – 3:17
4. "Overdrive" (Original Demo) – 2:03

== Charts ==
Chart (2003–04)	Peak position
Australia (ARIA)	94
Netherlands (Dutch Top 40 Tipparade)	17
Netherlands (Single Top 100)	80
New Zealand (Recorded Music NZ)	8
US Adult Pop Airplay (Billboard)	37
US Hot Digital Tracks (Billboard)	40

== Release history ==
Region	Date	Formats(s)	Label(s)	Ref(s).
United States	July 28, 2003	Hot AC; alternative radio	V2	
United States	October 7, 2003	CD	V2	
Australia	November 10, 2003	CD	Festival	
United States	January 26, 2004	Contemporary hit radio	V2	
