= Armesto =

Armesto is a surname of Spanish origin. People with that name include:

- Marie-Rose Armesto (1960–2007), Spanish-born Belgian journalist
- Sebastian Armesto (born 1982), British actor

== See also ==
- Felipe Fernández-Armesto (born 1950), British historian
