= Rosemary (disambiguation) =

Rosemary is the common name for the herb Salvia rosmarinus.

Rosemary may also refer to:

== Music ==
- "Rosemary", a song by Gomez from their 2000 compilation album Abandoned Shopping Trolley Hotline
- "Rosemary", a 1961 song composed by Frank Loesser
- "Rosemary", a song from the 1969 Grateful Dead album Aoxomoxoa
- "Rosemary", a brief romantic piano work by Frank Bridge
- "Rosemary", a song from Katy Rose's 2007 album Candy Eyed
- "Rosemary", a song from Lenny Kravitz's 1989 album Let Love Rule
- "Rosemary", a song from Jay Chou's 2006 album Still Fantasy
- "Rosemary", a song from Deftones' 2012 album Koi No Yokan
- "Rosemary", a song from the musical How to Succeed in Business Without Really Trying
  - appears on 2011 revival cast recording
- "Rose Marie", Slim Whitman's song
- "Rosemarie", a 1935 German love song composed by Herms Niel
- "Rosemary", a song from Sierra Ferrell's 2024 album Trail of Flowers

== Places ==
- Rosemary, Alberta, Canada
- Rosemary Rock, Three Kings Islands, New Zealand
- Rosemary Island, Western Australia

== Given name ==
- Rosemary (given name), the given name
- Rosemary (Metal Gear), a video game character from the Metal Gear Solid series
- "Rosemary," stage name of Hong Kong-French singer Rosemary Vandenbroucke
- Rose Marie, an actress who portrayed Sally Rogers on The Dick Van Dyke Show
- Rosemary (wrestler), professional wrestler
- Rosemary (poet), Malayalam language poet and translator

== Other ==
- Florida, sandhill, or scrub rosemary, a scrub plant of the southeastern United States
- Rosemary (radio series), a radio daytime soap opera broadcast on NBC from 1944 to 1945 and on CBS from 1945 to 1955
- Rosemary & Thyme, a British television series that starred Felicity Kendal and Pam Ferris as gardening detectives Rosemary Boxer and Laura Thyme
- Rosemary (1938 film), a Hungarian romantic comedy film
- Rosemary (1958 film), a German film about Rosemarie Nitribitt
- "Rosemarie", song by Mickey Dolenz from the 1987 album, Missing Links
- V 310 Rosemarie - a Kriegsmarine vorpostenboot that served as a fishing trawler before and after the Second World War
- HMS Rosemary, a British sloop that served during both world wars.
- Rosemary, from Delicious Party Pretty Cure

== See also ==
- Rosemary's Baby, a horror novel
- Rosemary's Baby (film), a film based on above novel.
- Mary Rose (disambiguation)
- Rose Marie (disambiguation)
- Rose (disambiguation)
- Mary (disambiguation)
