= Ghost Town (Poco album) =

Studio album by Poco
- Released: 20 September 1982
- Studio: Soundcastle and Capitol Studios (Hollywood, California); Jennifudy Studios North Hollywood, CA
- Genre: Country rock
- Length: 35:45
- Label: Atlantic
- Producer: Poco, John Mills

Poco chronology
| Cowboys & Englishmen (1982) | Ghost Town (1982) | Inamorata (1984) |

Professional ratings
Review scores
| Source | Rating |
|---|---|
| AllMusic | 3/5 stars |
| The Encyclopedia of Popular Music | 2/5 stars |

Ghost Town is the fifteenth studio album by the country rock band Poco, released September 20, 1982. The Atlantic Records label debut of Poco, Ghost Town was the final album by Poco to feature the group lineup who had played on Poco's 1978 breakout album Legend, as the 1984 Poco album release Inamorata would not feature Charlie Harrison.

After the gold certified success of the 1978 ABC Records album release Legend, Poco's three subsequent album releases on MCA Records - who had absorbed ABC - failed to reach that level of success. Ghost Town marked Poco's move to Atlantic Records with no resultant comeback peaking at #195 on the album chart in Billboard magazine, well below the peak of the group's final MCA album Cowboys & Englishmen which had been released in February 1982 to reach a chart peak of #131.

The first single from Ghost Town was the title cut which failed to reach the U.S. Billboard Hot 100, "bubbling under" with a peak of #108. The second single "Shoot for the Moon," while more successful fell short of the Top 40 with a Hot 100 peak of #50 in March 1983. On the Cash Box chart, the song reached #44. It breached the Top 10 on the U.S. Adult Contemporary chart, peaking at #10.

A third single release: "Break of Hearts" - cited as one of his favorite overlooked compositions by Paul Cotton who's described the song as a follow-up to Poco's 1979 Top 20 hit "Heart of the Night" - failed to chart. Cotton has stated that Poco had problems with Atlantic Records: Poco would record one more album for Atlantic: Inamorata released in April 1984, then take a hiatus from recording until 1989 when the RCA Records release Legacy became Poco's second gold certified album.

== Track listing ==
1. "Ghost Town" (Rusty Young) – 5:42
2. "How Will You Feel Tonight" (Paul Cotton) – 3:38
3. "Shoot For The Moon" (Rusty Young) – 2:48
4. "The Midnight Rodeo (In The Lead Tonight)" (Paul Cotton) – 2:39
5. "Cry No More" (Rusty Young) – 3:33
6. "Break Of Hearts" (Paul Cotton) – 4:28
7. "Love's So Cruel" (Rusty Young) – 3:02
8. "Special Care" (Paul Cotton) – 2:42
9. "When Hearts Collide" (Rusty Young) – 3:33
10. "High Sierra" (Paul Cotton) – 3:40

== Personnel ==
Poco

- Kim Bullard – keyboards, Prophet-5, backing vocals
- Paul Cotton – guitars, lead vocals, backing vocals
- Rusty Young – pedal steel guitar, guitars, lead vocals, backing vocals
- Charlie Harrison – bass, backing vocals
- Steve Chapman – drums

Additional musicians

- Steve Forman – percussion
- Phil Kenzie – saxophone (6)
- Buell Neidlinger – bass
- Armand Karpoff – cello
- Denise Subotnile – guitar, viola, backing vocals
- Nick DeCaro – string arrangements
- Eddie Karam – conductor
- Frank DeCaro – contractor
- Harry Bluestone – concertmaster

== Production ==
- Poco – producers
- John Mills – producer, engineer, mixing
- David Marquette – engineer
- Don Henderson – assistant engineer
- Karen Siegel – assistant engineer
- Mike Reese – mastering at The Mastering Lab (Hollywood, California).
- Phil Hartman – cover design
- Jim Shea – photography
