= Candy Eyed =

Studio album by Katy Rose
- Released: June 4, 2007
- Recorded: March–May 2007
- Genre: Alternative dance; dance-rock; pop rock
- Length: 31:29
- Label: River Jones
- Producer: Kim Bullard

Katy Rose chronology
| Because I Can (2004) | Candy Eyed (2007) |

Candy Eyed is the second studio album by American singer-songwriter Katy Rose. It was released digitally on June 4, 2007, by River Jones Music, being Rose's only release with the label.

== Track listing ==
| No. | Title | Length |
|---|---|---|
| 1. | "Love Is Suicide" | 2:42 |
| 2. | "Rosemary" | 3:20 |
| 3. | "Monotone" | 1:13 |
| 4. | "Cool Whip" | 2:26 |
| 5. | "Pornography" | 3:49 |
| 6. | "Sloth" | 3:25 |
| 7. | "Happy Crazy" | 3:31 |
| 8. | "Dancin' For" | 3:05 |
| 9. | "All Silver Rusts" | 4:45 |
| 10. | "Unprofessional" | 3:15 |
| Total length: | | 00:31:29 |
