= Kim Bullard =

American keyboardist and composer

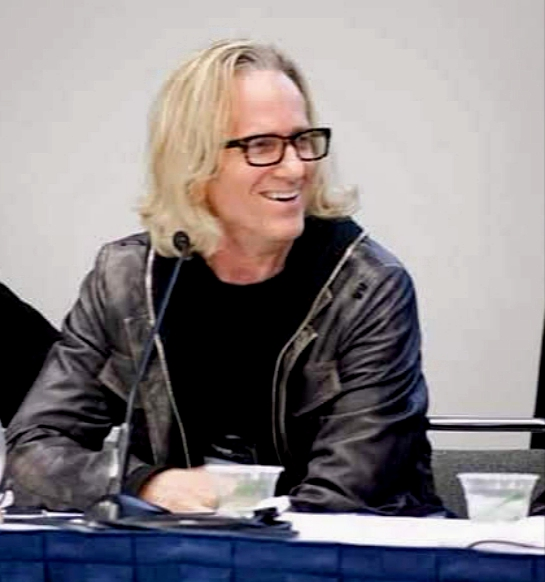
- Bullard at the NAMM Show, 2014

Background information
- Born: Jeffrey Kim Bullard; May 6, 1955 (age 71); Atlanta, Georgia, U.S.
- Genres: Rock; pop rock; classical
- Occupations: Musician; songwriter; film composer; record producer
- Instrument: Keyboards
- Years active: 1972–present
- Member of: Elton John Band
- Formerly of: Crosby, Stills, & Nash; Poco

Kim Bullard (born May 6, 1955) is an American keyboardist, songwriter, record producer, and film composer. He has been making music since the 1970s and has performed extensively as a keyboard player with musical acts such as Elton John and Crosby, Stills, & Nash.

As a recording studio session player he has played piano, keyboards, and synthesizer with recording artists Yes, Santana, Kenny Loggins, Heart, Belinda Carlisle, The Doobie Brothers, Tori Amos, Kelly Clarkson, and Carrie Underwood among numerous others.

Bullard was a longstanding band member of the band Poco, and is currently a member of the Elton John Band.

== Early life ==
Bullard was born and raised in Atlanta, Georgia, where he began playing piano at five years old. He attributes much of his success as a pianist to his mother's support, and his desire to learn piano.

== Music career ==
=== Crosby, Stills, & Nash (1977-1979) ===
Bullard moved to Los Angeles, California in 1973 and began performing with various musicians, which led to him being hired by French recording artist Veronique Sanson as her keyboard player and music director. Bullard had formed a band in Los Angeles which he brought with him to France to perform and record with Sanson. He lived in France from 1975 to 1976 during which time he met Veronique's husband, Stephen Stills of Crosby, Stills, & Nash who would later offer Kim a touring position with Crosby, Stills, & Nash in 1977 as a keyboard player, which he accepted. Kim toured with CSN from 1977 to 1979.

=== Poco (1978–1983) ===
Bullard joined Poco in December 1978 just as Legend was being released, performing keyboards and backing vocals with the group.

During the first half of the 1980s, the group released five more albums which Bullard played keyboards and sang on, these albums were, Under the Gun (1980), Blue And Gray (1981), Cowboys & Englishmen (1982), Ghost Town (1982) and Inamorata (1984). Bullard toured extensively with the band from 1978 to 1983. Poco's album, Cowboys & Englishmen was nominated for a Grammy Award in 1983.

Bullard left Poco to rejoin Crosby, Stills & Nash in 1983.

=== Katy Rose (2004) ===
Bullard began working with his daughter, Katy Rose on vocals and songwriting in the studio was she was just twelve years old. By the time Rose was sixteen years old, he produced her album, Because I Can for V2 Records, which was released on January 27, 2004, along with "Overdrive", her first single from the album. "Overdrive" also appears on the Mean Girls soundtrack. "Lemon" is featured on the Thirteen soundtrack. Both songs are featured on Because I Can.

=== Elton John (2009–present) ===
Through Bullard's session work in Los Angeles, he recorded and toured with people who worked with Elton John. When keyboard player Guy Babylon died, Bullard was asked to become the keyboardist for the Elton John Band. Kim's first performance as a member of the Elton John Band took place on October 7, 2009, in Moscow.

== Discography ==
Year	Album	Artist	Credit
2017	Squeeze Box	"Weird Al" Yankovic	Keyboards, Synthesizer
2016	The Complete Hits and More!	Eddie Money	Keyboard Arrangements, Keyboards, Synthesizer Arrangements
2016	Wonderful Crazy Night	Elton John	Keyboards
2013	Milking the Stars: A Re-Imagining of Last Patrol	Monster Magnet	Organ
2012	Christmas in the Sand	Colbie Caillat	Keyboards, Programming
2012	Never Look Back	Electric Touch	Keyboards, Programming
2011	All of You	Colbie Caillat	Sequencing
2011	Alpocalypse	Weird Al Yankovic	Keyboards
2011	Cycles/Brotherhood	The Doobie Brothers	Keyboards
2011	Ghost on the Canvas	Glen Campbell	Keyboards
2011	Stronger	Kelly Clarkson	Keyboards, Programming
2011	The Best of Franke & the Knockouts: Sweetheart	Franke & The Knockouts	Featured Artist
2011	Time of My Life	3 Doors Down	Keyboards, Programming
2011	Under the Gun/Blue Gray	Poco	Keyboards, Vocals
2010	11:59	Ryan Star	Keyboards, Programming
2010	Believe (ll)	Orianthi	Keyboards
2010	Feeding the Wolves	10 Years	Keyboards
2010	Found All The Parts/Busted	Cheap Trick	Keyboards
2010	Grace and Gratitude Renewed	Olivia Newton-John	Composer
2010	Guitar Heaven: The Greatest Guitar Classics of All Time	Santana	Keyboards, Programming
2010	Jason Castro	Jason Castro	Keyboards, Programming
2010	Joy	Fefe Dobson	Keyboards, Programming
2010	Maya	M.I.A	Programming
2010	Suddenly Yours	Allstar Weekend	Keyboards, Synthesizer
2010	The Essential "Weird Al" Yankovic: Limited Edition 3.0	Weird Al Yankovic	Keyboards, Programming
2010	Who I Am	Jason Castro	Keyboards
2009	A Very Special Christmas 7		Keyboards
2009	All I Ever Wanted	Kelly Clarkson	Keyboards, Programming
2009	Dangerous Liaisons	Sylvia Brooks	Producer, engineer
2009	Just Like You	Allison Iraheta	Keyboards
2009	The Boy Who Never	Landon Pigg	Keyboards, Programming
2009	The Essential Weird Al Yankovic	Weird Al Yankovic	Keyboards, Synthesizer
2008	Meet Glen Campbell	Glen Campbell	Keyboards
2008	Renai Kodoku Bito	Yuko Ishikawa	Synthesizer
2008	The Coolest Songs in the World, Vol. 5		Keyboards
2007	Blades of Glory (Original Motion Picture Soundtrack)		Keyboards
2007	Grace and Gratitude	Olivia Newton-John	Composer
2006	Collections	Amanda Marshall	Composer
2006	Eclectic Cafe: The Complete Coffee House Collection		Producer, composer
2006	Greatest Hits	The Rembrandts	Guest Artist, Clarinet
2006	Greatest Hits	Enuff Z'nuff	Guest Artist, Piano, Keyboards
2006	I Will	Tracy Lyons	Organ
2006	Life Lessons: The Best of Amy Sky	Amy Sky	Producer, engineer, arranger, Mixing, Keyboards, composer
2006	Love, Death, & Customer Service	Lauren Wood	Engineer, Audio Engineer, Mixing, Main Personnel, Bass Instrument, Programming, Drum Programming, Sampling, Synthesizer Programming
2006	Reach	Survivor	Keyboards, Programming, Bass
2006	Rockford	Cheap Trick	Keyboards
2006	Straight Outta Lynwood	Weird Al Yankovic	Keyboards
2006	Stronger Than Before	Olivia Newton-John	Mixing
2006	The Best of Candlebox	Candlebox	Piano, Organ, Additional Music
2005	American Idol Season 4: The Showstoppers		Piano, Organ, Keyboards, Programming, String Arrangements
2005	Chronicles	Cher	Keyboards
2005	Do You Miss Me	Robin Beck	Composer, lyricist
2005	Inside Your Heaven	Carrie Underwood	Organ
2005	Inside Your Heaven	Bo Bice	Organ
2005	Just Yesterday	Al Stewart	Keyboards
2005	Self Help Serenade	Marjorie Fair	Keyboards, Organ
2004	?	Enuff Z'Nuff	Keyboards
2004	Because I Can	Katy Rose	Producer, engineer, arranger, Mixing, Guitar, Keyboards, Programming, String Arrangements, composer
2004	Con la Sondon Metropolitan Orchestra, Vol. 2	Ricardo Montaner	Synthesizer
2004	Favorites	Enuff Z'Nuff	Piano, Keyboards
2004	Going the Distance		Producer, composer
2004	Intermission	Amanda Marshall	Composer
2004	Mean Girls		Composer
2004	Planet Pop, Vol. 6		Producer, composer
2004	Team America: World Police		Engineer
2004	Tripped into Divine	Dexter Freebish	Piano
2003	Agent Cody Banks		Producer, composer
2003	Circle	Suzy K.	Producer, Mixing, composer
2003	Circle (Vellem Bonus Disc)	Suzy K.	
2003	Fitmix: Walking		Composer
2003	Introducing...Al Stewart	Al Stewart	Keyboards, Violin
2003	Peter Reckell	Peter Reckell	Mixing
2003	Poodle Hat	Weird Al Yankovic	Keyboards
2003	The Essential Eddie Money	Eddie Money	Keyboards, Synthesizer
2003	The Essential Shawn Mullins	Shawn Mullins	Organ, Mellotron, Keyboards, Programming, Loops
2003	Then and Now	Eddie Money	Producer
2003	Thirteen		Composer
2003	Through the Basement Wals	Kelly Moneymaker	Piano, Organ
2003	Untold	Pete Francis	Organ
2002	125 Songs For Kids		Keyboards
2002	A Place to Land	Dakota Moon	Organ
2002	Gutterflower	Goo Goo Dolls	Programming
2002	Revolucion de Amor	Mana	Keyboards
2002	Santo Pecado	Ricardo Arjona	Organ
2002	The Country Bears		Synthesizer
2001	Down for the Get Down	Youngstown	Keyboards, Programming
2001	Greatest Hits	The Doobie Brothers	Keyboards
2001	How Was Tomorrow?	The Cash Brothers	Keyboards
2001	Makin' the Point	Franke & the Knockouts	Producer
2001	Positively Somewhere	Jennifer Paige	Producer, Keyboards, Programming
2001	Roots Music: An American Journey		Keyboards
2001	Sugar	Youngstown	Keyboards, Programming
2001	The Wedding Planner		Producer
2000	As I Am	Suzy K	Producer, engineer, arranger, Keyboards, Programming, String Arrangements, composer
2000	Beneath The Velvet Sun	Shawn Mullins	Clavinet, Organ, Chamberlin, Mellotron, Programming, Loops
2000	Bueninvento	Julieta Venegas	Organ
2000	Back For Me	Penny Framstad	Organ
2000	Disney's Greatest Hits	Disney	Programming
2000	Fortress	Sister Hazel	Strings, Mellotron, Loops
2000	Key of a Minor	Jessica Riddle	Producer, Keyboards, composer
2000	Music by W.G. Snuffy Walden	W.G. Snuffy Walden	Organ, Keyboards, Drum Programming, Synthesizer, Programming
2000	Original Gold	Belinda Carlisle	Keyboards
2000	Something to Say	Richie Kotzen	Organ
2000	The Harsh Light of Day	Fastball	Piano, Organ, Keyboards, Synthesizer, Loops
2000	The Love Songs Album No. 2		Composer
2000	True North	Fisher	Producer, Keyboards
2000	Whatever It Takes	Original Soundtrack	Composer
1999	10 Things I Hate About You	Original Soundtrack	Producer, composer
1999	Buckcherry	Buckcherry	Keyboards
1999	Chaque Feu...	Roch Voisine	Programming, Clavier
1999	Live: Now & Then	Marc Jordan	Composer
1999	Running With Scissors	Weird Al Yankovic	Keyboards
1999	Shake, Rattle & Roll	Original TV Soundtrack	Piano
1999	Sweetheart Collection	Franke & The Knockouts	Keyboards
1999	Takoma Eclectic Sampler, Vol. 2		Synthesizer
1999	Tarzan	Phil Collins Mark Mancina	Programming, Track Programmer
1999	The Color Within Me	Janice Robinson	Organ, Programming, String Arrangements
1999	The First Ten Years	Shawn Mullins	Keyboards, Programming
1999	The Other Sister		Programming
1998	All the Pain Money Can Buy	Fastball	Organ, Keyboards, Programming
1998	Bathhouse Betty	Bette Midler	Arranger, Piano, Keyboards
1998	Capricorn	Mike Tramp	Organ, Mellotron
1998	Happy Pills	Candlebox	Piano, Organ
1998	Road Cases	Foghat	Organ
1997	Couleurs de l'Amour	Native	Engineer
1997	Diez Anos de Rock en Tu Idioma		Producer
1997	Greatest Hits	The Party	Producer
1997	Lauren Wood 1997	Lauren Wood	Composer
1997	Legend's Diner	Rick Monroe	Keyboards
1997	Lounge-A-Palooza		Mellotron
1997	North Hollywood	Slush	Keyboards
1997	Shakin' with the Money Man	Eddie Money	Producer, Mixing, Keyboards, Programming
1997	Takoma Eclectic Sampler		Vocals, Keyboards
1996	All The Best	Tiffany	Producer, composer
1996	Amanda Marshall	Amanda Marshall	Composer
1996	Disney's Music From The Park	Disney	Horn Arrangements
1996	In Harmony With the Homeless		Organ, Keyboards
1996	Kissing Rain	Roch Voisine	Keyboards, Programming, Pre-Production
1996	Nydia Rojas	Nydia Rojas	Producing, Mixing
1996	Paris in April	April March	Engineer
1996	Shelter Me	Richard Page	Engineer
1995	Am I still in Your Heart	Chuck Negron	Programming, Drum Programming
1995	Chick Habit	April March	Engineer
1995	Further Down the Spiral	Nine Inch Nails	Guest Artist, Beats
1995	Ghost Town/Inamorata	Poco	Vocals, Keyboards
1995	Grandes Exitos	Miguel Mateos	Producer
1995	The Mighty Morphin Power Rangers	Original Soundtrack	Keyboards
1995	Time Was	Curtis Stigers	Producer, Keyboards, Programming
1994	Arrive All Over You	Danielle Brisebois	Keyboards
1994	Greatest Hits, Vol. 2	Weird Al Yankovic	Keyboards
1994	The Downward Spiral	Nine Inch Nails	Beats
1993	Animals with Human Intelligence	Enuff Z'Nuff	Keyboards, Keyboard Arrangements
1993	Coctel	Miguel Mateos	Producer, arranger, Organ
1993	Forever Diana: Musical Memoirs	Diana Ross	Composer
1993	Let's Get Started	Louie Louie	Horn, Keyboards, Drums, Steel Drums
1993	Open Skyz	Open Skyz	Strings, Keyboards, Drums, Percussion, Keyboard Programming
1993	Postcards from the Artic	Springhouse	Keyboards
1993	Robin Zander	Robin Zander	Keyboards, Synthesizer
1993	Soul on Board	Curt Smith	Keyboards
1993	Tempted	Mitsou	Producer
1993	Za-Za	Bulletboys	Keyboards, Piano
1992	A Different Man	Peter Kingsbery	Engineer
1992	Salute	21 Guns	Piano
1992	Snake Bite Love	Zachary Richard	Organ Keyboards
1992	The Hunter	Jennifer Warnes	Keyboards
1992	The Rembrandts	The Rembrandts	Clavinet
1991	Dazzling Display	Steve Wyn	Keyboards
1991	Live Your Life Be Free	Belinda Carlisle	Keyboards
1991	Mane Attraction	White Lion	Keyboards, Synthesizer, Organd
1991	Right Here	Eddie Money	Engineer, Keyboards
1991	Rush Street	Richard Marx	Keyboards
1991	The Legend of Prince Valliant	Original TV Soundtrack	Mixing
1990	Brigade	Heart	Keyboards
1990	Busted	Cheap Trick	Keyboards
1990	C.O.W. (Conserve Our World)	Marc Jordan	Piano, Keyboards, Bass, composer
1990	Leader of the Banned	Sam Kinison	Keyboards, Vocals (Background)
1990	Money Talks	Money Talks (soundtrack)	Producer, composer, arranger, Keyboards
1990	The Best of Bill Medley	Bill Medley	Producer, Keyboards
1989	Crazy Loving: The Best of Poco 1975–1982	Poco	Keyboards
1989	Cycles	The Doobie Brothers	Keyboards
1989	Heart Like a Gun	Fiona	Keyboards
1989	Kings of Sleep	Stuart Hamm	Composer
1989		Steve Lukather	Keyboards
1989	Oh Yes I Can	David Crosby	Synthesizer
1989	Rockland	Kim Mitchell	Keyboards
1989	The Karate Kid, Pt. 3		Producer
1989	True Cool	David Hallyday	Keyboards, composer
1989	UHF	Weird Al Yankovic	Synthesizer
1988	Back to Avalon	Kenny Loggins	Keyboards, Programming
1988	Even Worse	Weird Al Yankovic	Synthesizer
1988	Nothing to Lose	Eddie Money	Arranger, Keyboards, Synthesizer
1988	Y Kant Tori Read	Y Kant Tori Read	Producer, Piano, Keyboards, Programming, composer
1987	Big Generator	Yes	Keyboard Programming
1987	Desperately Seeking Susan & Making Mr. Right:Original Soundtracks of Susan Seidelman:	Thomas Newman	Electronics
1987	Talking Though Pictures	Marc Jordan	Producer, Keyboards, Bass
1986	No Easy Way Out	Robert Tepper	Keyboards
	Solos en América	Miguel Mateos/ZAS	Producer
1985	My Obsession	Meri D. Marshall	Keyboards, Synthesizer
1984	Inamorta	Poco	Vocals, Keyboards
1984	Right by You	Stephen Stills	Keyboards
1983	Uncle Wonderful	Janice Ian	Keyboards, composer
1982	Cowboys & Englishmen	Poco	Vocals, Keyboards
1982	Ghost Town	Poco	Vocals, Keyboards
1981	Blue and Gray	Poco	Vocals, Keyboards
1980	La Toya Jackson	La Toya Jackson	Synthesizer
1980	No Nukes		Vocals, Keyboards-
1980	Under the Gun	Poco	Vocals, Keyboards
1978	Hollywood	Veronique Sanson	Vocals
1978	Mannequin	Marc Jordan	Remastering, Re-issue
1978	Drew's Famous Instrumental Pop Collection, Vol. 84		Composer, lyricist
1978	He's My Girl		Producer, performer, Primary Artist
1978	Life in the Slaw Lane	Kip Addotta	Producer, composer
1978	Party Tyme Karaoke	Pop Female Hits	Composer
1978	The Undivided	Blush	Programming
