= Indian Love Call =

Song composed by Herbert Stothart, Rudolf Friml

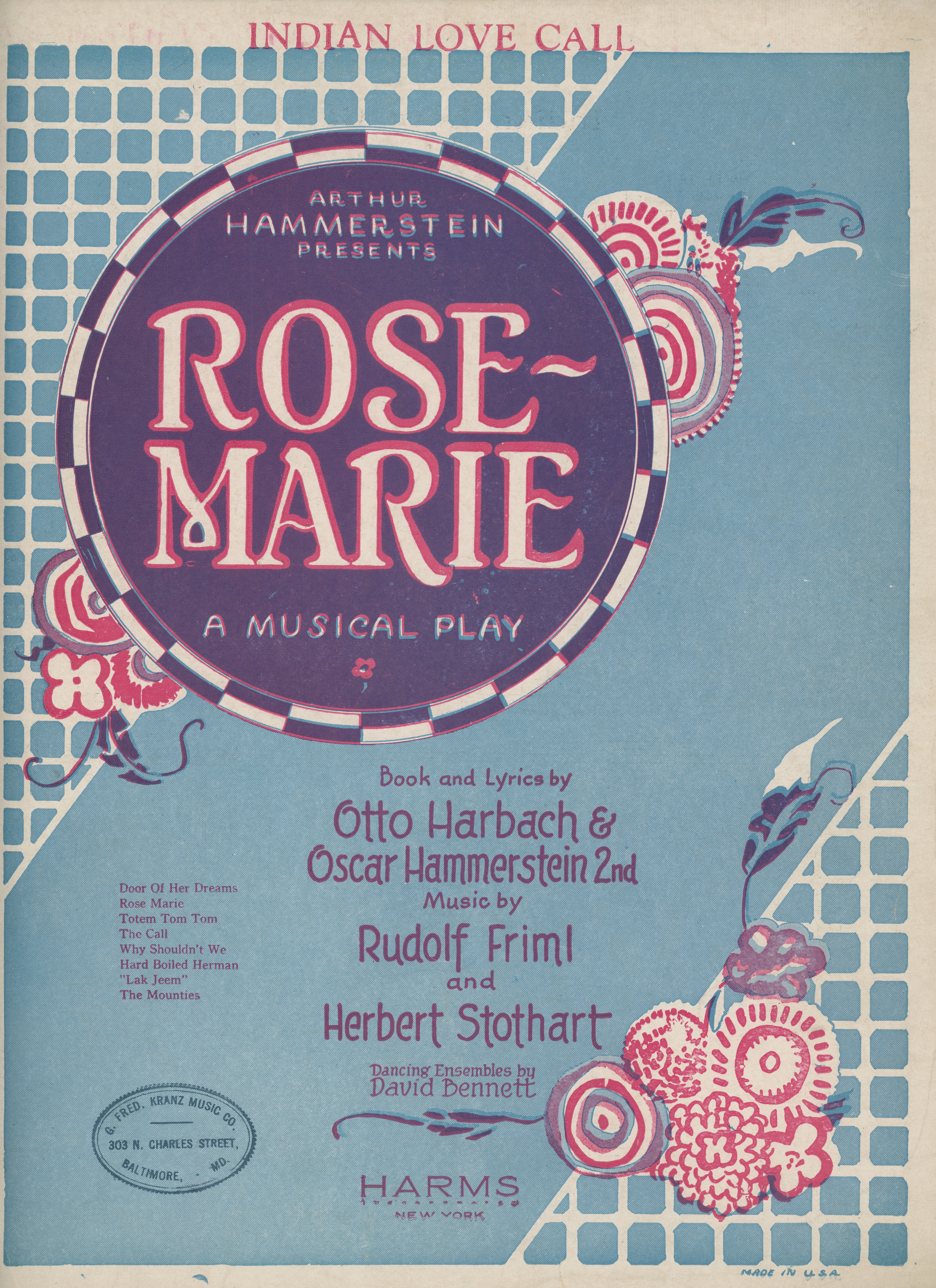
- Indian Love Call sheet music cover (1924)

Song by Rudolf Friml & Herbert Stothart
- Published: September 2, 1924
- Released: 1925
- Recorded: October 12, 1924
- Length: 3:13
- Label: Columbia Records
- Composers: Rudolf Friml; Herbert Stothart
- Lyricists: Otto Harbach; Oscar Hammerstein II

"Indian Love Call" (first published as "The Call") is a popular song from Rose-Marie, a 1924 operetta-style Broadway musical with music by Rudolf Friml and Herbert Stothart, and book and lyrics by Otto Harbach and Oscar Hammerstein II. Originally written for Mary Ellis, the song achieved continued popularity under other artists and has been called Friml's best-remembered work.

The play takes place within the Canadian Rocky Mountains and features the sonorous tune in the overture and in Act One while the love interests call to each other per a supposed Aboriginal Canadian legend about how men would call down into the valley to the girls they wished to marry. In most (or all) versions of Rose-Marie, including the best-known movie version, the tune is reprised several times throughout the narrative.

== Popularity ==
Rose-Marie was the longest-running musical of the 1920s, enjoyed international success, and became the basis of four films with the same title. As the musical's biggest hit, "Indian Love Call" outlived its origins. The New York Times described the song as being among those Rudolf Friml songs that became "household staples" in their era. The song was said to have been a favorite of President Dwight D. Eisenhower.

== Nelson Eddy and Jeanette MacDonald version ==
"Indian Love Call (Also The Call)"

Song by Nelson Eddy and Jeanette MacDonald
- Published: September 2, 1924 Harms, Inc., New York
- Genre: pop, folk
- Composers: Rudolf Friml, Herbert Stothart
- Lyricists: Otto Harbach, Oscar Hammerstein II

When Nelson Eddy and Jeanette MacDonald performed the song as a duet in the 1936 film version of Rose Marie, it was a hit that remained a signature song for the two singers throughout their careers. As featured in the 1936 film version, Nelson Eddy as Sergeant Bruce and Jeanette MacDonald as Rose Marie are alone by a lakeside campfire. They hear a distant and haunting call across the lake, which Bruce tells her is "just an Indian". They listen and hear in the distance a mysterious feminine voice make its reply. The rest of the scene has been summarized thus:

It is an old Indian legend, he tells her. Years ago two lovers from different tribes met here. Their families were enemies, sort of a Romeo and Juliet affair. They were discovered and sentenced to die, but their spirits still live. When a lover gives the call, their spirits echo it, sending it on until it reaches the one he loves. Rose Marie is moved by the beauty of it. She stands at the edge of the lake and gives the haunting call. Sergeant Bruce takes it up and sings the classic "Indian Love Call".

That same night, after Rose Marie has gone to her tent, she hums the song while beside the campfire and Sergeant Bruce quietly hums the response. In a dramatic moment later in the play, after Sergeant Bruce rides off on his horse to arrest Rose Marie's brother for murder, she sings "Indian Love Call" in an attempt to summon him back. Still later, as Rose Marie performs the last act of Puccini's Tosca, she hears the voice of Bruce singing "Indian Love Call". Finally, she "hits a perfect high note and collapses in the middle of the stage".

Nelson Eddy and Jeanette MacDonald's recording of "Indian Love Call" (with "Ah, Sweet Mystery of Life" from Naughty Marietta on the B-side) sold over a million copies, was included in the 1974 compilation film That's Entertainment!, and was inducted into the Grammy Hall of Fame in 2008. It was the only song from the stage score that MacDonald recorded, although Eddy recorded a number of songs from Rose Marie, including a different version of "Indian Love Call" performed as a duet with Dorothy Kirsten.

Plugging into the popularity of the Eddy and MacDonald version of this song and attempting to avoid confusion with the 1954 remake of Rose Marie, the 1936 version of the movie was broadcast on television under the title Indian Love Call.

== Slim Whitman version ==
"Indian Love Call"

Single by Slim Whitman
- A-side: "Indian Love Call" "China Doll"
- Released: 1952
- Recorded: 1952
- Genre: Country
- Length: 2:30
- Label: Imperial
- Songwriters: Otto Harbach; Oscar Hammerstein II; Rudolf Friml

Slim Whitman singles chronology
"Cold Empty Arms" / "In a Hundred Years or More" (1952)	"Indian Love Call" / "China Doll" (1952)	"An Amateur in Love" / "By the Waters of the Minnetonka" (1952)

Audio
- "Indian Love Call" on YouTube

Professional ratings
Review scores
Source	Rating
Billboard	positive

In 1952, yodeling cowboy singer Slim Whitman released a version of "Indian Love Call" as his second single. The song peaked at number two on the country charts, crossing over into the pop music Top Ten, and made Whitman a star. It was also a top ten hit in the UK in 1955.

=== Track listing ===
7-inch single (Imperial 45-8156, 1952, United States)
No.	Title	Writer(s)	Length
1.	"Indian Love Call"	Otto Harbach; Oscar Hammerstein II; Rudolf Friml	2:30
2.	"China Doll"	Gerald Cannan; Kenny Cannan	2:32

7-inch single (London Records 45-HL 1149, November 1952, reissued in 1955, UK)
No.	Title	Writer(s)	Length
1.	"Indian Love Call" (from Rose Marie)	Rudolf Friml; Otto Harbach; Oscar Hammerstein II	2:30
2.	"China Doll"	Gerald Cannan; Kenny Cannan	2:32

=== Charts ===
Chart (1952)	Peak position
U.S. Billboard Best Selling Pop Singles	top 10
U.S. Billboard Top Country & Western Records — National Best Sellers	2
U.S. Billboard Most Played Juke Box Folk (Country & Western) Records	2
Chart (1955)	Peak position
UK Singles (Official Charts)	7

== Other versions ==
- In 1925, saxophonist Isham Jones recorded a version.
- In 1938, Artie Shaw and His Orchestra released a version of "Indian Love Call", but it was the B-side – a version of Cole Porter's "Begin the Beguine" – that rocketed Artie Shaw into celebrity.
- In 1939, whistler Fred Lowery released a version that sold over 2 million copies.
- In 1951, Chet Atkins released a version of "Indian Love Call" as a single, which was then included on various albums, including Stringin' Along with Chet Atkins and The Best of Chet Atkins.
- In 1958, Ernie Freeman released his (shuffle swing) instrumental version of this song.
- Also in 1958, Duke Ellington's band recorded a version of it on the album Duke Ellington at the Bal Masque.
- In 1962, Karl Denver's single of this song reached No. 32 on the charts in the United Kingdom.
- Also in 1962, trumpeter Louis Armstrong recorded a version.
- In 1963, Anna Moffo and Sergio Franchi recorded this song in their popular RCA Victor Red Seal album The Dream Duet.
- Soul singer Gloria Lynne released a version of this song in 1964 as a B-side to "I Should Care".
- In 1965, Kenny Roberts recorded "Indian Love Call" on an album of the same name.
- Between 1972 and 1974, the song was covered by Singapore-based female singer Ervinna, backing music by The Charlie & His Boys, on her LP Golden Hits Of 20th Century Vol. 4 with the local White Cloud Record.
- Mexican Ranchera singer Vicente Fernández release a Spanish-language version titled "Amor Indio" (Indian Love) on his 1974 album El Ídolo de México.
- Country singer Ray Stevens, known primarily for novelty music, released a version of "Indian Love Call" in 1975, reaching #68 on the US Hot 100 and No. 38 on the U.S. country charts with it. The song was part of an album of covers of pop music standards.
- Sara Davis Buechner included this song on her CD Rudolf Friml Piano Works.

== Use in popular culture ==
- The 1996 film Mars Attacks! uses a recording of Whitman's version to kill off the Martians by way of their brains full of green goo exploding as a crucial deus ex machina.
- In chapter 10 of the 1960 children's book – The Cricket in Times Square, a cat named Harry hums a few lines to the radio.
- At one of Mary Martin's first auditions in Hollywood, she announced her intention to sing "in my soprano voice, a song you probably don't know, 'Indian Love Call'". After her singing the song, "a tall, craggly man who looked like a mountain" told Martin that he thought she had something special and told her, "Oh, and by the way, I know that song. I wrote it." The man was Oscar Hammerstein and the event marked the start of her career.
- Spike Jones performed a characteristically zany interpretation of this song on The Spike Jones Show.
- In the 1976–1977 first season of the Muppet Show, the muppets Wayne and Wanda performed a short (0:32) duet of this song.
- In the 1989 Jim Henson TV special, Dog City, the song is referenced with a pun that ends the film: the main character, Ace Yu, proposes to his love interest Colleen, and she sings "when I'm Colleen Yu" to the tune of the song.
- Rainier Beer of Seattle, Washington, spoofed the song in 1977 for their commercial campaign, featuring Mickey Rooney and his wife, Jan, in costume. Two versions were released: one, where Rooney blindly pours a beer into a glass held by Jan at the commercial's end; and another, where the beer is poured blindly down Jan's cleavage.
- When Jason Danieley and Marin Mazzie performed this song as an opening number at a Valentine's Day 2009 performance at the John F. Kennedy Center for the Performing Arts, The Washington Post described how "Mazzie trilled 'Indian Love Call' from the stage, Danieley crooned in return, traipsing down the Terrace Theater aisle as if struck by Cupid's arrow."
- The first verse is sung by an offscreen narrator in Nickelodeon's 1995 television special Oh, Brother featuring Stick Stickly, who seeks his twin brother in New York City.
- Brendan Fraser and Sarah Jessica Parker performed a version of the song in the 1999 film Dudley Do-Right.
- The song was spoofed on Sesame Street as "I'm in Love with U" and "Maiden Love."
- In 2016, Sarah Paulson performed a short rendition in American Horror Story: Freak Show.
- In 2023, Slim Whitman's version of "Indian Love Call" was included on the soundtrack to the film Asteroid City by Wes Anderson.

== See also ==
- Billboard Top Country & Western Records of 1952
