= Old Flame (Poco song) =

Single by Juice Newton

from the album Old Flame
- B-side: "One Touch"
- Released: April 5, 1986
- Genre: Country
- Length: 3:01
- Label: RCA Nashville
- Songwriter(s): Reed Nielsen
- Producer(s): Richard Landis

Juice Newton singles chronology
"Hurt" (1985)	"Old Flame" (1986)	"Both to Each Other (Friends and Lovers)" (1986)

"Old Flame" is a song written by Reed Nielsen, and recorded by American country music artist Juice Newton. It was released in April 1986 as the third single and title track from her 1985 album Old Flame. Originally recorded and released by Poco as "This Old Flame" in 1984 from their album Inamorata, their version failed to chart. The song reached No. 5 on the Billboard Hot Country Singles & Tracks chart.

== Charts ==
Chart (1986)	Peak position
US Hot Country Songs (Billboard)	5
Canadian RPM Country Tracks	3
