= Blue and Gray (album) =

Studio album by Poco
- Released: July 1981
- Genre: Country rock
- Length: 38:25
- Label: MCA
- Producer: Mike Flicker

Poco chronology
Under the Gun (1980)	Blue and Gray (1981)	Cowboys & Englishmen (1982)

Blue and Gray is the thirteenth studio album by the American country rock band Poco, released in 1981. The album is a theme-based record, similar to Desperado by The Eagles, only the theme on this record is the American Civil War. The band scored minor chart success with "Widowmaker". The colors in the title refer to United States Army and Confederate States Army uniforms of the period, respectively.

== Reception ==
Professional ratings
Review scores
Source	Rating
AllMusic	3/5 stars
The Encyclopedia of Popular Music	2/5 stars

In his AllMusic review, music critic Bruce Eder wrote, "this isn't a bad album, and at least benefits from more energy and ambition than its immediate predecessor, Under the Gun. There's some fine playing throughout and generally good singing, and some of the writing is inspired, although there are some lapses into lightweight, unmemorable fare also. A little more consistency might have lofted this album to the level of the band's best recent work, but it's still worth hearing as one of the more ambitious records ever to come from this long-lived country-rock band—and it certainly didn't deserve the obscurity that enveloped it."

== Track listing ==
1. "Glorybound" (Rusty Young) – 3:35
2. "Blue and Gray" (Young) – 4:40
3. "Streets of Paradise" (Paul Cotton) – 3:55
4. "The Writing on the Wall" (Young) – 3:10
5. "Down on the River Again" (Cotton) – 3:45
6. "Please Wait for Me" (Cotton) – 4:30
7. "Widowmaker" (Young) – 4:25
8. "Here Comes That Girl Again" (Young) – 3:15
9. "Sometimes (We Are All We Got)" (Cotton) – 3:35
10. "The Land of Glory" (Young) – 3:35

== Personnel ==
Poco

- Kim Bullard – keyboards, backing vocals (1, 5, 6, 8, 9)
- Paul Cotton – electric guitar (1, 2, 4, 6, 8, 9, 10), backing vocals (1, 4, 7, 8), lead vocals (2, 3, 5, 6, 9), acoustic guitar (3, 5), lead guitar (7)
- Rusty Young – acoustic guitar (1, 2, 4, 8, 9), lead vocals (1, 2, 4, 7, 8, 10), electric guitar (3, 7, 10), backing vocals (3, 6, 9), dobro (5), mandolin (5, 6), banjo (9)
- Charlie Harrison – bass, backing vocals (1–9)
- Steve Chapman – drums

Additional musicians

- Steve Forman – percussion (1–4, 6, 7, 8, 10)
- Denise Decaro – backing vocals (7, 10)
- Venetta Fields – backing vocals (7, 10)
- Clydie King – backing vocals (7, 10)

== Production ==
- Mike Flicker – producer, engineer
- Joe Chiccarelli – engineer
- David Marquette – engineer, assistant engineer
- John Mills – engineer, mixing
- Mitch Gibson – assistant engineer
- Mike Reese – mastering
- Dennis Jones – studio coordinator
- Lew Llewellyn – studio coordinator
- George Osaki – art direction
- Michael Kevin Lee – album design
- Gribbitt! – design studio
- Recorded and Mixed at Soundcastle (Hollywood, California).
- Mastered at The Mastering Lab (Hollywood, California).
