= Inamorata (album) =

Studio album by Poco
- Released: April 16, 1984
- Genre: Country rock
- Length: 37:56
- Label: Atlantic
- Producer: Rusty Young, Paul Cotton, Joe Chiccarelli

Poco chronology
Ghost Town (1982)	Inamorata (1984)	Legacy (1989)

Inamorata is the sixteenth studio album by the country rock band Poco, released in 1984. Featuring guest spots by former members Timothy B. Schmit, Richie Furay and George Grantham (the only member missing from the classic years line up was Jim Messina), this would be the last album that the band would record for Atlantic Records. After this the original line up (Richie Furay, Rusty Young, Jim Messina, Randy Meisner and George Grantham) would reform for the 1989 release Legacy.

== Reception ==
Professional ratings
Review scores
Source	Rating
Allmusic	2/5 stars
Encyclopedia of Popular Music	3/5 stars

In his Allmusic review, music critic Rob Theakston wrote, "Armed with an armada of fresh ideas and a bright new overly chorused synthesizer, Poco all but abandons their country-rock roots in favor of a reverb heavy electronic drum kit, bright synths, and production that has not aged well. Even guest appearances by Poco alumni Timothy B. Schmit and Zappa drummer Vinnie Colaiuta can't save the group from serving up a lackluster and forgettable ten-song offering that would prove to be the group's swan song until their reunion in 1989."

== Track listing ==
1. "Days Gone By" (Paul Cotton) – 3:50
2. "This Old Flame" (Reed Nielsen) – 3:02
3. "Daylight" (Rusty Young) – 3:55
4. "Odd Man Out" (Cotton) – 3:06
5. "How Many Moons" (Cotton) – 4:30
6. "When You Love Someone" (Young) – 4:03
7. "Brenda X" (Cotton) – 3:38
8. "Standing in the Fire" (Cotton) – 3:46
9. "Save a Corner of Your Heart" (Young) – 3:41
10. "The Storm" (Young) – 4:25

== Personnel ==
Poco

- Kim Bullard – keyboards
- Paul Cotton – guitars, vocals
- Rusty Young – steel guitar, guitars, vocals
- Steve Chapman – drums, percussion

Guest musicians

- Richard Gibbs – keyboards
- Randy Kerber – keyboards
- George Doering – guitars
- Neil Stubenhaus – bass
- Vinnie Colaiuta – drums, percussion
- Steve Forman – drums, percussion
- Russ Powell – guitar
- Richie Furay – vocals
- George Grantham – vocals
- Timothy B. Schmit – vocals
- Richard Landis – rhythm track arrangements
- Charles Calello – string arrangements

== Production ==
- Paul Cotton – producer
- Rusty Young – producer
- Joe Chiccarelli – co-producer, engineer, mixing
- Bryan Bell – assistant engineer
- Ann Calnan – assistant engineer
- Csaba Petcoz – assistant engineer
- Gene Wooley – assistant engineer
- Greg Fulginiti – mastering
- Phil Hartman – cover design
- Stan Watts – cover illustration

Studios

- Recorded at Conway Studios, The Sound Factory, Doering Studio and Artisan Sound Recorders (Hollywood, California); Can-Am Recorders (Tarzana, California).
- Mixed at Capitol Studios (Hollywood, California).
- Mastered at Artisan Sound Recorders.
