= I'll Walk with God (album) =

Studio album by Slim Whitman
- Released: 1959
- Genre: Sacred
- Label: Imperial

Slim Whitman chronology
Slim Whitman Sings (1959)	I'll Walk with God (1959)	Slim Whitman Sings Million Record Hits (1960)

Singles from I'll Walk with God
- 1. "I'll Walk with God"

Professional ratings
Review scores
Source	Rating
AllMusic	3/5 stars
Billboard	2/4 stars
The Encyclopedia of Popular Music	3/5 stars

I'll Walk with God is a studio album by Slim Whitman, released in 1959 on Imperial Records.

== Release history ==
The album was issued in the United States by Imperial Records as a 12-inch long-playing record, catalog numbers LP 9088 (mono) and LP 12032 (stereo).

== Track listing ==
Side one
No.	Title	Length
1.	"I'll Walk with God"	3:08
2.	"Whispering Hope"	2:50
3.	"I'm a Pilgrim"	2:08
4.	"A Evening with Prayer"	2:23
5.	"Jesus Took My Burden"	2:11
6.	"Sunrise"	3:30

Side two
No.	Title	Length
1.	"Walk Beside Me"	2:11
2.	"Each Step I Take"	2:54
3.	"The Great Judgment Morning"	2:52
4.	"He Lives on High"	1:54
5.	"Today Is Mine"	1:46
6.	"When I Go to My Garden"	2:39
