= An Amateur in Love =

Single by Slim Whitman
- A-side: "An Amateur in Love" "By the Waters of the Minnetonka"
- Released: 1952 (United States)
- Label: Imperial
- Songwriter(s): Slim Whitman; Lou Wayne

Slim Whitman singles chronology
"Indian Love Call" / "China Doll" (1952)	"An Amateur in Love" / "By the Waters of the Minnetonka" (1952)	"Keep It a Secret" / "My Heart Is Broken in Three" (1952)

"An Amateur in Love"

Single by Slim Whitman
- A-side: "Gone" "An Amateur in Love"
- Released: 1957 (UK)
- Label: London
- Songwriter(s): Slim Whitman; Lou Wayne

Professional ratings
Review scores
Source	Rating
Billboard	positive
Gramophone Record Review	positive

"An Amateur in Love" is a song co-written and originally recorded by Slim Whitman.

== Track listing ==
7-inch single (Imperial 45-8163, 1952, United States)
No.	Title	Writer(s)	Length
1.	"An Amateur in Love"	Slim Whitman; Lou Wayne
2.	"By the Waters of the Minnetonka"	James Mulloy Cavanass; Thurlow Lieurance

7-inch single (London 45-HLP.8420, 1957, UK)
No.	Title	Writer(s)	Length
1.	"Gone"	Smokey Rogers
2.	"An Amateur in Love"	Slim Whitman; Lou Wayne
