= Katy Rose =

American singer-songwriter and producer (born 1987)

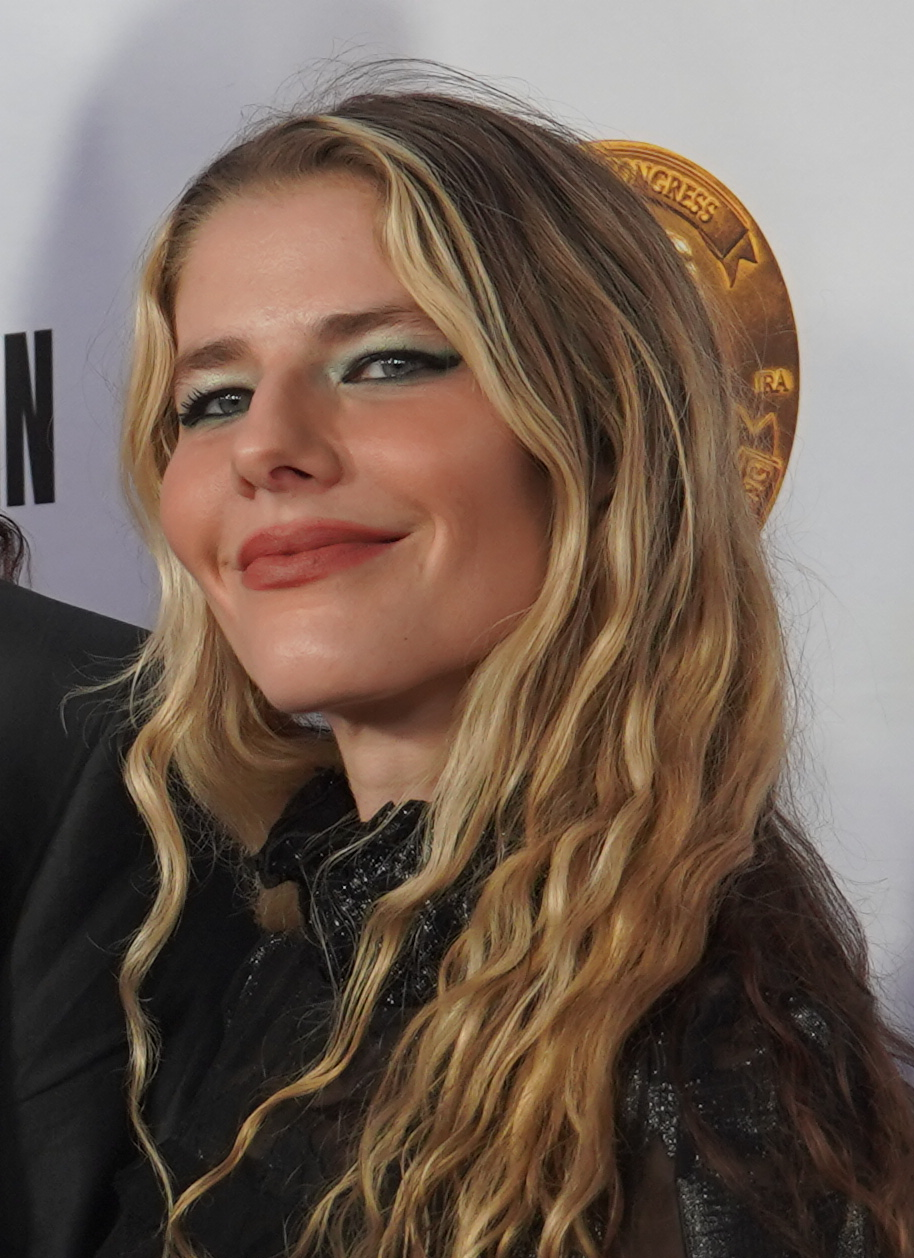
- Rose in 2024
- Born: Kathryn Rosemary Bullard; January 27, 1987 (age 39); Redondo Beach, California, U.S.
- Occupations: Singer-songwriter; producer
- Years active: 2000–present
- Relatives: Kim Bullard (father)
- Musical career
- Genres: Pop; rock; pop rock
- Instruments: Vocals; guitar; piano
- Labels: V2; River Jones
- Website: katyrosemusic.com

Kathryn Rosemary Bullard (born January 27, 1987), known professionally as Katy Rose, is an American singer-songwriter and producer. Rose released two studio albums, Because I Can (V2 Records) and Candy Eyed (River Jones Music). Since her last album, Rose has released eight independent singles.

Rose received recognition for her songs "Overdrive" and "Lemon", which were featured in the films Mean Girls and Thirteen, respectively.

== Early life ==
Rose was born in Los Angeles, California, in 1987 to two musicians: her father is session musician Kim Bullard, and her mother performed backing vocals. Growing up, Rose recalls spending time in the recording studio, meeting Alanis Morissette, Weird Al Yankovic, the Goo Goo Dolls and Tori Amos. Rose began creating musical works of her own at the age of 13, which gained the attention of several record labels. She signed to V2 Records, and released her debut album Because I Can.

== Music career ==
=== 2004–2007: Because I Can and commercial success ===
Rose's debut album, Because I Can, was released on January 27, 2004, on her 17th birthday. The album was preceded by the single "Overdrive", which gained Top 10 airplay in France, Switzerland and South Africa, in addition to becoming a US Adult Top 40 hit. The song was also featured in the 2004 film Mean Girls, in addition to prominently being featured on the film's soundtrack. Other songs on the album were featured in Agent Cody Banks, Dawson's Creek and Grey's Anatomy.

Rose toured for two years with the Cardigans, Liz Phair and the Calling. While touring, she also performed alongside N.E.R.D. and Avril Lavigne. "Overdrive" reached number 1 in Japan's airplay chart, and made MTV's Top 20 video countdown.

=== 2008–present: Candy Eyed and further releases ===
Since Because I Can, Rose has worked as a songwriter in Los Angeles, Stockholm, Paris, Nashville, ATL, NY, and London. Her songs have been featured in The Sims 3 by Electronic Arts, and her most recent collaborations have been with 2Cellos and goth rapper Kobenz. She is currently playing shows with her band in Paris, and released Candy Eyed in 2007 and has since frequently released independent singles starting from 2014.

== Discography ==
=== Albums ===
List of studio albums, with selected chart positions, sales figures and certifications
| Title | Album details | Peak chart positions | | Sales |
| Title | Album details | US Heat. | JPN | Sales |
|---|---|---|---|---|
| Because I Can | Release date: January 17, 2004; Label: V2; Format: CD, digital download | 34 | 40 | JPN: 29,330 |
| Candy Eyed | Release date: June 4, 2007; Label: River Jones Music; Format: Digital download | — | — | |
| Let's Become | Release date: October 21, 2022; Label: Self-released; Format: Digital download, streaming | — | — | |
| Fully Alive | Release date: June 6, 2025; Label: Self-released; Format: Digital download, streaming | — | — | |
"—" denotes an album that did not chart or was not released

=== Singles ===
List of singles, with selected chart positions, showing year released and album name
| Title | Year | Peak chart positions | | | | Album |
| Title | Year | US Adult | AUS | NLD | NZ | Album |
|---|---|---|---|---|---|---|
| "Overdrive" | 2003 | 37 | 94 | 80 | 8 | Because I Can |
| "I Like" | 2004 | — | — | — | — | Because I Can |
| "Underground" | 2015 | — | — | — | — | Non-album singles |
| "Didn't We" | 2016 | — | — | — | — | Non-album singles |
| "Hold on to Me" | 2016 | — | — | — | — | Non-album singles |
| "Tangled but True" | 2016 | — | — | — | — | Non-album singles |
| "Just Like a Woman" | 2017 | — | — | — | — | Non-album singles |
| "Voices Carry" | 2017 | — | — | — | — | Non-album singles |
| "Fireproof" | 2017 | — | — | — | — | Non-album singles |
| "Bleed" | 2017 | — | — | — | — | Non-album singles |
| "Run In a Dream" | 2021 | — | — | — | — | Non-album singles |
| "Don't Give Up on Me" | 2022 | — | — | — | — | Non-album singles |
| "Let's Become" | 2022 | — | — | — | — | Non-album singles |
| "Unbreakable Heart" | 2022 | — | — | — | — | Non-album singles |
| "Be Your Man" | 2022 | — | — | — | — | Non-album singles |
"—" denotes a recording that did not chart or was not released in that territory.

=== Guest appearances ===
List of guest appearances, with other performing artists, showing year released and album name
| Title | Year | Other performer(s) | Album |
|---|---|---|---|
| "Sour Lemon" | 2021 | Kobenz | Non-album single |

=== Other appearances ===
| Title | Year | Album |
|---|---|---|
| "Somebody Got There First" | 2017 | Love Me Not |
