= Cowboys & Englishmen =

Studio album by Poco
- Released: February 1982
- Studio: Soundcastle (Hollywood, California)
- Genre: Country rock
- Length: 33:34
- Label: MCA
- Producer: Mike Flicker

Poco chronology
Blue and Gray (1981)	Cowboys & Englishmen (1982)	Ghost Town (1982)

Cowboys & Englishmen is the fourteenth studio album by the American country rock band Poco. The Young-penned "Feudin'" was nominated for a Grammy in 1982 for Best Country Instrumental Performance. Largely made up of cover songs the album was Poco's last for MCA and reflected the fact that it was a contractual obligation album. When ABC Records was sold to MCA the new label A&R department showed little effort in promoting the band and, as a result, the band fielded offers from other labels once their contract was up and signed with Atlantic Records for their next two albums Ghost Town and Inamorata.

== Reception ==
Professional ratings
Review scores
Source	Rating
AllMusic	1/5 stars
The Encyclopedia of Popular Music	2/5 stars

In his AllMusic review, music critic William Ruhlmann wrote, "A throwaway effort at a time when their career needed rejuvenation, not another wound."

== Track listing ==
1. "Sea of Heartbreak" (Paul Hampton, Hal David) – 3:44
2. "No Relief in Sight" (Rory Bourke, Eugene Dobbins, Johnny Wilson) – 3:10
3. "There Goes My Heart" (Paul Cotton) – 3:11
4. "Ashes" (Rusty Young, John Logan) – 2:59
5. "Feudin’" (Young) – 2:20
6. "Cajun Moon" (J.J. Cale) – 4:00
7. "Ribbon of Darkness" (Gordon Lightfoot) – 3:07
8. "If You Could Read My Mind" (Lynn Duddy & John Edwards) – 3:56
9. "While You're on Your Way" (Tim Hardin) – 3:44
10. "The Price of Love" (Don & Phil Everly) – 3:23

== Personnel ==
- Kim Bullard – keyboards, vocals
- Paul Cotton – guitars, vocals
- Rusty Young – steel guitar, guitars, vocals
- Charlie Harrison – bass, vocals
- Steve Chapman – drums

== Production ==
- Mike Flicker – producer
- John Mills – engineer, mixing
- Dave Marquette – assistant engineer
- Mike Reese – mastering at The Mastering Lab (Hollywood, California).
- George Osaki – art direction
- Bányai István – design, illustration
- Peter Golden – management
- Bill Siddons – management
- Crosslight Management Ltd. – management company
