= Marie-Rose Léodille Delaunay =

Haitian educator (1827–1906)

Marie-Rose Léodille Delaunay also called Mme Belmour-Lepine (1827–1906) was a Haitian educator.

She founded the l'Institution Mont-Carmel in 1850, and was its manager until 1903. This was the first secular secondary educational school for girls in Haiti. It was a pioneer institution as the first secondary educational school for girls in Haiti. President Alexandre Pétion did establish a girls school under the management of Madame Drury in 1816, and Juliette Bussière Laforest-Courtois managed a private school open to girls in 1818–1828, but these had been temporary basic educational schools, and the Haitian government had not even formed any policy around girls education until 1848, after which the first pioneer educational institutions for girls were founded.

== See also ==
- Education in Haiti
