= River Jones =

American drummer

- Origin: Austin, Texas, U.S.
- Genre: Art rock - Indie rock - Alternative
- Years active: 2004–present
- Labels: River Jones Music, BMG
- Website: riverjones.com

River Jones is an American producer, musician, and owner of River Jones Music and Tapestry Sound.

== History ==
Jones began playing and working with music at the age of five. He was heavily into rock music as a youth. Starting at 19, he began a three-year internship at Elektra Records. He also worked at Maverick Records, Grand Royal, and V2 Music, where he held a number of music industry positions.

River recorded a solo album in Austin, Texas, and collaborated with actress Lorelei Linklater.

=== River Jones Music ===
From 2002 until 2005, River was a professional musician drumming for Katy Rose on V2 Records and Nettwerk Management in Los Angeles.

In 2008, Jones began playing in a local riot grrl band, and soon met local musician Courtney Marie Andrews. He teamed up with Andrews to produce her first album, on his new label River Jones Music. The album Urban Myths, which was recorded, printed, and produced by Jones out of an apartment June 2008. Andrews's second full length Painters Hands and a Seventh Son was recorded, produced, and released by Jones exactly one year later. He soon began to sign other acts.

BMG began administering River's solo music in 2018. Jones released his first EP on Austin, Texas label during SXSW 2019.
