= By the Waters of the Minnetonka =

"By the Waters of the Minnetonka" is an American song written in 1915 by James Mulloy Cavanass and Thurlow Lieurance. Many recordings have been made of it over the years and the most popular version was that by Alice Nielsen in 1915.

== Slim Whitman version ==
Slim Whitman recorded this song for Imperial. It was released as a single (with "An Amateur in Love" on the flip side) in 1952.

"By the Waters of the Minnetonka"

Single by Slim Whitman

from the album America's Favorite Folk Artist
- A-side: "An Amateur in Love" "By the Waters of the Minnetonka"
- Released: 1952
- Recorded: 1952
- Genre: Country
- Length: 2:45
- Label: Imperial
- Songwriters: James Mulloy Cavanass; Thurlow Lieurance

Slim Whitman singles chronology
"Indian Love Call" / "China Doll" (1952)	"By the Waters of the Minnetonka" / "An Amateur in Love" (1952)	"Keep It a Secret" / "My Heart Is Broken in Three" (1952)

Professional ratings
Review scores
Source	Rating
Billboard	positive

=== Track listing ===
7-inch single (Imperial 45-8163, 1952, United States)
No.	Title	Writer(s)	Length
1.	"An Amateur in Love"	Slim Whitman; Lou Wayne
2.	"By the Waters of the Minnetonka"	James Mulloy Cavanass; Thurlow Lieurance

== The Marty Gold Orchestra & Chorus version ==
A version by The Marty Gold Orchestra & Chorus was included on their 1959 album By the Waters of the Minnetonka (Kapp KL 1125).
