= Legacy (Poco album) =

Studio album by Poco
- Released: August 29, 1989
- Studios: Capitol (Hollywood); Ocean Way (Hollywood); Studio 55, (Los Angeles); Lion Share (Los Angeles)
- Genre: Country rock
- Length: 43:22
- Label: RCA
- Producer: David Cole (except “Nothin’ to Hide” by Richard Marx)

Poco chronology
Inamorata (1984)	Legacy (1989)	Running Horse (2002)

Legacy is a studio album by the American country rock band Poco, released in 1989. The album reunited the five original members of the group. It contained two top-40 singles, "Call It Love" and "Nothin' to Hide".

Legacy was the second Poco album to be certified gold.

== Critical reception ==
Professional ratings
Review scores
Source	Rating
AllMusic	3/5 stars
The Encyclopedia of Popular Music	4/5 stars
The Rolling Stone Album Guide	1/5 stars

The Vancouver Sun wrote that the album "eschews the simple beauty of [Richie] Furay's work with the Springfield for the slick, sappy MOR sound of '70s California country rock."

== Track listing ==
=== Original vinyl LP ===
1. "When It All Began" (Steve Pasch, Anthony "M." Krizan, Richie Furay, Scott Sellen) – 3:36
2. "Call It Love" (Ron Gilbeau, Billy Crain, Rick Lonow, Jim Messina) – 4:17
3. "The Nature of Love" (Jeff Silbar, Van Stephenson) – 4:03
4. "What Do People Know" (Rusty Young) – 3:52
5. "Follow Your Dreams" (Messina) – 2:56
6. "Rough Edges" (Young, Radney Foster, Bill Lloyd) – 3:08
7. "Nothin’ to Hide" (Richard Marx, Bruce Gaitsch) – 5:12
8. "Who Else" (Young, Mike Noble) – 4:01
9. "Lovin' You Every Minute" (Messina, Michael Brady) – 3:10
10. "If It Wasn’t for You" (Furay, Scott Sellen) – 4:16

=== CD version ===
1. "When It All Began" (Steve Pasch, Anthony "M." Krizan, Richie Furay, Scott Sellen) – 3:36
2. "Call It Love" (Ron Gilbeau, Billy Crain, Rick Lonow) – 4:17
3. "The Nature of Love" (Jeff Silbar, Van Stephenson) – 4:03
4. "What Do People Know" (Rusty Young) – 3:52
5. "Nothin’ to Hide" (Richard Marx, Bruce Gaitsch) – 5:12
6. "Look Within" (Messina) – 5:03
7. "Rough Edges" (Young, Radney Foster, Bill Lloyd) – 3:08
8. "Who Else" (Young, Mike Noble) – 4:01
9. "Lovin’ You Every Minute" (Messina, Michael Brady) – 3:10
10. "If It Wasn’t for You" (Furay, Scott Sellen) – 4:16
11. "Follow Your Dreams" (Messina) – 2:56

== Personnel ==
Poco

- Jim Messina – guitars, vocals, lead vocals on "Follow Your Dreams," "Lovin' You Every Minute," and "Look Within"
- Richie Furay – guitars, 12-string guitar, vocals, lead vocals on "When It All Began" and "If It Wasn't for You"
- Rusty Young – steel guitar, banjo, dobro, guitars, acoustic piano, vocals, lead vocals on "Call It Love," "What Do People Know," and "Who Else"
- Randy Meisner – bass, vocals, lead vocals on "The Nature of Love," "Rough Edges," and "Nothin' to Hide"
- George Grantham – drums (not on the album), backing vocals

Additional musicians

- Brian Mendelsohn – Synclavier programming
- Bill Payne – keyboards
- C.J. Vanston – keyboards
- Frank Marocco – accordion
- Bruce Gaitsch – acoustic guitar, arrangements on "Nothin' to Hide"
- Russ Powell – guitar
- Joe Chemay – bass
- Leland Sklar – bass
- Gary Mallaber – drums
- Jeff Porcaro – drums
- Paulinho da Costa – percussion
- Richard Marx – vocals, arrangements on "Nothin' to Hide"

Production

- David Cole – producer (1–4, 6–11), engineer (1–4, 6–11), mixing (1–4, 6–11)
- Richard Marx – producer (5)
- Rick Holbrook – engineering (5), mixing (5) at Capitol Studios (Hollywood California)
- Peter Doell – additional engineer, assistant engineer
- Ken Felton – assistant engineer
- Steve Holroyd – assistant engineer
- Jesse Kanner – assistant engineer
- Laura Livingston – mix assistant
- Wally Traugott – mastering at Capitol Studios (Hollywood, California).
- John Ciasulli – technical assistance
- Ross Garfield – technical assistance
- Suzanne Marie Edgren – production coordinator
- DNZ, The Design Group – art direction, design
- Jim Shea – photography
- Lendon Flanagan – illustration

== Certifications ==
Region	Certification	Certified units/sales
United States (RIAA)	Gold	500,000^{^}
^{^} Shipments figures based on certification alone.
