= China Doll (Slim Whitman song) =

Single by Slim Whitman
- A-side: "Indian Love Call"
- Released: 1952
- Length: 2:32
- Label: Imperial
- Songwriter(s): Gerald Cannan; Kenny Cannan

Slim Whitman singles chronology
"Cold Empty Arms" / "In a Hundred Years or More" (1952)	"China Doll" / "Indian Love Call" (1952)	"An Amateur in Love" / "By the Waters of the Minnetonka" (1952)

Audio
- "China Doll" on YouTube

Professional ratings
Review scores
Source	Rating
Billboard	positive

"China Doll" is a song written by Gerald Cannan and Kenny Cannan and originally recorded and released as a single (Imperial 8156, with "Indian Love Call" on the opposite side) by Slim Whitman.

== Track listing ==
7-inch single (Imperial 45-8156, 1952, United States)
No.	Title	Writer(s)	Length
1.	"Indian Love Call"	Otto Harbach; Oscar Hammerstein II; Rudolf Friml	2:30
2.	"China Doll"	Gerald Cannan; Kenny Cannan	2:32

7-inch single (London Records 45-HL 1149, November 1952, reissued in 1955, UK)
No.	Title	Writer(s)	Length
1.	"Indian Love Call" (from Rose Marie)	Rudolf Friml; Otto Harbach; Oscar Hammerstein II	2:30
2.	"China Doll"	Gerald and Kenny Cannan	2:32

== Charts ==
Chart (1955)	Peak position
UK Singles (OCC)	15
