= Shoot for the Moon (song) =

Single by Poco

from the album Ghost Town
- B-side: "The Midnight Rodeo (In the Lead Tonight)"
- Released: December 1982
- Recorded: 2:44
- Genre: Pop
- Label: Atlantic
- Songwriter: Rusty Young
- Producer: John Mills

Poco singles chronology
"Midnight Rain" (1980)	"Shoot for the Moon" (1982)	"Days Gone By" (1984)

"Shoot for the Moon" is a 1982 song by Poco, written by Rusty Young. It was the second of three singles released from their Ghost Town LP, and the bigger hit of the two which reached the charts.

The song reached #50 on the U.S. Billboard Hot 100 and #44 on Cash Box during the late winter of 1983. It also peaked at #10 on the Adult Contemporary chart. Unlike most of their other hits, the song did not chart in Canada.

Billboard highlighted the song's "dreary optimism" and "four–part harmonies."

== Chart history ==
Chart (1982–83)	Peak position
US Billboard Hot 100	50
US Billboard Adult Contemporary	10
US Cash Box Top 100	44
