= Thurlow Lieurance =

American songwriter

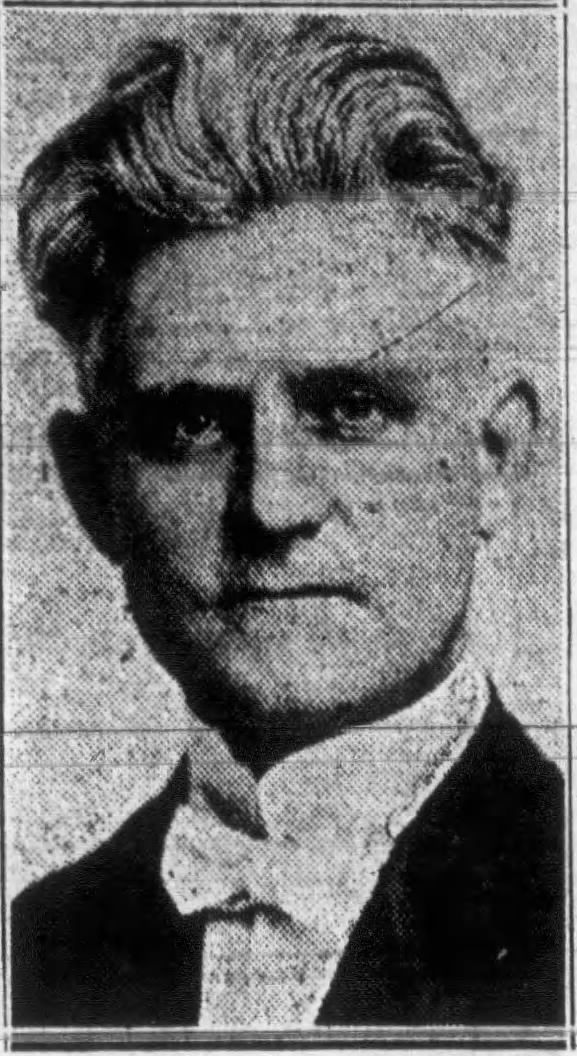
Lieurance in 1925

Thurlow Weed Lieurance (March 21, 1878 – October 9, 1963) was an American composer, known primarily for his song "By the Waters of Minnetonka". He is frequently categorized with a number of his contemporaries, including Charles Wakefield Cadman, Arthur Nevin, Charles Sanford Skilton, Preston Ware Orem, and Arthur Farwell, as a member of the Indianist movement in American music.

"By the Waters of Minnetonka"
Ernestine Schumann-Heink (1926)

== Life ==
Lieurance was born in Oskaloosa, Iowa, but his family relocated to Kansas when he was very young. Little is recorded about his early education; it is known that his father encouraged him to be a pharmacist, but that he preferred instead to follow a career in music. Upon the outbreak of the Spanish–American War he enlisted as a musician. With the cessation of hostilities, he moved to Ohio and enrolled in the College of Music of Cincinnati, studying there until his savings from military service ran out. He was able to continue studying with Herman Bellstedt, a cornetist and bandmaster under John Philip Sousa. During his time at the Cincinnati College of Music, he studied theory, orchestration, harmony and arranging. In 1900 he sang with the chorus of Castle Square Garden Opera Company to learn of opera and its production. Around 1905, Lieurance joined the Chautauqua Society, working in traveling tent schools teaching music to American Indians. The contacts he made through this position led to an interest in Indian culture; he began to try to transcribe the songs that he heard, and began to teach himself the craft of making traditional Native American flutes. At about this time polio left Lieurance disabled; though he had very little use of his legs he was quite vigorous and mobile.

Around 1909, Lieurance acquired a portable cylinder recording device from Edison Records, and carried it with him whenever he went to visit Indian performers. In October 1911 he recorded a Crow (Apsalooke) (maybe Oglala Lakota Sioux) singer, Sitting Eagle, also known as Mortimer Dreamer, then living on the Crow Reservation in Montana. From this recording he took the melody for his song "By the Waters of the Minnetonka". He set it to a harp-like accompaniment, and it was published by Theodore Presser in 1913 as "an Indian love song" with words by J. M. Cavanass, becoming an instant success and going through several editions; it was also frequently recorded in the years before 1950.

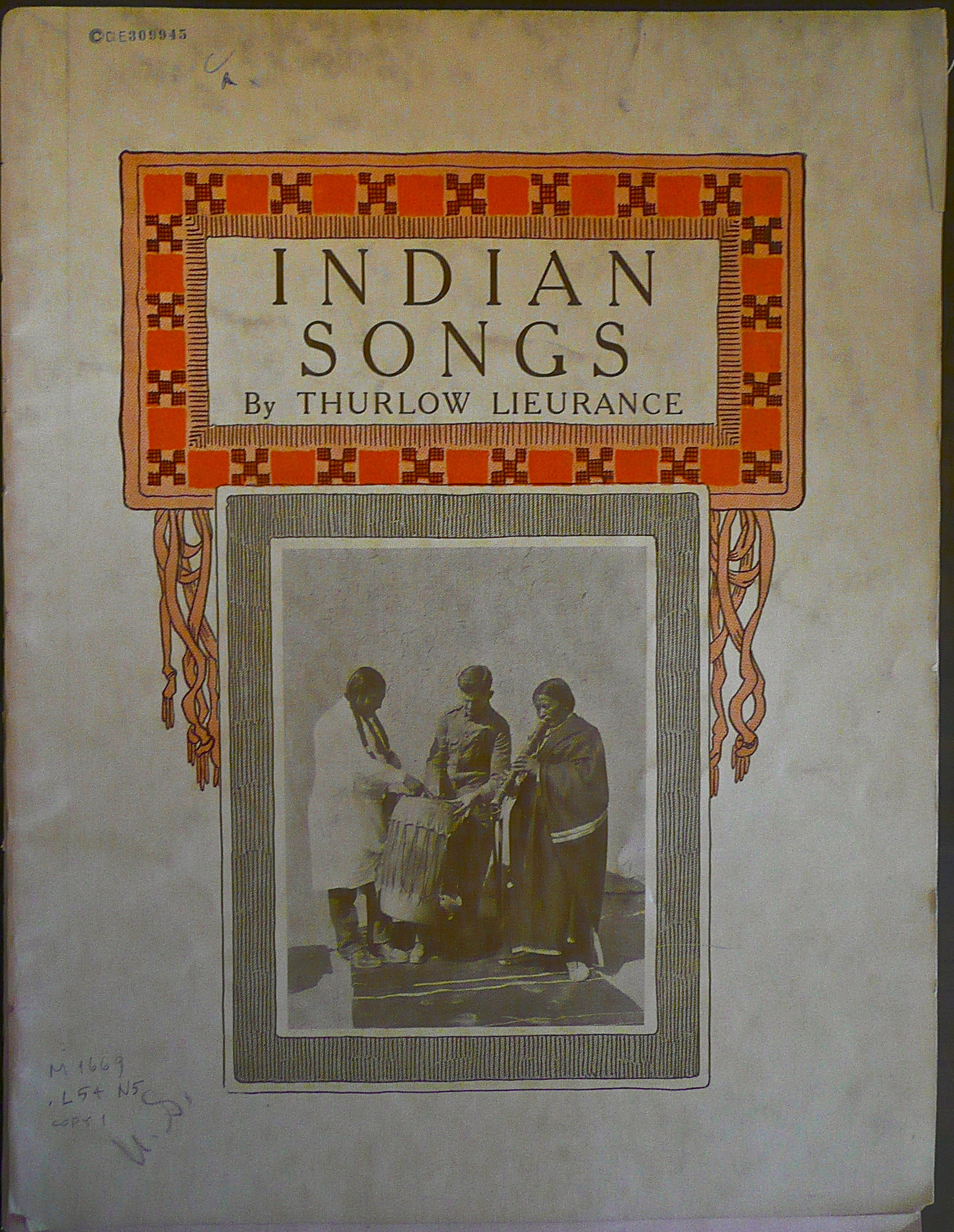
Indian Songs by Thurlow Lieurance

The early editions of the published arrangements in 1915, 1917, and 1921 called for a violin or flute to echo the vocal melody, playing either a provided melody or ad lib. Possibly because of this, the melody is often played on the Native American flute. The performance notes from Lieurance's 1921 edition suggest:

A violin typifies the wind, if you choose, echoes the soft harmonies of the accompaniment which rocks to and fro on harp chords, between the major key and its relative minor, in and out of that singular domain musicians know as the “added Sixth” chord and its derivatives.

A typewritten note found among the composer's papers describes the legend behind the song:

Moon Deer, daughter of the Moon Clan, loved Sun Deer of the Sun Clan. Tribal law forbade marriage between the two clans. It was decreed that daughters of the Moon Clan must marry into the Eagle Clan. The two lovers, in tears, ran away far to the east and north. They came to a beautiful lake called Minnetonka (Minne means water; Tonka means large and round). Their happiness was disturbed because their traditional enemies, the Chippewa, lived on the north shore of this lake. They feared to return home and be separated, and finally in desperation they decided to end it all. The legend states that they disappeared beneath the waves and were no more. The waves moaned a rhythmic sound and the pines crooned their love song. Many moons afterwards the warriors of the Sioux drove the Chippewa north to Lake Superior. One night while they were camped on the shores of Lake Minnetonka, they heard the waters singing a weird melody and, in the moon-path on the waters, two lilies appeared and grew to the skies. The lilies were the spirits of Moon Deer and Sun Deer.

Lieurance himself recognized how important to his career the song had been, later saying:

That night marked an epoch in my life, opened to me a new world. What work I have since done has been due chiefly to that song. Thousands of people have heard it, clothed with the harmonizing which our ears demand; it is lying upon music Tables all over the land, has been sung by many of the world's famous singers, including Schuman-Heink, Julia Culp and Alice Nielson.

Lieurance married, in 1917, Edna Woolley, and she took part in his recital tours thereafter. She would wear an Indian costume and play the part of "Princess Watahwaso". Such was the success of these recitals that Lieurance was able to return to school in Cincinnati, finally gaining his degree there in 1924. The couple retired from concertizing in 1926 and settled into teaching positions, working briefly at the University of Nebraska before coming to the University of Wichita. Lieurance eventually became the school's Dean of Fine Arts. The couple retired from the university in 1945.

Lieurance and his wife were invited by Theodore Presser to travel to Europe in the early 1930s. Upon their return, the composer was given support for his research into Native American music when he received a grant from the Scientific Research Society of America. Later in the decade, he helped to found the Minisa Symphony Orchestra in Wichita; most of his orchestral music was written for this group. Upon retirement, Lieurance and his wife moved to Neosho Falls, Kansas. Their house there was destroyed by flood in 1952, and the couple moved to Boulder, Colorado, where Lieurance died in 1963. Today the couple's papers may be found in the music library of Wichita State University, which has been named for the composer. Much of Lieurance's research collection is housed in the Smithsonian Institution.

== Music ==
Apart from "By the Waters of Minnetonka", Lieurance wrote over 300 works, his first composition was entitled "A Prayer". Included in his works were a number of orchestral pieces, with titles such as Trails Southwest, The Conquistadors, and Sad Moon on Falling Leaf. Much of the rest of his output consisted of songs and works for choir, but he also composed an opera, The Drama of Yellowstone.
