= Rick Monroe =

American singer-songwriter

- Born: Clearwater, Florida
- Genres: Country music
- Occupations: Singer; Songwriter
- Labels: Divorce Records; Thermal Entertainment
- Website: www.rickmonroe.com

Rick Monroe is an American country singer who lives in Nashville, Tennessee.

== Life and careers ==
Rick Monroe was born in Clearwater, Florida. He grew up in California, Connecticut, Kansas, North Carolina, and England. He started playing the drums at age nine and has since stuck to singing.

Monroe started working in the coffeehouse circuits, but then formed his own band and developed a tour schedule of over 100 dates a year. In 1996, Monroe established his own record label, Divorce Records, under which he would later release all his four albums. In 1999, when he was based in Los Angeles, Monroe recorded his album Shame at CAM studios in Bulverde, Texas.

Calling him a "musician's musician", Billboard commented that his "warm, supple" voice brought "an edgy energy" to his 2005 cover of the song "Midnight Rider." In 2007, Monroe moved to Nashville. His "Crazy Not To" single, released in the summer of 2012, reached top-40 radio and chart status.

It’s A Love Thing, his EP from 2014, included the song "Fires Out", which debuted at #52 of Billboard's Country Indicator, and was a Top 40 Music Row hit, and "Great Minds Drink Alike," which debuted at #58 and has remained his most popular song on YouTube with a video featuring fan footage.

In 2017, Monroe toured the country promoting his new work. He released his six track EP Gypsy Soul on May 12, 2017. The first single was "This Side of You", which made the Music Row Country Breakout Chart. Monroe was one of the few independent artists given a spot on a sanctioned CMA stage during the 2017 CMA Music Festival.

Monroe has performed in 17 countries, and every U.S. state except for Oregon. He played with artists such as Lee Brice, Aaron Lewis, Eric Church, Charlie Daniels, Dwight Yoakam, Montgomery Gentry, Patty Loveless, Trick Pony, Emerson Drive, Pat Green, Randy Houser, and Josh Thompson. In 2016 alone, he traveled over 100,000 miles and played over 120 shows. He was the Brand Ambassador at seven consecutive Jägermeister Country Tours.

Monroe writes most of his own songs. He has been described as playing "fast and loose country music about cars and beers, tinged with a big rock 'n' roll sound" and singing with a "memorable blues-infused vocal."

== Personal life ==
He is active in humanitarian causes such as Safe Haven Family Shelter, the Frank Foundation, St. Jude Children's Research Hospital, and the Children's Miracle Network.

== Discography ==
Rick Monroe released five studio albums, one live album, two EPs, and several singles. He has also composed for other singers.

=== Albums ===
Year	Title	Label
1997	Legend's Diner	Divorce Records
1999	Shame	Divorce Records
2005	Against the Grain	Divorce Records
2012	Crazy Not To	Divorce Records

Year	Title	Label
2018	Smoke Out The Window	Thermal Records

Year	Title	Label
2024	Six Gun Soul	TLG/Virgin Music Group

=== Singles ===
Year	Title	Album/EP
1997	Day by Day	Legend's Diner
1997	"Rainy Day"	Legend's Diner
2005	"Midnight Rider"	Against the Grain
2008	"Honky Tonk Road Trip (Radio Edit)"	Get Loud Get Lit
2010	"Get Ur Country On"	
2012	"Part One"	Crazy Not To
2013	"Just the Same"	
2014	"Fires Out"	It's a Love Thing
2014	"Small Town"	It's a Love Thing
2016	"Here's To Us"	
2017	"This Side of You"	Gypsy Soul
2022	"World's Gone Crazy"	Six Gun Soul
2022	"Common Ground (feat. B. Stille)"	Single
2022	"Best of You"	Single
2022	"Beer Shape"	Single
2024	"Unbridled"	Southern Tea Bags
2024	"Worth The Hurt	Single
2024	"Wounds (feat. Billy Morrison)	Southern Tea Bags

=== Extended plays ===
Year	Title	Label
1997	Life Goes On in L.A.	Divorce Records
2014	It's a Love Thing	MRG Records
2017	Gypsy Soul	MRG Records

=== Composer ===
Year	Song	Artist
2002	Stars of Texas	Winsor Harmon
2012	Here We Go Again	Emily Randolph
2013	A Moment Like This	Gary Ray
2016	New Country Rock Box	Petruta Kupper

=== Music videos ===
Year	Video
2005	Midnight Rider
2014	Just The Same
2014	Fires Out
2005	Midnight Rider
2022	Best Of You
2022	World's Gone Crazy
2023	Devil On Both Sides
2024	Worth The Hurt
2024	Unbridled - Live
2025	Beer Shape
