= Maryrose Reeves Allen =

American physical educator 1899–1992

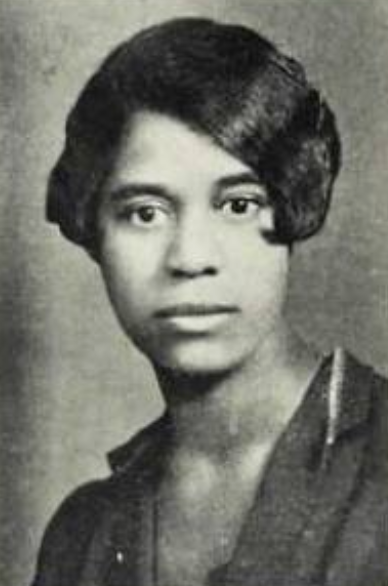
- Maryrose Reeves Allen, from the 1927 yearbook of Howard University
- Born: November 5, 1899; Louisville, Kentucky, U.S.
- Died: January 14, 1992 (aged 92); Washington, D.C., U.S.
- Occupations: Professor, college administrator

Maryrose Reeves Allen (November 5, 1899 – January 14, 1992) was an American college professor and administrator. She was a physical education professor at Howard University from 1925 to 1967, and founded the Negro Women's Intercollegiate Athletic Association, to encourage and elevate women's sports at historically Black colleges and universities (HBCUs).

== Early life and education ==
Maryrose Reeves was born in Louisville, Kentucky, and raised in Indiana, the daughter of Mary Saunders Reeves and stepdaughter of Frank Walden. She completed diploma requirements at the Sargent School of Physical Education in 1923, and earned a bachelor's degree there in 1933; she earned a master's degree from Boston University in 1938, with a thesis titled "“The Development of Beauty in College Women Through Health and Physical Education”.

== Career ==
Allen taught in public schools in New Jersey and at Hampton University in Virginia as a young woman. Beginning in 1925, she was the first director of the Physical Education for Women department at Howard University. Her approach to physical education promoted a broad sense of student wellness, including concern for body image, self-care, sexuality, and spirituality. "At no time have I doubted the beauty of Howard women," she said, and "a woman that is beautiful physically, mentally and spiritually is an asset to her race and her country." She encouraged every woman student at Howard to learn a sport, keep a journal, and develop a skin care regimen. She organized dances, field days, and holiday events to keep students physically and culturally engaged. She became a member of Alpha Kappa Alpha sorority in 1923.

Allen also founded the Howard University Dance Ensemble, directed the Howard University Modern Dance Group, and worked with choreographer Charles Weidman. She founded the Negro Women's Intercollegiate Athletic Association. She discouraged women's participation in "heavier sports" such as basketball, because "they rob her of her feminine charms and often of her good health". In 1929 she reported a female student for kissing a male student in front of the campus gymnasium; the female student was suspended and sent home to Indiana for the offense, causing a student revolt. She retired from Howard in 1967.

== Personal life ==
Maryrose Reeves married physician Elijah Henry Allen Jr., director of the Howard University Health Service, around 1928; they divorced in 1943. Allen died in Washington, D.C., in 1992, at the age of 92. Her papers are held in the Moorland-Spingarn Research Center at Howard University.
