= Call It Love (Poco song) =

1989 single by Poco

Single by Poco

from the album Legacy
- Released: August 1989
- Genre: Country rock; pop rock
- Length: 4:17
- Label: RCA
- Songwriters: Ronnie Gilbeau; Billy Crain; Rick Lonow; Jim Messina (Note: Messina is credited as a co-writer in some contemporary and album credits, while some later sources credit only Gilbeau, Crain and Lonow.)
- Producer: David Cole

Poco singles chronology
"When It All Began" (1989)	"Call It Love" (1989)	"Nothin' to Hide" (1989)

Music video
- "Call It Love" on YouTube

"Call It Love" is a song by American country rock band Poco. It was released in 1989 as the first single from the band's album Legacy on RCA Records. The song features Rusty Young on lead vocals and was produced by David Cole.

The single became one of Poco's most successful recordings, reaching number 18 on the US Billboard Hot 100, number 2 on the Adult Contemporary chart and number 3 on the Mainstream Rock chart. It was released during the promotion of Legacy, which reunited Poco's five original members: Richie Furay, George Grantham, Jim Messina, Randy Meisner and Rusty Young.

== Background and composition ==
"Call It Love" was recorded for Legacy, Poco's 1989 reunion album. The album reunited Furay, Grantham, Messina, Meisner and Young, who had formed the band's original lineup in the late 1960s. The song was written by Ronnie Gilbeau (Palomino Road's member), Billy Crain and Rick Lonow (Poco's former member). Some contemporary and album credits additionally list Messina as a co-writer, while later sources, including AllMusic, credit only Gilbeau, Crain and Lonow.

Gilbeau was the son of Gib Guilbeau, a musician who was associated with the Flying Burrito Brothers. Young had also been invited to join the Flying Burrito Brothers but instead chose to form Poco. Young later recalled that an early version of "Call It Love" contained lyrics that Furay, who had become a Christian minister, was uncomfortable with. According to Young, the members resolved the disagreement by replacing the verse with another version that everyone accepted.

"Call It Love" is a contemporary pop-oriented country-rock song. Young sings the lead vocal, while the recording combines Poco's country-rock instrumentation with the polished production associated with late-1980s pop and rock recordings. The song was produced by David Cole during the recording sessions for Legacy.

== Release ==
"Call It Love" was issued as the first single from Legacy in 1989. Contemporary trade coverage reported that the song was rapidly gaining airplay on pop, album-rock and adult-contemporary radio stations.

The song peaked at number 18 on the US Billboard Hot 100. It also reached number 2 on the US Adult Contemporary chart and number 3 on the US Mainstream Rock chart. In international markets, "Call It Love" reached number 20 in the Netherlands and number 38 in Belgium. The song helped return Poco to the singles charts following a period without a new studio album. Martin C. Strong's The Great Rock Discography identifies "Call It Love" as a Top 20 hit from Legacy.

== Music video and promotion ==
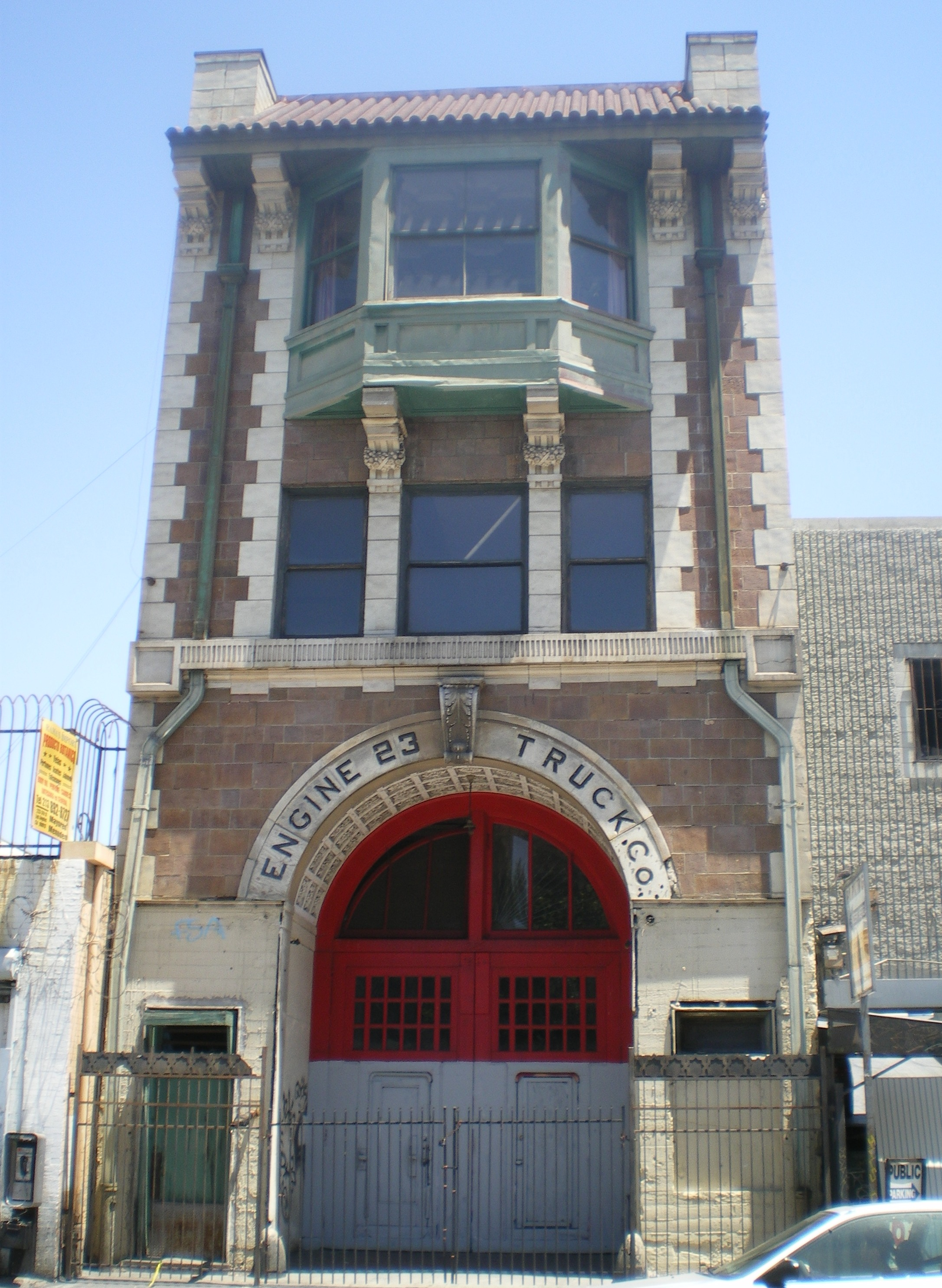
The former Fire Station No. 23 in Los Angeles, where performance footage for the "Call It Love" music video was filmed.

The music video for "Call It Love" was directed by Michael Bay. RCA Records hired Bay to direct the video, which combines footage of Poco performing the song with a separate narrative sequence. The performance footage was filmed at the former Fire Station 23 in Los Angeles.

Poco promoted "Call It Love" through a number of television appearances during the Legacy campaign. The band performed the song on The Arsenio Hall Show on October 4, 1989, and on The Tonight Show Starring Johnny Carson on November 17, 1989. On October 24, 1989, Poco appeared on the Dutch television program Countdown, where the group lip-synced "Call It Love". Photographer Peter van Leeuwen photographed the band in the television studio before the filming.

== Critical reception ==
AllMusic gave Legacy a mixed review but singled out "Call It Love" among the album's notable songs. A later assessment of the album described the song as "one that would belong on a Poco best-of collection". Contemporary coverage also highlighted the song's radio performance. The Gavin Report reported that "Call It Love" was receiving increased airplay across several formats during the album's release period.

A later review of the 2023 reissue of Legacy by Americana Highways noted the recording's use of the original Poco lineup and described "Call It Love" as "enduring appeal".

== Track listing ==
7-inch single
No.	Title	Length
1.	"Call It Love"	4:17
2.	"Lovin' You Every Minute"	3:10

== Personnel ==
Credits are adapted from the personnel credits for Apple Music.

Poco

- Rusty Young – lead vocals, guitars
- Jim Messina – guitars, vocals
- Richie Furay – guitars, vocals
- Randy Meisner – bass, vocals
- George Grantham – drums, backing vocals

Additional musicians

- Billy Crain – composer, arranger
- Ronnie Guilbeau – composer, arranger
- Rick Lonow – arranger

Production

- David Cole – producer, engineer, mixing

== Charts ==
=== Weekly charts ===
Chart performance for "Call It Love"
Chart (1989)	Peak position
US Billboard Hot 100	18
US Adult Contemporary	2
US Mainstream Rock	3
Cash Box Top 100	23
Music Week US Top Forties	32

=== Year-end charts ===
Year-end chart performance for "Call It Love"
Chart (1989)	Position
US Billboard Year-End Hot 100	25
