= Rose Marie (disambiguation) =

Rose Marie (1923–2017) was an American actress.

Rose Marie or Rose-Marie may also refer to:

- Rose-Marie, an operetta by Rudolph Friml
  - Rose-Marie (1928 film), a silent film starring Joan Crawford
  - Rose Marie (1936 film), a black-and-white musical starring Jeanette MacDonald and Nelson Eddy
  - Rose Marie (1954 film), a color musical starring Ann Blyth, Howard Keel and Fernando Lamas
    - "Rose Marie" (song), the title song, which became a hit in 1955 for Slim Whitman
  - Rose-Marie (1958 cast recording)
- Rose-Marie (singer) (1956–2024), Northern Irish singer
- Rose-Marie Carlsson (born 1954), Swedish politician
- Dr Rose Marie, a character in A Very Peculiar Practice

== See also ==
- Rosemary (disambiguation)
- Marie Rose (disambiguation)
