= River Jones Music =

Independent record label

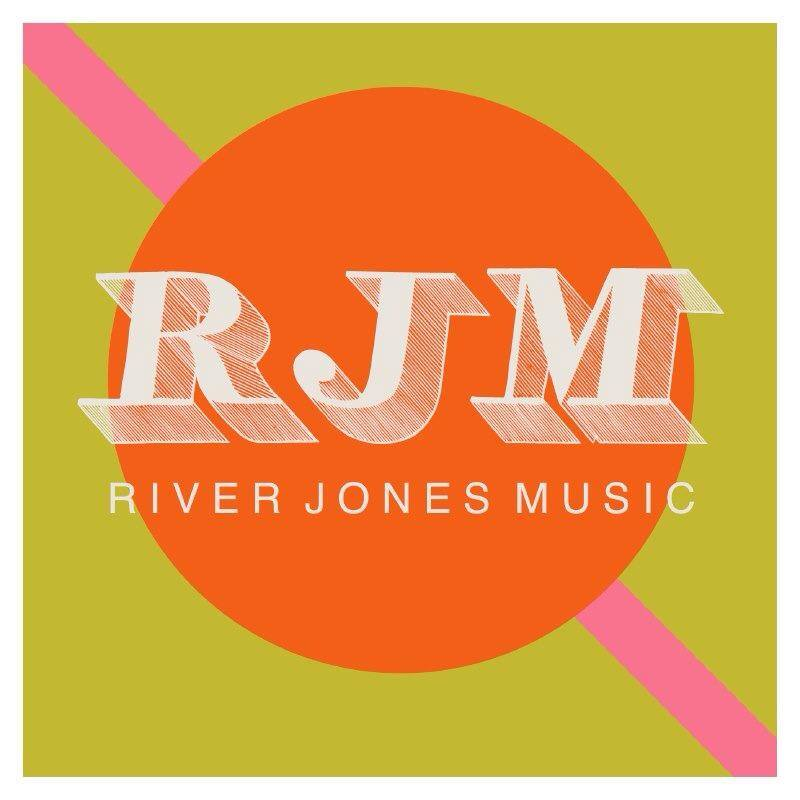
- Founded: 2007
- Founder: River Jones
- Genre: Rock
- Country of origin: U.S.
- Location: Los Angeles, California

River Jones Music is an independent record label founded in Los Angeles, California, in 2007 by River Jones. The label has been home to many developing artists in the western states of America. The regional start with the collective has been compared to previous label upstarts such as Sub Pop, Saddle Creek, and Merge Records.

== History ==
The first full-length release was set to be an album by Katy Rose (a collection of song demos done with Beck's musical director Greg Kurstin) and Justin Meldal-Johnsen of Beck, Air (French band), and Nine Inch Nails. In late 2007, River Jones and Katy Rose parted ways. River Jones set out to find artists to produce.

The first Courtney Marie Andrews albums "Urban Myths" and "Painters Hands and a Seventh Son" were followed by Michelle Blades' (Niece of Rubén Blades) first full-length album Oh, Nostalgia! and Owl and Penny's first LP Fever Dreams in 2009. In 2010, Steff and the Articles signed a development deal with River Jones Music. Steff and The Articles submitted their self-made self-titled album. Also in 2010, Courtney Marie Andrews' third album titled For One I Knew was produced by Jones and Andrews. Ethan McCracken recorded and mixed part of the album in Seattle, WA. It was mastered by Roger Seibel (of Elliott Smith, Bikini Kill, and Death Cab for Cutie fame), through SAE mastering in Arizona. Andrews was asked to sing on the Jimmy Eat World album Invented and joined the band for a world tour. Courtney Andrews The Buffalo & The Bird was listed as one of the 100 songs that define Arizona.

In 2011, RJM signed its first international artist; Christine Owman from Sweden who released a duet with Mark Lanegan as a single to her debut album. River Jones started focusing his attention on getting Arizona bands known regionally. Jones worked closely with Steff and The Articles and You Me and Apollo as they released new albums on the label. Michelle Blades released her third album, Mariana, recorded by River Jones. The label helped local songwriter Dylan Pratt get Arizona shows while Dylan Pratt released his debut album Lifters & Leaners on RJM.

In 2012, River Jones started a weekly radio show National Local. The radio show aired every week on KUKQ and featured up and coming music from the burgeoning Western United States music scene with music from Courtney Barnett, Sharon Van Etten, Elle King, Angel Olsen, Lady Lamb The Beekeeper, and many more.

In 2013, the label started an expansion of the entire west coast while connecting bands and signing more active and touring bands to the roster.

River Jones produced a solo album with Stuart Sullivan that premiered at SXSW 2017. He also collaborated with actress Lorelei Linklater.

The label released music from Little Tornados with Caroline Says (Caroline Sallee) on vocals. The backing musicians were in notable acts such as Laetitia Sadier, Stereolab, and Tortoise. The single "I Disappear" was well received and compared to Broadcast and Deerhunter.

BMG began administering River's solo music in 2018.

RJM signed The Elidas and is in production for an album in 2024.

== Roster ==
- The Elidas (current)
- Courtney Marie Andrews (2008–2010)
- Michelle Blades (2009–2012)
- Kemp & Eden (2009–2010)
- Brent Cowles (2009–2012)
