= Thirteen (2003 film) =

2003 film by Catherine Hardwicke

- U.S. theatrical release poster
- Directed by: Catherine Hardwicke
- Written by: Catherine Hardwicke; Nikki Reed
- Produced by: Jeff Levy-Hinte; Michael London
- Starring: Holly Hunter; Evan Rachel Wood; Nikki Reed; Jeremy Sisto; Deborah Kara Unger; Kip Pardue; Sarah Clarke; D. W. Moffett; Vanessa Anne Hudgens; Jenicka Carey
- Cinematography: Elliot Davis
- Edited by: Nancy Richardson
- Music by: Mark Mothersbaugh
- Production companies: Working Title Films; Antidote Films
- Distributed by: Fox Searchlight Pictures (worldwide); Universal Pictures (United Kingdom and Ireland, via United International Pictures) (Note: Despite the film’s UK marketing having Universal replacing Fox Searchlight’s logo and name in the film’s billing block, the Fox Searchlight logo is retained on the film itself on the VHS and DVD release from Universal Studios Home Entertainment)
- Release dates: January 17, 2003 (Sundance); August 20, 2003 (New York City); August 22, 2003 (Los Angeles); December 5, 2003 (United Kingdom)
- Running time: 100 minutes
- Countries: United States; United Kingdom
- Language: English
- Budget: $2 million
- Box office: $10.1 million

Thirteen is a 2003 psychological coming-of-age teen drama film directed by Catherine Hardwicke, written by Hardwicke and Nikki Reed and starring Holly Hunter, Evan Rachel Wood and Reed with Jeremy Sisto, Brady Corbet, Deborah Kara Unger, Kip Pardue, Sarah Clarke, D. W. Moffett, Vanessa Hudgens (in her film acting debut), and Jenicka Carey in supporting roles. Loosely based on Nikki Reed's life at ages 13 to 14, the film's plot follows Tracy, a middle school student in Los Angeles, who begins dabbling in substance abuse, sex, and crime after becoming friends with the school's popular girl, Evie.

The screenplay for Thirteen was written over six days by Hardwicke and the then-14-year-old Reed; Hardwicke, a former production designer, marking her directorial debut, independently raised funds herself for the production.

Upon the film's debut at the Sundance Film Festival in January 2003, Hardwicke won the Sundance Directing (Drama) for the film. Fox Searchlight Pictures subsequently acquired Thirteen for distribution, giving the film a limited release in the United States beginning on August 20, 2003; the release would expand in September 2003 and the film went on to gross a total of $4.6 million at the U.S. box office.

Though it received numerous favorable reviews from critics, Thirteen generated some controversy for its depiction of youth drug use (including inhalants, marijuana, LSD and alcohol), underage sexual behavior, and self-harm. The film earned Hunter an Academy Award nomination for Best Supporting Actress and Golden Globe nominations for Hunter and Wood for Best Supporting Actress and Best Actress in a Drama, respectively.

== Plot ==
13-year-old Tracy Freeland begins the seventh grade as a smart, mild-mannered honors student at a middle school in Los Angeles. Her divorced mother Melanie is a recovering alcoholic who struggles to support Tracy and her older brother Mason by working as a hairdresser. Melanie is too busy and occupied with her fellow ex-addict boyfriend Brady to notice Tracy's increasing depression.

On the first day of school, Tracy encounters classmate Evie Zamora, who is considered the most stylish and popular girl in school. After being teased by Evie's clique for her "Cabbage Patch" clothes, Tracy is mortified and decides to shed her "little girl" image. At a store owned by Melanie's friend, Tracy happily finds trendier clothes as Melanie offers a few dollars in change as payment.

Tracy wears one of her new outfits to school and catches Evie's attention. Evie invites Tracy to go shopping on Melrose Avenue in Hollywood but gives her a fake phone number to prank her. Nevertheless, Tracy determinedly shows up on Melrose Avenue and meets with Evie and her friend Astrid. Tracy is uncomfortable with the two shoplifting and excuses herself to sit outside the store on a bench. When a distracted woman sits next to Tracy, she steals the woman's wallet, which impresses Evie and Astrid. The three go on a shopping spree with the stolen money, and Tracy and Evie quickly become friends.

Evie introduces an intrigued and excited Tracy to her world of sex, drugs, and crime. Tracy's behavior and priorities dramatically shift. She frequently skips class, neglects her schoolwork, and abandons her old circle of friends in favor of Evie and her clique. Evie tells Melanie that Brooke, her adult cousin and guardian, is out of town for two weeks, and Melanie agrees to let her stay at her home with Tracy. While staying there, Evie discovers that Tracy regularly cuts herself to cope with stress. Although Melanie sees a drastic change in Tracy's personality and worries about the extent of Evie's influence, she cannot find a way to intervene. Melanie attempts to send Evie home but reluctantly lets her stay after Evie claims Brooke's boyfriend is physically and sexually abusive. As Tracy and Evie become closer, Tracy grows increasingly hostile towards Melanie.

Evie and Tracy engage in more destructive activities, each egging the other on. The pair attempt to seduce Tracy's adult neighbor, Luke, and ditch a family movie night to get high on the streets in Hollywood. Mason is shocked when he bumps into Tracy wearing revealing clothing, including thong underwear, but Tracy dismisses his concerns. Later on, the girls take turns inhaling from a can of gas duster for electronics and become so intoxicated that they take turns hitting each other.

Melanie attempts to break the girls' friendship by sending Tracy to live with her father, but he refuses, claiming to be too busy. After Evie's stay extends over two weeks, Melanie unsuccessfully attempts to contact Brooke and then visits Brooke's home with Evie and Tracy. They find that Brooke was hiding because of a botched plastic surgery. Evie asks Melanie to formally adopt her but Melanie refuses. Tracy meekly supports her mother's decision. Angry and hurt, a tearful Evie storms off. Later at school, Evie ostracizes Tracy, turns the clique against her, and spreads rumors about her. Tracy slowly begins to realize the negative effects of her lifestyle when she is told that she will have to repeat the seventh grade.

While walking home from school, Brady offers Tracy a ride and takes her home, where Melanie, Evie, and Brooke sit quietly in the living room waiting for her. Brooke, having been convinced by Evie that it was Tracy who was the bad influence, confronts Tracy about her drug use and stealing. Outraged, Tracy insists that Evie is the instigator, but the skeptical Brooke refuses to listen and announces that she is moving Evie to Ojai to keep her away from Tracy. When Melanie defends Tracy's innocence, Brooke pulls Tracy's sleeve up to show her self-harm scars.

After a violent, intense screaming match, Melanie orders Brooke and Evie to leave the house and tries to comfort Tracy. Tracy breaks down and tearfully fights against Melanie's embrace. Melanie persists and assures Tracy that she loves her and will not let her go, and the two fall asleep together on Tracy's bed. The last scene shows Tracy spinning alone and screaming on a park merry-go-round during the daytime.

== Cast ==
- Evan Rachel Wood as Tracy Freeland, a smart, mild-mannered teenager who has increased depression
- Nikki Reed as Evie Zamora, considered the most stylish and popular girl
- Holly Hunter as Melanie Freeland, a single mother of Tracy and Mason and a recovering alcoholic
- Jeremy Sisto as Brady, an ex-addict and Melanie's boyfriend
- Brady Corbet as Mason Freeland, Melanie's son and Tracy's older brother
- Deborah Kara Unger as Brooke LaLaine
- Sarah Clarke as Birdie
- Vanessa Anne Hudgens as Noel
- Kip Pardue as Luke
- D. W. Moffett as Travis Freeland
- Jenicka Carey as Astrid
- Ulysses Estrada as Rafa
- Sarah Blakely-Cartwright as Medina
- Jasmine Di Angelo as Kayla
- Tessa Ludwick as Yumi
- Cynthia Ettinger as Cynthia
- Charles Duckworth as Javi

== Production ==
=== Development ===
Director Catherine Hardwicke, who had worked prior as a film production designer, has called Nikki Reed a "surrogate daughter", having known her since she was five years old. Hardwicke met Nikki while dating her father. The two began the screenplay as a comedy project which would be shot to video at minimal cost. The screenplay was written over a period of six days in January 2002, and quickly shifted into a tale of early teen angst and self-destruction in Los Angeles, with Tracy's character drawn from Reed's own recent experiences as an early teen. Reed said she specifically was inspired by experiencing her friends' arrests for dealing methamphetamine when she was thirteen years old.

Reed later stated in 2012 that she regrets the way she portrayed her family in the autobiographical film, saying, "I wrote this movie about them and their flaws and imperfections and what it was like growing up. It was from one kid's perspective and not a well-rounded one. You get older and it's like, how dare I portray my father as being a totally vacant careless schmuck?"

After completing the script, Hardwicke pitched the idea to various producers she knew, but said that most were "terrified" of the project because of the subject matter. "All the characters are women, and it was going to be rated R and about a teenager. That does not check the boxes for any studio", Hardwicke said of the difficulty of finding financiers for the film.

=== Casting ===
Hardwicke didn't think it would be fitting for Reed to play Tracy and auditioned hundreds of girls for the part. After becoming aware of Evan Rachel Wood, Hardwicke came to believe she could make the film only with Wood in the role of Tracy and only that year, with Wood at that age. Before Wood's casting, Michelle Trachtenberg was initially cast in the role of Tracy but had to withdraw due to commitments to Buffy the Vampire Slayer.

Hardwicke has said Holly Hunter's agreement to play the role of Tracy's mother Melanie was a key boost to bringing the production together; she met with Hunter in New York City to discuss the film, after which Hunter agreed to take the part. Hunter recalled: "I read the script and it was a very visceral experience. It's extremely raw, it was not a filled-in picture. It felt more like a feeling than anything else. And that's unusual for a script to communicate like that. It sort of declares itself, it comes at you. And the movie does, too. And that's unusual, for a movie to be able to have the same impetus on the screen that it has on the page." Brie Larson, who was herself 13 when the film released, auditioned for one of the parts in the film but was rejected.

Hardwicke subsequently managed to raise approximately $2 million, almost all through independent equity financing. Most of the adult actors were widely known and all of them reportedly agreed to low pay because they liked the script along with other members of the cast and crew. Wood and Reed were both 14 years old during filming (Wood turned 15 during the shoot).

=== Filming ===
Thirteen was shot on lower-cost super 16mm film over a period of 24 days between July 2002 and September 2002. The camera was small, had a Panavision lens, and was mostly hand-held by cinematographer Elliot Davis, which helped achieve a documentary, "cinéma vérité" style. Principal photography took place on location in Los Angeles, with Melrose Avenue, Hollywood Boulevard, and Venice Beach serving as filming locations. The Freeland home scenes were shot at a rented house in the San Fernando Valley. The outdoor school scenes were shot at Portola Middle School in Tarzana, California.

Some scenes in the film were carefully and colorfully lit, while others were shot only with whatever daylight could be had. Due to child labor laws, the underage performers were only allowed to work a regulated number of hours per day. This made for a frenetic production atmosphere, which cast and crew later said matched the script and added to the film's fast and emotionally taut pace. The film stock was transferred to the digital domain wherein the colors and saturation were highly manipulated for some segments. The beginning of the film was very slightly desaturated in the scenes before Tracy became friends with Evie. Once they became friends, the saturation was increased to a "glowy" effect, according to Hardwicke. After the scene where Evie and Tracy make out with Luke, the saturation slowly becomes less and less until the end of the film, especially after Evie is told that she can't live with Tracy anymore and Tracy is abandoned by the popular group.

The wardrobe worn by the girls was mostly their own. As filming progressed, the girls began dressing similarly without being asked to do so. The girls did not take any dangerous substances during the film. They are shown smoking cigarettes, but these were filled mostly with catnip. The crushed pills they are shown snorting from the cover of a children's book were actually vitamins.

All of the scenes in which Tracy cut herself were shot in a single day; Wood recalled running to her brother for emotional support between some takes. Wood later described the shooting of the two make-out scenes with Javi and Luke as "awkward" because her family was watching behind the scenes. Wood's mother requested that in the scenes with Tracy's bra exposed, the front of her not be seen on camera. The whole scene with Luke was rendered in a single, long and uncut take with Wood, Reed, and Pardue but was tightly choreographed with several crew members, social workers and parents also in the small room, carefully staying either hidden or behind the camera as it panned more than 200°, showing all four walls.

== Reception ==
=== Box office ===
Thirteen was picked up by Fox Searchlight Pictures after production was completed while Working Title Films held U.K. rights with Working Title's parent company Universal Pictures distributing the film in the United Kingdom and Ireland through United International Pictures. The film debuted at the Sundance Film Festival on January 17, 2003. In the United States, it was given a limited release on August 20, 2003, in New York City, followed by its Los Angeles premiere on August 22. At the film's premiere screenings in Manhattan, brochures for Drug Abuse Resistance Education (D.A.R.E.) were distributed.

During its opening weekend, the film earned $116,260 at the U.S. box office, showing on 5 screens. Its release expanded to 243 theaters on September 19, 2003, and it went on to gross a total of $4,601,043 in the United States before concluding its theatrical run on December 18, 2003. In international markets, it grossed a further $5,527,917, making for a worldwide gross of $10.1 million.

=== Critical response ===
On the review aggregator website Rotten Tomatoes, 81% of 155 critics' reviews are positive, with an average rating of 7.3/10. The website's consensus reads: "An emotionally wrenching, not to mention terrifying, film about the perils of being a teenager." Metacritic, which uses a weighted average, assigned the film a score of 70 out of 100, based on 37 critics, indicating "generally favorable" reviews.

Film critic Roger Ebert awarded the film three-and-a-half out of four stars, writing: "Who is this movie for? Not for most 13-year-olds, that's for sure. The R rating is richly deserved, no matter how much of a lark the poster promises. Maybe the film is simply for those who admire fine, focused acting and writing; Thirteen sets a technical problem that seems insoluble, and meets it brilliantly, finding convincing performances from its teenage stars, showing [...] a parent who is clueless but not uncaring, and a world outside that bedroom window that has big bad wolves, and worse." Elvis Mitchell of The New York Times wrote: "The movie has the ebb and flow that come from material structured as a series of anecdotes—it doesn't build, and sometimes feels as cluttered as a 13-year-old's bedroom. But that may be a byproduct of Catherine Hardwicke, making her directorial debut, working to layer incidents that are as far as possible from the weary set of clichés that inform pictures about teenagers. Usually, the protagonist is the bystander—in Thirteen, she's the fuse."

Writing for the Los Angeles Times, Manohla Dargis characterized the film as an "arty exploitation flick," adding: "Only audiences that have been locked inside a bomb shelter for the last 50 years will be shocked by what happens in Thirteen. The clothes are scantier and the music heavier on the bass since James Dean yelled "You're tearing me apart!" to his befuddled father in the mid-1950s melodrama Rebel Without a Cause. But the story about the anguished outsider trying to fit in no matter what hasn't changed much since the movies discovered the troubled teenager." The Washington Post's Laura Stepp noted in her review that the film "portrays adolescence at its most desperate. If you have a daughter in her early teens or almost there, the R-rated film will make you want to run home, hold her tightly for a few minutes, and then lock her up while you struggle with all the questions the film raises but doesn't answer."

The Hollywood Reporter called the film "a chilling look at a pair of contemporary Valley girls—13-year-olds who are way beyond their years but also are nearly beyond repair," while the Chicago Tribune's Michael Wilmington called it "an excellent, unforgettable film," but also deemed it "extremely disturbing."

=== Awards and nominations ===
Awards	Category	Result	Ref.
Academy Awards	Best Supporting Actress (Holly Hunter)	Nominated	
BAFTA Awards	Best Actress in a Supporting Role (Holly Hunter)	Nominated	
Golden Globe Awards	Best Supporting Actress – Motion Picture (Holly Hunter)	Nominated	
Golden Globe Awards	Best Actress – Motion Picture Drama (Evan Rachel Wood)	Nominated	
Independent Spirit Awards	Best Debut Performance (Nikki Reed)	Won	
Independent Spirit Awards	Best First Feature (Catherine Hardwicke)	Nominated	
Independent Spirit Awards	Best First Screenplay (Catherine Hardwicke, Nikki Reed)	Nominated	
Locarno Festival	Silver Leopard Award (Catherine Hardwicke)	Won	
Locarno Festival	Leopard Award for Best Actress (Holly Hunter)	Won	
MTV Movie & TV Awards	Breakthrough Female Performance (Evan Rachel Wood)	Nominated	
National Board of Review	Special Recognition for Excellence in Filmmaking	Won	
Satellite Awards	Best Actress – Drama (Evan Rachel Wood)	Nominated	
Satellite Awards	Best Actress – Drama (Nikki Reed)	Nominated	
Satellite Awards	Best Director (Catherine Hardwicke)	Nominated	
Satellite Awards	Best Supporting Actress – Drama (Holly Hunter)	Nominated	
Satellite Awards	Best Motion Picture – Drama	Nominated	
Satellite Awards	Best Original Screenplay (Catherine Hardwicke, Nikki Reed)	Nominated	
Screen Actors Guild Awards	Outstanding Performance by a Female Actor in a Leading Role (Evan Rachel Wood)	Nominated	
Screen Actors Guild Awards	Outstanding Performance by a Female Actor in a Supporting Role (Holly Hunter)	Nominated	
Sundance Film Festival	Directing Award – Dramatic (Catherine Hardwicke)	Won	
Sundance Film Festival	Grand Jury Prize – Dramatic	Nominated	

== Home media and rights ==
20th Century Fox Home Entertainment released the film on DVD and VHS in the United States (Region 1) on January 27, 2004. In Australia (Region 4), it received a DVD and VHS release in mid-2004 by 20th Century Fox Home Entertainment South Pacific. That same year, it was also released on DVD in the United Kingdom (Region 2), with this release being handled by Universal Pictures Home Entertainment.

On March 20, 2019, Rupert Murdoch sold most of 21st Century Fox's film and television assets to The Walt Disney Company. This deal included both 20th Century Fox and its arthouse-focused subsidiary Fox Searchlight, which was the primary distributor of Thirteen. The film's rights in the United Kingdom and Ireland are still held by Universal, rather than Disney, as Universal originally controlled all distribution rights for those countries.

== Soundtrack ==
Thirteen

Soundtrack album by Various
- Released: August 19, 2003
- Genre: Soundtrack
- Length: 58:23
- Label: Nettwerk

The score was written by Mark Mothersbaugh. An official soundtrack was released on August 19, 2003, by Nettwerk Records, which includes songs by Liz Phair, Clinic, Folk Implosion, Imperial Teen, Katy Rose, The Like, and MC 900 Ft. Jesus.

=== Track listing ===
No.	Title	Writer(s)	Performer(s)	Length
1.	"Mas"	Carlos Chairez · Joaquin Lozano ·Juan Gongora · Agustin Cerezo	Kinky	4:21
2.	"Super Bad Girl"	Kirk Johnson · Tom Merkle · John Fields	Iffy	4:18
3.	"The Equaliser"	Clinic	Clinic	3:43
4.	"Ivanka"	Roddy Bottum · Will Schwartz · Lynn Perko · Jone Stebbins	Imperial Teen	3:17
5.	"(So I’ll Sit Here) Waiting"	Z Berg	The Like	4:37
6.	"Make It with the Best"	Lou Barlow · Wally Gagel · Russell Pollard	The Folk Implosion	3:56
7.	"Beso"	Carmen Rizzo · Jamie Muhoberac · Kinnie Starr	Carmen Rizzo featuring Kinnie Star	3:36
8.	"Killer inside Me" (Meat Beat Manifestation remix)	Mark Griffin	MC 900 Ft. Jesus	4:53
9.	"Explain It to Me"	Liz Phair	Liz Phair	3:11
10.	"Lemon"	Katy Rose · Kim Bullard	Katy Rose	4:47
11.	"Pay Attention to Me"	Orlando Brown · Mark Carter	Orlando Brown	4:15
12.	"The Freshest"	Sam Hollander · Dave Schommer	The Freshmaka featuring Chubb Rock & Tarsha Vega	2:52
13.	"Nicotine"	Annette Ducharme	Anet	3:43
14.	"Bien Caliente"	Karl Leiker · Brin Dahlheimer	The Tormentos	4:04
15.	"The Shoot Out" (score)	Mark Mothersbaugh	Mark Mothersbaugh	1:09
16.	"Hit Me" (score)	Mothersbaugh	Mothersbaugh	1:47
Total length:				00:58:23

== Bibliography ==
- Gregerson, Mary Banks (2009). The Cinematic Mirror for Psychology and Life Coaching. Springer Science & Business Media. ISBN 978-1-441-91114-8.
- Sweeney, Kathleen (2008). Maiden USA: Girl Icons Come of Age. Peter Lang. ISBN 978-0-820-48197-5.
