= Marie-Rose Armesto =

Belgian journalist

Marie-Rose Armesto (1960 – 23 January 2007) was a Spanish-born Belgian journalist. She was associate editor-in-chief for the Belgian television chain RTL-TVI.

Armesto was born in Saviñao in Galicia and came to Belgium at the age of eight, first broadcasting in 1982 on the Radio Contact radio station. She joined RTL-TVI in September 1987, eventually becoming head reporter for the chain in partnership with Jean-Pierre Martin. They married in 1984.

Armesto organized a human chain around the Berlaymont building in Brussels to call attention to ethnic cleansing in Bosnia. She publicized the plight of the missing in Chile and the victims of genocide in Rwanda. She considered Islamic terrorism the new fascism. In 2002, she published "Son mari a tué Massoud", based on an interview with the wife of one of Ahmad Shah Massoud's assassins.

Armesto died of cancer at the age of 46.
