= Romanza =

1997 compilation album by Andrea Bocelli

Compilation album by Andrea Bocelli
- Released: September 23, 1997
- Recorded: 1996
- Genres: Easy listening; operatic pop; pop
- Length: 70:13
- Labels: Sugar; Philips; Universal
- Producers: Mauro Malavasi; Frank Peterson; Michele Torpedine (also exec.); Celso Valli; Peppe Vessicchio

Andrea Bocelli chronology
Viaggio Italiano (1996)	Romanza (1997)	Aria: The Opera Album (1998)

Romanza (20th Anniversary Edition)

Compilation album by Andrea Bocelli
- Released: 18 November 2016
- Recorded: 1996; 2016
- Genres: Easy listening; operatic pop; pop
- Labels: Sugar; Universal
- Producers: Mauro Malavasi; Michele Torpedine; Beppe Vessicchio; Celso Valli; Frank Peterson

Andrea Bocelli chronology
Cinema (2015)	Romanza (20th Anniversary Edition) (2016)	Sì (2018)

Romanza is the first compilation album by Italian tenor singer Andrea Bocelli, released internationally in 1997.

Although a compilation, Romanza is considered Bocelli's breakthrough album and is his most commercially successful, topping charts throughout Europe and Latin America. With over 20 million copies sold, it is both the best-selling Italian-language album and the best-selling predominantly non-English language album of all time, as well as one of the best-selling albums worldwide.

== Background ==
The album is a compilation of Bocelli's two previous pop albums, Il mare calmo della sera, released in 1994, and Bocelli, released in 1995.

== Promotion ==
=== North America ===
As Romanza was Bocelli's first album released in the United States and Canada, both the album and Bocelli himself were heavily promoted. This included Bocelli being featured in Hotel Bellagio's commercials in North America, as well as his voice being heard in its fountain show.

PBS also played a big part in Bocelli's early success in the States, with the airing of A Night in Tuscany, Bocelli's first Great Performances special, a concert filmed in 1997 in his native Tuscany.

=== Europe ===
In August, Bocelli first appeared at the Puccini Festival in Torre del Lago, Italy, and then at the World Youth Festival, in Paris, France, where he sang in the presence of Pope John Paul II to an audience of 800,000 people.

In 1997, Bocelli won three major awards in Germany. On March 3, Bocelli appeared in Hamburg, with Sarah Brightman to receive the ECHO music award for "Best Single of the Year", for "Time to Say Goodbye", on September 14, he received an ECHO Klassik, in Munich, for "Best seller of the year", for his previous album, Viaggio Italiano, and finally, on October 25, Bocelli received a Bambi award, an annual television and media prize awarded by the German media company Hubert Burda Media, in Cologne. All three ceremonies were broadcast live in Germany.

The album was also supported in Germany, by a series of concerts, including 22 open-air concerts in the country, as well as an indoor concert in Oberhausen. His German Tour started in Locarno, Switzerland on June 6, and ended in Berlin on August 30, with other venues including Hannover, Hamburg, Münster, Rügen, Koblenz, Aachen, Wiesbaden, Kiel, Stuttgart, Leverkusen, Baden-Baden, Dresden, Coburg, Leipzig, München, Kassel, Halle, Essen, Aschaffenburg, and Nuremberg.

In the United Kingdom, Bocelli held a concert with Sarah Brightman, at the Royal Albert Hall, in London, in the fall.

Back in Italy, on September 27, Bocelli sang again before the Pope at the International Eucharistic Congress, in Bologna. On October 19, he sang at the TeleFood benefit concert held in Vatican City, and organised by the Food and Agriculture Organization to raise awareness about world hunger.

On December 15 and 20, 1997, Bocelli held a concert in Palais Omnisports de Paris-Bercy, in Paris, and a concert in Seefeld, Austria.

Bocelli also performed the French version of "Vivo per lei" with French singer, Hélène Ségara, on television programmes in France and Belgium, the Spanish version of song with Spanish singer, Marta Sánchez, on television programmes in Spain, and the German version of the song with German singer, Judy Weiss, on television programmes in Germany and Switzerland. A music video for each of those three versions was released in those countries. In addition, a music video of the Portuguese version of the song, sang with Brazilian singer Sandy, was also released in Brazil and Portugal, contributing to Romanza's success in the two countries.

== Romanza (20th Anniversary Edition) ==
In 2016, a new special edition of the album was released worldwide to celebrate 20 years since the album's original release. The original album has been remastered and including also three bonus tracks.

== Romanza (30th Anniversary World Tour) ==
In 2026, Bocelli launched the Romanza – 30th Anniversary World Tour to mark three decades since the album's release. The tour included performances in North America, Mexico and Europe, with venues including Madison Square Garden in New York, the Hollywood Bowl in Los Angeles and Piazza San Marco in Venice.

== Track listing ==
International standard listing
No.	Title	Writer(s)	Producer(s)	Length
1.	"Con te partirò"	Francesco Sartori; Lucio Quarantotto	Mauro Malavasi	4:09
2.	"Vivere" (featuring Gerardina Trovato)	Gerardina Trovato; Angelo Anastasio; Celso Valli	Michele Torpedine; Celso Valli	4:41
3.	"Per Amore"	Mariella Nava	Malavasi	4:42
4.	"Il Mare Calmo Della Sera"	Gianpietro Felisatti; Malise; Gloria Nuti	Torpedine; Valli	4:40
5.	"Caruso"	Lucio Dalla	Torpedine; Peppe Vessicchio	5:16
6.	"Macchine da Guerra"	Angus Smith	Malavasi	4:08
7.	"Le Tue Parole"	Joe Amoruso; Sergio Cirillo	Malavasi	3:57
8.	"Vivo per lei" (featuring Giorgia)	Valerio Zelli; Art Mengo; Gatto Panceri	Malavasi	4:23
9.	"Romanza"	Malavasi	Malavasi	3:41
10.	"La Luna Che Non C'è"	Dario Farina; Antonella Maggio	Torpedine; Vessicchio	4:30
11.	"Rapsodia"	Malise	Torpedine; Vessicchio	5:28
12.	"Voglio Restare Così"	Andrea Bocelli	Malavasi	3:51
13.	"E Chiove"	Amoruso; Cirillo	Malavasi	4:21
14.	"Miserere" (featuring John Miles) (live) (bonus track)	Zucchero		4:20
15.	"Time to Say Goodbye" (featuring Sarah Brightman)	Sartori; Quarantotto; Frank Peterson	Frank Peterson	4:04

Romanza (Italian and Spanish version) standard listing
No.	Title	Writer(s)	Length
1.	"Por ti Volaré"	Sartori; Quarantotto	4:09
2.	"Vivere" (with Gerardina Trovato)	Trovato	4:41
3.	"Por Amor"	Nava	4:42
4.	"El Silencio de la Espera"	Felisatti; Malise; Nuti	4:40
5.	"Caruso"	Dalla	5:16
6.	"Le Tue Parole"	Amoruso; Cirillo	3:57
7.	"Vivo por Ella" (with Marta Sánchez)	Zelli; Mengo; Panceri	4:23
8.	"Romanza"	Malavasi	3:41
9.	"Voglio Restare Così"	Bocelli	3:51
10.	"E Chiove"	Amoruso; Cirillo	4:21
11.	"Miserere" (with John Miles – bonus track)	Zucchero	4:20
12.	"Time to Say Goodbye" (with Sarah Brightman)	Sartori; Quarantotto; Peterson	4:07

Romanza (20th Anniversary Edition)
No.	Title	Writer(s)	Length
1.	"Con te partirò"	Francesco Sartori; Lucio Quarantotto	4:09
2.	"Vivere" (with Gerardina Trovato)	Gerardina Trovato	4:41
3.	"Per Amore"	Mariella Nava	4:42
4.	"Il Mare Calmo Della Sera"	Gianpietro Felisatti; Malise; Gloria Nuti	4:40
5.	"Caruso"	Lucio Dalla	5:16
6.	"Macchine da Guerra"	Angus Smith	4:08
7.	"Le Tue Parole"	Joe Amoruso; Sergio Cirillo	3:57
8.	"Vivo per lei" (with Giorgia)	Valerio Zelli; Art Mengo; Gatto Panceri	4:23
9.	"Romanza"	Mauro Malavasi	3:41
10.	"La Luna Che Non C'è"	Dario Farina; Antonella Maggio	4:30
11.	"Rapsodia"	Malise	5:28
12.	"Voglio Restare Così"	Andrea Bocelli	3:51
13.	"E Chiove"	Amoruso; Cirillo	4:21
14.	"Miserere" (with John Miles – bonus track)	Zucchero	4:20
15.	"Time to Say Goodbye" (with Sarah Brightman)	Sartori; Quarantotto; Frank Peterson	4:04
16.	"Con te partirò (orchestra 2016 version)" (bonus track – Romanza 20th Anniversary)	Sartori; Quarantotto	4:14
17.	"Con te partirò (piano and voice 2016 version)" (bonus track – Romanza 20th Anniversary)	Sartori; Quarantotto	4:03
18.	"Il Mare Calmo Della Sera (2016 version)" (bonus track – Romanza 20th Anniversary)	Gianpietro Felisatti; Malise; Gloria Nuti	4:14
19.	"Con te partirò (orchestra instrumental 2016 version)" (extra bonus – digital only – Romanza 20th Anniversary)	Sartori; Quarantotto	4:17
20.	"Con te partirò (orchestra and choir 2016 version)" (extra bonus – digital only – Romanza 20th Anniversary)	Sartori; Quarantotto	4:17

== Commercial performance ==
First in Europe, then on charts around the world, the album amassed a multitude of platinum and multi-platinum awards, outselling even Bocelli's 1995 album, Bocelli, with worldwide sales in excess of 20 million copies.

With more than 350,000 units sold in Switzerland, it is the second best-selling album in history there, and with over two million copies sold in France, it is among the top 10 best-selling albums ever in the country.

It also received triple platinum status in the United States with 4.2 million copies sold, being Bocelli's first album released in the States, and Diamond status in Canada. Actual sales stand at 1,133,000 copies across Canada according to Nielsen, making Romanza the best-selling album by a foreign artist of the Nielsen SoundScan era, and the fourth best-selling overall, in Canada.

To date, the album remains Bocelli's most commercially successful, and is considered his breakthrough album, launching his career worldwide.

== Charts ==
=== Weekly charts ===
Weekly chart performance for Romanza
Chart (1997–2002)	Peak position
Australian Albums (ARIA)	2
Austrian Albums (Ö3 Austria)	1
Belgian Albums (Ultratop Flanders)	2
Belgian Albums (Ultratop Wallonia)	1
Canada Top Albums/CDs (RPM)	5
Czech Republican Albums (IFPI CR)	1
Danish Albums (Hitlisten)	1
Dutch Albums (Album Top 100)	1
Eurochart (Music & Media)	1
Finnish Albums (Suomen virallinen lista)	3
French Albums (SNEP)	1
German Albums (Offizielle Top 100)	2
Hungarian Albums (MAHASZ)	4
Italian Albums (FIMI)	5
New Zealand Albums (RMNZ)	8
Norwegian Albums (VG-lista)	1
Portuguese Albums (AFP)	1
Swedish Albums (Sverigetopplistan)	5
Swiss Albums (Schweizer Hitparade)	1
UK Albums (Official Charts)	6
US Billboard 200	35
US Top Catalog Albums (Billboard)	1
US World Albums (Billboard)	1

=== Year-end charts ===
1997 year-end chart performance for Romanza
Chart (1997)	Position
Belgian Albums (Ultratop Flanders)	53
Belgian Albums (Ultratop Wallonia)	17
Danish Albums (Hitlisten)	13
Dutch Albums (Album Top 100)	4
European Top 100 Albums (Music & Media)	2
French Albums (SNEP)	1
German Albums (Offizielle Top 100)	3
Swedish Albums (Sverigetopplistan)	64
Swiss Albums (Schweizer Hitparade)	1

1998 year-end chart performance for Romanza
Chart (1998)	Position
Australian Albums (ARIA)	13
Belgian Albums (Ultratop Flanders)	80
Belgian Albums (Ultratop Wallonia)	19
Canadian Albums (RPM)	9
Danish Albums (Hitlisten)	26
Dutch Albums (Album Top 100)	15
European Top 100 Albums (Music & Media)	16
French Albums (SNEP)	18
German Albums (Offizielle Top 100)	87
Swedish Albums (Sverigetopplistan)	29
US Billboard 200	59

1999 year-end chart performance for Romanza
Chart (1999)	Position
Australian Albums (ARIA)	39
Canadian Albums (RPM)	94
Dutch Albums (MegaCharts)	52
New Zealand Albums (RIANZ)	20
US Billboard 200	73

2000 year-end chart performance for Romanza
Chart (2000)	Position
Australian Albums (ARIA)	57
Canadian Albums (Nielsen SoundScan)	154

2001 year-end chart performance for Romanza
Chart (2001)	Position
UK Albums (OCC)	129

== Sales and certifications ==
Certifications and sales for Romanza
Region	Certification	Certified units/sales
Argentina (CAPIF) Italian edition	3× Platinum	500,000
Argentina (CAPIF) Spanish edition	3× Platinum	500,000
Australia (ARIA)	7× Platinum	490,000^{^}
Austria (IFPI Austria)	Platinum	50,000^{*}
Belgium (BRMA)	2× Platinum	100,000^{*}
Brazil (Pro-Música Brasil)	Gold	900,000
Canada (Music Canada)	Diamond	1,133,000
Chile	4× Platinum	120,000
Czech Republic	6× Platinum	182,000
Finland (Musiikkituottajat)	Gold	28,592
France (SNEP)	Diamond	2,000,000
Germany (BVMI)	Platinum	1,000,000
Greece (IFPI Greece)	Gold	30,000^{^}
Hungary (MAHASZ)	Platinum	
Italy	—	800,000
Italy (FIMI) since 2009	Gold	30,000^{*}
Mexico	—	650,000
Netherlands (NVPI)	2× Platinum	200,000^{^}
New Zealand (RMNZ)	3× Platinum	45,000^{^}
Norway (IFPI Norway)	3× Platinum	150,000^{*}
Poland (ZPAV)	Platinum	100,000^{*}
Portugal (AFP)	5× Platinum	200,000^{^}
Spain (Promusicae)	3× Platinum	500,000
Sweden (GLF)	Platinum	80,000^{^}
Switzerland (IFPI Switzerland)	7× Platinum	350,000^{^}
United Kingdom (BPI)	Platinum	300,000^{^}
United States (RIAA)	3× Platinum	4,200,000
Summaries
Europe (IFPI)	6× Platinum	6,000,000^{*}
Worldwide	—	20,000,000
^{*} Sales figures based on certification alone.^{^} Shipments figures based on certification alone.

== PBS Special ==
A Night in Tuscany, Bocelli's first PBS Great Performances special, filmed in 1997, was designed to promote the album.

The concert held in his native Tuscany, at the Piazza dei Cavalieri, in Pisa, saw Bocelli perform two opera duets with soprano Nuccia Focile, sing "Miserere" with Italian rock star Zucchero, who discovered him in 1992, and finally "Time to Say Goodbye" with English soprano Sarah Brightman. The DVD of the full program was internationally released on November 10, 1998.

== See also ==
- List of best-selling albums
- List of best-selling albums in Argentina
- List of best-selling albums in Brazil
- List of best-selling albums in Canada
- List of best-selling albums in Italy
- List of best-selling albums in France
- List of diamond-certified albums in Canada
- List of European number-one hits of 1997
