= Miserere (album) =

Studio album by Zucchero
- Released: 1 October 1992
- Studio: Studio Miraval (Correns)
- Genres: Blues rock, soul, funk
- Length: 48:25
- Label: Polydor
- Producer: Corrado Rustici

Zucchero chronology
Zucchero Live at the Kremlin (1991)	Miserere (1992)	Diamante (1994)

Miserere is the sixth studio album by Italian blues rock singer-songwriter Zucchero Fornaciari released in 1992 by Polydor Records.

== Overview ==
The album Miserere (Have Mercy) is a much darker album than Fornaciari's previous works, made clear from the album's and same-titled song, as well theme. It reflects his intimate personal life from the time when he lived in solitude and depression after his divorce. According to Zucchero, it's the result of three years of desperation, torn between Emilia where his parents lived, and Versilia where his wife and daughters lived, living in a small house near the sea in Marina di Pietrasanta, with a dog and one bottle. Later while he was near the countryside of Pontremoli, he saw a green valley with a ruin and river, went down near them, and for the first time in a period felt at home. There he built his current home.

Beside the title song, his state of mind and emotions are evident from the songs like "Ridammi Il Sole" (Give Me Back The Sun), "Povero Cristo" (Poor Christ), as well others, many with irony. The title song "Miserere" was written in one morning.

The album includes collaborations: Elvis Costello co-wrote the track "Miss Mary", U2's Bono was responsible for the English version of "Miserere", the first of several future collaborations, recorded with Luciano Pavarotti; Paul Buchanan of The Blue Nile co-wrote two tracks ("Ridammi Il Sole", "It's All Right (La Promessa)"); as well as guest appearances by Wayne Jackson and Andrew Love (#7, #8) from The Memphis Horns.

Although the song "Miserere" was recorded by Pavarotti, during its audition it was also performed by then unknown Andrea Bocelli. He would record it in his first studio album Il mare calmo della sera, of which the same-titled single was co-written by Zucchero. During his career the song "Miserere" was often performed along Pavarotti and Bocelli.

There's a hidden track in the end of "Miserere" with lyrics "A volte, la migliore musica è il silenzio... diciamo" (Sometimes, the best music is silence... let's say). Take note that the lyric is said twice and a half as the lyrics becomes like this: "A volte, la migliore musica è il s..."

== Release ==
It topped the album charts in Italy for 13 weeks, being certified 7× Platinum in Italy, for more than 1,400,000 copies sold, and Platinum in Switzerland (#8).

It was also released an English edition; "L'Urlo" featured Léo Ferré, "It's All Right (La Promessa)" is in English and named "The Promise (It's Alright)", "Il Pelo Nell'Uovo" is in English and named "Brick", "Ridammi Il Sole" is in English and named "Come Back the Sun", so is "I Frati" named "Gone Fishing", and "Miserere" (English version).

== Track listing ==
All tracks are written by Zucchero Fornaciari, except where noted

No.	Title	Writer(s)	Length
1.	"Miserere (Overture)"		0:36
2.	"L'Urlo"	Zucchero, Tyrone Moss, Michael Brown	3:20
3.	"It's All Right (La Promessa)"	Zucchero, Paul Buchanan	5:26
4.	"Il Pelo Nell'Uovo"		4:49
5.	"Miss Mary"	Zucchero, Elvis Costello	4:27
6.	"Anna Solatia"		3:48
7.	"Un'Orgia Di Anime Perse"		3:43
8.	"Pene"		5:27
9.	"Povero Cristo"		3:49
10.	"Ridammi Il Sole"	Zucchero, Paul Buchanan	4:34
11.	"I Frati (Ovvero L'Osteria Della Felicità)"	Zucchero, Gordon Lyon	3:35
12.	"Miserere (With Luciano Pavarotti)" (The song "Miserere" ends at 4:15. After 15 seconds of silence, begins an untitled hidden track: there is a raucous voice that says for two times and a half, as that third time is abruptly cut short. "A volte la migliore musica è il silenzio, diciamo [Sometimes the best music is the silence, let's say]".)	Zucchero, Bono (English Version)	4:50

== Musicians ==
- Zucchero - vocals
- Corrado Rustici - guitars, backing vocals
- Peter-John Vettese - keyboards
- David Sancious - keyboards
- Polo Jones - bass
- Michael Shrieve - drums
- Martin Beedle - drums
- Karl Perazzo - percussion
- Raul Rekow - percussion
- Rosario Jermano - percussion
- Andy Forest - harmonica
- The Memphis Horns - Wayne Jackson and Andrew Love
- Luciano Pavarotti - vocals
- Mino Vergnaghi, Iskra Menarini, Antonella Pepe, Giorgia Todrani, Tessa Niles, Lance Ellington, Linda Taylor, Carol Kenyon, "I Soparis", UK Gospel Fusion - backing vocals
- Michael Kamen - string arrangements
