= A Night in Tuscany =

- Directed by: David Amphlett
- Starring: Andrea Bocelli
- Distributed by: Philips
- Release date: 10 November 1997
- Running time: 86 minutes
- Country: Italy
- Language: Italian

A Night in Tuscany is the first DVD released by Italian singer Andrea Bocelli of a concert which took place at the Piazza dei Cavalieri in Pisa in 1997. The concert includes duets with soprano Nuccia Focile, Italian rock star Zucchero, and English soprano Sarah Brightman.

The concert was also Bocelli's first PBS Special, part of the In the Spotlight series, designed to promote his breakthrough album, Romanza. It also marked his debut to the American audience.

== Programme ==
1. "Introduction"
2. "Setting the Stage"
3. "Nessun Dorma"
4. "La Donna e Mobile"
5. "Lamento di Federico"
6. "E Luceane le Selle"
7. "Interview with Andrea"
8. "O Soave Fanicullia" (duet with Nuccia Focile)
9. "Brindisi" (duet with Nuccia Focile)
10. "Andrea and his family"
11. "Torna a Surriento"
12. "Santa Lucia Luntana"
13. "O Sole Mio"
14. "Andrea in the studio"
15. "Vivo por Ella" (duet with Martha Sanchez)
16. "Con Te Partiro"
17. "Romanza"
18. "*E Chiove"
19. "Voglio Restare Cosi"
20. "Caruso"
21. "Il Mare Calmo Della Serra"
22. "Miserere" (duet with Zucchero)
23. "Time to Say Goodbye" (duet with Sarah Brightman)
24. "Closing Credits"

*Arrangiamenti orchestrali del M° Paolo Raffone

== Charts ==
Chart (2006)	Peak position
Dutch Music DVD (MegaCharts)	1
UK Music Videos (Official Charts)	30
US Music Video Sales (Billboard)	7

== Certifications ==
Region	Certification	Certified units/sales
Australia (ARIA)	Platinum	15,000^{^}
Canada (Music Canada)	2× Platinum	20,000^{^}
United Kingdom (BPI)	Platinum	50,000^{^}
United States (RIAA)	2× Platinum	200,000^{^}
^{^} Shipments figures based on certification alone.
