= Il mare calmo della sera =

Studio album by Andrea Bocelli
- Released: April 18, 1994
- Genre: Classical crossover
- Label: Polygram International

Andrea Bocelli chronology
Il mare calmo della sera (1994)	Bocelli (1995)

Il mare calmo della sera is Italian tenor Andrea Bocelli's first album, released only in Italy in 1994. It was followed by the release of Bocelli in 1995, his second pop album which outsold the first, then by Romanza in 1997. Between the releases of Bocelli and Romanza, Viaggio italiano, his first classical album, was released.

== Track listing ==
1. "Il mare calmo della sera" (Malise, Gloria Nuti, Gianpietro Felisatti)
2. "Ave Maria No Morro" (Matins Herivelto) (Cover: Trio De Ouro - Ave Maria no morro 1942)
3. "Vivere" feat. Gerardina Trovato (Celso Valli, Angelo Anastasio, Gerardina Trovato)
4. "Rapsodia" (Mailse)
5. "La luna che non c'è" (Dario Farina, Antonella Maggio)
6. "Caruso" (Lucio Dalla) (Cover: Lucio Dalla - Caruso 1986)
7. "Miserere" (Paul Hewson, Adelmo "Zucchero" Fornaciari) (Cover: Zucchero & Luciano Pavarotti - Miserere 1992)
8. "Panis Angelicus" (César Franck)
9. "Ah, la paterna mano" (Giuseppe Verdi)
10. "E lucevan le stelle" (Giacomo Puccini)
11. "La fleur que tu m'avais jetée" (Georges Bizet)
12. "L'anima ho stanca" (Arturo Colautti, Francesco Cilèa)
13. "Sogno" (Francesco Paolo Tosti, Giuseppe Vessicchio, Giuseppe Servillo)hitparade.ch

== Chart performance ==
Weekly chart performance for Il mare calmo della sera
Chart (1994–1996)	Peak position
Austrian Albums (Ö3 Austria)	33
Belgian Albums (Ultratop Flanders)	9
Belgian Albums (Ultratop Wallonia)	2
Dutch Albums (Album Top 100)	11
French Albums (SNEP)	16
German Albums (Offizielle Top 100)	40

== Certifications ==
Certifications for Il mare calmo della sera
Region	Certification	Certified units/sales
Belgium (BRMA)	Platinum	50,000^{*}
Netherlands (NVPI)	Gold	50,000^{^}
^{*} Sales figures based on certification alone.^{^} Shipments figures based on certification alone.
