= Sanremo Music Festival 1994 =

Italian song contest (44th edition)

Dates and venue
- Semi-final 1: 23 February 1994
- Semi-final 2: 24 February 1994
- Semi-final 3: 25 February 1994
- Final: 26 February 1994
- Venue: Teatro Ariston; Sanremo, Italy

Organisation
- Broadcaster: Radiotelevisione italiana (RAI)
- Musical director: Pippo Caruso
- Artistic director: Pippo Baudo
- Presenters: Pippo Baudo and Anna Oxa, Cannelle

Big Artists section
- Number of entries: 20
- Winner: "Passerà"; Aleandro Baldi

Newcomers' section
- Number of entries: 18
- Winner: "Il mare calmo della sera" Andrea Bocelli

The Sanremo Music Festival 1994 (Italian: Festival di Sanremo 1994), officially the 44th Italian Song Festival (44º Festival della canzone italiana), was the 44th annual Sanremo Music Festival, held at the Teatro Ariston in Sanremo in late February 1994 and broadcast by Radiotelevisione italiana (RAI). The show was presented by Pippo Baudo, who also served as the artistic director, with singer Anna Oxa (who had won the festival in 1989) and model Cannelle. Antonella Clerici hosted the segments with the juries.

The winner of the Big Artists section was Aleandro Baldi with the ballad "Passerà", while Giorgio Faletti ranked second and won the Critics Award with "Signor tenente", an anti-mafia rap song inspired by massacres of Capaci and Via D'Amelio. Andrea Bocelli won the Newcomers section with the song "Il mare calmo della sera".

After every night Rai 1 broadcast DopoFestival, a talk show about the Festival with the participation of singers and journalists. It was hosted by Mara Venier and Pippo Baudo with Renato Zero and Roberto D'Agostino.

== Participants and results ==
=== Big Artists ===
Big Artists section
Song	Artist(s)	Songwriter(s)	Rank
"Passerà"	Aleandro Baldi	Aleandro Baldi; Giancarlo Bigazzi; Marco Falagiani	1
"Signor tenente"	Giorgio Faletti	Giorgio Faletti	2 / Mia Martini Critics Award
"Strani amori"	Laura Pausini	Angelo Valsiglio; Roberto Buti; Cheope; Marco Marati; Francesco Tanini	3
"Non è un film"	Gerardina Trovato	Angelo Anastasio; Celso Valli; Gerardina Trovato	4
"Cinque giorni"	Michele Zarrillo	Vincenzo Incenzo; Michele Zarrillo	5
"I soliti accordi"	Enzo Jannacci & Paolo Rossi	Enzo Jannacci; Paolo Rossi; Paolo Jannacci	6
"Maledette malelingue"	Ivan Graziani	Ivan Graziani	7
"Amare amare"	Andrea Mingardi	Andrea Mingardi; Maurizio Tirelli	8
"Esser duri"	Marco Armani	Marco Armenise; Luca Carboni	9
"Di notte specialmente"	Donatella Rettore	Cheope; Donatella Rettore; Claudio Rego	10
"Terra mia"	Mariella Nava	Mariella Nava	11
"La casa dell'imperatore"	Formula 3	Tony Cicco; Mario Castelnuovo	12
"Amici non ne ho"	Loredana Bertè	Loredana Bertè; Philippe Leon	13
"Crescerai"	Alessandro Canino	Bruno Zucchetti; Giuseppe Dati; Stefano Busà	14
"Statento"	Francesco Salvi	Francesco Salvi; Vittorio Cosma	15
"Oppure no"	Alessandro Bono	Alessandro Bono	16
"Se mi ami…"	Claudia Mori	Toto Cutugno	17
"L'ascensore"	Carlo Marrale	Carlo Marrale; Cheope	18
"Una vecchia canzone italiana"	Squadra Italia (Note: Squadra Italia was a supergroup formed by Nilla Pizzi, Mario Merola, Jimmy Fontana, Wilma Goich, Rosanna Fratello, Lando Fiorini, Gianni Nazzaro, Wess, Toni Santagata, Giuseppe Cionfoli and Manuela Villa (Claudio Villa's daughter).)	Stefano Jurgens; Marcello Marrocchi	19
"Napoli"	Franco Califano	Franco Califano; Alberto Laurenti; Antonio Gaudino	20

=== Newcomers ===
Newcomers section
Song	Artist(s)	Songwriter(s)	Rank
"Il mare calmo della sera"	Andrea Bocelli	Malise; Gian Pietro Felisatti; Gloria Nuti	1
"Ricordi del cuore"	Antonella Arancio	Claudio Allia; Ray Distefano	2
"Quelli come noi"	Danilo Amerio	Danilo Amerio	3
"Fuori"	Irene Grandi	Telonio; Irene Grandi	4
"Così vivrai"	Valeria Visconti	Ermanno Croce; Rossano Eleuteri	5
"Possiamo realizzare i nostri sogni"	Lighea	Stefano Jurgens; Tania Montelpare; Giulio Galgani	6
"E poi"	Giorgia	Giorgia Todrani; Massimo Calabrese; Marco Rinalduzzi	7
"Il mondo è qui"	Francesca Schiavo	Varo Venturi	8
"Il mondo dove va"	Silvia Cecchetti	Vincenzo Benedetto Scanu	9
"Senti uomo"	Giò Di Tonno	Giovanni Di Tonno; Alessandro Di Zio	10
"Cuore cuore"	Paola Angeli	Paola Angeli	Eliminated
"È solo un giorno nero"	Simona D'Alessio	Carmen Di Domenico; Claudio Pizzale	Eliminated
"I giardini d'Alhambra"	Baraonna	Fulvio Caporale; Vito Caporale	Eliminated / Critics Award / Fonopoli Best; Arrangement Award
"Io e il mio amico Neal"	Daniela Colace	Michele Ascolese; Daniela Colace	Eliminated
"Ma che sarei"	Franz Campi	Franz Campi	Eliminated
"Non spegnere i tuoi occhi"	Joe Barbieri	Joe Barbieri	Eliminated
"Propiziu ventu"	Paideja	Tina Nicoletta; Valeria Nicoletta	Eliminated
"Senza un dolore"	Daniele Fossati	Daniele Fossati	Eliminated

== Guests ==
Guests
Artist(s)	Song(s)
Matt Bianco	"Our Love"
Take That	"Relight My Fire"
k.d. lang	"Constant Craving"
Incognito	"Givin' It Up"
Dee Dee Bridgewater & Amii Stewart	"Why"
Phil Collins	"Everyday"
Elton John & RuPaul	"Don't Go Breaking My Heart"

== Broadcasts ==
=== Local broadcasts ===
All shows were broadcast on Rai Uno.

=== International broadcasts ===
The festival was also aired on Rai Internazionale Americas on delay via W13BF with the 1st and 2nd part of the final being broadcast. Known details on the broadcasts in each country, including the specific broadcasting stations and commentators are shown in the tables below.

International broadcasters of the Sanremo Music Festival 1994
Country	Broadcaster	Channel(s)	Commentator(s)	Ref(s)
United States	WNYC-TV (Note: Delayed broadcast with the parts 1–3 broadcast on 1–3 March respectively, all aired at 18:00 (EDT) with only 2 hours being broadcast in each part.)			
United States	WNYS-TV (Note: Delayed broadcast with the first part broadcast on 27 February at 18:00 (EDT),)			
