= Il mare calmo della sera (song) =

Single by Andrea Bocelli

from the album Il mare calmo della sera, Romanza, The Best of Andrea Bocelli: Vivere
- Released: 1994
- Recorded: 1994
- Genre: Operatic pop
- Length: 4:39
- Label: Sugar
- Songwriter(s): Zucchero, Gian Pietro Felisatti, Gloria Nuti

Andrea Bocelli singles chronology
| "Il mare calmo della sera" (1994) | ""Con te partirò" /"Vivere"" (1995) |

"Il mare calmo della sera" (Italian for 'The calm evening sea') is a song written by Zucchero Fornaciari, Gian Pietro Felisatti and Gloria Nuti, for Andrea Bocelli. Bocelli won the Sanremo Festival 1994 with the song, which was later released as his debut single. It is among Bocelli's most popular and well-known songs.

The chorus opening phrase is virtually the same as the chorus opening phrase in "She Believes in Me", the title of a song recorded by American country music singer Kenny Rogers released in April 1979 as the second single from his album The Gambler.

== History ==
In 1992, Bocelli's first break as a singer came when Italian rock singer Zucchero Fornaciari auditioned tenors to record a demo version of "Miserere", which he had co-written with U2's Bono. Passing the audition, Bocelli recorded the tune as a duet with Pavarotti, with whom he became very close friends, even singing at his second wedding, and funeral. After touring all over Europe with Zucchero in 1993, Bocelli was then invited to perform at the Pavarotti & Friends, held in Modena in September 1994.

Bocelli was then signed to Sugar Music by Caterina Caselli, who persuaded him to participate in the Sanremo Music Festival. He eventually won the newcomer section of the competition in 1994, with "Il mare calmo della sera".

After the festival, Bocelli released his first studio album, also titled Il mare calmo della sera. The single was also included in both of Bocelli's compilation albums, Romanza in 1997, and The Best of Andrea Bocelli: Vivere in 2007.

Bocelli also recorded a Spanish-language version of the song, titled "El silencio de la espera", which peaked at number one in Panama. This version appeared on the Spanish edition of Romanza (1997).

== Sì Forever: The Diamond Edition version ==
In 2019, following the 1 millionth selling of Sì, the 25th anniversary of Il Mare Calmo Della Sera's release was celebrated. Zucchero returned along with Gian Pietro Felisatti and Gloria Nuti, moving away from the track's Italian-language pop-rock format in exchange for an orchestral crossover track combined with Andrea singing the chorus in English.

== Charts ==
=== Weekly charts ===
==== Italian version ====
| Chart (1994–97) | Peak position |
|---|---|
| France (SNEP) | 24 |
| Netherlands (Dutch Top 40) | 29 |
| Netherlands (Single Top 100) | 31 |

==== Spanish version ====
| Chart (1998) | Peak position |
|---|---|
| Panama (Notimex) | 1 |
