= Aria: The Opera Album =

Studio album by Andrea Bocelli
- Released: April 7, 1998
- Recorded: Teatro Comunale, Florence, 7/1997
- Genre: Classical; opera
- Length: 52:45
- Label: Philips, Sugar
- Producer: Anna Barry (also exec.)

Andrea Bocelli chronology
Romanza (1997)	Aria: The Opera Album (1998)	Sogno (1999)

Aria: The Opera Album is Italian tenor Andrea Bocelli's fourth studio album, released in April 1998. The album was recognised as "best selling album of the year" in the 1998 Echo Klassik Awards.

== Track listing ==
Standard edition
No.	Title	Writer(s)	Opera	Length
1.	"Questa o quella"	Giuseppe Verdi	Rigoletto	1:47
2.	"Che gelida manina"	Giacomo Puccini	La bohème	4:21
3.	"Recondita armonia"	Puccini	Tosca	2:59
4.	"E lucevan le stelle"	Puccini	Tosca	2:53
5.	"Addio, fiorito asil"	Puccini	Madama Butterfly	1:50
6.	"Come un bel dì di maggio"	Umberto Giordano	Andrea Chénier	3:18
7.	"A te, o cara"	Vincenzo Bellini	I Puritani	3:05
8.	"Di rigori armato il seno"	Richard Strauss	Der Rosenkavalier	2:10
9.	"Amor ti vieta"	Giordano	Fedora	1:51
10.	"Ch'ella mì creda libero"	Puccini	La fanciulla del West	2:01
11.	"Cielo e mar!"	Amilcare Ponchielli	La Gioconda	4:35
12.	"La dolcissima effigie"	Francesco Cilea	Adriana Lecouvreur	2:13
13.	"Musetta!...Testa adorata"	Ruggero Leoncavallo	La bohème	3:06
14.	"Tombe degli avi miei – Fra poco a me ricovero"	Gaetano Donizetti	Lucia di Lammermoor	6:53
15.	"Pourquoi me réveiller"	Jules Massenet	Werther	3:06
16.	"La fleur que tu m'avais jetée"	Georges Bizet	Carmen	4:20
17.	"Pour mon âme"	Gaetano Donizetti	La fille du régiment	2:15

Special edition bonus tracks
No.	Title	Writer(s)	Opera	Length
18.	"Di quella pira"	Verdi	II trovatore	3:22
19.	"C'était le soir... Au fond du temple Saint"	Bizet	Les pêcheurs de perles	6:17

== Charts ==
Chart (1998)	Peak position
Australian Albums (ARIA Charts)	70
Danish Albums Chart	10
Hungarian Albums (MAHASZ)	6

=== Year-end charts ===
Chart (1998)	Position
German Albums Chart	68

== Certifications ==
Region	Certification	Certified units/sales
Australia (ARIA)	Gold	35,000^{^}
Austria (IFPI Austria)	Gold	25,000^{*}
Belgium (BRMA)	Platinum	50,000^{*}
Canada (Music Canada)	Platinum	100,000^{^}
France (SNEP)	Gold	100,000^{*}
Germany (BVMI)	Gold	250,000^{^}
Netherlands (NVPI)	Platinum	25,000^{^}
Norway (IFPI Norway)	Gold	25,000^{*}
Poland (ZPAV)	Gold	50,000^{*}
Spain (PROMUSICAE)	Platinum	100,000^{^}
Switzerland (IFPI Switzerland)	Gold	25,000^{^}
United Kingdom (BPI)	Gold	100,000^{^}
United States (RIAA)	Platinum	1,000,000^{^}
^{*} Sales figures based on certification alone.^{^} Shipments figures based on certification alone.
