= Maria Luigia Borsi =

Italian opera singer

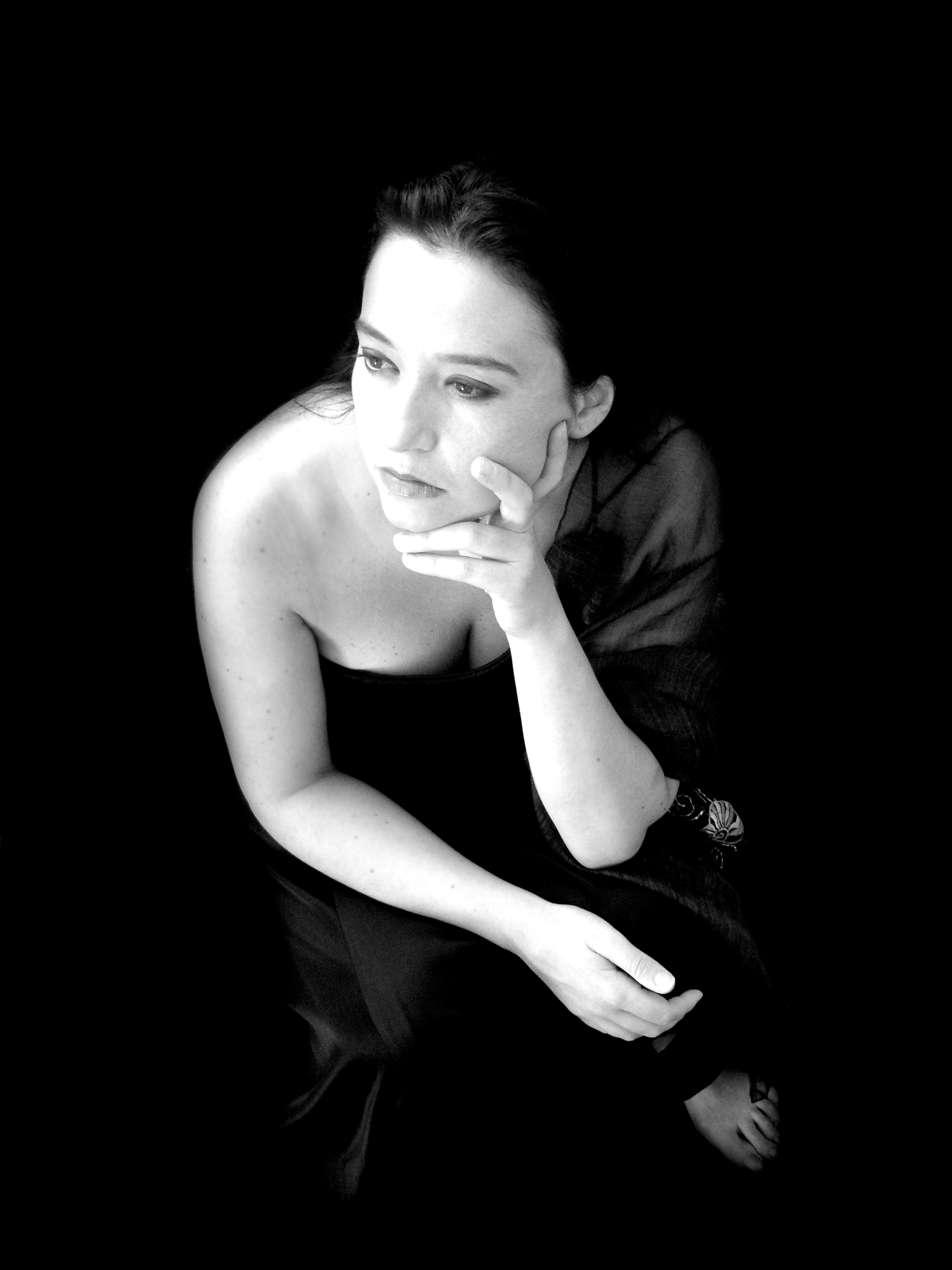
Maria Luigia Borsi soprano

Maria Luigia Borsi (born 1973) is an Italian opera singer. A lyric soprano, she is especially known for interpreting operas by Giacomo Puccini and Giuseppe Verdi. Among the qualities noted by the critical press are her breath control, phrasing, rich tone, and acting ability.

== Education and vocal training ==
Maria Luigia Borsi was born in Sora (Frosinone), Italy. Her father is Tuscan (coming from the region of Tuscany), while her mother comes from the Italian region known as the Ciociaria, just south of Rome. Borsi began her vocal studies at a very young age while singing in a choir for children, La Corale "Domenico Savio", created by Don Lelio Bausani and received a degree in vocal performance from the Istituto Musicale Pietro Mascagni in Livorno, Italy. Her main voice teachers have included Lucia Stanescu, Antonietta Stella, Renata Scotto and Claudio Desderi.

She is married to American violinist Brad Repp.

== Career ==
In 2002, Maria Luigia Borsi was the winner of the International Voice Competition of San Remo, earning the title "Best opera singer of 2002" (The president of the jury was tenor Andrea Bocelli). In 2002, 2003, 2004 and 2008 Borsi participated in tours of Asia, Australia, the United States and Europe together with tenor Andrea Bocelli.

In 2004, Borsi began her professional opera career at La Scala of Milan interpreting the role of Liù in Giacomo Puccini's opera Turandot, conductor Carlo Rizzi. Also in 2004, Borsi performed the title role in La traviata (Violetta) for the re-opening of the Venetian opera house La Fenice, conductor Lorin Maazel.

In 2006, Borsi once again performed the title role in La traviata (Violetta) at the Opernhaus Zürich together with baritone Renato Bruson, tenor Giuseppe Sabbatini, tenor José Cura and baritone Giorgio Zancanaro.

In 2007 Borsi was a guest Artist at the Special Olympics World Summer Games closing ceremony in Shanghai, together with José Carreras.

In 2008, Borsi performed the lead female role (Desdemona) in the Salzburg Festival production of Giuseppe Verdi's Otello, conductor Riccardo Muti.

Maria Luigia Borsi is also known as a recitalist and has given solo recitals at venues like Wigmore Hall. She has been a recital companion for singers like José Carreras and Leo Nucci.

== Recordings ==
- Symphony No. 9 – Ludwig van Beethoven, "Live from Vatican City", cond. Lorin Maazel, label: Kultur
- Turandot – Giacomo Puccini, cond. Keri-Lynn Wilson, label: La Fenice
- Maometto – Peter von Winter, cond. Gabriele Bellini, label: Marco Polo (UK Gramophone Award 2004)
- Don Giovanni – Wolfgang Amadeus Mozart, cond. Zubin Mehta, label: Helicon
- Italian Soprano Arias – London Symphony Orchestra, cond. Yves Abel, label: Naxos

== Awards and honors ==
- Asteroid 82463 Mluigiaborsi, discovered by Italian astronomers Luciano Tesi and Giuseppe Forti in 2001, was named in her honor. The official naming citation was published by the Minor Planet Center on 7 February 2012 (M.P.C. 78270).
