= Signor tenente =

Song by Giorgio Faletti

from the album Come un cartone animato
- Released: February 1994
- Length: 3:14
- Label: Adalpina Records
- Songwriter: Giorgio Faletti
- Producer: Danilo Amerio

Audio
- "Signor tenente" on YouTube

"Signor tenente" (lit. 'Sir Lieutenant') is a 1994 song by Giorgio Faletti.

== Overview ==
An anti-mafia rap song, "Signor tenente" was composed by Faletti in 1993, following the massacres of Capaci and Via D'Amelio and the Via dei Georgofili and Via Palestro bombings. Faletti was particularly touched by the death of the police escort agents in Capaci, mostly because of his friendship with several carabinieri agents of Villafranca d'Asti, whose barracks were opposite the recording studio where Faletti was recording his new album.

The song was Faletti's entry in 44th edition of the Sanremo Music Festival, replacing his initial choice "Se fossi una donna". Because of the rules in place at the time, Faletti was required to add a sung introduction to the song, since purely rap or spoken word songs were not allowed. The song made a powerful impression on audiences and critics alike, heightened by the fact that, up to that point, Faletti was known as a popular comedian, so his dramatic performance came as a real shock. Faletti eventually finished second behind Aleandro Baldi's "Passerà", and won the Critics Award.

In 2017, Marco Masini performed the song at the 67th Sanremo Music Festival, ranking third in the cover night competition. It was included as bonus track in his album Spostato di un secondo.

== Charts ==
Chart	Peak position
Italy (FIMI)	30
