= Andrea Bocelli =

Italian tenor (born 1958)

Andrea Bocelli OMRI
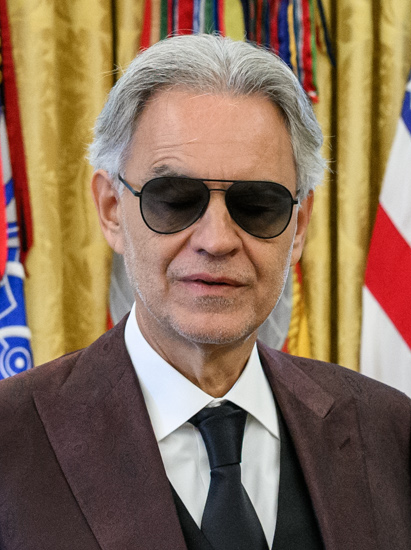
- Bocelli at the White House in Washington in 2025

Background information
- Born: 22 September 1958 (age 68); Lajatico, Tuscany, Italy
- Genres: Opera; operatic pop; Latin pop; classical; traditional pop; pop
- Occupation: Singer (tenor)
- Years active: 1992−present
- Labels: Polydor; Decca; Universal
- Spouse(s): Enrica Cenzatti (m. 1992; div. 2002) Veronica Berti (m. 2014)
- Website: andreabocelli.com

Andrea Bocelli (Italian: [anˈdrɛːa boˈtʃɛlli]; born 22 September 1958) is an Italian tenor. He rose to fame in 1994 after winning the newcomers' section of the 44th Sanremo Music Festival performing "Il mare calmo della sera".

Since 1994, Bocelli has recorded 15 solo studio albums of both pop and classical music, three greatest hits albums, and nine complete operas, selling over 90 million records worldwide. He has had success as a crossover performer, bringing classical music to the top of international pop charts. Bocelli's album Romanza is one of the best-selling albums of all time, while Sacred Arias is the biggest selling classical album by any solo artist in history. My Christmas was the best-selling holiday album of 2009 and one of the best-selling holiday albums in the United States. The 2019 album Sì debuted at number one on the UK Albums Chart and US Billboard 200, becoming Bocelli's first number-one album in both countries. His song "Con te partirò", a duet with Sarah Brightman taken from his second album Bocelli, is one of the best-selling singles of all time.

In 1998, Bocelli was named one of People magazine's 50 Most Beautiful People. He duetted with Celine Dion on the song "The Prayer" for the animated film Quest for Camelot, which won the Golden Globe Award for Best Original Song and was nominated for the Academy Award for Best Original Song. In 1999, Bocelli was nominated for Best New Artist at the Grammy Awards. He captured a listing in the Guinness Book of World Records with the release of his classical album Sacred Arias, as he simultaneously held the top three positions on the US Classical Albums charts.

Bocelli was made a Grand Officer of the Order of Merit of the Italian Republic in 2006, and was later elevated to Knight Grand Cross in 2025. He was honoured with a star on the Hollywood Walk of Fame on 2 March 2010 for his contribution to Live Theater, and Bocelli was awarded a gold medal for Merit in Serbia in 2022. Singer Celine Dion has said that "if God had a singing voice, it would sound a lot like Andrea Bocelli", and record producer David Foster has often described Bocelli's voice as the most beautiful in the world.

== Early life ==
Andrea Bocelli was born to Alessandro and Edi Bocelli on 22 September 1958. His sight was impaired from birth due to congenital glaucoma. He stated that his mother's decision to give birth to him and overrule the doctor's advice - to abort the pregnancy due to a high possibility of the child being born with a disability - was the inspiration for him to oppose abortion.

Bocelli grew up on his family's farm, with a younger brother Alberto, where they sold farm machinery and made wine in the small village of La Sterza, near Lajatico, Tuscany, Italy, about 40 km (25 mi) south of Pisa.

Bocelli showed a great passion for music as a young boy. His mother has said that music was the only thing that would comfort him. Bocelli started piano lessons at age six and later learned to play the flute, saxophone, trumpet, trombone, guitar, and drums. His nanny, Oriana, gave him the first record of Franco Corelli, and he began to show interest in pursuing the career of a tenor. By age seven, Bocelli was able to recognize the famous voices of the time and tried to emulate the great singers.

At age 12, Bocelli lost his vision completely after being hit in the eye with a football. Doctors resorted to leeches in a final attempt to save his sight, but they were unsuccessful and Bocelli remained blind.

Bocelli also spent time singing during his childhood. He gave his first concert in a small village not far from where he was born. Bocelli won his first song competition at age 14 with "'O sole mio" at the Margherita d'Oro in Viareggio. He finished secondary school in 1980, and then studied law at the University of Pisa. To earn money, Bocelli performed evenings in piano bars, and it was there that he met his future wife Enrica in 1987. Bocelli completed law school and spent one year as a court-appointed lawyer.

== Career ==
=== 1992–1994: Sanremo and Il mare calmo della sera ===
In 1992, Italian rock star Zucchero held auditions for tenors to make a demo tape of his song "Miserere", to send to Italian tenor Luciano Pavarotti. After hearing Bocelli on tape, Pavarotti urged Zucchero to use Bocelli instead of him. Pavarotti eventually persuaded Zucchero to record the song with Bocelli, and it became a hit throughout Europe. During Zucchero's European concert tour in 1993, Bocelli accompanied him to sing the duet, and he was also given solo sets in the concerts, singing "Nessun dorma" from Giacomo Puccini's opera Turandot. Bocelli signed with the Sugar Music label in Milan after Caterina Caselli heard him sing "Miserere" and "Nessun Dorma" at a birthday party for Zucchero.

In December, Bocelli entered the preliminary round of the Sanremo Music Festival in the category of Giovani, performing "Miserere". He won the preliminary competition with the highest marks ever recorded in the newcomers' section. On 28 December, Bocelli debuted in the classical world in a concert at the Teatro Romolo Valli in Reggio Emilia. In February 1994, he entered the main Sanremo Festival competition with "Il mare calmo della sera", and he won the newcomers section, again with a record score. Following his win, Bocelli released his debut album of the same name in April, and it entered the Italian Top Ten, being certified platinum within weeks.

In May 1994, Bocelli toured with pop singer Gerardina Trovato. Four months later, he sang at Pavarotti's annual Charity Gala concert, Pavarotti International in Modena, where Bocelli sang Ruggiero Leoncavallo's "Mattinata" and sang a duet with Pavarotti, Maurizio Morante's "Notte e Piscatore". That same month, Bocelli made his opera debut as Macduff in Verdi's Macbeth at the Teatro Verdi in Pisa. He had been an agnostic, but around 1994, partly as a result of immersing himself in the works of Russian author Leo Tolstoy, Bocelli returned to the practice of the Catholic faith. He performed the hymn "Adeste Fideles" in Rome before Pope John Paul II in St. Peter's Basilica at Christmas.

=== 1995–1997: Bocelli and Romanza ===
As winner of the newcomers' section at the 1994 Sanremo Festival, Bocelli was invited to return the following year. He entered the main competition with "Con te partirò" and finished in fourth place. The song was included on Bocelli's second album, Bocelli, produced by Mauro Malavasi and released in November 1995. In Belgium, "Con te partirò" became the best-selling single of all time.

Bocelli's third album, Viaggio Italiano, was released in Italy in 1996. He was invited to sing a duet with English soprano Sarah Brightman at the final bout of German boxer Henry Maske. Brightman approached Bocelli after she heard him singing "Con te partirò" while she was dining in a restaurant. Changing the title lyric of the song to "Time to Say Goodbye", they re-recorded it as a duet with members of the London Symphony Orchestra and sang it as a farewell for Maske. The single debuted atop the German charts, where it stayed for 14 weeks. With sales nearing three million copies, and a sextuple platinum award, "Time to Say Goodbye" eclipsed the previous best-selling single by more than one million copies. In 1996, Bocelli topped the Spanish singles chart with a duet with Marta Sánchez, "Vivo por ella", the Spanish version of "Vivo per lei", recorded with Giorgia for his 1997 compilation album, Romanza. He also recorded a Portuguese version of the song with Brazilian singer Sandy.

The same year, Bocelli recorded "Je vis pour elle", the French version of "Vivo per lei", as a duet with French singer Hélène Ségara. Released in December 1997, the song became a hit in Belgium (Wallonia) and France, where it reached No. 1 on the charts. To date, it is the best-selling single for Ségara, and the second for Bocelli after "Time to Say Goodbye". On 3 March, he appeared in Hamburg, Germany, with Sarah Brightman to receive the ECHO music award for "Best Single of the Year".

During the summer of 1997, Bocelli gave 22 open-air concerts in Germany, and an indoor concert in Oberhausen on 31 August. In September, he performed in concert at the Piazza dei Cavalieri in Pisa for the home video A Night in Tuscany (Italian: una notte nella Toscana) with guests Nuccia Focile, Sarah Brightman and Zucchero. The concert was also Bocelli's first concert to air on PBS, as part of the In The Spotlight series. It also marked Bocelli's debut to American audiences. On 14 September, in Munich, Germany, he received an ECHO Klassik Best Seller of the Year award for his album, Viaggio Italiano.

Back in Italy in Bologna on 27 September, Bocelli sang at the International Eucharistic Congress. On 19 October, he sang at the TeleFood benefit concert held in the Vatican City to raise awareness about world hunger. Six days later, Bocelli received a Bambi Award in the Klassik category in Cologne, Germany.

=== 1998–1999: Aria: The Opera Album, Sogno and Sacred Arias ===
Bocelli made his debut in a major operatic role in 1998 when he played Rodolfo in a production of La bohème at the Teatro Comunale in Cagliari from 18 to 25 February. His fifth album Aria: The Opera Album was released in March.

On 19 April, Bocelli made his United States debut with a concert at the John F. Kennedy Center for the Performing Arts in Washington, D.C., followed the next day by a reception at the White House with then US President Bill Clinton. On 5 May, Bocelli appeared in Monte Carlo, winning two World Music Awards, one in the category "Best Italian Singer", and one for "Best Classical Interpretation". He was also named one of People magazine's 50 Most Beautiful People of 1998.

From June to August, Bocelli toured North and South America. In September, he received his second Echo Klassik award, this time for Best Selling Classical Album with Aria: The Opera Album. On Thanksgiving Eve, Bocelli was a guest on Céline Dion's television special These Are Special Times in which he joined Dion to sing "The Prayer" and he also sang "Ave Maria" solo. The duet was included on Dion's album These Are Special Times (1998) and was re-issued with the DVD of the TV special in 2007. The song also appeared on the Quest for Camelot soundtrack in 1998 and on Bocelli's album, Sogno, the following year.

In the New Year, Bocelli performed two concerts at the Bellagio hotel in Las Vegas. At the 56th Golden Globe Awards held on 24 January, "The Prayer" won the Golden Globe Award for Best Original Song from the film Quest for Camelot. At the 41st Grammy Awards ceremony on 24 February, Bocelli was nominated for Best New Artist, which was won by Lauryn Hill. Bocelli and Dion sang "The Prayer" at the ceremony. The song was also nominated for an Academy Award for Best Original Song and performed by Bocelli and Dion at the ceremony held at the Los Angeles Music Center on 21 March.

From 11 to 24 April, Bocelli toured the West Coast of North America, from San Diego to Vancouver, with a final performance at the Hollywood Bowl in Los Angeles. Actress Elizabeth Taylor stood by his side on the stage during the encore, while he sang "The Prayer". At the invitation of Steven Spielberg, Bocelli sang in Los Angeles on 15 May before Bill Clinton at an event on behalf of the Democratic Party. At the end of May, he toured Portugal and Spain and sang with Portuguese Fado singer Dulce Pontes. On 27 June, Bocelli took part in the Michael Jackson benefit concert for suffering children in Munich's Olympic Stadium.

From 10 July to 27 August, Bocelli appeared in a guest role for seven performances of The Merry Widow at the Verona Arena. As the "Tenor Conte Andrea" he performed three arias: "La donna è mobile" from Verdi's Rigoletto; "Tu, che m' hai preso il cuor" from Franz Lehár's Das Land Des Laechelns and "Libiamo ne' lieti calici" from Verdi's La traviata. On 10 September, together with soprano Daniela Dessì and two Polish singers, Bocelli performed at the Grand Theatre of Łódź in Poland. From 7 October to 19 November, he made his United States operatic debut in Jules Massenet's Werther at the Detroit Opera House with the Michigan Opera Theater.

Bocelli also performed at Rodeo Drive in Beverly Hills and gave further concerts in Detroit, Cleveland and Chicago, and made an appearance on Jay Leno's first instalment of The Tonight Show. Mayor of New York City Rudy Giuliani then gave Bocelli the Crystal Apple award. His seventh album Sacred Arias, which contains exclusively sacred music, was released worldwide on 8 November, and two weeks later, it reached number one on the US Classic Billboard charts – making Bocelli the first vocalist to hold all top three places on the chart, with Aria, the opera album in second place, and Viaggio Italiano in third place. The album also included the hymn of the Holy Year 2000, which was chosen as the official version by the Vatican in October. To promote Sacred Arias, Bocelli recorded his second PBS concert in 1999 at the Roman church of Santa Maria sopra Minerva in Rome, singing most of the songs from the album. The special was nominated for an Emmy Award for Outstanding Classical Music-Dance Program during the 52nd Primetime Emmy Awards.

In Italy, Bocelli sang in Florence at a meeting of the center-left Heads of State. Invited by Queen Elizabeth II, he performed at the annual Royal Variety Performance in Birmingham, UK, on 29 November. The next day, Bocelli's book La musica del silenzio, an autobiographical novel, was released in Italy, and in 2017, it was turned into a movie as The Music of Silence, directed by Michael Radford. From 12 to 21 December, he performed six concerts in Barcelona, Strasbourg, Lisbon, Zagreb, Budapest and Messina, some of which were broadcast on local television. Bocelli also performed on German television; Wetten, dass..? on 11 December and the José Carreras Gala in Leipzig on 17 December. On 31 December, he finished a marathon of 24 concerts in 30 days, with a concert at the Nassau Veterans Memorial Coliseum in New York, welcoming in the new millennium.

=== 2000–2001: Verdi and Cieli di Toscana ===
At the 42nd Grammy Awards, Bocelli was nominated twice. "The Prayer" was nominated for Best Pop Collaboration with Vocals and for Best Male Pop Vocal Performance. Bocelli performed it with Dion at the ceremony. His "World Tour 2000" started on 31 March. In May, his Sacred Arias album was voted album of the year by listeners of the Classic FM radio station in the UK. Bocelli's world tour continued from 12 to 14 May with four concerts in Japan and South Korea. At the end of the UEFA European Football Championship, he performed with Valery Gergiev and Renée Fleming at a concert on the River Maas in Rotterdam. On 6 July, Bocelli performed at New York City's Statue of Liberty for his third PBS special American Dream: Andrea Bocelli's Statue Of Liberty Concert. The concert was a dedication to his father, who died at the beginning of 2000. Bocelli was accompanied by the New Jersey Symphony Orchestra under the direction of Maestro Steven Mercurio with special guest Soprano Ana Maria Martinez and a surprise appearance by Sarah Brightman to sing with Bocelli on "Time to Say Goodbye". For the final encore, Bocelli dedicated "Sogno" to his late father. On 17 August, Bocelli performed in Giuseppe Verdi's Messa da Requiem at the Verona Arena in Rome.

Bocelli's seventh album, Verdi, was released on 11 September. In September, he performed three concerts in Australia. Bocelli received another Echo Klassik award for "Bestseller of the year" for Sacred Arias. In November, his first complete opera recording, La Bohème, was released. The following month, Bocelli received another award in Germany, the Goldene Europa for classical music.

In January 2001, Bocelli portrayed the main character in Mascagni's opera L'amico Fritz at the Teatro Filarmonico in Verona and again performed the tenor part in Verdi's Requiem. On 19 March, the Requiem album was released with Bocelli as tenor. From 22 March to 6 April, he toured North America accompanied by Cecilia Gasdia and the Hartford Symphony Orchestra. On 17 June, Bocelli performed at the re-opening of the Leaning Tower of Pisa. In July, he performed two concerts in Dublin with Ana María Martínez and the New Symphony Orchestra. At the Scuola Grande di San Rocco in Venice on 4 October, Bocelli presented his new album Cieli di Toscana and was recognized for having sold more than 40 million albums worldwide. In October, he opened the celebrations of the 200th anniversary of the birth of Sicilian opera composer Vincenzo Bellini in Catania. On 28 October, Bocelli sang Franz Schubert's Ellens dritter Gesang (also known as "Ave Maria", Latin for "Hail Mary") as a representative of the Catholic faith, during a memorial concert at Ground Zero in New York City for the victims of the September 11 attacks there. In November, he received the Platinum Europe Award for one million sales of the album Cieli di Toscana, and at the Italian Music Awards, Bocelli was given a special award from the Federation of the Italian Music Industry for his merits as an "Ambassador of Italian music in the world". He performed seven more concerts in the US accompanied by Ana María Martínez, and on 23 December, Bocelli sang the Italian national anthem as well as works of Bellini and Verdi at the traditional Christmas concert in the Italian Senate, which was broadcast live on television for the first time.

=== 2002–2005: Sentimento and Andrea ===
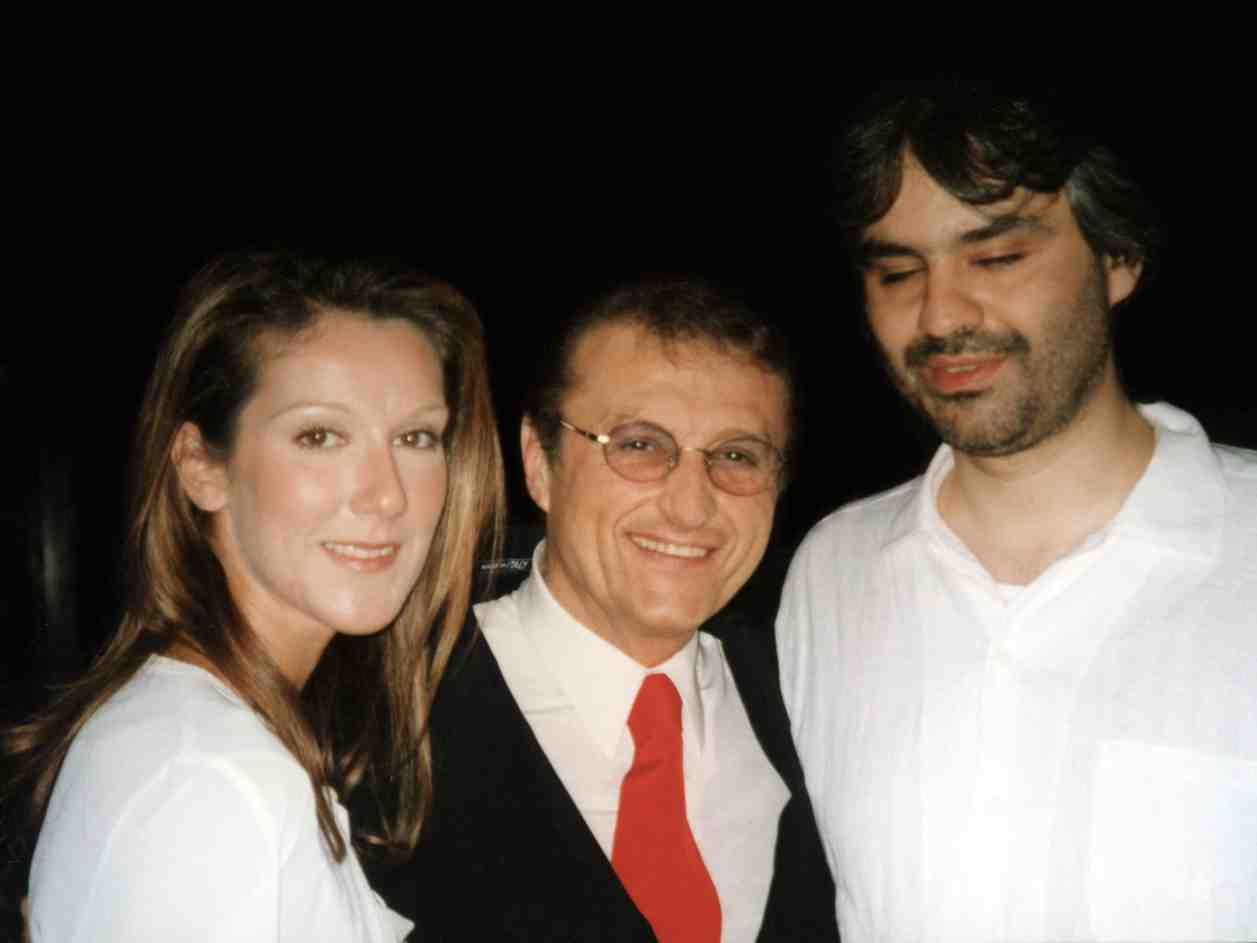
Bocelli with Celine Dion and Tony Renis in 2002

In Berlin, Bocelli received a Goldene Kamera award in the "Music & Entertainment" category on 5 February. On 6 March, he received two World Music Awards in Monte Carlo: "World best selling classical artist" and "Best selling Italian artist". Five days later, Bocelli gave a concert for peace at the Basilica di San Marco a Venezia in Venice, accompanied by the orchestra of the Teatro La Fenice and conducted by Lorin Maazel. On 15 March, he took part in the opening of Walt Disney Studios Park in Marne-la-Vallée France. On 7 May, Bocelli and Tony Renis received a Telegatto Italian Television award for the soundtrack of the series Cuore. A few weeks later on 23 May, he received the 2002 Classical BRIT Award for "Outstanding Contribution to Music". On 27 May, Bocelli performed at the Villa Madama in Rome in front of US president George W. Bush and Italian president Silvio Berlusconi. The next day, he took part in "Pavarotti & Friends" charity concert in Modena in aid of Angola. In June, Bocelli again toured the US, then on 26 July and 3 August, he portrayed Lieutenant B.F. Pinkerton in Madama Butterfly at the 48th Puccini Festival in Torre del Lago. On 14 October, Bocelli and Lorin Maazel presented his new album Sentimento to a worldwide audience. Further presentations took place in Milan and New York, and the album was released on 4 November, selling over two million copies in 40 days. On 24 October, Bocelli started his Sentimento tour in Zürich; the tour took in large arenas in several European and North American cities.

In February 2003, Bocelli performed Madama Butterfly in an exclusive Monte Carlo concert, which was attended by Caroline, Princess of Hanover. The following month, he appeared as a producer for the first time at the Sanremo Festival, where the young artists Allunati and Jacqueline Ferry sang for his new record label, Clacksong. In May, Bocelli's second complete opera, Tosca, was released. However, it did not attract unanimous praise. Andreas Dorschel notices "monochrome timbre" and "little dynamic variability" in Bocelli's performance: "Whatever is suffered by Cavaradossi − torture for instance or the prospect of execution −: Bocelli does not seem to register it, but goes on in the musical equivalent of Stoic indifference." At a private benefit gala for the Royal National Institute of Blind People, Bocelli sang in front of the British royal family. The next day, he received two awards for Sentimento at the 2003 Classical BRIT Award held at the Royal Albert Hall in London – "Best selling classical album" and "Album of the year". On 24 May, Bocelli performed in a benefit concert for the Arpa Foundation for Film, Music and Art in the Piazza del Campo in Siena, with sopranos Maria Luigia Borsi and Lucia Dessanti, baritone Soo Kyung Ahn, and violinist Ruth Rogers, accompanied by Marcello Rota and the Orchestra Città di Pisa. Three days later, he was again invited to perform at "Pavarotti & Friends" in Modena and sang a medley of Neapolitan songs together with Pavarotti. In June, Bocelli continued his Sentimento tour in Athens and Cyprus. In September, Bocelli took part in a concert for the Justice ministers and Interior ministers of the European Union at the Parco della Musica in Rome. He then resumed his tour, accompanied by Maria Luigia Borsi, Ruth Rogers and Marcello Rota.

Bocelli won the "Favourite Specialist Performer" award at the UK National Music Awards in October 2003. The following month, he once again toured in the United States, this time accompanied by Ana Maria Martinez, Kallen Esperian and Steven Mercurio. In December, Bocelli gave his first concert in China and at the end of the month, sang Gounod's Ave Maria at Pavarotti's wedding in Modena. In Bologna in January 2004, he performed as Werther in four performances of the opera of the same name. In April and May, Bocelli toured Asia again, visiting Manila, Hong Kong and Singapore. In May, he took part in a concert at Circo Massimo in Rome organised by Quincy Jones to launch the "We are the Future" project. In June, Bocelli's third complete opera Il trovatore was released. The following month, he played the part of Mario Cavaradossi in Tosca at the 50th Puccini Festival in Torre del Lago, and he took part in the International Olympic Committee (IOC) global campaign for the 2004 Summer Olympics in Athens.

During early 2005, Bocelli was on tour including performances in Madeira, Hungary, Norway, the US, the UK, Italy and Germany. He also appeared in Sesame Street singing "Time to Say Goodnight", a parody of "Time to Say Goodbye", as a lullaby to Elmo. On 21 March, Bocelli performed at the Music for Asia benefit concert in Rome, televised on Italia 1, in aid of the 2004 Indian Ocean earthquake appeal. A few months later, he performed at the Deutsche Opera in Berlin. On 2 July, Bocelli performed at the Paris concert as part of the Live 8 event. Also during the second part of the year, he performed in Croatia, Serbia, Italy, the US, Dubai, Switzerland and finally in Scandinavia. On 28 August, Bocelli performed at the Faenol Festival held in Vaynol, Wales and organised by Welsh bass-baritone Bryn Terfel. In December, his first contemporary music concert took place at a Lake Las Vegas village resort in Nevada, US, which was recorded for PBS and released as the Under the Desert Sky DVD. Bocelli also took part in the Royal Christmas Show, which took place in several cities in the US in December. The album Werther was released in December.

=== 2006–2007: Amore and Vivere, Greatest hits ===
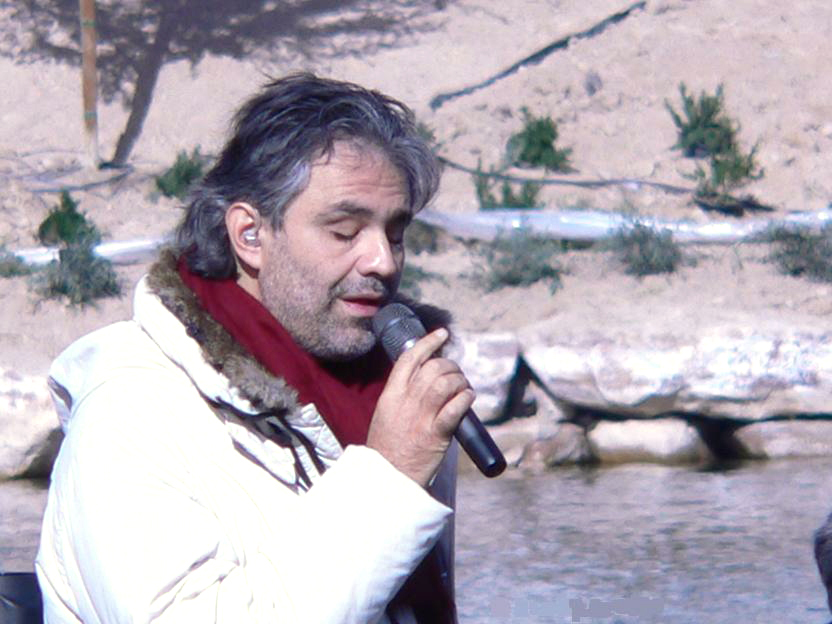
Bocelli rehearsing for his Under the Desert Sky concert in Lake Las Vegas, 2006

On 18 February, Bocelli sang at the Toyota Center in Houston during the National Basketball Association's (NBA) 2006 All-Star Weekend, and broadcast live on the TNT Cable television network.

On 26 February, Bocelli sang "Because We Believe" from his Amore album in the Carnevale section of the closing ceremony of the Torino Olympics. He also began another tour with a concert at the Piazza di Castello in Turin. In March, Bocelli was honoured by the Italian state with a Grande Ufficiale Italian Order of Merit (Grand Officer of the Italian Republic), given to him by then President of the Italian Republic, Carlo Azeglio Ciampi. The award was presented to him at the Sanremo Festival, where Bocelli performed a duet with American singer Christina Aguilera on 4 March.

From 31 March to 2 April, Bocelli took part in the Maggio Musicale in Florence, where he sang the Canto di pace (Canto of peace) by Marco Tutino and the tenor part from Gioachino Rossini's Messa di Gloria, and in Naples where he took part in Rossini's Petite messe solennelle.

In April 2006, Bocelli featured as a guest coach on American Idol, helping the finalists sing the week's themed songs, "Greatest Love Songs". He also performed on that week's results show. American Idol runner-up Katharine McPhee performed at three of Bocelli's concerts in California from 9 to 11 June, singing duets of Somos Novios and The Prayer with Bocelli. They also performed on J. C. Penney Jam: The Concert for America's Kids and recorded duet versions of Somos Novios for the resulting album, and also Can't Help Falling in Love on the CD of the Under the Desert Sky DVD.

In June, Bocelli sang the Italian duet version of "Because We Believe", "Ama, credi e vai", with Gianna Nannini at the "großen Fan Party" at the opening of the 2006 FIFA World Cup, in Berlin in front of billions of worldwide television viewers.

On 1 July 2007, Bocelli performed "The Music of the Night" from Andrew Lloyd Webber's The Phantom of the Opera, in a special musicals medley during the Concert for Diana at Wembley Stadium in London, England. Four days later, Bocelli returned to his hometown for a concert at the newly created Teatro del Silenzio in Lajatico, with guest appearances by Kenny G, Heather Headley, Lang Lang, Elisa, Sarah Brightman and Laura Pausini. The concert was later released as Vivere Live in Tuscany. In September, Bocelli debuted at the Avery Fisher Hall, in New York, with four concerts. October saw the release of the opera album of Ruggiero Leoncavallo's Pagliacci with Bocelli singing the role of Canio. In November, he won the "Best Italian Artist" and "World's Best-selling Classical Artist" awards at the World Music Awards. The following month, Bocelli finished his 2006 tour with more concerts in North America and Europe.

Bocelli and Sarah Brightman's duet version of "Con te partirò" was used in the 2007 film Blades of Glory, as an ice skating song. K-1 mixed martial arts fighter Yoshihiro Akiyama started using "Con te partirò" as his ring entrance music. On 8 September, Bocelli sang an arrangement of Mozart's Ave verum corpus at the funeral of Luciano Pavarotti in Modena, Italy.

On 21 October 2007, Bocelli sang "Con te partirò" on the UK television series Strictly Come Dancing results show, and nine days later, he sang "The Prayer" during an ITV Special An Audience with Céline Dion. The show was broadcast on 23 December. Alongside fellow Italian singer Laura Pausini, he sang Vive Ya during the 2007 Latin Grammy Awards. The song, originally released in 1997 as a duet in Italian between Bocelli and Italian singer-songwriter Trovatto on Bocelli's Romanza, was also released in English on his 2007 album, The Best of Andrea Bocelli: Vivere, as Dare to Live. The album, Vivere, sold over 3 million copies.

=== 2008: Incanto and Carmen ===
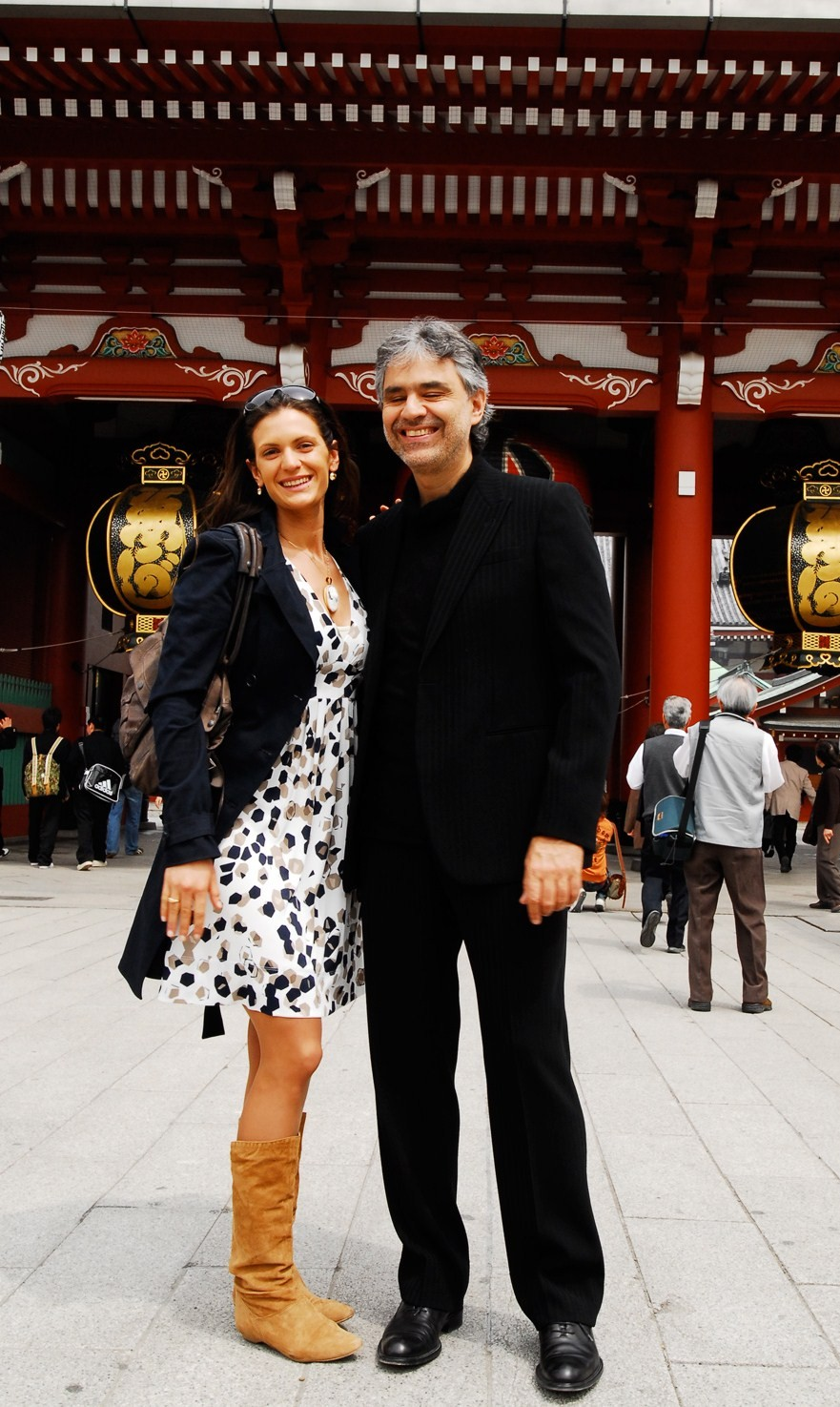
Bocelli with his then fiancée Veronica Berti in Tokyo, Japan, during his 2008 Asian Tour

On 20 January 2008, Bocelli received the Italian TV award Telegatto in platinum for Italian music in the world, in Rome. He sang "La voce del silenzio" – "The voice of silence" – and "Dare to Live" during the ceremony. To promote the album, Bocelli performed "Canto della Terra" at The Alan Titchmarsh Show on the BBC in London on 1 February and was interviewed by Fabio Fazio on the Italian talk show Che tempo che fa on RAI 3 in Italy; and performed "Canto della terra", "A te" and "Besame mucho" from the album, as well as "My Way" on 2 February; and made an appearance on The South Bank Show in London, where he sang the French aria "Pour mon âme" on 3 February. Then, on 10 February, Bocelli performed "The Prayer" at the 50th Grammy Awards, held in Los Angeles, with Josh Groban in a tribute to Luciano Pavarotti, and sang "Dare to Live" with Heather Headley the following day on The Tonight Show with Jay Leno. In April, Bocelli toured in Asia with performances in Tokyo, Taichung, and Seoul.

On 7 May 2008, Bocelli sang at Steel Aréna in Košice, Slovakia, in front of 8,000 people. Six days later, he sang at the "Teatro delle Muse" in Ancona, Italy, for a charity concert for "Francesca Rava – N.P.H. Italia Onlus", a foundation that helps poor and disabled children around the world. On 23 May, he sang The Prayer with Katharine McPhee in a Las Vegas tribute concert for Canadian producer and songwriter David Foster. Bocelli later praised Filipina teenage singer Charice, whom he first heard perform at that concert. On 2 June, Bocelli performed at the Piazza del Duomo, Milan in front of 80,000 people during a concert celebrating the anniversary of the Republic of Italy's formation.

From 17 to 28 June, Bocelli played the role of Don José on stage, opposite Hungarian mezzo-soprano Ildikó Komlósi as Carmen, in Georges Bizet's opera at the Teatro dell'Opera di Roma, in Rome, for four nights. Bocelli released the complete opera recording of Carmen in Italy that same year, which he recorded in 2005. Myung-whun Chung conducted the Orchestre Philharmonique de Radio France and the Chœur de Radio France for the recording, and Welsh Bass-baritone Bryn Terfel, was part of the Ensemble. The recording was not released internationally, until March 2010. Carmen: Duets & Arias, a single-disc collection of some of the arias and duets of the recording, was also released in 2010.

On 20 July, Bocelli held his third concert at the Teatro del Silenzio in Lajatico, his hometown. The concert was a tribute to the cinema of Italy. Its performers included Italian composer and musician Nicola Piovani, Italian ballet dancer Roberto Bolle, Israeli singer Noa, and Charice. A week and a half later on 31 July, Bocelli performed at a concert in Vingis Park in Vilnius, Lithuania, in front of more than 18,000 people. Australian singer Tina Arena performed two duets with Bocelli – "Canto Della Terra" and "The Prayer" – at the closing stages of the concert. On 7 August, he held a benefit concert at Medjugorje, Bosnia Herzegovina, and was accompanied by the Czech National Symphony Orchestra. Then, during the rest of August, Bocelli was on tour in Australia and New Zealand for the third time. Tina Arena performed with him in all five concerts during the tour. On 26 September, during the 2008 Veneto Festival, Bocelli held a concert in the Church of the Eremitani in Padua, Italy. He was accompanied by the I Solisti Veneti orchestra, celebrating its 50th birthday and conducted by Claudio Scimone, and by the Wiener Singakademie choir. The concert was a celebration of Giacomo Puccini's 150th birthday.

On 10 and 11 October, Bocelli performed at Petra, singing "Dare to Live" with Laura Pausini, as well as performing "E Lucevan le Stelle" from Tosca. On 19 October, he sang "'O surdato 'nnammurato" and a duet of "Non Ti Scordar Di Me" with Cecilia Bartoli, both from the Incanto album, during the ECHO Awards in Germany; and later presented the soprano with an ECHO award. Five days later, Bocelli performed at Piazza del Plebiscito in Naples, as a tribute to the city, where he celebrated the Italian release of Incanto. Performing with Bocelli were flautist Andrea Griminelli, Italian pop singer Massimo Ranieri and soprano Cecilia Bartoli, with Steven Mercurio conducting the Czech National Symphony Orchestra. On 31 October, he performed a solo version of "The Prayer", as well as "Because", a song from Incanto, live on The Oprah Winfrey Show.

On 21 and 22 November, Bocelli was amongst a quartet of soloists (soprano Sabina Cvilak, mezzo-soprano Kate Aldrich and bass Alexander Vinogradov) to sing Rossini's Petite messe solennelle, conducted by Plácido Domingo, at the Washington National Opera in Washington, D.C. Bocelli sang twice in the piece and later the two tenors sang "The Pearl Fishers' Duet" which would be the first aria they had ever sung together. On 25 and 26 November, he starred alongside soprano Verónica Villarroel in an opera in concert of Mascagni's Cavalleria rusticana at the "Municipal Auditorium" in San Antonio, Texas. Bocelli later held a concert at "Atrio de la Catedral" in Campeche, Mexico, on 28 November, where he sang songs from Incanto as well as some of his Spanish hits, including Bésame Mucho, Somos Novios, Amapola and Por ti Volare – the Spanish version of Con te Partiro.

=== 2009: My Christmas, first holiday album ===
On 27 May 2009, Bocelli sang "Il Gladiatore", from the Gladiator soundtrack, followed by the UEFA Champions League Anthem, which is based on G.F. Handel's "Zadok the Priest", during the opening ceremony of the 2009 UEFA Champions League Final, in the Stadio Olimpico, in Rome.

On 3 November, My Christmas, his first Holiday album, produced by David Foster, was released and went on to become the best-selling Holiday album of the year.

The Andrea Bocelli & David Foster Christmas Special, the PBS special of the album, first aired on Thanksgiving night in the United States, and continued to be broadcast in the United States and Canada throughout December. In late November, the program was broadcast in Mexico and in the UK and Ireland; it later aired on 15 and 25 December, on Italia 1, in Italy, 19 December, on TVE2 and TROS, in Spain and the Netherlands, and Christmas Eve, on vtm and RTL-TVI, in Belgium and Luxembourg.

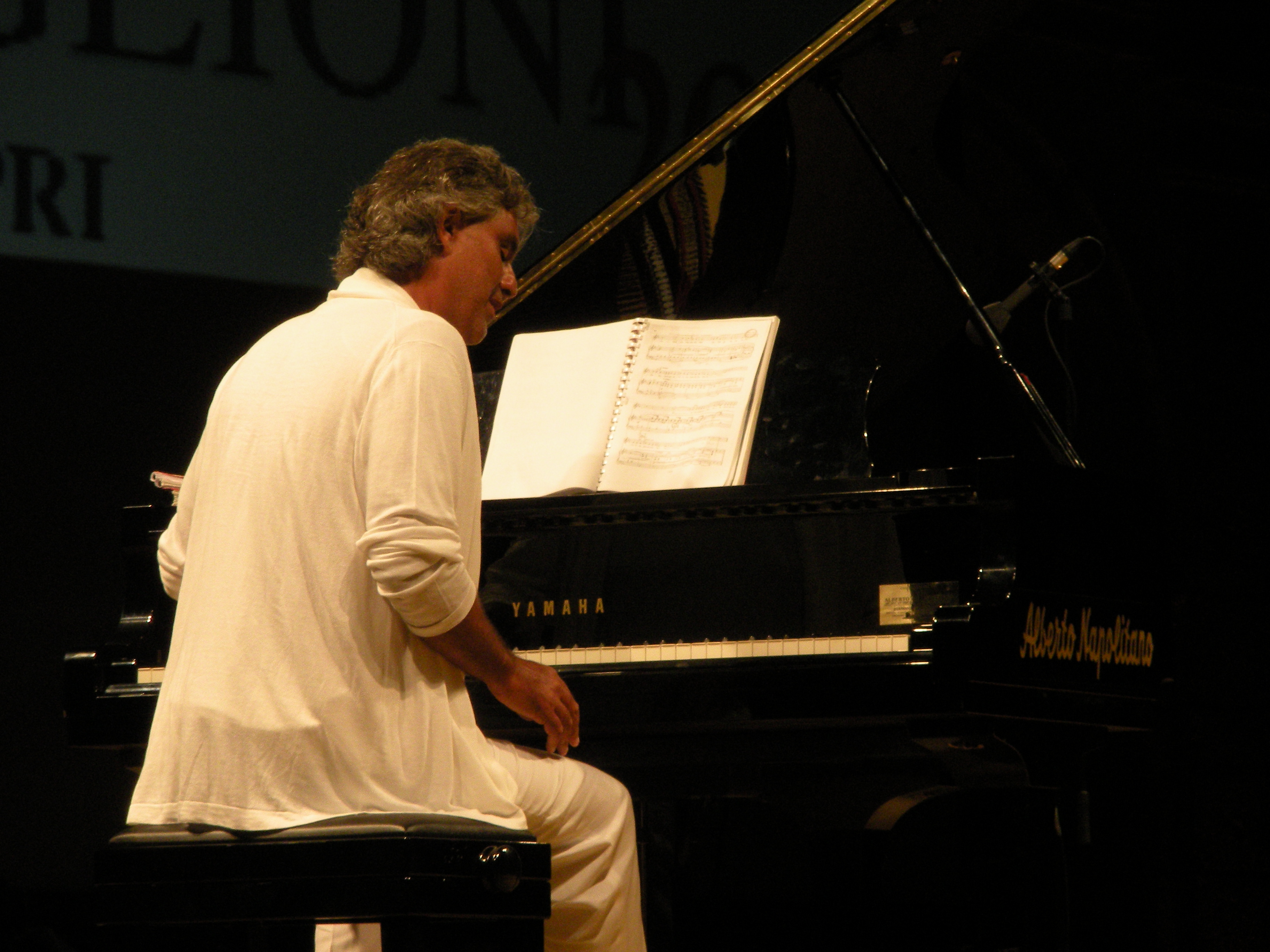
Bocelli performing at the Premio Faraglioni in 2009

On 3 November, during the World Premiere of Disney's A Christmas Carol, in Leicester Square, London, following the switching on of the annual Oxford Street and Regent Street Christmas lights, Bocelli led the St Paul's Cathedral Choir, and more than 14,000 people across the capital, as they broke the Official Guinness World Record for the biggest ever Christmas carol sing-along, singing "Silent Night". He completed his performance in Leicester Square with, "God Bless Us Everyone", the closing song of the movie, which he provided the vocals for in English, Italian and Spanish. Bocelli returned to the United Kingdom on 16 December for an appearance on The One Show, broadcast live by BBC One, and on The Alan Titchmarsh Show which aired 18 December, on ITV1.

On 21 November, a segment of Leute Heute, a German tabloid-program on ZDF, was about My Christmas and Bocelli's meeting in Rome with Pope Benedict XVI and 250 other artists, an event which was broadcast live earlier that day in Italy, by Rai Uno. Bocelli was also joined by the Piccolo Coro dell'Antoniano, in his home in Forte dei Marmi, where they sang "Caro Gesù Bambino", a song from My Christmas that was originally recorded by the choir in 1960. Rai Uno also broadcast the performance later that day, during the Zecchino d'Oro Festival. The following day, Bocelli was among Fabio Fazio's guests on his popular Italian talk-show, Che tempo che fa, broadcast on Rai Tre. During the program, Bocelli talked about his album and performed "The Lord's Prayer", "White Christmas", and "Silent Night". It was also announced that Bocelli would return to the show on 20 December and give a live concert of My Christmas. He also took part in the annual 2009 José Carreras Gala on 17 December, where he sang Adeste Fideles, before singing "White Christmas" with José Carreras for the first time; this was broadcast live by Das Erste in Germany. Bocelli then returned to Italy for a concert in the Upper Basilica of San Francesco d'Assisi on 19 December, which was broadcast directly after the Urbi et Orbi blessing of Pope Benedict XVI, 25 December, on Rai Uno.

In North America, Bocelli gave six concerts. On 28 November, he performed in the BankAtlantic Center in Ft. Lauderdale, Florida. Bocelli later performed in the Air Canada Centre in Toronto, Ontario, Canada; in the Izod Center in East Rutherford, New Jersey; in the William Saroyan Theatre in Fresno, California (changed from the much larger Save Mart Center due to scheduling conflicts); in the MGM Grand in Las Vegas; and finally in the Honda Center in Anaheim, California, on 3, 5, 8, 12, and 13 December. Bocelli's last three arena concerts alone grossed a total of more than $5.6 million, placing him third on Billboard Magazine week's Hot Tours ranking, behind the Trans-Siberian Orchestra and Il Divo, who both held over five times more concerts worldwide, compared to Bocelli's three in the United States, explaining their better showings.

In the United States, Bocelli made a number of high-profile TV appearances. He first performed "White Christmas" at the 83rd annual Macy's Thanksgiving Day Parade, broadcast live on NBC, 26 November. Bocelli performed the song again four days later during The Today Show, also live. His appearance on The Oprah Winfrey Show during her Holiday Music Extravaganza, where Bocelli sang "What Child Is This" with Mary J. Blige and later closed the show with Adeste Fideles, was also aired the same day; it was rebroadcast on 23 December. Bocelli also sang "Adeste Fideles" and was interviewed by Barbara Walters and Joy Behar on The View, which aired on 2 December on ABC. Six days later, he performed "Jingle Bells" with The Muppets on The Jay Leno Show. Bocelli also performed a number of songs from the album, including "The Christmas Song" with Natalie Cole, during a dinner at David Foster's mansion in Malibu, which was featured on The Dr. Phil Show, on 10 December. Bocelli also performed "White Christmas" and "Silent Night" on the Larry King Live and Fox & Friends holiday specials, broadcast on 23 December on CNN, and 19, 24, and 25 December on Fox News.

In Brazil, following the success of the South American leg of the Incanto tour, where more than 100,000 people attended his free concert at São Paulo's "Parque Indipendencia" earlier in the year, it was announced that Bocelli would hold another Open-Air free concert in Florianópolis on 28 December, where a crowd of about a million people was expected to attend. However, due to financial and political reasons, the concert was later cancelled on short notice, along with all the other events scheduled for Christmas in the city.

=== 2010: Hollywood Walk of Fame and FIFA World Cup ===
On 31 January 2010, during the 52nd Grammy Awards, Bocelli, Mary J. Blige and David Foster joined forces again, singing "Bridge over Troubled Water" as a tribute to the victims of that year's earthquake in Haiti. On 2 March, he was honoured with a star on the Hollywood Walk of Fame for his contribution to Live Theater, at 7000 Hollywood Boulevard, in front of the Roosevelt Hotel. The previous day, Bocelli, along with David Foster, were honoured by L.A. Italia Film, Fashion and Art Fest during a ceremony at the Grauman's Chinese Theatre, in Hollywood, where The Story Behind The Voice, a documentary about Bocelli's life and career was shown.

On 12 March, Bocelli made an appearance on Skavlan, in Oslo, Norway, to promote his upcoming Scandinavian tour, giving a rare interview to the show's host Fredrik Skavlan, and later performing "Voglio Vivere Cosi", from his 2008 album Incanto, with Norwegian Boys' choir, Sølvguttene. Bocelli returned to Scandinavia for a concert in Telenor Arena in Bærum, Norway, on 8 April, a concert in Forum Copenhagen in Copenhagen, Denmark, on 9 April, and finally a concert in the Ericsson Globe, in Stockholm, Sweden, on 11 April. He was joined by Heather Headley and 120 musicians from the Stockholm Concert Orchestra, in all three concerts, and by Swedish mezzo-soprano Malena Ernman in his Swedish concert.

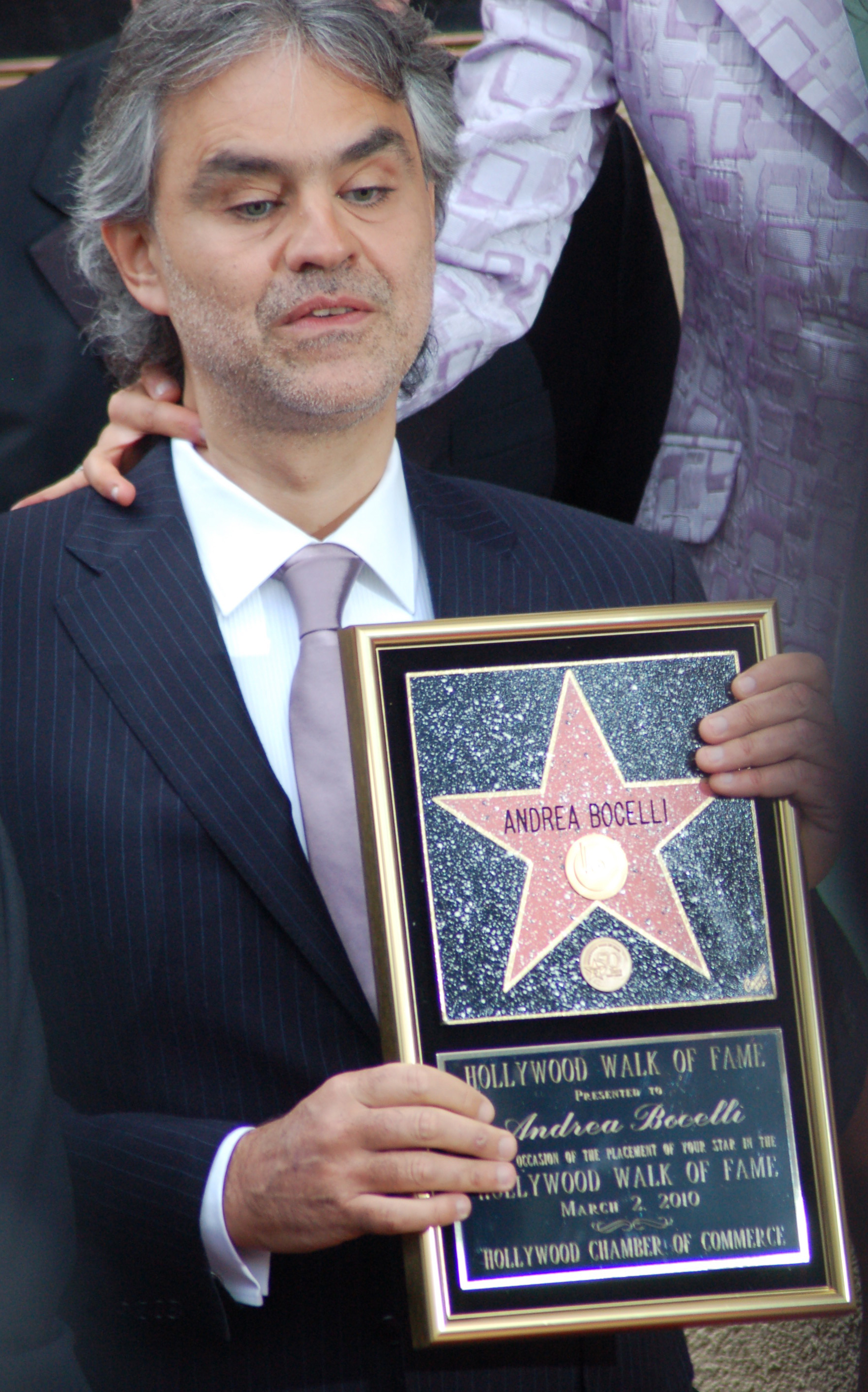
Bocelli receiving a star on the Hollywood Walk of Fame, 2010

On 30 April, Bocelli sang "Nessun dorma" during the opening ceremony of the Expo 2010, in Shanghai, China. The next day, he held a concert, titled Charming China, at Shanghai Stadium. The concert was later broadcast by Shanghai TV, and by CCTV Channels throughout mainland China.

The two appearances coincided with Bocelli's Asian tour, consisting of a concert in Budokan, Tokyo, Japan, on 28 April, a concert in Jamsil Gymnasium, Seoul, South Korea, on 2 May, a concert in Hong Kong Convention and Exhibition Centre, in Hong Kong, on 4 May, a concert in Taipei Arena, Taipei, Taiwan, on 6 May, and finally a free concert, organized by the YTL Corporation, at the Singapore Botanic Gardens, in Singapore, on 8 May, attended by over 12,000 people, picked via public ballot. The concert was later broadcast, in its entirety, by Channel NewsAsia, on 28 and 29 May, and by Okto, on 30 May, in Singapore. An orchid in the Botanic Gardens' National Orchid Garden was also named after Bocelli in response to the concert. Australian pop singer Delta Goodrem performed again with Bocelli in all five concerts, after supporting him in his United States My Christmas 2009 winter tour.

On 18 May, during the 2010 World Music Awards, Bocelli performed "Un Amore Cosi Grande" from his 2008 album, Incanto, and received his seventh World Music Award, for "Best Classical Artist". On 5 July, Bocelli gave a concert at the opening of the Khan Shatyr Entertainment Center, in Astana, on the occasion of Kazakhstan's president Nursultan Nazarbayev's 70th birthday. Four days later, Bocelli headlined the "Celebrate Africa: The Grand Finale" Concert at the Coca-Cola Dome, in Johannesburg, South Africa, to mark the end of the World Cup, two days before the final.

On 13 July, Montenegrin Statehood Day, Bocelli gave a concert at the seaside resort of Sveti Stefan, in western Montenegro, to mark the Golden Jubilee of the Sveti Stefan Hotel. The next day, Bocelli gave a concert at the European Parliament's Espace Léopold, in Brussels, Belgium, during "Rome in the heart of the future", an event hosted by the Vice President of the European Parliament for the seventh parliament, MEP, Roberta Angelilli. A screening of the film Homage to Rome, directed by Franco Zeffirelli, who was present during the event, and starring Bocelli, in his cinematographic debut, was shown prior to the special concert.

On 25 July, Bocelli held the fifth and final edition of the Teatro del Silenzio. Bocelli's guests included Spanish Catalan tenor José Carreras, and Italian rock singer Zucchero. Sculptures by Swiss artist Kurt Laurenz Metzler, who attended the concert, were exhibited during this year's edition. Bocelli was also awarded the Pisano Doc, during the dress rehearsal for the concert, on 24 July, and received the 2010 Premio Lunezia nel mondo, during a private ceremony held on 21 July, for "the musical-literary quality of his songs." In September 2010, Bocelli held a concert at the Odeon of Herodes Atticus, in Athens, Greece. All proceeds were donated to help cure cancer. Bocelli also gave concerts in Cairo, Egypt, in front of the pyramids and the Great Sphinx of Giza, as well as a fundraising concert inside the Duomo di Milano to benefit victims of the 2010 Haiti earthquake.

As part of the 2010 leg of the My Christmas Tour, Bocelli gave two concerts in The O2 Arena, in London, and the Manchester Arena, in Manchester, and a concert at The O2, in Dublin, in late November 2010. His sold-out concert at the O2 in London, was the most attended show in the venue's history, with 16,500 people attending the event. In early December, Bocelli gave six concerts in the United States. He performed in Madison Square Garden, in New York City, Prudential Center, in Newark, New Jersey, TD Garden, in Boston, Toyota Center, in Houston, Staples Center, in Los Angeles, and the MGM Grand's Garden Arena, in the Las Vegas Strip.

Bocelli also took part in the Christmas in Washington special on 12 December. Exactly a week later, he gave a concert conducted by Claudio Scimone, in the Italian Senate.

=== 2011–2014: Roméo et Juliette and Passione ===
In January, Bocelli gave three concerts in Germany. The concerts in Munich, Berlin, and Hamburg were all part of the Notte Illuminata Tour, launched in Pisa, at the Teatro Verdi, December 2010. In February, Bocelli performed a recital on the stage of the Metropolitan Opera house as part of the tour. In late March and early April, as part of the 2011 Latin leg of his Incanto tour, Bocelli gave concerts in Bogotá, and Panama City.

In May 2011, Bocelli held five concerts in East and Southeast Asia and was joined by New Zealand soprano Hayley Westenra during the tour. He first gave a concert in Jakarta, Indonesia. Bocelli held two other concerts in Taipei, and two concerts in Beijing. In June and July, he gave two open-air concerts at historic sites, the first at Masada, in Israel, with all proceeds dedicated to support the residents of the Israeli regions of Galilee and Negev, and the second at Syracuse's ancient Greek theatre, in Sicily, with all proceeds donated to the Fiamme di Solidarietà (Flames of Solidarity) organization, to raise awareness of issues concerning the poorest and most marginalized in Italy.

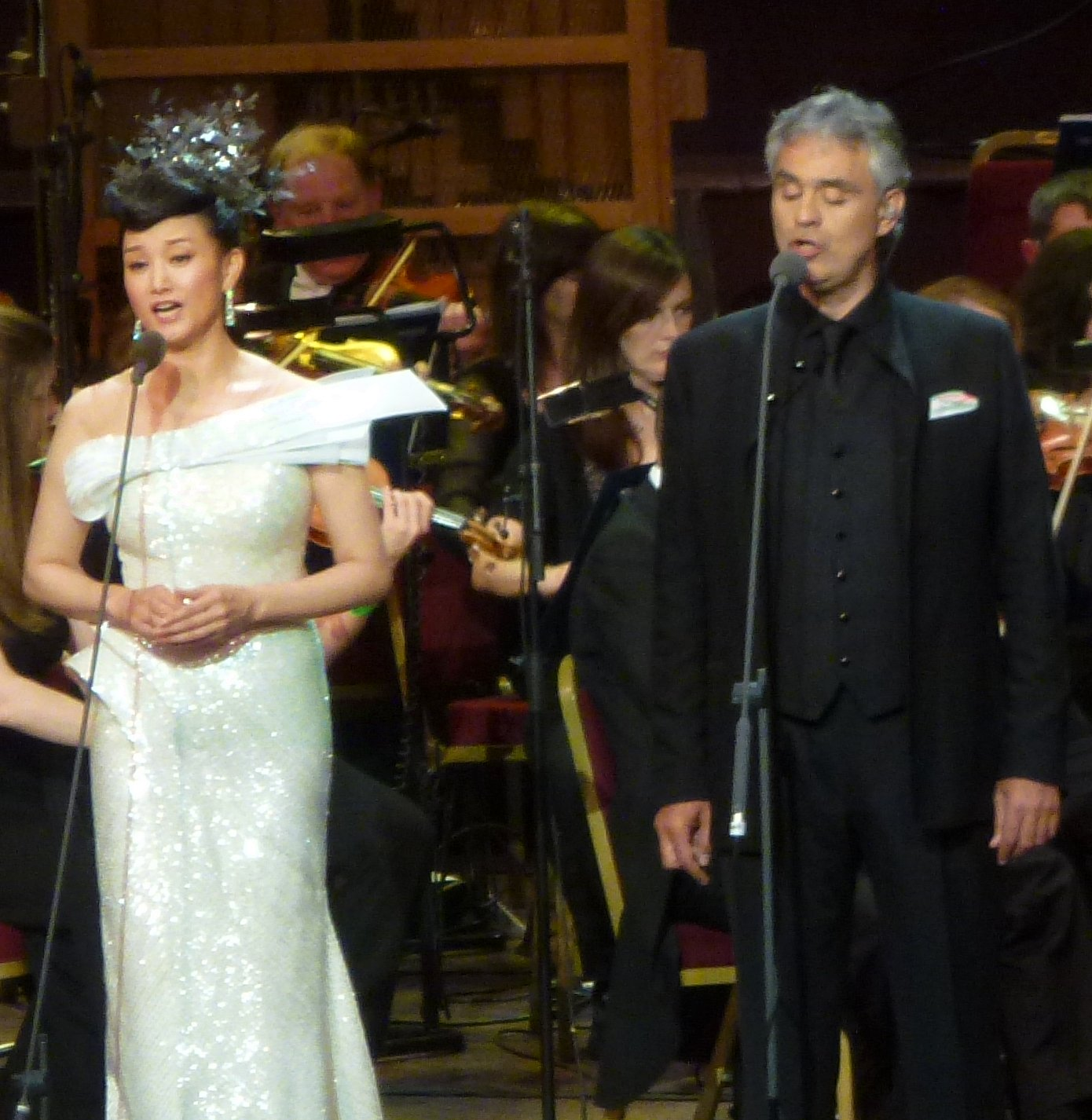
Andrea Bocelli and Song Zuying performing Time to Say Goodbye at the East Meets West concert at London's Royal Albert Hall, June 2012

Bocelli gave a free concert on 15 September, on the Great Lawn of Central Park in New York City. He was accompanied by the New York Philharmonic, conducted by its music director Alan Gilbert, and the Westminster Symphonic Choir. The concert was broadcast throughout the United States and Canada, by PBS, and in Italy, by Rai 1. Concerto: One Night in Central Park, the live album and the DVD were released 15 November. On 25 September, Bocelli led Songs of Praise's 50th anniversary celebration, alongside LeAnn Rimes and Katherine Jenkins.

On 15 October, Bocelli performed again for Pope Benedict XVI and a crowd of 8,000 people in Vatican's Audience Hall. On 7 November, he gave an open-air free concert at Praça Rui Barbosa in Belo Horizonte, Brazil, to an audience of between 80,000 and 150,000 people. Ten days later, Bocelli performed at the Children in Need Rocks Manchester concert, gaining critical acclaim for receiving a standing ovation from a crowd of pop and indie music fans. He played the role of Romeo in Charles Gounod's opera Roméo et Juliette, at the Teatro Carlo Felice, for two performances in February 2012. Bocelli cancelled a third performance because of pharyngitis after having vocal strain throughout.

On 22 April, Bocelli gave an open-air concert at Yerevan's Liberty Square, in Armenia, dedicated to the proclamation of Yerevan as the 2012 World Book Capital; he was accompanied by the Armenian Philharmonic Orchestra conducted by Marcello Rota. On 19 November, Bocelli performed for Queen Elizabeth II and Prince Philip, Duke of Edinburgh, at the Royal Albert Hall, during the 100th anniversary of the Royal Variety Performance.

A new studio album titled Passione, featuring duets with Jennifer Lopez and Nelly Furtado, was released on 29 January 2013. Nine days later, Bocelli was an honorary guest at the 61st Annual National Prayer Breakfast, held at the Washington Hilton, where he performed "Ombra mai fu" and Franz Schubert's "Ave Maria" in the presence of President Barack Obama, First Lady Michelle Obama, Vice President Joe Biden, as well as other political leaders. On 20 February, Bocelli performed at the concert in Moscow Kremlin dedicated to 20th anniversary of Gazprom. On 1 June, he performed with Plácido Domingo at the Arena di Verona, celebrating the 100th anniversary of the opera festival.

=== 2015–2019: Cinema, collaborations and Sì ===
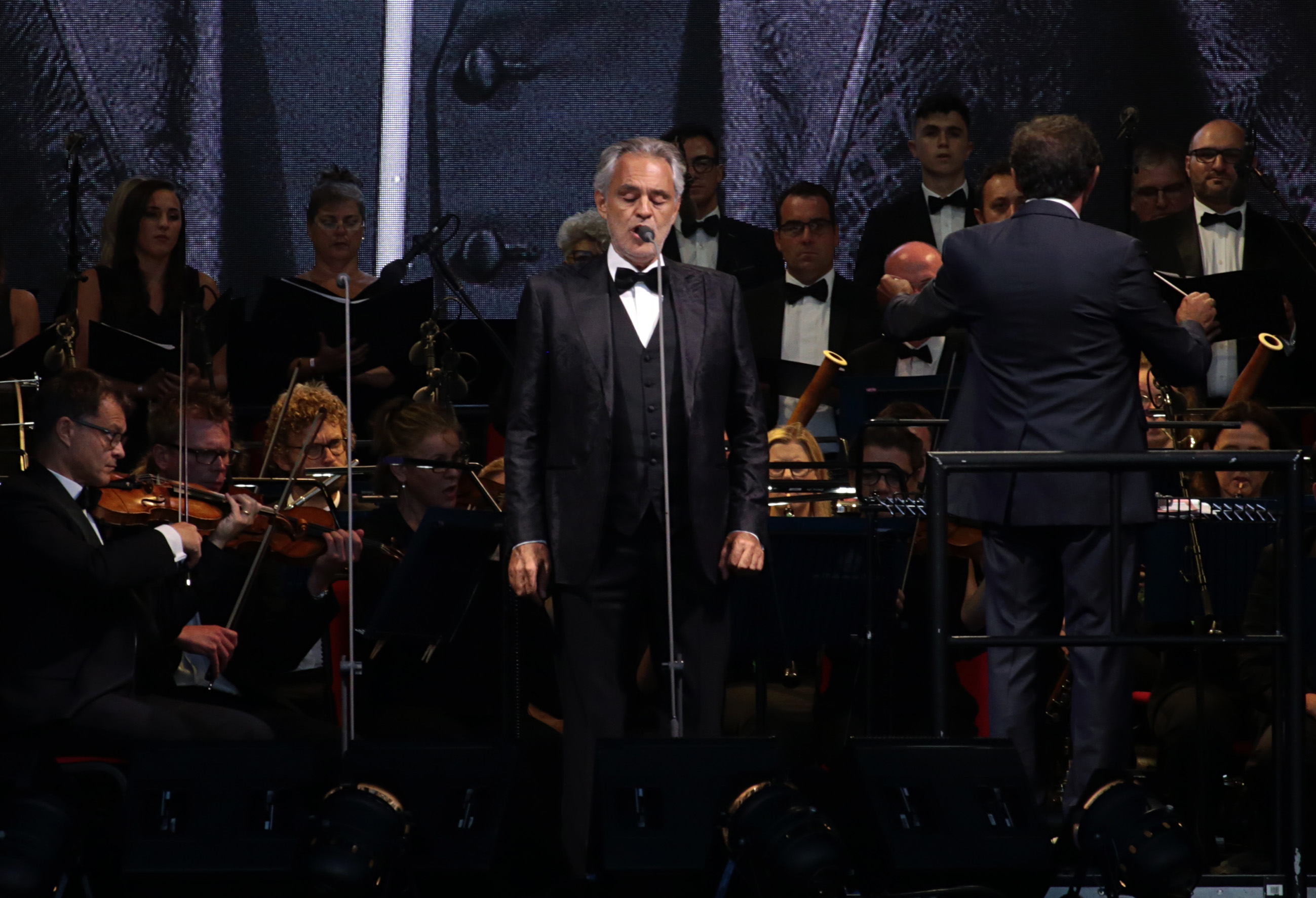
Andrea Bocelli concert in Gibraltar, September 2019

Bocelli released his fifteenth studio album Cinema on 23 October 2015. It contains renditions of classic film soundtracks and scores, featuring duets with Ariana Grande, Nicole Scherzinger and his wife Veronica Berti. The album received a nomination for Best Traditional Pop Vocal Album at the 59th Annual Grammy Awards; the Spanish-language version was nominated for Album of the Year at the 17th Annual Latin Grammy Awards.

On 7 May 2016, Bocelli performed at the King Power Stadium before Leicester City's final match of the 2015–16 Premier League against Everton, as part of the club's title celebrations. On 15 December 2017, Ed Sheeran released a collaboration with Bocelli titled "Perfect Symphony". The song is a duet version of Sheeran's song "Perfect", with many of the original English lyrics sung in Italian.

In June 2018, Bocelli released the single "If Only", his first after fourteen years. On 20 September, Bocelli released the single "Fall On Me" which features vocals from his son Matteo. The two performed the song on 22 October episode of Dancing With the Stars. An English version of the song was released in October and was featured in the Walt Disney Pictures film The Nutcracker and the Four Realms as the end credit song. Both songs appear on Bocelli's album Sì, released on 26 October. On 12 October, at the request of his close friend Sarah, Duchess of York, Bocelli performed two songs at the royal wedding of her daughter Princess Eugenie, the Bach/Gounod Ave Maria, and Panis angelicus by César Franck.

On 1 February 2019, Bocelli performed a sold-out concert in 'Winter at Tantora' festival running at Al-'Ula for the first time in Saudi Arabia. On 12 April 2020, during the national COVID-19 lockdowns in Italy, Bocelli performed an Easter Sunday concert from an empty Milan Cathedral, accompanied by cathedral organist Emanuele Vianelli. The performance, titled "Music For Hope - Live From Duomo di Milano", was streamed live over YouTube, where it continues to be available for replay. About 5 million people tuned in for the live stream performance and, by 13 April 2020, over 32 million views were logged on the archived video.

=== 2020–present: Believe and Duets (30th Anniversary) ===
In November 2020, Bocelli released an album, Believe. It was in response to the COVID-19 pandemic and featured recent pandemic related songs. He performed Puccini's "Nessun Dorma" during the Opening Ceremony of the 2020 UEFA European Football Championship held in Rome, Italy, on 11 June 2021. On 5 June 2022, Bocelli performed Puccini's "Nessun Dorma" during the BBC's Platinum Party at the Palace, one of the celebrations of the Platinum Jubilee of Elizabeth II.

On 21 October 2022, Bocelli released his first collaboration album with his son and daughter, Matteo and Virginia, titled A Family Christmas. On 7 May 2023, Bocelli performed "You'll Never Walk Alone" together with Bryn Terfel during the BBC's Coronation Concert to mark the coronation of Charles III. On 26 February 2024, Andrea Bocelli with his son Matteo performed at the Quinta Vergara Amphitheater Viña del Mar, Chile, at the LXIII Viña del Mar International Song Festival receiving the Gaviota Silver and Gold.

The Andrea Bocelli 30: The Celebration concerts were held on 15, 17 and 19 July 2024, at the Teatro del Silenzio in Lajatico, Italy. The events were later presented as a theatrical concert film in the United States and as a two-part television special on Canale 5 in Italy. Bocelli performed songs from his 30-year career, and was joined by several other musical guests for duets and solo performances. Guest performers included Jon Batiste, José Carreras, Sofia Carson, Plácido Domingo, Elisa, Tiziano Ferro, Aida Garifullina, Giorgia, Lang Lang, Brian May, Christian Nodal, Laura Pausini, Eros Ramazzotti, Ed Sheeran, Nadine Sierra, Shania Twain, Bryn Terfel, Franco Vassallo and Zucchero, as well as Russell Crowe, Johnny Depp and Will Smith. The show promoted the compilation album Duets (30th Anniversary), which features previously released collaborations from Bocelli's back catalog alongside new collaborations. The album was promoted by three duets: "Da Stanotte in Poi (From This Moment On)" with Shania Twain, "Vivo por Ella" with Karol G and "Rimani Qui" with Italian singer Elisa.

In 2025, the documentary Andrea Bocelli: Because I Believe was released. Bocelli made his first appearance in a feature film in Solo Mio, released in 2026, playing a dramatized version of himself. The scenes involving Bocelli were filmed at his real life villa in Tuscany, and his wife and daughter appear in the film. Bocelli performed "Nessun Dorma" at the 2026 Winter Olympics opening ceremony, held in Milan's San Siro stadium. On 10 June 2026 he was featured on "DNA (More Than a Game)", the official anthem of the 2026 FIFA World Cup, with David Guetta, Ejae and Megan Thee Stallion.

== Voice ==
Bocelli is a widely popular singer with a substantial fan base worldwide. However, he is also a polarizing figure in classical music, whose voice and performances have routinely been the subject of negative reviews by critics. Italian spinto tenor Franco Corelli praised Bocelli's voice after hearing it for the first time during a master class in 1986, in Turin, and he later gave Bocelli private lessons.

Puerto Rican soprano Ana María Martínez, who regularly performs with Bocelli, said: "More than anything, Andrea has something that is unique in that he brings this light that is always around him. And this purity of heart and beauty of sound just touches the listener. It can't be described."

Celine Dion said while introducing him during her Christmas Special for These Are Special Times, in 1998, that "if God had a singing voice, he must sound a lot like Andrea Bocelli", and David Foster, a producer of the album, often describes Bocelli's voice as the most beautiful in the world. Similarly, jazz singer Al Jarreau, who performed with Bocelli on the "Night of the Proms" tour in Europe in 1995, described him as "the most beautiful voice in the world", and American talk show host Oprah Winfrey commented on her talk show: "[W]hen I hear Andrea sing, I burst into tears." After attending Bocelli's concert at the Hollywood Bowl in 2009, British-American actress Elizabeth Taylor said, "My mind, my soul were transported by his beauty, his voice, his inner being. God has kissed this man and I thank God for it." Taylor had been a passionate fan of Bocelli since the beginning of his music career in the mid-1990s. Other fans include Albert II, Prince of Monaco, who invited the tenor to sing at his wedding, as well as Sarah, Duchess of York, and actress Isabella Rossellini.

Bocelli's voice, more specifically his interpretation of opera, has been regularly criticized by classical music critics. These include Bernard Holland of The New York Times and Andrew Clements of The Guardian. In 1999, The New York Times chief music critic Anthony Tommasini in his review of Bocelli's North American opera debut at the Detroit Opera House in the title role of Massenet's Werther commented, "The basic colour of Mr. Bocelli's voice is warm and pleasant, but he lacks the technique to support and project his sound. His sustained notes wobble. His soft high notes are painfully weak. Inadequate breath control often forces him to clip off notes prematurely at the end of phrases." In December 2000, Tommasini again criticised Bocelli, this time for his La bohème album when he stated that Bocelli "still has trouble with basic things, like breath support" and his voice had been "carefully recorded ... to help it match the trained voices of the other cast members in fullness and presence."

In describing Bocelli's singing, The New York Times music critic Bernard Holland noted, "the tone is rasping, thin and, in general, poorly supported. Even the most modest upward movement thins it even more, signalling what appears to be the onset of strangulation. To his credit, Mr Bocelli sings mostly in tune. But his phrasing tends toward carelessness and rhythmic jumble... The diction is not clear." Furthermore, Holland observed that "The critic's duty is to report that Mr Bocelli is not a very good singer." The Associated Press reported "Passion? Yes. Power. No. Bocelli's voice – though robust in spirit and precisely in tune, even in the upper register – had a thin quality that never opened up." Similarly, classical music critic Andrew Clements found Bocelli's studio opera recordings consistently disappointing in quality: "Bocelli's profoundly unmusical contribution, with its unvaryingly coarse tone, wayward intonation and never a phrase properly shaped, fatally undermines all their contributions." Anne Midgette of The New York Times agreed, noting "a thinness of voice, oddly anemic phrasing (including shortchanging upper notes of phrases in a most untenorial manner), a curious lack of expression."

During a 2009 performance in New York, the music critic Steve Smith wrote: "For cognoscenti of vocal artistry the risks involved in Mr. Bocelli's undertakings, both then and now, need no explanation. Substantial technical shortcomings masked by amplification are laid bare in a more conventional classical setting. Mr. Bocelli's tone can be pleasant, and his pitch is generally secure. But his voice is small and not well supported; his phrasing, wayward and oddly inexpressive."

In 2010, Joe Banno of The Washington Post gave an unfavourable review of Bocelli's Carmen recording, describing the oft-noted failings in Bocelli's vocal resources on full display in this performance: "Bocelli, to be fair, possesses an essentially lovely tenor and knows his stuff when it comes to selling a pop ballad. And Decca's close miking of his puny voice inflates his sound to near-Franco Corelli-like dimensions. But his short-breathed, clumsily phrased, interpretively blank and often pinched and strained singing makes his Don Jose a tough listen."

== Recognition ==
=== Honours ===
- Grand Officer of the Order of Merit of the Italian Republic (Grande Ufficiale Ordine al Merito della Repubblica Italiana) awarded in Rome, on 4 March 2006.
- Grand Officer of the Order of Merit of Duarte, Sánchez and Mella by the President of the Dominican Republic, Leonel Fernández in 2009, for his contributions to International art and culture.
- Star on the Hollywood Walk of Fame, for his contribution to live theater, at 7000 Hollywood Boulevard, in 2010.
- Gold medal for Merit by the president of Serbia Aleksandar Vučić in 2022.
- Knight of the Civil Order of Savoy by Emanuele Filiberto of Savoy in 2025.

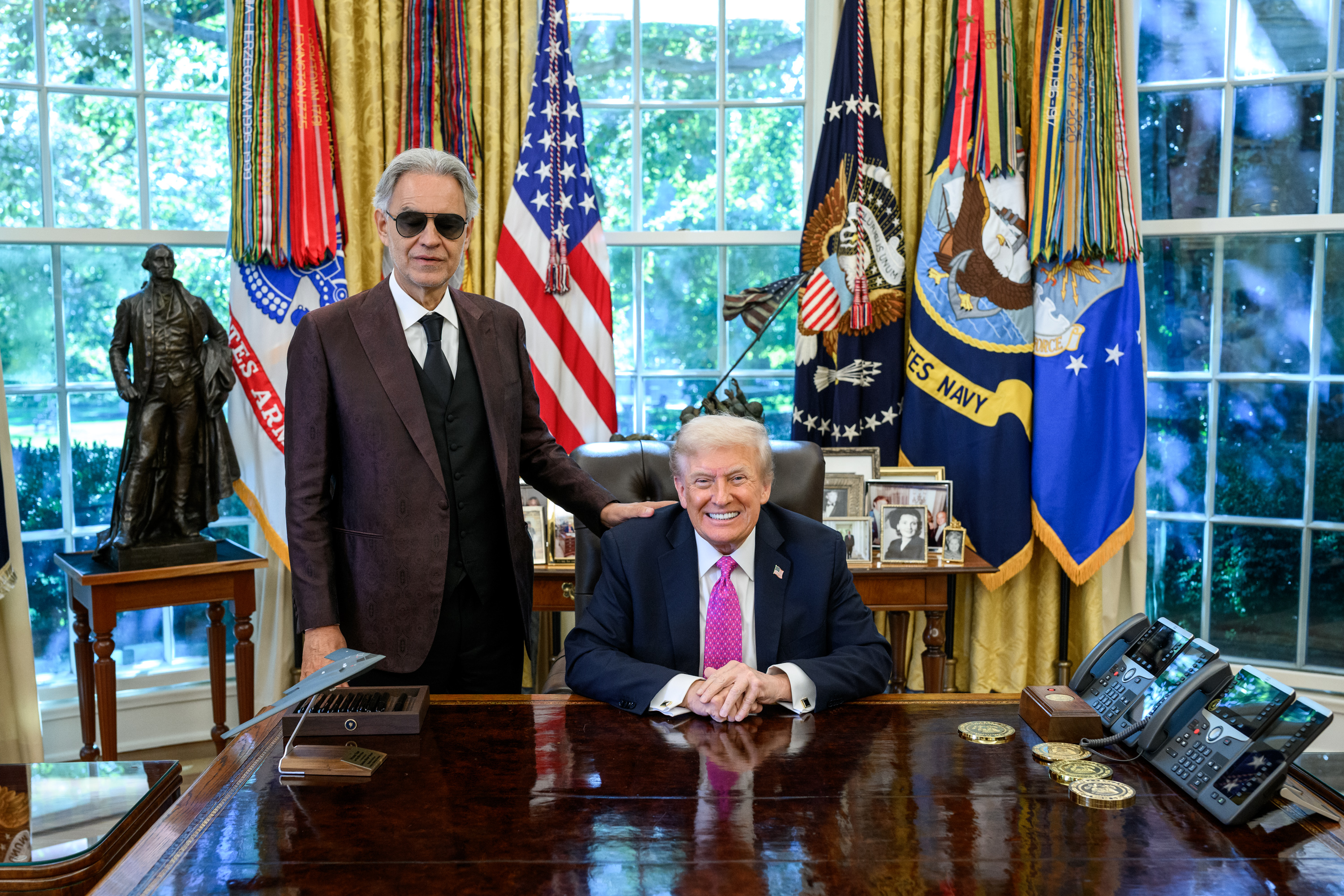
Bocelli with President Donald Trump in the Oval Office, October 2025

=== Selected awards ===
- Winner of the 1994 Newcomers section of the Sanremo Music Festival.
- ECHO music award for "Best Single of the Year" for "Time to Say Goodbye", in 1997.
- ECHO Klassik "Best seller of the year" award for his album, Viaggio Italiano in 1997.
- Bambi Award in 1997.
- Two World Music Awards, one in the category "Best Italian Singer", and one for "Best Classical Interpretation" in 1998.
- ECHO Klassik, for "Best selling classical album" with Aria: The Opera Album in 1998.
- ECHO Klassik for "Bestseller of the year" for Sacred Arias in 2000.
- Two 2000 Classical BRIT Awards for "Best selling classical album" and "Album of the year" for Sacred Arias in 2000.
- Goldene Europa for classical music in 2000.
- Goldene Kamera award in the "Music & Entertainment" category 2002.
- Two World Music Awards, for "World best selling classical artist" and for "Best selling Italian artist" in 2002.
- Telegatto award for the soundtrack of the series Cuore in 2002.
- 2002 Classical BRIT Award for "Outstanding Contribution to Music" in 2002.
- Two 2003 Classical BRIT Awards for "Best selling classical album" and "Album of the year" for Sentimento in 2003.
- Two World Music Awards for "Best Italian Artist" and "World's Best-selling Classical Artist" in 2006.
- Telegatto award in platinum for Italian music in the world in 2008.
- World Music Awards for "World's Best-selling Classical Artist" in 2010.
- "America Award" of the Italy–USA Foundation in 2012.
- "International Artist of the Year in association with Raymond Weil" of the Classic Brit Awards 2012.
- The Billboard Latin Music Lifetime Achievement Award in 2014.
- "Art, Science and Peace Prize" 2015 from PIER FRANCO MARCENARO founder of "Man Center" and "School of Spirituality" for Andrea Bocelli art which elevates the spirit.

== Personal life ==
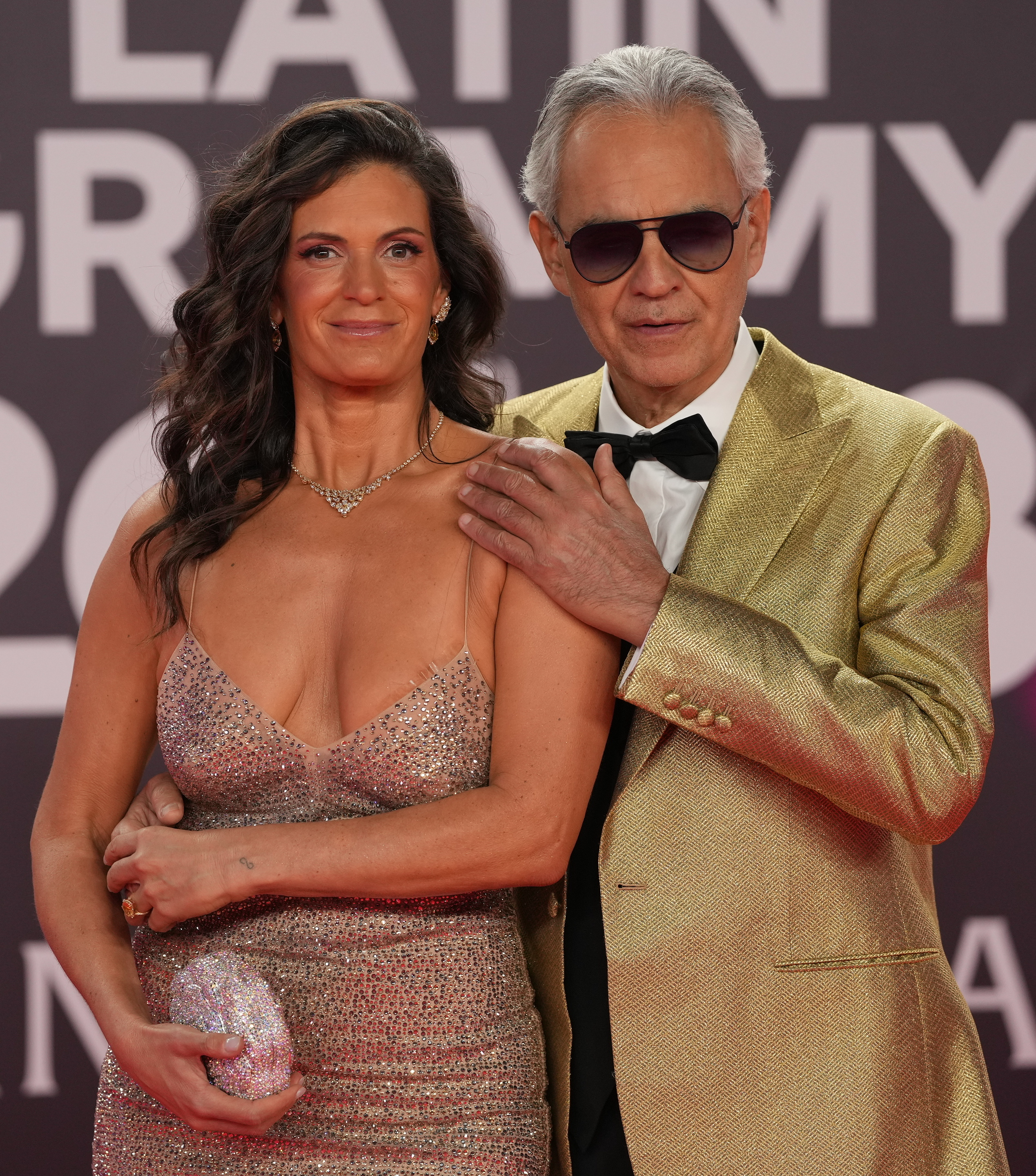
Bocelli with his wife Veronica Berti in 2023

Bocelli met his first wife, Enrica Cenzatti, while singing at piano bars early in his career. They were married on 27 June 1992. Their first child, son Amos, was born on 22 February 1995. Their second son, Matteo, was born on 8 October 1997. The couple separated in 2002.

On 30 April 2000, Bocelli's father, Alessandro Bocelli, died. His mother encouraged him to honor his commitments, and so he sang for Pope John Paul II, in Rome, on 1 May, and immediately returned home for the funeral. At his 5 July performance, filmed for PBS as American Dream—Andrea Bocelli's Statue of Liberty Concert, Bocelli dedicated the encore Sogno (Dream), from his 1999 album Sogno, to the memory of his father. His mother and brother continued to live in the family home after his father's death.

Bocelli lives with his second wife and manager, Veronica Berti. They met in 2002 and married on 21 March 2014, at the Sanctuary of Montenero in the coastal town of Livorno, Italy. In September 2011, the couple announced that Berti was expecting her first and Bocelli's third child. Their daughter Virginia Bocelli was born 21 March 2012. The couple live in the Tuscan town of Forte dei Marmi on the Mediterranean. Bocelli's first wife and two sons live in the couple's previous residence in the same comune, in Versilia.

On 12 November 2022, Andrea, Matteo and Virginia (aged 10) sang together at the Royal Albert Hall during the UK Festival of Remembrance.

A section of the beach in Jesolo, on the Italian Adriatic coast, was named after Bocelli on 11 August 2003.

In October 2013, Bocelli bought a second home in North Miami Beach.

Bocelli is a fan of the Italian football club Inter Milan. In an interview in Pisa, he told a group of Inter fans that "My passion for Inter started during my college years, when Inter was winning everything in Italy and the world. When Inter won the Champions League in 2010, I was with my friends and I was listening to the game on the radio, and everything was a little bit in advance so I was celebrating before them. That night I was also brought to tears of joy. The treble is a feeling no one in Italy will be able to equal".

On 12 November 2023, Bocelli performed 'Hallelujah' with his daughter Virginia on the BBC One programme Strictly Come Dancing. Bocelli performed 'Oh Holy Night' with his son Matteo on the December 2023 theatrical release of "Christmas with the Chosen: Holy Night".

=== Teatro del Silenzio ===
In 2006, Bocelli convinced the municipality of his hometown Lajatico to build an outdoor theatre, the "Teatro del Silenzio". He serves as its honorary president and performs usually for one night only, every July; the rest of the year, the theatre does not operate.

Since its opening in 2006, guest performers have included Plácido Domingo, José Carreras, Sarah Brightman, Katherine Jenkins, Zucchero, Laura Pausini, and Elisa. Bocelli's guests have also included instrumentalists Lang Lang, Chris Botti, and Kenny G. The 2007 concert was released on CD and DVD in 2008.

== Discography ==
=== Studio albums ===
- Il mare calmo della sera (1994)
- Bocelli (1995)
- Viaggio Italiano (1996/1997)
- Aria: The Opera Album (1998)
- Sogno (1999)
- Sacred Arias (1999)
- Verdi (2000)
- Cieli di Toscana (2001)
- Sentimento (2002)
- Andrea (2004)
- Amore (2006)
- Incanto (2008)
- My Christmas (2009)
- Passione (2013)
- Cinema (2015)
- Sì (2018)
- Believe (2020)
- Duets (2024)

=== Collaborative albums ===
- A Hymn for the World (1997)
- A Hymn for the World 2: Voices from Heaven (1998)
- Verdi's Requiem (2000)
- Carmen: Duets & Arias (2010)
- A Family Christmas (2022) with Matteo Bocelli and Virginia Bocelli

== Filmography ==
=== Film ===
Year	Title	Actor	Adaptation	Role	Type	Ref.
2009	Omaggio a Roma	Yes		Mario Cavaradossi	Short	
2017	The Music of Silence		Yes		Feature film	
2022	A Bocelli Family Christmas	Yes		Himself	Television film	
2024	Andrea Bocelli 30: The Celebration	Yes		Himself	Feature film	
2025	Andrea Bocelli: Because I Believe	Yes		Himself	Feature film	
2026	Solo Mio	Yes		Himself	Feature film	

=== Television ===
Year	Title	Network	Ref.
2009	L'alba separa dalla luce l'ombra - Concerto per l'Abruzzo	Rai 1	
2011	Concerto: One Night in Central Park	WNET	
2016	Bocelli & Zanetti Night	Canale 5	
2017	Andrea Bocelli Show	Rai 1	
2018	La notte di Andrea Bocelli	Rai 1	
2019	Ali di libertà	Rai 1	
2020	Music for Hope	Rai 1	
2020	Silent Night: A Christmas Prayer	Canale 5	
2021	Dal Circo Massimo, Andrea Bocelli!	Rai 3	
2022	The Simpsons Meet The Bocellis in Feliz Navidad	Disney+	
2022	Andrea Bocelli: Natale in famiglia	Sky Uno	
2023	The Journey: A Music Special from Andrea Bocelli	Paramount+	
2024	Andrea Bocelli 30: The Celebration	Canale 5	

== Bibliography ==
Bocelli is the author, and co-author, of numerous works available in Italian, English, and other languages. Some books are available in Braille and others in large print. The list below is limited to his English language books which are widely available.

- Bocelli, A. (2002) [1999]. The music of silence: a memoir by Andrea Bocelli. New York: HarperCollins. OCLC 54699002. Braille edition, ISBN not available.
- Bocelli, A. (2002). The music of silence: a memoir. Waterville, ME: Thorndike Press. ISBN 978-0-7862-3900-9. Large print edition.
- Bocelli, A. (2007). Andrea Bocelli – Amore. Milwaukee, WI: Hal Leonard Corp. ISBN 978-88-507-0992-2.
- Bocelli, A. (2001). The music of silence: a memoir. New York: HarperEntertainment. ISBN 978-0-06-621286-9.
- Bocelli, A. (2011). The Music of Silence; New Edition. Milwaukee, WI: Hal Leonard Corp. ISBN 978-1-57467-197-1.

== See also ==
- List of best-selling music artists
- Italian estimated best-selling music artists
