= Bocelli (album) =

Studio album by Andrea Bocelli
- Released: 13 November 1995
- Genre: Classical crossover
- Length: 43:00
- Label: Polygram International
- Producer: Mauro Malavasi

Andrea Bocelli chronology
Il mare calmo della sera (1994)	Bocelli (1995)	Viaggio Italiano (1996)

Bocelli is the second studio album by Italian tenor Andrea Bocelli, released in 1995 on the Polydor GmbH label.

This album is the follow-up to his debut album, Il mare calmo della sera. In Germany, the album was certified 4× Platinum for shipping two million units, making it one of the best-selling albums ever in the country. It was also certified 4× Platinum in Switzerland, 2× Platinum in the Netherlands, and Platinum in Austria.

The album is thought to have brought attention of Bocelli's existence to the masses outside of classical music circles, not just for the immense success of hit song "Con te partirò" but also because he covered the popular 1980s pop hit "The Power of Love" by Jennifer Rush.

== Track listing ==
1. "Con te partirò" (Lucio Quarantotto, Francesco Sartori)
2. "Per amore" (Mariella Nava) (Cover: Flavia Astolfi - Per amore 1995)
3. "Macchine da guerra" (Angus Smith)
4. "E chiove" (Joe Amoruso, Sergio Cirillo)
5. "Romanza" (Mauro Malavasi)
6. "The Power of Love" (Candy de Rouge, Gunther Mende, Mary S. Applegate, Jennifer Rush) (Cover: Jennifer Rush - The Power Of Love 1984)
7. "Vivo per lei" (with Giorgia)
8. "Le tue parole" (Joe Amoruso, Sergio Cirillo)
9. "Sempre sempre" (Gatto Panceri, Gianpietro Felisatti)
10. "Voglio restare così" (Andrea Bocelli)
11. "Vivo per lei" (Bonus track, with Judy Weiss) (Michael Kunze, Art Mengo, Gatto Panceri, Mauro Mengali, Valerio Zelli) (Cover: O.R.O. - Vivo per lei 1995) German Edition
12. "Time To Say Goodbye (Con te partirò)" (Bonus track, with Andrea Bocelli) (Frank Peterson, Lucio Quarantotto, Francesco Sartori) (Cover: Andrea Bocelli - Con te partirò 1995) German Edition hitparade.ch

See

== Chart performance ==
=== Weekly charts ===
Weekly chart performance for Bocelli
Chart (1995–1997)	Peak position
Austrian Albums (Ö3 Austria)	3
Belgian Albums (Ultratop Flanders)	1
Belgian Albums (Ultratop Wallonia)	1
Dutch Albums (Album Top 100)	1
German Albums (Offizielle Top 100)	1
Swiss Albums (Schweizer Hitparade)	1

=== Year-end charts ===
1995 year-end chart performance for Bocelli
Chart (1995)	Position
Belgian Albums (Ultratop Flanders)	45

1996 year-end chart performance for Bocelli
Chart (1996)	Position
Dutch Albums (Album Top 100)	3
German Albums (Offizielle Top 100)	82

1997 year-end chart performance for Bocelli
Chart (1997)	Position
Austrian Albums (Ö3 Austria)	10
Belgian Albums (Ultratop Wallonia)	72
Dutch Albums (Album Top 100)	35
European Albums (European Top 100 Albums)	7
German Albums (Offizielle Top 100)	1
Swiss Albums (Schweizer Hitparade)	2

1998 year-end chart performance for Bocelli
Chart (1998)	Position
German Albums (Offizielle Top 100)	97

== Certifications and sales ==
Sales and certifications for Bocelli
Region	Certification	Certified units/sales
Austria (IFPI Austria)	Platinum	50,000^{*}
Belgium (BRMA)	6× Platinum	350,000
France	—	350,000
Germany (BVMI)	4× Platinum	2,000,000^{^}
Netherlands (NVPI)	2× Platinum	400,000
Norway (IFPI Norway)	Gold	25,000^{*}
Switzerland (IFPI Switzerland)	4× Platinum	200,000^{^}
^{*} Sales figures based on certification alone.^{^} Shipments figures based on certification alone.

== See also ==
- List of best-selling albums in Germany
