= Viaggio italiano =

Studio album by Andrea Bocelli
- Released: 1996
- Recorded: 1995
- Genre: Classical
- Length: 68min
- Label: Polygram International

Andrea Bocelli chronology
Bocelli (1995)	Viaggio italiano (1996)	Romanza (1997)

Professional ratings
Review scores
Source	Rating
AllMusic	3/5 stars

Viaggio italiano ("Italian Trip") is Italian tenor Andrea Bocelli's third studio album and first classical album.

The album features some of the most popular opera arias and Neapolitan songs of all time, such as "Nessun dorma", "'O sole mio" and "La donna è mobile". Although released only in Italy in 1996, it sold close to 300,000 copies. Bocelli later received the ECHO Klassik "Best seller of the year" award for the album, after its international release, in 1997.

== Track listing ==
1. "Nessun dorma" (Giacomo Puccini)
2. "Il Lamento di Federico" (Francesco Cilèa)
3. "Ah, la paterna mano" (Giuseppe Verdi)
4. "La donna è mobile" (Giuseppe Verdi, Francesco Maria Piave)
5. "Una furtiva lagrima" (Gaetano Donizetti)
6. "Panis angelicus" (César Franck)
7. "Ave Maria" (Franz Schubert)
8. "'O sole mio" (Giovanni Capurro, Eduardo di Capua) (Cover: Giuseppe Anselmi - O sole mio...! 1907)
9. "Core 'ngrato" (Salvatore Cardillo, Alessandro Sisca)
10. "Santa Lucia luntana" (Ermes Alessandro Mario)
11. "I' te vurria vasà" (Eduardo di Capua, Vincenzino Russo)
12. "Tu, ca nun chiagne" (Ernesto De Curtis, Libero Bovio)
13. "O Marenariello" (Salvatore Gambardella, Gennaro Ottaviano)
14. "Piscatore 'e pusilleco" (Ernesto Tagliaferri, Ernesto Murolo)
15. "Messaggio Bocelli"
16. "Adeste fideles" (John Francis Wade)

== Charts ==
=== Weekly charts ===
Chart (1996–1998)	Peak position
Australian Albums (ARIA)	15
Austrian Albums (Ö3 Austria)	19
Belgian Albums (Ultratop Flanders)	3
Belgian Albums (Ultratop Wallonia)	2
Dutch Albums (Album Top 100)	8
French Albums (SNEP)	4
German Albums (Offizielle Top 100)	15
New Zealand Albums (RMNZ)	14
Norwegian Albums (VG-lista)	23
Swiss Albums (Schweizer Hitparade)	17
US Billboard 200	153

Chart (2003)	Peak position
Irish Albums (IRMA)	49
Scottish Albums (Official Charts)	24
UK Albums (Official Charts)	24

=== Year-end charts ===
Chart (1997)	Position
Belgian Albums (Ultratop Wallonia)	86
Dutch Albums (Album Top 100)	60
French Albums (SNEP)	30
German Albums (Offizielle Top 100)	68

Chart (1998)	Position
Australian Albums (ARIA)	74

Chart (2003)	Position
UK Albums (OCC)	80

== Certifications ==
Region	Certification	Certified units/sales
Argentina (CAPIF)	Platinum	60,000^{^}
Belgium (BRMA)	Platinum	90,000
Canada (Music Canada)	Platinum	100,000^{^}
Germany (BVMI)	Gold	250,000^{^}
Netherlands (NVPI)	Platinum	100,000^{^}
Norway (IFPI Norway)	Gold	25,000^{*}
Switzerland (IFPI Switzerland)	Gold	25,000^{^}
United Kingdom (BPI)	Platinum	300,000^{^}
United States (RIAA)	Gold	500,000^{^}
Summaries
Europe (IFPI)	Platinum	1,000,000^{*}
^{*} Sales figures based on certification alone.^{^} Shipments figures based on certification alone.
