= Gerardina Trovato =

Italian singer-songwriter (born 1967)

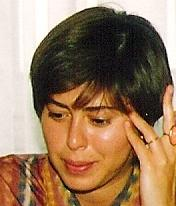

Background information
- Born: 27 May 1967 (age 59)
- Origin: Catania, Italy
- Genre: pop rock
- Occupation: Singer
- Years active: 1992–present

Gerardina Trovato (born 27 May 1967) is an Italian singer-songwriter. She rose to fame in 1993 with her performance of the song Non ho più la mia città at the Sanremo Music Festival, where she placed second with Ma non ho più la mia città in the newcomers' section with 7,209, slightly defeated with 7,464 votes by La Solitudine of Laura Pausini. The success of the song led to her debut album, Gerardina Trovato, achieving double platinum status. In 1994, she returned to Sanremo with the song Non è un film speaking of Bosnia war (and with video imagines of photographer Oliviero Toscani and later collaborated with renowned tenor Andrea Bocelli on the duet Vivere, having an international tour and featuring it in his debut album Il mare calmo della sera. She also opened for Zucchero Fornaciari’s tour in the summer of 1993.

Despite facing personal and professional challenges, including mental health issues and long absences from the public eye, Trovato remains an influential figure in Italian music, admired for her sincerity and artistic depth.

== Background ==
Born in Catania, Trovato started her career as backing vocalist, then, put under contract by singer-discographer Caterina Caselli, she took part at the Sanremo Music Festival 1993 with the song "Non ho più la mia città", ranking second behind La Solitudine of Laura Pausini in the newcomers section. The song achieved critical and commercial success and launched her career. In the Summer she was the opening act in Zucchero Fornaciari's concerts.

The following year Trovato come back to the Festival, this time in the Big Artists section, and ranked fourth with the song Non è un film. The song addresses the horrors of the Bosnian War, portraying vivid imagery of the conflict's atrocities. Lyrics describe scenes such as "blood on the arms" and "mud on the hands," emphasizing that "all of this isn't a film," highlighting the stark reality of war.

In May, she toured with the tenor-singer Andrea Bocelli; the couple also made a duet, "Vivere", written by the same Trovato and included in the Bocelli's album Romanza.

In 1996, Trovato published her third album, Ho trovato Gerardina, that led by the singles "Amori amori" and "Piccoli già grandi" obtained a good commercial success. In 2000, she made her third appearance at the Sanremo Festival with the autobiographical song "Gechi e vampiri". In 2005, Trovato took part at the musical reality show Music Farm from which she was eliminated in the second episode. In 2012, it was announced that the real life events of the singer would be the subject of a documentary film directed by Giacomo Franciosa.

In February 2016, she revealed in an interview that she had abandoned the scene due to a serious obsessive depressive neurosis and the difficulty of working in the music industry, and some liver problems. In May 27, 2017, with a message on her personal Facebook profile, the singer announced her retirement from the scene again, although she later performed in public in some concerts.

On January 5, 2020, she gave an interview to newspaper Il Messaggero in which she described the very difficult financial and personal situation she found herself in. On August 16, 2024, Corriere della Sera relaunched a touching video published on TikTok in which the singer made a heartfelt appeal: "I have always thought that what matters is the people and we would be nothing if it weren't for you. Don't abandon me, become more and more because you are my strength", words that come as a thanksgiving to a video published the day before, which immediately went viral, where it portrays the artist back to performing around the squares of Italy.

== Discography ==
=== Album ===
- 1993 – Gerardina Trovato
- 1994 – Non è un film
- 1996 – Ho Trovato Gerardina
- 1997 – Il sole dentro
- 2000 – Gechi, vampiri e altre storie
- 2005 – La collezione completa
- 2008 – I sogni (EP)

=== Singles ===
- 1993 – Lasciami libere le mani
- 1993 – Ma non-ho più la mia città
- 1993 – Sognare, sognare/ Just dreams
- 1994 – Angeli a metà
- 1994 – Non è un film
- 1994 – Vivere (with Andrea Bocelli)
- 1996 – Piccoli già grandi
- 1996 – Amori amori
- 1996 – Una storia già finita
- 1996 – E già (with Renato Zero)
- 1998 – Il sole dentro
- 2000 – Gechi e vampiri
- 2000 – Mammone
- 2003 – M'ama, non-m'ama (with VerbaVolant)
- 2006 – Un'altra estate
- 2008 – I sogni
- 2011 – I Nuovi Mille (with Lucariello)
- 2016 − Energia diretta
- 2025 – ‘’Credo nei miracoli’’
