= Nuccia Focile =

Italian operatic soprano

Nuccia Focile (born 25 November 1961) is an Italian operatic soprano.

Nuccia Focile was born in Militello in Val di Catania, Sicily, studied in Turin under Elio Battaglia, and made her opera debut in 1983 as Serpina in La Serva Padrona by Pergolesi in Spoleto. In 1984, she sang her first Mimi in La Boheme by Puccini at the Teatro Regio in Turin and made her debut as Oscar in Verdi's Un ballo in maschera at La Scala in 1986. Also in that year, she won the International Pavarotti Competition in Philadelphia, following which she made many concert appearances with the famous tenor. In 1995, she made her Metropolitan Opera debut as Mimì in Puccini's La bohème. She has performed many leading roles for Welsh National Opera. Focile has been described as bringing an "almost unbearable poignancy" to Mimì, her best-known role.

She has made several recordings for the Philips, Opera Rara and Telarc labels, including three Mozart operas (Le Nozze di Figaro, Così fan tutte, and Don Giovanni) conducted by Sir Charles Mackerras, Rossini's Petite messe solennelle conducted by Sir Neville Marriner, Ascanio in Pergolesi's Lo Frate'Nnamorato, Norina in Donizetti's Don Pasquale conducted by Riccardo Muti and Tatyana in Tchaikovsky's Eugene Onegin conducted by Semyon Bychkov.

Focile was awarded Artist of the Year 2013 for La Voix Humaine by Poulenc at Seattle Opera.

In 2017, Nuccia Focile was appointed Professor of Voice at the Royal Academy of Music in London.

== Sources ==
- Seattle Opera bio, archived from the original on 1 September 2014
