= Andrea Bocelli discography =

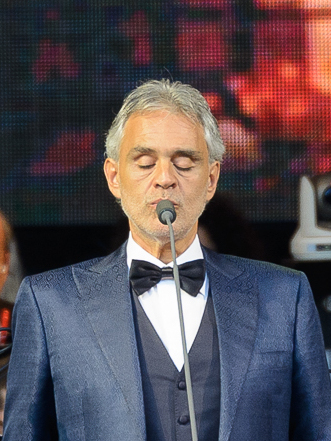
- Andrea Bocelli at the Cinema World Tour in 2017
- Studio albums: 17
- Extended plays: 1
- Compilation albums: 4
- Singles: 22
- Video albums: 9
- Music videos: 28
- Songs written for film soundtracks: 4
- Collaborative albums: 4
- Complete opera recordings: 11
- Bibliography: 1

Italian pop tenor and crossover artist Andrea Bocelli has released seventeen pop, classical, and Latin studio albums, including one holiday album; four compilation albums; twenty two singles; four collaborative albums; eleven complete opera recordings; three live albums, and nine live video releases.

From the release of his debut album, Il mare calmo della sera, after winning the Newcomers section of the 1994 Sanremo Music Festival with the song of the same name, to the release of his first holiday album, My Christmas, the best-selling holiday album and one of the best-selling albums of 2009, To date, Andrea Bocelli is one of the best-selling music artists of all time, with over 90 million records sold worldwide, with over 5 billion streams, of which 25.2 million albums in the United States. Thus, he is the biggest-selling singer in the history of classical music.

In 1999, his nomination for Best New Artist at the Grammy Awards marked the first time a classical artist had been nominated in the category, since Leontyne Price, in 1961. The Prayer, his duet with Celine Dion for the animated film, The Quest for Camelot, won the Golden Globe for Best Original Song and was nominated for an Academy Award in the same category. With the release of his classical album, Sacred Arias, Bocelli captured a listing in the Guinness Book of World Records, as he simultaneously held the No. 1, 2 and 3 positions on the US Classical albums chart. The next three-and-a-half years followed with Bocelli holding permanent residency at the No. 1 spot. Six of his albums have since reached the Top 10 on the Billboard 200, and a record-setting 7, have topped the Classical albums charts, in the United States.

With 5 million units sold worldwide, Sacred Arias became the biggest-selling classical album by a solo artist of all time, and with just under 20 million units sold worldwide, his 1997 pop album, Romanza, became the best-selling album by an Italian artist ever, as well as the best-selling album by a foreign artist in Canada, and a number of other countries in Europe and Latin America. The album's first single, "Time to Say Goodbye", topped charts all across Europe, including Germany, where it stayed at the Top of the charts for fourteen consecutive weeks, breaking the all-time sales record, with over 3 million copies sold in the country. "Con te partirò", Bocelli's original solo version of the single, also became the best-selling single ever in Belgium, in 1996. He is widely regarded as the most popular Italian and classical singer in the world.

== Studio albums ==
=== Pop albums ===
List of pop albums, with selected details, chart positions, sales, and certifications
Title	Album details	Peak chart positions										Sales	Certifications
Title	Album details	ITA FIMI	ITA M&D	AUS	AUT	GER	NLD	SWE	SWI	UK	US	Sales	Certifications
Il mare calmo della sera	Released: 1994; Label: Polydor (Polygram); Formats: CD, cassette	—	8	—	33	16	40	11	—	—	—	FRA: 100,000; GER: 75,000; NLD: 90,000	NLD: Gold
Bocelli	Released: 13 November 1995; Label: Polydor (Polygram); Formats: CD, cassette	8	10	—	3	1	1	—	1	—	—	FRA: 350,000; NLD: 400,000; Europe: 3,000,000	AUT: Platinum; GER: 4× Platinum; NLD: 2× Platinum; SWI: 4× Platinum
Sogno	Released: 22 March 1999; Label: Polydor (Polygram); Formats: CD, cassette	1	1	3	3	6	1	1	1	4	4	US: 2,500,000; Europe: 2,000,000	AUS: 2× Platinum; AUT: Gold; CAN: 5× Platinum; FRA: 2× Gold; GER: Gold; NDL: 2× Platinum; SWE: Gold; SWI: 2× Platinum; UK: Platinum; US: 2× Platinum
Cieli di Toscana	Released: 15 October 2001; Label: Polydor (Universal); Formats: CD, cassette	4	6	6	4	3	1	1	8	3	11	WW: 4,000,000	AUS: Platinum; AUT: Gold; CAN: 2× Platinum; FRA: Gold; GER: Gold; NLD: 2× Platinum; SWE: Platinum; SWI: Platinum; UK: Platinum; US: Platinum
Andrea	Released: 1 November 2004; Label: Polydor (Universal); Formats: CD, cassette	19	20	12	19	41	1	8	12	19	16	US: 787,000	AUS: Platinum; CAN: Platinum; NLD: Gold; UK: Gold; US: Platinum
Amore	Released: 8 February 2006; Label: Polydor (Universal); Formats: CD	2	1	5	4	23	1	2	8	4	3	ITA: 105,000; US: 1,700,000	AUS: Gold; AUT: Gold; CAN: Platinum; NLD: Platinum; SWI: Gold; UK: Platinum; US: Platinum
My Christmas	Released: 20 November 2009; Label: Decca (Universal); Formats: CD, Digital download	1	1	27	11	42	6	9	6	18	2	US: 3,000,000; WW: 5,000,000	CAN: 5× Platinum; ITA: 3× Platinum; NLD: Gold; SWI: Gold; UK: Gold; US: 2× Platinum
Passione	Released: 25 January 2013; Label: Decca (Universal); Formats: CD, Digital download	3	3	33	11	40	5	3	34	7	2	US: 370,000	CAN: Gold; ITA: Gold; US: Gold
Cinema	Released: 23 October 2015; Label: Decca (Universal); Formats: CD, Digital download	4	2	7	45	60	17		33	3	10	US: 29,000; UK: 177,609; WW: 700,000	CAN: Gold; ITA: Platinum; UK: Gold
Sì	Released: 26 October 2018; Label: Decca (Universal); Formats: LP, CD, digital download	6	—	7	10	10	7	—	10	1	1	US: 123,000; UK: 200,000	ITA: Gold; UK: Gold
Believe	Released: 13 November 2020; Label: Decca (Universal); Formats: LP, CD, digital download	27	—	5	—	45	22	—	—	3	26		
"—" denotes items which were not released in that country or failed to chart or the peak is unavailable.

=== Classical albums ===
List of classical albums, with selected details, chart positions, sales, and certifications
Title	Album details	Peak chart positions										Sales	Certifications
Title	Album details	ITA FIMI	ITA M&D	AUS	AUT	FRA	GER	NLD	SWI	UK	US	Sales	Certifications
Viaggio Italiano	Released: 1995; Label: Polydor (Polygram); Formats: CD, cassette	6	9	15	19	4	15	8	17	24	153	GER: 150,000	AUS: Platinum; CAN: Platinum; GER: Gold; NLD: Platinum; SWI: Gold; UK: Platinum; US: Gold
Aria: The Opera Album	Released: 23 March 1998; Label: Philips (Polygram); Formats: CD, cassette	20	18	70	5	5	6	9	5	33	59		AUS: Gold; AUT: Gold; CAN: Platinum; FRA: Gold; GER: Gold; SWI: Gold; UK: Gold; US: Platinum
Sacred Arias	Released: 9 November 1999; Label: Philips (Polygram); Formats: CD, cassette	6	7	7	2	5	3	1	2	20	22	WW: 5,000,000	AUS: Platinum; AUT: Gold; CAN: 2× Platinum; FRA: 2× Gold; NLD 4× Platinum; SWE: Gold; SWI: Platinum; UK: Platinum; US: Platinum
Verdi	Released: 11 September 2000; Label: Philips (Universal); Formats: CD, cassette	31	21	20	8	33	22	8	18	17	23		AUS: Gold; CAN: Platinum; NLD: 2× Platinum; SWI: Gold; UK: Gold; US: Gold
Sentimento	Released: 4 November 2002; Label: Philips (Universal); Formats: CD, cassette	11	16	17	14	33	30	4	22	7	12	US: 920,000; WW: 2,500,000	AUS: Platinum; CAN: Platinum; NLD: Gold; SWE: Gold; SWI: Gold; UK: Platinum; US: Platinum
Incanto	Released: 24 October 2008; Label: Decca (Universal); Formats: CD, digital download	5	6	33	40	28	56	15	40	12	8	ITA: 100,000; US: 500,000	AUS: Gold; UK: Gold
"—" denotes items which were not released in that country or failed to chart or the peak is unavailable.

=== Latin albums ===
List of Latin albums, with selected details, chart positions, and certifications
Title	Album details	Peak chart positions		Certifications
Title	Album details	US Latin	US Latin Pop	Certifications
Amor	Released: 28 February 2006; Label: Universal Music Latino; Formats: CD	2	1	US: 2× Platinum (Latin)
Lo Mejor de Andrea Bocelli: Vivere	Released: 6 November 2007; Label: Universal Music Latino; Formats: CD, digital download	5	3	GER: Gold; US: Platinum (Latin)
Mi Navidad	Released: 21 November 2009; Label: Universal Music Latino; Formats: CD, digital download	1	1	US: Gold (Latin)
Pasión	Released: 25 January 2013; Label: Universal Music Latino; Formats: CD, digital download	1	1	
Amor En Portofino	Released: 21 October 2013; Label: Universal Music Latino; Formats: CD, digital download	7	3	
Cinema (Edición en Español)	Released: 23 October 2015; Label: Universal Music Latino; Formats: CD, digital download	2	1	
"—" denotes items which were not released in that country or failed to chart or the peak is unavailable.

=== Compilation albums ===
List of compilations, with selected details, chart positions, sales, and certifications
Title	Album details	Peak chart positions										Sales	Certifications
Title	Album details	ITA FIMI	ITA M&D	AUS	AUT	BEL (FL)	BEL (WA)	NLD	SWE	UK	US	Sales	Certifications
Romanza	Released: 23 September 1997; Label: Polydor (Universal); Formats: CD, cassette	1	1	2	1	2	1	1	5	6	35	CAN: 1,123,000; ITA: 800,000; US: 4,200,000; WW: 20,000,000	AUS: 7× Platinum; AUT: Platinum; CAN: Diamond; FRA: Diamond; GER: Platinum; ITA: Diamond; NLD: 2× Platinum; SWE: Platinum; SWI: 7× Platinum; UK: Platinum; US: 3× Platinum
The Best of Andrea Bocelli: Vivere	Released: 12 January 2007; Label: Polydor (Universal); Formats: CD, digital download	2	2	11	13	12	10	3	4	4	9	ITA: 200,000	ITA: Platinum; AUS: Platinum; AUT: Gold; CAN: Platinum; NLD: Platinum; SWE: Gold; SWI: Gold; UK: 3× Platinum; US: Platinum
Opera – The Ultimate Collection	Released: 5 November 2012 (UK), 2014 (WW); Label: Decca (Universal); Formats: CD, Cassette	18	15	—	—	123	81	28	—	10	57		UK: Gold
Duets (30th Anniversary)	Released: 25 October 2024; Label: Decca	65	—	47	30	47	—	30	—	14	24		
"—" denotes items which were not released in that country or failed to chart or the peak is unavailable.

=== Live albums ===
List of live albums, with selected details, chart positions, sales, and certifications
Title	Album details	Peak chart positions										Certifications
Title	Album details	ITA FIMI	ITA M&D	AUT	BEL (FL)	BEL (WA)	NLD	SPA	SWE	UK	US	Certifications
Under the Desert Sky	Released: 7 November 2006; Label: Verve (Universal); Formats: CD, DVD	—	—	—	—	—	—	—	—	—	11	CAN: Gold
Vivere Live in Tuscany	Released: 29 January 2008; Label: Polydor (Universal); Formats: CD, Digital download, DVD	22	26	—	—	—	—	—	—	26	22	UK: Silver
Concerto: One Night in Central Park	Released: 11 November 2011; Label: Poldor (Universal); Formats: CD, Digital download, DVD	9	8	38	49	29	30	73	17	17	4	ITA: Platinum; UK: Gold; US: Platinum
Love in Portofino	Released: 23 August 2013; Label: Verve; Formats: CD, Digital download, DVD	11	11	—	104	111	36	97	—	5	40	
"—" denotes items which were not released in that country or failed to chart or the peak is unavailable.

=== Collaborative albums ===
List of collaborative albums, with selected details, chart positions, sales, and certifications
Title	Album details	Peak chart positions								Certifications
Title	Album details	ITA	AUS	BEL	FIN	FRA	IRE	UK Cl.	US	Certifications
A Hymn for the World (with Myung-whun Chung and Cecilia Bartoli)	Released: 7 August 1997; Label: Deutsche Grammophon; Formats: CD, Cassette	—	—	—	—	12	—	—	—	
A Hymn for the World 2 (Voices From Heaven) (with Myung-whun Chung, Cecilia Bartoli, Bryn Terfel)	Released: 3 November 1998; Label: Philips (Universal); Formats: CD, Cassette	—	—	—	—	—	—	—	—	
Requiem (with Renée Fleming, Olga Borodina, Ildebrando D'Arcangelo)	Released: 19 March 2001; Label: Polydor (Universal); Formats: CD, cassette	—	—	—	—	—	—	—	—	
Carmen: Duets & Arias (with Bryn Terfel, Marina Domashenko, Eva Mei)	Released: 6 October 2010; Label: Decca (Universal); Formats: CD, digital download	—	—	18	28	110	83	2	—	
A Family Christmas (with Matteo Bocelli and Virginia Bocelli)	Released: 21 October 2022; Label: Decca (Universal); Formats: CD, digital download	10	3	86	—	—	1	—	53	UK: Silver
"—" denotes items which were not released in that country or failed to chart or the peak is unavailable.

=== Extended plays ===
List of extended plays with selected details
Title	EP details
ITunes Festival: London 2012	Released: 4 October 2012; Label: Decca (Universal); Formats: Digital download

=== Digital albums ===
List of digital albums with selected details
Title	Album details
Notte Illuminata	Released: 28 March 2011; Label: (Universal); Formats: Digital download

== Opera recordings ==
List of opera recordings with selected details
Year	Title	Cast	Conductor and ensemble	Studio
2000	La Bohème	Andrea Bocelli, Barbara Frittoli, Paolo Gavanelli, Eva Mei, et al.	Zubin Mehta; Israel Philharmonic Orchestra; Coro del Maggio Musacale Fiorentino; Coro di Voci bianche della Scuola di Musica di Fiesole	Decca; Cat: 464 060-2 (2 CD)
2003	Tosca	Andrea Bocelli, Fiorenza Cedolins, Carlo Guelfi, Ildebrando D'Arcangelo, et al.	Zubin Mehta; Orchestra del Maggio Musicale Fiorentino; Coro del Maggio Musicale Fiorentino; Coro Polifonico della Scuola di Musica di Fiesole	Decca; Cat: 473 710-2 (2 CD)
2004	Il trovatore	Andrea Bocelli, Verónica Villarroel, Elena Zaremba, Carlo Guelfi, Carlo Colombara, et al.	Steven Mercurio; Orchestra del Teatro Massimo Bellini di Catania; Coro del Teatro Massimo Bellini di Catania	Decca; Cat: 475 366-2 (2 CD)
2005	Werther	Andrea Bocelli, Julia Gertseva, Natale de Carolis, Magali Léger, Giorgio Giuseppini, et al.	Yves Abel; Orchestra di Voci Bianche del Teatro Comunale di Bologna; Coro di Voci Bianche del Teatro Comunale di Bologna	Decca; Cat: 475 6557 (2 CD)
2006	Pagliacci	Andrea Bocelli, Ana María Martínez, Stefano Antonucci, Francesco Piccoli, Roberto Accurso, et al.	Steven Mercurio; Orchestra del Teatro Massimo Bellini di Catania; Coro del Teatro Massimo Bellini di Catania; Coro di voci Bianche "Gaudeamus igitur" Concentus	Decca; Cat: 475 7753 (CD)
2007	Cavalleria rusticana	Andrea Bocelli, Paoletta Marrocu, Stefano Antonucci, et al.	Steven Mercurio; Orchestra del Teatro Massimo Bellini di Catania; Coro del Teatro Massimo Bellini di Catania	Decca; Cat: B0007180-02 (CD)
2008	Carmen	Andrea Bocelli, Marina Domashenko, Eva Mei, Bryn Terfel, et al.	Myung-whun Chung; Orchestre Philharmonique de Radio France; Chœur de Radio France	Decca; Cat: B0014002-02 (2 CD)
2010	Andrea Chénier	Andrea Bocelli, Violeta Urmana, Lucio Gallo, Stella Grigorian, Cinzia De Mola, Elena Obraztsova, et al.	Marco Armiliato; Orchestra Sinfonica di Milano Giuseppe Verdi; Coro di Milano Giuseppe Verdi	Decca; Cat: 478 2382 (2 CD)
2012	Roméo et Juliette	Andrea Bocelli, Maite Alberola, et al.	Fabio Luisi; Orchestra del Teatro Carlo Felice; Coro del Teatro Carlo Felice	Decca; Cat: 478 4372 (2 CD)
2014	Manon Lescaut	Andrea Bocelli; Ana María Martínez, et al.	Plácido Domingo, Orquestra de la Comunitat Valenciana; Coro de la Generalitat Valenciana	Decca; Cat: 0289 478 7490 (2 CD)
2015	Turandot	Andrea Bocelli; Jennifer Wilson, et al.	Zubin Mehta, Orquestra de la Comunitat Valenciana; Coro de la Generalitat Valenciana	Decca; Cat: 0289 478 8293 0 (2 CD)
2016	Aida	Andrea Bocelli; Kristin Lewis, et al.	Zubin Mehta, Orchestra del Maggio Musicale Fiorentino; Coro del Maggio Musicale Fiorentino	Decca; Cat: 0289 47883 0075 4 (2 CD)

== Singles ==
List of singles as lead artist, showing year released, selected chart positions, certifications, and originating album
Title	Year	Peak chart positions										Certifications	Album
Title	Year	ITA FIMI	ITA M&D	AUT	BEL	CAN	FRA	GER	NLD	SWE	UK	Certifications	Album
"Il mare calmo della sera"	1994	—	—	—	—	—	24	—	31	—	—		Il mare calmo della sera
"Con te partirò"/"Vivere"	1995	—	—	1	1^{[A]}	—	1	—	18	—	69	ITA: Gold	Bocelli
"Macchine da Guerra"	1995	—	—	—	36^{[A]}	—	—	—	—	—	—		Bocelli
"Per amore"	1995	—	—	—	—	—	—	—	15	—	—		Bocelli
"Vivo per lei" (with Giorgia or Judy Weiss / Hélène Ségara / Marta Sánchez / Sandy / Bonnie Tyler / Heather Headley / Kendji Girac)	1996	43	24	22	1^{[B]}	—	1	45	39	—	—	ITA: Gold; BEL: Platinum; FRA: Platinum	Romanza
"Time to Say Goodbye" (with Sarah Brightman)	1996	—	—	1	—	—	25	1	5	1	2	AUT: Platinum; GER: 11× Gold; SWI: 2× Platinum; UK: Platinum	Romanza
"Ave Maria"	1999	—	—	—	—	—	—	—	—	—	65		Non-album single
"The Prayer" (with Celine Dion)	1999	—	—	—	—	—	—	—	—	—	—		Sogno
"Canto della Terra"	1999	—	—	—	—	—	42	—	78	—	24		Sogno
"Melodramma"	2001	—	—	—	—	—	—	95	52	77	—		Cieli di Toscana
"Mille Lune Mille Onde"	2001	—	—	—	—	—	—	—	—	—	—		Cieli di Toscana
"L'abitudine" (with Helena Hellwig)	2001	—	37	—	—	—	—	—	86	—	—		Cieli di Toscana
"Dell'amore non si sa"	2004	—	40	—	—	—	—	—	—	—	—		Andrea
"Un nuovo giorno"	2004	—	—	—	—	—	—	—	—	—	—		Andrea
"Somos Novios (It's Impossible)" (with Christina Aguilera)	2006	—	39	—	—	—	—	—	—	—	—		Amore
"Because We Believe" (with Marco Borsato)	2006	—	—	—	4^{[A]}	—	—	—	1	—	—		Amore
"Ama Credi E Vai" (with Gianna Nannini)	2006	35	9	—	—	—	—	—	—	—	—		Amore
"Dare to live (Vivere)" (with Laura Pausini)	2007	17	—	—	—	—	—	—	—	—	—		The Best of Andrea Bocelli: Vivere
"Vive Ya" (with Laura Pausini)	2008	—	—	—	—	—	—	—	—	—	—		The Best of Andrea Bocelli: Vivere
"White Christmas/Bianco Natale"	2009	—	—	—	—	—	—	—	1	—	—		My Christmas
"What Child Is This" (with Mary J. Blige)	2009	—	—	—	—	66	—	—	—	—	—		My Christmas
"Bridge over Troubled Water" (with Mary J. Blige)	2010	—	—	—	—	52	—	—	—	—	—		Charity single for the 2010 Haiti earthquake
"E Più Ti Penso"(featuring Ariana Grande)	2015	—	—	—	—	—	—	—	—	—	—		Cinema
"Perfect Symphony" (with Ed Sheeran)	2017	—	2	26	—	—	—	—	—	—	—		Non-album single
"Fall on Me" (with Matteo Bocelli)	2018	—	—	—	—	97	—	—	—	—	—		Sì
"If Only" (featuring Dua Lipa)	2018	—	—	—	—	—	—	—	—	—	—		Sì
"Amo Soltanto Te / This Is the Only Time" (Andrea Bocelli featuring Ed Sheeran)	2019	—	—	—	—	—	—	—	—	—	—		Sì
"Return to Love" (featuring Ellie Goulding)	2019	—	—	—	—	—	—	—	—	—	—		Sì Forever (The Diamond Edition)
"Da Stanotte in Poi (From This Moment On)" (featuring Shania Twain)	2024	—	—	—	—	—	—	—	—	—	—		Duets (30th Anniversary)
"Vivo Por Ella" (featuring Karol G)	2024	—	—	—	—	—	—	—	—	—	—		Duets (30th Anniversary)
"Rimani Qui" (featuring Elisa)	2024	—	—	—	—	—	—	—	—	—	—		Duets (30th Anniversary)
"Je Vis Pour Elle" (featuring Kendji Girac)	2025	—	—	—	—	—	—	—	—	—	—		
"Alé Pisa alé"	2025	—	—	—	—	—	—	—	—	—	—		
"Polvere e Gloria" (featuring Jannik Sinner)	2025	—	—	—	—	—	—	—	—	—	—		
"DNA (More Than a Game)" (with David Guetta, Ejae and Megan Thee Stallion)	2026	—	—	64	—	—	—	71	—	68	—		Official FIFA World Cup 2026 Album
"—" denotes a recording that did not chart or was not released in that territory.

- A Note that the peak positions of "Con te partirò", "Macchine da guerra" and "Because We Believe" are for the Dutch-speaking Flanders region.
- B Note that the peak position of "Vivo per lei" is for the French-speaking Wallonia region.

== Other charted songs ==
List of other charted songs, showing year of charting, selected chart positions, and originating album
Title	Year	Peak chart positions	Album
Title	Year	US Bub.	Album
"The Greatest Gift" (with Matteo and Virginia Bocelli	2022	11	A Family Christmas

== Videography ==
=== Video albums ===
List of video albums with descriptions
Title	Album details	Notes	Certifications
A Night in Tuscany	Released: November 10, 1998; Label: Philips (Universal); Format: DVD, VHS	A Night in Tuscany is the first DVD by Andrea Bocelli. It is of a concert he has in his native Tuscany, in 1997, highlighting the unique blend of Classical, Pop, and traditional Italian songs that made him a crossover success as an internationally acclaimed tenor. The concert takes place at the Piazza dei Cavalieri in Pisa. Bocelli performs two opera duets with soprano Nuccia Focile during the concert, before singing Miserere with Italian rock star Zucchero, who discovered him, and Time to Say Goodbye with English soprano Sarah Brightman.	AUS: Platinum; CAN: 2× Platinum; FRA: 2× Platinum; U.K.: Platinum; U.S.: 2× Platinum
Sacred Arias: The Home Video	Released: June 20, 2000; Label: Philips (Universal); Formats: DVD, VHS	Andrea Bocelli: The Home Video is the second DVD released by Andrea Bocelli. It was filmed in the Roman church of Santa Maria Sopra Minerva, in Rome, in 1999, where he gave a concert conducted by Myung-whun Chung, singing the arias of his previous album, Sacred Arias. Sacred Arias: Special Edition, a CD/DVD package, was released October 14, 2003, containing both, the album and the DVD as a bonus.	FRA: Gold; U.S.: Platinum
Tuscan Skies (Cieli di Toscana)	Released: January 15, 2002; Label: Philips (Universal); Format: DVD, VHS	Tuscan Skies (Cieli di Toscana) is the third DVD released by Italian tenor Andrea Bocelli. It contains music videos directed by Larry Weinstein, and filmed in Tuscany of Bocelli singing 10 song from his 2001 album, Cieli di Toscana, as a tribute to his home town and family.	
Credo: John Paul II	Released: July 6, 2006; Label: Warner Music; Formats: DVD, VHS	Credo: John Paul II is the fourth DVD released by Italian tenor, Andrea Bocelli, celebrating the life of pope John Paul II. The DVD contains footage of highlights of John Paul II's pontificate, his spiritual heritage, his most significant meetings with heads of states, but also his contact with people from all over the world, from the day of his election to his funeral. Throughout the DVD, Bocelli sings, in the background, songs from his 1999 album Sacred Arias.	
Under the Desert Sky	Released: November 7, 2006; Label: Decca, Sugar (Universal); Format: DVD, VHS	Under the Desert Sky is a DVD of a pop concert by classical Italian tenor Andrea Bocelli. The concert was performed on a specially built floating stage at Lake Las Vegas Resort (near Las Vegas, Nevada) and taped for American television network PBS. It mostly featured songs from Bocelli's previous album, Amore. The DVD also includes interviews about the Amore album, of Bocelli and producers, David Foster and Humberto Gatica, and was also nominated for an Emmy.	BRA: Platinum; U.K.: Gold; U.S.: Gold
Vivere Live in Tuscany	Released: January 29, 2008; Label: Decca, Sugar (Universal); Formats: DVD	Vivere Live in Tuscany is a DVD/Blu-ray Disc of a pop concert by classical Italian tenor Andrea Bocelli, following the release of his greatest hits album The Best of Andrea Bocelli: Vivere. The concert was performed at Bocelli's Teatro del Silenzio in Lajatico, Tuscany, July 5, 2007. In this DVD he performs duets with Sarah Brightman, Elisa, Laura Pausini and Heather Headley, and collaborates with Chris Botti and Lang Lang and Kenny G.	AUS: Gold; BRA: 3× Diamond
Incanto The Documentary	Released: November 4, 2008; Label: Decca, Sugar (Universal); Format: DVD	Incanto The Documentary, is a bonus DVD released alongside Bocelli's 2008 album Incanto, containing exclusive documentary footage, including an interview with Bocelli filmed in Naples, alongside a music video showcasing the Italian city in the 1950s. The video features rare clips of notable figures enjoying the romance of Naples in its heyday such as Elizabeth Taylor, Richard Burton, Sophia Loren, John F. Kennedy, among others. The album, released shortly after Bocelli's 50th birthday, is a personal tribute to the musical traditions of his homeland, featuring fourteen Neapolitan love songs of Bocelli's childhood.	
My Christmas Special	Released: December 8, 2010; Label: Decca, Sugar (Universal); Formats: DVD	The My Christmas Special is the DVD of the PBS Great Performances Christmas Special of Andrea Bocelli's first ever Holiday album, My Christmas, produced by multiple Grammy Award winner David Foster. The concert was filmed, September 15, 2009, at the Kodak Theatre in Los Angeles, featuring Bocelli and Foster with additional guests including Natalie Cole, Mary J. Blige, Reba McEntire, Katherine Jenkins, The Mormon Tabernacle Choir, and The Muppets.	
Concerto: One Night in Central Park	Released: November 15, 2011; Label: Decca, Sugar (Universal); Format: DVD	Concerto: One Night in Central Park is the DVD of Bocelli's concert at Central Park's Great Lawn, in New York, recorded September 15, 2011. Bocelli was accompanied by the New York Philharmonic, conducted by its music director Alan Gilbert, and guest performers included Celine Dion, Tony Bennett, Chris Botti, Bryn Terfel, and music producer David Foster. PBS broadcast the concert nationwide, as Andrea Bocelli Live in Central Park.	BRA: Gold; U.K.: Gold

=== Music videos ===
List of music videos, with the directors and years released
Year	Song	Director(s)
1995	"Il mare calmo della sera"	Fernando Garcia
1995	"Con te partirò"	Fernando Garcia
1995	"Per amore"	Fernando Garcia
1996	"Vivo por ella" (Portuguese version)	Marcello Bloisi
1996	"Vivo por ella" (Spanish version)	
1996	Time to Say Goodbye	
1997	"Ich lebe für sie"	
1997	"Je vis pour elle"	
1999	"Canto della Terra"	
1999	"'O Mare E Tu"	
1999	"Tremo E T'Amo"	
2001	"Melodramma"	Larry Weinstein
2001	"Il Mistero Dell'Amore"	Larry Weinstein
2001	"L'Incontro"	Larry Weinstein
2001	"L'Ultimo Re"	Larry Weinstein
2001	"L'Abitudine"	Larry Weinstein
2001	"Resta Qui"	Larry Weinstein
2001	"Mille Lune Mille Onde"	Larry Weinstein
2001	"Mascagni"	Larry Weinstein
2001	"Tornera la Neve"	Larry Weinstein
2001	"E Sara' A Settembre"	Larry Weinstein
2001	"E Mi Manchi Tu"	Larry Weinstein
2004	"Dell'amore non si sa"	
2004	"Un Nuovo Giorno"	
2006	"Mi Manchi"	
2008	"Dare to live (Vivere)"	Beniamino Catena
2015	"Nelle Tue Mani"	
2015	"E Più Ti Penso" (with Ariana Grande)	

== Bibliography ==
- 2000: The Music of Silence: A Memoir (La musica del silenzio) – Autobiography
- 2010: The Music of Silence: A Memoir – Reworked autobiography

== See also ==
- List of best-selling artists of all time
