= Popstar to Operastar series 2 =

Popstar to Operastar
- Series 2
- Hosted by: Myleene Klass
- Judges: Rolando Villazón; Katherine Jenkins; Vanessa-Mae; Simon Callow; Alfie Boe (Week 5)
- Winner: Joe McElderry
- Runner-up: Cheryl Baker

Release
- Original network: ITV
- Original release: 4 June – 10 July 2011

Series chronology
- ← Previous; Series 1

The second and final series of Popstar to Operastar began on 4 June 2011, with eight celebrities in competition to become an opera singer, after achieving success as a popstar. The judges were confirmed; with Rolando Villazón and Katherine Jenkins and two new judges Vanessa-Mae and Simon Callow, who took over the places of Meat Loaf and Laurence Llewelyn-Bowen. Myleene Klass returned as the presenter taking on sole presenting duties as Alan Titchmarsh did not return.

== Background ==
On 4 August 2010 Group Finance Manager, Ian Griffiths, confirmed at ITV's Interim Results Meeting that Popstar to Operastar had been recommissioned for a second series.

On 12 May 2011, Digital Spy revealed the full line-up for series 2: X Factor winner 2009 Joe McElderry, Ultravox frontman Midge Ure, Toploader's Joe Washbourn, Erasure's Andy Bell, Bucks Fizz's Cheryl Baker, The Pussycat Dolls' Melody Thornton, Steps' Claire Richards and US soul singer Jocelyn Brown.

In the same article it was confirmed that Myleene Klass would present Series 2 alone. Meat Loaf and Laurence Llewellyn-Bowen would be replaced as judges by Simon Callow and Vanessa Mae.

The second series aired on Sundays at 8pm. It began Sunday 5 June 2011, finishing its run on Sunday 10 July 2011.

== Popstars ==
Popstar	Solo/Group/Band	Status
Midge Ure	Ultravox/Soloist	Eliminated 1st on 5 June 2011
Jocelyn Brown	Soloist	Eliminated 2nd on 12 June 2011
Melody Thornton	Pussycat Dolls	Eliminated 3rd on 19 June 2011
Andy Bell	Erasure	Eliminated 4th on 26 June 2011
Joseph Washbourn	Toploader	Eliminated 5th on 3 July 2011
Claire Richards	Steps	Third place on 3 July 2011
Cheryl Baker	Bucks Fizz	Runner-up on 10 July 2011
Joe McElderry	Soloist	Winner on 10 July 2011

== Results summary ==
Colour key:

—	Indicates that the celebrity was immune from the vote (did not perform)
	Contestant was safe.
	Contestant was in the bottom two and had to sing again in the final showdown
	Contestant was in the bottom two and was immediately eliminated (no judges' vote)
	Contestant received the most public votes.

	Week 1	Week 2	Week 3	Week 4	Week 5	Week 6
Joe McElderry	1st 63.2%	—	1st 60.8%	1st 62.7%	1st 58.2%	Winner; 77.1%
Cheryl Baker	2nd 29.1%	—	3rd 13.0%	2nd 18.2%	2nd 19.2%	Runner-Up; 22.9%
Claire Richards	—	1st 54.5%	2nd 14.0%	3rd 7.7%	3rd 18.7%	Third Place (Week 5)
Joseph Washbourn	—	3rd 13.2%	5th 3.5%	4th 6.3%	4th 4.0%	Eliminated (Week 5)
Andy Bell	—	2nd 21.6%	4th 6.6%	5th 5.1%	Eliminated (Week 4)	
Melody Thornton	4th 2.1%	—	6th 2.2%	Eliminated (Week 3)		
Jocelyn Brown	—	4th 10.7%	Eliminated (Week 2)			
Midge Ure	3rd 5.7%	Eliminated (Week 1)				
Bottom two	Midge Ure; Melody Thornton	Jocelyn Brown; Joseph Washbourn	Joseph Washbourn; Melody Thornton	Andy Bell; Joseph Washbourn	No judges' vote: public votes alone decide who is eliminated and who ultimately wins	
Simon's vote to save	Melody Thornton	Jocelyn Brown	Joseph Washbourn	Joseph Washbourn	No judges' vote: public votes alone decide who is eliminated and who ultimately wins	
Vanessa's vote to save	Midge Ure	Joseph Washbourn	Melody Thornton	Joseph Washbourn	No judges' vote: public votes alone decide who is eliminated and who ultimately wins	
Rolando's vote to save	Midge Ure	Joseph Washbourn^{1}	Joseph Washbourn	Joseph Washbourn ^{1}	No judges' vote: public votes alone decide who is eliminated and who ultimately wins	
Katherine's vote to save	Melody Thornton^{1} ^{2}	Joseph Washbourn	Joseph Washbourn^{1}	Joseph Washbourn	No judges' vote: public votes alone decide who is eliminated and who ultimately wins	
Eliminated	Midge Ure; 2 of 4 votes Deadlock	Jocelyn Brown; 1 of 4 votes Majority	Melody Thornton; 1 of 4 votes Majority	Andy Bell; 0 of 4 votes Majority	Joseph Washbourn; 4.0% to save	Cheryl Baker; 22.9% to win
Eliminated	Midge Ure; 2 of 4 votes Deadlock	Jocelyn Brown; 1 of 4 votes Majority	Melody Thornton; 1 of 4 votes Majority	Andy Bell; 0 of 4 votes Majority	Claire Richards; 18.7% to save	Joe McElderry; 77.1% to win

^{1} Indicates that the casting vote would lie with that judge if the panel reached a split decision.
^{2} Indicates that the casting vote was required as the panel failed to reach a majority decision

=== Episodes ===
Voting percentages are from ITV.com

Most Public Votes
Eliminated
Bottom two

==== Week 1 ====
Performances

- Cheryl Baker: "Barcarole (Belle nuit, ô nuit d'amour)" from Tales of Hoffmann by Jacques Offenbach
- Joe McElderry: "Una furtiva lagrima" from Gaetano Donizetti
- Melody Thornton: "Habanera (L'amour est un oiseau rebelle)" from Carmen by Georges Bizet
- Midge Ure: "Questa o quella" from Rigoletto by Giuseppe Verdi

Did not perform (immune for week 1)

- Andy Bell
- Jocelyn Brown
- Claire Richards
- Joseph Washbourn

Bottom two

- Midge Ure - Eliminated on judges tied 2-2, with deciding vote given to Katherine Jenkins to save Melody Thornton
- Melody Thornton

Voting Results Rolando Villazón and Vanessa-Mae saved Midge Ure. Simon Callow and Katherine Jenkins saved Melody Thornton.

Guest Performers Katherine Jenkins - "Una voce poco fa" from The Barber of Seville by Gioachino Rossini

==== Week 2 ====
Performances

- Andy Bell: "'O sole mio" by Eduardo di Capua and Giovanni Capurro
- Jocelyn Brown: "Chanson Bohème (Les tringles des sistres tintaient)" from Carmen by Georges Bizet
- Claire Richards: "O mio babbino caro" from Gianni Schicchi by Giacomo Puccini
- Joseph Washbourn: "Toreador Song (Votre toast je peux vous le rendre)" from Carmen by Georges Bizet

Did not perform (immune for week 2)

- Cheryl Baker
- Joe McElderry
- Melody Thornton

Bottom two

- Jocelyn Brown - Eliminated on judges decision 3-1
- Joseph Washbourn

Voting Results Only Simon Callow voted to save Jocelyn Brown, with remaining three judges saving Joseph Washbourn

Guest Performers

- Rolando Villazón - "No puede ser"

==== Week 3 ====
Performances

- Cheryl Baker: "Je veux vivre" from Roméo et Juliette by Charles Gounod
- Andy Bell: "Non più andrai" from Marriage of Figaro by Mozart
- Joe McElderry: "La donna è mobile" from Rigoletto by Giuseppe Verdi
- Claire Richards: "Sempre libera" from La traviata by Giuseppe Verdi
- Melody Thornton: "Mon cœur s'ouvre à ta voix" from Samson et Dalila by Camille Saint-Saëns
- Joseph Washbourn: "Madamina, il catalogo è questo" from Don Giovanni by Mozart

Bottom two

- Melody Thornton - Eliminated on judges decision 3-1
- Joseph Washbourn

Voting Results Only Vanessa-Mae voted to save Melody Thornton, with remaining three judges saving Joseph Washbourn

Guest Performers

==== Week 4 ====
Performances

- Cheryl Baker: "Mein Herr Marquis (Adele's Laughing Song)" from Die Fledermaus by Johann Strauss II
- Andy Bell: "Largo al factotum" from The Barber of Seville by Rossini
- Joe McElderry: "Nessun dorma" from Turandot by Giacomo Puccini
- Claire Richards: "Casta diva" from Norma by Vincenzo Bellini
- Joseph Washbourn: "Torna a Surriento" by Giambattista De Curtis and Ernesto De Curtis

Bottom two

- Andy Bell - Eliminated by unanimous vote of the judges 4-0
- Joseph Washbourn

Guest Performers

==== Week 5 (Semi Final) ====
Performances

- Cheryl Baker: "Un bel di vedremo" from Madama Butterfly by Giacomo Puccini
- Joe McElderry: "Granada" by Agustín Lara
- Claire Richards: "Der Hölle Rache (the second Queen of the Night aria)" from The Magic Flute by Mozart
- Joseph Washbourn: "Fin ch'han dal vino (The Champagne Aria)" from Don Giovanni by Mozart
- Cheryl Baker / Joe McElderry (duet): "Canto della Terra" by Francesco Sartori and Lucio Quarantotto
- Claire Richards / Joseph Washbourn (duet): Con te partirò by Francesco Sartori and Lucio Quarantotto

Result

- Joseph Washbourn - Eliminated by public after receiving the fewest votes
- Claire Richards - Eliminated after finishing third in the public vote

Guest Performers

- Alfie Boe - "Who Am I" from Les Misérables

Note: Rolando Villazón was absent as a judge in this episode because of a concert he had in Switzerland. Therefore, opera tenor Alfie Boe filled in for him.

==== Week 6 (Final) ====
Performances

- Cheryl Baker: "The Flower Duet (Sous le dôme épais)" from Lakmé by Léo Delibes (a duet with Katherine Jenkins) and "Je veux vivre" from Roméo et Juliette by Charles Gounod (solo)
- Joe McElderry: "Musica proibita" (duet with Rolando Villazón) and "Nessun dorma" by Giacomo Puccini (solo)

Result

- Joe McElderry - Winner by public vote receiving 77.1% of the votes
- Cheryl Baker - Runner-up by public vote receiving 22.9% of the votes

Guest Performers

- Andrea Bocelli

== Ratings ==
Episode Viewing figures from Broadcasters' Audience Research Board (BARB).

Episode No.	Airdate	Total Viewers	ITV1 Weekly Ranking
0	4 June 2011	5,980,000	23
1	5 June 2011 (20:00)	4,260,000	29
2	5 June 2011 (22:05)	Under 3,620,000	Outside Top 30
3	12 June 2011 (20:00)	3,790,000	20
4	12 June 2011 (22:05)	Under 2,990,000	Outside Top 30
5	19 June 2011 (20:00)	3,070,000	22
6	19 June 2011 (22:05)	2,710,000	30
7	26 June 2011 (20:00)	2,870,000	29
8	26 June 2011 (22:05)	2,980,000	24
9	3 July 2011 (20:00)	3,010,000	22
10	3 July 2011 (22:05)	3,450,000	16
11	10 July 2011 (20:00)	3,470,000	17
12	10 July 2011 (22:05)	4,220,000	13

== Impact ==
After the show, Joe McElderry signed a record deal with label Decca, and it was announced he was to release an album of classics, to expose his operatic voice. The album was titled 'Classic' and it was released in August 2011 and charted at no.2, the highest chart position for an album Joe has ever released.
