= Kanon (singer) =

Japanese singer-songwriter (born 1980)

- Born: March 9, 1980 (age 46)
- Origin: Tokyo, Japan
- Genre: Classical crossover
- Occupations: Singer-songwriter; arranger; producer; voice actress
- Instruments: Vocals; piano
- Years active: 2003–present
- Label: Sony Music Japan International
- Website: kanonlove.com Kanon's official Twitter

Kanon (カノン; born March 9, 1980) is a Japanese singer-songwriter. She is signed to Sony Music Japan International.

Her latest mini album, My Road ~ Songs for Guin Saga was released on August 26, 2009. Her fifth album planned to be released on March 31, 2011, as she stated on her blog. But, somehow she postponed it. Her most recent album was released on April 27, 2011. The album's title is "A New Story"

== Biography ==
Kanon was born in Japan and lived much of her childhood abroad. Growing up in a western world led her to pick up many such habits and customs, one of which includes a fluent tongue in English. She began participating in a choir at age 13, in which she acquired a fair amount of interest in classical vocalization as well as vocal technique. Kanon grew to appreciate famous composers such as Handel and Chopin. Little did she know that this timely love of classical music would mature and blossom into what will become the cornerstone of her career as an artist.

She debuted in July 2002 with her first live performance shortly after graduating the Queensland Conservatorium in Australia. A year later, Kanon released [Alleluia], a mini-album containing various songs in her own piano self-accompaniment. That same year she was invited to perform live in Russia at the Moscow Baptist Church, the Red-Plaza stage, and at a home for the elderly. She was very popular with the crowds and was deemed a highly regarded Japanese representative. The first year-and-a-half of her career proved to be a fantastic display of vocal prowess, but also, in particular, lacked in original compositions. It wasn't until February 2004 when Kanon released the album [Hymn of Grace], this one being the first to include songs written and composed by her. Prior to this release she solely sang covers of songs (usually ones that fall under the category of popular folk songs) indigenous to various regions of the world.

Equipped with a beautiful face and a voice to match, Kanon aspired to reach the pinnacle of her potential, possibly out of a desire to far exceed the positive feedback from listeners all around the world. They say her voice is "one that heals," which is an accurate description considering her soothing vocals and extensive range. Sony Music Japan International recognized her talents and together they released her first single [KISEKI Song of Love] in October 2004.

The following year was busy, portentous to Kanon's promotion now that she had her newly signed contract under Sony Music. June 2005 opened up with her album [Primary Flowers] and an invitation to sing Japan's national anthem during the 2006 FIFA World Cup Germany-Asia public showing. She ended the year with a live performance in Tokyo in October.

In 2006, Kanon released three singles, Kokoro, My Destiny/Serenade, and Brand New Breeze. Her December album Sanctuary compiled her releases from this year along with several new tracks. She was invited to perform at MIDEM 2007, appearing as Japan's representative at the event. Her musi style is generally described as contemporary classical.

Tie-ins are also a part of Kanon's routine and plays in her overall promotion. Her song "Brand New Breeze" is being used in the opening sequence of the current anime Kiniro no Corda ~primo passo~. In the videogame industry, one of Kanon's most well-known endeavors is her collaboration with avex trax to aid in the completion of Namco's RPG Tales of Legendia, in which she sang as lead vocalist in a few of the games’ tracks. In fact, visiting the provided link will direct you to the game's official site, where a sample of one of those songs can be heard. One song in particular from the Tales of Legendia Original Soundtrack, "Tori wa Naki, Boku wa Utau" ("The Bird Chirps, I Sing"), has captivated fans across the globe, thus increasing the number of listeners to what it is today.

== Career ==
She debuted in 2003 with a mini album titled Alleluia -Piano & Voice-. As of year 2008, she already has 5 singles, 4 studio albums and 2 mini albums released and her latest appearance is at NHK Studio Park Kara Konnichiwa on March 19, 2008.

=== Collaborations ===
As for songs on her albums, she often does compositions herself, however occasionally collaborated with other composers such as Saint-Preux and Francesco Sartori.

== Discography ==
=== Singles ===
==== Wings to Fly～翼をください／虹／明日への鼓動 ====
- Wings to Fly～翼をください ＜作詞：山上路夫 作曲：村井邦彦 編曲・英語詞：カノン＞
- 虹 ＜作詞・作曲：カノン 編曲：北浦正尚＞
- 明日への鼓動 ＜作詞･作曲：カノン 編曲：スパム春日井＞
- Wings to Fly～翼をください [Instrumental]
- 虹 [Instrumental]
- 明日への鼓動 [Instrumental]

==== Kiseki Song of Love ====
This single is released on October 20, 2004, while the catalogue number is SICL-95.

- Kiseki Song of Love Miracle Song of Love (キセキ Song of Love)
  - Composition/lyrics: Kanon
- Memories of Summer time
  - English lyrics: Kanon
- Kiseki Song of Love (Instrumental)
- Memories of Summer time (Instrumental)

==== Gloria ====
- Gloria
  - Composition/lyrics: Kanon
- Wings to fly ~ Tsubasa wo Kudasai (Wings to fly ~ 翼をください)
  - Arrangement/English lyrics: Kanon
- Gloria (Instrumental)
- Angel Heart(Anime by Tsukasa Hōjō) Soundtrack

==== Kokoro ====
- Kokoro Heart (こころ)
- Kiseki Song of Love (Piano Version)
- Kokoro (Instrumental)

==== My Destiny/Serenade ====
It was released on May 24, 2006, and the catalogue number is SICL-139.

- My Destiny
  - Composition/arrangement/lyrics: Kanon
- Serenade
  - Composition/lyrics: Kanon
- My Destiny (Instrumental)
- Serenade (Instrumental)

==== Brand New Breeze ====
This is released on November 22, 2006, catalogue number is SICL-149.

- Brand New Breeze
  - Composition/lyrics: Kanon
- The Power
  - Composition/arrangement/lyrics: Kanon
- Brand New Breeze (Instrumental)
- The Power (Instrumental)

=== Studio albums ===
==== Hymn of Grace ====
Released on February 18, 2004; catalogue number VCCM-2001.

- El Shaddai (エルシャダイ) – Kanon
- Gloria – Kanon
- Fuyu ~Shiki Yori~ (冬～四季より～, "Winter", Four Seasons) – Antonio Vivaldi
- The water is wide – English Folk Lullaby
- Scarborough Fair (スカボローフェア) – Irish Folk Lullaby
- Anata no Koe ni Kokoro wa Hiraku (Mon cœur s'ouvre à ta voix) from the opera Samson and Delilah – Yori (あなたの声に心は開く-オペラ「サムソンとデリラ」より)
- Calling you – Bob Telson
- Ave Maria – Schubert
- Ave Maria – Kanon
- Loving Grace – Kanon
- The Light – Kanon
- Pie Jesu (ピエ・イエズ) – Andrew Lloyd Webber

==== Primary Flowers ====
Released on June 22, 2005, catalogue number: SICL-110.

- My Name is...
  - Composer/arranger: Kanon
- Kiseki Song of Love
- Anata e (あなたへ; For you)
  - Composition/arrangement/lyrics: Kanon
- Wings to fly ~ Tsubasa wo Kudasai (cathedral version)
  - English lyrics: Kanon
- Believe
  - Composition/arrangement/lyrics: Kanon
- Theme from Vocalise (Interlude)
- Futari Two of us (フタリ)
  - Composition: Saint-Preux
- Gloria
- Tenderly
  - Composition/lyrics: Kanon
- Can't Help Falling in Love
  - Luigi Creatore/George David Weiss/Hugo Peretti
  - Arranger: Kanon
- Daiya Mondo (ダイヤモンド)
  - Composition/lyrics: Kanon
- SHINE
- Lullabye (Good Night My Angel)

==== Sanctuary ====
Released on November 28, 2007, catalogue number is SICL-173.

- Brand New Breeze (based on Elgar's Salut d'Amour
- The Power
- Blue (based on Gershwin's Rhapsody in Blue
- Composition/arrangement/lyrics: Kanon
- Kokoro (album mix) (based on Beethoven's Piano Sonata No. 8 (Beethoven)
  - Composition/arrangement/lyrics: Kanon
- Subete Everything (すべて)
  - Composition/lyrics: Kanon
- Tsuki Moon (月) (based on Debussy's Clair De Lune
  - Composition/arrangement/lyrics: Kanon
- A Parting Blessing (Interlude) (Traditional)
- My Destiny (based on Rachmanioff's Vocalise
- Good Old Days
  - Composition/arrangement/lyrics: Kanon
- Serenade (album mix) (based on Tchaikovsky's Serenade for Strings (Tchaikovsky)
  - Composition/arrangement/lyrics: Kanon
- If Ye Love Me
  - Composer: Thomas Tallis
- As One
  - Composition/lyrics: Kanon
- Life
  - Composition/arrangement/lyrics: Kanon

==== Precious ====
This album was released on November 18, 2007, and the catalogue number is SICL-173

- (Kyrie ~荒野の果てに)
  - Composition/arrangement/lyrics: Kanon
- (都会の天使たちへ featuring Tetsuya Bessho)
  - Composition/lyrics: Kanon
- Let It Snow featuring WISE
  - Composer: Kanon
  - Lyricist: Kanon, WISE
- Brand New Breeze featuring Stella Quintet Players Side
  - Composition/lyrics: Kanon
- You Raise Me Up
- Carry On
  - Composition/arrangement/lyrics: Kanon
- Nella Fantasia
  - Composer: Ennio Morricone
  - Lyricist: Chiara Ferrau
  - Arranger: Kanon
- Time To Say Goodbye
  - Composer: Francesco Sartori
  - Lyricist: Lucio Quarantotto/English lyrics: Frank Peterson
- (Eternity ~悠久 ~ featuring上松美香)
  - Lyricist: Kanon
- O Come All ye faithful (traditional)
- Kiseki Song of Love featuring Stella Quintet Players Side
  - Composition/lyrics: Kanon
- Christmas Medley

==== A New Story ====
This album was released on April 27, 2011. Collaboration album release from Kanon and Nobuo Uematsu ("Final Fantasy" series). Features tracks from "Final Fantasy" series. The catalogue number is SICL-239

- Prelude (プレリュード (FINAL FANTASY Seriesより))
- Final Fantasy Main Theme (ファイナルファンタジー (FINAL FANTASY Seriesより))
- You Are The Light
- Eyes On Me (Final Fantasy Series)
- Far Away
- Guin Saga Medley
- Taisetsu na Koto (大切なこと)
- Nakama Wo Motomete (仲間を求めて)
- Shalom
- Blessed by the Light
- Wings to Fly (remix version)
- Toberu Mono (翔べるもの)

=== Mini albums ===
==== Alleluia -Piano and Voice- ====
This album was released on July 2, 2003. It was her debut album. The singer herself did all songs in this album, its composition and lyrics, except for Alleluia (Arranged version). The catalogue number is MSCV-2007

- Alleluia
- By being yourself
- Your Love
- Saigo (さいご)
- Alleluia (Arranged version)

==== Destiny ====
Released on October 26, 2005, catalogue number is SICL-124

- Destiny
  - Composition/arrangement/lyrics: Kanon
- Sanctus
  - Composition/arrangement/lyrics: Kanon
- Lascia ch'io pianga (English Hymn version)
  - Composer: G.F Handel
  - Arranger: Kanon
- Gloria (English version)
  - Composition/lyrics: Kanon
- My Destiny
- SHINE -tranquilizer mix- remixed by TOMISIRO

==== My Road~ Songs for Guin Saga ====
Released on August 26, 2009. The album contained songs for an anime : Guin Saga

- Saga~This is My Road
- Mariusu no Uta(マリウスの歌)
- Saga~This is My Road (Orgel Version)
- Where'er you go~Cavalleria Rustican
- Todokanu Omoi~Moonlight(届かぬ想い～Moonlight)
- Where'er you go~Cavalleria Rusticana (Orgel Version)
- Saga~This is My Road (English Version)

== Notes ==
- Kiseki Song of Love was chosen as J-WAVE GOOD MORNING TOKYO's Olympic theme.
- The single Kokoro is the campaign song for the movie, Duelist
- My Destiny is the third ending for the anime series, Angel Heart and her other single, Gloria/Serenade is the insert song for the same series as well.
- Brand New Breeze became the opening theme for the anime series, Kin’iro no Corda ~primo passo~. Furthermore, she guest starred in episode 24 as herself.
- As One, one of the tracks in her album, Sanctuary is the theme song for NHK's program, Autumn's 3 Biggest Open Groove 2006.
- (都会の天使たちへ featuring Tetsuya Bessho) has been featured in the Japanese broadcast of the TV drama series, Brothers and Sisters.
- Wings to Fly ~ Tsubasa o Kudasai is an insert song for the NHK TV novel, Chiri to Techin.

== Appearances ==
=== TV ===
- NHK Studio Park Kara Konnichiwa – March 19, 2008

=== TV animation ===
- Kin'iro no Corda ~primo passo~ – Guest starred as herself
- Guin Saga Ending Song – This is my Road

=== Live ===
- Final Fantasy Distant World's Concert Guest Vocalist in Sydney, Singing Suteki Da Ne and Distant Worlds ~ April 15, 2011, and April 16, 2011.
