= Popstar to Operastar series 1 =

Popstar to Operastar
- Series 1
- Hosted by: Myleene Klass (ITV1); Alan Titchmarsh
- Judges: Rolando Villazón; Katherine Jenkins; Meat Loaf; Laurence Llewelyn-Bowen
- Winner: Darius Campbell
- Runner-up: Bernie Nolan

Release
- Original network: ITV
- Original release: 15 January – 19 February 2010

Series chronology
- Next → Series 2

Popstar to Operastar was a British television music competition to find new singing talent in Opera. The show began on 15 January 2010 and finished on 19 February 2010. The show has eight popstars which took part within the competition battled each other learning opera. The judges were Rolando Villazón, Katherine Jenkins, Meat Loaf and Laurence Llewelyn-Bowen. The winner of the show was Darius Campbell and with the runner-up being Bernie Nolan.

== Popstars ==
Popstar	Solo/Group/Band	Status
Alex James	Blur (Bass guitarist)	Eliminated 1st on 15 January 2010
Vanessa White	The Saturdays	Eliminated 2nd on 22 January 2010
Jimmy Osmond	The Osmonds	Eliminated 3rd on 29 January 2010
Danny Jones	McFly	Eliminated 4th on 5 February 2010
Kym Marsh	Soloist/Hear'Say	Eliminated 5th on 12 February 2010
Marcella Detroit	Shakespears Sister	Third place on 12 February 2010
Bernie Nolan	The Nolans	Runner-up on 19 February 2010
Darius Campbell	Soloist	Winner on 19 February 2010

== Results summary ==
Colour key:

–	Contestant was in the bottom two and had to sing again in the final showdown
–	Contestant was in the bottom two and was immediately eliminated (no judges' vote)
–	Contestant received the most public votes

	Week 1	Week 2	Week 3	Week 4	Week 5	Week 6
Darius Campbell	1st 26.4%	2nd 21.4%	3rd 15.3%	2nd 24.0%	2nd 20.9%	Winner; 50.1%
Bernie Nolan	2nd 23.9%	1st 24.0%	1st 32.7%	1st 25.3%	1st 47.8%	Runner up 49.9%
Marcella Detroit	5th 9.9%	4th 13.1%	2nd 16.9%	4th 15.1%	3rd 17.8%	Third place (Week 5)
Kym Marsh	3rd 12.1%	3rd 19.0%	4th 13.3%	2nd 24.0%	4th 13.5%	Eliminated (Week 5)
Danny Jones	4th 10.2%	5th 10.7%	5th 11.5%	5th 11.6%	Eliminated (Week 4)	
Jimmy Osmond	6th 8.3%	6th 8.2%	6th 10.4%	Eliminated (Week 3)		
Vanessa White	7th 4.7%	7th 3.7%	Eliminated (Week 2)			
Alex James	8th 4.6%	Eliminated (Week 1)				
Bottom two	Alex James, Vanessa White	Jimmy Osmond, Vanessa White	Danny Jones, Jimmy Osmond	Danny Jones, Marcella Detroit	No judges' vote: public votes alone decide who is eliminated and who ultimately wins	
Meat Loaf's vote to save	Alex James	Jimmy Osmond	Danny Jones	Marcella Detroit	No judges' vote: public votes alone decide who is eliminated and who ultimately wins	
Jenkins' vote to save	Vanessa White	Jimmy Osmond	Danny Jones	Marcella Detroit	No judges' vote: public votes alone decide who is eliminated and who ultimately wins	
Villazón's vote to save	Vanessa White	Vanessa White	Danny Jones	Danny Jones	No judges' vote: public votes alone decide who is eliminated and who ultimately wins	
Llewelyn-Bowen's vote to save	Alex James	Vanessa White	Danny Jones	Danny Jones	No judges' vote: public votes alone decide who is eliminated and who ultimately wins	
Eliminated	Alex James; 2 of 4 votes Deadlock	Vanessa White; 2 of 4 votes Deadlock	Jimmy Osmond; 0 of 4 votes Majority	Danny Jones; 2 of 4 votes Deadlock	Kym Marsh; 13.5% to save	Bernie Nolan; 49.9% to win
Eliminated	Alex James; 2 of 4 votes Deadlock	Vanessa White; 2 of 4 votes Deadlock	Jimmy Osmond; 0 of 4 votes Majority	Danny Jones; 2 of 4 votes Deadlock	Marcella Detroit; 17.8% to save	Darius Campbell; 50.1% to win

== Episodes ==
Voting percentages are from ITV.com.

Most Public Votes
Eliminated
Bottom two

=== Week 1 ===
Performances

Order	Artist	Song	Results
1	Jimmy Osmond	"’O sole mio"	Safe (8.3%)
2	Kym Marsh	"Si Un Jour"	Safe (12.1%)
3	Alex James	"Largo al factotum" from The Barber of Seville	Eliminated (4.6%)
4	Marcella Detroit	"Casta diva" from Norma	Safe (9.9%)
5	Danny Jones	"La donna è mobile" from Rigoletto	Safe (10.2%)
6	Vanessa White	"O mio babbino caro" from Gianni Schicchi	Bottom two (4.7%)
7	Darius Campbell	"Nessun dorma" from Turandot	Safe (26.4%)
8	Bernie Nolan	"Belle nuit, ô nuit d'amour" (The Barcarole) from The Tales of Hoffmann	Safe (23.9%)

Bottom two

- Alex James - Eliminated on judges tied, lowest viewer votes
- Vanessa White

Voting Results Rolando Villazón and Katherine Jenkins saved Vanessa. Meat Loaf and Laurence Llewelyn-Bowen saved Alex.

Guest Performers

- Camilla Kerslake sang "How Can I Keep from Singing?" accompanied by Gary Barlow on piano.

=== Week 2 ===
Performances

Order	Artist	Song	Results
1	Jimmy Osmond	"Volare"	Bottom two (8.2%)
2	Kym Marsh	"Libiamo ne' lieti calici" ("Brindisi") from La traviata	Safe (19.0%)
3	Marcella Detroit	"Un bel dì vedremo" from Madama Butterfly	Safe (13.1%)
4	Danny Jones	"Caruso"	Safe (10.7%)
5	Vanessa White	"Summertime" from Porgy and Bess	Eliminated (3.7%)
6	Darius Campbell	"Votre toast, je peux vous le rendre" ("Toreador Song") from Carmen	Safe (21.4%)
7	Bernie Nolan	"Parla più piano" (Italian version of "Speak Softly, Love") from The Godfather	Safe (24.0%)

Bottom two

- Vanessa White - Eliminated on judges tied, lowest viewer votes
- Jimmy Osmond

Guest Performer

- Katherine Jenkins sang "Chanson Bohème" from Carmen.

=== Week 3 ===
Performances

Order	Artist	Song	Results
1	Kym Marsh	"Habanera" from Carmen	Safe (13.3%)
2	Jimmy Osmond	"Amor ti vieta" (Love Forbids You) from Fedora	Eliminated (10.4%)
3	Marcella Detroit	"Second Queen of the Night aria" from The Magic Flute	Safe (16.9%)
4	Danny Jones	"Con te partirò" ("Time to Say Goodbye")	Bottom two (11.5%)
5	Darius Campbell	"Granada"	Safe (15.3%)
6	Bernie Nolan	"Voi che sapete" ("You Ladies Who Know What Love Is") from The Marriage of Figaro	Safe (32.7%)

Bottom two

- Jimmy Osmond - Eliminated by judges
- Danny Jones

Voting Results Three judges voted to save Danny Jones. Since a majority of votes were cast one way Katherine Jenkins did not vote, but stated that she also would have voted for Jones to stay.

Guest Performer

- Rolando Villazón sang Tosti's "L'alba separa dalla luce l'ombra".

=== Week 4 ===
Performances

Order	Artist	Song	Results
1	Bernie Nolan	"Les Filles de Cadix" by Delibes	Safe (25.3%)
2	Danny Jones	"Funiculì, Funiculà" by Peppino Turco	Eliminated (11.6%)
3	Kym Marsh	"Nella Fantasia", music by Ennio Morricone	Safe (24.0%)
4	Darius Campbell	"Non più andrai" ("No More Gallivanting") from Marriage of Figaro by Mozart	Safe (24.0%)
5	Marcella Detroit	"Ave maria" by Schubert	Bottom two (15.1%)

Bottom two

- Danny Jones - Eliminated by public votes after judges were dead-locked
- Marcella Detroit

Voting Results Meat Loaf and Katherine Jenkins saved Marcella Detroit. Rolando Villazón and Laurence Llewelyn-Bowen saved Danny Jones.

Guests Performers

- Mika and Danielle de Niese sang "Rain".

=== Week 5 (Semi Final) ===
Performances

Order	Artist	Song	Results
1	Kym Marsh	"Pie Jesu" from Gabriel Fauré's Requiem Mass	Eliminated (13.5%)
2	Darius Campbell	"Fin ch'han dal vino" from Don Giovanni	Safe (20.9%)
3	Marcella Detroit	"Mein Herr Marquis" ("Laughing Song") by Johann Strauss	3rd Place (17.8%)
4	Bernie Nolan	"Je veux vivre" from Roméo et Juliette	Safe (47.8%)

Bottom two

- Kym Marsh - Eliminated
- Marcella Detroit - 3rd Place

Both Eliminated by public votes

Guest Performers

- Meat Loaf and Juliette Pochin sang "Bat Out of Hell".

=== Week 6 (Final) ===
Performances

Order	Artist	Song
1	Darius Campbell	"Non piú andrai" ("No More Gallivanting") from Marriage of Figaro by Mozart
2	Bernie Nolan	"Les Filles de Cadix" by Delibes
3	Darius Campbell & Rolando Villazón	"The Impossible Dream" from Man of La Mancha
4	Bernie Nolan & Katherine Jenkins	"Somewhere" from West Side Story
5	Darius Campbell, Bernie Nolan, Rolando Villazón & Katherine Jenkins	"Libiamo ne' lieti calici" ("Brindisi") from La traviata

Final Result

Popstar	Result
Bernie Nolan	Runner-Up (49.9%)
Darius Campbell	Winner (50.1%)

Darius Campbell was declared the winner with 50.1% of the public votes and closed the show with a rendition of Non piú andrai.

== Ratings ==
Episode Viewing figures from Broadcasters' Audience Research Board (BARB).

Episode No.	Airdate	Total Viewers	ITV1 Weekly Ranking
1	15 January 2010	4,290,000	28
2	22 January 2010	3,900,000	30
3	29 January 2010	3,690,000	28
4	5 February 2010	4,010,000	25
5	12 February 2010	4,660,000	20
6	19 February 2010	4,330,000	22
