= Tuscan Skies =

Tuscan Skies (Cieli di Toscana)

Video by Andrea Bocelli
- Released: 15 January 2002
- Length: 117:00
- Language: Italian
- Label: Philips
- Director: Larry Weinstein

Tuscan Skies (Cieli di Toscana) is the third DVD released by Italian tenor Andrea Bocelli.

It contains music videos filmed in Tuscany of Bocelli singing 10 songs from his 2001 album, Cieli di Toscana, as a tribute to his home town and family.

== Music videos ==
| Songs | Director(s) |
|---|---|
| "Melodramma" | Larry Weinstein |
| "Il mistero dell'amore" | Larry Weinstein |
| "L'incontro" | Larry Weinstein |
| "L'ultimo re" | Larry Weinstein |
| "L'abitudine" | Larry Weinstein |
| "Resta qui" | Larry Weinstein |
| "Mille lune mille onde" | Larry Weinstein |
| "Mascagni" | Larry Weinstein |
| "Tornerà la neve" | Larry Weinstein |
| "E sarà a settembre" | Larry Weinstein |
| "E mi manchi tu" | Larry Weinstein |
