= Because We Believe (Ama credi e vai) =

2006 single by Andrea Bocelli

"Because We Believe" "(Ama credi e vai)"

Single by Andrea Bocelli, Bocelli featuring Marco Borsato, and Bocelli featuring Gianna Nannini

from the album Amore, The Best of Andrea Bocelli: Vivere, Symphonica in Rosso (Borsato album)
- Released: 15 February 2006 (Netherlands and Flanders); March 2006 (Italy)
- Recorded: 2006
- Genre: Operatic pop, pop
- Length: 4:37 (duet with Borsato)
- Label: Universal Music, Decca, Sugar
- Songwriters: Andrea Bocelli, David Foster, Amy Foster
- Producers: David Foster, Humberto Gatica

Andrea Bocelli singles chronology
"Somos Novios (It's Impossible)" (2006)	"Because We Believe" (2006)	"Ama credi e vai" (2006)

Andrea Bocelli singles chronology
"Because we Believe" (2006)	"Ama credi e vai" (2006)	"Dare to Live" (2007)

Marco Borsato singles chronology
"Wat Zou Je Doen" (2004)	"Because We Believe" (2006)	"Rood" (2007)

"Because We Believe", (Italian: "Ama credi e vai") is a song by Italian pop tenor Andrea Bocelli. It was co-written by Bocelli, multiple Grammy Award winner David Foster and his daughter Amy Foster, for the closing ceremony of the 2006 Winter Olympics in Turin, where it was performed by Bocelli. The song first appeared as a solo version in Bocelli's 2006 album Amore, and later in his 2007, greatest hits album, The Best of Andrea Bocelli: Vivere.

== Releases ==
=== Solo version ===
In the United States, Canada, and the rest of the world outside of Europe, Bocelli's original solo version is by far the best known. Young Argentinian tenor Javier Fontana also recorded the song with approval. Bocelli usually performs Because We Believe, the part English/Italian version of the song, during concerts and events, although he sometimes performs "Ama credi e vai", the song with the Italian lyrics only, which he wrote himself.

Both "Ama credi e vai", and "Because We Believe", were released as part of the Amore album, January 31, 2006, which debuted at No. 3 on both the Billboard 200, and the Canadian albums charts.

On February 26, 2006, Bocelli performed the multilingual version of the song during the closing ceremony of the 2006 Winter Olympics, in Turin, before the flame was extinguished. While Bocelli was singing, 500 Italian brides entered the arena dressed in their wedding dresses, and carrying lighted lilies; they formed the "Dove of Peace" before the flame took its final breath.

In April 2006, Bocelli was a guest coach, along with David Foster, on Season 5 of American Idol, helping the finalists sing the week's themed songs, "Greatest Love Songs." He performed "Because We Believe" on the week's results show.

The song was also included in Bocelli's 2007, greatest hits album, The Best of Andrea Bocelli: Vivere.

On March 18, 2006, "Because We Believe" debuted at No. 39, on the U.S. Adult Contemporary chart, spending only one week on the chart.

=== Marco Borsato duet ===
In the Netherlands and Flanders, Belgium, the song was released as a duet with Dutch Nederpop singer Marco Borsato. Borsato recorded his part in Dutch, English, and Italian in Bocelli's studio in Italy, and Bocelli's original vocals were used.

The single spent a total of 14 weeks on the Dutch Top 40 chart, including six weeks at No. 1, becoming Borsato's first English language No. 1 single in the Netherlands as well as Bocelli's first No. 1 single in the country.

In Flanders, the single picked at No. 4, Bocelli's best position in Flanders since "Con te partirò" topped the charts in 1996, for 10 consecutive weeks. The song eventually spent a total of 21 weeks on the Ultratop 50 chart, seven weeks longer than it did in the Netherlands.

=== Gianna Nannini duet ===
In Italy, the Italian version of the song was released as a duet with Italian rock singer Gianna Nannini.

The single spent a total of 14 weeks on the Musica e dischi, Italian single Top 50 chart, picking at No. 9, and a total of 4 weeks in the top 20 on the FIMI singles chart, picking at No. 11.

== Chart ==
=== Weekly charts ===
==== Duet with Marco Borsato ====
Chart (2006)	Peak position
Belgium (Ultratop 50 Flanders)	4
Netherlands (Dutch Top 40)	1
Netherlands (Single Top 100)	1

==== Duet with Gianna Nannini ====
Chart (2006)	Peak position
Musica e dischi Italy	9
FIMI Italy	11

=== Year-end charts ===
==== Duet with Marco Borsato ====
Chart (2006)	Position
Belgium (Ultratop Flanders)	25
Netherlands (Dutch Top 40)	16
Netherlands (Single Top 100)	5

=== Decade-end charts ===
==== Duet with Marco Borsato ====
Chart (2000–09)	Position
Netherlands (Single Top 100)	76

== Cover versions ==
The song has since been recorded by The Canadian Tenors, for their 2009 self-titled debut album.

The song has also been recorded by Celtic Thunder. It is featured on their third album Take Me Home released in 2009, and is sung by former member Paul Byrom

On February 5, 2012, American pop opera singer, Chris Mann, auditioned with his version of the song for the premiere of the second season of the NBC talent show, The Voice. Even though Cee Lo Green was the first to turn his chair around, Chris chose Christina Aguilera as his coach. When Green asked about the song choice, Chris said he always loved the song. He went on to say that he had a hard time in the business, eventually trying to shrink his voice to "fit in." For the show, Chris said he wanted to sing like himself.

Harrison Craig, born 1994, Australian singer, Winner of the Voice, 2013, also sings a version of this song.
