= Living So Italian =

Unreleased song by Jay-Z and Kanye West

Unreleased song by Jay-Z and Kanye West
- Recorded: 2011
- Genre: Mafioso rap
- Length: 3:06
- Producer: Karlyle

"Living So Italian" is an unreleased song by the American rappers Jay-Z and Kanye West. It was recorded for their 2011 collaborative album Watch the Throne, but excluded following sample clearance problems. Produced by Karlyle, "Living So Italian" is built on a sample of Andrea Bocelli's "Por ti volaré" (1995) and features Jay-Z and West flaunting their international lifestyles, referencing stereotypes of Italians. The lyrics incorporate mafia terminology and reference famous Italian-American figures.

Jay-Z played "Living So Italian" during a private listening session for reporters and music journalists in July 2011. Journalists regarded it as a potential Watch the Throne highlight, but it was not included on the album because Jay-Z and West could not clear the sample. "Living So Italian" became sought after by fans, and excerpts surfaced periodically before the full track leaked on October 7, 2026.

== Background and recording ==
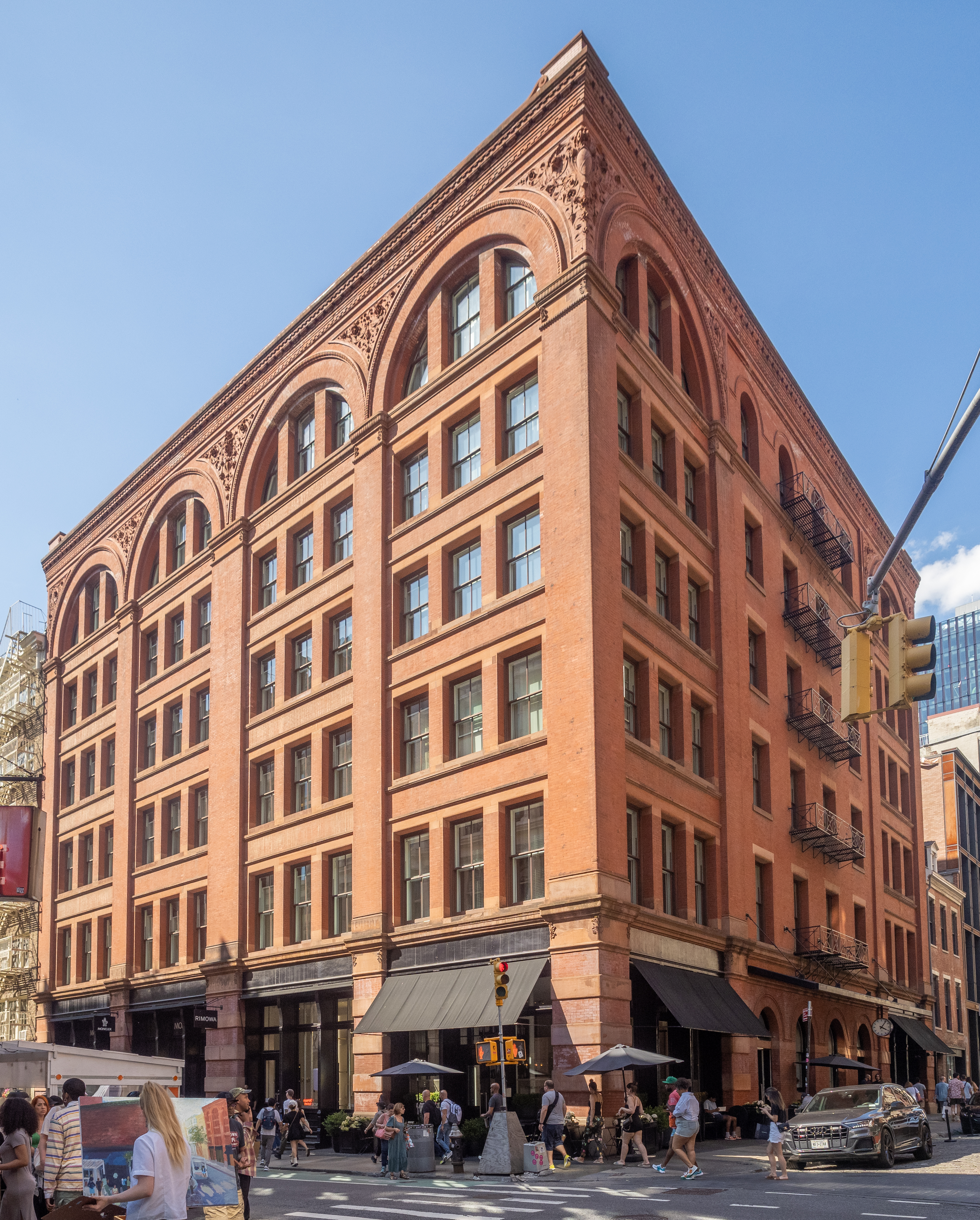
"Living So Italian" was played during a private listening session by Jay-Z at the Mercer Hotel (pictured).

The American rappers Jay-Z and Kanye West began working on their collaborative album Watch the Throne (2011) in 2010. West announced it as a five-track EP in October. Later that month, he revealed it had been expanded into a full-length album, and that recording would take place in the south of France.

Produced by Karlyle, "Living So Italian" originated during early Watch the Throne sessions, when the album initially focused on braggadocio and luxury. The instrumental, which the rapper Lil B previously used for a track on his mixtape Red Flame (2010), had been given to West's producer Mike Dean, who brought it to the Watch the Throne sessions. When West, Jay-Z, and the American actor Aziz Ansari were watching a basketball game, Jay-Z conceived a rap and began whispering a "long" and "complicated" verse, which he used for "Living So Italian".

Following criticism of the lead single, "H.A.M.", Jay-Z and West reworked Watch the Throne, but intended to keep "Living So Italian". It appeared on an early Watch the Throne track list, and Jay-Z played it during a private listening session for reporters and music journalists at the Mercer Hotel in New York City on July 7, 2011. Jay-Z described "Living So Italian" as fun for him and West to record. It was not included on the album because Jay-Z and West were unable to clear its sample, an excerpt from "Por ti volaré", the Spanish version of "Con te partirò" (1995) by the Italian singer Andrea Bocelli. Jay-Z repurposed his verse for "FuckWithMeYouKnowIGotIt" on his album Magna Carta Holy Grail (2013).

== Composition and lyrics ==
"Living So Italian" runs for three minutes and six seconds. It is built on a sample of "Por ti volaré". The sample is not chopped but rather, as Rolling Stone wrote, "sped down and mangled into an improbably heavy groove", with production that HotNewHipHop described as grand and "lavish[ly] European".

"Living So Italian" is a mafioso-themed track in which Jay-Z and West flaunt their international lifestyles and chant "living so Italian" against the sample during the chorus. Both, particularly Jay-Z, reference stereotypes of Italians. Jay-Z's verse, which Entertainment Weekly described as reminiscent of his persona on American Gangster (2007), incorporates mafia terminology, the Italian language, and references to Italian-American figures such as Robert De Niro, Lucky Luciano, and Al Pacino. West raps that he is about to "say something crazy" before naming the British fashion designer John Galliano.

== Leaks ==
"Living So Italian" became regarded as a prominent unreleased track and was sought after by fans. Pigeons & Planes wrote that, for West's fandom, "Living So Italian" was "one of the holy grails of his extensive unreleased catalogue... most still believed it was nearly impossible that a studio version would ever see the light of day". "A low-quality recording, which reportedly originated from the July 2011 listening session, leaked in May 2019. The recording contained half of the track, and Highsnobiety reported that a CD-quality version was not known to exist.

In 2026, someone who had acquired Jay-Z and West's Watch the Throne hard drives and discovered the "Living So Italian" file contacted a group of West fans. The fans started a US$23,000 crowdfunding campaign coordinated via the online messaging platform Discord, with bonus music leaks for other artists, including Akon, Destroy Lonely, Ed Sheeran, Future, JID, and Jim Legxacy, as fundraising milestones. After the fundraiser was completed, the full track leaked on October 7, 2026.

== Reception ==
"Living So Italian" received a positive response following its July 2011 preview. Complex wrote that the music journalists present considered it a potential Watch the Throne highlight. Entertainment Weekly said it represented "regal rap at its finest", Rolling Stone called it "very catchy", and GQ praised it as "hilarious [and] audacious". Complex and GQ highlighted West's Galliano line as memorable.

In 2015, Complex said they hoped that Jay-Z would release "Living So Italian" on his streaming service Tidal, which promoted "exclusive content" as a subscription incentive. They expressed disbelief that sample clearance was preventing its release due to Jay-Z and West's prominence and Jay-Z's ability to sample Courtney Love and R.E.M. recordings on Magna Carta Holy Grail. Discussing the leaked excerpt in 2019, HotNewHipHop wrote that Jay-Z's verse seemed "right at home over the lavish, grandiose instrumental". Following the 2026 leak, POW Mag wrote that "Living So Italian" was best left unreleased. While they felt that rapping over "Por ti volaré" was "the kind of masturbatory move that only a peak Kanye West would have thought of", they described the result as "so appalling Dante Alighieri would have died of laughter".
