= Mille lune mille onde =

Single by Andrea Bocelli

from the album Cieli di Toscana, The Best of Andrea Bocelli: Vivere
- Released: 2001
- Genre: Operatic pop, pop
- Length: 4:00
- Label: Decca, Sugar
- Songwriter(s): Francesco Sartori, Lucio Quarantotto, Claudio Corradini, David Foster

Andrea Bocelli singles chronology
"Melodramma" (2001)	"Mille lune mille onde" (2001)	"L'abitudine" (2001)

"Mille lune mille onde" ("A Thousand Moons, a Thousand Waves") is the second single from Italian pop tenor Andrea Bocelli's 2001 album, Cieli di Toscana. The song was written by Francesco Sartori, Claudio Corradini and Lucio Quarantotto, the writers of Bocelli's "Con te partirò" and "Canto della Terra", and by multiple Grammy Award winner David Foster, and is among Bocelli's most popular and well-known songs. The song is used in all of Barilla's pasta commercials.

The song was later included in Bocelli's 2007 greatest hits album, The Best of Andrea Bocelli: Vivere.
