= Vivere (Dare to Live) =

1996 single by Gerardina Trovato

Single by Gerardina Trovato

from the album Non è un film
- Released: 1996
- Recorded: 1994
- Genre: Pop
- Length: 4:01
- Label: Decca, Sugar
- Songwriters: Gerardina Trovato, Angelo Anastasio, Celso Valli
- Producer: Celso Valli

Gerardina Trovato singles chronology
""Energia Diretta"	"Vivere"	"Non ho più la mia città"

"Vivere" is a song written by Italian singer-songwriter Gerardina Trovato with Angelo Anastasio and Celso Valli. It was first recorded as a duet between Trovato and Italian pop tenor Andrea Bocelli and included in Trovato's 1994 album Non è un film as well as on Bocelli's debut album Il mare calmo della sera. It was also released as a B-side single with Bocelli's "Con te partirò" in 1996 and it was later featured on the compilation album Romanza, released by Bocelli in 1997.

In 2007, Bocelli, together with Italian singer Laura Pausini, recorded "Vive Ya (Dare to Live)" and "Vivere (Dare to Live)", two multilingual versions of "Vivere" in Spanish and Italian respectively, the latter featuring verses in English. The Spanish version was subsequently nominated for Record of the Year at the Latin Grammy Awards of 2008.

== Background ==
"Vivere" was composed by Italian singer-songwriter Gerardina Trovato for her second studio album, Non è un film, released in 1994. Trovato decided to invite Bocelli to record the song with her after meeting him at one of Zucchero Fornaciari's concerts, during which he performed the song "Miserere" in a duet with Zucchero. Bocelli and Trovato performed the song as a live duet during Trovato's 1994 Italian tour, to which Bocelli participated as a regular guest.

== Track listing ==
CD single – "Con te partirò" / "Vivere" (1996)

1. "Con te partirò" – 4:09
2. "Vivere" – 4:01

CD single – "Vivere"

1. "Vivere" – 4:01
2. "Misere" – 4:23
3. "Panis Angelicus" – 3:51

== 2007 version ==
"Vivere (Dare to Live)" / "Vive ya (Dare to Live)"

Single by Andrea Bocelli feat. Laura Pausini

from the album The Best of Andrea Bocelli: Vivere
- Released: 2 November 2007
- Genre: Pop
- Length: 4:18
- Label: Decca, Sugar
- Songwriters: Gerardina Trovato, Angelo Anastasio, Celso Valli
- Producers: Humberto Gatica, Tony Renis

Andrea Bocelli singles chronology
"Ama Credi E Vai" (2006)	"Vivere (Dare to Live)" / "Vive ya (Dare to Live)" (2007)	"What Child Is This" (2008)

Laura Pausini singles chronology
"La mia banda suona il rock" (2007)	"Vivere (Dare to Live)" (2007)	"Invece no" (2008)

Music video
- "Vivere (Dare to Live)" on YouTube

In 2007, Bocelli re-recorded the song under the title "Vivere (Dare to Live)", with Italian singer Laura Pausini dueting with him. Pausini performs her part of the song in English. This version of the track, produced by Humberto Gatica and Tony Renis, was included in Bocelli's second greatest hits album, The Best of Andrea Bocelli: Vivere, and it was released as a single in November 2007.

"Vive ya", a Spanish version of the duet, was later released as a single. It was nominated the following year, for Record of the Year at the Latin Grammy Awards of 2008.

=== Music video ===
The music video for the song was directed by Beniamino Catena and was produced by Paolo Soravia. The video promotes the "Progetto Vivere", a charity project supported by Action Aid against poverty. Partially shot in Africa, it shows different people bringing some water to a tree in the desert, using it as a metaphor representing the idea that poverty could be fought if everybody gives his own contribution. Beniamino Catena described the video claiming that:

"It is not only a music video, we created a small film, a daydream, clear and bright, which tells the path of some unknowns, coming from different areas of the world, roaming in a huge ocean of sand, looking for the only tree to water."

=== Live performances ===
In July 2007, the song was performed live by Bocelli and Pausini during Bocelli's concert at the Teatro del Silenzio in Lajatico. This performance was included in Bocelli's video album Vivere Live in Tuscany, released in 2008.

Bocelli and Pausini sang the Spanish-language version of the song during the 8th Latin Grammy Awards, on 8 November 2007 at the Mandalay Bay Events Center in Las Vegas, Nevada, Nevada.

On 22 January 2008, Pausini and Bocelli dueted again performing "Vivere (Dare to Live)" during the Telegatto Awards, broadcast in Italy by Canale 5.

=== Track listing ===
Digital download – "Vivere (Dare to Live)"

1. "Vivere (Dare to Live)" – 4:18

Digital download – "Vive ya (Dare to Live)"

1. "Vive ya (Dare to Live)" – 4:18

=== Chart performance ===
"Vivere (Dare to Live)"

Chart (2008)	Peak position
Italy (FIMI)	17

"Vive ya (Dare to Live)"

Chart (2008)	Peak position
US Hot Latin Songs (Billboard)	20
US Latin Pop Airplay (Billboard)	6

=== Release history ===
Region	Date	Format	Version
Spain	2 November 2007	Digital download	"Vive ya (Dare to Live)"
United Kingdom	2 November 2007	Digital download	"Vivere (Dare to Live)"
Italy	18 January 2008	Airplay	"Vivere (Dare to Live)"
