= The Best of Andrea Bocelli: Vivere =

2007 greatest hits album by Andrea Bocelli

Greatest hits album by Andrea Bocelli
- Released: 22 October 2007
- Genre: Classical; pop
- Length: 68:45
- Language: Italian; English; Spanish
- Label: Decca; Sugar Records
- Producer: David Foster

Andrea Bocelli chronology
Amore (2006)	The Best of Andrea Bocelli: Vivere (2007)	Incanto (2008)

The Best of Andrea Bocelli: Vivere is the first greatest hits album released by Italian tenor Andrea Bocelli. It includes five new studio recordings and was internationally released by Sugar on 22 October 2007.

The song "Vive Ya", (Spanish version of "Dare to live (Vivere)") was nominated for Record of the Year at the Latin Grammy Awards of 2008. In August 2010, 3 years after its release, the album topped the charts in Poland.

The Spanish version of the album is named Lo Mejor de Andrea Bocelli: Vive Ya. In Japan the album was released on 19 March 2008 as Time to Say Goodbye: Bocelli Super Best and included two bonus tracks.

== Track listing ==
1. "La Voce Del Silenzio" (The Voice of Silence) - 4:55
2. "Sogno" (Dream) - 4:00
3. "Il mare calmo della sera" (The Calm Sea of the Evening) - 4:39
4. "Dare to live (Vivere)" (feat. Laura Pausini) - 4:18
5. "Canto della Terra" (Song of the Earth) - 3:59
6. "A Te" (To You, feat. Kenny G) - 4:09
7. "Bésame Mucho" (Kiss Me A Lot) - 4:02
8. "Mille Lune Mille Onde" (A Thousand Moons, a Thousand Waves) - 3:59
9. "Time to Say Goodbye" (Con te partirò)" (feat. Sarah Brightman) - 4:05
10. "Io ci sarò" (I'll Be There, feat. Lang Lang) - 4:49
11. "Romanza" (Romance) - 3:42
12. "Vivo per lei" (I Live for Her, feat. Giorgia) - 4:25
13. "Melodramma" - 4:07
14. "Bellissime stelle" (Beautiful Stars) - 4:14
15. "The Prayer" (feat. Celine Dion) - 4:27
16. "Because We Believe" (feat. Marco Borsato) - 4:40

Japan bonus tracks

17. "Somos Novios (It's Impossible)" (feat. Rimi Natsukawa)
18. "Dell'amore non si sa" (feat. Hayley Westenra)

== Charts ==
=== Weekly charts ===
Chart (2007–08)	Peak position
Australian Albums (ARIA)	11
Austrian Albums (Ö3 Austria)	13
Belgian Albums (Ultratop Flanders)	12
Belgian Albums (Ultratop Wallonia)	10
Canadian Albums (Billboard)	8
Danish Albums (Hitlisten)	5
Dutch Albums (Album Top 100)	3
Finnish Albums (Suomen virallinen lista)	11
German Albums (Offizielle Top 100)	28
Hungarian Albums (MAHASZ)	1
Irish Albums (IRMA)	6
Italian Albums (FIMI)	2
Japanese Albums (Oricon)	15
New Zealand Albums (RMNZ)	4
Norwegian Albums (VG-lista)	3
Portuguese Albums (AFP)	3
Scottish Albums (OCC)	6
Spanish Albums (PROMUSICAE)	21
Swedish Albums (Sverigetopplistan)	4
Swiss Albums (Schweizer Hitparade)	15
UK Albums (OCC)	4
US Billboard 200	9
US Top Classical Albums (Billboard)	1

Chart (2019)	Peak position
Polish Albums (ZPAV)	1

=== Year-end charts ===
Chart (2007)	Position
Belgian Albums (Ultratop Wallonia)	80
Dutch Albums (Album Top 100)	21
New Zealand Albums (RMNZ)	22
Swedish Albums (Sverigetopplistan)	26
Swiss Albums (Schweizer Hitparade)	99
UK Albums (OCC)	19

Chart (2008)	Position
Canadian Albums (Billboard)	25
Dutch Albums (Album Top 100)	52
Swedish Albums (Sverigetopplistan)	97
UK Albums (OCC)	77
US Billboard 200	74

Chart (2009)	Position
US Top Classical Albums (Billboard)	9

Chart (2019)	Position
Polish Albums (ZPAV)	35

Chart (2022)	Position
Polish Albums (ZPAV)	70

== Certifications ==
Region	Certification	Certified units/sales
Austria (IFPI Austria)	Gold	10,000^{*}
Belgium (BRMA)	Gold	15,000^{*}
Brazil (Pro-Música Brasil)	Gold	30,000^{*}
Canada (Music Canada)	Platinum	100,000^{^}
Denmark (IFPI Danmark)	3× Platinum	60,000^{‡}
Germany (BVMI)	Gold	100,000^{‡}
Greece (IFPI Greece)	Gold	7,500^{^}
Hungary (MAHASZ)	2× Platinum	12,000^{^}
Ireland (IRMA)	2× Platinum	30,000^{^}
Italy (FIMI)	Platinum	50,000^{*}
Netherlands (NVPI)	Platinum	70,000^{^}
New Zealand (RMNZ)	Platinum	15,000^{^}
Norway (IFPI Norway)	2× Platinum	80,000^{*}
Poland (ZPAV)	2× Platinum	40,000^{*}
Portugal (AFP)	Gold	10,000^{^}
Russia (NFPF)	Gold	10,000^{*}
Switzerland (IFPI Switzerland)	Gold	15,000^{^}
United Kingdom (BPI)	3× Platinum	900,000^{*}
United States (RIAA) for The Best of Andrea Bocelli Vivere	Platinum	1,000,000^{^}
United States (RIAA) for Lo Mejor de Andrea Bocelli	Platinum (Latin)	100,000^{^}
Summaries
Europe (IFPI)	Platinum	1,000,000^{*}
^{*} Sales figures based on certification alone.^{^} Shipments figures based on certification alone.^{‡} Sales+streaming figures based on certification alone.

== See also ==
- Vivere Live in Tuscany the CD/DVD package of a pop concert for the album
