= Vivere Live in Tuscany =

Vivere live in tuscany

Live album (with DVD) by Andrea Bocelli
- Released: 29 January 2008
- Recorded: 5 July 2007
- Venue: Teatro del Silenzio, Lajatico, Tuscany, Italy
- Genre: Pop, classical
- Label: Sugar Records
- Producer: Humberto Gatica, Tony Renis

Andrea Bocelli DVD chronology
Under the Desert Sky (2006)	Vivere Live In Tuscany (2008)	Incanto The Documentary (2008)

Vivere Live in Tuscany is a live album and DVD of a pop concert by classical Italian tenor Andrea Bocelli. The concert was performed at Bocelli's Teatro del Silenzio in Lajatico, Tuscany, July 2007. In this DVD he performs duets with Sarah Brightman, Elisa, Laura Pausini and Heather Headley, and collaborates with Chris Botti, Lang Lang and Kenny G. It was certified Triple Diamond in Brazil, by the ABPD, with over 375,000 copies sold in the country.

== Track listing ==
=== CD ===
1. "Italia" featuring Chris Botti on trumpet
2. "La Voce del Silenzio", duet with Elisa
3. "Canto della Terra", duet with Sarah Brightman
4. "Mille Lune Mille Onde"
5. "Romanza"
6. "Se la Gente Usasse Il Cuore" (bonus studio recording)
7. "Domani" (bonus studio recording)

=== DVD ===
1. "Melodramma"
2. "Romanza"
3. "A Te" featuring Kenny G on soprano sax
4. "Vivo per Lei", duet with Heather Headley
5. "Io ci Sarò" featuring Lang Lang on piano
6. "Hungarian Rhapsody No. 2 in C♯ minor" performed by Lang Lang
7. "La Voce del Silenzio", duet with Elisa
8. "Dancing", performed by Elisa
9. "Canto della Terra", duet with Sarah Brightman
10. "Bellissime Stelle"
11. Medley: "Besame Mucho", "Somos Novios" (It's Impossible), "Can't Help Falling in Love"
12. "Because We Believe"
13. "The Prayer", duet with Heather Headley
14. "Italia" featuring Chris Botti on trumpet
15. "Dare to Live" (Vivere), duet with Laura Pausini
16. "Sogno"
17. "Il Mare Calmo della Sera"
18. "Time to Say Goodbye" (Con te Partirò), duet with Sarah Brightman

== Sales and certification ==
Region	Certification	Certified units/sales
Australia (ARIA) video	Gold	7,500^{^}
Brazil (Pro-Música Brasil) video	3× Diamond	375,000^{*}
United Kingdom (BPI) album	Silver	60,000^{^}
^{*} Sales figures based on certification alone.^{^} Shipments figures based on certification alone.
