= Lucio Quarantotto =

Italian songwriter

Lucio Quarantotto (29 April 1957 – 31 July 2012) was an Italian songwriter best known for writing the lyrics for "Con te partirò", to music composed by Francesco Sartori for Andrea Bocelli. The song was also recorded as a duet entitled "Time to Say Goodbye" by Bocelli and Sarah Brightman.

== Biography ==
Quarantotto also wrote the lyrics for "Canto della Terra" and "Immenso", with music again by Sartori. Both were recorded by Bocelli in his 1999 album Sogno and "Mille Lune Mille Onde", for his 2001 album Cieli di Toscana. "Canto della Terra" was also later recorded as a duet between Bocelli and Brightman in 2007.

Sartori and Quarantotto, working for Sugar Music, composed much of Bocelli's pop repertoire.

Quarantotto died by suicide on 31 July 2012 by jumping from a window of his sixth-floor apartment.
