= Stella Grigorian =

Georgian operatic mezzo-soprano (born 1968)

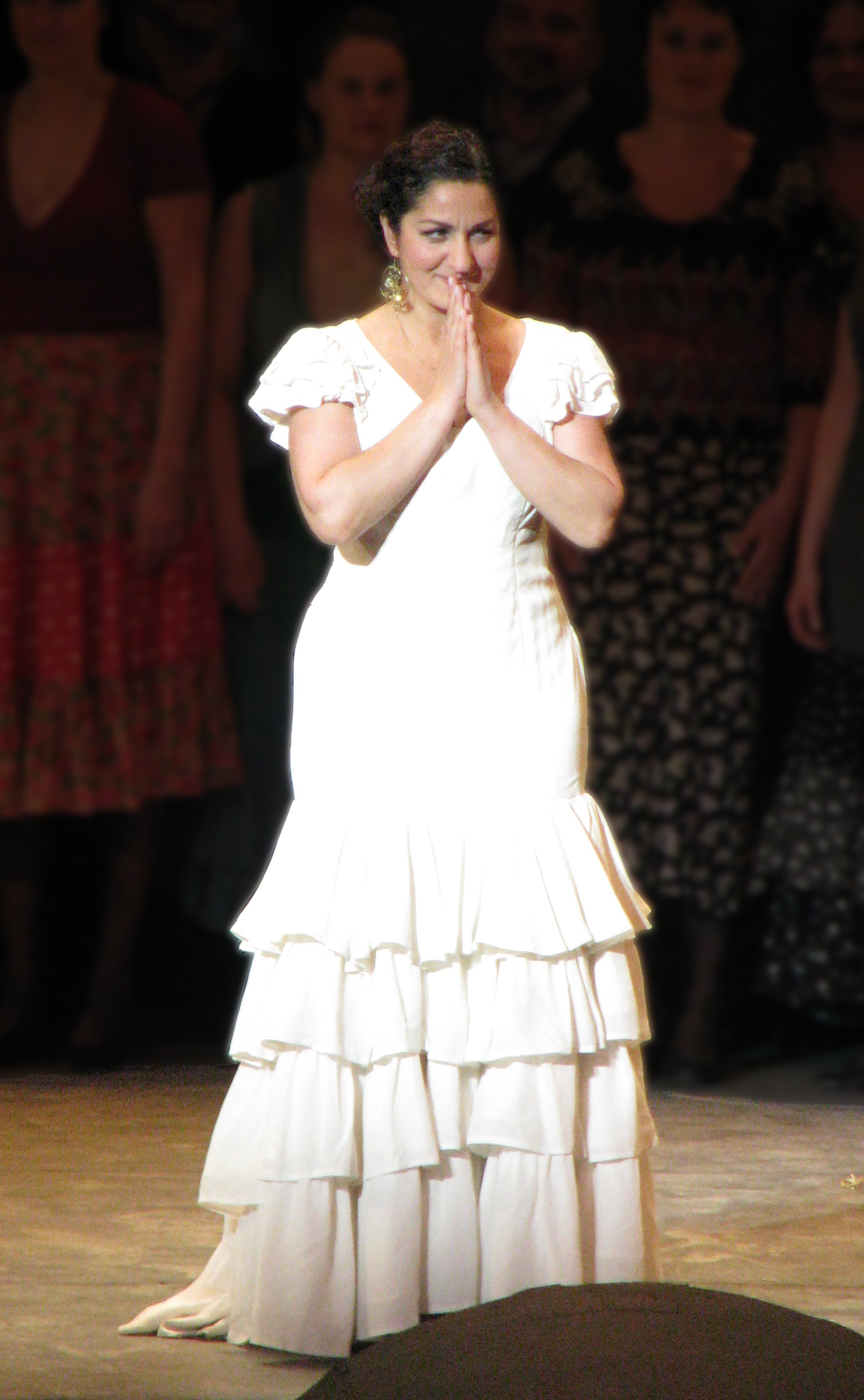
Stella Grigorian (2010)

Stella Grigorian (Georgian: სტელლა გრიგორიან; born 1968) is a Georgian operatic mezzo-soprano who trained at the music academy in Tbilisi. On completing her studies at the Vienna Conservatory, she made her début at the Vienna State Opera in 1998. She has performed in many leading roles, mainly in Austria and Germany but also in France, Switzerland and Denmark. In 2008, she released the album I'm suddenly Spanish!

== Biography ==
Born in 1968 in Tbilisi, Stella Grigorian she studied voice at the Tbilisi State Conservatoire and at the Vienna Conservatory. Engaged as a soloist by the Vienna State Opera, she made her début in 1998 and performed with the company until 2006. Her repertoire has included Rosina in The Barber of Seville, Zerlina in Don Giovanni, Despina in Così fan tutte, Bersi in Andrea Chénier, Meg in Falstaff, Pieretto in Linda di Chamounix and Stephano in Roméo et Juliette. One of her most popular roles has been the title role in Carmen which she has performed in Vienna, Hamburg, Savonlinna, Catania and Copenhagen.

Engaged by the Frankfurt Opera (2006–2010), her roles included Nerone in Agrippina, Polina in Pique Dame, Medea in Giasone, Cherubino in The Marriage of Figaro, Fenena in Nabucco and Giulietta in The Tales of Hoffmann. She has also performed a variety of operatic roles in Tel Aviv, Toulon, Zagreb, Florence, Tokyo and Istanbul.

More recently (January 2020), she has performed at the Bangkok Opera, taking two roles in Somtow Sucharitkul's Helena Citrónová.
