= Canto della Terra =

Single by Andrea Bocelli

from the album Sogno
- B-side: "Un Canto"
- Released: 1999
- Genre: Operatic pop, pop
- Length: 4:00
- Label: Decca, Sugar
- Songwriter(s): Francesco Sartori, Lucio Quarantotto
- Producer(s): Mauro Malavasi

Andrea Bocelli singles chronology
"The Prayer" (1999)	"Canto della Terra" (1999)	"Melodramma" (2001)

"Canto della Terra" is an Italian song which was the second single from Italian pop tenor Andrea Bocelli's 1999 album, Sogno. The song was written by composer Francesco Sartori and lyricist Lucio Quarantotto, the same writers of Bocelli's biggest hit "Con te partirò", and is among Bocelli's most popular and well-known songs.

Like "Con te partirò", the song was later recorded as a duet between Bocelli and Sarah Brightman, for her 2008 album Symphony. It was performed as a duet with Brightman at Andrea's "Live in Tuscany" Concert. The original version was also included in Bocelli's 2007 greatest hits album, The Best of Andrea Bocelli: Vivere.

In 2011, it was sung as a duet by Cheryl Baker of Bucks Fizz and The X Factor 2009 winner Joe McElderry on the second and final season of Popstar to Operastar. It was later recorded solo by McElderry for his second album Classic after winning the show.

== Charts ==
=== Weekly charts ===
Weekly chart performance for "Canto della Terra"
Chart (1999–2000)	Peak position
France (SNEP)	42
Netherlands (Single Top 100)	78
UK Singles (OCC)	24

=== Year-end charts ===
Year-end chart performance for "Canto della Terra"
Chart (1999)	Position
Europe Border Breakers (Eurochart Hot 100)	91
