= Francesco Sartori =

Italian composer and musician

Francesco Sartori (born 1957) is an Italian composer and piano and trumpet player.

== Works ==
Sartori composed "Con te partirò", with lyrics by Lucio Quarantotto, for Andrea Bocelli. The song was also recorded by Jonas Kaufmann with Orchestra Sinfonica Del Teatro Massimo Di Palermo directed by Asher Fisch (Sony Classical 018363288875) and as a duet entitled "Time to Say Goodbye" with Andrea Bocelli and Sarah Brightman.

Sartori and Quarantotto also composed "Canto della Terra" and "Immenso", both recorded by Bocelli for his 1999 album Sogno, and "Mille Lune Mille Onde" for his 2001 album Cieli di Toscana. "Canto della Terra" was also later recorded as a duet between Bocelli and Brightman in 2007.

Sartori and Quarantotto, working for Sugar Music, have composed much of Bocelli's pop repertoire.
