= Kristin Lewis =

American opera singer

Kristin Lewis (born 1975, Little Rock, Arkansas) is a lyrico-spinto soprano, known for her Verdi repertoire. She has performed in many opera houses around the world, and is based in Vienna, where she continued her studies with opera singer Carol Byers.

She debuted at the Metropolitan Opera on January 7, 2019, as Aida and gave a total of four performances. Zachary Woolfe of The New York Times reported: "The soprano Kristin Lewis lacked vocal fullness and color; her performance gave the impression of a faint pencil sketch of the part. (Sondra Radvanovsky was originally scheduled, but canceled on Christmas Eve.)"

== Awards ==
She has been awarded:

- the "Artist of the Year" award (Savonlinna Opera Festival, 2010)
- the "Oscars of the Opera" (Arena di Verona Foundation, 2010)
- the "Orazio Tosi Prize" (Club Lirica Parma, 2012)

She is also winner of the:

- Internationalen Gesangswettbewerb Ferruccio Tagliavini
- Concorso Internazionale Di Musica Gian Battista Viotti
- Concorso Internationale di Canto Debutto A Merano (Opera Prize and the Audience Award)

== Kristin Lewis Foundation ==
In 2014 she created the Kristin Lewis Foundation to support emerging musicians from her home state, Arkansas, with funds for tuition costs, attendance at master classes, and national or international travel.
