= Sogno =

Studio album by Andrea Bocelli
- Released: 6 April 1999
- Genres: Pop, operatic pop
- Length: 61:04
- Label: Philips

Andrea Bocelli chronology
Aria: The Opera Album (1998)	Sogno (1999)	Sacred Arias (1999)

Professional ratings
Review scores
Source	Rating
AllMusic	4/5 stars

Sogno (Dream) is the fifth studio album by Italian tenor Andrea Bocelli.

The album sold 2.5 million copies in the United States, and over 15 million copies worldwide. Bocelli was subsequently nominated for Best New Artist at the Grammys, the first and so far only time a classical artist had been nominated in the category since 1961.

== Release ==
Sogno was released internationally on April 6, 1999.

The album was released in Spanish under the name Sueño (Dream).

In Japan it was released as Yume no Kaori (夢の香り; The Smell of Dreams).

== Accolades ==
In 1999, Bocelli was nominated for Best New Artist at the Grammys, which marked the first time a classical artist had been nominated in the category in 38 years.

His duet with Celine Dion, "The Prayer," originally appeared as a solo version (for Celine Dion) in the 1998 animated film Quest for Camelot, and won the Golden Globe for Best Original Song as well as being nominated for an Academy Award for Best Original Song.

== Commercial performance ==
Sogno entered the upper reaches of the pop album charts around the world, giving birth to the phenomenon of "Bocellimania".

The album sold 2.5 million copies in the United States, and over 10 million copies worldwide.

== Track listing ==
Sogno
No.	Title	Writer(s)	Length
1.	"Canto della terra"	Francesco Sartori; Lucio Quarantotto	4:02
2.	"The Prayer" (feat. Céline Dion)	David Foster; Carole Bayer Sager	4:30
3.	"Sogno"	Giuseppe Francesco Servillo; Giuseppe Vessicchio	4:03
4.	"'O mare e tu" (feat. Dulce Pontes)	Enzo Gragnaniello	4:36
5.	"A volte il cuore"	Piero Marras	4:44
6.	"Cantico"	Mauro Malavasi; Pierpaolo Guerrini; Bocelli	4:01
7.	"Mai più così lontano"	Malavasi	4:20
8.	"Immenso"	Sartori; Quarantotto	4:51
9.	"Nel cuore lei" (feat. Eros Ramazzotti)	Bruno Zambrini; Dedo Cogliati	3:48
10.	"Tremo e t'amo"	Tullio Ferro; Servillo	4:51
11.	"I love Rossini"	Patrick Abrial; Servillo	3:56
12.	"Un canto"	Ennio Morricone; Sergio Bardotti	4:35
13.	"Come un fiume tu"	Morricone; Quarantotto	4:47
14.	"A mio padre (6 maggio 1992)"	Malavasi; Bocelli	4:00
Total length:			61:04

== Charts ==
=== Weekly charts ===
Chart (1999–2001)	Peak position
Australian Albums (ARIA)	3
Austrian Albums (Ö3 Austria)	3
Belgian Albums (Ultratop Flanders)	4
Belgian Albums (Ultratop Wallonia)	2
Canadian Albums (Billboard)	1
Dutch Albums (Album Top 100)	1
Finnish Albums (Suomen virallinen lista)	4
French Albums (SNEP)	2
German Albums (Offizielle Top 100)	6
Hungarian Albums (MAHASZ)	5
Irish Albums (IRMA)	61
New Zealand Albums (RMNZ)	3
Norwegian Albums (VG-lista)	2
Portuguese Albums (AFP)	1
Scottish Albums (Official Charts)	35
Swedish Albums (Sverigetopplistan)	1
Swiss Albums (Schweizer Hitparade)	1
UK Albums (Official Charts)	4
US Billboard 200	4

=== Year-end charts ===
Chart (1999)	Position
Australian Albums (ARIA)	27
Austrian Albums (Ö3 Austria)	26
Belgian Albums (Ultratop Flanders)	35
Belgian Albums (Ultratop Wallonia)	14
Dutch Albums (Album Top 100)	1
French Albums (SNEP)	42
German Albums (Offizielle Top 100)	65
Swiss Albums (Schweizer Hitparade)	21
UK Albums (OCC)	45
US Billboard 200	62

Chart (2000)	Position
Canadian Albums (Nielsen SoundScan)	166
Dutch Albums (Album Top 100)	22
South Korean International Albums (MIAK)	16
US Billboard 200	176

== Certifications and sales ==
Region	Certification	Certified units/sales
Argentina (CAPIF)	Gold	30,000^{^}
Argentina (CAPIF) Spanish version	Gold	30,000^{^}
Australia (ARIA)	2× Platinum	140,000^{^}
Austria (IFPI Austria)	Gold	25,000^{*}
Belgium (BRMA)	Gold	25,000^{*}
Brazil (Pro-Música Brasil)	Gold	100,000^{*}
Canada (Music Canada)	5× Platinum	500,000^{^}
France (SNEP)	2× Gold	200,000^{*}
Germany (BVMI)	Gold	250,000^{^}
Greece (IFPI Greece)	Gold	15,000^{^}
Italy	—	405,000
Mexico (AMPROFON) Spanish version	Gold	75,000^{^}
Netherlands (NVPI)	2× Platinum	200,000^{^}
New Zealand (RMNZ)	2× Platinum	30,000^{^}
Norway (IFPI Norway)	2× Platinum	100,000^{‡}
Poland (ZPAV)	Gold	50,000^{*}
Spain (Promusicae)	Gold	50,000^{^}
Sweden (GLF)	Gold	40,000^{^}
Switzerland (IFPI Switzerland)	2× Platinum	100,000^{^}
United Kingdom (BPI)	Platinum	300,000^{^}
United States (RIAA)	2× Platinum	2,000,000^{^}
Summaries
Europe (IFPI)	2× Platinum	2,000,000^{*}
Worldwide	—	10,000,000
^{*} Sales figures based on certification alone.^{^} Shipments figures based on certification alone.^{‡} Sales+streaming figures based on certification alone.
