= Incanto =

Studio album by Andrea Bocelli
- Released: 4 November 2008
- Recorded: Splash Studios, Naples
- Genre: Classical
- Labels: Decca Records, Universal
- Producer: Clive Bennett

Andrea Bocelli album chronology
The Best of Andrea Bocelli: Vivere (2007)	Incanto (2008)	My Christmas (2009)

Andrea Bocelli DVD chronology
Vivere Live in Tuscany (2007)	Incanto The Documentary (2008)	My Christmas Special (2009)

Incanto is the twelfth studio album by Classical Italian tenor Andrea Bocelli, released on 4 November 2008 and coinciding with his 50th birthday. The album, a personal tribute to the musical traditions of his homeland, features mainly Neapolitan love songs from Bocelli's childhood.

The two disc set also contains Incanto: The Documentary, a bonus DVD containing exclusive documentary footage, including an interview with Bocelli filmed in Naples, alongside a music video showcasing the Italian city in the 1950s. The video features rare clips of notable figures enjoying the romance of Naples in its heyday such as Elizabeth Taylor, Richard Burton, Sophia Loren, John F. Kennedy, among others.

On 21 February 2009, on the Italian talk-show, Che tempo che fa, Bocelli received a four times Diamond disc for Incanto, for selling in excess of 1.5 million copies within 4 months of its release. The album was also nominated for "album of the year" at the 2009 Classical BRIT Awards.

In Japan the album was released on 21 January 2009 as Santa Lucia: Miwaku no Italian Songs (サンタ・ルチア～魅惑のイタリアン・ソングス, Santa Ruchia: Meiwaku no Itarian Songusu; Santa Lucia: Fascinating Italian Songs) and featured two bonus tracks.

== Track listing ==
1. "Un Amore Cosi Grande" (feat. Veronica Berti) (Guido Maria Ferilli, Antonella Maggio) - 4:22
2. "'O Surdato 'Nnammurato" (Aniello Califano, Enrico Cannio) - 2:49
3. "Mamma" (Cesare Andrea Bixio, Bixio Cherubini) - 3:30
4. "Voglio Vivere Cosi" (Giovanni D’Anzi, Domenico Titomaglio) - 3:02
5. "Santa Lucia" (traditional, Teodoro Cottrau) - 4:27
6. "Funiculì, Funiculà" (Luigi Denza, Peppino Turco) - 2:31
7. "Because" (Guy d'Hardelot, Edward Frederick Lockton) - 2:36
8. "Vieni Sul Mar!" (Aniello Califano) - 4:37
9. "Granada" (Agustín Lara) - 4:12
10. "Era De Maggio" (feat. Anna Bonitatibus) (Mario Costa, Salvatore di Giacomo) - 4:57
11. "A Marechiare" (Francesco Paolo Tosti, Salvatore di Giacomo) - 3:14
12. "... E Vui Durmiti Ancora" (Gaetano E. Calì, Giovanni Formisano) - 5:03
13. "Non Ti Scordar di Me" (Ernesto De Curtis, Domenico Furno) - 3:59
14. "Pulcinella" (Antonello Cascone, arr., Sergio Cirillo) - 2:46

Japan bonus tracks

15. "Torna a Surriento" (Ernesto De Curtis)
16. "Tu che m'hai preso il cuor" from The Land of Smiles (Franz Lehár)

== Reviews ==
Blogcritics gave the album a favorable review.

== Charts ==
=== Weekly charts ===
Chart (2008)	Peak position
Australian Albums (ARIA)	33
Austrian Albums (Ö3 Austria)	40
Belgian Albums (Ultratop Flanders)	42
Belgian Albums (Ultratop Wallonia)	21
Canadian Albums (Billboard)	10
Danish Albums (Hitlisten)	20
Dutch Albums (Album Top 100)	15
Finnish Albums (Suomen virallinen lista)	20
French Albums (SNEP)	28
German Albums (Offizielle Top 100)	56
Hungarian Albums (MAHASZ)	2
Irish Albums (IRMA)	11
Italian Albums (FIMI)	5
New Zealand Albums (RMNZ)	21
Norwegian Albums (VG-lista)	15
Portuguese Albums (AFP)	15
Scottish Albums (Official Charts)	15
Spanish Albums (Promusicae)	68
Swiss Albums (Schweizer Hitparade)	40
UK Albums (Official Charts)	12
US Billboard 200	8
US Top Classical Albums (Billboard)	1

=== Year-end charts ===
Chart (2008)	Position
UK Albums (OCC)	163
Chart (2009)	Position
US Billboard 200	112
US Top Classical Albums (Billboard)	2
Chart (2010)	Position
US Top Classical Albums (Billboard)	12

== Certifications and sales ==
Region	Certification	Certified units/sales
Australia (ARIA)	Gold	35,000^{^}
Brazil (Pro-Música Brasil)	Platinum	60,000^{*}
Finland (Musiikkituottajat)	Gold	14,349
Greece (IFPI Greece)	Gold	7,500^{^}
Hungary (MAHASZ)	Platinum	6,000^{^}
Ireland (IRMA)	Platinum	15,000^{^}
Italy	—	100,000
Norway (IFPI Norway)	Gold	15,000^{*}
Poland (ZPAV)	Platinum	20,000^{*}
Taiwan	—	10,000
United Kingdom (BPI)	Gold	100,000^{^}
United States	—	500,000
^{*} Sales figures based on certification alone.^{^} Shipments figures based on certification alone.
