= Somos Novios (It's Impossible) =

1968 song by Armando Manzanero

Single by Armando Manzanero

from the album Somos Novios
- Released: 1968
- Genre: Bolero
- Label: RCA Victor
- Songwriter: Armando Manzanero

Armando Manzanero singles chronology
"Perdóname"	"Somos Novios"	"Aquel Señor"

Audio video
- "Somos Novios" on YouTube

"Somos Novios" (Spanish for "We're a couple") is a song first recorded by Mexican songwriter Armando Manzanero in 1968. Perry Como recorded an English version of "Somos Novios" with original English lyrics titled "It's Impossible", which was a top 10 hit in the US and the UK.

The song has become one of the most popular boleros of all time and it has been covered by numerous artists. The recording by Manzanero was inducted into the Latin Grammy Hall of Fame in 2001.

== Background ==
The song was the title track of Manzanero third album Somos Novios released in July 1968. Manzanero also appeared in the 1969 Mexican film of the same title Somos Novios starring Palito Ortega, and performed the song. The song was included in the inaugural inductions for the Latin Grammy Hall of Fame established in 2001 to honor early Latin music recordings.

== Perry Como version ==
"It's Impossible"

Single by Perry Como

from the album It's Impossible
- B-side: "Long Life, Lots of Happiness"
- Released: September 1970
- Recorded: 1970
- Genre: Traditional pop; vocal; jazz
- Label: RCA Victor
- Songwriters: Armando Manzanero; Sid Wayne
- Producer: Ernie Altschuler

Perry Como singles chronology
"Seattle" (1969)	"It's Impossible" (1970)	"I Think of You" (1971)

Audio video
- "It's Impossible" on YouTube

"Somos Novios" was adapted in 1970 by Sid Wayne, who wrote original English lyrics set to the music. Sid Wayne was a collaborator with Elvis Presley, but decided to give the song instead to Perry Como. Perry Como recorded the song under the title "It's Impossible".

The Como version would be one of his most influential records, and in February 1971 it became his first song to reach the top ten of the Billboard Hot 100 in more than 12 years, peaking at No. 10. The song's peak on the Hot 100 chart came just weeks after concluding a four-week run at number one on the Billboard Easy Listening chart. On the UK Singles Chart, the single reached No. 4 in 1971.

Como's version was nominated for Song of the Year at the 1971 Grammy but lost to "You've Got a Friend".

=== Charts ===
==== Weekly charts ====
Chart (1970–1971)	Peak position
Australia (Kent Music Report)	85
Belgium (Ultratop 50 Flanders)	29
Belgium (Ultratop 50 Wallonia)	30
Canada RPM Adult Contemporary	4
Canada RPM Top Singles	37
Ireland (IRMA)	6
Netherlands (Single Top 100)	18
UK Singles (Official Charts)	4
US Billboard Hot 100	10
US Cash Box Top 100	10
US Adult Contemporary (Billboard)	1

==== Year-end charts ====
Chart (1970–71)	
UK	19

== Andrea Bocelli versions ==
"Somos Novios (It's Impossible)"

Single by Andrea Bocelli featuring Christina Aguilera

from the album Amore
- Released: March 2006 (US)
- Recorded: 2006
- Genre: Pop; classical; R&B
- Length: 4:22
- Label: Sugar; Opera & Blues; Decca
- Songwriter: Armando Manzanero
- Producers: David Foster; Humberto Gatica

Andrea Bocelli singles chronology
"Un Nuovo Giorno" (2004)	"Somos Novios (It's Impossible)" (2006)	"Because We Believe" (2006)

Christina Aguilera singles chronology
"Tilt Ya Head Back" (2004)	"Somos Novios (It's Impossible)" (2006)	"Ain't No Other Man" (2006)

Audio video
- "Somos Novios" on YouTube

Italian tenor Andrea Bocelli recorded the song with American singer Christina Aguilera in 2006. The duet was released as a single in from Bocelli's eleventh studio album, Amore (2006). Aguilera and Bocelli performed the song together at the Sanremo Music Festival on March 3, 2006. Jonathan Widran of AllMusic considered the song "enchanting" and noted that Aguilera's vocals were "delightfully torchy". This version was ranked at number ten on the list of Aguilera's best songs by AXS. On the Italian Singles Chart, "Somos Novios (It's Impossible)" reached number thirty-nine in April 2006.

Another version of the duet with Japanese singer Rimi Natsukawa was released as a bonus track in the album's Japanese edition, as well as a bonus track for the Japanese edition of Bocelli's first greatest hits album The Best of Andrea Bocelli: Vivere (2007). Bocelli has also covered the song as a duet with a number of other artists, including Petra Berger and Katharine McPhee.

McPhee joined Bocelli onstage at the JCPenney Jam and their version is included on the album for the event.

== See also ==
- List of number-one adult contemporary singles of 1970 (U.S.)
