= Melodramma (song) =

Single by Andrea Bocelli

from the album Cieli di Toscana, The Best of Andrea Bocelli: Vivere
- Released: 2001
- Genre: Operatic pop, pop
- Length: 4:07
- Label: Decca, Sugar
- Songwriters: Pierpaolo Guerrini, Paolo Luciani

Andrea Bocelli singles chronology
| "Canto della Terra" (1999) | "Melodramma" (2001) | ""Mille Lune; Mille Onde"" (2001) |

"Melodramma" is the lead single from Italian pop tenor Andrea Bocelli's 2001 album, Cieli di Toscana. The song was written by Pierpaolo Guerrini and Paolo Luciani, and is among Bocelli's most popular and well-known songs.

The song was later included in Bocelli's 2007 greatest hits album, The Best of Andrea Bocelli: Vivere.

The music video of the song is directed by Larry Weinstein and features Bocelli singing while riding a horse.

== Chart performance ==
Peak chart positions
| ITA | BEL | NL | SWI | GER |
|---|---|---|---|---|
| – | 9 | 52 | 77 | 95 |
