= Cieli di Toscana =

Studio album by Andrea Bocelli
- Released: 2001; 16 October 2001 (United States)
- Recorded: 2001
- Genres: Pop, classical
- Labels: Decca, Sugar Records

Andrea Bocelli chronology
Verdi (2000)	Cieli di Toscana (2001)	Sentimento (2002)

Cieli di Toscana (Tuscan Skies) is Italian tenor Andrea Bocelli's eighth studio album, released in 2001.

Released in October 2001, the album spent a total of two weeks at No. 3 on the official UK albums chart, the highest chart position ever for a foreign-language pop album, and reached the top 5 in over 10 other countries.

Tuscan Skies, a DVD of music videos of most of the songs of the album, was released the following year.

== Track listing ==
1. "Melodramma" (4:09) (Pierpaolo Guerrini, Paolo Luciani)
2. "Mille Lune Mille Onde" (4:01) (David Foster, Lucio Quarantotto, Francesco Sartori, Claudio Corradini)
3. "E Sara' A Settembre (Someone Like You)" (5:06) (Alberto Salerno, Barry Blue, Robin Smith)
4. "Chiara" (4:04) (David Foster, Francesco Sartori, Alessio Bonomo)
5. "Mascagni" (4:12) (Pietro Mascagni, Paolo Marioni, Luigino Biagioni, Carlo Botteghi)
6. "Resta Qui" (4:10) (Andrea Bocelli, Matteo Musumeci)
7. "Il Mistero Dell'Amore" (4:30) (Laurex, Raffaello Di Pietro)
8. "Se La Gente Usasse Il Cuore" (5:00) (Tony Renis, Alberto Testa, Massimo Guantini)
9. "Si Voltò" (4:07) (Alessio Bonomo, Fausto Mesolella)
10. "L'Abitudine" (4:21) (Feat. Helena Hellwig) (Giorgio Calabrese, Pierpaolo Guerrini)
11. "L'Incontro" (4:52) (Feat. Bono) (Francesco Sartori, Andrea Bocelli, Alessio Bonomo)
12. "E Mi Manchi Tu" (5:03) (Giorgio Calabrese, Zdenek Bartak)
13. "Il Diavolo E L'Angelo" (4:03) (Andrea Bocelli)
14. "L'Ultimo Re" (3:48) (Alessandro Napoletano, Marco di Marco)
15. "Tornera la Neve" (4:05) (Bonus track)hitparade.ch

== Reception ==
=== Commercial performance ===
Cieli di Toscana sold millions of copies in a few weeks after its release, and quickly become the biggest selling album in the world in 2001, No. 1 on the CNN Worldbeat Global Album Chart.

In the United States, the album peaked at No. 11 on the Billboard 200 chart, with 85,000 units sold in its first week, and blew through 177,000 copies over Christmas week of 2001, Bocelli's best sales week in America, at the time. That record stood for the following 8 years, until My Christmas, Bocelli's first Holiday album, was released in late 2009 and achieved better sales weeks. The album performed better on six consecutive weeks during the Holiday season, with 185,000, 218,000, 428,000, 400,000, 390,000, and 284,000 copies sold on each, in the United States.

The album topped the charts in Sweden and the Netherlands, and reached the top 3 in at least 8 other countries, including the UK, where it spent two weeks at No. 3 on the albums chart, Bocelli's highest chart position in the country to date, and the highest chart position ever for a foreign-language pop album.

== Charts ==
=== Weekly charts ===
Weekly chart performance for Cieli di Toscana
Chart (2001)	Peak position
Australian Albums (ARIA)	6
Austrian Albums (Ö3 Austria)	4
Belgian Albums (Ultratop Flanders)	12
Belgian Albums (Ultratop Wallonia)	11
Canadian Albums (Billboard)	10
Danish Albums (Hitlisten)	16
Dutch Albums (Album Top 100)	1
Finnish Albums (Suomen virallinen lista)	9
French Albums (SNEP)	18
German Albums (Offizielle Top 100)	3
Hungarian Albums (MAHASZ)	4
Irish Albums (IRMA)	3
Italian Albums (FIMI)	4
New Zealand Albums (RMNZ)	2
Norwegian Albums (VG-lista)	2
Scottish Albums (Official Charts)	3
Swedish Albums (Sverigetopplistan)	1
Swiss Albums (Schweizer Hitparade)	8
UK Albums (Official Charts)	3
US Billboard 200	11
US Top Classical Albums (Billboard)	1

=== Year-end charts ===
Year-end chart performance for Cieli di Toscana
Chart (2001)	Position
Australian Albums (ARIA)	39
Austrian Albums (Ö3 Austria)	44
Canadian Albums (Nielsen SoundScan)	43
Dutch Albums (Album Top 100)	6
German Albums (Offizielle Top 100)	65
Swedish Albums (Sverigetopplistan)	4
Swiss Albums (Schweizer Hitparade)	58
UK Albums (OCC)	50
Worldwide Albums (IFPI)	24

Chart (2002)	Position
Austrian Albums (Ö3 Austria)	59
Canadian Albums (Nielsen SoundScan)	165
Dutch Albums (Album Top 100)	33
UK Albums (OCC)	170

== Certifications and sales ==
Certifications and sales for Cieli di Toscana
Region	Certification	Certified units/sales
Australia (ARIA)	Platinum	70,000^{^}
Austria (IFPI Austria)	Gold	20,000^{*}
Belgium (BRMA)	Gold	25,000^{*}
Brazil (Pro-Música Brasil)	Gold	50,000^{*}
Canada (Music Canada)	2× Platinum	200,000^{^}
Denmark (IFPI Danmark)	Gold	25,000^{^}
Finland (Musiikkituottajat)	Gold	19,198
France (SNEP)	Gold	100,000^{*}
Germany (BVMI)	Gold	150,000^{‡}
Greece (IFPI Greece)	Gold	15,000^{^}
Netherlands (NVPI)	2× Platinum	160,000^{^}
New Zealand (RMNZ)	2× Platinum	30,000^{^}
Norway (IFPI Norway)	2× Platinum	100,000^{*}
Spain (Promusicae)	Gold	50,000^{^}
Sweden (GLF)	Platinum	80,000^{^}
Switzerland (IFPI Switzerland)	Platinum	40,000^{^}
United Kingdom (BPI)	Platinum	300,000^{^}
United States (RIAA)	Platinum	1,000,000^{^}
Summaries
Europe (IFPI)	Platinum	1,000,000^{*}
Worldwide	—	4,000,000
^{*} Sales figures based on certification alone.^{^} Shipments figures based on certification alone.^{‡} Sales+streaming figures based on certification alone.

== Music videos ==
Music videos of 10 songs of the album were filmed in Tuscany, in 2001. Tuscan Skies (Cieli di Toscana) a DVD containing those videos was released January 15, 2002.

== See also ==
- Tuscan Skies (Cieli di Toscana)
