= Con te partirò =

1995 song by Andrea Bocelli

- One of artworks for European release, also used for Japanese mini CD release under different pressing

Single by Andrea Bocelli

from the album Bocelli
- B-side: "Vivere"
- Released: 21 February 1995
- Genre: Operatic pop
- Length: 4:09
- Label: Polydor
- Composer: Francesco Sartori
- Lyricist: Lucio Quarantotto

Andrea Bocelli singles chronology
"Il mare calmo della sera" (1995)	"Con te partirò" (1995)	"Macchine da guerra" (1995)

Music video
- "Con te partirò" by Andrea Bocelli on YouTube

"Con te partirò" (Italian: [kon ˈte ppartiˈrɔ]; "With You I Shall Depart") is an Italian song written by Francesco Sartori (music) and Lucio Quarantotto (lyrics). It was first performed by Italian tenor Andrea Bocelli at the 1995 Sanremo Music Festival and recorded on his album of the same year, Bocelli. The single was first released as an A-side single with "Vivere" in 1995, topping the charts, first in France, where it became one of the best-selling singles of all-time, and then in Belgium, breaking the all-time record sales there.

A second version of the song, sung partly in English, released in 1996 as "Time to Say Goodbye", paired Bocelli with British soprano Sarah Brightman, and achieved even greater success, topping charts all across Europe, including Germany, where it became the biggest-selling single in history. Brightman and Bocelli produced a version with Brightman singing in German and Bocelli in Italian, with this version being available on the CD Time to Say Goodbye. That version alone has now sold more than 12 million copies worldwide, making it one of the best-selling singles of all time. The song is also known in its Spanish-language version "Por ti volaré" ("For You I Shall Fly").

== Background ==
The song's original single release by Polydor Records was not commercially successful in Italy, and received minor radio airplay there. Elsewhere it was a big hit; in France and Switzerland, the single topped the charts for six weeks, earning a triple Gold sales award. In Belgium, it became the biggest hit of all time, spending 12 weeks at No. 1.

== Critical reception ==
Pan-European magazine Music & Media wrote about the song, "The Benelux triumph of poppy tenor Andrea Bocelli continues with this excellent seasonal anthem, which wisely leaves the singer’s classically trained voice in the spotlight. The orchestral arrangements take a back seat, as they should in Bocelli's case." After Sarah Brightman released her version, Larry Flick from Billboard stated that she "has one of the truly glorious voices in musical theater". He described the song as a "lushly orchestral piece". British magazine Music Week gave the duet version a top score of five out of five and named it Single of the Week, writing, "Mostly sung in Italian, it has a beautiful, soaring melody that gives it true 'Nessun Dorma' potential."

== Charts ==
=== Weekly charts ===
Weekly chart performance for "Con te partirò"
Chart (1996–1997)	Peak position
Belgium (Ultratop 50 Flanders)	1
Belgium (Ultratop 50 Wallonia)	1
Europe (Eurochart Hot 100)	10
France (SNEP)	1
Netherlands (Dutch Top 40)	20
Netherlands (Single Top 100)	18

2007 chart performance for "Con te partirò"
Chart (2007)	Peak position
UK Singles (Official Charts)	69

=== Year-end charts ===
1996 year-end chart performance for "Con te partirò"
Chart (1996)	Position
Belgium (Ultratop 50 Flanders)	1
Belgium (Ultratop 50 Wallonia)	2

1997 year-end chart performance for "Con te partirò"
Chart (1997)	Position
Europe (Eurochart Hot 100)	30
France (SNEP)	4

=== Decade-end charts ===
1990s-end chart performance for "Con te partirò"
Chart (1990s)	Position
Belgium (Ultratop Flanders)	16

== Certifications ==
Certifications and sales for "Con te partirò"
Region	Certification	Certified units/sales
Belgium (BRMA)	Platinum	50,000^{*}
France	—	900,000
Italy (FIMI)	Gold	25,000^{‡}
United Kingdom (BPI)	Silver	200,000^{‡}
^{*} Sales figures based on certification alone.^{‡} Sales+streaming figures based on certification alone.

== Duet version ==
"Time to Say Goodbye"
- Artwork for European release

Single by Sarah Brightman and Andrea Bocelli

from the album Romanza, The Best of Andrea Bocelli: Vivere, Fly and Time to Say Goodbye / Timeless
- Released: 15 November 1996
- Studio: Nemo Studio (Hamburg, Germany)
- Genre: Operatic pop
- Label: East West
- Composer: Francesco Sartori
- Lyricist: Lucio Quarantotto
- Producer: Frank Peterson

Andrea Bocelli singles chronology
"Vivo por ella" (1996)	"Time to Say Goodbye" (1996)	"Ich lebe für sie" (1997)

Live video
- "Time to Say Goodbye" (live, 2007) by Andrea Bocelli and Sarah Brightman on YouTube

Sarah Brightman singles chronology
"Heaven Is Here" (1995)	"Time to Say Goodbye" (1996)	"Just Show Me How to Love You" (1997)

In Germany, East West Records, in conjunction with Polydor, marketed a lyrically changed version of "Con te partirò", retitled "Time to Say Goodbye", as the theme song for the final match of boxer Henry Maske (then the light-heavyweight champion of the International Boxing Federation), having seen previous success when Vangelis's "Conquest of Paradise" was also promoted via Maske's fights. "Time to Say Goodbye" was also turned into a duet with Sarah Brightman, who had performed "A Question of Honour" for one of Maske's previous fights. German producer Frank Peterson, who has worked with Brightman since 1991, opted to give the song an English title rather than the German title "Mit dir werde ich fortgehen". Recording of the song took place at Peterson's Nemo Studio, in Hamburg.

The match took place on 23 November 1996, pitting Maske against American Virgil Hill, and drew a television broadcast audience of over 21 million. Bocelli and Brightman performed the song to open the match, and it was used again during Maske's exit, poignantly, as Hill had won the match by split decision. It was the only loss of Maske's career.

By December, the "Time to Say Goodbye" single, released on 15 November 1996 through East West, had reached number one on the German singles chart, with sales estimated at 40,000–60,000 per day and projected for at least one million by the end of the year. Both singers' albums also received a boost in sales. Airplay on German radio stations such as Norddeutscher Rundfunk was well received by listeners. By February of the following year, the single had broken the all-time sales record in Germany with 1.65 million sales, and would eventually get certified 11× Gold for selling over 2,750,000 copies.

"Time to Say Goodbye" reached number two on the UK Singles Chart upon its release there in May 1997, and was certified gold. It remained in the top 30 for another two months, helped by steady radio airplay on BBC Radio 2, which was overtaking Radio 1 in popularity with an MOR-orientated playlist.

The duet was included on Brightman's 1997 album Timeless, re-titled as Time to Say Goodbye in the US with the song itself moved to the start of the album. Brightman has also recorded a solo version, which was released on the duet single as well as later albums including Classics and Diva: The Singles Collection. A live version was released on The Harem World Tour: Live from Las Vegas CD as well as her various tour DVDs. Bocelli and Brightman have performed the duet together publicly several times including Bocelli's "Statue of Liberty concert" held in New York City, and "Live in Tuscany" concerts. Brightman's solo version serves as the main theme for the 2009 Japanese film Amalfi: Rewards of the Goddess, where she also made a cameo appearance.

This version is the most popular song played at the Bellagio's fountain show.

On 26 December 2024, Netflix released the second season of Squid Game, which features the song in the first episode, as Gong Yoo's character "The Recruiter" plays the song during his Russian roulette game against Lee Jung-jae's character, Seong Gi-hun.

=== Charts ===
==== Weekly charts ====
Weekly chart performance for Sarah Brightman & Andrea Bocelli's version
Chart (1996–1997)	Peak position
Austria (Ö3 Austria Top 40)	1
Belgium (Ultratip Bubbling Under Flanders)	6
Canada Adult Contemporary (RPM)	33
Czech Republic (IFPI CR)	9
Europe (Eurochart Hot 100)	1
France (SNEP)	25
Germany (GfK)	1
Ireland (IRMA)	1
Israel (Israeli Singles Chart)	1
Netherlands (Dutch Top 40)	8
Netherlands (Single Top 100)	5
Quebec (ADISQ)	4
Scottish Singles Sales (Official Charts)	2
Sweden (Sverigetopplistan)	31
Switzerland (Schweizer Hitparade)	1
UK Singles (Official Charts)	2

==== Year-end charts ====
1997 year-end chart performance for Sarah Brightman & Andrea Bocelli's version
Chart (1997)	Position
Austria (Ö3 Austria Top 40)	3
Brazil Airplay (Crowley)	53
Europe (Eurochart Hot 100)	7
Germany (Media Control)	1
Israel (Israeli Singles Chart)	7
Netherlands (Dutch Top 40)	7
Netherlands (Single Top 100)	40
Romania (Romanian Top 100)	100
Switzerland (Schweizer Hitparade)	1
UK Singles (OCC)	23

==== Decade-end charts ====
Chart (1990–1999)	Rank
Austria (Ö3 Austria Top 40)	2
Netherlands (Dutch Top 40)	64

=== Certifications and sales ===
Certifications and sales for Sarah Brightman & Andrea Bocelli's version
Region	Certification	Certified units/sales
Austria (IFPI Austria)	Platinum	50,000^{*}
Brazil	—	50,000
Germany (BVMI)	11× Gold	3,000,000
Japan (RIAJ) Sarah Brightman solo version	Gold	100,000^{*}
Switzerland (IFPI Switzerland)	2× Platinum	100,000^{^}
United Kingdom (BPI)	Platinum	600,000^{^}
^{*} Sales figures based on certification alone.^{^} Shipments figures based on certification alone.

=== Release history ===
Release dates for "Con te partirò"
Region	Date	Format(s)	Label(s)	Ref.
Germany	15 November 1996	CD	East West	
United Kingdom	12 May 1997	CD; cassette	Coalition; East West	

== Donna Summer version ==
"I Will Go with You (Con te partirò)"

Single by Donna Summer

from the album Live & More Encore
- Released: 1999
- Genre: House
- Length: 3:58
- Label: Epic
- Composer: Francesco Sartori
- Lyricist: Lucio Quarantotto
- Producer: Hex Hector

Donna Summer singles chronology
"Whenever There Is Love" (1996)	"I Will Go with You (Con te partirò)" (1999)	"Love Is the Healer" (1999)

Music video
- "I Will Go with You (Con te partirò)" by Donna Summer on YouTube

"I Will Go with You (Con te partirò)" is a dance version performed by American singer-songwriter Donna Summer. Summer herself translated the lyrics into English, and her version was produced by Hex Hector. It was released as a single by Epic Records, which went to number one on the US Billboard dance chart. It also peaked at number two on the Spanish singles charts and number three on the Spanish Radio chart. As of 1999, it had sold over 221,000 units in the United States.

=== Critical reception ===
Chuck Taylor from Billboard magazine complimented the song as a "deliciously grand interpretation of the smash Andrea Bocelli/Sarah Brightman ballad 'Time to Say Goodbye'-replete with romantic new lyrics. Summer is in peak vocal form, alternating between technically sharp note-scaling and warmly soulful vamping." He also noted that she is "complemented by clubland hero Hex Hector's well-measured production, which couples melodramatic faux-classical string flourishes with time-sensitive dance beats."

=== Charts ===
Chart performance for "I Will Go with You (Con te partirò)" by Donna Summer
Chart (1999)	Peak position
Australia (ARIA)	97
Belgium (Ultratip Bubbling Under Flanders)	6
Netherlands (Single Top 100)	59
Spain (Promusicae)	2
UK Singles (Official Charts)	44
US Billboard Hot 100	79
US Dance Club Songs (Billboard)	1

== Other cover versions ==
Since its release, the song has spawned numerous other versions and been performed by numerous other singers. Notable alternative versions include "Por ti volaré", a Spanish version with significantly modified lyrics.

- Paloma San Basilio recorded a version sung in Spanish on the album Clásicamente Tuya in 1997.
- Nana Mouskouri recorded a version on the 1997 album, Hommages.
- Al Bano recorded a version on the 1998 album, Il nuovo concerto and on the 2013 compilation Canta Sanremo.
- A Taiwanese singer A-Mei (Zhang Hui Mei) recorded the song in Chinese, in 2000, on the album Ge Sheng Mei Ying with Hong Kong Philharmonic Orchestra.
- In 2001, Journey guitarist Neal Schon released a solo album, Voice, which features an instrumental version of the song.
- In 2004, trumpeter Chris Botti released his rendition on When I Fall in Love.
- Welsh mezzo-soprano Katherine Jenkins included the song on her 2004 album, Second Nature. Jenkins' version was also released as a single on 21 February 2005.
- The song was covered by Italian house DJ Gigi D'Agostino in his 2006 compilation album, Some Experiments.
- American singer Nick Palance recorded this song on his solo CD, Memoirs in Song, in 2006.
- Grégory Lemarchal (1983-2007) recorded a version for his album La voix d'un ange (The Voice of an Angel). Lemarchal suffered from cystic fibrosis that affected his lungs and the recording of the track proved difficult. The album was posthumously released on 18 June 2007 shortly after Lemarchal died on 30 April 2007 aged 23, while waiting for a lung transplant.
- New Zealand singer Hayley Westenra included a version on her 2007 album, Amazing Grace – The Best of Hayley Westenra.
- Swedish singer Sanna Nielsen's English-Swedish version was included in her 2007 album, Sanna 11–22.
- André Rieu with Mirusia Louwerse also recorded a version of this song on the album, You'll Never Walk Alone. Mirusia and André Rieu also performed the song at the coronation of the king of Netherlands, Koning Willem Alexander, which was recorded for the DVD and CD Rieu Royale.
- South African tenor Fanie de Jager recorded the song on his classical CD, My Classical Soul, in 2007.
- The pipes and drums of the Royal Scots Dragoon Guards covered the song for their 2007 album, Spirit of the Glen.
- Japanese classical-crossover singer Kanon recorded a version of the song and included it on her 2007 album, Precious.
- The 2008 film Step Brothers has the song in its climax with Will Ferrell singing "Por ti Volaré", a Spanish-translated version of the song, along with an incorporating drum solo by John C. Reilly; Ferrell actually sang the part for the film.
- In 2009, Mark Vincent recorded the version for his debut studio album, My Dream – Mio Visione.
- French classical-crossover tenor Amaury Vassili also did the same on his 2010 album, Canterò.
- British singer Joe McElderry recorded the song on his 2011 album, Classic, and made a video of it.
- Operatic pop group Il Divo covered the song on their 2011 album, Wicked Game.
- The song was covered by Vampire Weekend for Starbucks' Sweetheart 2014 compilation.
- The song was also covered by Lauren Aquilina in 2015, which was used to advert the season six of Downton Abbey.
- In 2016, Marina Prior and Mark Vincent covered the song on their album Together.
- In May 2016, Bocelli performed the song at the King Power Stadium in honour of Leicester City Football Club's 2015–16 Premier League title win and in honour of Bocelli's friend, then-Leicester City manager and fellow Italian Claudio Ranieri.
- Celtic Woman covered the song, in English, on their 2016 album, Celtic Woman: Voices of Angels.
- Internet personality Ludwig Ahgren covered the song, mainly as a ruse to make it seem like an Artificial Intelligence version using his voice, in 2023. A fully produced music video has been uploaded to one of his YouTube channels.

=== Samples and interpolations ===
The song has been sampled or interpolated in the following:

- In 2008, Danish pop duo the Loft released their single "Kiss You Goodbye" based on "Con te partirò" / "Time to Say Goodbye" and containing samples from the original.
- In 2009, Twenty One Pilots sampled and featured the song throughout their similarly named "Time to Say Goodbye", with Tyler Joseph primarily rapping his verses over its reimagined track.
- Jason Derulo and David Guetta interpolated "Time to Say Goodbye" on their 2018 single "Goodbye" featuring Nicki Minaj and Willy William. The song is included on David Guetta's seventh studio album, 7.
- In May 2019, Jay-Z and Kanye West's unreleased song "Living So Italian", which samples "Con te partirò", surfaced online. It was recorded for their collaborative album Watch the Throne (2011), but was excluded from the final track list as Jay-Z and West were unable to clear the sample.

== See also ==
- List of number-one dance singles of 1999 (U.S.)
