= Valdera =

Valdera is the name of an area in the Province of Pisa in Tuscany, Italy.

It comprises the following municipalities:

- Capannoli
- Casciana Terme Lari
- Chianni
- Crespina
- Lajatico
- Palaia
- Peccioli
- Ponsacco
- Terricciola

The Valdera area usually also includes the following municipalities for social and economical reasons. They are all located near the lower part of the Arno river valley and near the Lucca plain.

- Pontedera
- Bientina
- Buti
- Calcinaia
- Santa Maria a Monte
