= Piero Capponi =

Florentine statesman and military leader

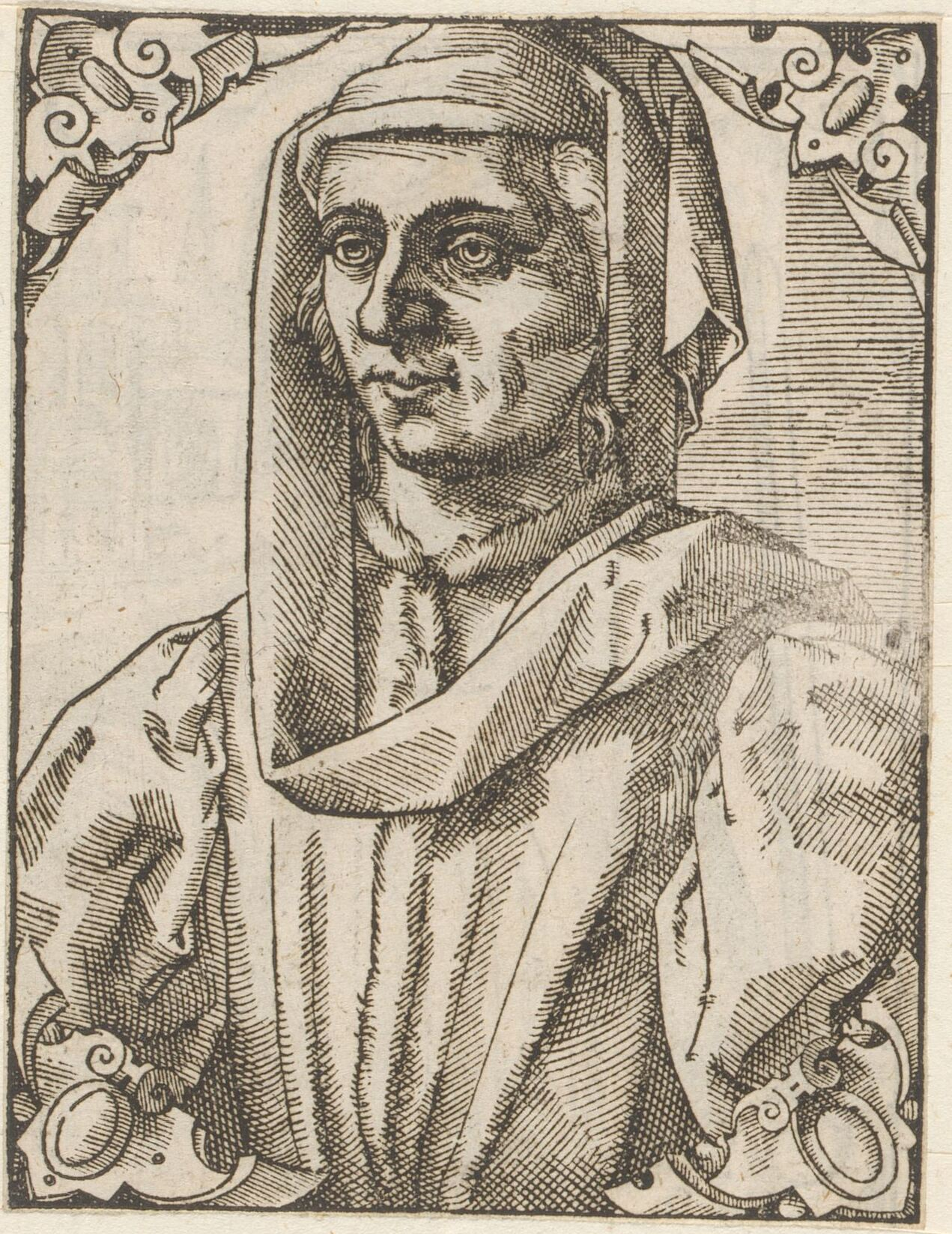
- Engraved portrait of Piero Capponi by Tobias Stimmer
- Born: 1447; Florence, Republic of Florence
- Died: 25 September 1496 (aged 48–49); Soiana, Republic of Florence
- Occupations: Statesman and military leader

Piero Capponi (1447 – September 25, 1496) was an Italian statesman and military leader from Florence; he is celebrated for his bold defiance of the King of France in 1494.

== Biography ==
First intended for a business career, Piero's diplomatic abilities were recognized by Lorenzo de' Medici, who sent him as ambassador to various courts, where he acquitted himself with distinction. In 1492 upon the death of Lorenzo, the feckless leadership of Piero de' Medici led Capponi to become one of the leaders of the anti-Medicean faction which two years later succeeded in expelling this Medici ruler from Florence. Capponi was then made chief of the republic and conducted public affairs with great skill, notably in the difficult negotiations with Charles VIII of France, who had invaded Italy in 1494 and in whose camp the exiled Medici had taken refuge.

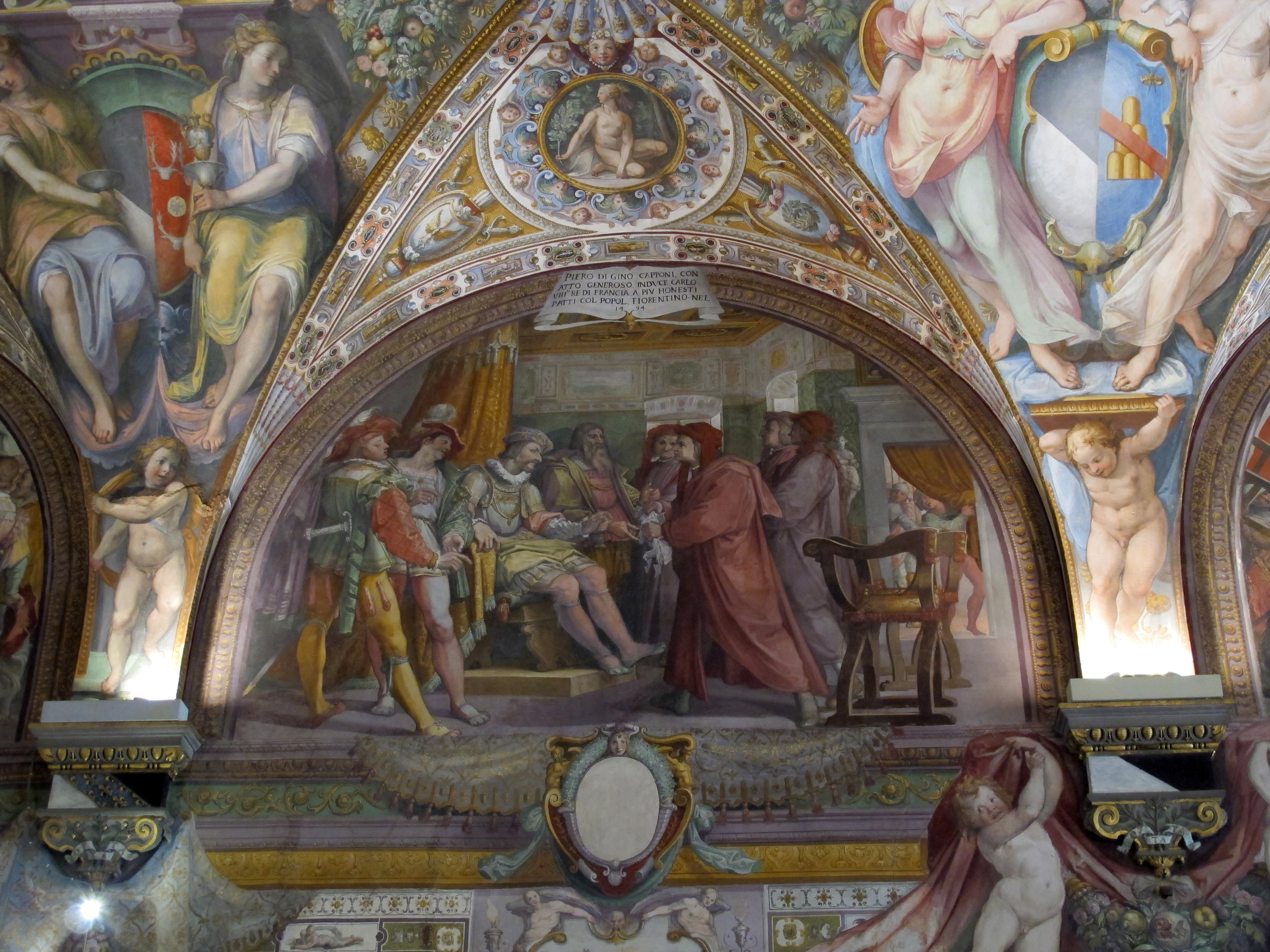
Capponi holds torn treaty in front of a seated King Charles VIII: 1583–85 fresco in main hall of Palazzo Capponi-Vettori, By Bernardo Poccetti.

In November 1494 on his way to Naples from Milan, Charles and his large army passed through Lucca into Tuscan territory, occupying Pisa, a city still restless after the Florentine subjugation in 1406. He was allowed to enter and welcomed into Florence on November 17 with his army, and immediately began to behave as though he were the conqueror of the city. The Republican Signoria was anxious to be on good terms with him, but he began to imply he would mediate the relationship of France to Pisa and the future role of the deposed Piero de' Medici in Florence. Additionally, he requested a loan of 150,000 ducats to help fund his enterprise. Piero and his fellow Republican councilors were unwilling to accede to such demands. The temper of the city soon changed, and the citizens began to prepare for the possibility of an urban war with French soldiers already billeted inside the walls.

The Florentine republic was willing to pay the French monarch a large sum of money, but in settling the amount further disagreements arose. Charles finally presented an ultimatum to the Council of the Signoria, and if his demands were declined, he threatened

Then we shall sound our trumpets.

An angered Capponi ripped up the written demands before the King himself, and replied

And we shall toll our bells.

Charles, who did not relish the idea of house-to-house fighting, moderated his demands and concluded a more equitable treaty with the republic. The final treaty ultimately did not insist on Pisan independence from Florence or on a reimposition of the expelled Medici. The total payment was reduced and split into allotments over a year.

On November 28 Charles VIII departed Florence, and Capponi was appointed to reform the government of Florence. But being more at home in the camp than in the council chamber, he was glad of the opportunity of leading the armies of the republic against the Pisan rebels. He proved a most capable general, but while besieging the castle of Soiana, he was killed on 25 September 1496. His death was greatly regretted, for the Florentines recognized in him their ablest statesman and warrior.

Piero's son, Niccolò Capponi, was elected Gonfaloniero di Giustizia in 1527, but died in 1529, after the Medici restoration.

== See also ==
- Italian Wars
