= List of shipwrecks in July 1876 =

The list of shipwrecks in July 1876 includes ships sunk, foundered, grounded, or otherwise lost during July 1876.

== 1 July ==
List of shipwrecks: 1 July 1876
Ship	State	Description
Brothers	United Kingdom	The schooner foundered off Newport, Monmouthshire with the loss of her captain. Survivors were rescued by the schooner Dahlia (United Kingdom). Brothers was on a voyage from Newport to Bristol, Gloucestershire.
Condora	Italy	The ship was wrecked on the Krishna Shoal. Her crew were rescued. She was on a voyage from Rangoon, Burma to the English Channel.
Jane and Esther	United Kingdom	The ship struck rocks off Chausey, Manche, France and sank. Her crew were rescued. She was on a voyage from Hartlepool, County Durham to Granville, Manche.

== 2 July ==
List of shipwrecks: 2 July 1876
Ship	State	Description
British King	United Kingdom	The ship was sighted in the South Atlantic whils on a voyage from San Francisco, California, United States to Liverpool, Lancashire. No further trace, presumed foundered with the loss of all hands.
Contractor	United Kingdom	The tug was run into by the steamship Galilee (France) and was beached at Cardiff, Glamorgan and was beached.
Lady Franklyn	New Zealand	The 235-ton barque went ashore at Kaipara Harbour when her anchor cable parted. She was refloated but became uncontrollable and regrounded, thus becoming a wreck.
South of England	United Kingdom	The steamship ran aground on the Hats and Barrels, or The Smalls, Cornwall. She was reported to be on a voyage from Liverpool, Lancashire to London. She was refloated and resumed her voyage but foundered the next day off St. Ann's Head, Pembrokeshire. All on board survived.

== 3 July ==
List of shipwrecks: 3 July 1876
Ship	State	Description
Coki Cuman	Japan	The junk was abandoned in the Pacific Ocean (37°10′N 167°35′E), ten of her twelve crew having died. Survivors were rescued by the barque Aubrey Cowper (United Kingdom).
Hildegaard	Norway	The ship caught fire at Thameshaven, Essex. She was on a voyage from New York, United States to London, United Kingdom.
Magdala	United Kingdom	The steamship ran aground on a reef 5 nautical miles (9.3 km) off Tripoli, Ottoman Tripolitania. She was on a voyage from Alexandria, Egypt to Tripoli. She was refloated and taken in to Malta for repairs.

== 4 July ==
List of shipwrecks: 4 July 1876
Ship	State	Description
Norma	United Kingdom	The barque was driven ashore on Cape Sable Island, Nova Scotia, Canada. Her crew survived. She was on a voyage from Saint John, New Brunswick, Canada to Liverpool, Lancashire. She floated off and was taken in tow by an American schooner, but the tow had to be abandoned.
Tees	United Kingdom	The steamship ran aground at Bilbao, Spain. She was on a voyage from Middlesbrough, Yorkshire to Bilbao.
Triton	United Kingdom	The schooner sprang a leak and foundered 4 nautical miles (7.4 km) east south east of Little Orme Head, Caernarfonshire.

== 5 July ==
List of shipwrecks: 5 July 1876
Ship	State	Description
Clio	United Kingdom	The barque collided with the steamship Narenta ( Trieste) and sank in the English Channel 6 nautical miles (11 km) south west of the Royal Sovereign Lightship ( Trinity House) with the loss of two of her ten crew. Clio was on a voyage from "Cabes" or "Kabea", Africa to Newcastle upon Tyne, Northumberland.
Gloria	Italy	The brig was driven ashore at Apeshill, Gibraltar. She was on a voyage from New York, United States to Trieste.
Oseco	United Kingdom	The barque sprang a leak and was abandoned in the Indian Ocean (32°59′S 30°45′E). All on board took to a boat; they were rescued by Philosopher (United Kingdom). Oseco. was on a voyage from Akyab, Burma to Falmouth, Cornwall.

== 6 July ==
List of shipwrecks: 6 July 1876
Ship	State	Description
Challenge	United States	The fishing Schooner was wrecked on the Maine coast. Her crew were rescued.
Cif	Norway	The steamship sprang a leak and sank. Her crew survived. She was on a voyage from Memel, Germany to Moss.

== 7 July ==
List of shipwrecks: 7 July 1876
Ship	State	Description
Arctic	United States	The 431-ton whaler, a barque, was crushed in ice in the Chukchi Sea 20 nautical miles (37 km; 23 mi) off Point Franklin on the coast of the Department of Alaska. Her crew reached shore and was rescued by the whaling barque Onward (United States).
Clotaire	France	The ship was driven ashore on Langlade Island. She was declared a total loss.
Nuphar	United Kingdom	The steamship ran aground at Dunkirk, Nord, France. She was on a voyage from Constanţa, Ottoman Empire to Dunkirk.
Raven	United Kingdom	The Mersey Flat was run into by Enterprise (United Kingdom) and was beached at Egremont, Lancashire in a sinking condition.
W. Harkness	United Kingdom	The ship ran aground at Galway. She was on a voyage from Sulina, Ottoman Empire to Galway.

== 8 July ==
List of shipwrecks: 8 July 1876
Ship	State	Description
Ella	United Kingdom	The yacht was run down and sunk at Gourock, Renfrewshire by the steamship Marquis of Lorne (United Kingdom).
Henri	Flag unknown	The barque ran aground at Cuxhaven, Germany. She was on a voyage from Iquique, Chile to Hamburg, Germany. She was refloated the next day with assistance.
Medora	United Kingdom	The steamship was driven ashore and wrecked 35 nautical miles (65 km) north of Cape St. Vincent, Portugal. All on board were rescued; ten crew were rescued by the steamship Barita (United Kingdom). Medora was on a voyage from Cardiff, Glamorgan to Marseille, Bouches-du-Rhône, France.
Monrovia	United Kingdom	The steamship was wrecked on Carpenter's Rock, off the coast of Sierra Leone. Her crew were rescued. She was on a voyage from Liverpool, Lancashire to Africa.
Skane	Sweden	The brig ran aground. She was on a voyage from West Hartlepool, County Durham, United Kingdom to Strömsholm. She was refloated and resumed her voyage.
Tjin Eng Lie	Netherlands	The barque sank at Samarang, Netherlands East Indies.

== 9 July ==
List of shipwrecks: 9 July 1876
Ship	State	Description
Tortola	United Kingdom	The ship foundered off Cerignola, Italy. She was on a voyage from Cyprus to Cork.
Union	Germany	The steamship exploded and caught fire 6 nautical miles (11 km) off Bornholm, Denmark. She was abandoned with the loss of one life. Union was on a voyage from Saint Petersburg, Russia to Lübeck.
Waakzamlier	Belgium	The fishing sloop sprang a leak and foundered in the North Sea 14 nautical miles (26 km) off Berwick upon Tweed, Northumberland, United Kingdom. Her five crew were rescued by the fishing sloop Hallemarch (Belgium).

== 10 July ==
List of shipwrecks: 10 July 1876
Ship	State	Description
Agnes Campbell	United Kingdom	The ship was driven ashore at Ardrossan, Ayrshire. She was refloated.
Camille	France	The steamship ran aground and was damaged at Adra, Spain.
Elise Marie	Germany	The ship foundered in the North Sea. Her crew were rescued by the smack Melbourne (United Kingdom). Elise Marie was on a voyage from Antwerp, Belgium to Wolgast.
Goldstream	United Kingdom	The schooner ran aground on the Dovran Rock and became waterlogged. She was on a voyage from Boston to Donegal.
Newsky	United Kingdom	The steamship ran aground on the Whitton Middle Sand, in the Humber. She was on a voyage from Goole, Yorkshire to London. She was refloated the next day but consequently sank.
Roycroft	United Kingdom	The barque ran aground on the Arklow Bank, in the Irish Sea off the coast of County Wicklow.
St. Clair	United States	The steamship was destroyed by fire on Lake Superior with the loss of 27 lives.

== 11 July ==
List of shipwrecks: 11 July 1876
Ship	State	Description
Christine Allida	Netherlands	The schooner ran aground at Falsterbo, Sweden. She was on a voyage from Memel, Germany to Delfshaven, South Holland. She was refloated and taken in to Copenhagen, Denmark for repairs.
Halley	United Kingdom	The steamship ran aground in the River Shannon. She was on a voyage from Sulina, Ottoman Empire to Limerick.
Raphael	United Kingdom	The ship ran aground at Liverpool, Lancashire. She was on a voyage from Saint John, New Brunswick, Canada to Liverpool. She was refloated with the assistance of four tugs and taken in to Liverpool.

== 12 July ==
List of shipwrecks: 12 July 1876
Ship	State	Description
Anine	United Kingdom	The yacht foundered off Ailsa Craig.
Rachel	United Kingdom	The ship sprang a leak and was beached at Sheerness, Kent. She was on a voyage from Antwerp, Belgium to Runcorn, Cheshire.
Unnamed	Germany	The lugger was driven ashore and wrecked in the Shetland Islands, United Kingdom.

== 13 July ==
List of shipwrecks: 13 July 1876
Ship	State	Description
City of Manchester	United Kingdom	The steam yacht ran aground in Liverpool Bay. She was refloated.
Demarchi	Italy	The barque was driven ashore 7 nautical miles (13 km) west north west of Maryport, Cumberland, United Kingdom. She was on a voyage from Baltimore, Maryland, United States to Silloth, Cumberland. She was refloated and taken in to Silloth.
Wider	Sweden	The ship capsized at Lummelunda, Gotland. Her crew were rescued. She was on a voyage from Oscarshamn to Apenrade, Denmark.
Unnamed	Flag unknown	The yacht ran aground in Liverpool Bay.

== 14 July ==
List of shipwrecks: 14 July 1876
Ship	State	Description
Coral Isle	United Kingdom	The brig ran aground and was wrecked on the Filsand. She was on a voyage from Kronstadt, Russia to an English port.
Daisy	United Kingdom	The ship was sighted whilst on a voyage from Kronstadt to Helsingør, Denmark. No further trace, presumed foundered in the Baltic Sea with the loss of all hands.
Dimvara Castle	United Kingdom	The ship foundered in the Atlantic Ocean with the loss of all hands, according to a message in a bottle that washed up at Campbeltown, Argyllshire in late July.
HMS Thunderer	Royal Navy	The boiler of HMS Thunderer after the explosion. The Devastation-class ironclad suffered a boiler explosion that killed 45 of her crew and injured 40 others.
Widar	Sweden	The ship capsized at Lummelunda, Gotland. Her crew were rescued. She was on a voyage from Oscarshamn to Åbenrå, Dehmark.

== 15 July ==
List of shipwrecks: 15 July 1876
Ship	State	Description
Acme	New South Wales	The Davis & Copper-owned schooner ran aground on Seal Rocks.
Garland	United Kingdom	The ship ran aground off the Keibir Lighthouse. She was on a voyage from Cartagena, Spain to Newcastle upon Tyne, Northumberland.
Marienburg	United Kingdom	The steamship ran aground at "Sassholmen". She was on a voyage from Riga, Russia to Southampton, Hampshire, United Kingdom.
Minister Achenbach	Germany	The steamship was driven ashore at Riga. She was on a voyage from Newcastle upon Tyne to Riga. She was refloated on 20 July and taken in to Riga.
M. Moxham	United Kingdom	The steamship sprang a leak and ran aground at Havre de Grâce, Seine-Inférieure, France. She was on a voyage from Cardiff, Glamorgan to Havre de Grâce.
Sorensen	Norway	The schooner was driven ashore at Fotosund. She was on a voyage from Sunderland, County Durham, United Kingdom to Holmstadt.

== 16 July ==
List of shipwrecks: 16 July 1876
Ship	State	Description
Lemland	Russia	The schooner was driven ashore and wrecked at Fjaltring, Denmark. Her crew were rescued. She was on a voyage from Hull, Yorkshire, United Kingdom to Luleå, Sweden.
Nueva Julianne	Spain	The barque was damaged by an onboard explosion at Cardiff, Glamorgan, United Kingdom.

== 17 July ==
List of shipwrecks: 17 July 1876
Ship	State	Description
Anglian	United Kingdom	The steamship ran aground on the Goodwin Sands, Kent. She was refloated and resumed her voyage.
Douro	Spain	The steamship was wrecked off Cape Trafalgar. All on board were rescued. She was on a voyage from Barcelona to A Coruña.
Electric	United Kingdom	The steamship arrived at Liverpool, Lancashire from Belfast, County Antrim on fire. The fire was extinguished.
Nord	Sweden	The brigantine ran aground on the Goodwin Sands. She was on a voyage from Havre de Grâce, Seine-Inférieure, France to Stockholm. She was refloated and resumed her voyage.
Sussex	Canada	The brig was partly abandoned in the Atlantic Ocean That portion of the crew being rescued by the barque Rosalina (Italy). Sussex was on a voyage from Wilmington, Delaware to Queenstown, County Cork, United Kingdom. Those left aboard were rescued two days later by Paolo Rivello (Italy). Sussex foundered on 27 July.
Tamisa	United Kingdom	The clipper departed from Hiogo for Yokohama, Japan. No further trace, presumed foundered with the loss of all hands, about twenty lives.
Unnamed	Flag unknown	The barque ran aground on the Goodwin Sands. She was refloated and resumed her voyage.

== 18 July ==
List of shipwrecks: 18 July 1876
Ship	State	Description
Albert	United Kingdom	The steamship was driven ashore at Spurn Point, Yorkshire. She was on a voyage from Hull, Yorkshire to Antwerp, Belgium. She was refloated and resumed her voyage.
Banana	Jamaica	The ship departed from Port Antonio for Kingston. No further trace, presumed foundered with the loss of all hands.
Essea	Germany	The galiot was driven ashore and wrecked at Lemvig, Denmark with some loss of life. She was on a voyage from Kristiansand, Norway to "Rushershid".
Sugarcane	Jamaica	The sloop departed from Spring Garden Beach for Kingston. No further trace, presumed foundered with the loss of all hands.
Tamesa	United Kingdom	The ship departed from Hiogo for Yokohama, Japan. No further trace, presumed foundered with the loss of all nineteen crew.

== 19 July ==
List of shipwrecks: 19 July 1876
Ship	State	Description
Christina	Germany	The schooner foundered in the North Sea 120 nautical miles (220 km) east by north of Spurn Point, Yorkshire, United Kingdom. Her crew were rescued by the smack Zoe (United Kingdom). Christina was on a voyage from Hull, Yorkshire to a Danish port.

== 20 July ==
List of shipwrecks: 20 July 1876
Ship	State	Description
Carmen	Spain	The ship ran aground on the Courland Bank. She was on a voyage from Queenstown, County Cork to London, United Kingdom. She was refloated and resumed her voyage.
Charlotte Gladstone	United Kingdom	The ship collided with Colombo (United Kingdom) in the Firth of Clyde. She put in to Greenock, Renfrewshire in a waterlogged condition.
Fairy Queen	United Kingdom	The steamship ran aground and was wrecked 6 nautical miles (11 km) from Campbeltown, Argyllshire. All on board were rescued.
Golden Wave	United Kingdom	The barque ran aground on the Tonnenplaat, in the North Sea off Goeree, Zeeland, Netherlands. She was refloated and taken in to Hellevoetsluis, Zeeland, where she ran aground.
Mohawk	United States	The yacht capsized and sank on her maiden voyage in New York Harbor off Stapleton, Staten Island, during an unexpected squall. 2 passengers and 1 crewman survived. She was later raised, repaired, and renamed Eagre and served with the United States Coast and Geodetic Survey and United States Navy.

== 22 July ==
List of shipwrecks: 22 July 1876
Ship	State	Description
Dagmar	United Kingdom	The ship collided with the steamship W. Harkness (United Kingdom) in the Atlantic Ocean 80 nautical miles (150 km) south west of The Lizard, Cornwall and was severely damaged. Dagmar was towed in to Plymouth, Devon in a waterlogged condition by W. Harkhess.
Florist	United Kingdom	The brigantine ran aground at Maassluis, South Holland, Netherlands. She was on a voyage from Newcastle upon Tyne, Northumberland to Rotterdam, South Holland. She was refloated and found to be severely leaky.
Newcastle	United Kingdom	The steamship was driven ashore at Kettleness, Yorkshire. She was on a voyage from Newcastle upon Tyne to Hull, Yorkshire. She was refloated with the assistance of the tug Emu (United Kingdom) and completed her voyage.

== 23 July ==
List of shipwrecks: 23 July 1876
Ship	State	Description
Coronella	United Kingdom	The ship was driven ashore and wrecked near Bahia, Brazil. She was on a voyage from Bahia to London.

== 24 July ==
List of shipwrecks: 24 July 1876
Ship	State	Description
Barrington	United Kingdom	The steamship ran aground at Havre de Grâce, Seine-Inférieure, France. She was refloated on 31 July and towed in the Havre de Grâce.
Bunin	Italy	The barque was driven ashore at Breaksea Point, Glamorgan, United Kingdom. She was on a voyage from Cardiff, Glamorgan to Liverpool She was refloated and put back to Cardiff.
Coq Du Village	New Zealand	The 312-ton wooden barque went ashore at Petane Beach near Napier during a gale, and became a wreck. All crew were rescued.
Disquiet	United Kingdom	The ship sank Bergen, Norway. She was on a voyage from West Hartlepool, County Durham to Bergen.
Harold	United Kingdom	The steamship ran aground near Ross, County Wexford. She was on a voyage from Sulina, Ottoman Empire to New Ross, County Wexford.
Minnie	United Kingdom	The schooner collided with Queen of Beauty (United Kingdom) and was beached at New Ferry, Cheshire.
Opal	United Kingdom	The schooner ran aground on the Barber Sand, in the North Sea off the coast of Norfolk. She was on a voyage from Middlesbrough, Yorkshire to Great Yarmouth, Norfolk. She was refloated with the assistance of a tug and assisted in to Great Yarmouth in a leaky condition.
Tweed	United Kingdom	The brigantine was driven ashore at Devil's Point. She was on a voyage from South Shields, County Durham to Devonport, Devon. She was refloated with assistance from the tug Sir Walter Raleigh (United Kingdom and beached at Plymouth, Devon.

== 25 July ==
List of shipwrecks: 25 July 1876
Ship	State	Description
Figlio d'Italia	Italy	The ship ran aground on the Sovereign Rock, in the English Channel off the coast of Sussex, United Kingdom. She was on a voyage from South Shields, County Durham, United Kingdom to Alexandria, Egypt. She was refloated and resumed her voyage.
No. 10	United Kingdom	The pilot boat ran aground on the Castle Rocks, off Falmouth, Cornwall.

== 26 July ==
List of shipwrecks: 26 July 1876
Ship	State	Description
Hope	New Zealand	The 21-ton cutter was wrecked when she was inundated by a heavy swell and driven onto rocks at Moeraki, New Zealand. Her crew survived, being rescued by the steamer Shag (New Zealand).
Iberia	Flag unknown	The ship foundered off Nash Point, Glamorgan, United Kingdom.
Leonie Celine	France	The schooner ran aground on the Gurnard Ledge, off the Isle of Wight, United Kingdom. She was on a voyage from Portsmouth, Hampshire, United Kingdom to Roscoff, Finistère.
Solway	United Kingdom	The steamship was driven ashore at Cape Takli, Russia. She was refloated and taken in to Kertch, Russia in a leaky condition.
Victoria	United Kingdom	The ketch ran aground on the Pennington Spit, off the Isle of Wight. She was on a voyage from Porthcawl, Glamorgan to Lymington, Hampshire.

== 27 July ==
List of shipwrecks: 27 July 1876
Ship	State	Description
Belfort	France	The ship was sighted in the Atlantic Ocean whilst on a voyage from Lagos, Lagos Colony to a Channel port. No further trace, presumed foundered with the loss of all hands.
Campbeltown	United Kingdom	The schooner was driven ashore on the Mull of Kintyre, Argyllshire. She was on a voyage from Runcorn, Cheshire to Londonderry. She was refloated with assistanced from the steamship Staffa (United Kingdom) and towed in to Campbeltown, Argyllshire in a leaky condition.
Columba	United Kingdom	The steamship was driven ashore. She was on a voyage from Grimsby, Lincolnshire to Barcelona, Spain. She was refloated and taken in to Barcelona in a sinking condition.
Columbia	United Kingdom	The brigantine sprang a leak and foundered in the North Sea 15 nautical miles (28 km) off Scarborough, Yorkshire. Her crew were rescued by the smack Commodore (United Kingdom). Columbo was on a voyage from Alloa, Clackmannanshire to Poole, Dorset.
Friend's Endeavour	United Kingdom	The smack foundered in the North Sea off Ameland, Friesland, Netherlands. Her five crew survived.
George	United States	The ship was driven ashore on Reedy Island, Delaware. She was on a voyage from Livorno, Italy to Philadelphia, Pennsylvania.
Jettina	Netherlands	The schooner was driven ashore at "Iverstad", on the west coast of Jutland. She was on a voyage from Rotterdam, South Holland to Königsberg, Germany.
Northampton	United States	The ship was driven ashore at Woody Point, Isle of Wight, United Kingdom. She was on a voyage from Havre de Grâce, Seine-Inférieure, France to New Orleans, Louisiana. She was refloated with assistance from the Coastguard and resumed her voyage.

== 28 July ==
List of shipwrecks: 28 July 1876
Ship	State	Description
Admiral	United Kingdom	The schooner caught fire at Sunderland, County Durham.
Dinorah	United Kingdom	The barque collided with the steamship Dorunda (United Kingdom) and sank with the loss of ten of her crew. Dinorah was on a voyage from South Shields, County Durham to Brindisi, Italy.
Elizabeth	United Kingdom	The ship foundered, according to a message in a bottle that washed up between Hartlepool and Seaham, County Durham in mid-August.
Hillsborough	United Kingdom	The schooner was abandoned in the Bristol Channel 30 nautical miles (56 km) west north west of Lundy Island, Devon. Her three crew were rescued by the barque Pellegra Figari (Italy).
Lucien	United Kingdom	The barque foundered in the North Sea 130 nautical miles (240 km) east north east of Hartlepool, County Durham. Her crew were rescued by the brig Laura (Norway). Lucien was on a voyage from Hartlepool to Helsingør.

== 29 July ==
List of shipwrecks: 29 July 1876
Ship	State	Description
Alethea	United Kingdom	The steamship ran aground on the Middlegrund, in the Baltic Sea. She was on a voyage from West Hartlepool, County Durham to Kronstadt, Russia.
Janet Izat	United Kingdom	The ship ran aground at Stockholm, Sweden. She was on a voyage from South Shields, County Durham to Stockholm. She was refloated and taken in to Stockholm in a leaky condition.
Jessie	United Kingdom	The ship, a cutter or a sloop, was run down and sunk in the Dogger Bank by Nornen (United Kingdom). Her crew were rescued by Catharina Elizabeth (Netherlands). Jessie was on a voyage from Fraserburgh, Aberdeenshire to Hamburg, Germany.
Wallachia	Sweden	The steamship was driven ashore at Trelleborg. She was refloated on 3 August with the assistance of two steamships and was towed in to Copenhagen, Denmark.

== 30 July ==
List of shipwrecks: 30 July 1876
Ship	State	Description
Adeline Elwood	United States	The ship was destroyed by fire at Cette, Hérault, France.
Carl	Germany	The ship ran aground at Farø, Denmark and sank. She was on a voyage from Rivalto, Italy to Lübeck.
Margaret	United Kingdom	The brigantine ran aground on the Middle Shoebury Sand, in the Thames Estuary off the coast of Essex. She was on a voyage from Guernsey, Channel Islands to London. She was refloated with the assistance of the Coastguard.
Stewart Lane	United Kingdom	The ship sprang a leak and was abandoned in the South Atlantic. Her crew were rescued by Bianca Casanova (Flag unknown). Stewart Lane was on a voyage from the Isla de Lobos, Uruguay to Queenstown, County Cork.

== 31 July ==
List of shipwrecks: 31 July 1876
Ship	State	Description
Atalanta	United Kingdom	The steamship ran aground on the Middelgrund, in the Baltic Sea. She was on a voyage from Newcastle upon Tyne, Northumberland to Kronstadt, Russia.
Commisary	United Kingdom	The ship ran aground on Los Cabezas, off Tarifa, Spain. She was on a voyage from Newcastle upon Tyne to "Garmeha". She was refloated and taken in to Cádiz, Spain in a severely leaky condition and was beached.
Famiglia Prima	Italy	The ship was destroyed by fire at Penmon, Anglesey, United Kingdom. Her crew were rescued. She was on a voyage from Sligo to Cardiff, Glamorgan, United Kingdom.
Forth	United Kingdom	The brig was driven ashore at Ravenglass, Cumberland. She was on a voyage from Dublin to Whitehaven, Cumberland.
Jane Bacon	United Kingdom	The steamship was driven ashore at Honfleur, Manche, France. She was on a voyage from Cardiff to Rouen, Seine-Inférieure, France. She was refloated with the assistance of a steamship and completed her voyage.
Jordan	United Kingdom	The schooner ran aground at Hirsholmene, Denmark. She was on a voyage from Oscarshamn, Sweden to Newcastle upon Tyne, Northumberland. She was refloated and resumed her voyage.
Kestrel	United Kingdom	The steamship sprang a leak and was beached at Portsmouth, Hampshire. She was on a voyage from Liverpool, Lancashire to Rotterdam, South Holland, Netherlands.
Mimosa	United Kingdom	The steamship ran aground on the Calchina Shoal, in the Bosphorus. She was on a voyage from Middlesbrough, Yorkshire to Taganrog, Russia. She was refloated on 1 August and resumed her voyage.
N. W. Blethen	United Kingdom	The ship capsized in a hurricane in the Atlantic Ocean with the loss of twenty of her 24 crew. Survivors were rescued on 2 August by C. E. Jane (United States). N. W. Blethen was on a voyage from Baltimore to London.
Saint Ouge	France	The ship was driven ashore near "Haedix". She was on a voyage from Cardiff, Glamorgan, United Kingdom to "Pouligurn".

== Unknown date ==
List of shipwrecks: Unknown date in July 1876
Ship	State	Description
Africaine	France	The ship was wrecked in the Cape Verde Islands. Her crew were rescued. She was on a voyage from Marseille, Bouches-du-Rhône to Whydah, Dahomey.
Argo	United Kingdom	The steam yacht was driven ashore on the Norwegian coast before 11 July. All on board survived. She was on a voyage from Liverpool, Lancashire to Trondheim, Norway.
Chaa-Sze	United Kingdom	The ship was wrecked 20 nautical miles (37 km) from Cayenne, French Guiana. Her crew were rescued. She was on a voyage from London to Cayenne.
Colima, or Colino	United Kingdom	The steamship was driven ashore on Flat Island. She was on a voyage from Montreal, Quebec, Canada to Glasgow, Renfrewshire. She was refloated and resumed her voyage.
Colombo	United Kingdom	The brigantine foundered in the North Sea. Her crew were rescued by a fishing smack. She was on a voyage from Alva, Clackmannanshire to Poole, Dorset.
Ellen Kerr	United Kingdom	The schooner ran aground on the Goodwin Sands. She was on a voyage from Boulogne, Pas-de-Calais, France to Hull, Yorkshire. She was refloated and taken in to The Downs.
Flamborough	United Kingdom	The ship was driven ashore at Bonaventure, Quebec. She was on a voyage from Pictou, Nova Scotia to Montreal. She was refloated and resumed her voyage.
Georgia	United States	The steamship was driven ashore and wrecked in the Strait of Magellan before 7 July. She was on a voyage from New York to San Francisco, California.
Glenora	United Kingdom	The brigantine was wrecked in Gabarus Bay, Cape Breton Island, Nova Scotia before 8 July. She was on a voyage from Liverpool to Halifax, Nova Scotia.
Jalapa	Flag unknown	The ship was driven ashore at "Marquis". She was on a voyage from Laguna to Hamburg, Germany. She was refloated and taken in to Key West, Florida, United States in a leaky condition.
Job Johnson	United States	The fishing schooner collided with Frank (United Kingdom) on the Grand Banks of Newfoundland and sank. Her crew were rescued.
Lightning	United Kingdom	The ship was driven ashore at "Trowbridge", South Australia. Her passengers were taken off. She was on a voyage from London to Adelaide, South Australia. She was later refloated.
Lolland	Denmark	The steamship struck a sunken rock at Nakskov and sank. She was on a voyage from Newcastle upon Tyne, Northumberland, United Kingdom to Nakskov. She was refloated on 19 August and taken in to Malmö, Sweden for repairs.
L. W. Eaton	Canada	The brig was abandoned at sea before 12 July. Her crew were rescued by Europa (United States). L. W. Eaton was on a voyage from Saint John, New Brunswick to Dublin, United Kingdom.
Maria	Austria-Hungary	The barque was wrecked in the Magdalen Islands, Nova Scotia. She was on a voyage from a Canadian port to London.
Marie Anne	United Kingdom	The schooner ran aground at Maassluis, South Holland, Netherlands. She was on a voyage from Rotterdam, South Holland to the River Tyne. She was refloated and resumed her voyage but put in to the Humber to be caulked. She completed her voyage on 28 July.
Mimosa	United Kingdom	The ship ran aground on the Calchina Shoal. She was refloated on 31 July.
Montevideo	Germany	The steamship ran aground and was severely damaged at Santos, Brazil.
Nellie T. Guest	Canada	The ship struck the South Rock, in the Belfast Lough. She was on a voyage from Philadelphia, Pennsylvania, United States to Belfast, County Antrim, United Kingdom. She was refloated and towed in to Belfast.
Nymphœa	United Kingdom	The ship was driven ashore in the Sea of Azov. She was on a voyage from Constantinople, Ottoman Empire to Taganrog, Russia. She was refloated and taken in to Genoa, Italy.
P. Beland	Netherlands	The steamship ran aground at Hoek van Holland, South Holland. She was on a voyage from New York to Rotterdam. She was refloated with assistance.
Planet	Germany	The brigantine was abandoned at sea. Her crew were rescued by J. C. Robinson (United Kingdom). Planet was on a voyage from Valparaíso, Chile to the Rio Grande.
Prado	Spain	The ship was driven ashore at Cape St. Vincent, Portugal. She was on a voyage from Huelva to Liverpool, Lancashire. She was refloated and taken in to Lisbon, Portugal in a leaky condition.
Puritan	United Kingdom	The ship was abandoned at sea before 5 July. Her crew were rescued.
Rivulet	United Kingdom	The schooner foundered in the Atlantic Ocean in late July. Her crew were rescued b y the barque Norena (United States). Rivulet was on a voyage from the Rio Grande do Sul to Whitehaven, Cumberland.
Roycroft	United States	The ship ran aground on the Arklow Bank, in the Irish Sea off the coast of County Wicklow.
Serantes	United Kingdom	The steamship was driven ashore. She was on a voyage from Kronstadt, Russia to Rotterdam. She was refloated and taken in to Copenhagen, Denmark.
St. Mark	United States	The ship was wrecked. Her crew were rescued.
Thorvald	Netherlands	The ship ran aground on the Sandiskand Spit and sank before 10 July. She was on a voyage from Pascagoula, Mississippi, United States to Cherbourg, Seine-Inférieure, France.
W. W. Lloyd	United Kingdom	The brig ran aground on Moon Cay. She was on a voyage from Jamaica to London.
Zemindar	United Kingdom	The ship was destroyed by fire at sea. Her crew were rescued. She was on a voyage from Demerara, British Guiana to Liverpool.
Unnamed	Brazil	The steamship sank at Brest, Finistère, France. She was refloated on 5 September.
