= Orciatico =

- Frazione
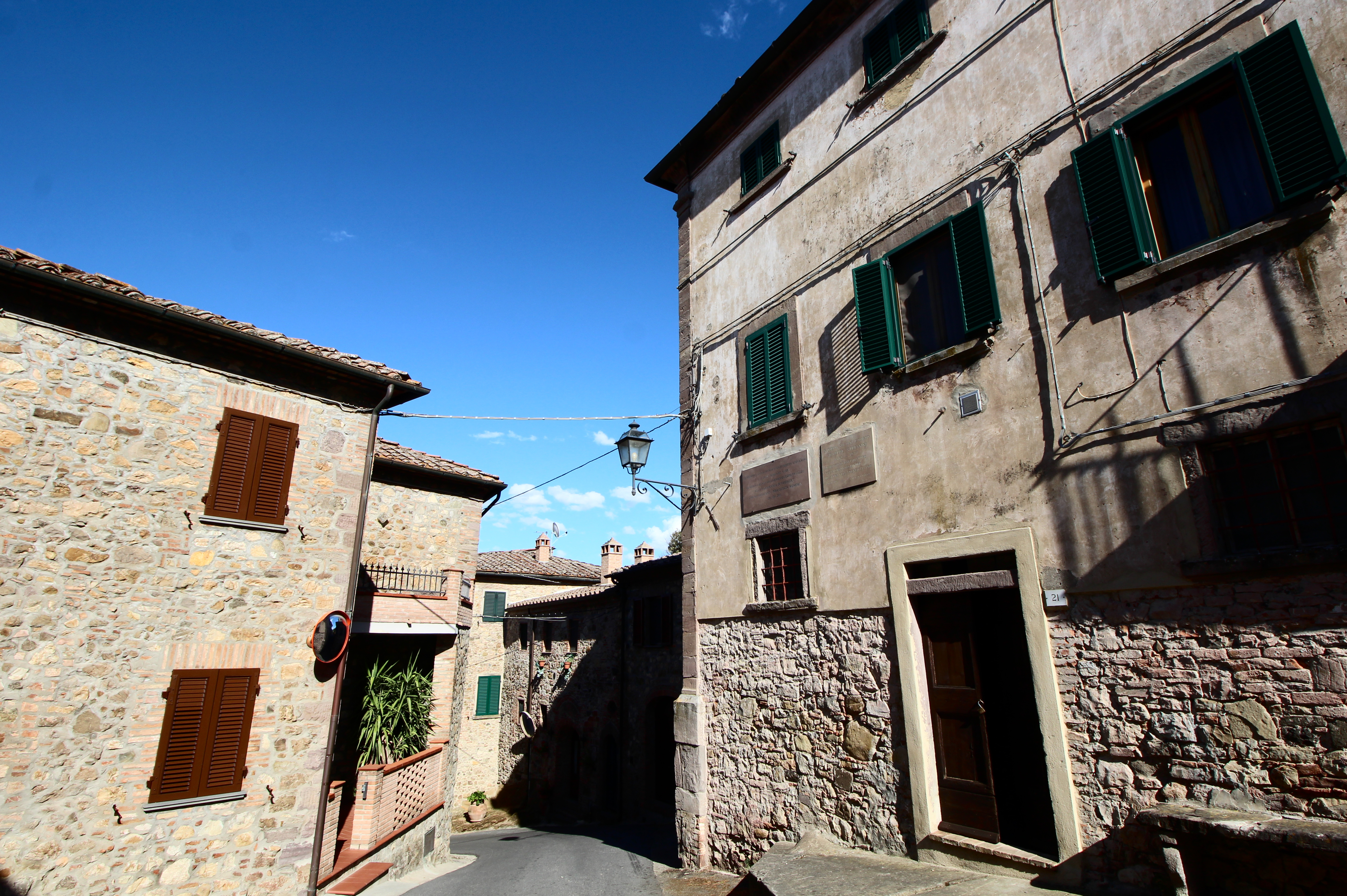

- Location of Orciatico in Italy
- Coordinates: 43°26′7″N 10°43′23″E
- Country: Italy
- Region: Tuscany
- Province: Pisa (PI)
- Comune: Lajatico
- Elevation: 321 m (1,053 ft)

Population (2011)
  - Total: 211
- Demonym: Orciatichini
- Time zone: UTC+1 (CET)
  - Summer (DST): UTC+2 (CEST)
- Postal code: 56030
- Dialing code: (+39) 0587

Orciatico is a village in Tuscany, central Italy, administratively a frazione of the comune of Lajatico, province of Pisa. At the time of the 2001 census its population was 213.

Orciatico is about 57 km from Pisa and 7 km from Lajatico.
