= Selvatelle =

- Frazione
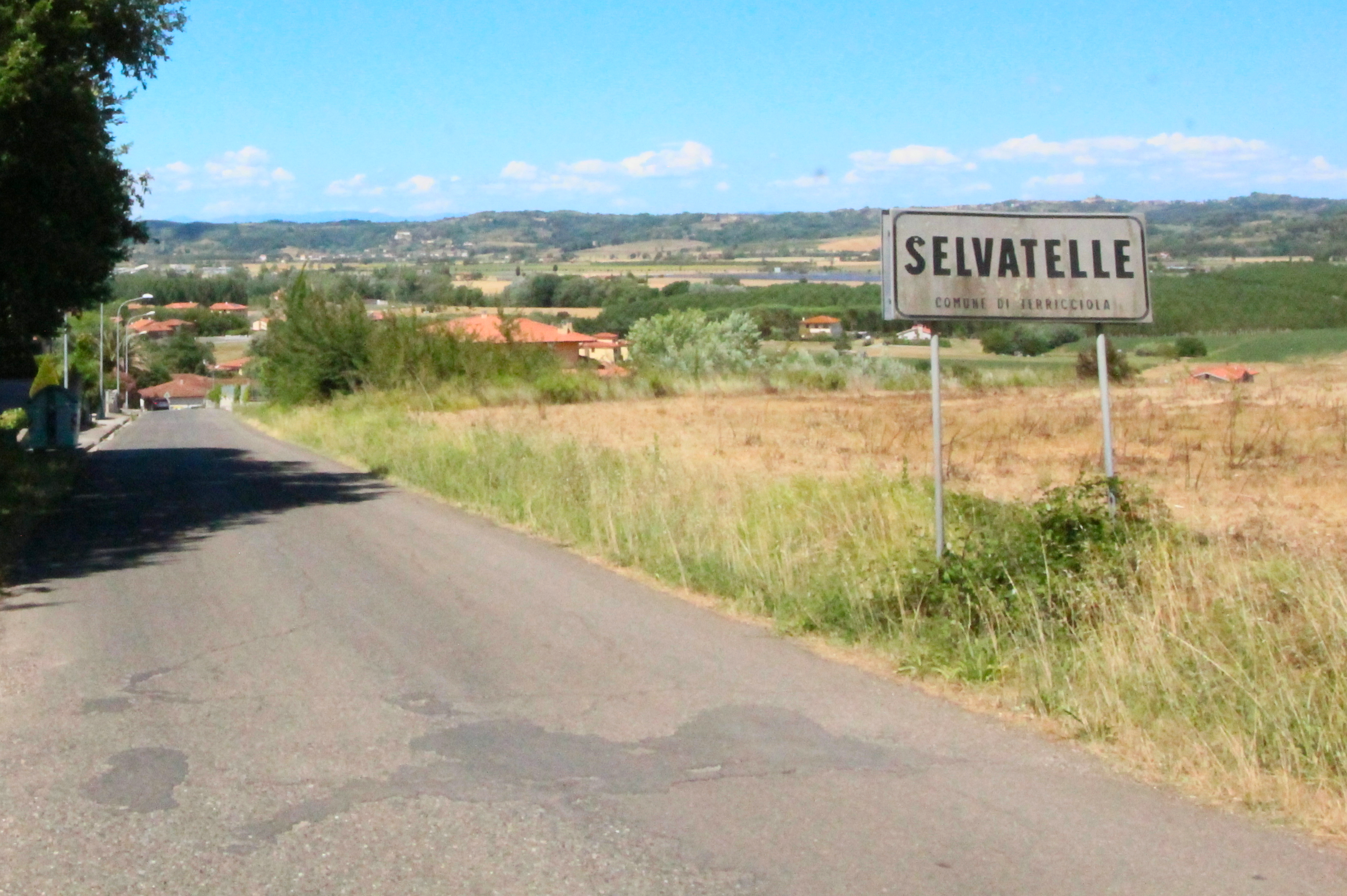

- Location of Selvatelle in Italy
- Coordinates: 43°33′37″N 10°41′32″E
- Country: Italy
- Region: Tuscany
- Province: Pisa (PI)
- Comune: Terricciola
- Elevation: 50 m (160 ft)

Population (2011)
  - Total: 1,302
- Time zone: UTC+1 (CET)
  - Summer (DST): UTC+2 (CEST)
- Postal code: 56030
- Dialing code: (+39) 0587

Selvatelle is a village in Tuscany, central Italy, administratively a frazione of the comune of Terricciola, province of Pisa. At the time of the 2001 census its population was 924.

Selvatelle is about 40 km from Pisa and 5 km from Terricciola.
