= La Rosa, Terricciola =

La Rosa
- Frazione
- Location of La Rosa in Italy
- Coordinates: 43°32′8″N 10°42′4″E
- Country: Italy
- Region: Tuscany
- Province: Pisa (PI)
- Comune: Terricciola
- Elevation: 54 m (177 ft)

Population (2011)
  - Total: 395
- Time zone: UTC+1 (CET)
  - Summer (DST): UTC+2 (CEST)
- Postal code: 56030
- Dialing code: (+39) 0587

La Rosa is a village in Tuscany, central Italy, administratively a frazione of the comune of Terricciola, province of Pisa. At the time of the 2001 census its population was 258.

La Rosa is about 40 km from Pisa and 4 km from Terricciola.

== History ==
The hamlet developed around the historical estate "La Rosa", located on the left bank of the Era River. It also included a manor house and other rural buildings along the road connecting Volterra and Pontedera. In the 19th century, it became the property of the Marquises Torrigiani-Malaspina following a marriage between Cristina Malaspina and Filippo Torrigiani in 1850.

At the beginning of the 20th century, a strategic railway station was proposed, but the project was never realized.

Until after World War II, it remained a small rural community, with only 20 inhabitants in 1951. However, it soon experienced rapid growth in population, urban development, and the local economy. In 1972, Caciagli noted that many industrial companies were moving into the area.
