= Chientina =

- Frazione
- Location of Chientina in Italy
- Coordinates: 43°33′30″N 10°38′58″E
- Country: Italy
- Region: Tuscany
- Province: Pisa (PI)
- Comune: Terricciola
- Elevation: 117 m (384 ft)

Population (2011)
  - Total: 81
- Time zone: UTC+1 (CET)
  - Summer (DST): UTC+2 (CEST)
- Postal code: 56030
- Dialing code: (+39) 0587

Chientina is a village in Tuscany, central Italy, administratively a frazione of the comune of Terricciola, province of Pisa.

Chientina is about 32 km from Pisa and 5 km from Terricciola.

== Bibliography ==
- Caciagli, Giuseppe (1972). Pisa e la sua provincia. Vol. 2. Pisa: Colombo Cursi Editore.
