= Kurt Laurenz Metzler =

Swiss sculptor (1941–2024)

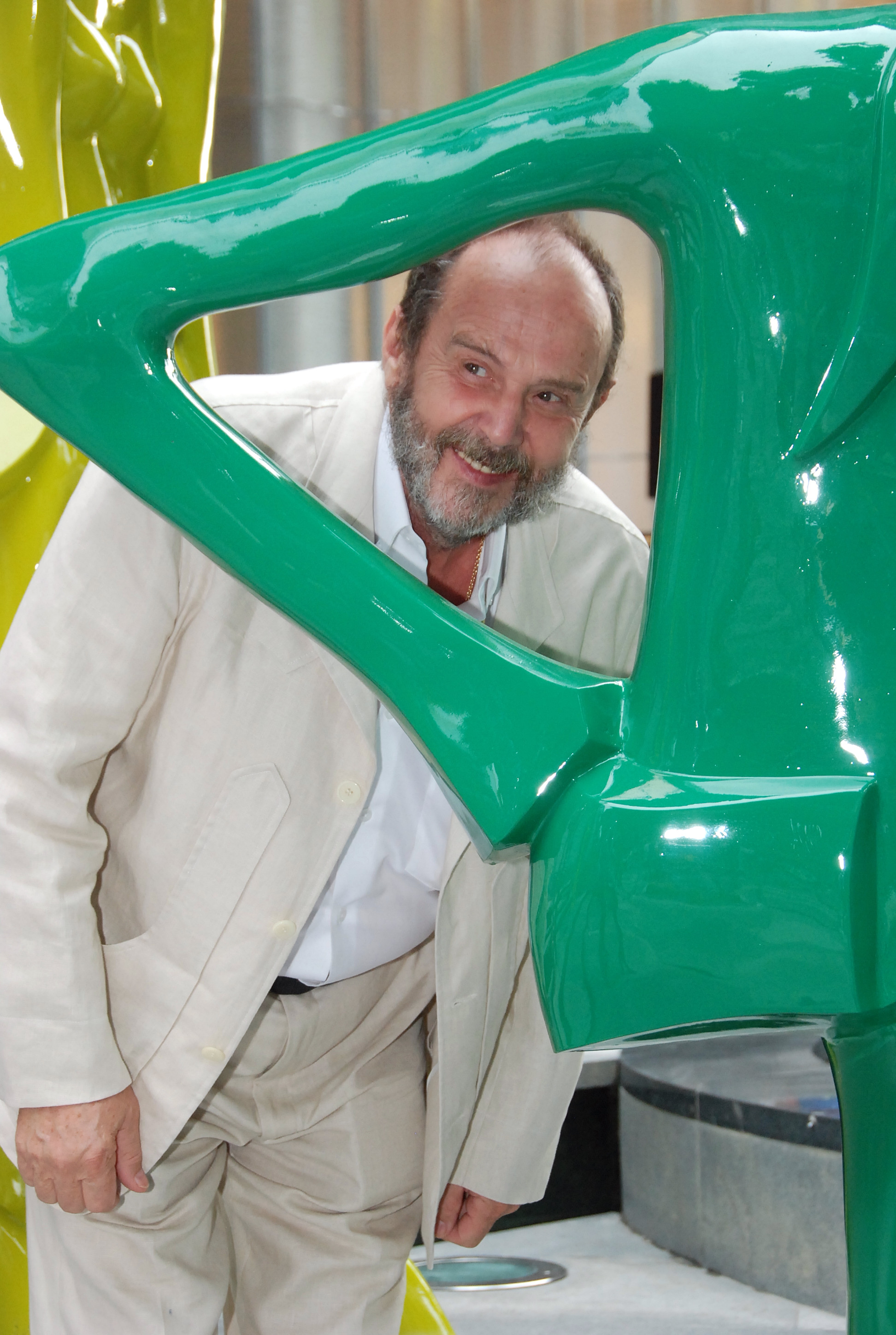
Kurt Laurenz Metzler

Kurt Laurenz Metzler (26 January 1941 – 20 December 2024), Signature "KLM", was a Swiss sculptor. His artworks adorned many Swiss cities, mostly in public places.

== Life and career ==
Metzler was born in 1941 in Balgach, St. Gallen. In School, Metzler already was working creatively, using pieces of wood and cardboard. He wanted to become an artist. Because he lost his father, he temporarily grew up at his uncle's, Florian Metzler, who was a painter.

Metzler's mother warned him that sculpture was an unstable business, so he decided to become an architectural draftsman, decorator, and photographer.

In 1958, he enrolled himself to the "Schule für Gestaltung“, an artistic school of Zurich. He got his sculptor's diploma in 1963. In 1964 he travelled to the United States and lived in New York City for a year.

Back in Switzerland, he began an apprenticeship at a car body tinsmith's to learn the art of blacksmithing. Then he worked for other sculptors, e.g. Ödön Koch, Arnold D'Altri, Paul Speck, and Silvio Mattioli.

In 1970, he bought a house in Tremona (Canton of Ticino, Switzerland). There, he created his first big sculptures. During this period, Metzler received his first orders and held multiple exhibitions.

Another voyage through the USA followed. In 1976, he took part at the “International Sculptors Congress“ in New Orleans.

In 1989 he opened up an atelier in Tillson, New York, where he created works for exhibitions in New York City and Long Island. He also went to Italy, where he started to live and work in Iesa near Siena, with Claudia, his wife, and his two sons. He lived in the Toscana and in Zurich.

The garden around his property is now populated with about 50 characters and draws comparisons with the garden of Daniel Spoerri and the Tarot Garden by Niki de Saint Phalle, an Artists' Garden in Tuscany, which became known as Arte Ambientale.

From this period, numerous monumental works of his can be seen in public spaces. The sculptures are located in Australia, Germany, and the United States.

In 1996 Metzler exhibited in the Baths of Caracalla in Rome, in 1997 in Sienna, and in 2003 in Milan. In 2006, a selection of his works were exhibited at the Park Hotel on the Bürgenstock were displayed at Lake Lucerne as well. In the same year he participated in the 3rd Swiss Sculpture Triennale in Bad Ragaz and Vaduz, for which he was the technical director, and where he also took part in the first two shows.

In 2007, several sculptural works in the context of the Ansbacher Metzler Sculpture Mile in the public space in Ansbach were visible.

From July to October he took part in the:"Bella Estate Dell'Arte of Milan", showing a traveling exhibition "Nevrotici Metropolitani" at the Milan Central Station square. The exhibition was curated by art critic Vittorio Sgarbi and praised by Milan mayor Letizia Moratti.

A book with many essays by Vittorio Sgarbi, Alberto Bartalini, and Franz Jaeger, with photo documentation by Mario Mulas brother of the late art photographer Ugo Mulas, about the "Nevrotici Metropolitani" traveling exhibition was published in 2008–2009.

For Christmas 2009 Metzler, collocated his touring exhibition "Nevrotici Metropolitani" into the "Piazza Basilica Inferiore" in Assisi.

In July 2009 in collaboration with Gallery Belvedere Singapore, he designed the sculpture group "Urban People" an eiconic public art installation in the heart of Orchard Road, in front of the ION Orchard and The Orchard Residences in Singapore.

End of summer he participated at the Concert For Viareggio as the only sculptor, with five of his works beneath the stage. The idea came from Zucchero "Sugar" Fornaciari, the headliner of the evening along with many other artists and celebrities from the worlds of sport and entertainment.

On occasion of the Teatro del Silenzio, the worldwide famous Andrea Bocelli concert, which took place on 25 July 2010, he created the stunning 14-metre monumental sculpture of a modernistic star as well as the metallic human figures in bright crayola colors that peopled the stone walls of the open-air theatre, and also graced the rooftops and piazza in Lajatic.

Metzler died on 20 December 2024, at the age of 83.

== Style ==
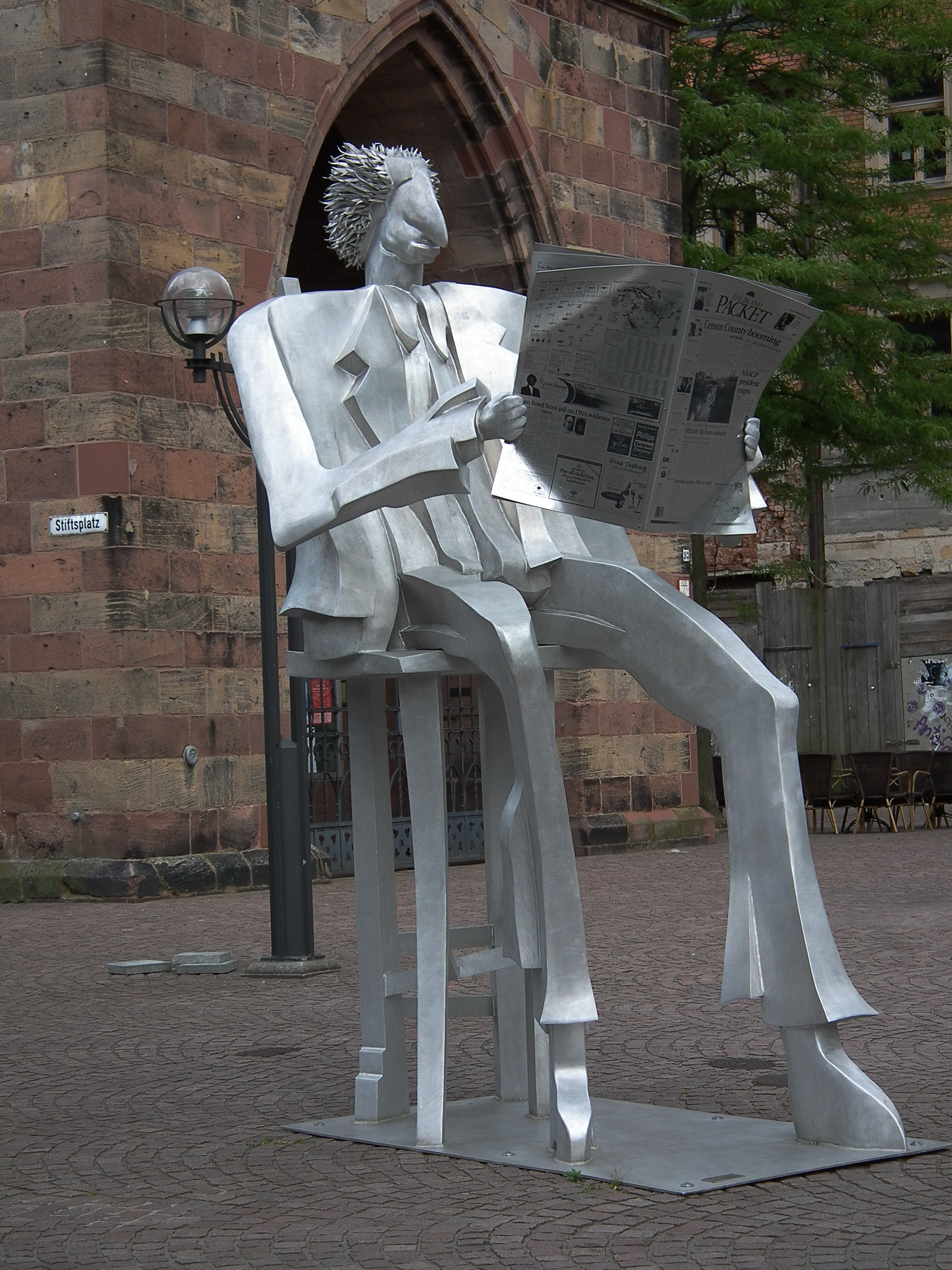
"Zeitungsleser"

His opinionated sculptures are made of materials that are heavy, but seem to be light when seen in the definitive work (Marble, Bronze, Iron, Aluminium). Sometimes, the materials are bare, but often they are painted unicolored with a rather violent color.

The elder motifs are wire dancers, people who are man and motor united (they e.g. contain motor parts or chains). Newer are the motifs Zeitungsleser (Newspaper), Stadtneurotiker (City-neurotics), Cities, Golf players or giant people.

== Select works ==
- «Gespräch», Ulmbergtunnel, Zürich, 1973
- «Stabhochspringer», Uster, 1974
- «Züri-Familie», Bahnhofstrasse, Zürich, 1978–79
- «Gespräch in Bewegung», Überlandstrasse, Zürich
- Figurengruppe aus Aluminium, Spreitenbach, 1993–94.
- Building People, Capital Tower, Singapore
- Urban People, ION Orchard, Singapore
- Men On Bench, Capital Tower Plaza, Singapore
