= La Sterza =

- Frazione
- Location of La Sterza in Italy
- Coordinates: 43°29′54″N 10°43′29″E
- Country: Italy
- Region: Tuscany
- Province: Pisa (PI)
- Comune: Lajatico; Terricciola
- Elevation: 74 m (243 ft)

Population (2011)
  - Total: 114
- Time zone: UTC+1 (CET)
  - Summer (DST): UTC+2 (CEST)
- Postal code: 56030
- Dialing code: (+39) 0587

La Sterza is a village in Tuscany, central Italy, administratively a frazione of the comuni of Lajatico and Terricciola, province of Pisa. At the time of the 2001 census its population was 91.

La Sterza is about 44 km from Pisa, 3 km from Lajatico and 6 km from Terricciola.

== Notable residents ==
- Andrea Bocelli, singer, born in La Sterza.
