= Teatro del Silenzio =

Italian open air amphitheater

Teatro del Silenzio (Theater of Silence)
- Poster
- Interactive map of Teatro del Silenzio (Theater of Silence)
- Address: Lajatico, Tuscany; Italy
- Coordinates: 43.468864°N 10.738519°E
- Capacity: 7,490, 10,000 in 2010

Construction
- Opened: 27 July 2006
- Architect: Realitalia

Website
- www.teatrodelsilenzio.it

The Teatro del Silenzio (English: Theater of Silence) is an open air amphitheater located in the city of Lajatico – the hometown of Andrea Bocelli – in the Tuscany region of Italy. In 2006, Bocelli convinced the municipality of Lajatico to build this outdoor venue whose structure utilizes the natural formations of the hilly landscape. Bocelli contributed greatly to its construction.

Bocelli, the honorary president of the theater, performs an annual concert there every July; the theater is silent for the rest of the year.

== People ==
Andrea Bocelli is honorary president of Teatro del Silenzio with Fabio Tedeschi, the mayor of Lajatico, president; and Enrico Fabbri, the boss of Fabbri, vice-president.

== Concerts ==
The Teatro del Silenzio annually hosts a concert in July. The concert includes performances by Andrea Bocelli and other guests. To date there have been 13 concerts from 2006 to 2018.

=== 2006 ===
The inaugural concert occurred 27 July 2006, and was performed in front of over five thousand people and included performances from the following.

- Andrea Bocelli (tenor)
- Paola Sanguinetti (soprano)
- Gianfranco Montresor (baritone)
- Pisana Chorus
- Orchestra Filarmonica Italiana di Piacenza (The Italian Philharmonic Orchestra)
- Marcello Rota (conductor)

Program
Song	Performer
A mio padre	Andrea Bocelli
Intermezzo (from Cavalleria rusticana)	Orchestra
Brindisi (from Cavalleria rusticana)	Andrea Bocelli
Duetto	Andrea Bocelli
O mio babbino caro	Paola Sanguinetti
E lucevan le stelle	Andrea Bocelli
Duetto (from La Boheme)	Andrea Bocelli; Paola Sanguinetti
Valzer Verdi
Di quella pira (from Il trovatore)	Orchestra; Danza
Terzetto (from Il trovatore)	Andrea Bocelli; Paola Sanguinetti, Gianfranco Montresor
Va, pensiero (from Nabucco)	Orchestra, Choir, Danza
Vieni sul mar	Andrea Bocelli
Granada	Andrea Bocelli
Sortia de Escamillo (from Carmen)	Gianfranco Montresor, chorus
Mamma	Andrea Bocelli
Voglio vivere così	Andrea Bocelli
Funiculì, Funiculà (Luigi Denza, Peppino Turco)	Andrea Bocelli, chorus
Sinfonia (from La gazza ladra)	Dance
Duetto 4° atto (from Andrea Chénier)	Andrea Bocelli
Nessun dorma (from Turandot)	Andrea Bocelli
Brindisi (from La Traviata); Because We Believe; Con te partirò	Andrea Bocelli

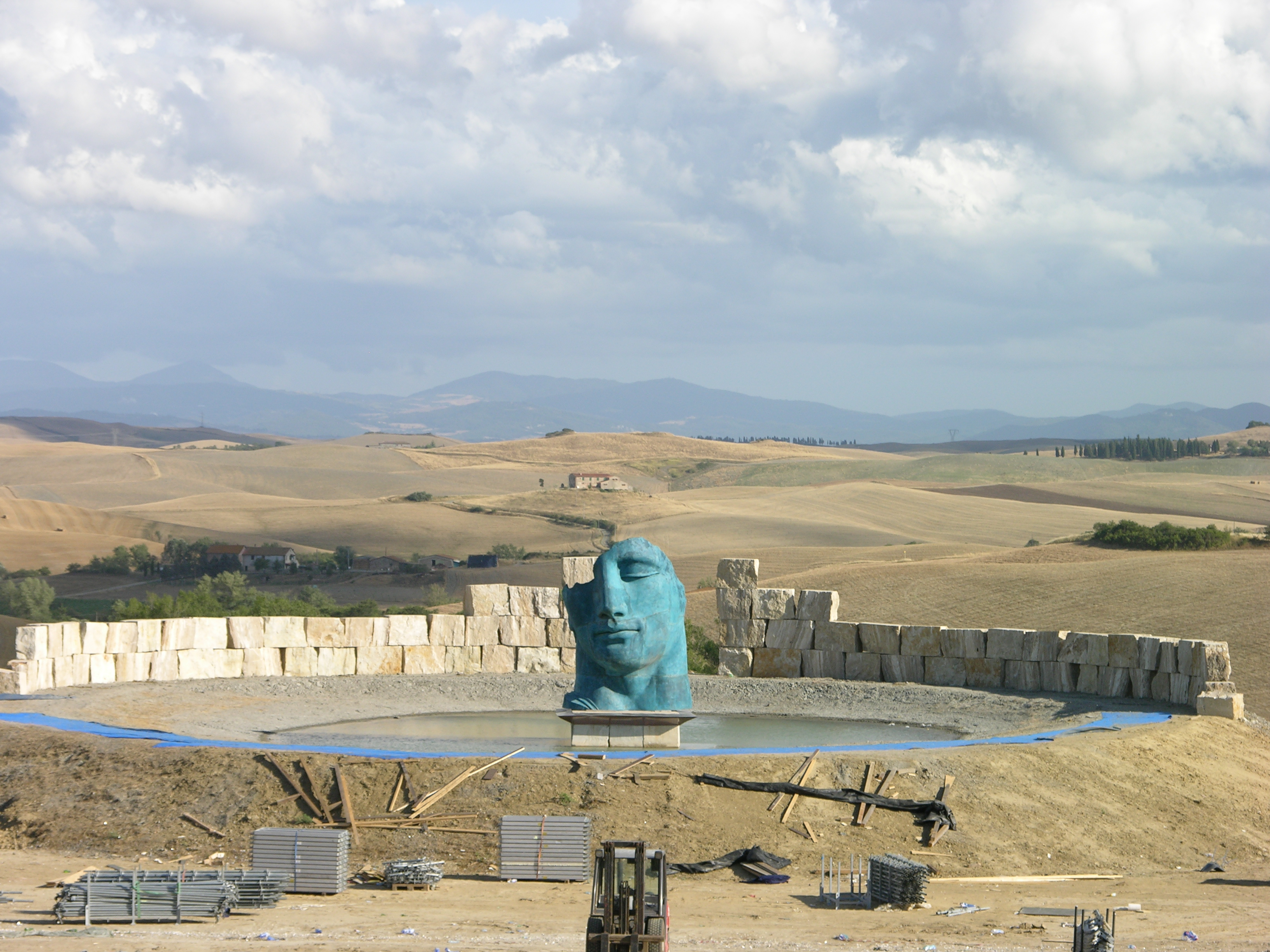
Teatro del Silenzio in 2007

=== 2007 ===
The second concert took place 5 July 2007. The planned rehearsal the previous night was cancelled due to heavy winds, but the concert itself went ahead and included performances from pianist Lang Lang, trumpeter Chris Botti, saxophonist Kenny G, singers Laura Pausini, Elisa, Sarah Brightman, and Heather Headley, conductor Bill Ross, the special guest was 14-time Grammy Award winning David Foster. Performances from Bocelli included Con te partirò, Vivo per lei, Il Mare Calmo della Sera, and The Prayer. Heather Headley was the other half of the duet in both Vivo per lei and The Prayer. Elisa performed La voce del silenzio, Laura Pausini sung Vivere, while Sarah Brightman performed Time to Say Goodbye as a duet with Bocelli and Canto della terra. Dueting with Bocelli on their respective instruments other performers included Lang Lang (Io ci sarò), Kenny G (A te), Chris Botti (Italia), and David Foster playing Because We Believe and a medley from Amore.

Vivere Live in Tuscany, the DVD of the concert was released January 29, 2008.

Program
Song	Performer
Mellodramma	Andrea Bocelli
A te	Andrea Bocelli; Kenny G
Vivere	Andrea Bocelli; Laura Pausini
Romaza	Andrea Bocelli
Io ci sarò	Andrea Bocelli, Lang Lang
Hungarian Rhapsody #2	Lang Lang
Mille Lune Mille Onde	Andrea Bocelli
La Voce del Silenzio	Andrea Bocelli
Canto del Terra	Andrea Bocelli; Sarah Brightman
Interval
Songbird	Kenny G
Bellissime Stelle	Andrea Bocelli; David Foster
Medley: Besame Mucho / Somos Novios / Can't Help Falling in Love	Andrea Bocelli; David Foster
Because we believe	Andrea Bocelli; David Foster
The Prayer	Andrea Bocelli; Heather Headley; David Foster
Somewhere Over the Rainbow	Heather Headley
Someone to Watch Over Me	Chris Botti
Italia	Andrea Bocelli; Chris Botti
Vivo per lei	Andrea Bocelli; Heather Headley
Sogno	Andrea Bocelli; David Foster
Il Mare Calmo della Sera	Andrea Bocelli
Time to Say Goodbye	Andrea Bocelli; Sarah Brightman

=== 2008 ===
Four One Music & Events organized the third concert on 20 July 2008.

- Orchestra Roma Sinfonietta (The Rome Sinfonietta Orchestra)
- Sinfonietta Orchestra of Rome
- Nicola Piovani
- Roberto Bolle
- Noa
- Jake Zyrus

Zyrus sang a duet of the song "The Prayer" with Bocelli, having only met for the first time 23 May 2008 when performing at a one-night tribute concert with David Foster at the Mandalay Bay Events Center on the Las Vegas Strip.

Program
Song	Performer
Petite Mort	Roberto Bolle; Shirley Esseboom
Voglio vivere così	Andrea Bocelli; Carlo Bernini
O surdato 'nnammurato	Andrea Bocelli; Carlo Bernini
La notte di San Lorenzo	Nicola Piovani
Torna a Surriento	Andrea Bocelli; Carlo Bernini
Santa Lucia	Andrea Bocelli; Carlo Bernini; Kristian Cellini
Yuma	Noa
Non ti scordar di me	Andrea Bocelli; Carlo Bernini
Mamma	Andrea Bocelli; Carlo Bernini
Funiculì, Funiculà	Andrea Bocelli; Carlo Bernini
Interval
L'Arlésienne	Andrea Bocelli; Sabrina Brazzo

=== 2009 ===
For 2009, eight sculptures, by Hans Peter Ditzler, were placed in the theater. The concert took place on July 18. Among Bocelli's guests were Plácido Domingo, with whom he sang "Nessun dorma" from Puccini's Turandot and a duet from The Pearl Fishers, and Katherine Jenkins, with whom he sang "Time to Say Goodbye".

=== 2010 ===
Sculptures by Swiss artist Kurt Laurenz Metzler, who attended the concert, were exhibited during the 2010 edition of the concert, and Italian actress Gina Lollobrigida, who was also in attendance, donated a Bronze statue she had made of Bocelli, to the city of Lajatico, in the afternoon just before the concert.

Bocelli held the fifth edition of the Teatro del Silenzio, on July 25, to an audience of 10,000, double the amount of the first edition of the annual Festival, held in 2006. His guests included one of the two surviving member of The Three Tenors, Spanish Catalan tenor, José Carreras, and Italian rock singer, Zucchero.

He was also awarded the Pisano Doc, during the dress rehearsal for the concert, July 24, "in recognition for a great citizen, who with his extraordinary art and his humanity brings great prestige, honor and respect to the city of Pisa."

=== 2012 ===
The edition was held on July 12, 2012.

=== 2013 ===
The 2013 edition of the annual concert was held on July 13, 2013. Numbers included a cover of "Love Me Tender" initially performed by Elvis Presley and Italian renditions of Frank Sinatra's "My Way" and Edith Piaf's "La Vie en Rose". Guests included tenor Riccardo Cocciante. As is tradition, Andrea Bocelli performed "Time to Say Goodbye" at the end of the concert.

=== 2015 ===
The 2015 edition of the concert was the first time that a full opera was performed, the Turandot by Giacomo Puccini. Bocelli played the role of Calaf.

=== 2016 ===
The 2016 edition of the concert themed 'Le Cirque' was held on July 30, 2016 with a dress rehearsal open to the public on July 29, 2016. The performance mostly consisted of selections from some of the most well known operas with a few 'pop' numbers in the mix. Andrea Bocelli was joined by the legendary South Korean lyrical soprano, Sumi Jo as well as Leo Nucci, Gianfranco Montesor, Svetla Vassileva, Tiziana Carraro, Frederico Longhi, Giuseppe Raimondo, Carmelo Corrado Caruso, Paulo Pecchioli, and I Cantori di Burlamacco. The program was as follows:

Part 1

- 'La Strada' di N. Rota (Orchestra el Teatro 'Carlo Felice' di Genova)
- 'Pagliacci' di R. Leoncavallo – Prologo e Vesti la Giubba (Leo Nucci & Andrea Bocelli
- 'Rigoletto' di G. Verdi – Caro Nome, Piangi Fanciulla, e La Donna e Mobile (Sumi Jo, Leo Nucci e Andrea Bocelli
- 'Lucia di Lammermoor' di G. Donizetti – Verranno a te sull'aure (A. Bocelli e Sumi Jo)
- 'Carmen' di G Bizet – Les voici (Coro del Teatro Carlo Felice di enova e i Cantori di Burlamacco)
- 'Aida' di Verdi – Gran Finale Atto 2 (Ensemble)

Part 2

- 'Danza delle Spade' di A. Khachaturian (Orchestra)
- 'La Frza Del Destino' di Verdi – Invano Alvaro (A. Boceli e Leo Nucci)
- 'Sunrise' di G. Allevi (G. Allevi e Orchestra)
- 'La Danza' di G. Rossini (A.Bocelli e G Alllevi)
- 'Andrea Chenier' di U. Giordano – Si, Fui Soldato e Vicino a te S'aqueta (A. Bocellu e Svetla Vassileva)
- 'Marcia dei Gladiatori' de J. Fucik (Orchestra)
- Il trovatore' Verdi – L'onda de' suoni mistici/Di quella pira (Bocelli, Vassileva, e Matteo Bocelli
- 'Un Ballo in Maschera' Verdi – Eri tu che macchiavi e Su, profetessa... (L. Nucci, A. Bocelli)
- 'La Boheme' Puccini – Atto 2 (Ensemble)
- 'Nelle tue Mani' (A. Bocelli)

=== 2017 ===
The 2017 version of the concert was performed on August 3 and was titled 'Il canto della Terra' (the song of the Earth). Performances ranged from artists coming from Argentina, Haiti, Armenia, Spain and many others. World renown dancer Carla Fracci also joined the stage, as well as Andrea Bocelli Foundation's Haitian choir 'Voices of Haiti'

=== 2018 ===
The 2018 edition was performed twice, on July 28 and July 30, and was once again an opera, this time the Andrea Chénier by Umberto Giordano, the first opera that Bocelli ever learned.

=== 2019 ===
The 2019 edition, titled Ali di Libertà, took place on July 25 and July 27, under the artistic direction of Luca Tommassini, the renowned choreographer and creative director known for his visually stunning productions. Special guests included Mika and Matteo Bocelli, who performed the touching duet Fall On Me together with Andrea Bocelli.

=== 2024 ===
In July 2024, the Teatro del Silenzio was the venue for the three-day concert event, Andrea Bocelli 30: The Celebration. Bocelli performed with musical guests including Placido Domingo, Laura Pausini, Tiziano Ferro, Elisa, and Zucchero. The concert was filmed for release as a theatrical film and a television special.

== Features ==
The site of Teatro del Silenzio also incorporates sculptures by renowned artists. Sculptures have been selected to be exhibited on a platform in the center of the lake. In 2008, Mario Ceroli's "Il Cavallo di Bronzo", a bronze horse was displayed with past sculptures including Arnaldo Pomodoro's "Il Grande Sole", and works by Igor Mitoraj and Kurt Laurenz Metzler.

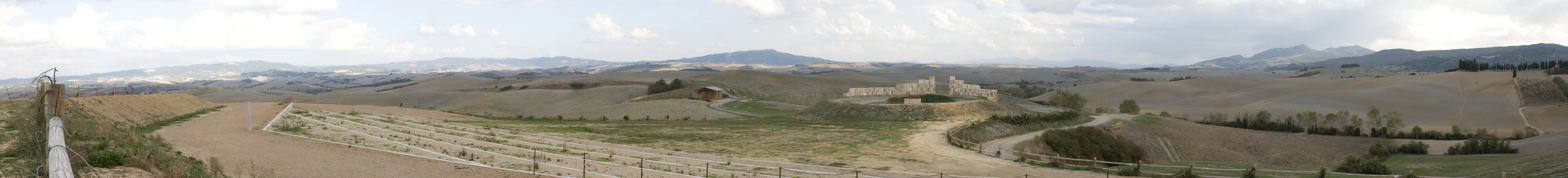
A panoramic view of the theater and the surrounding landscape.

== See also ==
- Andrea Bocelli
- Vivere Live in Tuscany
