= Lajatico =

- Comune
- Comune di Lajatico
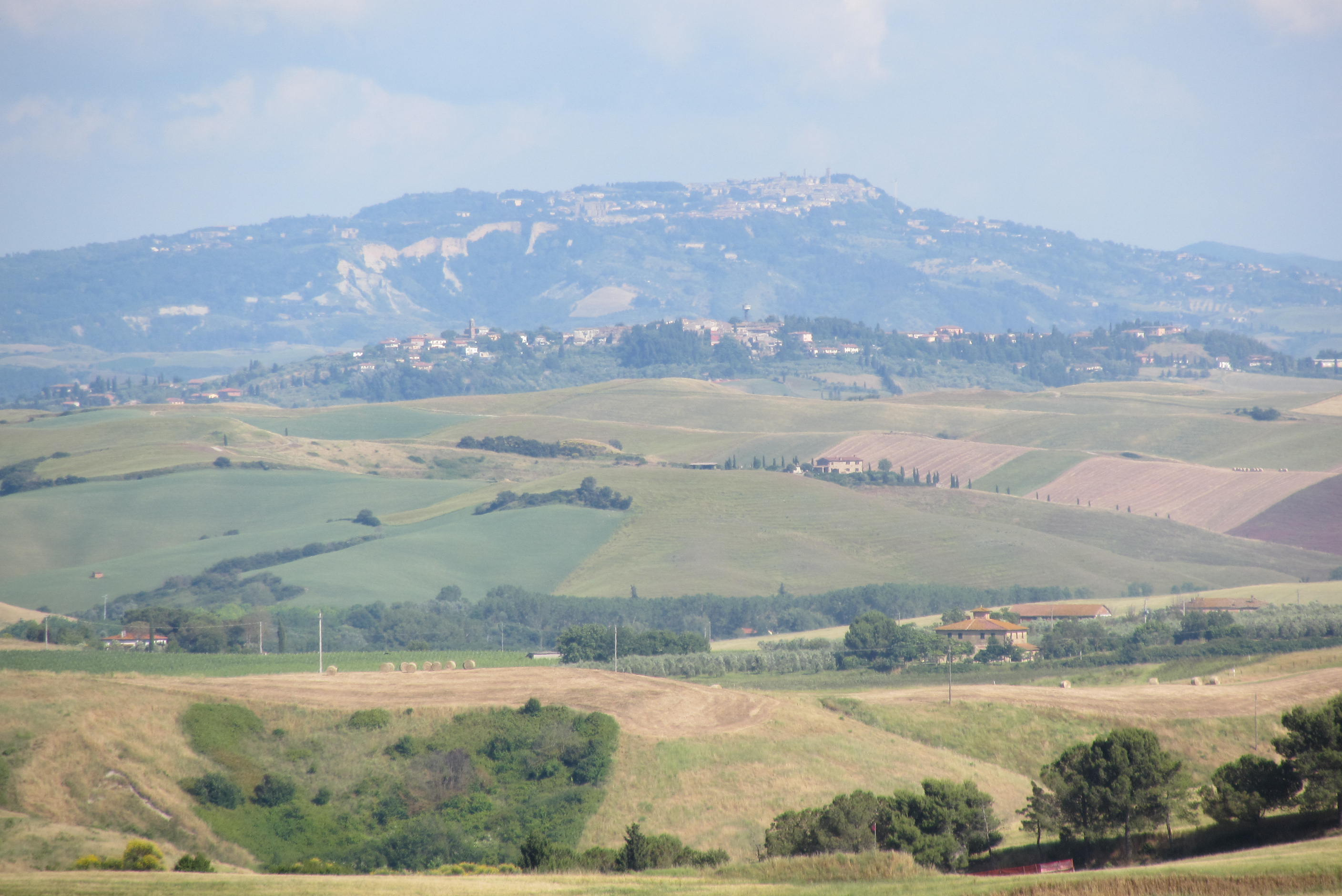

- Coat of arms

- Location within Italy Location within Tuscany
- Coordinates: 43°28′20″N 10°43′46″E
- Country: Italy
- Region: Tuscany
- Province: Pisa (PI)
- Frazioni: Orciatico, La Sterza, San Giovanni di Val d'Era

Government
  - Mayor: Alessio Barbafieri

Area
  - Total: 72.66 km^{2} (28.05 sq mi)
- Elevation: 205 m (673 ft)

Population (31 August 2017)
  - Total: 1,312
  - Density: 18.06/km^{2} (46.77/sq mi)
- Demonym: Laiatichesi or Latiatichini
- Time zone: UTC+1 (CET)
  - Summer (DST): UTC+2 (CEST)
- Postal code: 56030
- Dialing code: 0587
- Patron saint: St. Leonard of Noblac
- Saint day: 6 November
- Website: Official website

Lajatico is a comune (municipality) in the Province of Pisa in the Italian region Tuscany, located about 50 kilometers (31 mi) southwest of Florence and about 40 kilometers (25 mi) southeast of Pisa. Lajatico sits in mainly hilly terrain at variable elevations from 100 to 650 meters (330 to 2,130 ft) above sea level) and dominates both the end of the Valdera valley and the opening of the valley known as Val di Cecina.

La Sterza, one of its hamlets (frazioni), is the natural door between these two geographical areas. The Sterza, Era, and the Ragone rivers form natural borders, placing Lajatico in a very central position to reach Tuscan cities and seaside resorts. Lajatico is, however, best known as the home town of tenor Andrea Bocelli. His annual concerts at the Teatro del Silenzio are attended by people from all around the world, every year.

Lajatico has the following hamlets (frazioni) associated with it: Orciatico, an ancient small medieval village; San Giovanni di Val d'Era; and La Sterza. Another small locality is Spedaletto, a stomping ground of Lorenzo de' Medici. Lajatico borders the following municipalities: Chianni, Montecatini Val di Cecina, Peccioli, Riparbella, Terricciola, Volterra.

== History ==
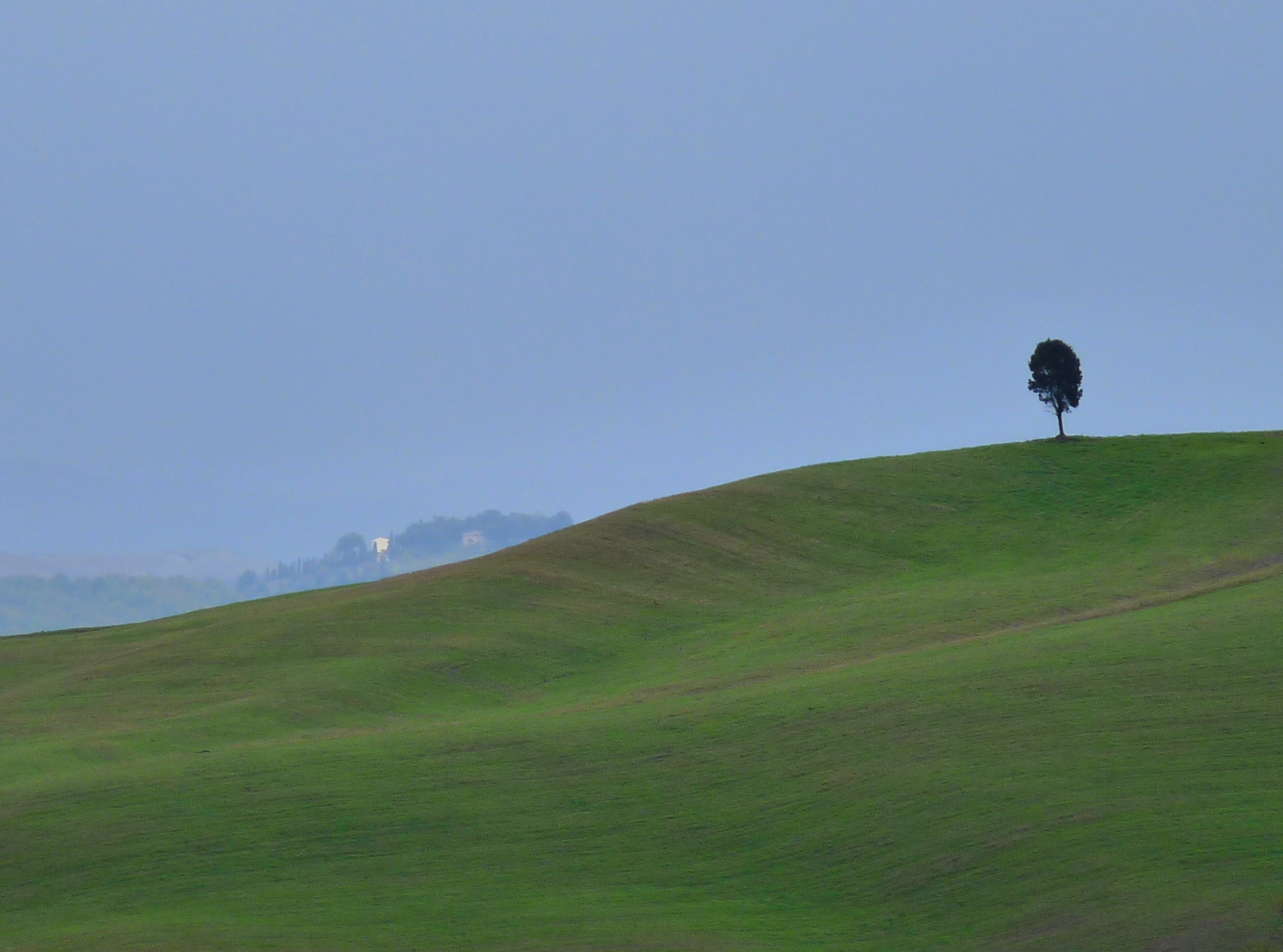
Rolling farmland outside Lajatico

Lajatico, as the suffix “atico” indicates, is of Lombard origins (c. 7th century AD), but the first settlements are much more ancient. Archaeological evidence suggests (a funeral stone, some urns, terracotta vases, etc.) that the village is Etruscan in origin.

The first written document mentioning Lajatico dates from 891. From then on, the Castrum Ajatici was property of the powerful Pannocchieschi family of Elci. In 1139, Ranieri Pannocchieschi gave to the Bishop of Volterra, Adimaro Adimari, his property stretching to Lajatico and neighboring areas. In 1161, another part of Lajatico was given to the Bishop of Volterra, until Bishop Ildebrando Pannocchieschi, due to a Papal Bull of August 1186, took over the political jurisdiction.

In 1202, Lajatico and part of Volterra came under the influence of Pisa until 1284, when Pisa was defeated by Genova in the Battle of Meloria. At the end of the hostilities, Lajatico came back to the Bishop of Volterra, who brought it, together with Orciatico, Pietracassia and other castles, under the jurisdiction of the city of Florence, which held it until the peace of Fucecchio, in 1293. Aside from 1362, when Florence occupied Lajatico for a short time, and kept it under the jurisdiction of Pisa until 1406, when Pietro Gaetani, a Pisan noble who decided to sell out his native land, and gave the castles of Lajatico, Orciatico and Pietracassia to the Florentines. In 1434, the Florentines demolished not only the walls of the town, but also the wall and towers of the surrounding villages, to punish their inhabitants for their submission to Niccolò Piccinino, condottiero under the Visconti of Milan. In 1664, the same castles with their territories were ceded as a marquisate to the Corsini until 1776, when Lajatico annexed the municipality of Orciatico. In 1869, it also annexed part of the territories belonging to the municipalities of Montecatini and Volterra.

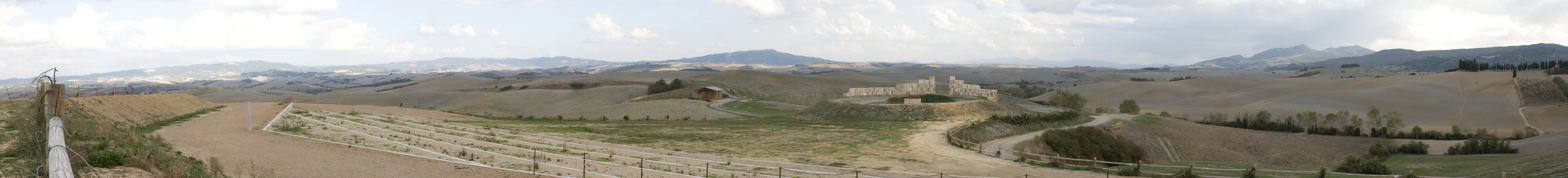
Countryside outside of Lajatico

== Main sights ==
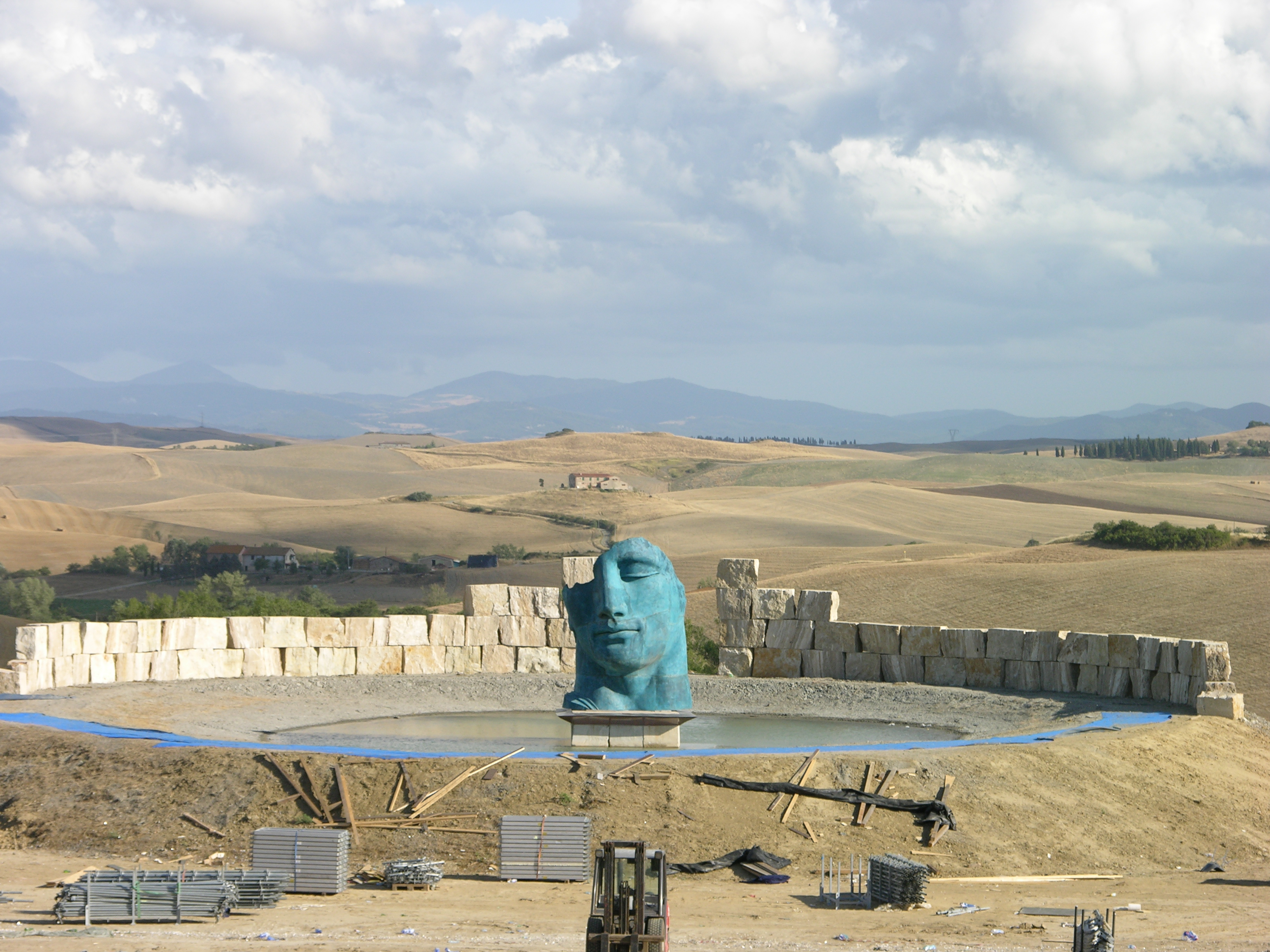
Andrea Bocelli's Teatro del Silenzio

- The parish church of St. Leonard was built in 1275. It was too small to contain an ever-increasing number of believers; thus, in the second half of the 19th century it was enlarged by adding two aisles and, in 1925, a new façade. Still in the 19th century it was completely restructured by Angelo della Valle, from Livorno. Work started in July 1853 and the Church was opened Christmas Day in 1856. The present form is of neoclassical with a nave and two aisles and a semicircular apse. The columns supporting the vaults of the naves are cylindrical in shape with Ionic capitals. Inside, the Church the nave ends with a barrel vault. The high altar, destroyed by war, was completely restructured in 1957. The frescos on the central vault, representing Jesus Christ and Our Lady of the Assumption, have been painted by the Sienese Gualtiero Anichini between 1949 and 1950. In 1952 Professor Marini painted San Giuseppe. In 1965 the pipe organ was restored (with over 849 pipes). Moreover, on the entrance wall there is a plaque saying that on 26 August 1857, Pope Pius IX went past these places. Beside it, another memento reminds visitors the moment in which his body came back and stopped in the church of Lajatico. In 1300, Pope Urban VI, when traveling from Genova to Perugia spent a night in Lajatico with his court.
- Close to the Church of St. Leonard is the ancient Oratory of St. Sebastian. It was built in 1520 by a brotherhood or parishioners to pray and carry out other charitable acts. Some years later a “hospital for poor people” was built which served people until 1585. Since 1946 it is known as the Chapel for the Fallen. In 2001 its façade was decorated by Paolo Maiani with his fresco entitled “Recupero di memoria,” representing the triumph of the Resurrection.
- The Sala Polivalente (Multi-purpose hall), located near the Oratory of St. Sebastian, included in the remains of a noble chapel. In 2002 it was taken over by the Municipality and, after a thorough restoration, it was put at the citizens disposal as a multi-purpose hall. It houses also a small Etruscan museum made of finds coming from Lajatico (a funeral urn, some amphorae, and a big funeral stone).
- Belltower and clock, likely belonging to the ancient castle of Lajatico. In 1790, the Gottis, owners of the castle at that time, installed a public clock on it. In 1791, after having done some repairs to the walls, the magistracy of Lajatico decided to buy a clock for the tower with bell included at a price of 80 ecus. The works were commissioned to Donato Rosi from Volterra. Other work was done on the tower in 1860. In 1999 the obsolete and disused clock mechanisms were removed, repaired and exhibited in the town hall.
- The castle, in the center of the town, dates back to the before the 11th century (Castrum Ajatici). Nowadays, only the side facing the main square remains. The façade has a stone coat of arms representing the symbol of Pisa as Maritime Republic. High, on the left, a stone lion holding a shield carved with Florence's lily. On top of the entrance door there is a double lancet window surrounded by six coats of arms; five of them cannot be recognized, but the remaining one, placed above the window, represents an eagle, probably the Gaetani's coat of arms. In the small entrance, three stone carved scenes relevant to the battle between the Pisa Republic and Florence. Pietro Gaetani sold the castle to the Florentines in 1405 and, in 1434, and they pulled down its tower and wall as a punitive action. On the right side of the building there is the bell tower. From there, an excavation reveals the Gotti Lega's palace.
- Town hall, once used as a prison. It came down after many changes of use: from Lajatico government seat to civil house in the 19th century. On the building, constructed in the 12th century, are still visible the coats of arms of the various lords of Lajatico.
- Villa di Spedaletto
- The Springs (The Fonti) were the most important water supply for the castle in Lajatico. Due to their large discharge, in 1783, Gonfalonier Ottavio Gotti decided to enlarge them making a trough for animals and some baths to be used as public washtubs. Originally, they were equipped with wood-roofing and curved tiles that, later were destroyed.
- The Municipal Theater was created in the latter half of the 19th century by the Società per l’educazione del Popolo. It is a simple oblong structure with a wooden stand and a 7-meter (23 ft) deep stage. In World War II, all its activities were stopped to use it as warehouse. In 1958–60, after having been partially restored, it became a cinema. The Municipality bought it in 1996 and restored it completely, embellishing it with very particular trims and decorations.
- Teatro del Silenzio (Theater of Silence) is a natural theater framed in the hills of Lajatico. Andrea Bocelli, its honorary president, performs at the theater in July of every year; the rest of the year, it remains silent. A small lake is surrounded by travertine blocks. In its center are works of artists such as Igor Mitorai and Arnaldo Pomodoro.

== Notable people ==
- Andrea Bocelli, singer, was born and raised here.
- Evelyn Mayr, tennis player
- Julia Mayr, tennis player
