= San Giovanni di Val d'Era =

- Frazione
- Location of San Giovanni di Val d'Era in Italy
- Coordinates: 43°27′32″N 10°45′26″E
- Country: Italy
- Region: Tuscany
- Province: Pisa (PI)
- Comune: Lajatico
- Elevation: 91 m (299 ft)

Population (2011)
  - Total: 104
- Time zone: UTC+1 (CET)
  - Summer (DST): UTC+2 (CEST)
- Postal code: 56030
- Dialing code: (+39) 0587

San Giovanni di Val d'Era (or Villaggio San Giovanni), known also as Borgo Bocioni, is a village in Tuscany, central Italy, administratively a frazione of the comune of Lajatico, province of Pisa. At the time of the 2001 census its population was 93.

San Giovanni is about 50 km from Pisa and 4 km from Lajatico.
