= Chianni =

- Comune
- Comune di Chianni
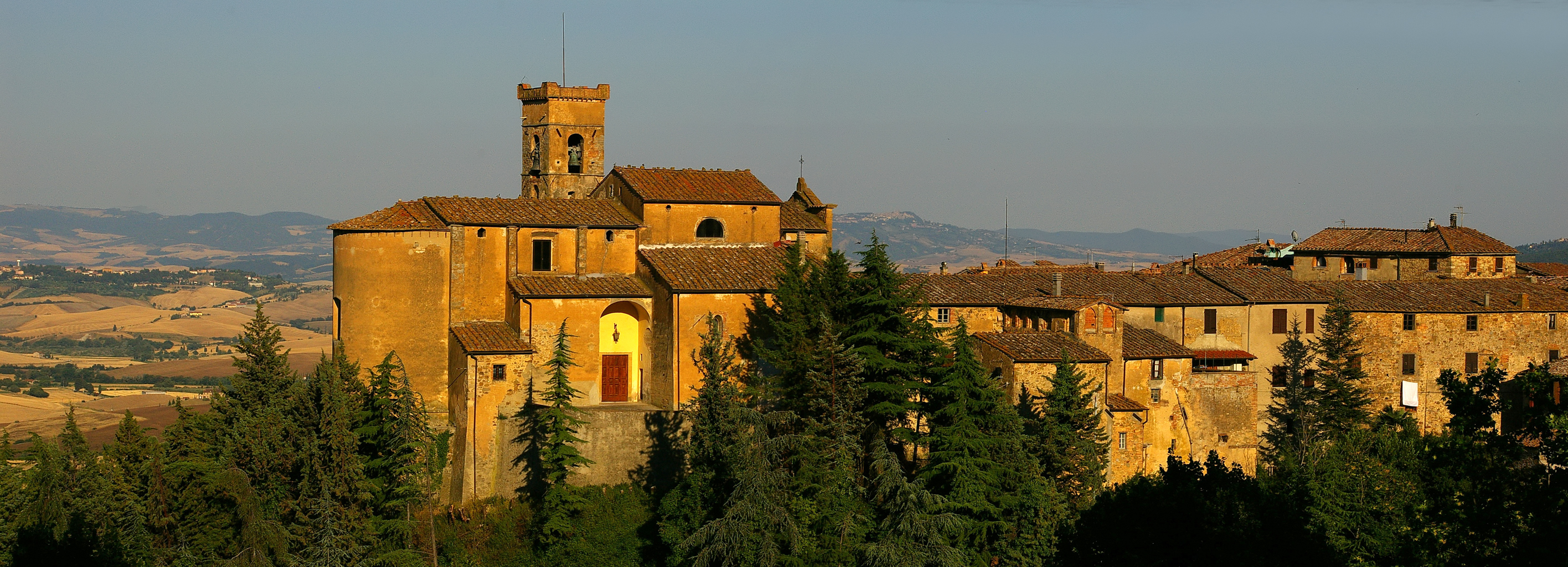

- Coat of arms

- Location within Italy Location within Tuscany
- Coordinates: 43°29′N 10°39′E
- Country: Italy
- Region: Tuscany
- Province: Pisa (PI)
- Frazioni: Rivalto

Government
  - Mayor: Giacomo Tarrini

Area
  - Total: 61.99 km^{2} (23.93 sq mi)
- Elevation: 284 m (932 ft)

Population (30 June 2017)
  - Total: 1,354
  - Density: 21.84/km^{2} (56.57/sq mi)
- Demonym: Chiannerini
- Time zone: UTC+1 (CET)
  - Summer (DST): UTC+2 (CEST)
- Postal code: 56030
- Dialing code: 0587
- Website: Official website

Chianni is a comune (municipality) in the Province of Pisa in the Italian region Tuscany, located about 60 kilometres (37 mi) southwest of Florence and about 35 kilometres (22 mi) southeast of Pisa.

Its territory includes vast chestnut woods and cultivations of vine and olive trees.

Chianni borders the following municipalities: Casciana Terme Lari, Castellina Marittima, Lajatico, Riparbella, Santa Luce, Terricciola.

== History ==
Before being under the rule of Florence, the medieval town of Chianni was fought over by the bishop of Volterra and the Republic of Pisa. One of the largest attractions is the Chapel della Compagnia della Santissima Annuziata, hosting frescoes by Giovanni Battista Tempesti. The parish church of San Donato was rebuilt in 1810 after an earthquake; an 1896 survey notes altarpieces by Aurelio Lomi depicting a Madonna and a Nativity.
