= Terricciola =

- Comune
- Comune di Terricciola
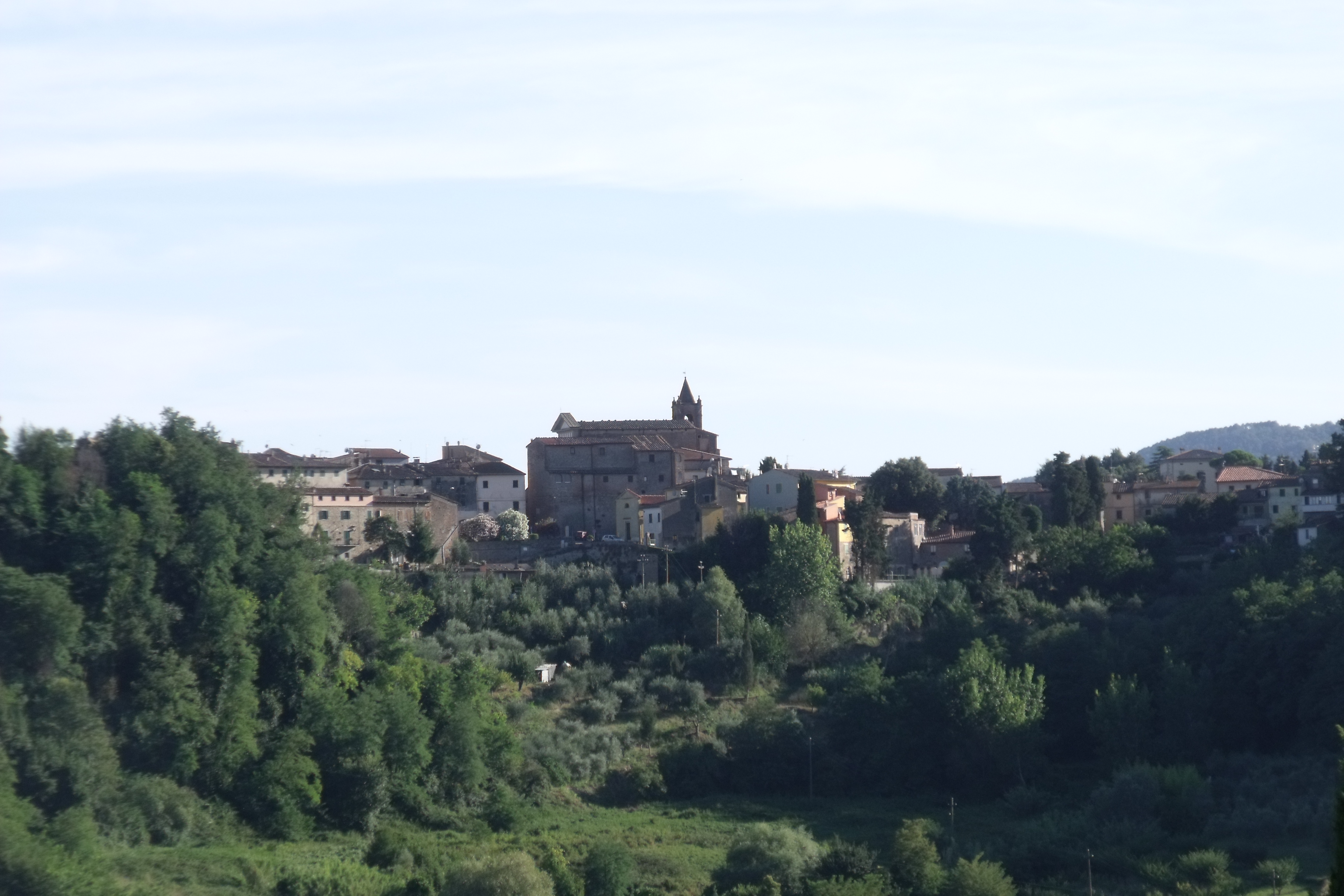
- Panorama of Terricciola

- Location within Italy Location within Tuscany
- Coordinates: 43°31′N 10°40′E
- Country: Italy
- Region: Tuscany
- Province: Pisa (PI)
- Frazioni: Chientina, La Rosa, La Sterza, Morrona, Selvatelle, Soiana, Soianella

Government
  - Mayor: Maria Antonietta Fais

Area
  - Total: 43.28 km^{2} (16.71 sq mi)
- Elevation: 180 m (590 ft)

Population (31 December 2016)
  - Total: 4,522
  - Density: 104.5/km^{2} (270.6/sq mi)
- Time zone: UTC+1 (CET)
  - Summer (DST): UTC+2 (CEST)
- Postal code: 56030
- Dialing code: 0587
- Website: Official website

Terricciola is a comune (municipality) in the Province of Pisa in the Italian region Tuscany, located about 50 kilometres (31 mi) southwest of Florence and about 30 kilometres (19 mi) southeast of Pisa.

Terricciola borders the following municipalities: Capannoli, Casciana Terme Lari, Chianni, Lajatico, Peccioli.
