= Rivalto =

- Frazione
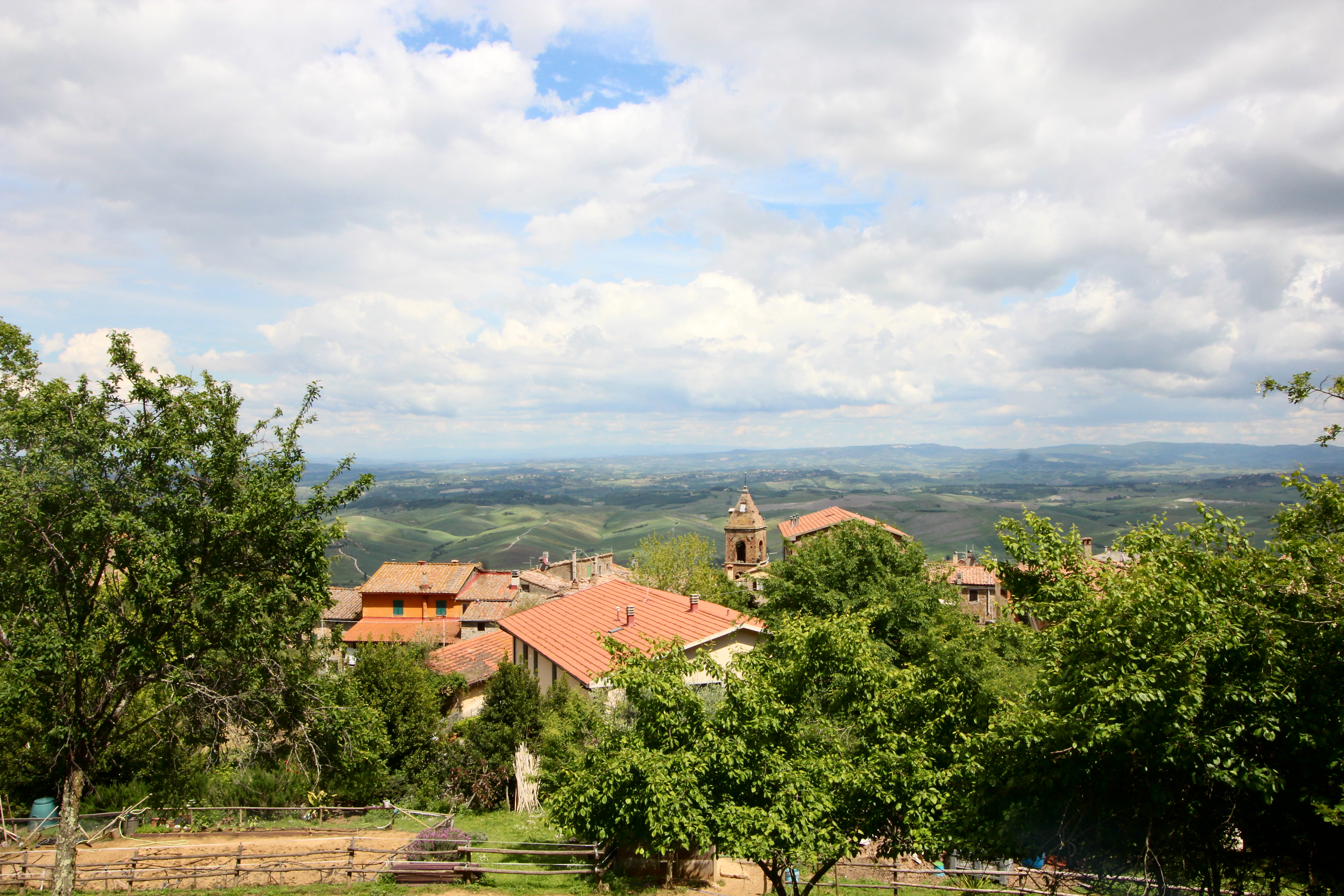

- Location of Rivalto in Italy
- Coordinates: 43°29′41″N 10°38′13″E
- Country: Italy
- Region: Tuscany
- Province: Pisa (PI)
- Comune: Chianni
- Elevation: 349 m (1,145 ft)

Population (2011)
  - Total: 96
- Time zone: UTC+1 (CET)
  - Summer (DST): UTC+2 (CEST)
- Postal code: 56030
- Dialing code: (+39) 0587

Rivalto is a village in Tuscany, central Italy, administratively a frazione of the comune of Chianni, province of Pisa. At the time of the 2001 census its population was 96.

Rivalto is about 45 km from Pisa and 3 km from Chianni.

== Images ==
Churches of Rivalto

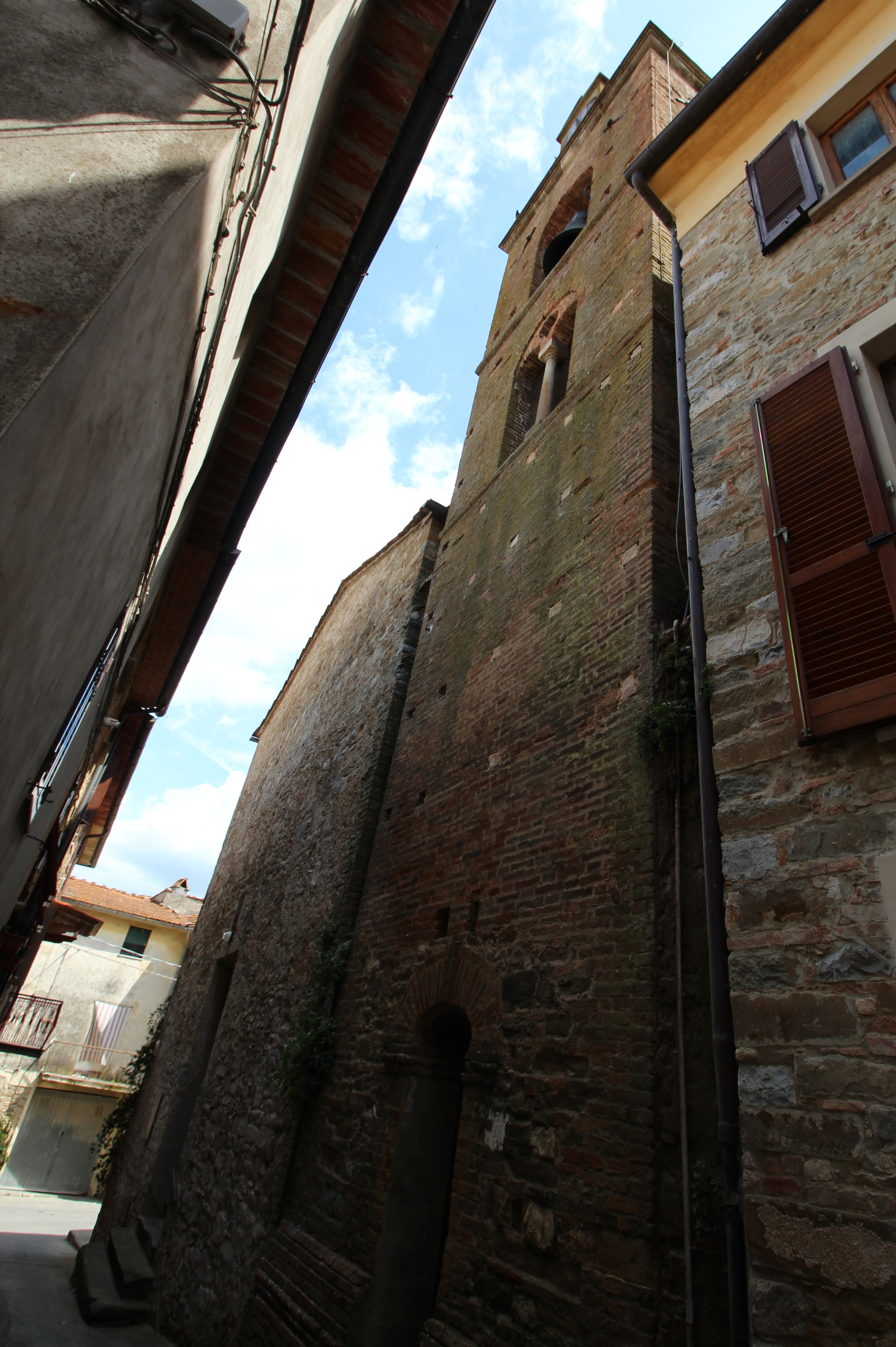
Santi Fabiano e Sebastiano

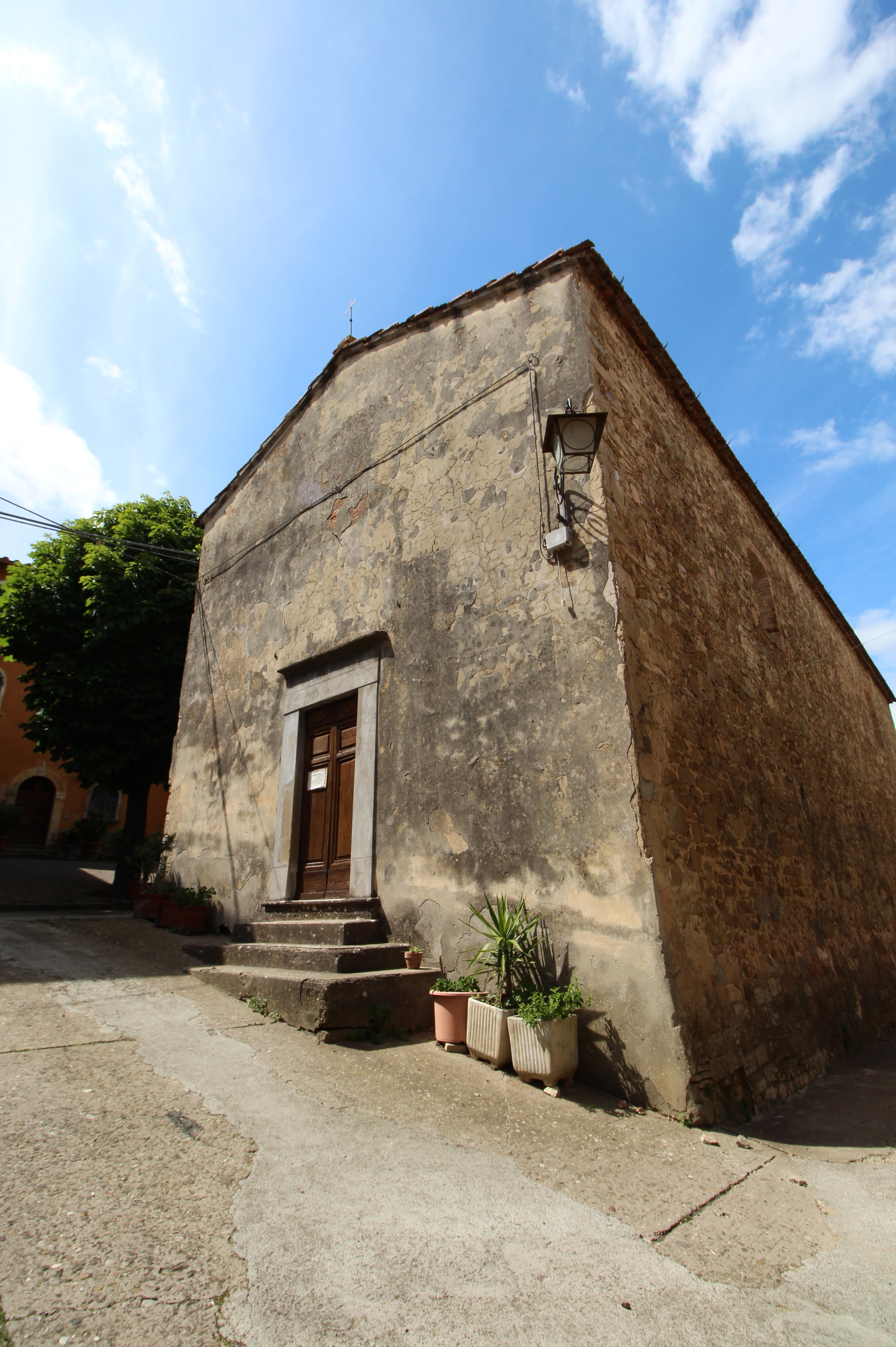
Santa Croce

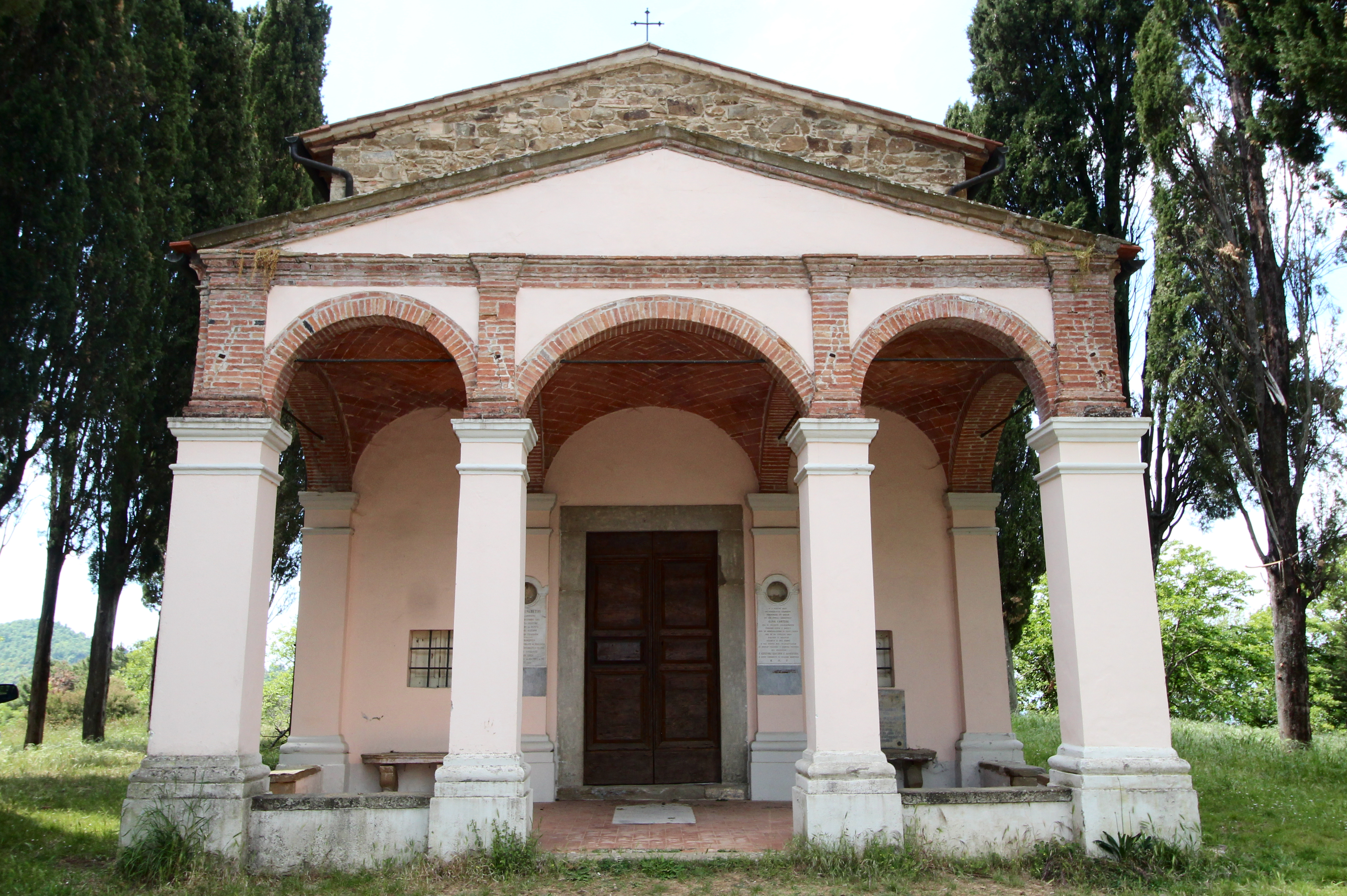
Madonna del Carmine
