= Soiana =

- Frazione
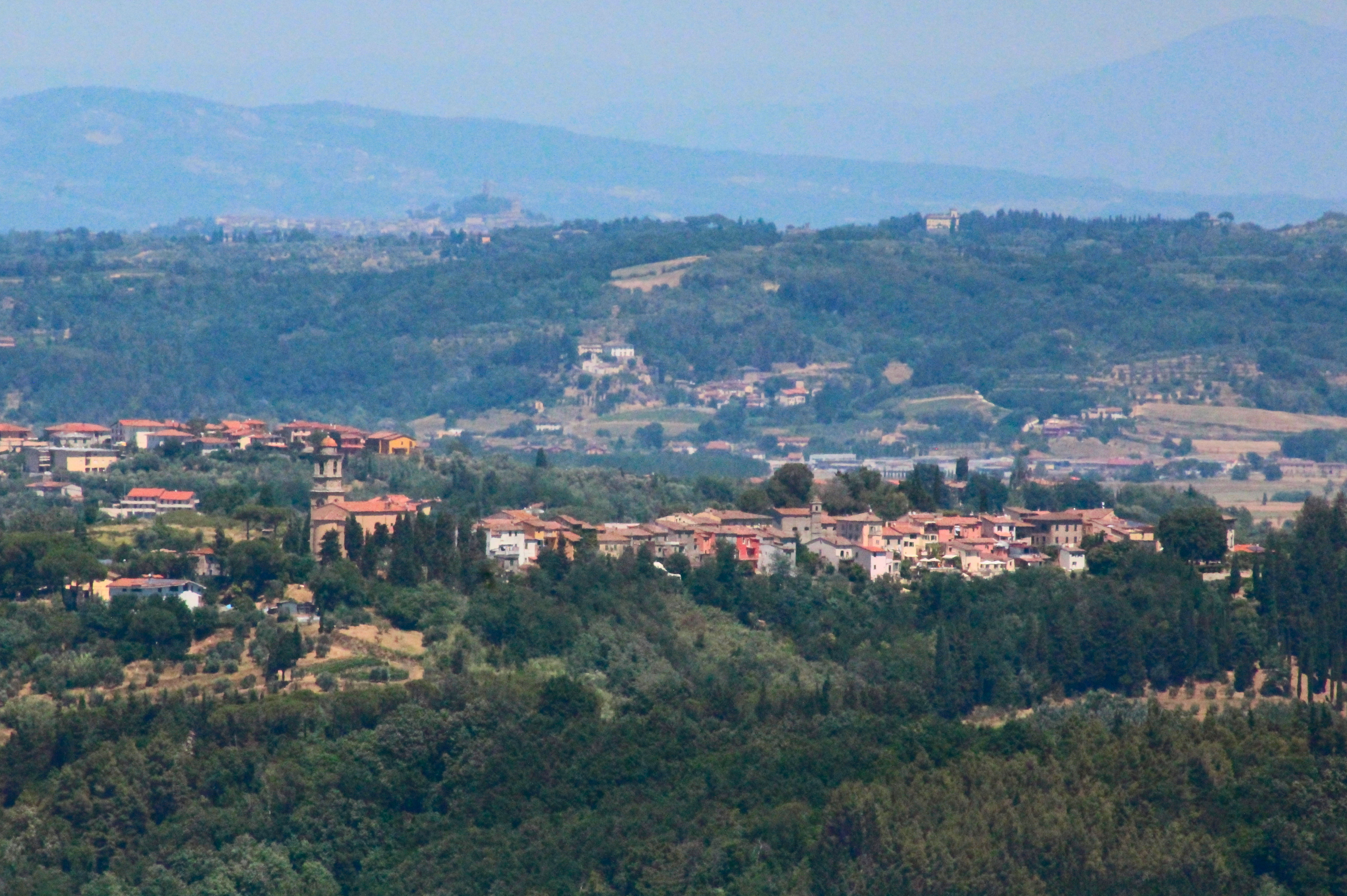

- Location of Soiana in Italy
- Coordinates: 43°33′7″N 10°38′51″E
- Country: Italy
- Region: Tuscany
- Province: Pisa (PI)
- Comune: Terricciola
- Elevation: 146 m (479 ft)

Population (2011)
  - Total: 317
- Demonym: Soianesi
- Time zone: UTC+1 (CET)
  - Summer (DST): UTC+2 (CEST)
- Postal code: 56030
- Dialing code: (+39) 0587

Soiana is a village in Tuscany, central Italy, administratively a frazione of the comune of Terricciola, province of Pisa. At the time of the 2001 census its population was 296.

Soiana is about 35 km from Pisa and 5 km from Terricciola.
