= Adriano Tilgher =

Adriano Tilgher may refer to:

- Adriano Tilgher (philosopher) (1887–1941), Italian relativist philosopher
- Adriano Tilgher (politician) (born 1947), Italian far-right activist
