= Ercolano =

- Comune
- Comune di Ercolano
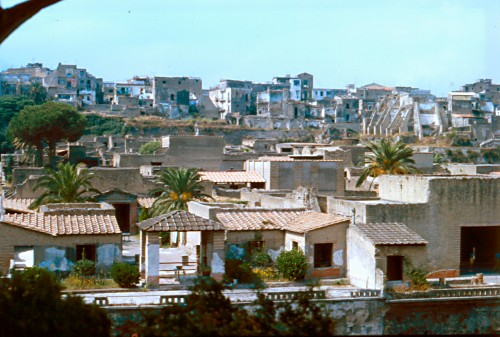
- View of Ercolano

- Coat of arms

- Location within Italy Location within Campania
- Coordinates: 40°48′N 14°21′E
- Country: Italy
- Region: Campania
- Metropolitan city: Naples (NA)
- Frazioni: San Vito

Government
  - Mayor: Ciro Buonajuto

Area
  - Total: 19.89 km^{2} (7.68 sq mi)
- Elevation: 44 m (144 ft)

Population (2026)
  - Total: 49,179
  - Density: 2,473/km^{2} (6,404/sq mi)
- Demonym: Ercolanesi
- Time zone: UTC+1 (CET)
  - Summer (DST): UTC+2 (CEST)
- Postal code: 80056
- Dialing code: 081
- Patron saint: Assumption of Mary
- Saint day: 15 August
- Website: Official website

Ercolano (Italian: [erkoˈlaːno]) is a city and comune (municipality) in the Metropolitan City of Naples in the region of Campania in southern Italy. It lies at the western foot of Mount Vesuvius, on the Gulf of Naples, just southeast of Naples. It has 49,179 inhabitants.

The medieval town of Resina (IPA: [reˈziːna]) was built on the volcanic material left by the eruption of Vesuvius (79 AD) that destroyed the ancient city of Herculaneum, from which the present name is derived. Ercolano is a resort and the starting point for excursions to the excavations of Herculaneum and for the ascent of Vesuvius by bus. The town also manufactures leather goods, buttons, glass, and Lacryma Christi, 'Tears of Christ' wine.

== History ==
=== Ancient Herculaneum ===
According to legend, Herculaneum was founded by Hercules, who was returning from one of his Twelve Labours. Historically, it was most likely founded by the Oscans, an Italic tribe of the 8th century BC, and later became part of both the Etruscan and Samnite dominions. Under the control of the Romans, the city was a renowned seaside resort where some of the richest Roman citizens spent their summer vacations. It was built according to the standard model of Hippodamus of Miletus with a grid of crossing Decumans and Cardos. The houses were elegant and large and there were public buildings that were abundant and large, compared to the small number of inhabitants (estimated to be 5,000).

On 5 February AD 62, the resort city suffered heavy damage from violent earthquakes. Restoration projects were still ongoing at that time and were cut short in AD 79, when Vesuvius violently erupted and completely buried the small city under thick layers of hot volcanic debris. Unlike neighboring Pompeii, which was buried under pumice and fine ash, the citizens of Herculaneum died of severe thermal shock from successions of superheated pyroclastic surges and lava flows.

=== Founding of Resina ===
After the eruption of AD 79 the area was slowly re-populated and in AD 121 the old coast road from Naples to Nocera was probably in place. In the Basilica di Santa Maria a Pugliano are two early Christian marble sarcophagi from the 2nd and 4th centuries AD which give evidence of habitation on the site of the buried Herculaneum.

There are no historical records covering the period between the collapse of the Western Roman Empire and the year 1000, but it is certain that the coast near Mount Vesuvius would have been exposed to frequent wars as a result of the peoples and armies invading the Empire. The first records of the existence of a village named Resina or Risìna, (… de alio latere est ribum de Risina… ; … de alio capite parte meridiana est resina …, etc.), are from the 10th century.

The etymology of the name is controversial. Some academics believe that it comes from a corruption of Rectina, the name of the Roman noblewoman from Herculaneum who asked Pliny the Elder for help during the eruption in AD 79. Other explanations are that the name could come from the Latin word raetincula, meaning the nets used by the fishermen of Herculaneum, or from the resin of trees grown on the ancient lava, or from the name of the river that flowed alongside Herculaneum. Finally some suggest that the name is the anagram of sirena (siren): a siren was the symbol of the village and the town of Resina until 1969.

Documents from the 11th century indicate the presence of a chapel dedicated to the Virgin Mary on a hill called Pugliano whose name probably derives from Praedium Pollianum, an ancient estate outside Herculaneum whose owner was called Pollio.

=== Renaissance ===
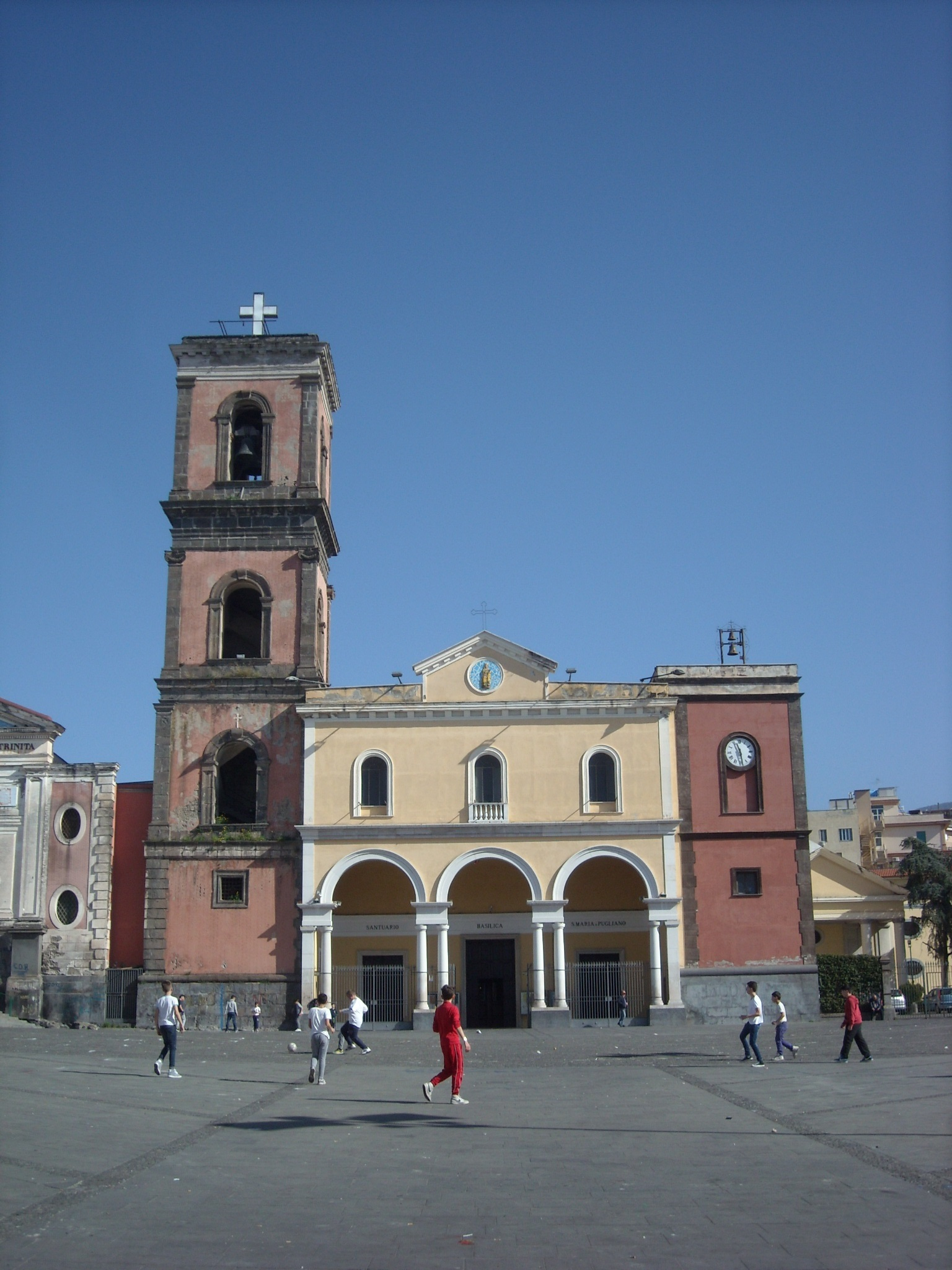
Basilica of Santa Maria a Pugliano

In 1418 Queen Joanna II of Naples granted the Università (villages with local governments) of Torre del Greco, Resina, Portici and Cremano to her favourite Sergianni Caracciolo and later to Antonio Carafa. Thereafter these villages remained in the possession of the Carafa family and were subject to events within the family and the wider history of the Kingdom of Naples.

Resina's main industries were agriculture, fishing (including collecting corals, an activity also performed by the inhabitants of Torre del Greco), and the cutting and carving of volcanic stone. In the 16th century the veneration of the Madonna di Pugliano, who was venerated in the church of Santa Maria a Pugliano, was so widespread that large numbers of pilgrims flooded in from the surrounding areas. In 1574 the church was first mentioned as Basilica pontificia; two years later it became the parish church of Resina, the parish also including the neighbouring town of Portici until 1627.

The violent 1631 eruption of Mount Vesuvius took place after a long dormant period and devastated the surrounding area, killing more than 4000 people and changing the local geography. The volcano's eruption was its second most destructive ever, exceeded only by the eruption that destroyed Pompeii and Herculaneum in AD 79. Two lava flows approached Resina but these were kept separate as they flowed around the hill of Pugliano, sparing the houses of the village. One of the flows filled the valley on the western side of the hill and when it solidified the village expanded onto the newly created plain. The wide road via Pugliano was built running straight up to the basilica on the top of the hill.

After about three centuries of feudalism, Resina and its neighbours Portici, Torre del Greco and Cremano liberated themselves from their status as baronial subjects in 1699 by paying 106,000 ducats to the Crown (plus an additional 2,500 ducats for ancillary expenses) as "baronial ransom". Resina paid one third of the total amount. The event is one of the most memorable in the history of Resina and the neighbouring towns.

=== Re-discovery of Herculaneum ===
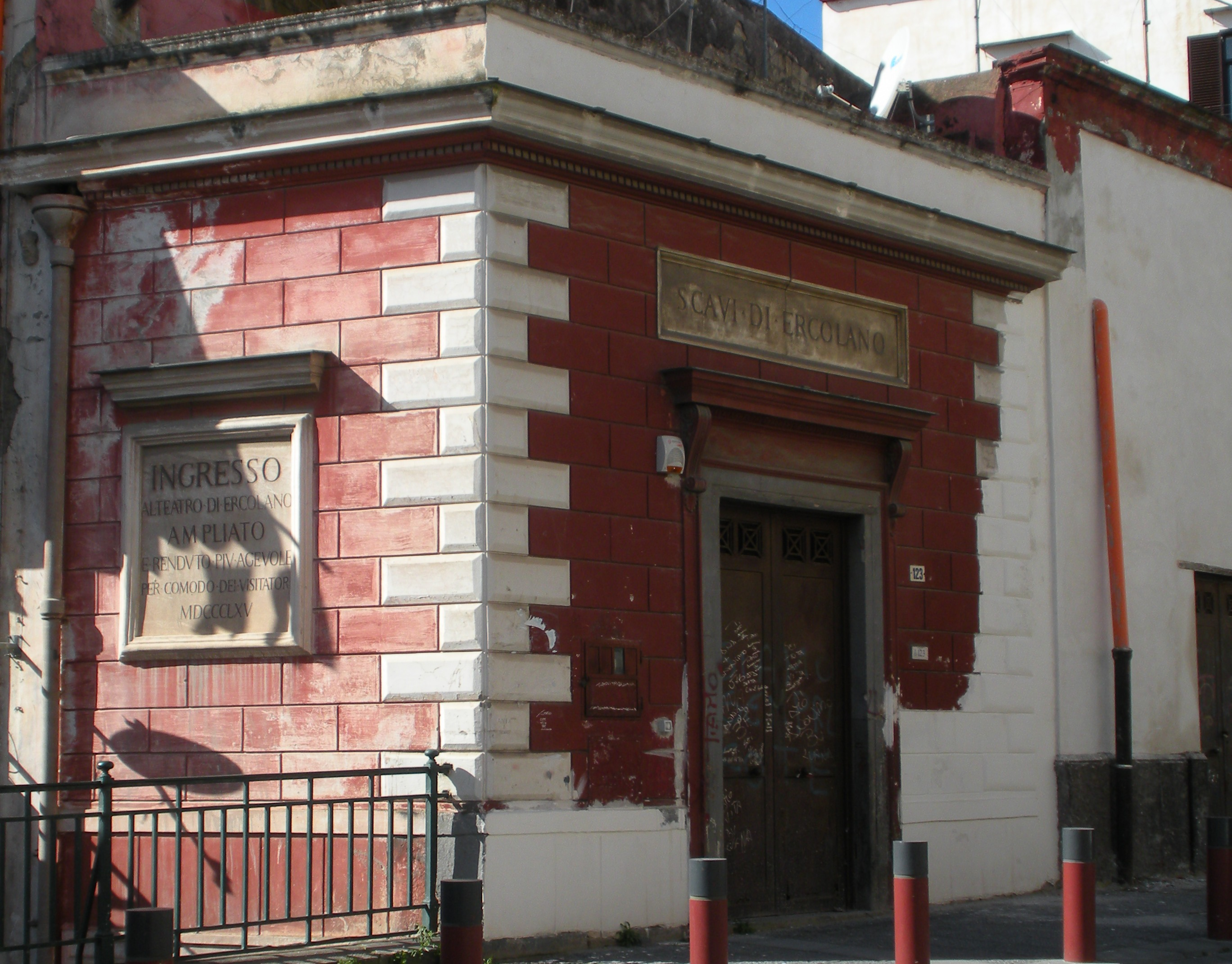
Entrance to the underground theatre of ancient Herculaneum

In 1709 Emmanuel Maurice, Duke of Elbeuf was constructing a residence on the Italian coast at Portici when he heard about a man who had discovered ancient marble sculptures and columns while digging a well in the nearby town of Resina. The duke bought the man's farm and began digging shafts and tunnels. He excavated statues, columns and marble sculptures, placing some of them in his Portici residence and giving others as valuable gifts to his friends and relatives and to the monarchs of Europe.

The news reached King Charles VII of Naples, who was aware of the importance of the finds. He bought the duke's farm and started methodical excavations with the aim of unearthing all the valuable antiquities buried there. As the discovery of ancient Herculaneum became known around Europe, impetus was given to the Western cultural movement known as Neoclassicism and to the custom among the British and European upper-class of taking of the Grand Tour.

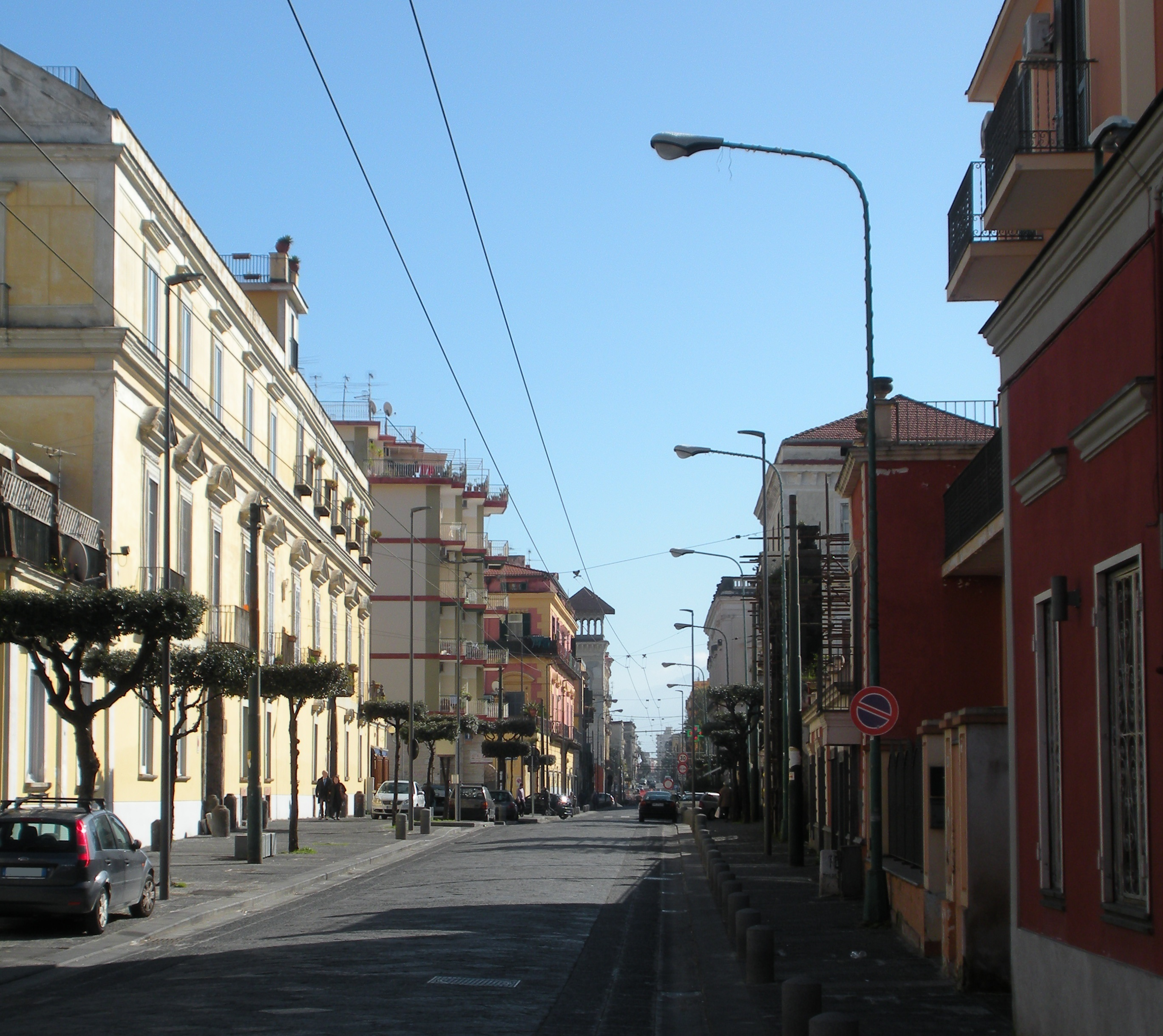
A view of the Golden Mile street in the centre

Enthusiastic about the large amounts and the beauty of the archaeological finds, the king had the summer Palace of Portici constructed, on the border with Resina. Findings of Herculaneum were housed in a dedicated part of the palace, which was open for the king's guests.

The size of the collection increased after 1750, when exploration of the large suburban villa of the Pisoni family brought large amounts of wooden and marble statues to light: the two corridori (racers) or lottatori (wrestlers) and the Sleeping Mercury are the most well-known ones. Of special importance was the discovery in 1752 of the burnt papyrus scrolls of the library of the villa, known today as the Villa dei Papiri. They were carefully unrolled using a special machine made by Fr. Antonio Piaggio, containing the work of the epicurean Greek philosopher Philodemus.

=== Growth of modern Resina ===
Following the king's example, nobles of the kingdom started building their summer villas and gardens next to the royal palace and the surrounding area. On the stretch of the main street called Strada Regia delle Calabrie, which is the royal street towards to the region of Calabria, from the centre of Resina to the beginning of nearby Torre del Greco, large and representative villas were constructed. This part of the street is known as the Golden Mile (Miglio d’Oro). Amongst the most outstanding buildings are the Villa Campolieto, designed by Luigi Vanvitelli, and the Villa Favorita, designed by Ferdinando Fuga. The Villa Favorita received its name from Queen Maria Carolina of Austria, because the place reminded her of her childhood's surrounding of Schönbrunn Palace in Vienna.

In 1799 during the last days of the Parthenopaean Republic, final fights took place in the streets of Resina and Portici between the king's supporters and the republicans. To celebrate the return of King Ferdinand IV of Naples against the "atheist" and pro-French republic, the inhabitants of Resina constructed a chapel of thanksgiving with a crucifix on the spot that replaced the republican Tree of Freedom. On 27 June 1802, the king returned in Naples landing to the pier of Villa Favorita.

During the kingdom of Joachim Murat, Villa Favorita still was used for parties and celebrations held by the king and the winding and narrow leg of the Strada Regia delle Calabrie in Resina was straightened and widened throughout the town centre.

=== 19th to 20th centuries ===
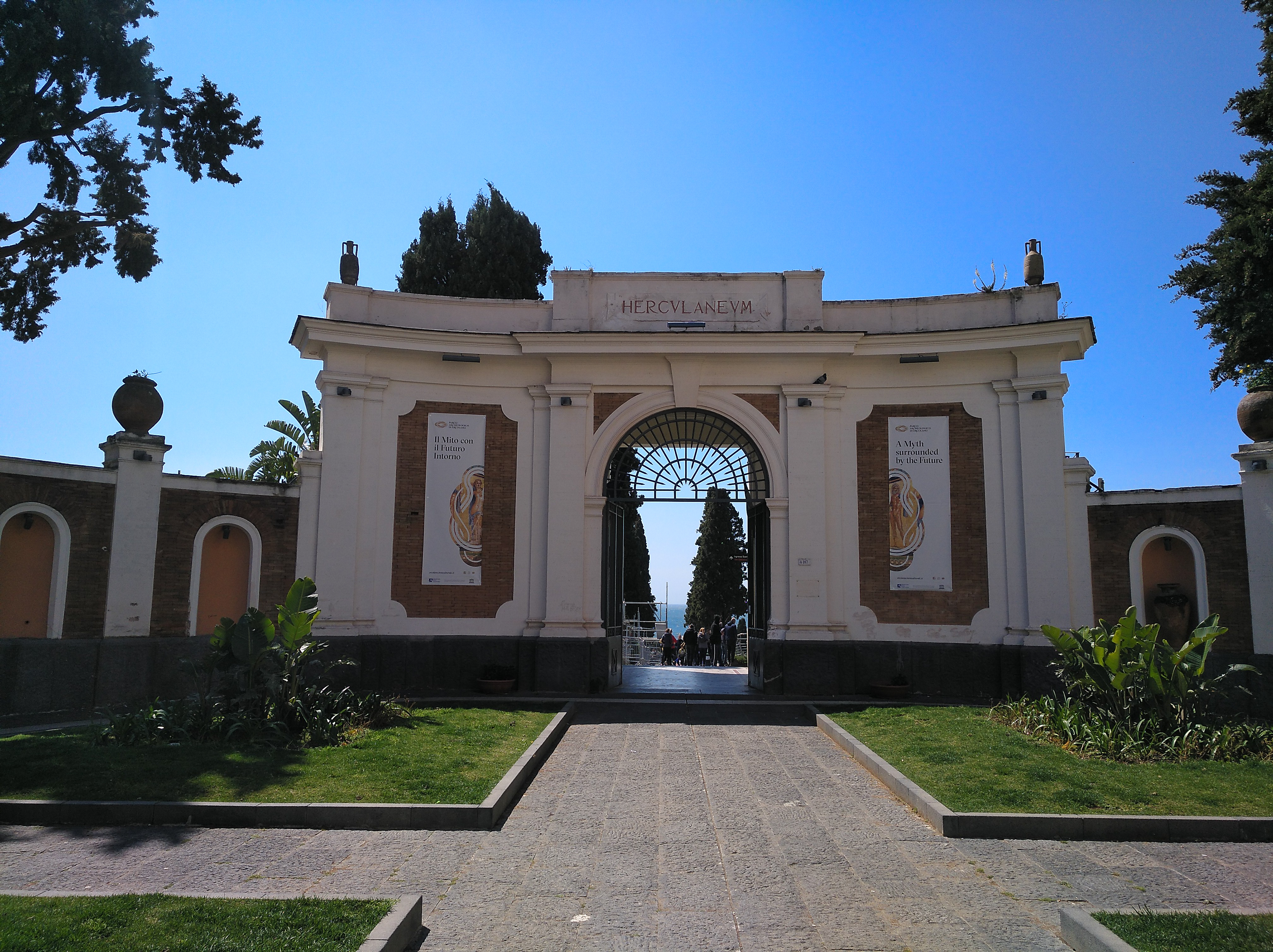
The northern entrance to the Archeological Site of Herculaneum from town centre

The area changed following the construction of the first Italian railway in 1839 and the establishment of industrial facilities such as glassworks and tanneries along the coast. Nevertheless, Resina remained an agricultural town, known for its fruit and healthy air, and it was famous as a tourist destination with visits to the underground Theatre of Herculaneum and ascents to the crater of Mount Vesuvius.

In 1845 the Royal Vesuvius Observatory (Italian: Real Osservatorio Vesuviano) was opened, the oldest volcanology institute in the world.

In 1863 the local artist Marco de Gregorio was part of the School of Resina, an artistic movement that broke with tradition by painting in a non-academic realistic style.

In 1865 the King of Italy Vittorio Emanuele II inaugurated the open-air excavations of Herculaneum.

In 1880 the funicular railway on Mount Vesuvius was opened, and the event inspired the well-known Neapolitan song Funiculì, Funiculà. The funicular was repeatedly wrecked by volcanic eruptions and abandoned after the eruption of 1944.

In 1904 the Circumvesuviana railway began running services from Naples to Castellammare di Stabia with a station in Resina-Pugliano, close to the Basilica of Santa Maria a Pugliano and the Mount Vesuvius funicular. In 1927 King Vittorio Emanuele III of Italy inaugurated the new entrance of the archaeological site of Herculaneum on the Miglio d’Oro, and a new street was opened some years later to join the archaeological site to the Circumvesuviana railway and funicular stations.

The second oldest Italian motorway was opened in 1930 from Naples to Pompeii, with an exit at Resina.

From the second half of the 19th century until well into the 20th, Resina was a residential and holiday town for both the aristocracy and the Neapolitan middle class. They used the classic villas of the Miglio d’Oro as well as more modern ones such as Villa Battista, an elegant Art Nouveau building. Among the famous people who lived in or frequented the town are the poet and writer Gabriele D’Annunzio, the scientist Arnaldo Cantani, the former Khedive Isma'il Pasha of Egypt (who opened the Suez Canal and lived in exile in Villa Favorita for the six years 1879–1885), the Italian prime minister Antonio Salandra, the Minister for Foreign Affairs Carlo Sforza, and King Gustaf VI Adolf of Sweden who was an amateur archaeologist. Large numbers of other celebrities also came to Resina to visit the underground theatre and the archaeological site of Herculaneum and Mount Vesuvius.

Famous citizens of Resina included Benedetto Cozzolino who founded a school for the deaf and dumb in 1788 (the first in the Kingdom of Naples and the second in Italy after the one in Rome); Amadeo Bordiga, founder with Antonio Gramsci of the Communist Party of Italy (Italian: Partito Comunista d’Italia); the philosopher Adriano Tilgher and the painter Alfonso Marquez.

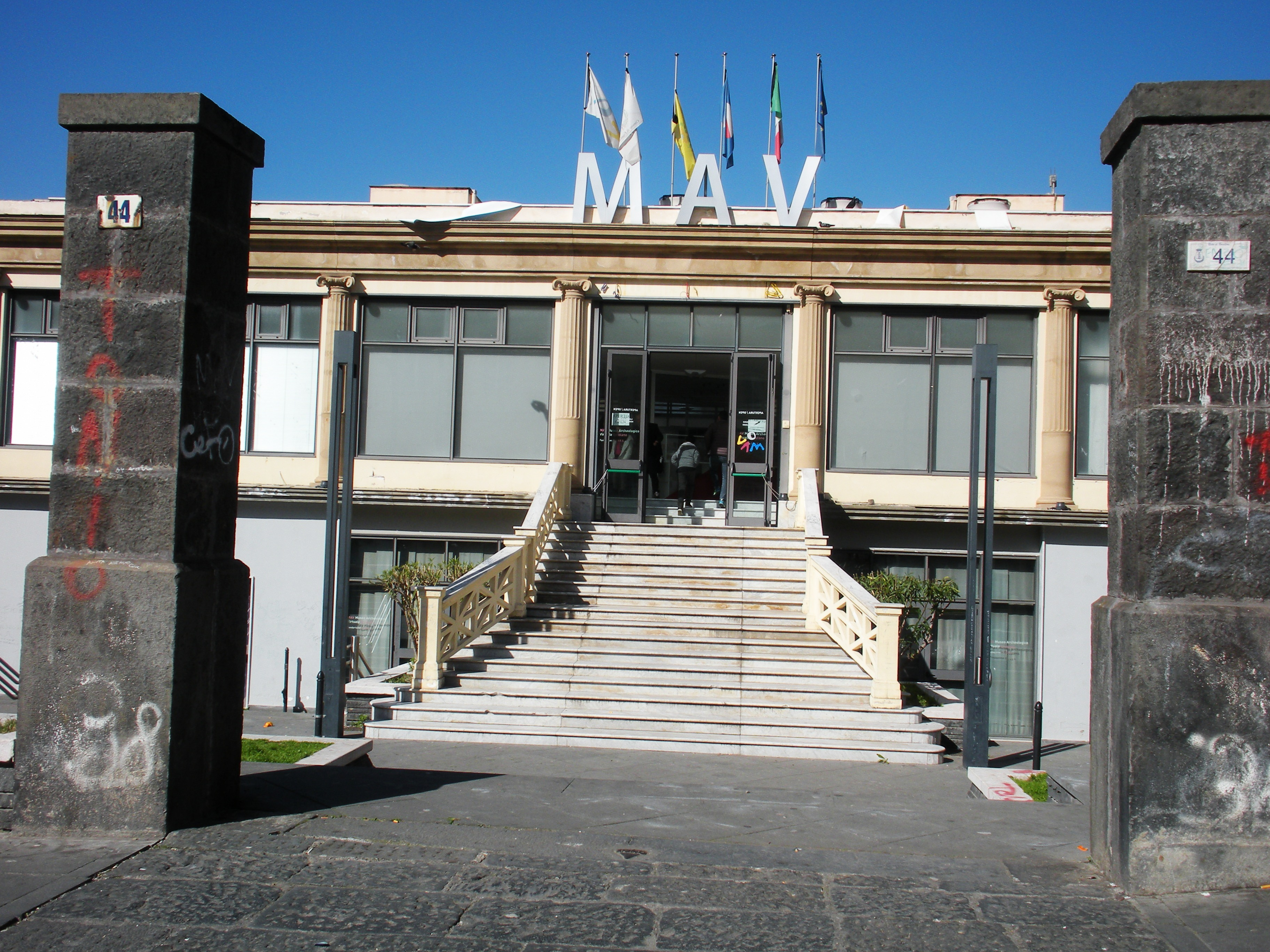
The MAV, The Virtual Archeological Museum

In the years after WWII the street market in Via Pugliano became famous nationwide for selling used clothes ("pezze") that attracted seekers of vintage clothing and bargain hunters.

On 12 February 1969, following a formal request from the Town Council, the President of Italian Republic decreed the change of the name of the town from Resina to Ercolano, which is the Italian version of ancient name Herculaneum.

In 1971 the Ente per le Ville Vesuviane was created and it is now a foundation, with the objective of restoring and preserving the main 18th-century villas. The first villas to be restored were Villa Campolieto, Villa Ruggiero and the seaside park of Villa Favorita and its facilities. They now host cultural events and are the headquarters of cultural institutions and a postgraduate School.

In the 1980s and 1990s the town was hit by an industrial crisis and a dramatic increase in unemployment and crime. Since end of the 20th century there have been strategies to boost social and economic growth focused on tourism and culture.

In 1995 the Mount Vesuvius National Park (Italian: Parco Nazionale del Vesuvio) was created and the entire area of Ercolano north of motorway is included in the Park. In 1997 the Archaeological site of Herculaneum was listed as a UNESCO World Heritage site along with Pompeii and Oplontis. Mount Vesuvius and the Miglio d'Oro were included in the World Network of Biosphere Reserves under the UNESCO Man and Biosphere Reserve Programme. In 2005 the MAV (Virtual Archeological Museum) was opened along with the permanent open-air exhibition Creator Vesevo and its 10 stone sculptures of famous contemporary international artists lining the street towards the Mount Vesuvius crater.

== Demographics ==
Historical population
Year	Pop.	±%
1861	12,693	—
1871	12,396	−2.3%
1881	15,652	+26.3%
1901	20,152	+28.8%
1911	20,566	+2.1%
1921	23,948	+16.4%
1931	28,466	+18.9%
1936	30,707	+7.9%
1951	39,758	+29.5%
1961	45,148	+13.6%
1971	52,368	+16.0%
1981	58,310	+11.3%
1991	61,233	+5.0%
2001	56,738	−7.3%
2011	53,677	−5.4%
2021	50,580	−5.8%
Source: ISTAT

As of 2026, the population is 49,179, of which 48.4% are male, and 51.6% are female. Minors make up 17.1% of the population, and seniors make up 23.0%.

=== Immigration ===
As of 2025, immigrants make up 1.7% of the population. The 5 largest foreign countries of birth are Ukraine, Germany, Romania, Bangladesh, and Brazil.

== Sights ==
=== Archeological Site of Herculaneum ===
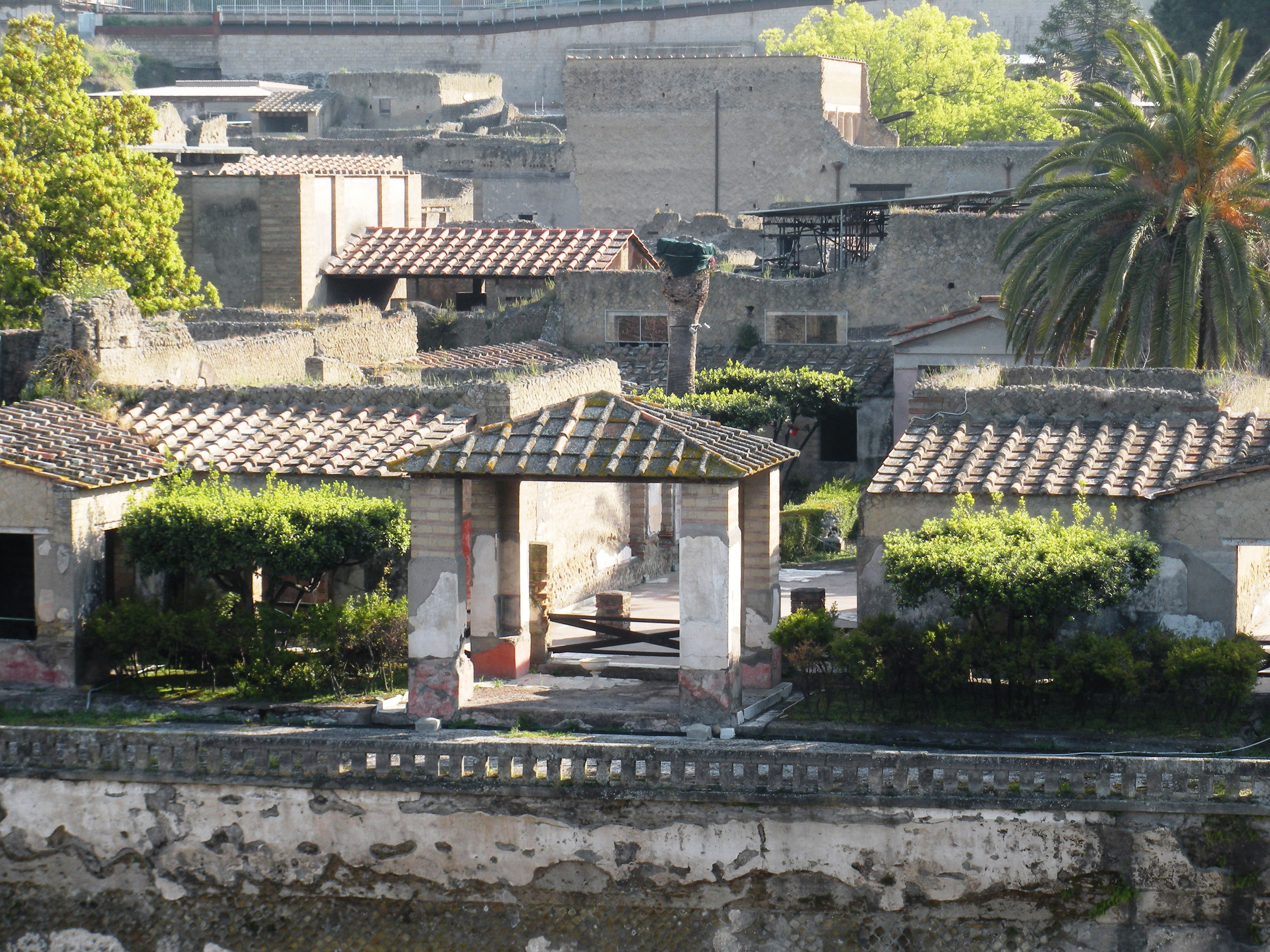
A view of Herculaneum

The Archeological site of Herculaneum (in Italian: Scavi di Ercolano) is the area south of the town centre of modern Ercolano where the Roman town of Herculaneum has been excavated. Herculaneum was destroyed and buried by lava and mud during the eruption of Mt. Vesuvius in AD 79 together with Pompeii, Stabiae and Oplontis. In 1997 the Herculaneum site was listed as a World Heritage Site by UNESCO. Although Herculaneum was discovered before Pompeii, the excavation was so difficult that it was repeatedly interrupted in favour of the easier excavation of Pompeii. Herculaneum is smaller and less famous than Pompeii, but better preserved due to the different volcanic materials that covered the town. In Herculaneum there are many wooden remains (doors, furniture, beams) and organic goods (fruit, bread, seeds, rope) that were burnt in Pompeii. Many Herculaneum buildings still retain their upper floors either entirely or in part. The excavated area of Herculaneum consists of only one quarter of the entire ancient town because the rest of the site still lies beneath modern Ercolano.

A new entrance was recently opened at the eastern side of the archaeological site with a large parking area for cars and buses, souvenir stands, and public gardens. In Corso Resina n. 123 there is the old entrance to the underground Theatre of Herculaneum, the first of the ancient town's monuments to be discovered and made famous around the world. Access to the Theatre has to be negotiated with the office of Scavi di Ercolano depending on the conditions underground.

Today the archaeological site is visited by some 300,000 tourists every year. In 2012 it recorded 288,536 visitors and was the 16th most visited monument in Italy.

=== Basilica of Santa Maria a Pugliano ===
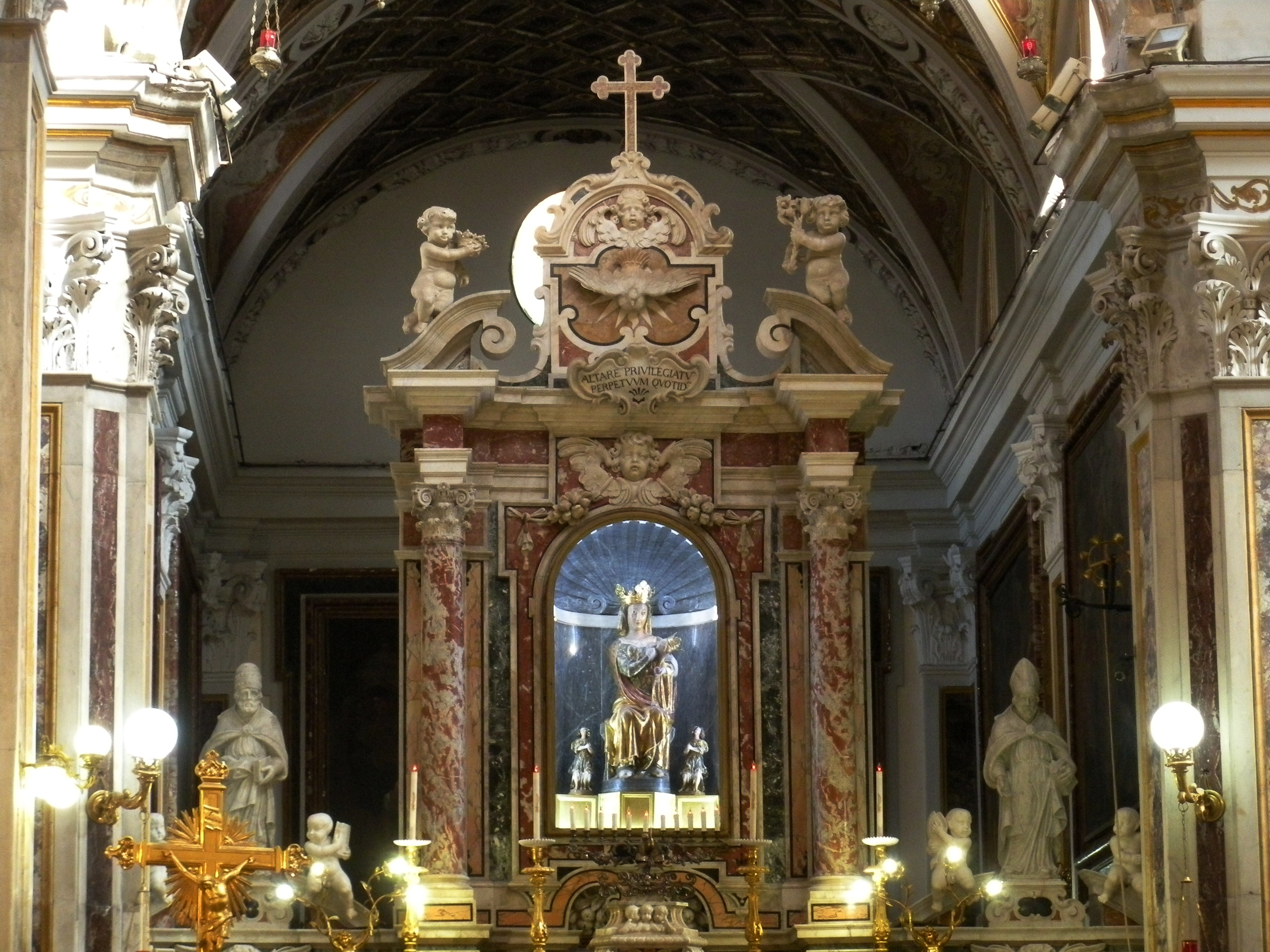
Basilica of Santa Maria a Pugliano: the high altar with the wooden statue of Madonna di Pugliano of the 14th century

The Basilica Pontificia of Santa Maria a Pugliano, in Piazza Pugliano, is the main church of Ercolano and the oldest in town and the area all around Mt. Vesuvius.

=== Il Miglio d’Oro (The Golden Mile) ===
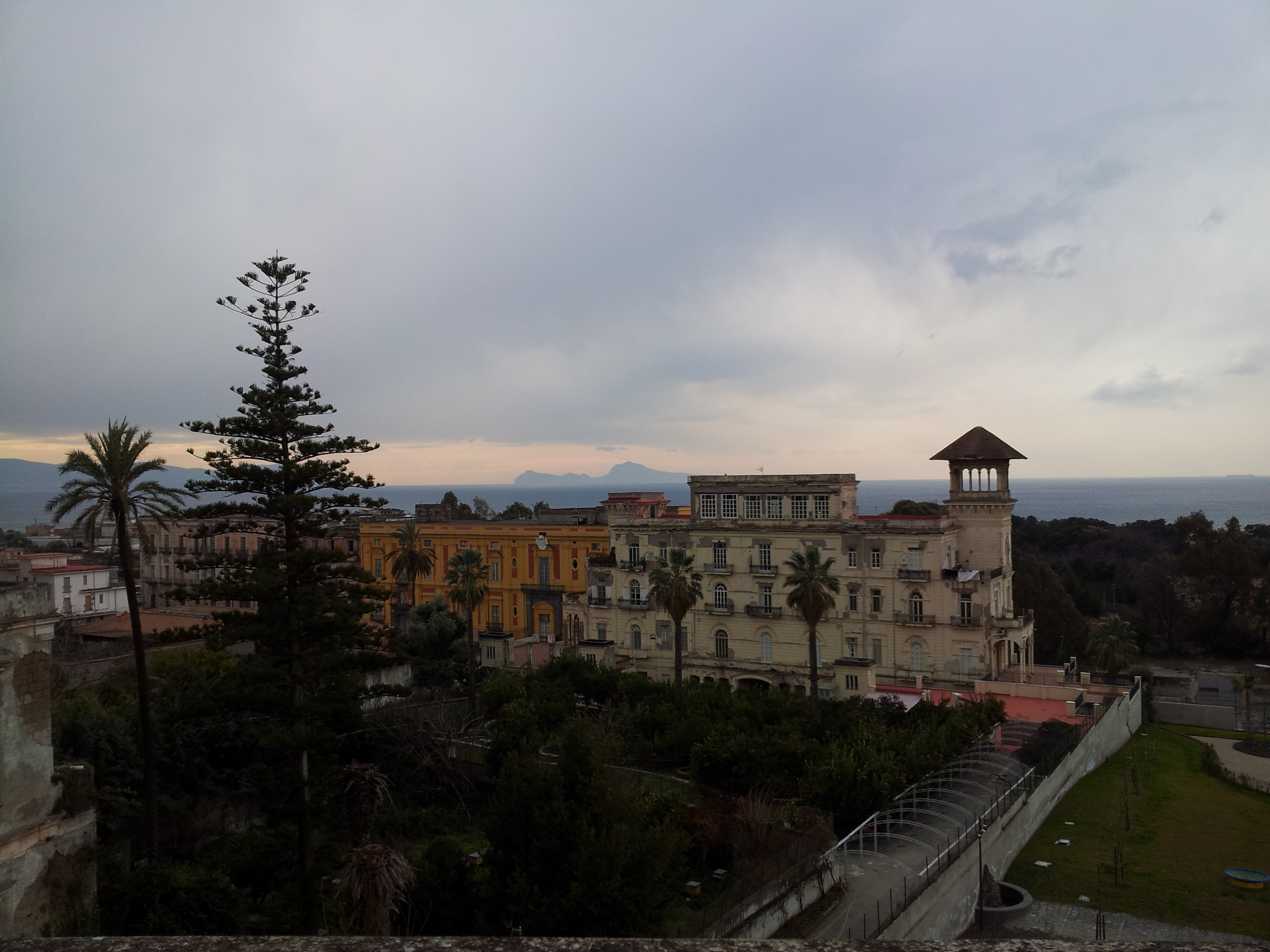
A view of the Golden Mile from Villa Ruggiero: Villa Battista on the foreground and Villa Favorita with its wood on the back. In the background the Bay of Naples with the Isle of Capri

The Miglio d’Oro is the leg of Corso Resina ( the old Strada Regia per le Calabrie) in Ercolano from the Archeological Site of Herculaneum leading to Torre del Greco where are lined the largest, the finest and the most sumptuous villas designed by the best architects of that time and built in the 18th century by the noble families of the Kingdom of Naples around the Royal Palace of Portici. The most famous are Villa Campolieto, Villa Favorita and Villa Aprile. All the villas had backside gardens and woods, some of them rivaling with the ones of the Royal Palace.

In 1997 the Miglio d'Oro, together with Mount Vesuvius, was included in the World Network of Biosphere Reserves under the Unesco's Man and Biosphere Reserve Programme.

Although the expression Miglio d'Oro was created in the 19th century to highlight the splendor of the buildings along the leg of old Strada Regia per le Calabrie in Ercolano (Resina) and the beginning of Torre del Greco, it was recently and inappropriately expanded to a broader area where the 121 villas of the 18th century listed by the Ente per le Ville Vesuviane were built; this area includes the Neapolitan quarters of Barra, San Giovanni a Teduccio and Ponticelli, and the towns of San Giorgio a Cremano, Portici and the whole territory of Torre del Greco.

Villa Campolieto was built in 1755 and designed by Luigi Vanvitelli the architect of the Royal Palace of Caserta who enriched the original project of Mario Gioffredo. Despite its austere and simple façade on the street, the internal side facing the sea opens on a magnificent elliptic exedra with a continuous arcade that also functions as belvedere towards the bay of Naples. The staircase leading to the upper floor is one of the most monumental in private buildings: it is surrounded by large windows and evokes that of the Royal Palace of Caserta. The rooms of the main floor (piano nobile) preserve the original paintings and decoration of Jacopo Cestaro, Fedele Fischetti and Gaetano Magri.

Villa Campolieto hosts the executive office of Fondazione Ente Ville Vesuviane and The School Management Stoà. Also opens for exhibitions, conferences, fairs and festivals. Among the most remarkable events have to be mentioned: the Terrae Motus art exhibition after the earthquake of 1980 and the summer Festival delle Ville Vesuviane.

Villa Favorita, also known as Real Villa della Favorita, was designed by architect Ferdinando Fuga in 1762 for the Principe di Jaci e di Campofiorito who bought and restored a pre-existent smaller building. In 1768 the prince gave a sumptuous party in honour of the King Ferdinando of Bourbon and his wife Maria Carolina of Augsburg who had just arrived from Vienna. The Queen liked the villa which reminded her of Vienna's Schönbrunn Palace and since then it has been called "Favorita" (favourite). In 1792 the villa joined the Crown property and the King bought a close area by the sea so that created a great park from the main building on the street to the sea and a pier for the access by boat. It was frequently used by the royal couple and their children. While living there, the second son of the King, Leopoldo of Bourbon, enlarged the palace and built some pavilions for entertainment and recreation such as the Casino of Mosaics (so called after its interior decoration with a coloured patchwork of mother-of-pearl and porcelain scraps), the Montagne Russe (wooden switchback), two twin coffeehouses on the pier as well as balancoires and bandstands. He used to open the park to his subjects during public holiday.

From 1879 and 1885 Villa Favorita hosted Isma'il Pasha, former Khedive of Egypt who was worldwide famous after the inauguration of Suez Canal. He decorated the interiors of his apartments with a Moorish style and built some Moorish gazebo in the park.

In the 20th century the park was split in two: the palace with the upper park was used as military facility and the park on the sea (Parco sul Mare della Villa Favorita) was used as firmland and after the earthquake of 1980 was requisitioned by the Town Council for temporary housing the evacuated families. In the nineties the Fondazione Ente per le Ville Vesuviane acquired and restored the wood, with the pavilions and the pier and now uses it for exhibitions, concerts and other events.

The main building alongside Corso Resina is remarkable for its double court and the magnificent semicircular staircase on the backside that connects the main hall of first floor to the park and its visible from Villa Campolieto. The façade was recently restored. The wood needs a major restoration.

Villa Aprile also known as Villa Riario Sforza after the first owner who built it in the second half of the 18th century. It is among the largest villas of Miglio d’Oro and keeps one of the most elegant parks still intact nowadays. The author Carlo Celano described the villa as "la regina delle ville" (the queen of the villas). Between 1818 and following years the new owner, the niece of the Duke Riario Sforza, transformed the building by elevating the second floor and the woods giving the ultimate shape: the splendid fountain of Prometheus, little temples, statues, fake ruins and Roman columns, an alpine chalet with a water-lily pond, grotto and spring. From 1879 the villa belonged to the Aprile family until recent years and became a well patronized cultural and fashionable salon and also a comfortable hotel. After decades of neglect, the villa and its park were bought and destined into luxury hotel.

Other interesting and nice villas of the 18th century are: Villa Ruggiero, owned by Fondazione Ente per le Ville Vesuviane, Villa Durante, Villa Granito di Belmonte, Villa Signorini and the Town Hall although the last three are not lined on the Miglio d’Oro.

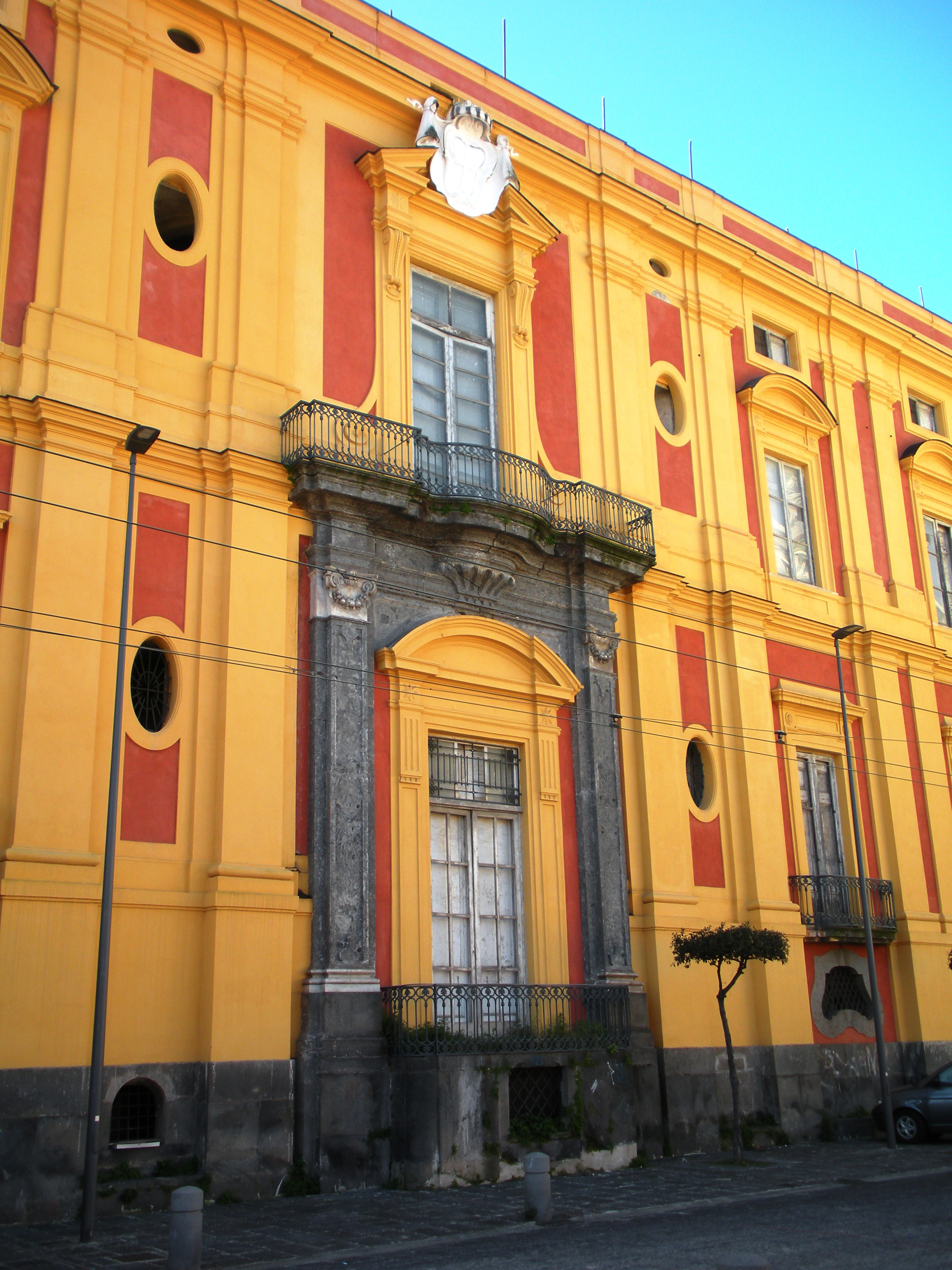
The Real Villa della Favorita

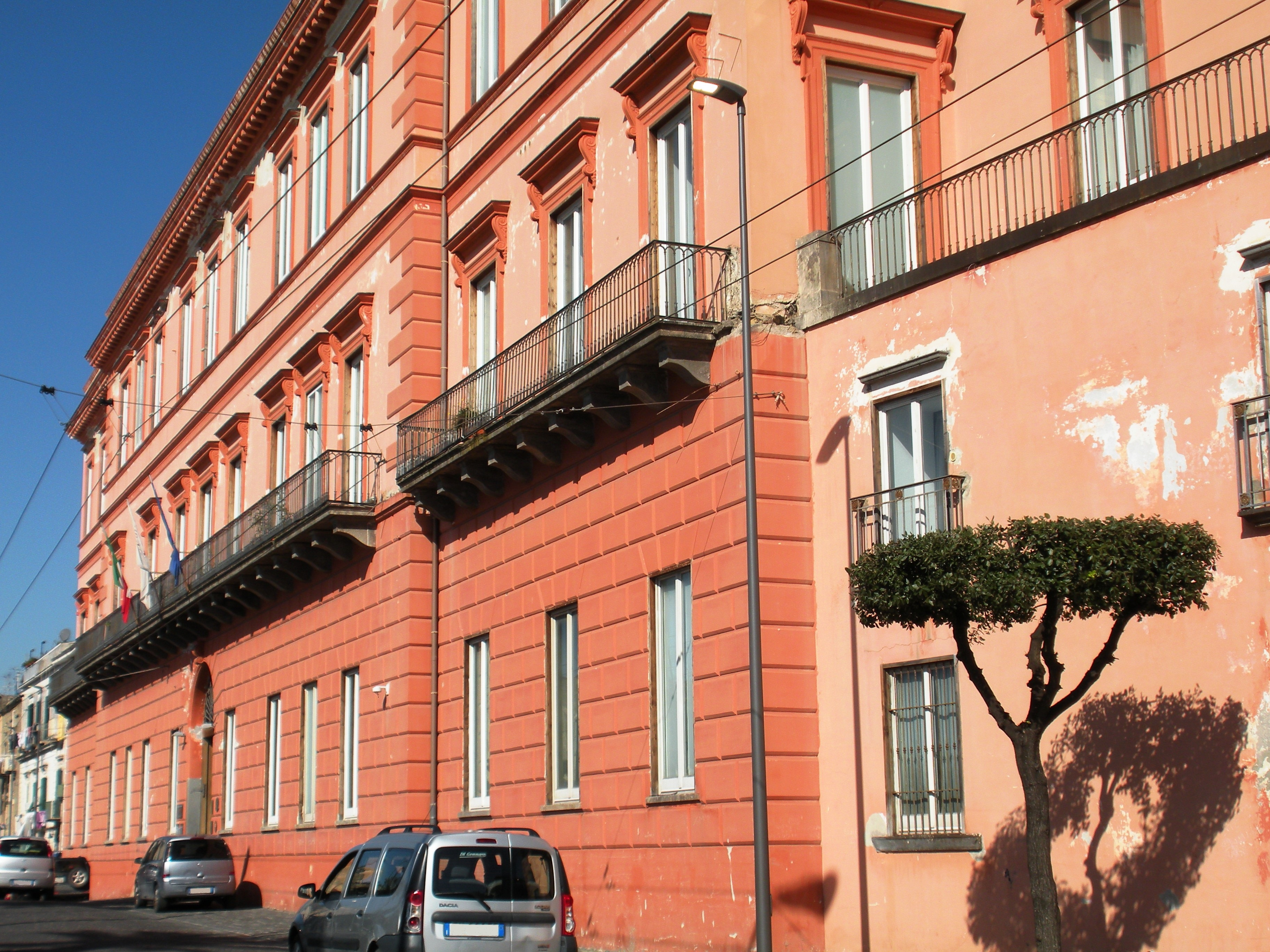
Villa Aprile, former Villa Riario Sforza

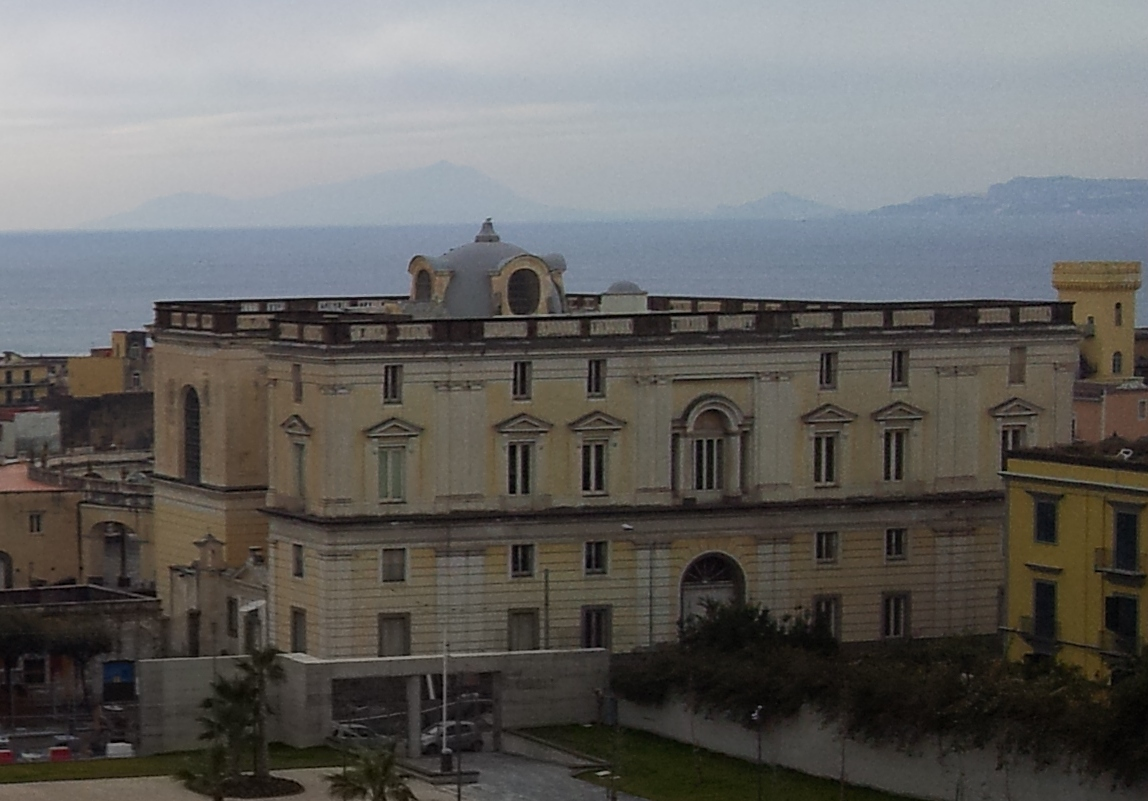
Villa Campolieto

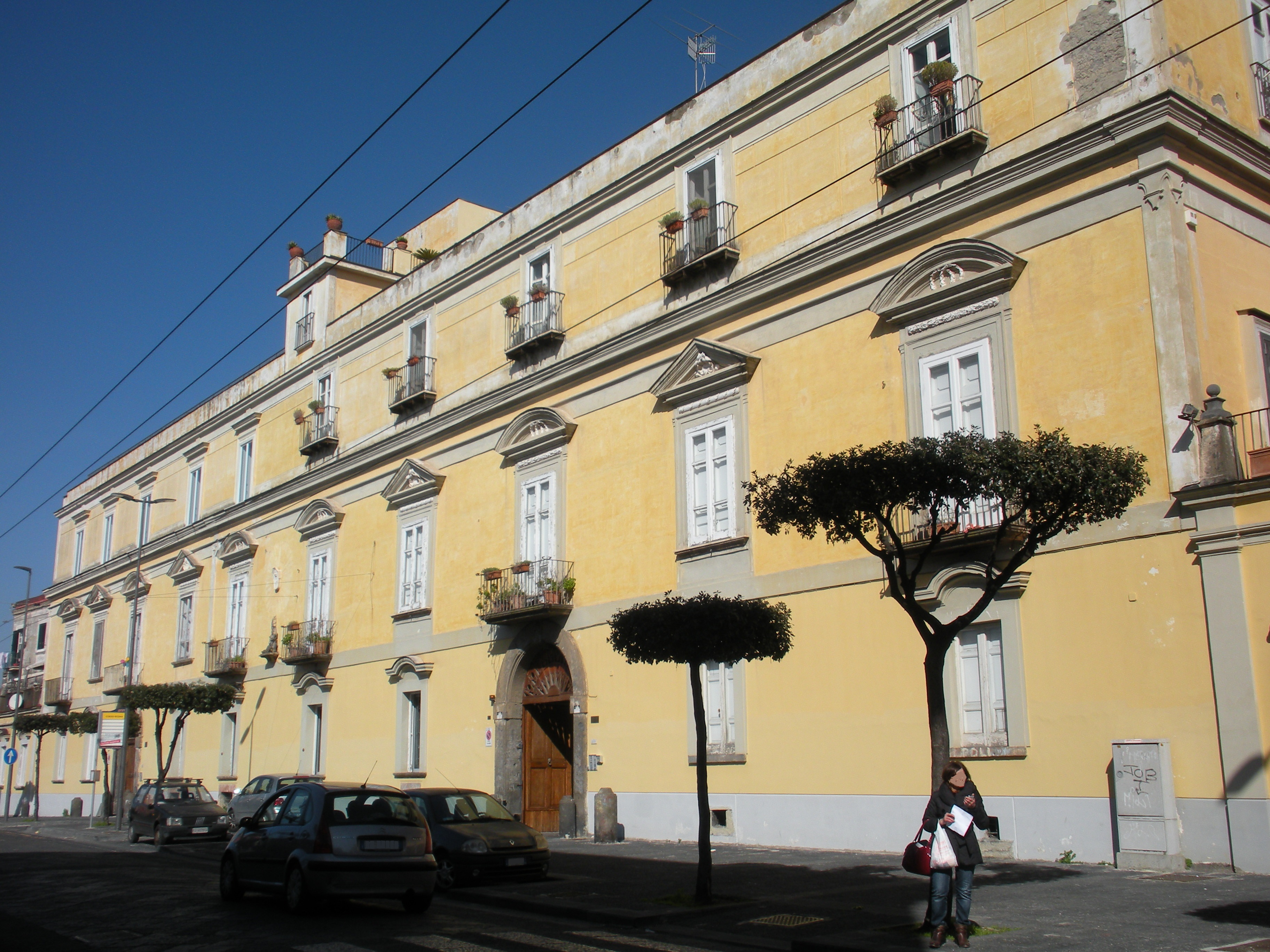
Villa Durante

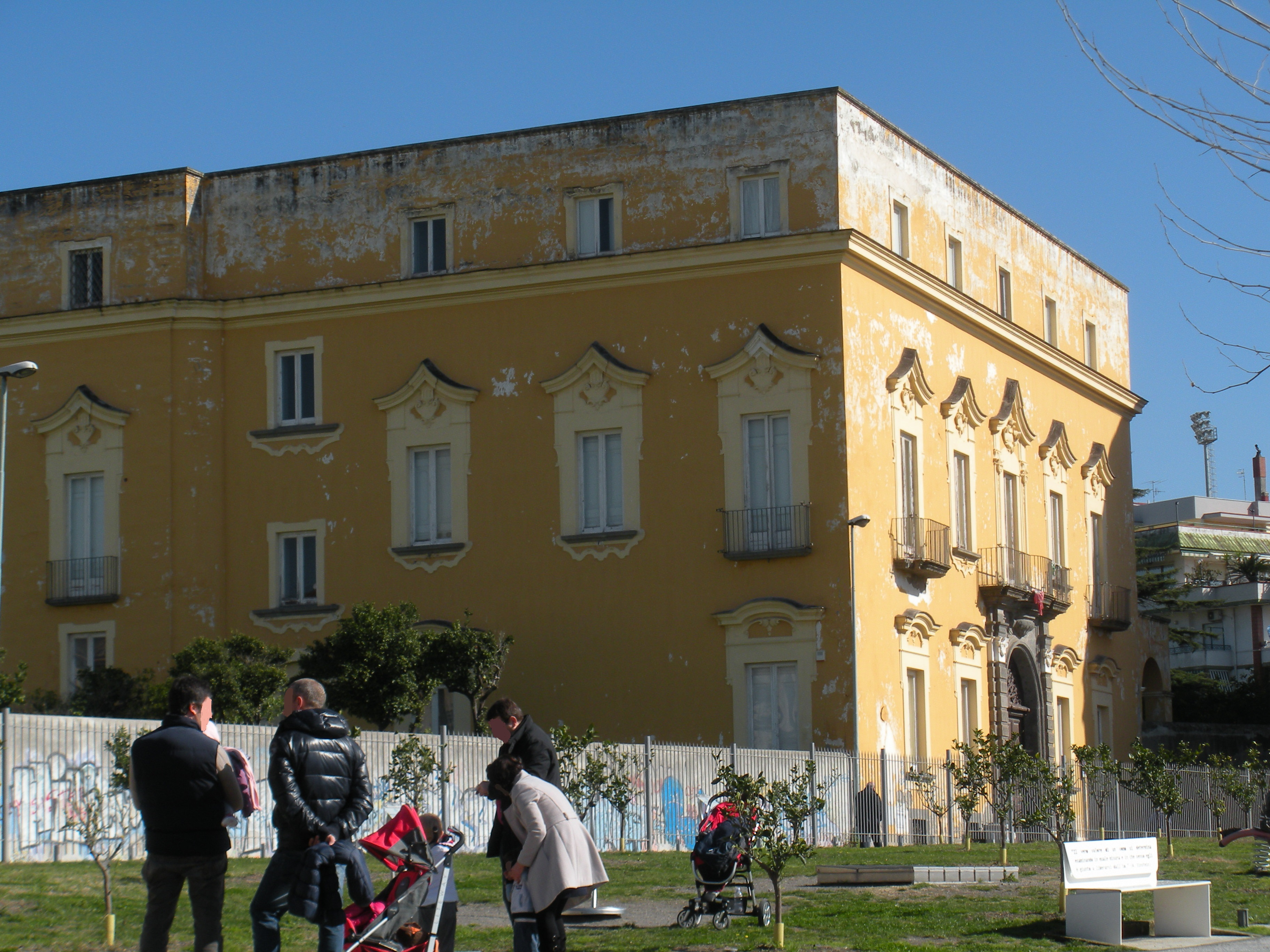
Villa Ruggiero

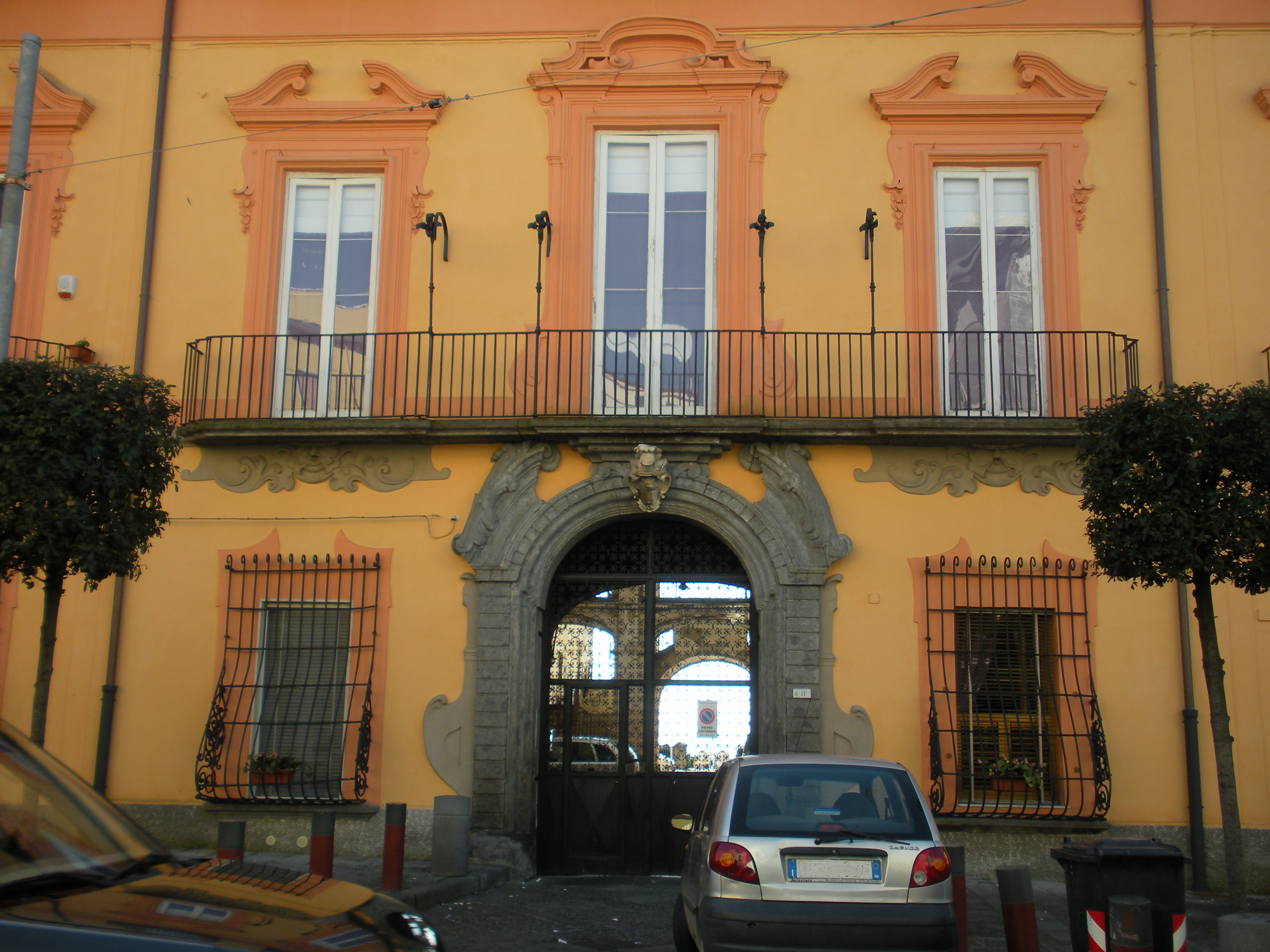
Villa Granito di Belmonte

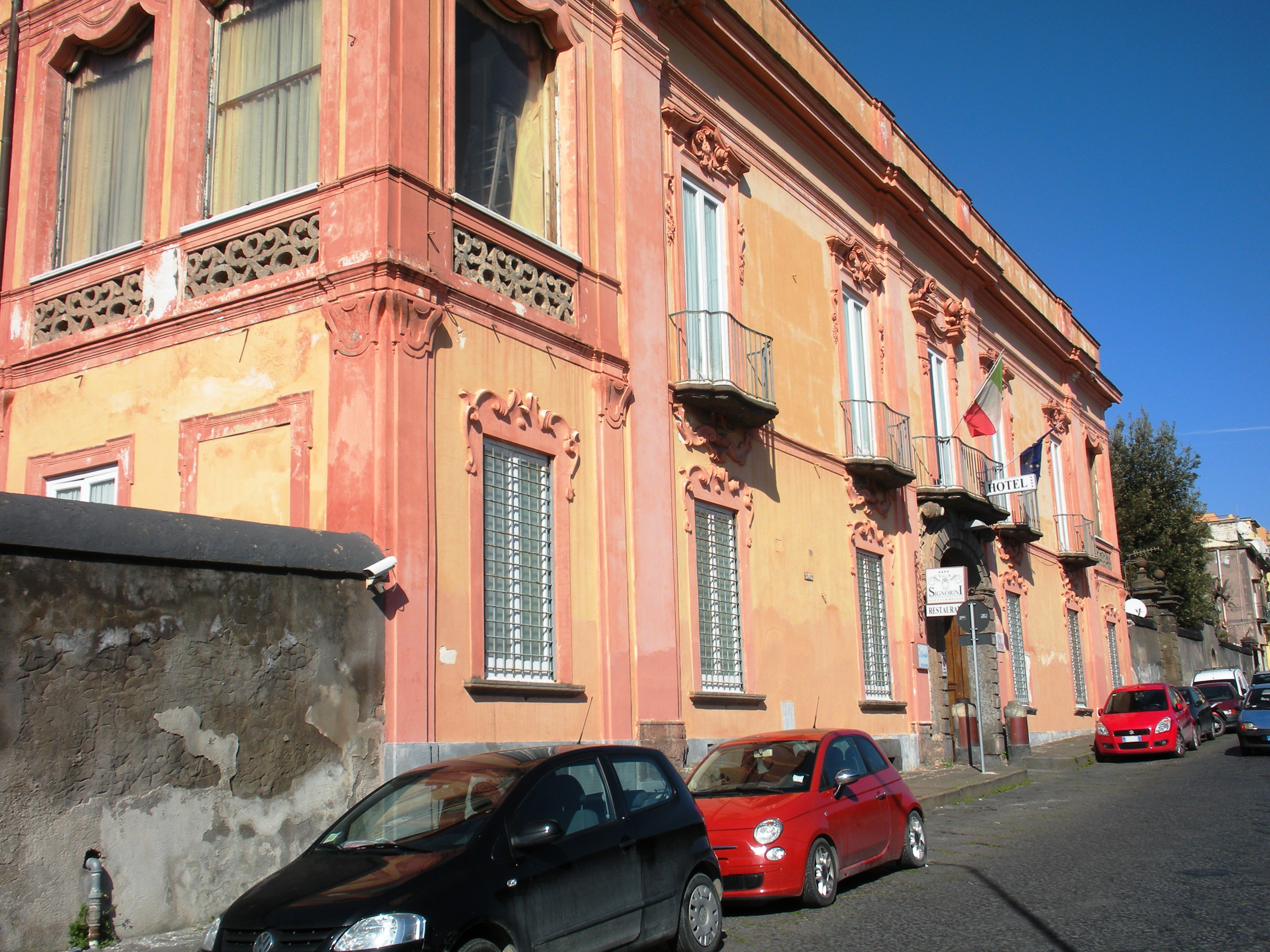
Villa Signorini

=== The street market of Pugliano ===
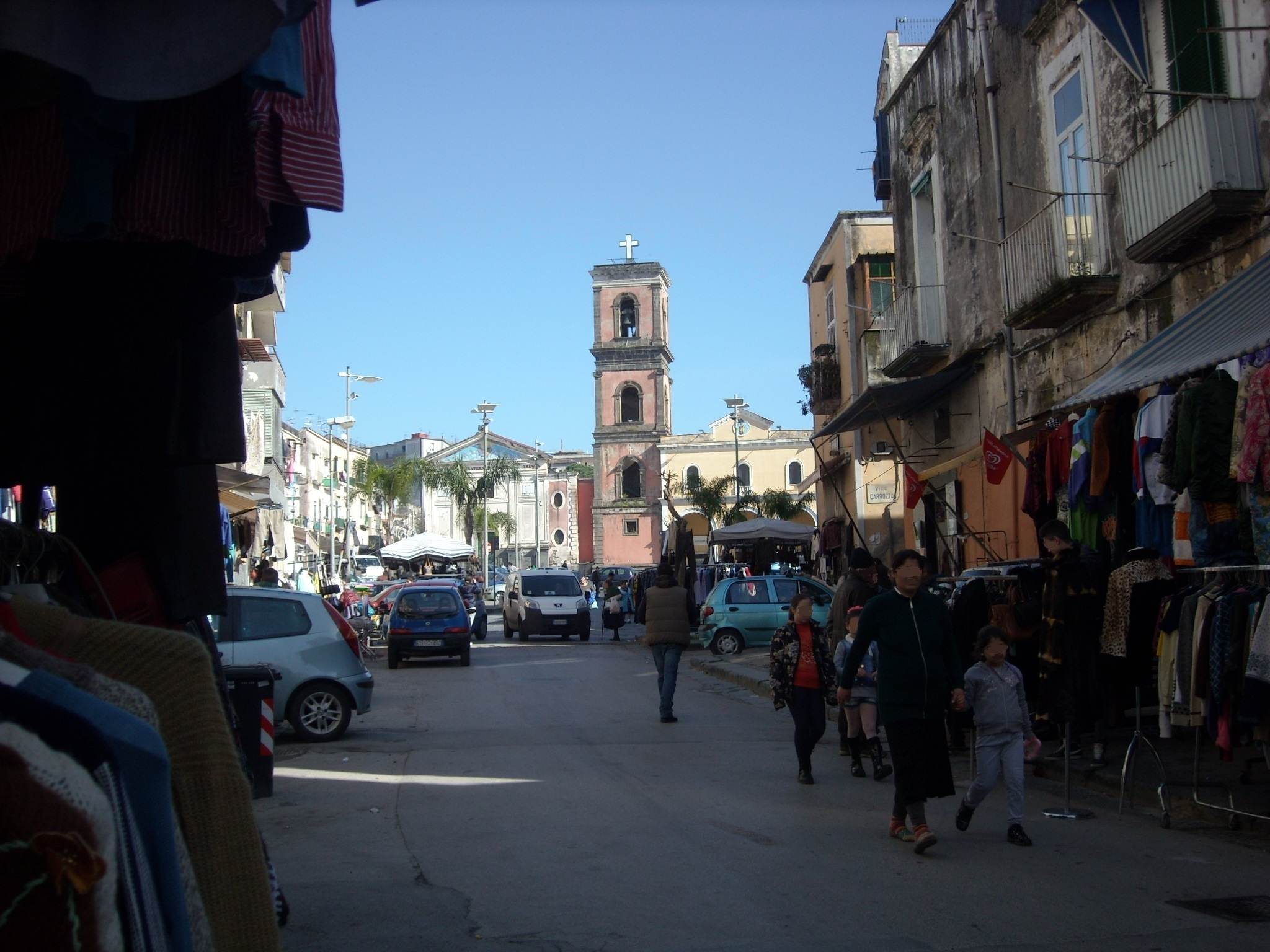
The street market of Pugliano or Resina with the Basilica of Santa Maria a Pugliano background

The Mercato di Pugliano, also known as mercato di Resina, or simply Resina, is a street market on via Pugliano where second hand and vintage clothes (called "pezze" or "stracci") are sold, generally at very low prices.

It began after the end of WWII in southern Italy (1943) in order to sell cheap clothes and accessories to the impoverished population after the economic collapse of the war, but quickly became a well-known attraction for seekers of original, bizarre and old fashioned clothes.

It started at the end of 1943 when Anglo-American troops used some villas and buildings on the Miglio d’Oro as barracks and storage. The lorries transporting these materials towards the motorway north of Pugliano area had to drive along via Pugliano and stop at the Circumvesuviana railway crossing. Here, some adventurous inhabitants of the area silently stole, or in some cases bargained for old parachutes and uniforms to produce bras, corsets and dresses to be sold on the street.

Over the years the street market became permanent and some deals were made to import used clothes from the US, Germany and other countries. The clothes arrived at the market in bales that were opened on the street so that people could select from them. Whatever was unsold or too spoiled to be sold was recycled into new clothes or materials in Ercolano or sent to specialized factories in Prato, near Florence. Together with the old clothes the market now also sells leather and fur coats and jackets, some of them of good craftsmanship.

The market flourished in the 1960s and 1970s but went to decline in the last decades of the 20th century. In recent years it has been having a slow revival.

=== The MAV ===
The Museo Archeologico Virtuale (Virtual Archeologic Museum) opened in 2005 to give a multimedial approach to the history, lifestyle and habits of ancient Herculaneum, and the tragic events of the eruption of Mount Vesuvius in AD 79.

It is an ideal destination for families and students and is centrally located in Via IV Novembre on the way from the Circumvesuviana train station to the northern entrance of the Archeological site from town centre.

The building was erected in the late 1920s as a covered food market. Some years later was converted into school and so was operated until 1980 when suffered major damage by the earthquake and abandoned. After years of complete neglect, at the beginning of the new century the Town Council totally restored it and converted into multi-purpose cultural centre, including the museum, a bookshop and a 300-seat theatre.

=== Parco Nazionale del Vesuvio ===
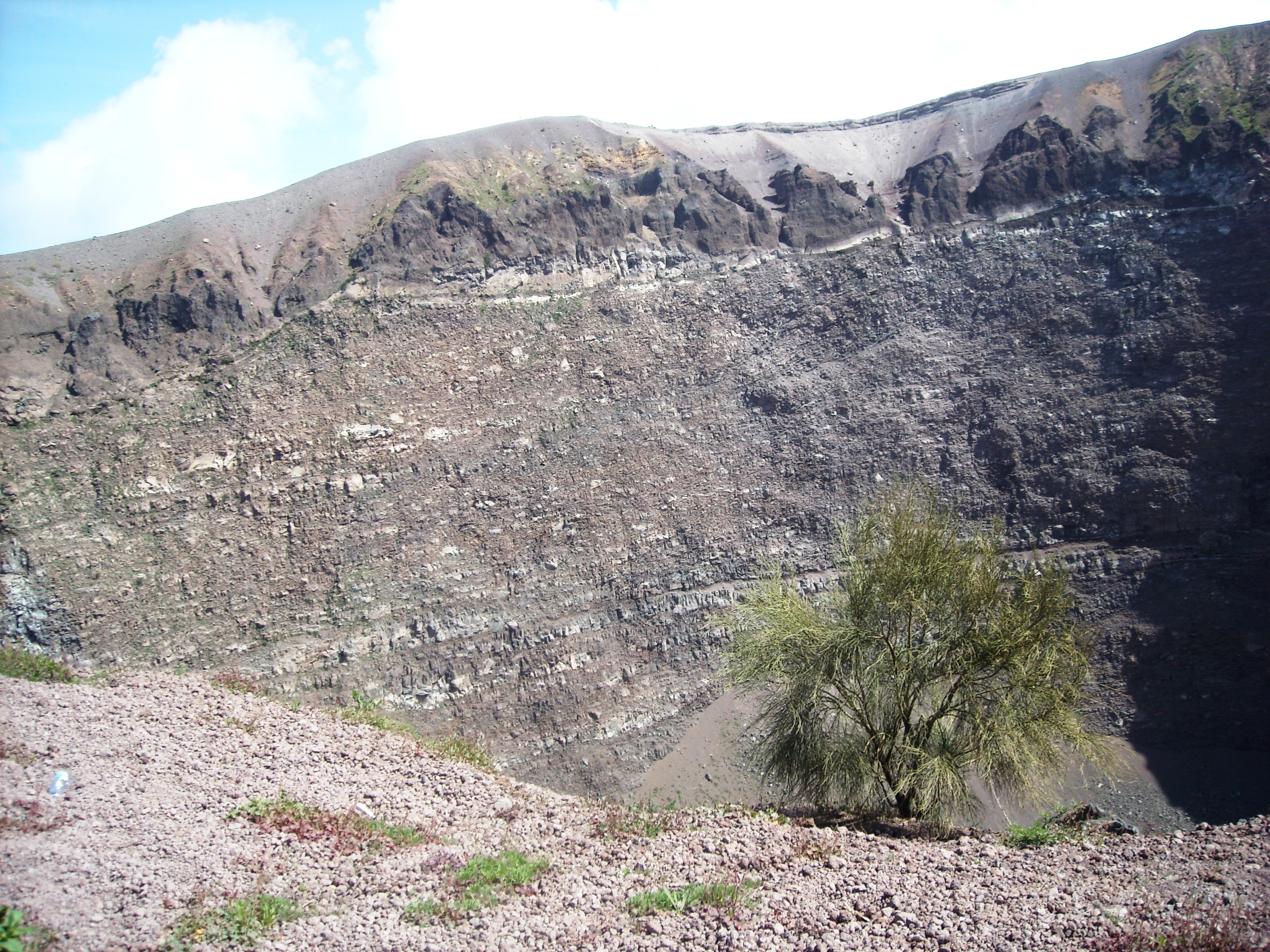
The crater of Mount Vesuvius

The National Park of Mount Vesuvius was created in 1995 by the Italian Government by establishing the Ente Parco Nazionale del Vesuvio, the body in charge of it. The territory of the National Park includes Mount Vesuvius and the surrounding Monte Somma, a section of the older and greater volcanic structure (the caldera) that remained intact after the plinian eruption that buried Herculaneum, Pompeii, Stabiae and Oplontis in AD 79. It is one of the smallest national parks in Italy. Its importance and notoriety are attributed to the presence of the most famous volcano in the world and its geo-morphological features.

In 1997, Mount Vesuvius as Somma-Vesuvio was included in the World Network of Biosphere Reserves under the Unesco's Man and Biosphere Reserve Programme together with the Miglio d'Oro area.

Ercolano is one of the 13 municipalities that has part of its territory included in the area of the National Park. From Ercolano starts the main road that heads to the Gran Cono (12 km from town centre). The final section of the road is only accessible on foot and with a ticket, allowing visitors to hike along the panoramic path to the edge of the crater.

Alongside the first leg of Via Osservatorio, ten stone statues are displayed. These pieces are part of the permanent exhibition titled "Creator Vesevo," created in 2005 by various international artists.

According to the Ente Parco Nazionale del Vesuvio, some of the 11 hiking paths of the National Park are accessible.

From via Osservatorio, it is possible to reach the historic Osservatorio Vesuviano, founded in 1841 by the King Ferdinando II of Bourbon. It is the first center for volcanic studies and monitoring in the world. Nowadays, the Osservatorio Vesuviano is an important section of the Istituto Nazionale di Geofisica e Vulcanologia, where the main Campanian volcanic structures are continuously monitored with multiparametric sensor networks.

The visits to the older building (Real Museo) that hosts, among others, mineral collections and seismographs, have to be agreed with the Istituto Nazionale di Geofisica e Vulcanologia of Naples.

== Culture ==
Since the time of Roman Herculaneum, the area has attracted famous artists, poets, writers and philosophers. The Villa dei Pisoni, for instance, was an international centre of Epicurean philosophy. In the middle of the 15th century, Antonio Beccadelli, known as Il Panormita, built a villa on the seafront of Resina that was named Plinianum where the fellows of the Porticus Antonianum (also called Accademia Pontaniana after Antonio Pontano) used to gather.

Following the discovery of the buried town of Herculaneum and the start of the excavations, artists, scholars and authors from all around Europe begun to converge to Resina and the ruins of Herculaneum were one of main destinations of the Grand Tour.

Some of the most famous architects, painters, and sculptors of that time worked in the town to design and build the villas of the Miglio d’Oro (The Golden Mile) and many villas became important literary salons.

In 1863 the local painter Marco De Gregorio started the Scuola di Resina (School of Resina), an art movement that broke with the academic tradition in favour of a more realistic and intimate vision of the world around. It had some connection with the Macchiaioli movement, and had as main interpreters, together with De Gregorio: Adriano Cecioni, Giuseppe De Nittis, Federico Rossano, Eduardo Dalbono, Nicola Palizzi and Antonino Leto.

Between 1892 and 1893 Gabriele D’Annunzio was guest in Villa D’Amelio in Resina where he found inspiration for his work during those years.

After the establishment of the Ente per le Ville Vesuviane and the restoration of Villa Campolieto, the town of Ercolano hosted international events such as the international exhibition of contemporary art Terrae Motus, conceived by Lucio Amelio after the earthquake of 1980. Villa Campolieto is the location of the Festival delle Ville Vesuviane and hosts the School of Management Stoà.

The town is also home to the MAV, Virtual Archeological Museum, which gives an original multimedia presentation of the history of Herculaneum and the eruption of Mt. Vesuvius in AD 79. In addition there is the Creator Vesevo, alongside the street leading to Mt.Vesuvius, an open air permanent exhibition of stone sculptures created by famous international artists in 2005.

== Economy ==
The typical industries of Ercolano were agriculture, fishery, extraction and manufacture of lava stone, carpentry and retail. Agriculture was spread all over the town district up to the slopes of Mount Vesuvius and enjoyed the mild weather and the fertility of the volcanic soil that made the Vesuvian yields excellent all the time. Fishery was practiced along the coast and in Tyrrhenian Sea including the coral fishing together with the neighbour Torre del Greco.

The Resinesi were local stonemasons and carpenters employed to pave the main roads and to build up the villas of the 18th century on the local Miglio d’Oro street and in surrounding towns. In the 19th century the first factories were mainly settled along the coastline, already altered by the railway. Among the main plants there were a glass manufacture, tanneries, and train manufacture.

After World War II the textile industry flourished around the business of Pugliano street market as well as the nursery gardening mostly on the coastal land that is more suitable for growing flowers and seeds. The need of large facilities for the expanding textile industry clashed against the programs of environment and volcanic prevention and forced many entrepreneurs of Ercolano to move to less-restricted areas of Campania region. This happened to the tanneries and other large factories. The nursery gardening has spread along the coastline south of Naples and Ercolano is one of the largest producers. The flower market on via Benedetto Cozzolino gave a boost to the industry and hosts an international year exhibition focused on cut flower.

Tourism is not a main item of local income, notwithstanding of several accommodating facilities, because the archaeological site of Herculaneum and Mount Vesuvius are a spot destination for tourists who stay in Naples or Sorrento. There are three four-star hotels, and many B&B mostly located on the Miglio d’Oro and on the streets leading to Mount Vesuvius.

On via Benedetto Cozzolino there are many used-car traders.

As concerning the figures of enterprises, the 2011 ISTAT census reports 2,092 enterprises with 4,585 employees. About one half of all (1,011) belong to trade as follows: 545 retail, 334 wholesale, 66 vehicles and motor vehicles (both retail and wholesale). Other main items are professional, scientific and technical consultancies (232 enterprises), manufacture (154), construction (151), social and health assistance (131), accommodation and restaurants (124). As it concerns their status, 21 are stock companies, 274 are limited companies, 19 co-op companies, 1,490 one-man business, professionals and freelances. In 2011 they have been recorded 16.067 income tax returns with a total amount of €346,410,631, that is €21,560 per single declarer and €6,471 per capita.

== Transport ==
=== Connection to Naples, Pompei and Sorrento ===
Ercolano is about 12 km from Naples city centre, 15 km from Pompei and 40 km from Sorrento. It is reachable in many ways:

- Airport

The nearest airport is: Napoli-Capodichino (NAP) 15 km; travelling times: 15min via autostrada and Tangenziale di Napoli

- Motorway: A3 Napoli-Salerno-Reggio Calabria; Exits of Ercolano-Portici e Ercolano (Miglio d’Oro); travelling times from Napoli/Barra toll-gate: 5min; from Pompei: 15min; from Castellammare di Stabia (Sorrento): 20min (to/from Sorrento it takes extra 20min on the SS145 and Costiera Sorrentina drive)
- SS18: Corso Resina (30min to Naples depending on traffic; continuing into Via Università and Corso Garibaldi in Portici and Corso San Giovanni a Teduccio in the Naples suburb of San Giovanni a Teduccio)
- Circumvesuviana railways: Lines Napoli–Sorrento and Napoli–Poggiomarino (via Scafati); stations of Ercolano Scavi (town centre, Herculaneum and Mount Vesuvius) and Ercolano Miglio d’Oro; travelling times: 15min from Napoli – 10min by direttissimo-DD train (only call at Ercolano Scavi) -, 20min from Pompei, 50min from Sorrento; average frequency: any 20min
- Ferrovie dello Stato (national railways): Lines Napoli–Castellammare di Stabia and Napoli–Salerno–Reggio Calabria; stop in Portici-Ercolano station (Piazza San Pasquale, Portici); travelling times: 15min from Napoli Centrale to Portici-Ercolano; average frequency: any 30min
- Connections by sea: Metrò del Mare (operating in summer only – visit: www.metròdelmare.it –); Line 1 Napoli – Sorrento; Favorita pier; travelling times: 35min from Napoli molo Beverello erolano was engulfed with flames/ lava.

=== Local transportation ===
- ANM buses:

Line 5: Portici (train station) – Ercolano – Torre del Greco

Line 176: Portici (train station) – Ercolano

Line 177: Portici (train station) – Ercolano – San Sebastiano al Vesuvio

- Taxi collettivi – van taxi (from Circumvesuviana station of Ercolano Scavi): connection to Mt.Vesuvius

== See also ==
- Aeclanum
- Herculaneum
- Oplontis
- Pompeii
- Stabiae

== Bibliography ==
- D'Angelo Giovanni, "Resina da castellania a baronia", Libreria S. Ciro 1999
- Mario Carotenuto, "Ercolano attraverso i secoli", Napoli 1980
- Mario Carotenuto, "Da Resina ad Ercolano", Napoli 1983
- Mario Carotenuto, "Ercolano e la sua storia", Napoli 1984
- Salvatore Di Giacomo, "Nuova guida di Napoli, Pompei, Ercolano, Stabia, Campi Flegrei, Caserta etc.", Napoli 1923
- CNR, Bologna, 2000
- Antonio Irlanda, "Noi, oratoriani di Resina", Ercolano 2002
