= Aus Italien =

1866 symphony by Richard Strauss

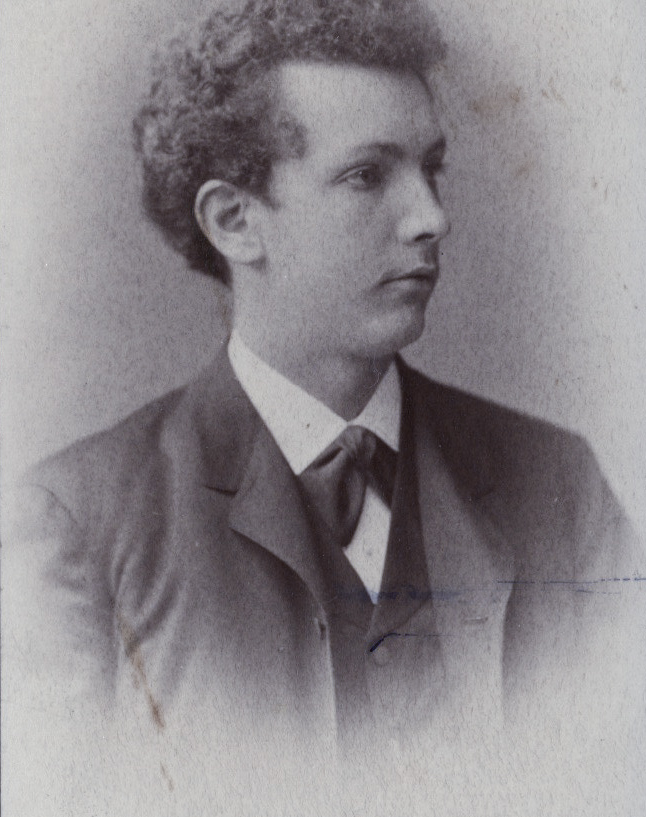
Richard Strauss in 1886

Aus Italien (From Italy), Op. 16, is a tone poem or program symphony for orchestra by Richard Strauss. It was inspired by the composer's visit to Italy (encouraged by Johannes Brahms) in the year 1886. The travel started in Munich on April 17, 1886 and led Strauss via Bologna and Florence first to Rome for a week, then onward to Naples, from there through Sorrento, Salerno, and Capri back to Naples and Rome, and finally via Florence, Milan, Lake Como, and Switzerland back to Munich, where Strauss arrived on May 25. He began to sketch the work while still on the journey. It was completed presumably in the end of 1886 when Strauss was 22 years old. However the exact date is uncertain, because the second movement misses a completion date.

The work is named by the composer as "Symphonic Fantasy", and is dedicated to his mentor Hans von Bülow. It is the only work by Richard Strauss for which he himself wrote a specific program. The entire work takes over forty minutes to perform.

Strauss incorporated the tune of "Funiculì, Funiculà" into the symphony's fourth movement, "Neapolitan Folk Life", thinking it was a traditional Italian folk song, when it was in fact a piece written by Luigi Denza in 1880. The occasionally encountered claim that Denza filed and won a plagiarism lawsuit against Strauss for the use of the song has so far not been verified.

== Premières ==
The first performance of the work took place in Munich on March 2, 1887, by the Court Orchestra, which was conducted by the composer himself. As Richard Strauss's sister Johanna later recalled, the first three movements were received with applause, but the last movement was not well-approved and derisory whistles came from various quarters. Norman Del Mar's biography of the composer tells a different story: the first three movements were not well received, and the final was accorded booing and applause. Strauss himself found the work itself as new and revolutionary, and he was satisfied despite the critical responses for the première.

The first performance in the United States was given on March 8, 1888, with the Theodore Thomas Orchestra (Theodore Thomas conducting) at the Academy of Music in Philadelphia.

== Structure ==
Aus Italien is more similar in form to a conventional symphony than Strauss's other tone poems in that it follows the traditional four-movement symphonic structure. However, the pictorially descriptive quality of the music sets it apart from a conventional symphony, which is absolute music.

1. Auf der Campagna (On the Roman Campagna)
2. In Roms Ruinen (In the Ruins of Rome)
3. Am Strande von Sorrent (At the Beach at Sorrento)
4. Neapolitanisches Volksleben (Neapolitan Folk Life)

== Instrumentation ==
Aus Italien is scored for the following orchestra:

- Woodwind: piccolo, 2 flutes, 2 oboes (2nd doubling English horn), 2 clarinets in B♭, 2 bassoons, contrabassoon
- Brass: 4 horns in F, 2 trumpets in C, 3 trombones
- Percussion: timpani, snare drum, tambourine, cymbals, triangle
- Strings: harp, violins I and II, violas, cellos, double basses

== Discography ==
Performances of the full score only

Conductor	Orchestra	Recorded
Artur Rother	Symphony Orchestra of Radio Berlin	1949
Clemens Krauss	Vienna Philharmonic Orchestra	1953
Henry Swoboda	Vienna Symphony Orchestra	1953
Otakar Trhlík	Ostrava State Philharmonic Orchestra (Janáček Philharmonie)	1971
Rudolf Kempe	Staatskapelle Dresden	1974
Neeme Järvi	Scottish National Orchestra	1988
Vladimir Ashkenazy	Cleveland Orchestra	1989
Riccardo Muti	Berliner Philharmoniker	1989
Zdeněk Košler	Slovak Philharmonic Orchestra	1990
David Zinman	Tonhalle Orchestra, Zurich	2000
Fabio Luisi	Staatskapelle Dresden	2008
Franz Welser-Möst	Cleveland Orchestra	2020

There is also a recording of the two piano version, with the duo pianists Begonia Uriarte-Mrongovius and Karl-Hermann Mrongovius recorded in 1985.
