= Breizh eo ma bro! =

2017 compilation album by various artists

Compilation album by Various artists
- Released: 30 June 2017
- Recorded: 2017
- Genre: Breton music; Celtic music
- Length: 66:00
- Label: Sony Music

Breizh eo ma bro! (meaning "Brittany is my country!" in Breton) is a musical compilation by various artists, who pay tribute to Brittany by performing songs that relate to this region of France.

== Commercial performance ==
The album debuted at number 26 in France, with 3,800 sales. The next week, it rose to number 15, selling 4,820 units. The following week, it fell to number 18, with sales of 3,461 copies. By the end of 2017, the album had sold around 25,000 units.

== Track list ==
| Track # | Song title | Performer | Duration |
|---|---|---|---|
| 1 | "Breizh eo ma bro" | Olivier de Kersauson | 01:01 |
| 2 | "Bro gozh ma zadoù" | Alan Stivell, Gilles Servat, Tri Yann, Louis Capart, Soldat Louis, Renaud Detressan, Gwennyn, Clarisse Lavanant, Rozenn Talec, Cécile Corbel | 02:44 |
| 3 | "Marie-Jeanne Gabrielle" | Cécile Corbel | 04:03 |
| 4 | "Terres d'Irlande" | Olivier de Kersauson | 00:51 |
| 5 | "Brian Boru" | Alan Stivell, Laurent Voulzy | 05:04 |
| 6 | "Le son du bagad" | Olivier de Kersauson | 00:35 |
| 7 | "Le Bagad de Lann-Bihoué" | Boulevard des airs, Bagad de Lann-Bihoué | 04:31 |
| 8 | "La Complainte de Porzh Koton" | Olivier de Kersauson | 00:34 |
| 9 | "Porzh Koton" | Raphaël | 02:39 |
| 10 | "Kergonan" | instrumental (Soïg Sibéril) | 00:54 |
| 11 | Prelude to "La hargne au cœur" | Olivier de Kersauson | 00:32 |
| 12 | "La hargne au cœur – Liberté Armorique" | Alan Stivell, Soldat Louis, Renaud Detressan | 03:09 |
| 13 | "Son ar chistr" | Gwennyn, Tri Yann | 03:21 |
| 14 | Prelude to "La mémoire et la mer" | Olivier de Kersauson | 00:51 |
| 15 | "La mémoire et la mer" | Renan Luce, Clarisse Lavanant | 04:44 |
| 16 | Prelude to "Borders of Salt" | Olivier de Kersauson | 04:44 |
| 17 | "Breizh ar vor" | André Couasnon, instrumental (Bulgarian Symphony Orchestra) | 01:49 |
| 18 | "Borders of Salt – version symphonique 2017" | Dan Ar Braz | 04:15 |
| 19 | "Île" | Clarisse Lavanant | 03:06 |
| 20 | "Courir les îles" | Olivier de Kersauson | 00:37 |
| 21 | "Sur les quais de Dublin" | Gwennyn | 03:33 |
| 22 | "Ar soudarded 'zo gwisket e ruz" | Rozenn Talec, Gilles Servat | 03:42 |
| 23 | Prelude to "Sein 1940" | Olivier de Kersauson | 00:31 |
| 24 | "Sein 1940" | Tri Yann, Louis Capart | 03:24 |
| 25 | "Portsall" | Didier Barbelivien | 02:42 |
| 26 | "Tonnerre de Brest" | Olivier de Kersauson | 01:07 |
| 27 | "Brest" | Miossec, Jane Birkin | 03:01 |
| 28 | "Gavotte des montagnes" | instrumental (couple of sonneurs) | 01:50 |

== Credits ==
- Patrice Marzin, Soïg Sibéril, Jacques Pellen, Michel-Yves Kochmann, Philippe Russo, Sébastien Chouard – guitars
- Ronan Le Bars, Kevin Camus – uilleann pipes, whistles
- Robert Le Gall – violin, mandoline
- Pierre Stéphan – violin
- Yannig Noguet – diatonic button accordion
- Nikolaz Cadoret, Cécile Corbel – Celtic harp
- Jean-Claude Auclin – cello
- Franck Eulry – keyboards, arrangements, orchestration
- Sofia Symphonic Orchestra
- Stéphane Briand – recording and mixing
- Hubert Salou – mastering

== Charts ==
| Weekly chart (2017) | Peak position |
|---|---|
| French Albums (SNEP) | 15 |

| Year-end chart (2017) | Top |
|---|---|
| French Albums (SNEP) | 168 |
