= The Grape Escape =

Board game

- Publishers: Parker Brothers
- Players: 2–4
- Setup time: 3-7 minutes
- Playing time: 15 minutes
- Chance: High (die rolling)
- Age range: 5+

The Grape Escape is a board game released in 1992 by Parker Brothers (now Hasbro) and licensed by Rehtmeyer Inc. The game was intended to entertain younger audiences of 5+ years old. In 2010, Hasbro released a game called Smashed Potatoes with the same game play, but with potatoes instead of grapes. However, Smashed Potatoes was eventually discontinued.

The game consisted of playing pieces constructed of various colored Grape Goop (Play-Doh) that were fashioned after grape-like action figures. Game play consisted of maneuvering clay playing pieces through several plastic obstacles on a board that were aimed to physically disfigure or decapitate the playing piece; destroying the Grape Goop figure often resulted in losing the game, but sometimes resulted in the affected player re-molding their Grape Goop figure using one of the included grape mold templates and returning to the start space. The obstacles included crank/rubber-band-operated scissors, a steam roller, a large saw blade, and a grape stomping boot activated by lever and rubber band. (In Smashed Potatoes, the grape stomping boot was replaced with a french fryer.)

== Game play ==
Each player rolls the die in turn. (In Smashed Potatoes, the die was replaced with a spinner.) They then move their grape the number of spaces indicated on a factory conveyor belt style board. The hazard stations are counted as a place as well. The Grape Leap roll allows the player to jump ahead one space of the grape in the lead. If a player rolls Turn Crank they can operate the apparatus and take out any grape on one of the four stations (in which case, the affected player must re-mold his or her grape piece and start over). Should a player land on the same place as an opponent's grape, that grape is pushed to the next hazard station. The first grape to reach the finish wins.

== Advertising ==
The Grape Escape was advertised primarily through television commercials aired during children's television programs. The commercials consisted of animated claymation figures being crushed or sliced while children played the game. The theme song was set to the tune of the Neapolitan song "Funiculì, Funiculà".

== Remake ==
A new version of The Grape Escape was released on January 1, 2022. It is mechanically much simpler than the original, as the hazards are all operated individually rather than interlinked by gears and rubber bands. Three of the four hazards have also been replaced, with only the stomping boot returning.
