= Peppino Turco =

Italian songwriter

Giuseppe "Peppino" Turco (7 March 1846 – 14 October 1903) was an Italian songwriter.

Turco was born in Naples. Initially he was a renowned journalist and poet, collaborating with the satirical newspaper Capitan Fracassa in Rome and various Neapolitan periodicals. However it is for his verses put to music that he is best known.

== Funiculì, Funiculà ==
Turco lived in Rome for much of his life, but frequented the thermal baths at Castellammare di Stabia every summer. In 1880 it was there that he collaborated with Luigi Denza to write the verses for "Funiculì, Funiculà". The song became a huge international success and sold over one million copies, representing for many the birth of the modern Neapolitan song. He died in his home town of Naples.

== Other songs ==
Turco also wrote the verses to lesser known songs:

- 'O telefono
- Uocchie nire
- Taranti, tarantella
- Capille nire
- Vocca ‘e rosa
