= Funiculì, Funiculà =

1880 song composed by Luigi Denza

- PDF of the original sheet music of Funiculì, Funiculà, published in 1880 by Ricordi

Song
- Language: Neapolitan
- Written: 1880
- Published: 1880
- Genre: Canzone Napoletana
- Composer: Luigi Denza
- Lyricist: Peppino Turco

"Funiculì, Funiculà" (Neapolitan: [funikuˈli funikuˈla]) is a traditional Neapolitan song, composed in 1880 by Luigi Denza, with lyrics by Peppino Turco, to commemorate the opening of the first funicular railway on Mount Vesuvius. It was presented by Turco and Denza at the Piedigrotta festival the same year. The sheet music was published by Ricordi and sold over a million copies within a year. Since its publication, it has been widely adapted and recorded.

== History ==
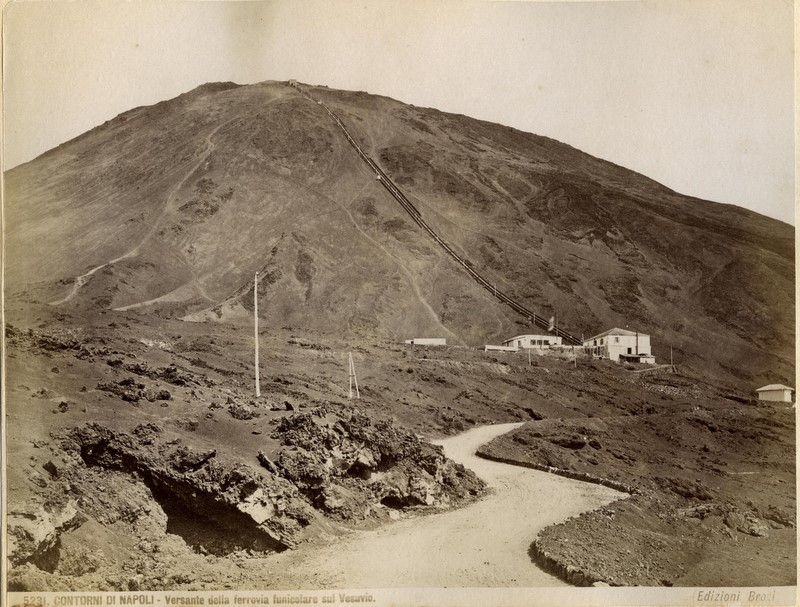
Mount Vesuvius funicular in the 19th century

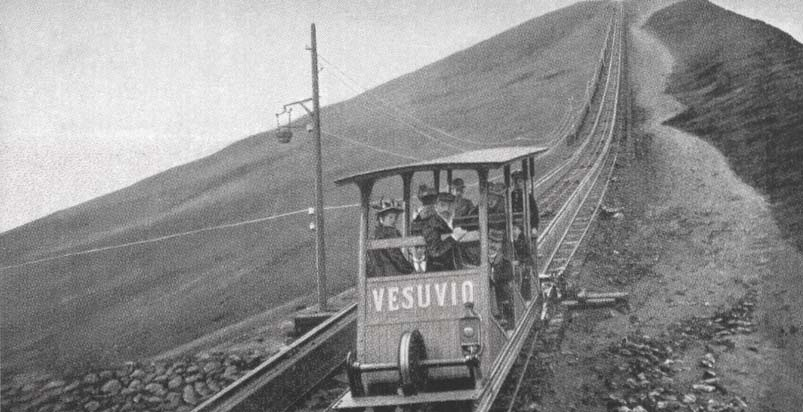
The "Vesuvio" carriage of the Mount Vesuvius funicular. The tracks can be seen extending to the top

"Funiculì, Funiculà" was composed in 1880 by Luigi Denza in his hometown of Castellammare di Stabia with lyrics contributed by journalist Peppino Turco. It was Turco who prompted Denza to compose it, perhaps as a joke, to commemorate the opening of the first funicular on Mount Vesuvius in that year. (Note: The funicular was later destroyed by the eruption of Vesuvius in 1944.) The song was sung for the first time in the Quisisana Hotel (Note: According to one source, Denza was the son of the proprietor of the Quisisana Hotel.) in Castellammare di Stabia. It was presented by Turco and Denza at the Piedigrotta festival during the same year and became immensely popular in Italy and abroad. Published by Casa Ricordi, the sheet music sold over a million copies in a year.

Over the years the song has been performed by many artists including Joseph Schmidt (who sang it in Italian), Erna Sack, Anna German, Mario Lanza, Beniamino Gigli, The Mills Brothers, Connie Francis, Haruomi Hosono (with lyrics translated into Japanese), Fischer-Chöre (with lyrics translated into German), the Grateful Dead, Luciano Pavarotti, Andrea Bocelli, Rodney Dangerfield, Alvin and the Chipmunks, The Wiggles, Larry Groce, VeggieTales, and Il Volo. In 1960, Robert B. and Richard M. Sherman wrote a new set of English lyrics to the melody of "Funiculì, Funiculà" with the title "Dream Boy". Annette Funicello included the song on her album of Italian songs titled Italiannette and also released it as a single that became a minor hit.

== Adaptations and unintentional copyright infringement ==
Music publishers Spear & Dehnhoff of New York City published sheet music for a song titled "Tra-la-la-lee" in 1884, subtitled "A popular dancing song, adapted and arranged by W. T. Harris." It contains English lyrics set to Denza's "Funiculì, Funiculà" melody, and contains no attribution to Denza.

German composer Richard Strauss heard the song while on a tour of Italy six years after it was written. He thought that it was a traditional Neapolitan folk song and incorporated it into his Aus Italien tone poem. Denza filed a lawsuit against him and won, and Strauss was forced to pay him a royalty fee. Russian composer Nikolai Rimsky-Korsakov also mistook "Funiculì, Funiculà" for a traditional folk song and used it in his 1907 "Neapolitanskaya pesenka" (Neapolitan Song).

Cornettist Herman Bellstedt used it as the basis for a theme and variations titled Napoli; a transcription for euphonium is also popular among many performers. Modernist composer Arnold Schoenberg arranged a version for the ensemble in 1921.

Since Denza died in 1922, the song has been in the public domain since 1 January 1993.

== Lyrics ==
"Funiculì, Funiculà"
Sung by tenor Francesco Daddi with piano accompaniment, 1906

MIDI rendition

=== Original Neapolitan lyrics ===
In Turco's original lyrics, a young man compares his sweetheart to a volcano, and invites her to join him in a romantic trip to the summit.

Neapolitan lyrics
Aissera, Nanniné, me ne sagliette,
tu saje addò? (Tu saje addò?)
Addò 'sto core 'ngrato cchiù dispietto,
farme nun pò! (Farme nun pò!)
Addó lo fuoco coce, ma se fuje,
te lassa sta! (Te lassa sta!)
E nun te corre appriesso, nun te struje,
sulo a guardà! (Sulo a guardà!)

(Coro)
Jamme, jamme 'ncoppa, jamme jà,
Jamme, jamme 'ncoppa, jamme jà,
funiculì, funiculà, funiculì, funiculà,
'ncoppa, jamme jà, funiculì, funiculà!

Né, jamme da la terra a la montagna,
nu passo nc'è! (Nu passo nc'è!)
Se vède Francia, Proceta e la Spagna...
Io veco a tte! (Io veco a tte!)
Tirato co la fune, ditto 'nfatto,
'ncielo se va! ('ncielo se va!)
Se va comm' 'a lo viento a l'intrasatto,
guè, saglie, sà! (Guè, saglie, sà!)

(Coro)

Se n'è sagliuta, oje né, se n'è sagliuta,
la capa già! (La capa già!)
È gghiuta, po' è turnata, po' è venuta,
sta sempe ccà! (Sta sempe ccà!)
La capa vota, vota, attuorno, attuorno,
attuorno a tte! (Attuorno a tte!)
'Sto core canta sempe nu taluorno:
Sposamme, oje né! (Sposamme, oje né!)

(Coro)

Translation:

English translation
I climbed up high yesterday evening, oh, Nannina,
Do you know where? (Do you know where?)
Where this ungrateful heart
No longer pains me! (No longer pains me!)
Where fire burns, but if you run away,
It lets you be! (It lets you be!)
It doesn't follow after or torment you,
just with a look! (Just with a look!)

(Chorus)
Let's go, let's go! To the top we'll go!
Let's go, let's go! To the top we'll go!
Funicular up, funicular down, funicular up, funicular down!
To the top we'll go, funicular up, funicular down!

Let's go from here below up to the mountain,
A step away! A step away!
You can see France, Procida, and Spain,
and I see you! (And I see you!)
You rise, pulled by a cable, quick as a wink,
into the sky! (Into the sky!)
We'll rise up like a whirlwind all of a sudden
knows how to do! (Knows how to do!)

(Chorus)

The car has climbed up high, see, climbed up high now,
right to the top! (Right to the top!)
It went, and turned around, and came back down,
it's always there! (It's always there!)
The top is turning round, and round, and round,
around yourself! (Around yourself!)
My heart is singing the same refrain:
We should be wed! (We should be wed!)

(Chorus)

=== Modern Italian lyrics (sung by Joseph Schmidt) ===
Stasera, Nina mia, io son' montato
Te lo dirò? (Te lo dirò?)
Colà, dove dispetti un cor ingrato
Più far non può! (Più far non può!)
Colà, cocente è il foco, ma, se fuggi,
Ti lascia star, (Ti lascia star,)
E non ti corre appresso e non ti struggi
A riguardar. (A riguardar.)

(Coro)
Lesti! Lesti! Via, montiam su là!
Lesti! Lesti! Via, montiam su là!
Funiculì, funiculà, funiculì, funiculà!
Via, montiam su là! Funiculì, funiculà!

Montiamo-dalla terra alla montagna
Un passo c'è; (Un passo c'è;)
Si vede Francia, Procida, la Spagna
E io veggo te! (E io veggo te!)
Tirate con le funi - è detto fatto
In ciel si va, (In ciel si va,)
Si va siccome il vento, a volo, a scatto
E siam già la! (E siam già la!)

(Coro)

Ell'è montata, il sai, lassù montata
La testa è già, (La testa è già,)
È andata sino in cima e poi tornata
È sempre qua! (È sempre qua!)
La testa gira, gira, intorno, intorno,
Intorno a te, (Intorno a te,)
E il core canta, come il primo giorno,
Ti sposa a me! (Ti sposa a me!)

(Coro)

=== Traditional English lyrics ===
"Funiculi, Funicula (A Merry Life)" (1921)
A 1921 recording of the English version of Funiculì, Funiculà (A Merry Life) by Richard Bonelli for Brunswick Records.

Edward Oxenford, a lyricist and translator of librettos, wrote lyrics, with scant relationship to those of the original version, that became traditional in English-speaking countries. His version of the song often appears with the title "A Merry Life".

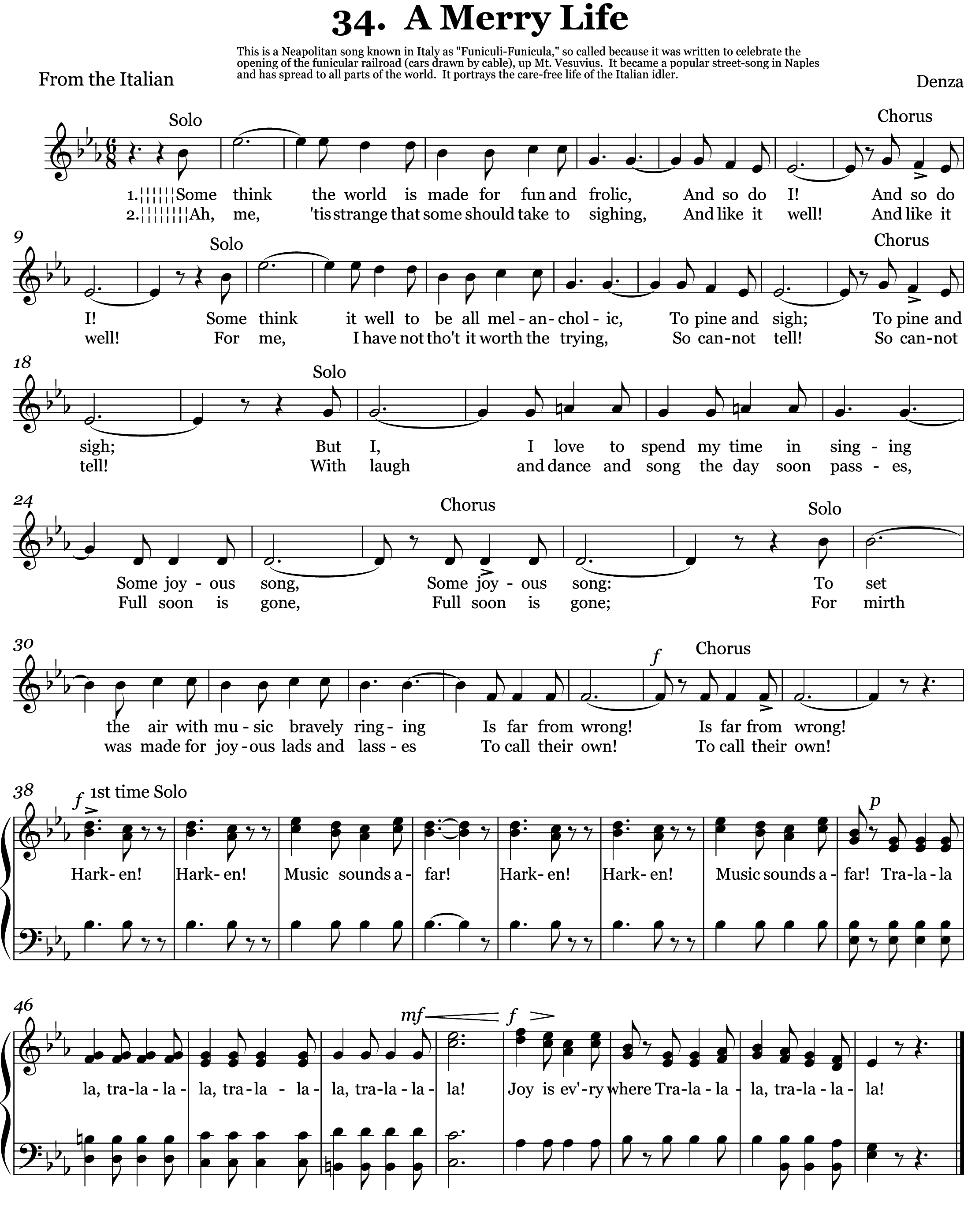
"A Merry Life" sheet music

Some think the world is made for fun and frolic,
And so do I! And so do I!
Some think it well to be all melancholic,
To pine and sigh; to pine and sigh;
But I, I love to spend my time in singing,
Some joyous song, some joyous song,
To set the air with music bravely ringing
Is far from wrong! Is far from wrong!
Listen, listen, echoes sound afar!
Listen, listen, echoes sound afar!
Funiculì, funiculà, funiculì, funiculà!
Echoes sound afar, funiculì, funiculà!

Some think it wrong to set the feet a-dancing,
But not so I! But not so I!
Some think that eyes should keep from coyly glancing,
Upon the sly! Upon the sly!
But, oh! To me the mazy dance is charming,
Divinely sweet! Divinely sweet!
And surely there is naught that is alarming
In nimble feet! In nimble feet!
Listen, listen, echoes sound afar!
Listen, listen, echoes sound afar!
Funiculì, funiculà, funiculì, funiculà!
Echoes sound afar, funiculì, funiculà!

Ah me! 'tis strange that some should take to sighing,
And like it well! And like it well!
For me, I have not thought it worth the trying,
So cannot tell! So cannot tell!
With laugh, with dance and song the day soon passes
Full soon is gone, full soon is gone,
For mirth was made for joyous lads and lasses
To call their own! To call their own!
Listen, listen, hark the soft guitar!
Listen, listen, hark the soft guitar!
Funiculì, funiculà, funiculì, funiculà!
Hark the soft guitar, funiculì, funiculà!

== In popular culture ==
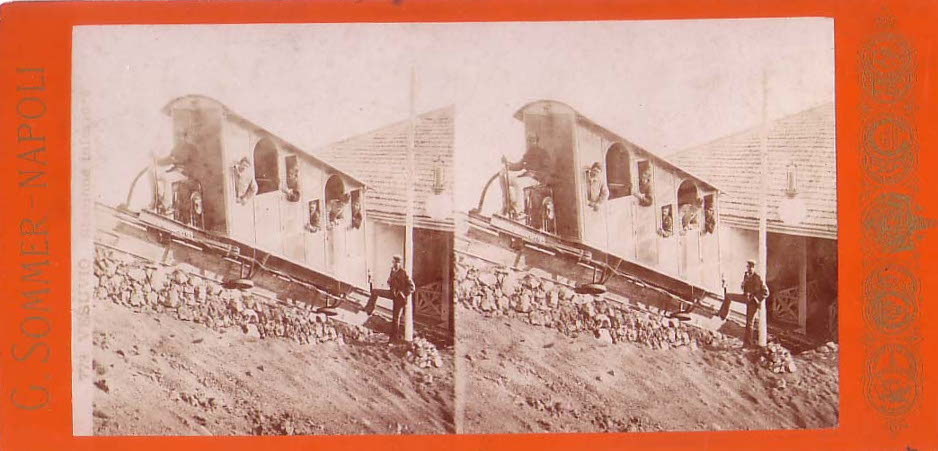
A stereogram of the lower station of the Vesuvius funicular, some time between 1880 and 1900

- In 1933, Arthur Fields and Fred Hall published a parody of "Funiculì, funiculà" titled "My High Silk Hat". This parody has been republished several times, including in the 1957 Gilwell Camp Fire Book.
- In the 1947 film Fun and Fancy Free, the tune of "Funiculì, Funiculà" is adapted into the song "Eat Until I Die".
- In 1960, the song was referenced in "The Flintstone Flyer", the first episode of the animated sitcom The Flintstones.
- In 1961, the song was referenced in The Andy Griffith Show episode "Barney on the Rebound", where the character Barney Fife suggests playing the song for a young lady who shows interest in Barney. Barney then plays a few notes from the song.
- In 1966, comedian Christine Nelson wrote and recorded a parody of the song with lyrics inspired by the English version, titled "Marvin". Nelson portrays the aggrieved mother of a constantly misbehaving son. It was produced by Lou Busch and released on Nelson's Reprise Records album Did'ja Come To Play Cards Or To Talk?
- Between 1977 and 1989, the song was performed more than 20 times by Grateful Dead during tunings. A brief recording opens their live album Dick's Picks Volume 3.
- A rendition of the song with Japanese lyrics appears on Haruomi Hosono's 1982 solo album Philharmony.
- In the 1983 film Easy Money, Rodney Dangerfield sings an English version of the song.
- In 1991, Franciscus Henri released a parody of the song for the album Dancing in the Kitchen, titled Pizza Song. Likely due to this, the song has become associated with pizza and is frequently played in pizzerias.
- In 1992, Parker Brothers released the board game The Grape Escape; the TV commercial for the product uses the melody of "Funiculi, Funiculà" with new lyrics that describe the mechanics of the game.
- The 1996 film The Adventures of Pinocchio has a rendition of the song with differing lyrics performed by Jerry Hadley. The soundtrack album lists it as "Luigi's Welcome".
- The song is the anthem of Anzio High School, a school from the Girls und Panzer franchise, in the 2014 Japanese OVA Girls und Panzer: This Is the Real Anzio Battle!. The song was included in the third drama CD of Girls und Panzer, which released in Japan in August 2024.
- The melody is played in a VeggieTales segment called "Larry's High Silk Hat".
- In the 2004 video game Spider-Man 2, "Funiculì, Funiculà" is used as the soundtrack in the pizza delivery minigame.
- The 2023 video game Pizza Tower uses a variation of "Funiculì, Funiculà" during its tutorial.
- In 2026, the 38th chapter of the manga The JoJoLands, portrays the main characters dancing and singing to the song.

== See also ==
- Tarantella Napoletana – another Neapolitan song stereotypically used to represent Italy
- Ar soudarded 'zo gwisket e ruz – song in the Breton language, composed the same year
- List of train songs
