= Antonio Piaggio =

Italian priest and scholar (1713–1796/7)

Padre Antonio Piaggio
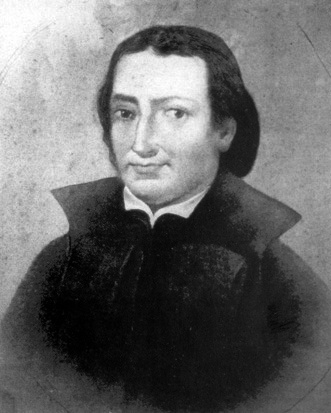
- Born: 1713; Genoa
- Died: 1796/97; Naples
- Patrons: Sir William Hamilton

Padre Antonio Piaggio (1713 – ca. 1796/7) was an Italian priest and scholar, who invented a machine to unroll carbonized scrolls from Herculaneum in the 1750s, and spent the years 1779-1795 recording the activity of Vesuvius in a diary, for Sir William Hamilton.

== Herculaneum papyri ==
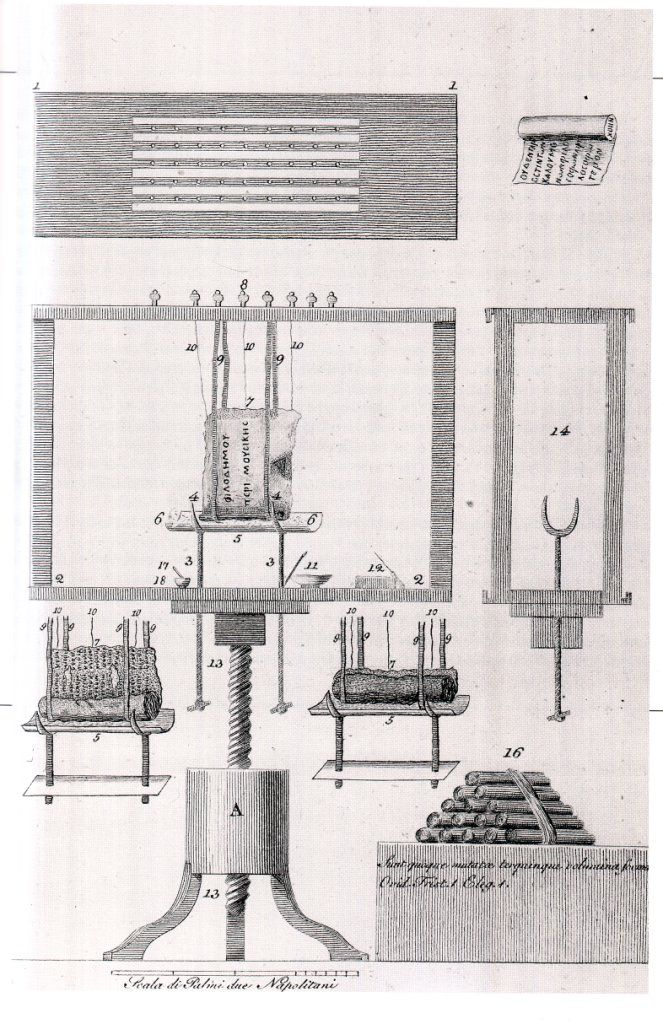
Piaggio's machine for unrolling papyri.

In 1752, the Villa of the Papyri was discovered in the city of Herculaneum, having been buried during the AD 79 eruption of Vesuvius. The rolled papyri scrolls had been carbonised and then preserved by the hot volcanic deposits, and many efforts were made to try and unroll and decipher them. Piaggio, who was a priest and curator of manuscripts in the Vatican, was brought to Naples to assist, and invented a simple machine to unroll the manuscripts using silk threads attached to the edge of the papyrus. The unrolling was partially successful, but proved to be rather destructive for the fragile scrolls, yet vastly improving on the prevailing practice of eviscerating or scraping the scrolls.

== Vesuvius ==
From September 1779 to August 1795, Piaggio kept a series of diaries for Sir William Hamilton, in which he recorded daily observations and sketches of Vesuvius, which he could see from his residence at Madonna Pugliano near Resina, on the western side of Vesuvius and the Bay of Naples. These diaries were presented by Hamilton to Sir Joseph Banks, and then presented by Lady Dorothea Banks to the Royal Society in 1805. The diaries remain in the Royal Society archives today.

== Sketches and engravings ==
One of Piaggio's sketches of the 1779 eruption of Vesuvius was used by Hamilton as the basis for an illustration in the lavish book 'Campi Phlegraei'; and a number of Piaggio's engravings remain in circulation. Hamilton used another of Piaggio's illustrations in a paper describing the 1794 eruption of Vesuvius. The caption records that Piaggio drew the sketch from Resina during the force of the eruption, but that the proximity to the activity meant that it was incomplete since Piaggio's friends had had to rescue him in the midst of a shower of cinders and sulphureous ashes.

The British Museum holds a drawing by Giovanni Benedetto Castiglione that was once from Piaggio's collections.
