= Luigi Denza =

Italian composer

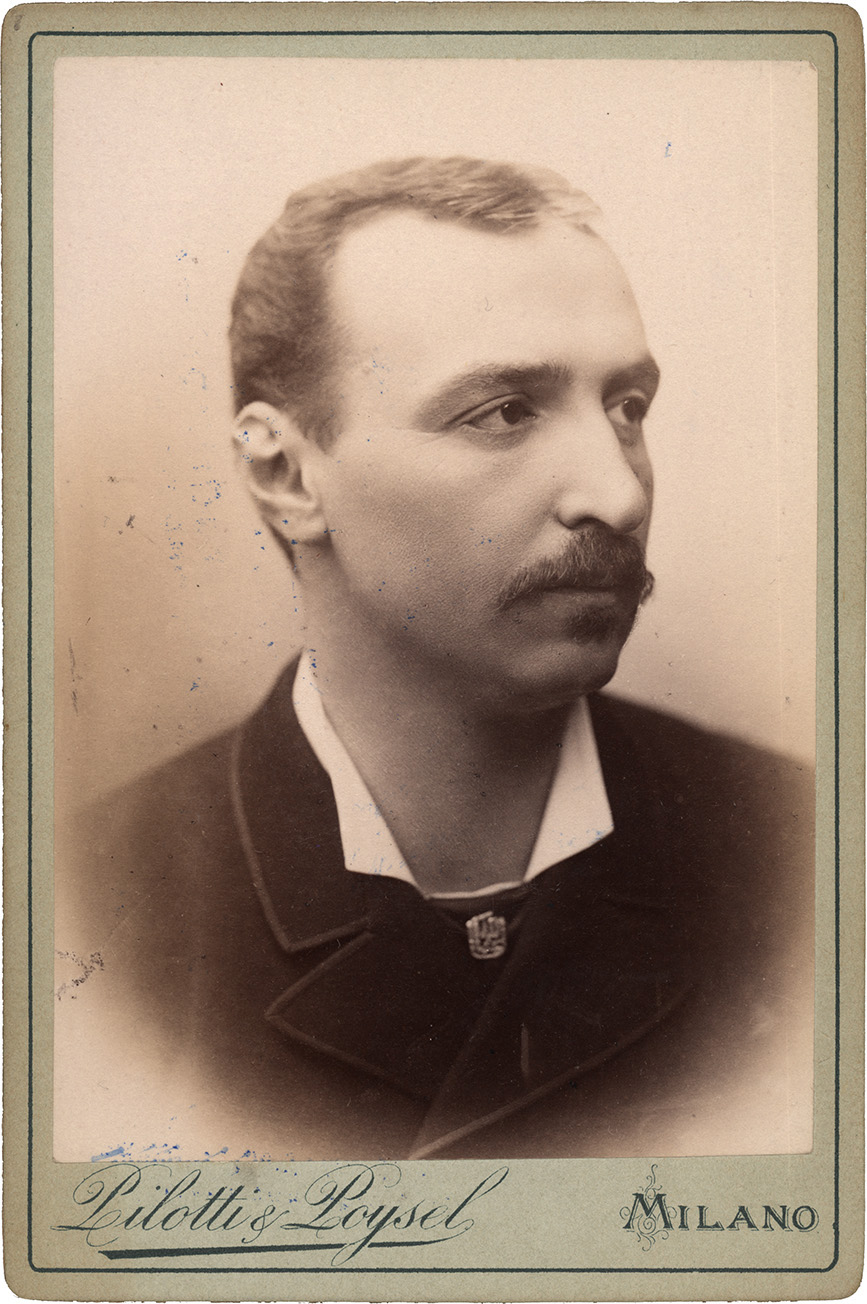
A portrait of Luigi Denza

Luigi Denza (24 February 1846 – 27 January 1922) was an Italian composer.

== Career ==
Denza was born at Castellammare di Stabia, near Naples. He studied music with Saverio Mercadante and Paolo Serrao at the Naples Conservatory. In 1884, he moved to London, taught singing privately and became a professor of singing at the Royal Academy of Music in 1898, where he taught for two decades. He died in London in 1922.

== Funiculì, Funiculà ==
Denza is best remembered for "Funiculì, Funiculà" (1880), a humorous Neapolitan song inspired by the inauguration of a funicular to the summit of Vesuvius. Neapolitan journalist Peppino Turco contributed the lyrics and may have prompted the song by suggesting that Denza compose something for the Piedigrotta song-writing competition. "Funiculì, Funiculà" was published the same year by Ricordi and within a year had sold a million copies. (Note: Six years after its publication, German composer Richard Strauss took "Funiculì, Funiculà" for a traditional Neapolitan folk song and incorporated it into his tone poem Aus Italien as "Neapolitanisches Volksleben". Rimsky-Korsakov made a similar assumption and arranged it as "Neapolitan Song".)

== Other music ==
Occhi di fata (1:39)
Piece by Luigi Denza performed prior to 1917, by Mattia Battistini

Amami (3:42)
Piece by Luigi Denza sung in 1929 by Francisca Pomar de Maristany

In addition to "Funiculì, Funiculà", Denza composed hundreds of popular songs. Some of them, such as "Luna fedel", "Occhi di fata", and "Se", have been sung by Enrico Caruso, Mario Lanza, Carlo Bergonzi, Luciano Pavarotti, and Ronan Tynan. He was also an able mandolinist and guitarist, and for those instruments he wrote "Ricordo di Quisisana", "Come to me", "Nocturne", and several others. Denza also wrote an opera, Wallenstein (1876). (Note: Based on Schiller's play.)

== Judging of James Joyce ==
Besides writing songs and music, part of Denza's enduring legacy was his judging of James Joyce, who was a singer before he became a recognized novelist.

When Denza was Professor of Music at the London Academy of Music, he was asked to judge the 1904 Feis Ceoil Irish Singing Contest, a prototype of today's musical reality shows. On 16 May 1904, Denza attempted to mentor Joyce, and would have awarded him the Gold Medal, but Joyce could not sight read, missing a crucial part of the competition; Denza instead awarded Joyce the third-place Bronze medal. Disgusted, Joyce gave the medal to his Aunt Josephine; the medal ended up years later being bought by Michael Flatley at an auction.
