= Ar soudarded 'zo gwisket e ruz =

"Ar soudarded 'zo gwisket e ruz" (Breton pronunciation: [aʁ zudaʁdɛd zo gɥiskɛd e ʁy], "The soldiers are dressed in red") is a Breton song written around 1880 by Max Ar Fur about his relative who died in the Franco-Prussian War. The song was made prominent in the 1970s by the songwriter's grandson, Gweltaz Ar Fur and was then picked up by various artists (Soazig Kermabon for her 1980 album Chant et harpe celtique, Gilles Servat, Zoltán Arany and others). The song is also included in the 2017 compilation album Breizh eo ma bro!

== Composition ==
The song's lyrics are written in the Gwenedeg dialect of Breton language and feature a soldier named Ar Fur ("soudard Ar Fur, Ar Fur e oa") who asks to be buried in the village of Brizak (Brizeux, now part of Vannes) if he dies at war. Gweltaz ar Fur sang the song entirely in his Hennebont dialect, but later the song was also performed in standard Breton. The music is composed in the minor key and 3/4 time signature.

== See also ==
- Breton music
