= Adriano Tilgher (philosopher) =

Italian philosopher and essayist

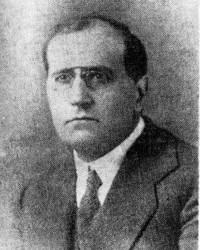
Adriano Tilgher

Adriano Tilgher (8 January 1887 – 3 November 1941) was an Italian philosopher and essayist.

== Biography ==
Tilgher was born in Resina (now Ercolano, Campania).

After studying law, he dedicated himself to journalism and essay writing. He was a theatre critic for various daily Roman newspapers between 1915 and 1925, proving himself a sharp interpreter of dramatic texts. He is known for his view of the theatre of Luigi Pirandello, which he interpreted as an expression of the contrast between Life (la Vita) and Form (la Forma), a view Pirandello adopted as his own. A surviving newspaper review by Tilgher is held in Yale University's Beinecke Rare Book and Manuscript Library.

He wrote the book "Storia del concetto di lavoro nella civiltà occidentale (homo faber)", Rome 1924 (reprinted) 1944 and Bologna 1983; English translation (by Dorothy Canfield Fisher); "Work, what it has meant to men through the ages", New York 1931 (reprinted 1958, 1977, as "Homo faber; work through the ages").

He died in Rome in 1941.

== Works ==
- Relativisti contemporanei (1923), Rome: Libreria di scienze e lettere
