= List of Specialist Classical Albums Chart number ones of the 2010s =

This is a list of the number-one albums of the Specialist Classical Albums Chart during the 2010s.

== Number ones ==
Artist (Note: The artist, album, date of reaching number one and number of weeks at number one are those given by the Official Charts Company.)	Album	Record label (Note: The record labels are those given by the Official Charts Company.)	Reached number one	Weeks at number one
2010
André Rieu	Forever Vienna	Decca	3 January 2010	42
Eric Whitacre	Light & Gold	Decca	24 October 2010	2
André Rieu	Forever Vienna	Decca	7 November 2010	1
Benedictine Nuns of Notre-Dame	Voices – Chant From Avignon	Decca	14 November 2010	3
André Rieu	Forever Vienna	Decca	5 December 2010	14
2011
I Fagiolini/Robert Hollingworth	Striggio Mass in 40 Parts	Decca	13 March 2011	3
André Rieu	Forever Vienna	Decca	3 April 2011	2
Miloš Karadaglić	The Guitar	Deutsche Grammophon	17 April 2011	15
Joseph Calleja	The Maltese Tenor	Decca	31 July 2011	1
Miloš Karadaglić	The Guitar	Deutsche Grammophon	7 August 2011	5
Lang Lang	Liszt – My Piano Hero	Sony Classical	11 September 2011	4
Nicola Benedetti	Italia	Decca	9 October 2011	3
Lang Lang	Liszt – My Piano Hero	Sony Classical	30 October 2011	1
Riccardo Chailly/Leipzig Gewandhaus Orchestra	Beethoven: The Symphonies	Decca	6 November 2011	1
Angela Gheorghiu	Homage to Maria Callas	EMI Classics	13 November 2011	1
Paul Mealor	A Tender Light	Decca	20 November 2011	5
Miloš Karadaglić	The Guitar	Deutsche Grammophon	25 December 2011	3
2012
Alison Balsom	Seraph	EMI Classics	15 January 2012	1
City of Birmingham Symphony Orchestra/Mike Seal	Anthony Hopkins: Composer	Classic FM	22 January 2012	1
Paul Mealor	A Tender Light	Decca	29 January 2012	1
City of Birmingham Symphony Orchestra/Mike Seal	Anthony Hopkins: Composer	Classic FM	5 February 2012	4
Isabelle Faust/Orchestra Mozart/Claudio Abbado	Berg / Beethoven: Violin Concertos	Harmonia Mundi	4 March 2012	2
David Garrett	Legacy	Decca	18 March 2012	2
Karl Jenkins/Lucy Crowe/Chloë Hanslip/London Symphony Orchestra	The Peacemakers	EMI Classics	1 April 2012	5
Charlie Siem/City of Prague Philharmonic Orchestra/Paul Englishby	Banks: Six Pieces for Orchestra	Naxos	6 May 2012	2
Monteverdi Choir/John Eliot Gardiner	Bach: Motets	Soli Deo Gloria	20 May 2012	1
Berliner Philharmoniker/Simon Rattle	Bruckner: Symphony No. 9	EMI Classics	27 May 2012	1
Karl Jenkins/Lucy Crowe/Chloë Hanslip/London Symphony Orchestra	The Peacemakers	EMI Classics	3 June 2012	1
I Fagiolini/Robert Hollingworth	1612 Italian Vespers	Decca	10 June 2012	1
Miloš Karadaglić	Latino	Deutsche Grammophon	17 June 2012	6
West-Eastern Divan/Daniel Barenboim	Beethoven for All – Music of Power, Passion & Beauty	Decca	29 July 2012	3
Benjamin Grosvenor	Rhapsody in Blue	Decca	19 August 2012	1
Miloš Karadaglić	Latino	Deutsche Grammophon	26 August 2012	1
Nicola Benedetti	The Silver Violin	Decca	2 September 2012	7
Friar Allesandro	Voice From Assisi	Decca	21 October 2012	4
Lang Lang	The Chopin Album	Sony Classical	18 November 2012	1
Friar Allesandro	Voice From Assisi	Decca	25 November 2012	1
John Rutter/Catrin Finch	Blessing	Deutsche Grammophon	2 December 2012	1
Nicola Benedetti	The Silver Violin	Decca	9 December 2012	6
2013
Vienna Philharmonic/Franz Welser-Möst	New Year's Concert 2013	Sony Classical	20 January 2013	1
Nicola Benedetti	The Silver Violin	Decca	27 January 2013	2
The King's Consort	I Was Glad – Music of Stanford & Parry	Vivat	10 February 2013	1
Jonas Kaufmann/Orchester der Deutschen Oper Berlin	Wagner	Decca	17 February 2013	1
Alisa Weilerstein/Daniel Barenboim	Elgar/Carter: Cello Concertos	Decca	24 February 2013	1
Jonas Kaufmann/Orchester der Deutschen Oper Berlin	Wagner	Decca	3 March 2013	3
Dunedin Consort/John Butt	J.S. Bach: John Passion	Linn	24 March 2013	2
Monteverdi Choir/John Eliot Gardiner	Bach: Cantatas Ascension Day	Soli Deo Gloria	7 April 2013	1
Berliner Philharmoniker/Simon Rattle	Stravinsky: Le Sacre du Printemps	EMI Classics	14 April 2013	1
Julia Lezhneva/Il Giardino Armonico	Alleluia	Decca	21 April 2013	1
Jonas Kaufmann/Orchester der Deutschen Oper Berlin	Wagner	Decca	28 April 2013	1
Royal Liverpool Philharmonic/Vasily Petrenko	Shostakovich: Symphony No. 7	Naxos	5 May 2013	5
Steven Osborne/BBC Scottish Symphony Orchestra/Ilan Volkov	Stravinsky: Complete Music for Piano and Orchestra	Hyperion	9 June 2013	1
Cecilia Bartoli/Orchestra La Scintilla/Giovanni Antonini	Bellini: Norma	Decca	16 June 2013	1
Orchestra Mozart/Claudio Abbado	Schumann Symphony No. 2	Deutsche Grammophon	23 June 2013	1
Budapest Festival Orchestra	Wagner: Opera Excerpts	Channel Classics	30 June 2013	1
Cédric Tiberghien/BBC Scottish Symphony Orchestra/Andrew Manze	The Romantic Piano Concerto, Vol. 60: Dubois	Hyperion	7 July 2013	1
The Sixteen/Harry Christophers	The Queen of Heaven	CORO	14 July 2013	1
Royal Concertgebouw Orchestra/Mariss Jansons	Mahler: Symphony No. 8	RCO Live	21 July 2013	1
Alison Balsom	Sound the Trumpet – Royal Music of Purcell and Handel	Warner Classics	28 July 2013	1
Daniel Hope	Spheres	Deutsche Grammophon	4 August 2013	2
Anna Netrebko	Verdi	Deutsche Grammophon	18 August 2013	1
Plácido Domingo	Verdi	Sony Classical	25 August 2013	1
Berliner Philharmoniker/Simon Rattle	Rachmaninov: Symphonic Dances; The Bells	Warner Classics	1 September 2013	1
The Sixteen/Harry Christophers	The Queen of Heaven	CORO	8 September 2013	1
Cecilia Bartoli/I Barocchisti/Diego Fasolis	Steffani: Stabat Mater	Decca	15 September 2013	1
Jonas Kaufmann	The Verdi Album	Sony Classical	22 September 2013	4
Riccardo Chailly/Leipzig Gewandhaus Orchestra	Brahms: The Symphonies	Decca	20 October 2013	1
The Sixteen/Harry Christophers	The Queen of Heaven	CORO	27 October 2013	1
Friar Alessandro	Voice of Joy	Decca	3 November 2013	1
Tallis Scholars	John Tavener/Missa Gloria Tibi Trinitas	Gimel	10 November 2013	5
Commotio/Matthew Berry	Chilcott/Rose In Winter	Naxos	15 December 2013	1
Julian Lloyd Webber and Jiaxin Cheng	A Tale of Two Cellos	Naxos	22 December 2013	1
Commotio/Matthew Berry	Chilcott/Rose In Winter	Naxos	29 December 2013	1
2014
Tallis Scholars	John Tavener/Missa Gloria Tibi Trinitas	Gimel	5 January 2014	1
Frith/Ulster Orchestra/Falletta	Moeran/In The Mountain Country	Naxos	12 January 2014	1
Vienna Philharmonic/Daniel Barenboim	New Years Concert 2014	Sony Classical	19 January 2014	1
Tenebrae/Nigel Short	Russian Treasures	Signum Classics	26 January 2014	1
Ji Liu	Piano Reflections	Classic FM	2 February 2014	3
Karadaglic/LPO/Nezet-Sequin	Aranjuez	Mercury Classics	23 February 2014	5
Patrick Hawes	Angel	Decca	30 March 2014	1
Royal Liverpool Philharmonic/Vasily Petrenko	Shostakovich/Symphony No. 14	Naxos	6 April 2014	1
Jonas Kaufmann	Schubert/Winterreise	Sony Classical	13 April 2013	1
Karadaglic/LPO/Nezet-Sequin	Aranjuez	Mercury Classics	20 April 2014	3
Polyphony/Stephen Layton	Jenkins/Motets	Deutsche Grammophon	11 May 2014	3
Staatskapelle Berlin/Barenboim	Elgar/Symphony No.2	Decca	1 June 2014	1
Polyphony/Stephen Layton	Jenkins/Motets	Deutsche Grammophon	8 June 2014	1
The Sixteen/Harry Christophers	The Voice of The Turtle Dove	CORO	15 June 2014	1
Tasmin Little/BBC Symphony OrchestraEdward Gardiner	Walton Symphony No.1 - Violin Concerto	Chandos	22 June 2014	1
Polyphony/Stephen Layton	Jenkins/Motets	Deutsche Grammophon	29 June 2014	1
Alina Ibragimova/Steven Osborne	Prokofiev/Violin Sonatas	Hyperion	6 July 2014	1
Lucerne Festival Orchestra/Claudio Abbado	Bruckner/Symphony No. 9 In D Minor	Deutsche Grammophon	13 July 2014	1
Vivica Genaux/Simone Kermes	Rival Queens	Sony Classical	20 July 2014	1
Lucerne Festival Orchestra/Claudio Abbado	Bruckner/Symphony No. 9 In D Minor	Deutsche Grammophon	27 July 2014	1
Ji Liu	Piano Reflections	Classic FM	3 August 2014	2
Benjamin Grosvenor	Dances	Decca	17 August 2014	1
Ji Liu	Piano Reflections	Classic FM	24 August 2014	2
Joyce Didonato	Stella Di Napoli	Erato	7 September 2014	1
Alison Balsom	Paris	Warner Classics	14 September 2014	3
Angela Hewitt	Bach/Art of Fudge	Hyperion	5 October 2014	3
Joyce Didonato	Stella Di Napoli	Erato	26 October 2014	1
Angela Hewitt	Bach/Art of Fudge	Hyperion	2 November 2014	2
Jeremy Irons/Roderick Williams/Davan Wetton	Williams/Flowers of the Field	Naxos	16 November 2014	1
Angela Hewitt	Bach/Art of Fudge	Hyperion	23 November 2014	1
Maki Namekawa	Glass/The Complete Piano Etudes	Orange Mountain	30 November 2014	1
King's College Choir	Favourite Carols from King's	King's College, Cambridge	7 December 2014	5
2015
Pip Eastop/Hanover Band/Anthony Halsted	Mozart/Horn Concertos	Hyperion	11 January 2015	1
Vienna Philharmonic/Zubin Mehta	New Years Concert 2015	Sony Classical	18 January 2015	1
Grigory Sokolov	The Salburg Recital	Deutsche Grammophon	25 January 2015	2
Trinity College Choir/Stephen Layton	Esenvalds/Northern Lights	Hyperion	8 February 2015	1
Jesus College Cambridge Choir	Out of Darkness	Signum Classics	15 February 2015	1
Nemanja Radulović	Journey East	Deutsche Grammophon	22 February 2015	1
Vilde Frang	Mozart/Violin Concertos Nos 1 & 5	Warner Classics	1 March 2015	1
Tallis Scholars	Part/Tintinnabuli	Gimel	8 March 2015	2
Taizé	Music of Unity and Peace	Deutsche Grammophon	22 March 2015	1
Rachel Podger	Vivaldi/Lestro Armonico	Channel Classics	29 March 2015	2
The Sixteen/Harry Christophers	Monteverdi/Vespers of 1610	CORO	12 April 2015	2
Pavel Haas Quartet	Smetana/String Quartets 1&2	Supraphon	26 April 2015	2
Stephen Hough	Grieg/Lyric Pieces	Hyperion	10 May 2015	1
Royal Liverpool Philharmonic/Vasily Petrenko	The Tchaikovsky Album	Classic FM	17 May 2015	6
Emmanuel Vass	Sonic Waves	E Vass	28 June 2015	1
Opera Holland Park	Todd/Alice's Adventures in Wonderland	Signum Classics	3 July 2015	1
Polyphony/Stephen Layton	Polyphony	Hyperion	10 July 2015	2
Pia Pajala/Turku Philharmonic Orchestra/Leif Segerstam	Sibelius:Belshazzar's Feast	Naxos	24 July 2015	1
Leif Ove Andsnes/Mahler Chamber Orchestra	The Beethoven Journey - Piano Concertos No.1-5	Sony Classical	31 July 2015	1
Andris Nelsons/Boston Symphony Orchestra	Shostakovich Under Stalin's Shadow - Symphony No. 10	Deutsche Grammophon	7 August 2015	1
Leif Ove Andsnes/Mahler Chamber Orchestra	The Beethoven Journey - Piano Concertos No.1-5	Sony Classical	14 August 2015	1
Krystian Zimerman/Simon Rattle/Berliner Philharmoniker	Lutoslawski/Piano Concerto/Symphony No 2	Deutsche Grammophon	21 August 2015	1
Andris Nelsons/Boston Symphony Orchestra	Shostakovich Under Stalin's Shadow - Symphony No. 10	Deutsche Grammophon	28 August 2015	1
James O'Donnell/Westminster Abbey Choir	Parry/I Was Glad/Coronation Te Duem	Hyperion	4 September 2015	1
The Hallé/Mark Elder	Vaughan Williams A Sea Symphony	The Hallé Concerts Society	11 September 2015	1
Jonas Kaufmann	Nessun Dorma - The Puccini Album	Sony Classical	18 September 2015	3
Antonio Pappano/Orchestra dell'Accademia Nazionale di Santa Cecilia	Verdi: Aida	Warner Classics	9 October 2015	1
Massimo Palombella/Sistine Chapel Choir	Cantate Domino - La Cappella Sistina e la musica del Papa	Deutsche Grammophon	16 October 2015	1
Jonas Kaufmann	Nessun Dorma - The Puccini Album	Sony Classical	23 October 2015	1
Leif Ove Andsnes/Mahler Chamber Orchestra	The Beethoven Journey - Piano Concertos No.1-5	Sony Classical	30 October 2015	1
Tallis Scholars/Peter Philips	Taverner: Missa Corona Spinea	Gimel	6 November 2015	1
Alina Ibragimova/Arcangelo/Jonathan Cohen	JS Bach: Violin Concertos	Hyperion	13 November 2015	1
Jonas Kaufmann	Nessun Dorma - The Puccini Album	Sony Classical	20 November 2015	1
St. Paul's Cathedral Choir/Andrew Carwood	Carols With St. Paul's Cathedral Choir	Classic FM/Decca	27 November 2015	6
2016
Jonas Kaufmann	Nessun Dorma - The Puccini Album	Sony Classical	8 January 2016	1
Mariss Jansons/Vienna Philharmonic	New Year's Concert 2016	Sony Classical	15 January 2016	2
Harry Christophers/The Sixteen	The Deers Cry	Coro	29 January 2016	1
Ji Liu	Pure Chopin	Classic FM	5 February 2016	4
Elgar & Walton	Cello Concertos	Hyperion	4 March 2016	1
Aurora Orchestra & Nicholas Collon	Introit: The Music of Gerald Finzi	Decca	11 March 2016	1
Elgar & Walton	Cello Concertos	Hyperion	18 March 2016	1
Cecilia Bernardini/Dunedin Consort/John Butt	J.S. Bach: Violin Concertos	Linn	25 March 2016	1
Staatskapelle Berlin/Daniel Barenboim	Elgar/Symphony No.1	Decca	1 April 2016	1
Stephen Hough/City of Birmingham Symphony Orchestra/Andris Nelsons	Dvorak & Schumann: Piano Concertos	Hyperion	8 April 2016	1
Yevgeny Sudbin	Scarlatti:18 Sonatas	BIS	15 April 2016	1
Paul Lewis/Swedish Radio Symphony Orchestra/Daniel Harding	Brahms: Piano Concerto No.1 op. 15	Harmonia Mundi	22 April 2016	1
Staatskapelle Berlin/Daniel Barenboim	Elgar/Symphony No.1	Decca	29 April 2016	1
Alina Ibragimova/Cédric Tiberghien	Mozart:Violin Sonatas	Hyperion	6 May 2016	1
Pumeza Matshikiza	Arias	Decca	13 May 2016	1
Harry Christophers/The Sixteen	The Deers Cry	Coro	20 May 2016	2
Andris Nelsons/Boston Symphony Orchestra	Shostakovich Under Stalin's Shadow - Symphonies Nos. 5, 8 & 9; Suite From "Hamlet" (Live)	Deutsche Grammophon	3 June 2016	1
Nikolaus Harnoncourt	Beethoven: Missa Solemnis In D Major, Op. 123	Sony Classical	10 June 2016	1
Hespèrion XXI/Jordi Savall	Granada 1013-1526 by Hesperion XXI	Alia Vox	17 June 2016	1
Damian Montagu/Stewart Prosser	In A South Downs Way	Decca	24 June 2016	1
Hebrides Ensemble	MacMillan: Since It Was the Day of Preparation	Delphian	1 July 2016	1
Nicola Benedetti	Shostakovich: Violin Concerto No.1; Glazunov: Violin Concerto	Decca	8 July 2016	4
Vänskä Osmo/Minnesota Orchestra	Sibelius: Symphonies Nos. 3, 6 & 7	BIS	5 August 2016	1
James Rutherford/Kriss Russman/BBC National Orchestra of Wales	Butterworth:Orchestral Works	BIS	12 August 2016	1
Nicola Benedetti	Shostakovich: Violin Concerto No.1; Glazunov: Violin Concerto	Decca	19 August 2016	2
Mahan Esfahani	Bach: Goldberg Variations	Deutsche Grammophon	2 September 2016	1
Anna Netrebko/Orchestra dell'Accademia Nazionale di Santa Cecilia	Verismo	Deutsche Grammophon	9 September 2016	1
Trevor Morrison/Scottish Festival Orchestra/James MacMillan	The Lost Songs of St Kilda	Decca	16 September 2016	4
Daniil Trifonov	Transcendental	Deutsche Grammophon	14 October 2016	1
Trevor Morrison/Scottish Festival Orchestra/James MacMillan	The Lost Songs of St Kilda	Decca	21 October 2016	5
Joyce Didonato	In War & Peace	Erato	25 November 2016	1
Trevor Morrison/Scottish Festival Orchestra/James MacMillan	The Lost Songs of St Kilda	Decca	2 December 2016	4
Nigel Kennedy	My World	Neue Meister	30 December 2016	1
2017
Trevor Morrison/Scottish Festival Orchestra/James MacMillan	The Lost Songs of St Kilda	Decca	6 January 2017	1
Iestyn Davies/Arcangelo Corelli/Jonathan Cohen	J.S. Bach:Cantatas 54, 82 & 170	Hyperion	13 January 2017	1
Gustavo Dudamel/Vienna Philharmonic	New Year's Concert 2017	Sony Classical	20 January 2017	1
Joyce Didonato	In War & Peace	Erato	27 January 2017	1
Amy Dickson	Glass	Sony Classical	3 February 2017	1
Iestyn Davies/Arcangelo Corelli/Jonathan Cohen	J.S. Bach:Cantatas 54, 82 & 170	Hyperion	10 February 2017	1
Trevor Morrison/Scottish Festival Orchestra/James MacMillan	The Lost Songs of St Kilda	Decca	17 February 2017	1
Mark Elder/The Hallé	For the Fallen	Halle Concerts Society	24 February 2017	1
Beatrice Rana	Bach - Goldberg Variations	Warner Classics	3 March 2017	1
Choir of The Queen's College, Oxford	A New Heaven	Signum Classics	10 March 2017	1
The Sixteen & Harry Christophers/Britten Sinfonia	James Macmillan/Stabat Mater	Coro	17 March 2017	1
Aled Jones/St Pauls Choir/Andrew Carwood	Classic FM's Pts Jubilate - 500 Years of Cathedral Music	Decca	24 March 2017	6
Robert Hollingworth/The 24/I Fagiolini	Monteverdi/The Other Vespers	Decca	11 May 2017	1
Aled Jones/St Pauls Choir/Andrew Carwood	Classic FM's Pts Jubilate - 500 Years of Cathedral Music	Decca	18 May 2017	1
Robert Hollingworth/The 24/I Fagiolini	Monteverdi/The Other Vespers	Decca	25 May 2017	1
Aled Jones/St Pauls Choir/Andrew Carwood	Classic FM's Pts Jubilate - 500 Years of Cathedral Music	Decca	1 June 2017	2
Steven Osbourne/BBC Scottish Symphony Orchestra	Ravel-Piano Concertos-Falla Nights In the Gardens of Spain	Hyperion	15 June 2017	2
Stephen Cleobury	A King of Instruments - A Voice Reborn	King's College, Cambridge	29 June 2017	1
Véronique Gens	Visions	Alpha	6 July 2017	1
Choir of Trinity College, Cambridge/Stephen Layton	Stanford/Choral Music	Hyperion	13 July 2017	1
The Sixteen & Harry Christophers	Poulenc/Mass In G/Un Soir De Neige	Coro	20 July 2017	1
Staatskapelle Berlin/Daniel Barenboim	Elgar/The Dream of Gerontis	Decca	27 July 2017	2
Cipriani Potter/Howard Shelley/Tasmanian Symphony Orchestra	Piano Concertos Nos 2 & 4	Hyperion	4 August 2017	2
Robert Hollingworth/The 24/I Fagiolini	Monteverdi/The Other Vespers	Decca	18 August 2017	2
Isabelle Faust/Freiburger Barockorchester/Pablo Heras-Casado	Mendelssohn: Violin Concerto - Symphony No. 5 & The Hebrides	Harmonia Mundi	1 September 2017	1
Steven Isserlis/Deutsche Kammerphilharmonie Bremen	Joseph Haydn/Carl Philipp Emanuel Bach/Cello Concertos	Hyperion	8 September 2017	1
Krystian Zimerman	Schubert: Piano Sonatas D 959 & 960	Deutsche Grammophon	15 September 2017	1
Jonas Kaufmann	L'Opera	Sony Classical	22 September 2017	1
Red Priest	The Baroque Bohemians Gypsy Fever From	Red Priest	29 September 2017	1
Alistair McGowan	The Piano Album	Sony Classical	6 October 2017	1
Red Priest	The Baroque Bohemians Gypsy Fever From	Red Priest	13 October 2017	1
Vasily Petrenko/Alexander Armstrong/Royal Liverpool Philharmonic	Peter and the Wolf	Warner Classics	20 October 2017	1
Boris Giltburg/Pavel Nikl/Pavel Haas Quartet	Dvorak/Quintets	Supraphon	27 October 2017	1
Krystian Zimerman	Schubert: Piano Sonatas D 959 & 960	Deutsche Grammophon	3 November 2017	1
Vasily Petrenko/Alexander Armstrong/Royal Liverpool Philharmonic	Peter and the Wolf	Warner Classics	10 November 2017	1
Cecilia Bartoli/Sol Gabetta	Dolce Duello	Decca	17 November 2017	1
Ola Gjeilo/Royal Holloway Choir	Winter Songs	Decca	24 November 2017	2
Davan Wetton/City of London Choir/Royal Philharmonic Orchestra	The Nation's Favourite Carols	Classic FM/Decca	8 December 2017	4
2018
Martyn Brabbins/BBC Scottish Symphony Orchestra	Tippett: Symphonies Nos 1 & 2	Hyperion	5 January 2018	1
Edward Gardner/Bergen Philharmonic Orchestra	Greig/Piano Concerto	Chandos	12 January 2018	1
James Rhodes	Fire on All Sides	Signum	19 January 2018	1
Voces8	Equinox	VCM	26 January 2018	1
Ji Liu	Fire & Water	Classic FM	2 February 2018	1
Joseph Calleja Valencian Community Choir	Verdi	Decca	9 February 2018	1
Murray Perahia	Beethoven/Piano Sonatas	Deutsche Grammophon	16 February 2018	1
Patrica Kopatchinskaja/Polina Leschenko	Bartok/Poulenc/Ravel/Deux	Alpha	23 February 2018	1
Murray Perahia	Beethoven/Piano Sonatas	Deutsche Grammophon	2 March 2018	1
Alan Titchmarsh, Debbie Wiseman and National Symphony Orchestra	The Glorious Garden	Classic FM	9 March 2018	7
Rachel Podger	Vivaldi: Le Quattro Stagioni (The Four Seasons)	Channel Classics	27 April 2018	3
Alan Titchmarsh, Debbie Wiseman and National Symphony Orchestra	The Glorious Garden	Classic FM	18 May 2018	1
Petra Mullejan, Gottfried Von Der Goltz	George Frideric Handel: Concerti A Due Cori	Harmonia Mundi	25 May 2018	1
Boris Giltburg, Royal Scottish Symphony Orchestra, Carlos Miguel Prieto	Rachmaninov: Piano Concerto No.3	Naxos	1 June 2018	1
Stephen Hough	Stephen Hough's Dream Album	Hyperion	8 June 2018	1
Choir of Queens College Oxford	The House of the Mind	Signum Classics	15 June 2018	1
Stephen Hough	Stephen Hough's Dream Album	Hyperion	22 June 2018	1
Alexander Chapman Campbell	Journey to Nidaros	Alexander Chapman Campbell	29 June 2018	1
BBC Singers/BBC Symphony Orchestra/John Adams	John Adams:Doctor Atomic	NoneSuch	6 July 2018	1
Andris Nelsons/Boston Symphony Orchestra	Shostakovich: Symphonies Nos. 4 & 11 "The Year 1905	Deutsche Grammophon	13 July 2018	1
Dudok Quartet Amsterdam	Solitude: Works for String Quartet	Resonus Classics	20 July 2018	1
Adrian Chandler&La Serenissima	vivaldi x2 double concertos for oboes	Avie	27 July 2018	1
Stephen Osbourne	Rachmaninov/Etudes-Tableaux	Hyperion	3 August 2018	1
Adrian Chandler&La Serenissima	vivaldi x2 double concertos for oboes	Avie	10 August 2018	1
Antonio Pappano&Saint Cecilia Orchestra	Bernstein/The 3 Symphonies	Warner Classics	17 August 2018	1
Yo-Yo Ma	Bach/Six Evolutions - Cello Suites	Sony Classical	24 August 2018	2
Kantos Chamber Choir/Royal Liverpool Philharmonic Orchestra/The Cantus Ensemble & The Studio Orchestra	Dale:Requiem for My Mother	Decca	7 September 2018	1
Yo-Yo Ma	Bach/Six Evolutions - Cello Suites	Sony Classical	14 September 2018	2
Patrick Hawes, Royal Philharmonic Orchestra & National Youth Choir of Great Britain	The Great War Symphony	Classic FM	28 September 2018	3
Igor Levit	Life	Sony Classical	25 October 2018	1
Patrick Hawes, Royal Philharmonic Orchestra & National Youth Choir of Great Britain	The Great War Symphony	Classic FM	1 November 2018	1
Roger Waters	The Soldiers Tale	Sony Classical	8 November 2018	1
Patrick Hawes, Royal Philharmonic Orchestra & National Youth Choir of Great Britain	The Great War Symphony	Classic FM	15 November 2018	1
Choir of King's College, Cambridge, David Willcocks, Philip Ledger	100 Years of Nine Lessons & Carols	King's College, Cambridge	22 November 2018	9
2019
Christian Thielemann/Vienna Philharmonic	New Year's Concert 2019	Sony Classical	24 January 2019	1
Stile Antico	In a Strange Land	Harmonia Mundi	31 January 2019	1
Maurizio Pollini	Chopin/Nocturnes/Mazurkas/Berceuse	Deutsche Grammophon	7 February 2019	1
Steven Isserlis Olli Mustonen	Shostakovich/Kabalevsky/Prokofiev/Cello	Hyperion	14 February 2019	1
Staatskapelle Weimar Kirill Karabit	Liszt/Sardanapalo/Mazeppa	Audite	21 February 2019	1
Vikingur Olafsson	Johann Sebastian Bach	Deutsche Grammophon	28 February 2019	1
Lucie Horsch and the Academy of ancient Music	Baroque Journey	Decca	7 March 2019	1
Alina Ibragimova & Cédric Tiberghien	Vierne/Franck/Violin Sonatas	Hyperion	14 March 2019	1
Royal Philharmonic Orchestra/Chamber Choir of London & Robert Ziegler	Fuller/Animal Requiem	Wistle	21 March 2019	1
Ludovico Einaudi	Seven Days Walking Day One	Decca	28 March 2019	2
Beth Gibbons/The Polish National Radio Symphony Orchestra&Krystof Penderecki	Gorecki/Symphony No 3	Domino	11 April 2019	1
Lang Lang	Piano Book	Deutsche Grammophon	18 April 2019	1
Ludovico Einaudi	Seven Days Walking Day One	Decca	25 April 2019	1
Ludovico Einaudi	Seven Days Walking Day Two	Decca	2 May 2019	1
Ludovico Einaudi	Seven Days Walking Day One	Decca	9 May 2019	3
Ludovico Einaudi	Seven Days Walking Day Three	Decca	30 May 2019	1
Ludovico Einaudi	Seven Days Walking Day One	Decca	6 June 2019	1
Lise Davidsen	Lise Davidsen	Decca	13 June 2019	1
Ludovico Einaudi	Seven Days Walking Day One	Decca	20 June 2019	2
Ludovico Einaudi	Seven Days Walking Day Four	Decca	4 July 2019	1
Ludovico Einaudi	Seven Days Walking Day One	Decca	11 July 2019	1
Isata Kanneh-Mason	Romance - The Piano Music of Clara	Decca	18 July 2019	1
Nicola Benedetti/Philadelphia Orchestra/Christian Mcelaru	Marsalis/Violin Concerto/Fiddle Dance	Decca	25 July 2019	1
Ludovico Einaudi	Seven Days Walking Day Five	Decca	1 August 2019	1
Ludovico Einaudi	Seven Days Walking Day One	Decca	8 August 2019	3
Ludovico Einaudi	Seven Days Walking Day Six	Decca	29 August 2019	2
Anne-Sophie Mutter& The Recording Arts Orchestra of Los Angeles & John Williams	Across the Stars	Deutsche Grammophon	12 September 2019	1
Vikingur Olafsson	Johann Sebastian Bach	Deutsche Grammophon	19 September 2019	1
Ludovico Einaudi	Seven Days Walking Day One	Decca	26 September 2019	1
Ludovico Einaudi	Seven Days Walking Day Seven	Decca	3 October 2019	1
Anne-Sophie Mutter& The Recording Arts Orchestra of Los Angeles & John Williams	Across the Stars	Deutsche Grammophon	10 October 2019	1
Academy of Ancient Music Orchestra, Choir of AAM and Richard Egarr	Handel: Brockes-Passion	Academy of Ancient Music	17 October 2019	1
Karl Jenkins	Miserere - Songs of Mercy & Redemption	Decca	24 October 2019	2
Ludovico Einaudi	Seven Days Walking Day One	Decca	7 November 2019	2
Gareth Malone	Music for Healing	Decca	21 November 2019	8

=== By artist ===
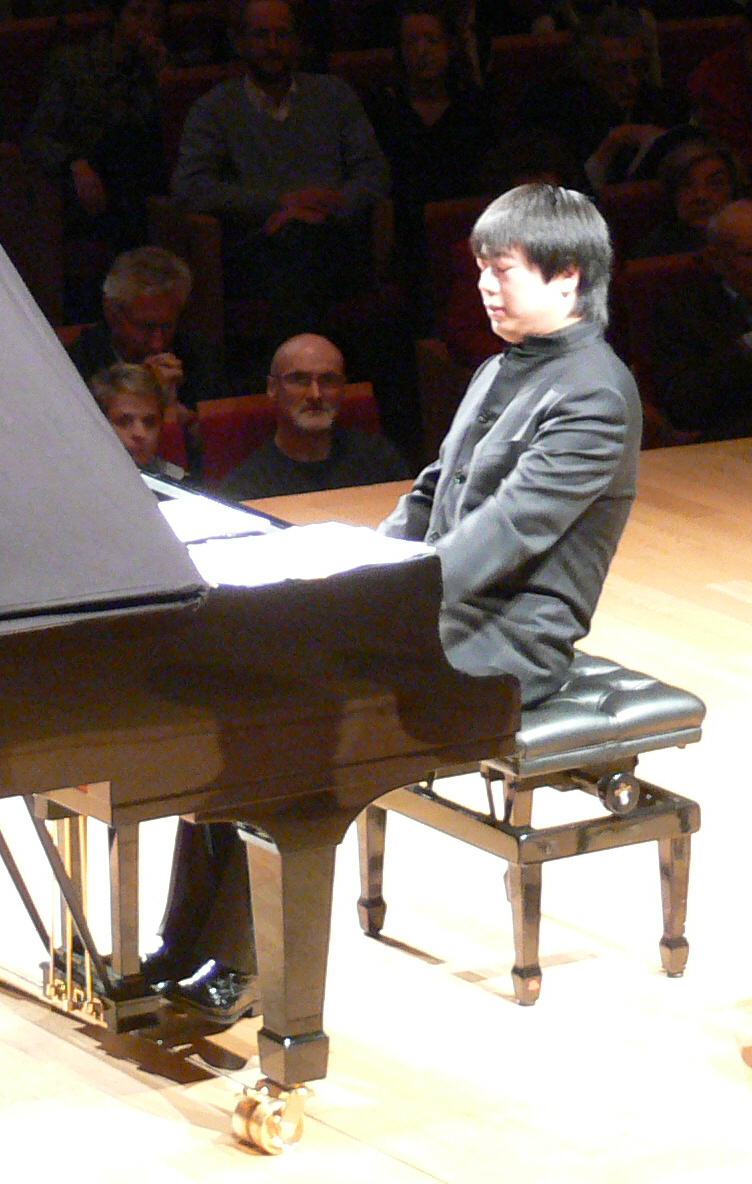
Lang Lang has spent seven weeks at number one so far this decade.

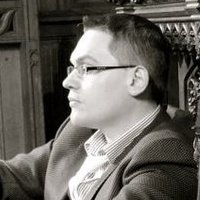
Paul Mealor topped the chart for six weeks with A Tender Light.

As of 20 December 2019, Twenty five artists have spent six or more weeks at the top of the Specialist Classical Albums Chart so far during the 2010s. The totals below include only credited performances.

Artist	Number-one albums	Weeks at number one
André Rieu	1	59
Miloš Karadaglić	2	32
Nicola Benedetti	3	25
Ludovico Einaudi	7	23
Jonas Kaufmann	5	16
Trevor Morrison	1	15
James MacMillan	1	15
Choir of King's College, Cambridge	2	14
Ji Liu	3	12
Tallis Scholars	3	9
Karadaglic	1	8
Nezet-Sequin	1	8
Stephen Layton	4	9
Harry Christophers	6	10
Andrew Carwood	1	9
Aled Jones	1	9
Paul Mealor	1	8
Vasily Petrenko	2	7
Friar Allesandro	2	6
Karl Jenkins	2	8
Alan Titchmarsh	1	8
Debbie Wiseman	1	8
Gareth Malone	1	8
Lang Lang	3	7
Angela Hewitt	1	6

=== By record label ===
As of 5 April 2019, 35 record labels have released chart-topping albums so far during the 2010s.

Record label	Number-one albums	Weeks at number one
Decca	51	209
Deutsche Grammophon	27	65
Sony Classical	20	39
Naxos	9	15
EMI Classics	5	10
Mercury Classics	1	8
Classic FM	10	45
Gimel	3	8
CORO	6	11
Harmonia Mundi	5	6
Hyperion	22	31
Linn Records	2	3
Orange Mountain	1	1
Supraphon	2	3
Warner Classics	9	12
Chandos	2	2
E Vass	1	1
RCO Live	1	1
Soli Deo Gloria	1	1
Signum Classics	6	6
Erato	2	4
Channel Classics	2	5
Halle Concerts Society	2	2
BIS	3	3
Alia Vox	1	1
Delphian	1	1
Neue Meister	1	1
King's College, Cambridge	3	15
Alpha	2	2
Red Priest	1	2
VCM	1	1
NoneSuch	1	1
Resonus Classics	1	1
Avie	1	1
Audite	1	1
Wistle	1	1
Domino	1	1

== See also ==
- List of UK Albums Chart number ones of the 2010s
