= Louise Alder =

British lyric soprano

Louise Alder MBE
- Born: London, England
- Education: University of Edinburgh; Royal College of Music
- Occupation: Soprano
- Website: https://www.louisealder.com/

Louise Alder MBE, born 25 November 1986) is a British lyric soprano. She won the Dame Joan Sutherland Audience Prize at the 2017 BBC Cardiff Singer of the World competition and the Young Singer award at the 2017 International Opera Awards. Her debut album of Strauss Lieder titled Through Life and Love with pianist Joseph Middleton, was released in July 2017 for Orchid Classics. Later recordings include the Russian Connection and Chère Nuit with Joseph Middleton for Chandos, Semele with John Eliot Gardiner and the Monteverdi Choir, Strauss Sechs Lieder Op. 68 with Robin Ticciati and the Deutsches Symphonie-Orchester Berlin for Linn Records.

== Early life ==
Louise Alder was born in London and grew up in a family of musicians, playing the violin from an early age. Her father is a singer and her mother a violinist. She was a member of the London Schools Symphony Orchestra and also danced as a child.

== Career ==
Alder was educated at Lady Margaret School in Parsons Green, Fulham, London, followed by the University of Edinburgh, graduating with First Class Honours to join the Royal College of Music's International Opera School where she was the inaugural Kiri Te Kanawa scholar.

Alder received her first career break jumping in as Sophie in Der Rosenkavalier for Glyndebourne Festival Opera at the BBC Proms in 2014, where critics noted she was 'a sparkling Sophie who won all hearts' (Barry Millington, Evening Standard) and that she 'confirmed that she's ready for top billing' (Kimon Daltas, The Arts Desk). Since then Der Rosenkavalier has become something of a calling card for her, performing it at Oper Frankfurt (2016), Welsh National Opera (2017) and Glyndebourne Festival Opera (2018).

She was a member of the solo ensemble at Oper Frankfurt 2014-2019, beginning with a jump in as Gretel in a new production of Hänsel und Gretel directed by Keith Warner and conducted by Sebastian Weigle to notable acclaim. Other highlights there included Susanna (Le Nozze di Figaro), Gilda (Rigoletto), Vixen (Cunning Little Vixen), Sophie (Werther), Sophie (Der Rosenkavalier) and Cleopatra (Giulio Cesare in Egitto). Elsewhere she has sung with Wiener Staatsoper, Bayerische Staatsoper, San Francisco Opera, Glyndebourne Festival Opera, The Royal Opera, Theater an der Wien, Opernhaus Zürich, Garsington and Welsh National Opera.

She performs recitals regularly at the Wigmore Hall with pianists Joseph Middleton, James Baillieu and Gary Matthewman and in concert halls all over the world, working with conductors such as Ivor Bolton, Sir Mark Elder, Robin Ticciati, Sebastian Weigle, Lorenzo Viotti, Jakub Hrůša, Christoph Rousset, Richard Egarr, Sir Richard Armstrong, Harry Bickett and Johannes Debus.

A passionate Handel singer, Alder sang the title role in Semele on tour with Orchestra of the Age of Enlightenment in 2017, Atalanta in a new production of Xerxes at Oper Frankfurt also in 2017, the title role in Theodora at the BBC Proms in 2018 and Romilda (Xerxes) at Oper Frankfurt in January 2019. In December 2018 she sang Gretel (Hänsel und Gretel) at Bayerische Staatsoper and in March 2019, the title role in La Calisto at Teatro Real, Madrid. Future debuts include Canadian Opera Company, English National Opera and the Royal Opera House.

Her TV appearances have included a performance of Beethoven's Fidelio at the 2017 BBC Proms on BBC 4, BBC Cardiff Singer of the World 2017, Stars von Morgen 2017 on Arte, title role in L'incoronazione di Poppea with the Academy of Ancient Music at the Enescu Festival live on Romanian TVR2, and at the Coronation Gala at Buckingham Palace in 2013 in front of her Majesty Queen Elizabeth II and the Royal Family, on BBC 1.

In 2025 Alder sang at the Last Night of the Proms. She was appointed a Member of the Order of the British Empire (MBE) in the 2026 Birthday Honours for services to music.

== Awards ==
- BBC Cardiff Singer of the World 2017 – Dame Joan Sutherland Audience Prize
- International Opera Awards 2017 – Young Singer
- Glyndebourne Festival Opera John Christie Award 2014
- Glyndebourne on Tour Donald Albert Anderson Award 2013
- Royal College of Music Tagore Gold Medal 2013
- Kathleen Ferrier Award 2013 – Second Prize
- Maggie Teyte French Song Competition 2013 – First Prize and Miriam Licette Award

== Recordings ==
- Through Life and Love, solo recital of Strauss songs with pianist Joseph Middleton, released in July 2017 by Orchid Classics.
- The Rape of Lucretia, Glyndebourne Festival Opera, DVD, Opus Arte.
- L'Orontea, Oper Frankfurt, Ivor Bolton, Oehms Classics.
- Der Graf von Luxemburg, Oper Frankfurt, Eun Sun Kim, Oehms Classics.
- The Great War Symphony,Patrick Hawes, Classic FM.
- Janáceck: Das schlaue Füchslein, Oper Frankfurt, Johannes Debus (Live)
- The Russian Connection, solo recital with Joseph Middleton, Chandos
- Handel: Semele, HWV 58 (Live), Monteverdi Choir, Sir John Eliot Gardiner
- Strauss: Tod und Verklärung, Don Juan, Sechs Lieder Op. 68, Robin Ticciati, Deutsches Symphonie-Orchester, Linn Records
- Chère Nuit, solo recital with Joseph Middleton, Chandos
- Mozart: Piano Concertos Nos. 25 & 27, Robert Levin, Academy of Ancient Music
