= Fair Albion =

Fair Albion - Visions of England

Studio album by Patrick Hawes
- Released: 2009
- Label: Signum Classics

Julian Lloyd Webber Collections chronology
Romantic Cello Concertos (2009)	Fair Albion - Visions of England (2009)

Fair Albion - Visions of England, is a 2009 album on the Signum Classics label featuring compositions by Patrick Hawes. The music ‘celebrates the heart and soul of the British Landscape’. The CD includes performances by Elin Manahan Thomas (soprano), the cellist Julian Lloyd Webber and the Royal Harpist Claire Jones.

== Track listing ==
1. The Call, Elin Manahan Thomas (soprano), The Raven Quartet
2. Reflexionem, Julian Lloyd Webber (cello) & Claire Jones (harp)
3. Ascension, Raven Quartet
4. Fair Albion, Prague Symphony Orchestra
5. A Birthday, Elin Manahan Thomas (soprano) & Claire Jones (harp)
6. Ranworth Three Broadland Preludes Patrick Hawes (piano)
7. Fenside Three Broadland Preludes Patrick Hawes (piano)
8. Remembrance Three Broadland Preludes Patrick Hawes (piano)
9. Requiem Aeternam from the Lazarus Requiem, Brno Chamber Orchestra and Chamber Choir
10. Gloriette, Julian Lloyd Webber (cello) & Patrick Hawes (piano)
11. How Hill, Claire Jones (harp)
12. Cantate Domino, Christian Forshaw, The Sanctuary Ensemble
13. After the Rain, Patrick Hawes (piano), Duke Quartet
14. The Darkling Thrush, David Stout (baritone) & Patrick Hawes (piano)
15. Quanta Qualia, Brno Chamber Orchestra
