= Nomadland (soundtrack) =

Nomadland (Original Motion Picture Soundtrack)

Soundtrack album by Ludovico Einaudi
- Released: February 19, 2021
- Recorded: 2021
- Genre: Film score
- Length: 48:25
- Label: Decca Classics
- Producer: Ludovico Einaudi

Ludovico Einaudi chronology
12 Songs from Home (2019)	Nomadland (Original Motion Picture Soundtrack) (2021)	The Father (2021)

Nomadland (Original Motion Picture Soundtrack) is the soundtrack album to the 2020 film Nomadland directed by Chloé Zhao and starring Frances McDormand. The album, released under the Decca Classics label on February 19, 2021, featured eleven tracks, containing classical compositions and excerpts from the score composed by Ludovico Einaudi. Much of the musical pieces were based on Einaudi's compositions from the box set Seven Days Walking (2019).

== Development ==
Ludovico Einaudi composed the score for Nomadland. Zhao was searching for classical music pieces inspired by nature, which led her to a YouTube video of Einaudi's composition "Elegy for the Artic" which she liked. Zhao also listened to Einaudi's box set Seven Days Walking and was "amazed by how I felt Ludovico was walking in the Alps. I felt like he and [the character of] Fern were walking in parallel; their shared love of nature connects them, and I knew then his music would fit perfectly with our movie." She wanted the music to feel the inner dialogue that Fern (McDormand) has with herself, "In this silent moment as she's going through all these different landscapes, it's as if she is talking to us, making us understand how she has changed."

When Zhao provided him the script to Einaudi, he immediately liked it, remarking how his compositions matched with the film's themes and vision. He wanted to create something open or free and a feeling that the music was improvised or created in the moment of recording. Einaudi tried to approach the music from a different angle while recording, hence, he divided the project into seven days as there was being a new version of the piece that comes back with a different form and interpretation, each day. He added "[the] feeling of freedom that you have in the interpretation of this music is perfect for the vision of Nomadland".

Einaudi recalled that Zhao was unsure about developing the structure of the film, but that his music helped her guiding the process while editing. He added that "she used the film as architecture, like placing some columns in a building, and the building is built around the columns. The columns are the moments of travelling, and those moments of travelling in the films have those moments of my music."

Much of Einaudi's compositions were taken from Einaudi's Seven Days Walking. Since the score accompanied Einaudi's earlier releases, and not written for the film, it was considered ineligible for the Best Original Score category at the 93rd Academy Awards.

== Reception ==
Brian Tallerico of RogerEbert.com calling it as a "moving score [that] adds to the poetry" of the film and called his favorite score of the year. Chris Barsanti of Slant Magazine called it to be "gently emotive". Reviewer Mark Kermode of The Guardian, summarized "pieces by Ludovico Einaudi and Nat King Cole sit alongside the raggedy campfire sounds of the ensemble cast joyously singing "We can't wait to get in our vans again!" Unsurprisingly, it's the last of these that strikes the most resonant chord."

Patrick Gibbs of SLUG stated "the minimalist piano and string-based score by Ludovico Einaudi is unforgettable." David Rooney of The Hollywood Reporter wrote "The use of famed Italian composer Ludovico Einaudi's music is exemplary in guiding our access to Fern's inner life, starting with delicate piano melodies and steadily growing richer and more emotional as the movie progresses and her place in this new world becomes more certain." Jack Bottomley of The Yorkshire Times called it as a "gentle and thought inviting score". Jonathan Broxton of Movie Music UK noted "Nomadland could have been helped by having a project specific score anyway, but it needed something to help it connect with its audience, and the dreamy meanderings of Einaudi's piano wasn't it."

== Track listing ==
No.	Title	Artist(s)	Length
1.	"Einaudi: Oltremare"	Ludovico Einaudi	11:00
2.	"Einaudi: Seven Days Walking / Day 1 – Golden Butterflies"	Einaudi; Federico Mecozzi; Redi Hasa	5:48
3.	"On The Road Again"	Nomadland Cast	1:41
4.	"Quartzsite Vendor Blues"	Donnie Miller	3:16
5.	"Arnalds: Epilogue"	Ólafur Arnalds	4:06
6.	"Sigman: Answer Me, My Love"	Nat King Cole	2:36
7.	"Next To The Track Blues"	Paul Winer	1:14
8.	"Einaudi: Petricor"	Einaudi; Daniel Hope	6:32
9.	"Einaudi: Seven Days Walking / Day 3 – Low Mist"	Einaudi; Mecozzi; Hasa	5:53
10.	"Dave's Song"	Tay Strathairn	3:16
11.	"Drifting Away I Go"	Cat Clifford	3:03
Total length:			48:25
