= Liu Ji =

Liu Ji may refer to:

- Emperor Gaozu of Han (256 BC – 195 BC), born Liu Ji (劉季)
- Liu Ji (Eastern Wu) (劉基; 185–233), Eastern Wu politician in the Three Kingdoms period
- Liu Ji (Tang chancellor) (劉洎; died 646), Tang dynasty chancellor
- Liu Ji (general) (劉濟; 757–810), Tang dynasty general
- Liu Bowen (1311–1375), military strategist, statesman and poet of the late Yuan and early Ming dynasties, personal name Liu Ji (劉基)
- Liu Ji (Grand Secretary) (劉吉; 1427–1493), Ming dynasty mandarin
- Liu Ji (politician) (劉驥; 1887–1967), General and Politician in the Republic of China
- Liu Ji (footballer) (刘骥; born 1990), Chinese footballer
- Ji Liu (pianist) (刘骐; born 1990), U.K.-based Chinese pianist
