= Daniil Trifonov =

Russian pianist and composer (born 1991)

- Даниил Трифонов
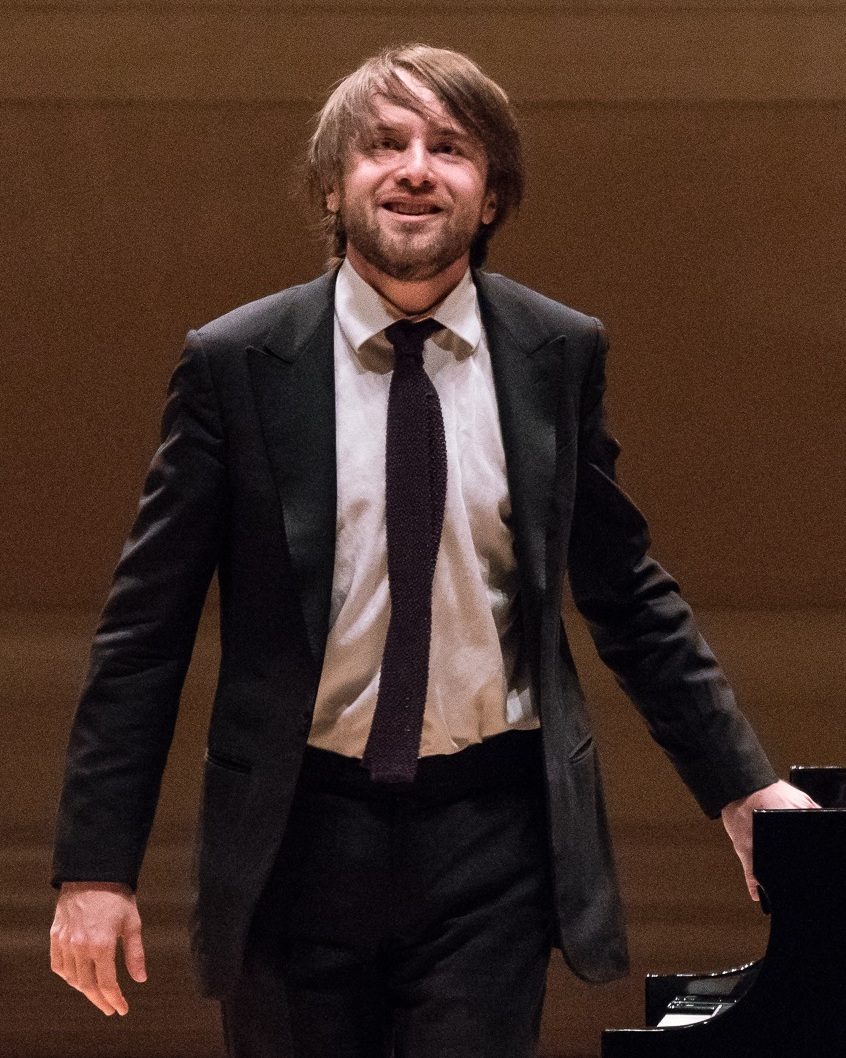
- Trifonov at Carnegie Hall in 2017
- Born: 5 March 1991 (age 35); Nizhny Novgorod, Russian SFSR, Soviet Union (now Russia)
- Occupations: Pianist and composer
- Years active: 2006–present
- Spouse: Judith Ramirez (m. 2017)
- Awards: Grammy Award for Best Classical Instrumental Solo
- Musical career
- Genre: Classical music
- Instruments: Piano
- Labels: Deutsche Grammophon, Decca Records, Dux Records, Mariinsky, Fryderyk Chopin Institute
- Website: daniiltrifonov.com

Daniil Olegovich Trifonov (Russian: Даниил Олегович Трифонов; born 5 March 1991) is a Russian pianist and composer. Described by The Globe and Mail as "arguably today's leading classical virtuoso" and by The Times as "without question the most astounding young pianist of our age", Trifonov's honors include a Grammy Award win in 2018 and the Gramophone Classical Music Awards' Artist of the Year Award in 2016.

Born in Nizhny Novgorod, Trifonov began studying piano at the age of five and performed in his first solo recital at the age of seven. In 2000, he began studying with Tatiana Zelikman at the Gnessin School of Music in Moscow. From 2009 to 2015, Trifonov studied with Sergei Babayan at the Cleveland Institute of Music. In 2011, he won the first prize and grand prix at the International Tchaikovsky Competition in addition to the first prize at the Arthur Rubinstein International Piano Master Competition, and in 2010 was a prizewinner at the International Chopin Piano Competition.

Trifonov's first three albums, recorded in 2010 and released in 2011, were devoted entirely to the music of Chopin. In 2012 he released an album that included a recording of Tchaikovsky's Piano Concerto No. 1 with the Mariinsky Theatre Orchestra conducted by Valery Gergiev. In 2013 Trifonov signed a recording contract with Deutsche Grammophon; his first album for the label, a live recording of his debut solo recital at Carnegie Hall, was nominated for a Grammy Award for Best Classical Instrumental Solo. He later won a Grammy in 2018 for an album of the complete transcendental études for piano by Franz Liszt. His albums have appeared on international record chart rankings, with seven ranking on Billboard Top Classical Album charts.

== Life and career ==
=== Early life and education ===
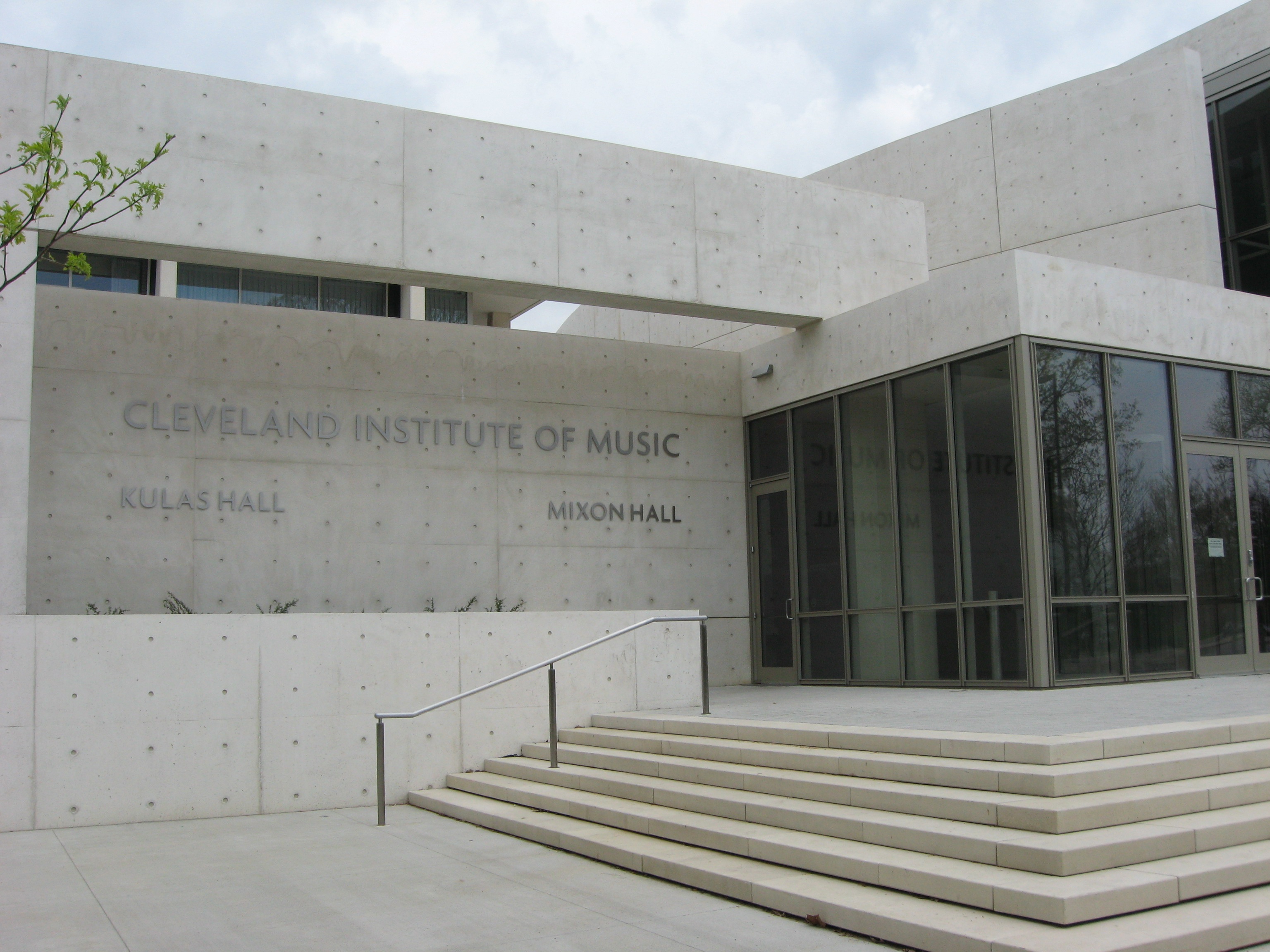
The Cleveland Institute of Music, where Trifonov studied from 2009 through 2015

Trifonov was born in Nizhny Novgorod, Soviet Union, on 5 March 1991, the only child of a composer father and a music teacher mother. He began studying the piano at the age of five, and gave his first solo concert at seven. When Trifonov was eight years old, he gave his first performance with an orchestra in a Mozart concerto, losing one of his baby teeth during the performance. In 2000, the family moved to Moscow, and Trifonov began studying under Tatiana Zelikman at the Gnessin School of Music. He also studied composition with Vladimir Dovgan from 2006 to 2009. In 2009, at the recommendation of Tatiana Zelikman, Trifonov commenced studies with Sergei Babayan at the Cleveland Institute of Music, receiving an Artist Certificate in 2013 and an Artist Diploma in 2015. Of his student, Babayan said: "Having a rare diamond like Daniil Trifonov in my studio is a huge responsibility and happiness. Just like for a parent realizing that his child is more than very special, ... I wouldn't want to use too strong words, but I think there are very few musicians like Daniil in the world. He is the music for me." While at the Cleveland Institute of Music, he was also a composition student of its head of the composition department, Keith Fitch.

=== 2006–2011: Early career ===
In 2006, at the age of 15, Trifonov won third prize in the Moscow International F. Chopin Competition for Young Pianists held in Beijing, China. At the age of 17, in 2008, Trifonov won fifth prize at the 4th International Scriabin Competition in Moscow, and first prize at the 3rd International Piano Competition of San Marino, where he also received the special prize for the best performance of Chick Corea's composition "Afterthought".

In 2010 he performed in the Rathausplatz, Vienna (Vienna City Hall Square) as one of seven finalists of the Eurovision Young Musicians. In 2010, Trifonov became a medalist of the XVI International Chopin Piano Competition in Warsaw, where he won third prize and the special prize of Polish Radio for the best mazurka performance. In the final round of the competition, he was given the maximum score by jury members Nelson Freire and Martha Argerich. Later, in 2011, Argerich told the Financial Times that Trifonov had "everything and more", adding: "What he does with his hands is technically incredible. It's also his touch – he has tenderness and also the demonic element. I never heard anything like that".

In May 2011, Trifonov won the first prize at the XIII Arthur Rubinstein International Piano Master Competition in Tel Aviv, winning also the Pnina Salzman Prize for the Best Performer of a Chopin piece, the prize for the Best Performer of Chamber Music and the Audience Favorite Prize. A few weeks after winning the Rubinstein Competition, Trifonov was awarded the first prize, gold medal, and grand prix at the XIV International Tchaikovsky Competition in Moscow. Trifonov also won the Audience Award and the Award for the Best Performance of a Chamber Concerto. In a statement released after Trifonov's winning of the Tchaikovsky competition, Cleveland Institute of Music President Joel Smirnoff wrote: "In Mr. Trifonov, we are seeing the emergence of a major artistic interpreter of the piano literature. One must marvel at his remarkable performances in the recent Chopin, Rubinstein, and Tchaikovsky competitions, and we look forward in the coming years to hearing and watching him share his special, expressive and virtuosic talents with the greater world." For the twelve months following the competition, Trifonov performed some 85 concerts; he received 150 offers, but said "at my age, 150 would be suicidal". One of these concerts took place shortly after the Tchaikovsky competition, in July 2011: Trifonov played a recital in Mannes School of Music as part of the International Keyboard Institute and Festival. Writing in The New York Times, Anthony Tommasini noted that Trifonov "has scintillating technique and a virtuosic flair", but is "also a thoughtful artist and, when so moved, he can play with soft-spoken delicacy, not what you associate with competition conquerors".

In October 2011, in a review of a concert where Trifonov performed Tchaikovsky's Piano Concerto No. 1 with the Mariinsky Theatre Orchestra conducted by Valery Gergiev at George Mason University's Center for the Arts, Anne Midgette of The Washington Post called Trifonov's playing "freakishly brilliant", but added that it wasn't always "easy or even enjoyable to hear" and left her "enervated and slightly disturbed". Midgette noted that "throughout the piece, routine patches or banging (was it a bad piano?) would yield to moments of startling precision that offered unexpected insights. Toward the end of the first movement, he played with such intensity that it seemed as if this moment was the greatest or most powerful thing that one could possibly experience. At that moment, for this 20-year-old pianist, it was." However, of Trifonov's encore, a Chopin Grande valse brillante, Midgette wrote that it "sealed the deal" that Trifonov "is a major artist in the making". She added that Trifonov's rubato "was a byproduct of the music rather than something inflicted on it, and the waltz's repeating theme, which often feels dutiful and even hackneyed by its final iterations, sounded new, natural, self-evident and delightful each time he played it".

Three days later, Trifonov made his Carnegie Hall debut in the same concerto with the same orchestra and conductor. James R. Oestreich of The New York Times was critical of the performance: "Mr. Trifonov's performance often seemed frenetic rather than magisterial. And he tended to offset extremely fast playing with extremely slow, more maundering than meditative: a manic-depressive approach that might be appropriate to Tchaikovsky's Pathétique Symphony but not to this vital concerto." However, Oestreich noted that in Trifonov's two encores, the Chopin Grande valse brillante in E♭ major (Op. 18) and Liszt's "La campanella", the pianist "showed greater sensitivity, taste and imagination".

In November, Trifonov performed a sold-out recital at the Cleveland Institute of Music. Of that concert, Donald Rosenberg of The Plain Dealer wrote that Trifonov's playing was "virtuosic and sensitive, combining remarkable command of the keyboard with an abiding joy of music-making".

=== 2012–2015: Growing acclaim ===
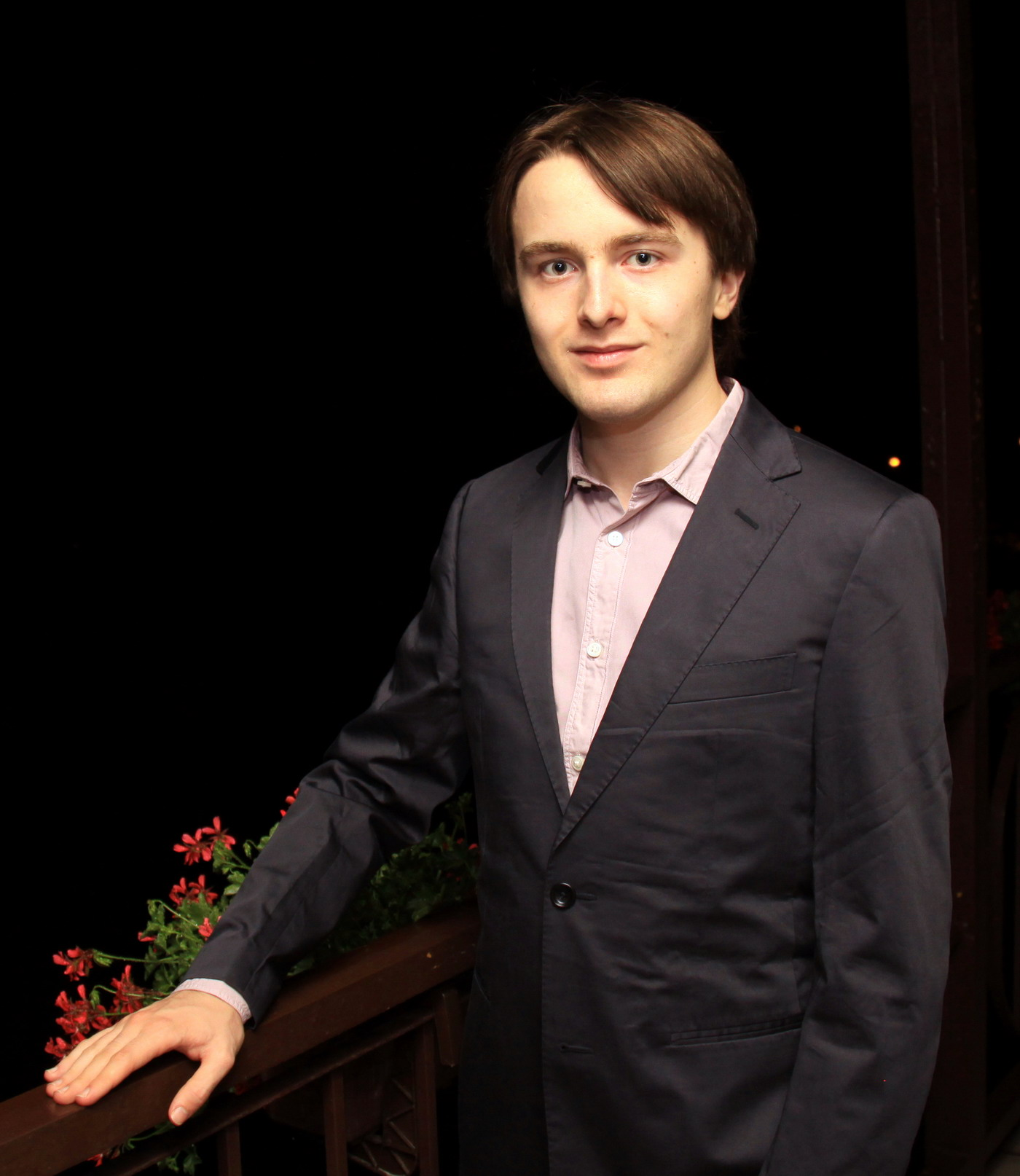
Trifonov in Busko-Zdrój, July 2012

In 2012 some of Trifonov's debuts included appearances with the New York Philharmonic, Chicago Symphony Orchestra, Cleveland Orchestra, and recitals in Wigmore Hall and Queen Elizabeth Hall in London, Longy School of Music of Bard College in Boston, the Musikverein in Vienna, and the Salle Pleyel in Paris. Of his debut with the New York Philharmonic at David Geffen Hall (then named Avery Fisher Hall) in Prokofiev's Piano Concerto No. 3 (Op. 26) conducted by Alan Gilbert, Vivien Schweitzer of The New York Times wrote that Trifonov "offered far more than mere virtuosity", demonstrating "an elegant touch and witty grace in more light-hearted moments and poetic insight in more introspective passages". Of his debut with the Cleveland Orchestra at its Blossom Festival in Chopin's Piano Concerto No. 1 conducted by James Gaffigan, The Plain Dealer noted that his performance "demonstrated exquisite finger control, a good ear for tonal shading and supreme contrapuntal clarity". Conversely, of his Wigmore Hall debut, Martin Kettle of The Guardian wrote that "there is a rawness in [Trifonov's] playing that is by turns intoxicating and frustrating", adding that "the battle for his artistic soul is still taking place".

In February 2013, Trifonov made his recital debut at Carnegie Hall. In a review of that concert, Vivien Schweitzer of The New York Times noted that Trifonov gave a "beautifully shaped, introspective and elegantly colored interpretation" of Alexander Scriabin's Piano Sonata No. 2 (Op. 19) and that his "soulful artistry and virtuoso chops were in full evidence" in Franz Liszt's Piano Sonata in B minor. However, of the Liszt Sonata, Schweitzer wrote that "overall his interpretation lacked an essential power and demonic fury", adding that "hardly surprising if at only 21 Mr. Trifonov is not yet at the height of his artistry; it will doubtless be even more rewarding to hear him play this work in a few years." The concert was recorded by Deutsche Grammophon (DG) for an album release later in the year; it peaked at #18 in Billboard Top Classical Albums charts and was nominated for a Grammy Award. Also in 2013 he was awarded the Franco Abbiati Prize for Best Instrumental Soloist by Italy's foremost music critics. Previous recipients of the award include Maurizio Pollini, Arturo Benedetti Michelangeli, Sviatoslav Richter, Radu Lupu, and András Schiff.

In 2014 the Cleveland Institute of Music commissioned Trifonov to write a concerto for piano and orchestra. The world premiere of the Piano Concerto in E♭ minor took place on 23 April; the composer was soloist and was accompanied by the CIM Orchestra conducted by Joel Smirnoff. Of the performance, Zachary Lewis of The Plain Dealer wrote that "even having seen it, one cannot quite believe it. Such is the artistry of pianist-composer Daniil Trifonov." He also wrote of the concerto that while it "contained whole expanses of raw originality, the work also struck this listener as heavily indebted to such masters as Scriabin, Bartok, Shostakovich and Prokofiev".

From 2014 to 2015, Trifonov performed the complete cycle of Rachmaninoff piano concertos and Rhapsody on a Theme of Paganini with the New York Philharmonic. He also recorded the Rhapsody on a Theme of Paganini with the Philadelphia Orchestra conducted by Yannick Nézet-Séguin for his second album for DG. The album, which included other solo works by Rachmaninoff as well as his own composition Rachmaniana, secured Trifonov his second Grammy nomination.

=== 2016–present: Awards and residencies ===
In 2016 Trifonov released an album of the complete études for piano by Liszt. The album was a major success. It was the winner of the Grammy Award for Best Classical Instrumental Solo in 2018, was listed on The New York Times' "Best Classical Music Recordings of 2016", and appeared in numerous record charts internationally, including the number one position of UK Classical Charts' Specialist Classical Albums Chart and the number four position on Billboard Top Classical Albums chart. He was also in 2016 awarded two British prestigious awards: Gramophone Classical Music Awards' Artist of the Year Award and Instrumentalist Award of the Royal Philharmonic Society Music Awards.

In 2017 Trifonov was awarded the Herbert von Karajan Prize at the Salzburg Easter Festival.

Trifonov has served as Berlin Philharmonic's Artist-in-Residence for the 2018–2019 season. As part of the residency, Trifonov performed a solo recital and a recital of Lieder with Matthias Goerne. In June 2019, he performed the Scriabin Piano Concerto (Op. 20) with the orchestra conducted by Andris Nelsons and performed a concert of chamber music with members of the orchestra in a program that included his own Piano Quintet.

In 2019 Trifonov was named New York Philharmonic's Artist-in-Residence for the 2019–2020 season. He was also named Musical America's Artist of the Year for 2019.

Trifonov has been described by The Globe and Mail as "arguably today's leading classical virtuoso" and by The Times as "without question the most astounding pianist of our age". The New York Times has noted that "few artists have burst onto the classical music scene in recent years with the incandescence" of Trifonov.

== Reviews ==
The BBC Radio 3 CD Review programme of 10 August 2013 opined that: "Now the 21-year-old pianist is obviously the real deal, this isn't all flash and dash although there's plenty of both as you all hear but listen out for the expressiveness of Trifonov's approach, the way he plays with the tempo and keeps some of his powder dry for the coda where he almost leaves the orchestra trailing in his wake, and they sound as if they're having a ball as well."

In 2017, Alex Ross, the music critic of The New Yorker wrote:

Daniil Trifonov creates a furor. ... [as did] Vladimir Horowitz..., Paderewski..., Sviatoslav Richter, the young Martha Argerich, and the young Evgeny Kissin... Furor pianists exhibit intelligence as well as dexterity; they often make curious interpretive choices that cause head-shaking at intermission. They give a hint of the unearthly, the diabolical. ... Trifonov has a rare combination of monstrous technique and lustrous tone. The characteristic Trifonov effect is a rapid, glistening flurry of notes that hardly seems to involve the mechanical action of hammers and strings.

== Personal life ==
Trifonov resides in New York City. In 2017, he married Judith Ramirez, who works in publishing. They have a son, born in August 2020.

== Discography ==
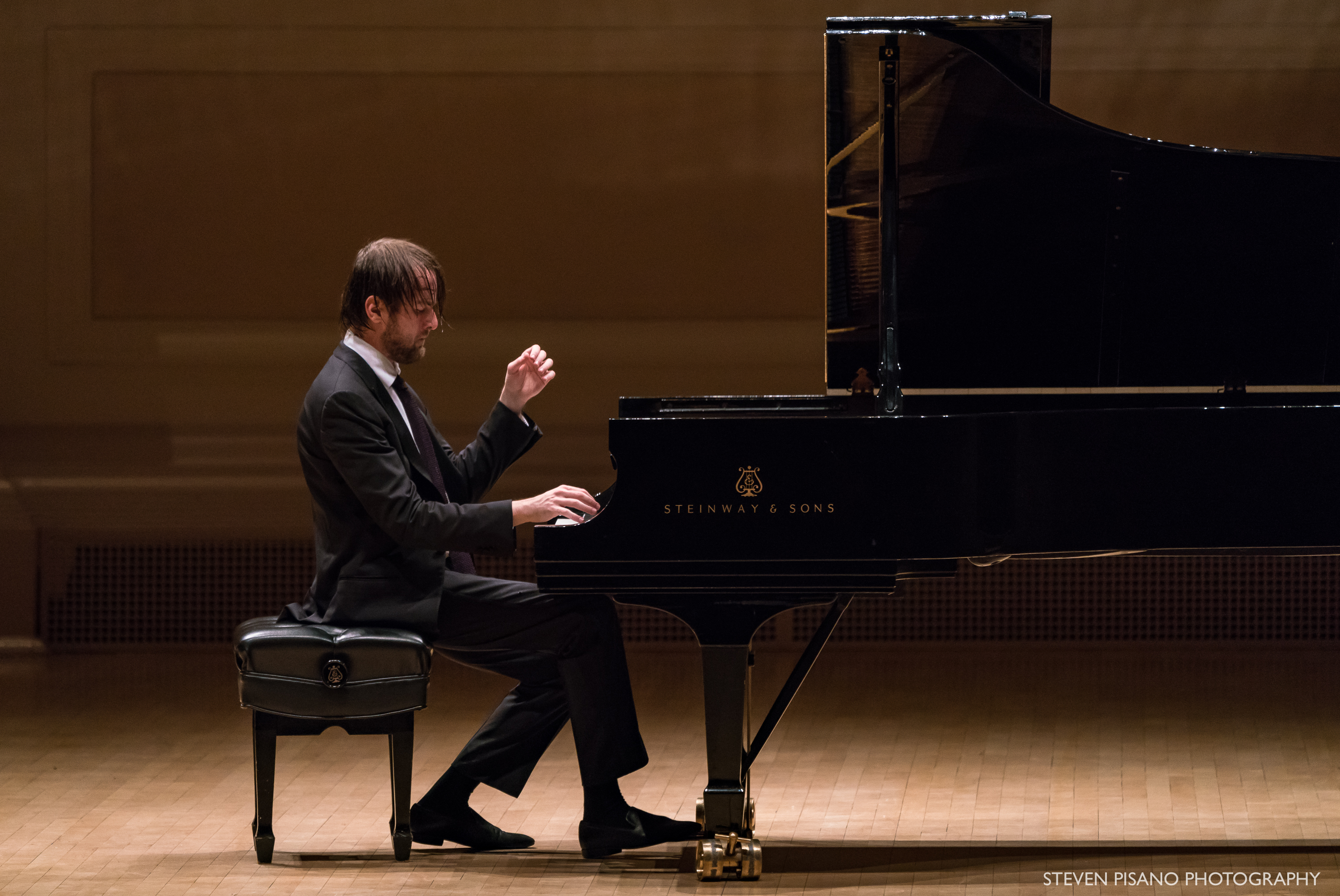
Trifonov performing at Carnegie Hall, October 2017

Trifonov's first three albums were devoted entirely to the music of Chopin; they were recorded in 2010 and released in 2011 on the Decca Records, Dux Records, and Fryderyk Chopin Institute labels. In 2012, on the Mariinsky label, an album that included a recording of Tchaikovsky's Piano Concerto No. 1 with the Mariinsky Theatre Orchestra conducted by Valery Gergiev was released; this recording was described by International Piano magazine as "a simply remarkable disc.... Daniil Trifonov's playing is a heady mix of super-virtuoso and the ability to generate the utmost tenderness.... He demonstrates an enviable variety of touch and shading ... the couplings are as intelligent as they are magnificent".

In 2013 Trifonov signed an exclusive recording contract with Deutsche Grammophon (DG). His first album for DG, The Carnegie Recital, was of a live recording from a recital he had given in Carnegie Hall that month, and for which he received his first Grammy nomination. Trifonov was also nominated for a Grammy in 2015 for his next album for DG, which included a recording of Rachmaninoff's Rhapsody on a Theme of Paganini with the Philadelphia Orchestra conducted by Yannick Nézet-Séguin. In 2016, Trifonov recorded the complete piano études of Franz Liszt in his next album for DG, which was a major success. It reached the number one position in the Specialist Classical Albums Chart in the United Kingdom in October 2016, was designated one of "The Best Classical Music Recordings of 2016" by The New York Times, and won the 2018 Grammy Award for Best Classical Instrumental Solo. Trifonov has earned considerable commercial and critical success for his discography. In 2016, Trifonov received the Gramophone Classical Music Awards' Artist of the Year Award. His successes also include appearances on international record chart rankings, including seven albums that have ranked on Billboard Top Classical Album charts.
