= Elements (Ludovico Einaudi album) =

Studio album by Ludovico Einaudi
- Released: 16 October 2015
- Genre: Modern classical
- Length: 62:44
- Label: Decca
- Producer: Ludovico Einaudi

Ludovico Einaudi chronology
| Taranta Project (2015) | Elements (2015) | Seven Days Walking (2019) |

Elements is a studio album by Italian composer Ludovico Einaudi released on 16 October 2015.

== Background ==
On 22 September 2012 Einaudi performed a project called "The Elements" at the Auditorium Parco della Musica in Rome as a tribute to his mentor, Luciano Berio, inspired by the four classical elements of air, water, earth, and fire. One piece from the project, "Newton's Cradle", appeared on his 2013 release, In a Time Lapse.

The track "Four Dimensions" from this album was also, for the most part, recorded live from the 2012 project's performance.

== Writing and recording ==
The album takes inspiration from elements of nature, with each track evolving from a small gesture or motif, evoking a journey through fragmented thoughts and feelings. Einaudi says: "I saw new frontiers — on the edge between what I knew and what I didn't know — that I had long wanted to explore: creation myths, the periodic table, Euclid's geometry, Kandinsky's writings, the matter of sound and of colour, the stems of wild grass in a meadow, the shapes of the landscape…"

The title track "Elements" epitomises this exploration of organic growth. The opening begins with small, understated gestures: the "heartbeat" of the bass and electric guitar, coloured with the Rhodes motif. This gradually builds through waves of energy as each element develops, eventually incorporating the full, momentous force of the string orchestra (recorded on the album by the Amsterdam Sinfonietta). This piano solo arrangement remains faithful to the original impression, with each layer growing from the opening fragments. The unique accompanying backing track supports the soloist and reproduces the same invigorating energy as the album recording, providing a chance to delve into the music and immerse yourself in a truly exhilarating experience. The opening keyboard loop of "Night" forms the identity of the song, which develops gradually with gentle cross rhythms from the piano, blended with rich harmonies and scalic fragments from the strings.

Einaudi discussed the themes of "Elements" in a September 2015 podcast with The Mouth Magazine.

In addition to Einaudi, performers on the album include usual collaborators Francesco Arcuri, Marco Decimo, Mauro Durante, Alberto Fabris, Federico Mecozzi and Redi Hasa, as well as the Amsterdam Sinfonietta string ensemble, Robert Lippok, the percussionists of Rome's Parco della Musica music complex, Mauro Refosco, and on "Petricor", violinist Daniel Hope.

== Releases ==
For the first time in his career in anticipation of the album release, Einaudi made available piano scores of two tracks, "Elements" and "Night", complete with the free original backing tracks.

The albums 12 tracks were released on CD and LP in 2015. Streaming releases that same year added variations of "Drop", "Elements" and "Twice". In early 2016, Elements Remixes, an EP of remixes of some of the album's pieces was released on CD and streaming; two mixes of "Elements" (by DJ Tennis and Eagles & Butterflies), two mixes of "Drop" (by Mogwai and Starkey) and a mix of "Night" (by Lone Wolf Trait) were featured. In late 2016, Decca Records released a "Special Edition" of the album that included a CD with the 15 aforementioned cuts plus a 2016 performance of "Elegy for the Arctic" and a DVD with video of Einaudi performing of the albums tracks recorded live at London’s Royal Festival Hall in July 2016.

== Reception ==
Si Hawkins writing for The National waxes, "Having long been dismissed as a purveyor of background sound, Einaudi now pushes his sonic visions to the fore. Elements is anything but incidental music." Classicalite's Steve Nagel writes that "Ludovico Einaudi's Elements exhibits a dramatic fusion of minimalism with patterns that trend all across modern cinema," and that, "because of its simplicity, perhaps it's no small wonder that Elements has made its way into the mainstream."

== Track listing ==
| No. | Title | Length |
|---|---|---|
| 1. | "Petricor" | 6:34 |
| 2. | "Night" | 5:30 |
| 3. | "Drop" | 5:00 |
| 4. | "Four Dimensions" | 4:42 |
| 5. | "Elements" | 6:05 |
| 6. | "Whirling Winds" | 5:58 |
| 7. | "Twice" | 5:21 |
| 8. | "ABC" | 3:05 |
| 9. | "Numbers" | 4:35 |
| 10. | "Mountain" | 6:13 |
| 11. | "Logos" | 6:23 |
| 12. | "Song for Gavin" | 3:18 |

Bonus tracks
| No. | Title | Length |
|---|---|---|
| 13. | "Drop Variation" | 3:48 |
| 14. | "Elements Variation" | 3:39 |
| 15. | "Twice Variation" | 5:25 |

== Charts ==
=== Weekly charts ===
| Chart (2015) | Peak position |
|---|---|
| Australian Albums (ARIA) | 66 |
| Austrian Albums (Ö3 Austria) | 23 |
| Belgian Albums (Ultratop Flanders) | 5 |
| Belgian Albums (Ultratop Wallonia) | 29 |
| Canada Albums (Billboard) | 68 |
| Dutch Albums (Album Top 100) | 6 |
| French Albums (SNEP) | 101 |
| German Albums (Offizielle Top 100) | 17 |
| Irish Albums (IRMA) | 31 |
| Italian Albums (FIMI) | 5 |
| Portuguese Albums (AFP) | 22 |
| Scottish Albums (OCC) | 10 |
| Spanish Albums (PROMUSICAE) | 44 |
| Swiss Albums (Schweizer Hitparade) | 16 |
| UK Albums (OCC) | 12 |
| UK Album Downloads (OCC) | 6 |

=== Year-end charts ===
| Chart (2015) | Position |
|---|---|
| Belgian Albums (Ultratop Flanders) | 164 |

== Certifications ==
| Region | Certification | Certified units/sales |
|---|---|---|
| Italy (FIMI) | Gold | 25,000^{‡} |
| Poland (ZPAV) | Gold | 10,000^{‡} |
| United Kingdom (BPI) | Silver | 60,000^{‡} |
^{‡} Sales+streaming figures based on certification alone.
