= Highgrove Suite =

Studio album by Patrick Hawes
- Released: 2010
- Recorded: 2010
- Venue: Henry Wood Hall
- Length: circa 28 minutes
- Label: Classic FM / Decca Records
- Producer: Alexander van Ingen

The Highgrove Suite is a contemporary classical harp concerto by Patrick Hawes.

The piece was commissioned by Charles, Prince of Wales, in 2010 to celebrate the gardens of his home at Highgrove House in Gloucestershire, and was first performed in its entirety by the Philharmonia Orchestra and harpist Claire Jones in the presence of TRHs The Prince of Wales and The Duchess of Cornwall in the Orchard Room at Highgrove House in 2010.

In its original form, it was a single-movement piece entitled Goddess of the Woods, which received its première at the Royal Opera House on the Prince's 60th birthday in 2008 by Jones in her role as Official Harpist to the Prince of Wales. Three additional movements - The Wildflower Meadow, Sanctuary and The Gladiator - were created to form the Suite.

A television documentary about the work and the background to it, including an interview with the Prince of Wales by Alan Titchmarsh, was broadcast in 2010, and a recording of the work was released at around the same time, with profits going to the Prince's Charities Foundation. The recording also features Sir Hubert Parry's Lady Radnor Suite and works for harp by John Parry and William Mathias.
