= Legacy (David Garrett album) =

Instrumental album by David Garrett

Studio album by David Garrett
- Released: 2011

Legacy is an album by violinist David Garrett with the Royal Philharmonic Orchestra conducted by Ion Marin, released in 2011 in Germany and in 2012 by Decca Records in the United States.

The album reached number six in Germany, selling over 300,000 copies, the highest-ranking instrumental classical album in German chart history. It has also reached #8 in Austria and #10 on the Classical Albums chart.

This album features covers of Beethoven and Frits Kreisler, a return to his origins and his classical training.

== Track listing ==
1. Allegro ma non troppo ( Violin Concerto (Beethoven) )
2. Larghetto ( Concerto for violin and orchestra (Beethoven) )
3. Rondo (Allegro) (Violin Concerto (Beethoven) )
4. Praeludium and allegro in the style of G. Pugnani ( Fritz Kreisler )
5. Variation XVIII: Andante cantabile ( Rhapsody on a Theme of Paganini ) ( Sergei Rachmaninov )
6. Caprice viennois, Op. 2 ( Fritz Kreisler )
7. Variations on a Theme by Corelli in the Style of Tartini ( Fritz Kreisler )
8. Larghetto from Son. for violin no. 1 in F major op. 10 by Weber ( Fritz Kreisler )
9. Tambourin chinois, Op. 3 ( Fritz Kreisler )
10. Love Song ( Fritz Kreisler )
