= Elin Manahan Thomas =

Welsh soprano (born 1977)

Elin Manahan Thomas (born 1977) is a Welsh soprano. A specialist in Baroque music, she sang at the wedding of Prince Harry and Meghan Markle in May 2018.

== Biography ==
Thomas was born in Gorseinon near Swansea, Wales, the daughter of M. Wynn Thomas OBE, a Professor of Literature at Swansea University, and Karen Thomas. She was educated at the Welsh-speaking Ysgol Gyfun Gŵyr in Gowerton near Swansea, and by the time she was 15 was singing in the Swansea Bach Choir. She won a choral scholarship to Clare College, Cambridge, where she gained a starred first in Anglo-Saxon, Norse and Celtic in 1998, and completed an MPhil.

After auditioning for Sir John Eliot Gardiner she joined the Monteverdi Choir, singing in many of the concerts of the Bach Cantata Pilgrimage which the choir completed in the year 2000. In 2001 she moved to pursue postgraduate vocal studies at the Royal College of Music in London.

She went on to sing with The Sixteen, Polyphony, Cambridge Singers and the Gabrieli Consort, as well as pursuing a solo career. She is the first singer to record Bach's Alles mit Gott, a birthday ode written in 1713 and discovered in 2005. She first received great acclaim for her 'Pie Jesu' on Naxos' award-winning recording of Rutter's Requiem.

Thomas is a specialist in Baroque music.

In 2006 Thomas married baritone opera singer Robert Davies. The couple live in Haywards Heath, Sussex, and have two sons.

== Performances ==
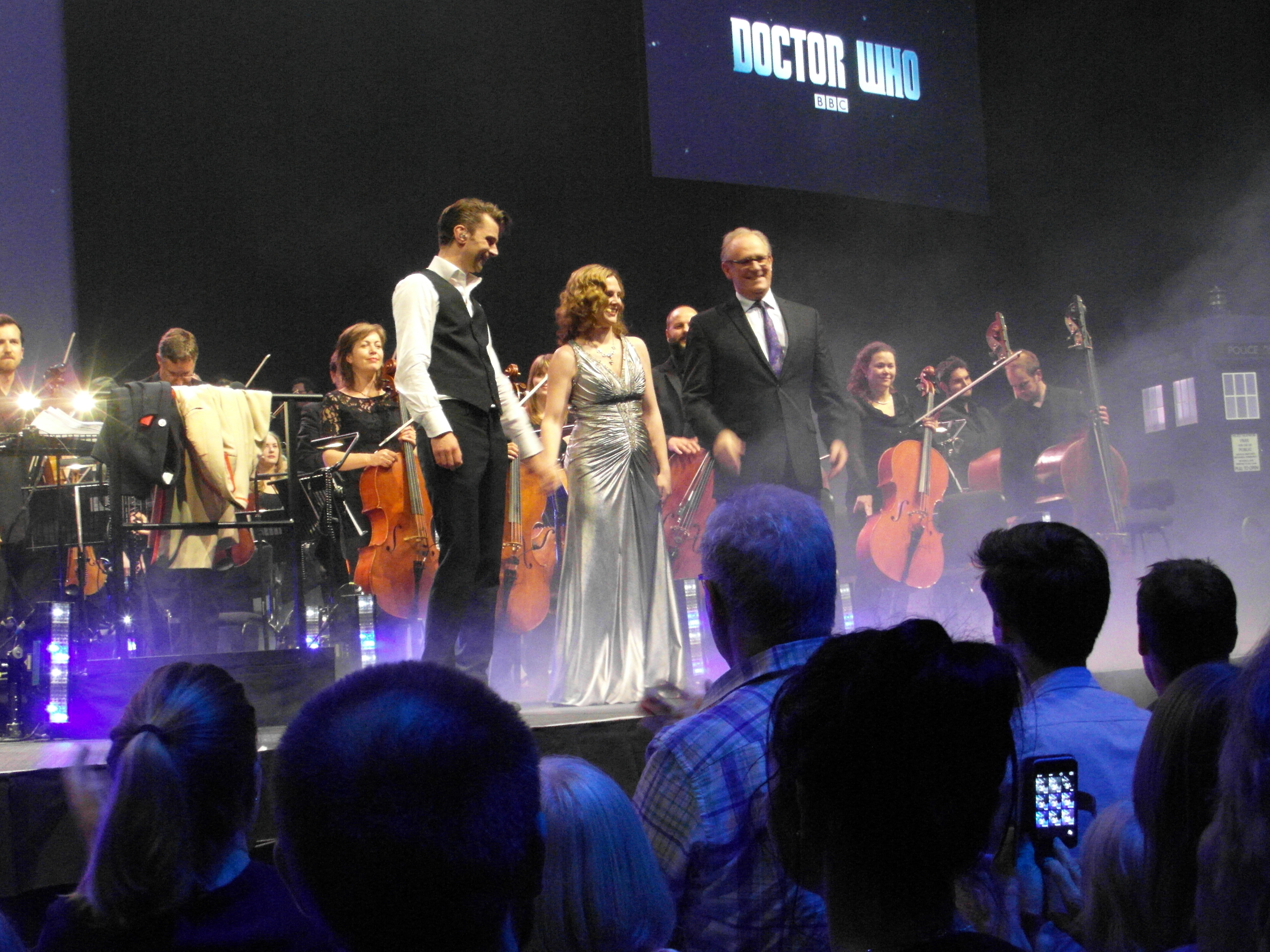
Thomas, alongside Ben Foster and Peter Davison at the Doctor Who Symphonic Spectacular in Leeds, 2015

Concert performances include Mozart Vespers in the Mostly Mozart Festival for Harry Christophers; Britten's Death in Venice for Richard Hickox in the QEH; Mozart concert arias with the Gabrieli Consort in the Barbican Hall; Bach's Christmas Oratorio with Peter Schreier in St John's, Smith Square; Mozart's Mass in C Minor in King's College Chapel; Gluck's Orfeo ed Euridice in the Snape Maltings; Haydn's Heiligemesse and Mozart Vespers on a tour of the US; the Monteverdi Vespers in St Mark's, Venice; Mendelssohn's Midsummer Night's Dream in the Palau de la Música, Barcelona; and Purcell's Dido and Aeneas in Seoul and Kuala Lumpur. She has performed Judith Weir's King Harald's Saga in collaboration with the composer, and premièred Sir John Tavener's latest work Shunya at his 60th birthday concert. She visited Rochester Cathedral for a Classic FM Concert at Christmas 2008. She performed Handel's Eternal source of light divine during the 2012 Summer Paralympics opening ceremony in London. In July 2013, Elin performed at two special Doctor Who Proms, celebrating the fiftieth anniversary of the show.

In 2016, Manahan Thomas was the soprano soloist in the première of Karl Jenkins' choral work, Cantata Memoria: For the children, at the Wales Millennium Centre. She also features on the première recording of the work.

On 19 May 2018 she sang Eternal source of light divine at the wedding of Prince Harry and Meghan Markle, accompanied by the event's orchestra and with David Blackadder playing the trumpet obbligato.

On the operatic stage, Thomas has played:

- Pamina (Mozart The Magic Flute)
- The Governess (Britten Turn of the Screw)
- Micaela (Bizet Carmen)
- Ninetta (Mozart La finta semplice)
- Arminda (Mozart La finta giardiniera)
- Despina (Mozart Così fan tutte)
- Mermaid (Weber Oberon)
- Coryphée (Berlioz Les Troyens) at the Théâtre du Châtelet
- Angelica (Handel Orlando)
- Constance (Poulenc Dialogue des Carmelites)
- Lucy (Menotti The Telephone)
- Night/Nymph (Purcell The Fairy-Queen).

== Recordings ==
- Her first solo album, Eternal Light, recorded with the Orchestra of the Age of Enlightenment conducted by Harry Christophers, was released in June 2007.
- A Christmas Festival (2008), recorded with the Cambridge Singers, Farnham Youth Choir and the Royal Philharmonic Orchestra, conducted by John Rutter
- Song of Songs (2009), composed by Patrick Hawes, featuring Hawes's choir Conventus and the English Chamber Orchestra.
- Fair Albion (2009), new works by Patrick Hawes.
- Ravish'd with Sacred Extasies (2010) includes songs by John Dowland, Henry Purcell and others, accompanied by lutenist David Miller
- This is the Day (2012) with the Cambridge Singers and Aurora Orchestra, conducted by John Rutter and produced by Thomas Hewitt Jones
- In 2015 she appeared as the featured vocalist on Jessica Curry's game soundtrack of Everybody's Gone to the Rapture.
- In 2016 Ty Cerdd released her recordings of Morfydd Owen: Portrait of a Lost Icon with Brian Ellsbury the piano accompanist.
- Her performance of Eternal Source of Light Divine, recorded at St George's Chapel, Windsor on 19 May 2018, appears on the 2018 album The Royal Wedding - The Official Album.

== Sources ==
- BBC Wales, Elin Manahan Thomas biography, 2016
- Price, Karen, "Elin Manahan Thomas starts the year on a high", Western Mail, 24 January 2009
- Kent on Line, "Elin Manahan Thomas performs Handel’s Eternal Source of Light Divine at the opening ceremony of the Paralympics" , 2012
