= In a South Downs Way =

Studio album
- Released: 17 June 2016
- Genre: classical, jazz, folk and pop
- Label: Decca
- Producer: Damian Montagu, Stewart Prosser

In a South Downs Way is the first studio album in the recording series Walk Upon England, a project which celebrates the countryside as a source of creativity in music and poetry. The album was composed by Damian Montagu and co-produced and co-arranged with Stewart Prosser. It comprises tracks evocative of the South Downs, written for strings, piano and brass, with Hugh Bonneville narrating his own original writing.

== Recording ==
The concept of the album and its key melodies originated from ideas that Damian Montagu recorded on his mobile phone while walking alone in the South Downs. After this series of walks, Damian added underlying chords and structure to his compositions back in his Sussex studio. In A South Downs Way was later produced and arranged in collaboration with Stewart Prosser and later also Hugh Bonneville became creatively involved. Initially Damian and Stewart considered whether to use the words of the Sussex poet Edward Thomas to complement the music and they invited their friend Hugh to read some extracts. Subsequently, instead, Hugh offered to write words of his own which he then narrated.

The resulting album was released in June 2016 through the classical arm of record label Decca.

== Content ==
The album is based around piano lines, brass and string arrangements, field recordings of countryside sounds and Hugh’s spoken word contributions. The compositions are performed by the Tippett Quartet as well as other musicians, including Stewart Prosser (brass), who co-produced the album. The sound of the album is analogue, with no synthesisers or electronica used.

== Reception ==
In March 2016, after Hugh Bonneville chose "The Path Towards Tomorrow" from the album as one of his tracks on BBC Radio 4’s Desert Island Discs, the song was number one for two weeks on the UK iTunes classical chart. After release in June, the full album In A South Downs Way reached the top position in the Official UK Specialist Classical Charts.

Having performed extracts of the album at the Glastonbury Festival to positive reviews, the producers recognised the potential to continue with further such compositions that would reflect other parts of the country. Subsequently, they developed the recording series Walk Upon England, aiming to bring together rural composers and writers to create a soundscape of the English countryside. The next two albums are already being developed, with the West Country and Yorkshire as possible subject areas.

== Live performances ==
The premiere live performance of In A South Downs Way took place at the Minerva Theatre, Chichester, on 13 November 2016, with the participation of musicians the Tippett Quartet, Rob Sword, Stewart Prosser, Dave Gale, Will Spencer and Darren Black and the actors Christopher Timothy, Hugh Bonneville and Juliet Howland.

== Track listing ==
No.	Title	Length
1.	"Opening"	0:57
2.	"High Above the Downs"	4:16
3.	"Flint and Clay (feat. Hugh Bonneville)"	1:36
4.	"Memorial Stone"	4:41
5.	"Reflections I"	1:36
6.	"The Path Towards Tomorrow"	3:21
7.	"Skylark (feat. Hugh Bonneville)"	1:13
8.	"England Green"	3:55
9.	"Reflections II"	1:01
10.	"Ancient Footfall (feat. Hugh Bonneville)"	5:05
11.	"High Woods"	0:26
12.	"Reflections III"	1:27
13.	"High Woods Continued"	0:32
14.	"Blue Hill"	4:41
15.	"Reflections IV"	2:02
16.	"Flint and Clay Reprise"	0:26
17.	"Reflections V"	1:00
