= The Lost Songs of St Kilda =

Studio album by James MacMillan and Trevor Morrison
- Released: 2016
- Genre: Classical
- Label: Decca

The Lost Songs of St Kilda is an album by James MacMillan and Trevor Morrison, released in 2016 by Decca Records. The album contains modern recordings of traditional songs taught to Morrison as a boy by a resident of St Kilda, Scotland. Alongside MacMillan, the album features arrangements by Craig Armstrong, C Duncan, Rebecca Dale and Francis MacDonald. The album reached the top of the classical music chart and, because it was released after Morrison's death in 2012, became the fastest selling posthumously released debut album in chart history.

== Track listing ==
1. Trevor Morrison – "Hirta"
2. Trevor Morrison – "Soay"
3. Trevor Morrison – "Boreray"
4. Trevor Morrison – "Dun"
5. Trevor Morrison – "Stac An Armin"
6. Trevor Morrison – "Stac Lee"
7. Trevor Morrison – "Levenish"
8. Trevor Morrison – "Stac Dona"
9. James MacMillan and the Scottish Festival Orchestra – "Soay" (arranged by Rebecca Dale)
10. James MacMillan and the Scottish Festival Orchestra – "Stac Lee — Dawn" (arranged by Craig Armstrong)
11. James MacMillan and the Scottish Festival Orchestra – "Stac Lee — Dusk" (arranged by Craig Armstrong)
12. James MacMillan and the Scottish Festival Orchestra – "Stac Dona" (arranged by Christopher Duncan)
13. James MacMillan and the Scottish Festival Orchestra – "Dun" (arranged by Francis Macdonald, vocals by Julie Fowlis)
14. James MacMillan and the Scottish Festival Orchestra Featuring Trevor Morrison – "Hirta" (arranged by James MacMillan)
