= Forever Vienna =

Studio album by André Rieu
- Released: 2009
- Recorded: 2009
- Genre: Classical
- Length: 1:16:45
- Label: Andre Rieu Productions
- Producer: André Rieu

André Rieu chronology
The Best Of André Rieu (2009)	Forever Vienna (2009)

Forever Vienna is the 2009 album released by violinist André Rieu. It was released as a double CD and DVD album. The DVD was recorded at the Royal Albert Hall and has some special features which include: My Home Town, photo gallery and discography. The album entered the Irish Album Charts on 4 February 2010 at number 53, it then climbed 49 places to its peak of number 4 the next week. It entered the UK Albums Chart on 3 January 2010 at number 22 and peaked at number 2.

== Track listing; CD ==
1. "The Blue Danube" - 7:57
2. "Radetzky March" - 3:10
3. "The Second Waltz" - 3:44
4. "Voices Of Spring" - 5:26
5. "Strauss & Co." - 3:50
6. "Bolero" - 6:46
7. "Vienna Blood" - 7:21
8. "Perpetuum Mobile" - 2:56
9. "Wine, Woman And Song" - 6:19
10. "Thunder And Lightning Polka" - 2:37
11. "Carnaval De Venise" - 4:37
12. "The Gypsy Baron" - 4:23
13. "The Merry Widow" - 3:03
14. "On Holiday" - 2:12
15. "Vilja Song" - 5:37
16. "You Are My Heart's Delight" - 3:31
17. "Strauss Party" - 3:26

== Charts ==
=== Weekly charts ===
Chart (2010)	Peak position
Irish Albums (IRMA)	4
New Zealand Albums (RMNZ)	18
Norwegian Albums (VG-lista)	25
Scottish Albums (OCC)	6
UK Albums (OCC)	2

=== Year-end charts ===
Chart (2010)	Position
UK Albums (OCC)	27
