= Stewart Prosser =

British brass musician and arranger

- Also known as: Stuart Prosser, S. Prosser
- Born: January 1959 (age 66); Winchester
- Genres: Jazz, ambient, classical, pop
- Occupation(s): Brass musician and composer
- Instruments: Trumpet; flugelhorn; piccolo trumpet

Stewart Prosser (born January 1959) is a British brass musician, composer and arranger (The Style Council, Walk Upon England, solo work) and corporate affairs strategist.

== Career ==
=== Musician ===
As a musician, Stewart Prosser is a trumpet, flugelhorn and piccolo trumpet player, composer and brass arranger who has worked in a wide range of styles – from ambient jazz, to classical and pop – over the last 40 years. He was principal player of the Hampshire Youth Concert Band, before moving to London in 1980 and joining a number of pop, soul and jazz bands, including Rye and The Quarter Boys and The Big Sound Authority.

He spent much of the early to mid 1980s as Paul Weller's trumpet and flugelhorn player in The Style Council, playing on such number one-selling albums as Our Favourite Shop, as well as on singles, and touring and recording extensively with the band. He was featured as a soloist with The Style Council live on Le Départ. He toured with the band and was recorded live on videos released by Polydor Records and Polygram Video – Far East and Far Out and Showbiz.

He has supported a variety of pop and rock artists as a studio and live session musician (such as trumpet arrangement and player for Animal Nightlife on top 30 single "Mr Solitaire") as well as playing on television theme tunes and brand advertising (trumpet session player on theme for television show, Every Second Counts) and he is active in small group and big band jazz ensembles. Other trumpet sessions include "I Can't Leave You Alone" (Tracie Young), "ABC" (Direct Drive), "...Get Smart!" (Squire).

Stewart and composer Damian Montagu have jointly developed the project Walk Upon England, which celebrates the countryside as a source of creativity in music and the spoken word. The first album, In a South Downs Way was released in June 2016 by Decca Records and reached No.1 in the UK Specialist Classical Chart. Earlier, in March 2016, the first single, "The Path towards Tomorrow" reached Number 1 in the UK Classical iTunes chart and has subsequently been played on BBC Radio 2, 3 and 4. It was also performed at the Glastonbury Festival. Stewart co-arranged and co-produced the album, and played trumpet and flugelhorn with his brass trio with trombonist Dave Gale and trumpeter Will Spencer. The premiere live performance of In A South Downs Way took place at the Minerva Theatre, Chichester, on 13 November 2016. A second album, A Walk Into Reverie followed in 2020.

In February 2025, Stewart released his first solo work as a triptych of tracks. Entitled Far From Home, the EP was released digitally through Elm Tree Records. It was produced by Jody Smith, an Irish multi-instrumentalist and composer, and mastered by Lucky Kilmartin. The reviews characterized its music as a blend of jazz and ambient soundscapes, based on a theme of exploration of social iniquities and personal resilience, with an atmosphere simultaneously reflective and hopeful.

In addition to composing and arranging for brass, he is involved in music education, creating and running courses for young players in conjunction with schools.

=== Corporate world ===
Stewart Prosser has also had a 30 year career in the corporate world. He led corporate and financial communications strategies and functions for blue chip, multinational brands, including Lehman Brothers (Executive Director of Corporate Communications for Europe and Asia), AXA (Director of Corporate Affairs), The Royal Bank of Scotland (Head of Public Relations, Corporate and Institutional Banking) and JPMorgan Chase (Vice-President, Corporate Communications, EAME). In 2006, he founded Prosser Associates, offering advisory and strategic support to executive teams and corporate affairs heads.
