= Scottish Festival Orchestra =

The Scottish Festival Orchestra is a Scottish orchestra, assembled from the leading professional orchestral musicians, regularly performing with a wide range of artists at many major venues throughout the country. Ben Folds, Nicola Benedetti, Belle and Sebastian, Idina Menzel and the Chieftains are only a few of the household names that have performed with the orchestra. Conductors have included, John Pryce-Jones, Iain Sutherland, Rob Moursey, Gavin Sutherland, Sir James MacMillan and Robert Ziegler.

The administrator for all the orchestra's activities is independent orchestra contractor and professional freelance cellist John Davidson

Partnered Ben Folds at the Glasgow Royal Concert Hall in July 2014.
