= Damian Montagu =

- Genre: Classical
- Occupations: Composer, music producer and song writer

Damian Montagu is a British composer, music producer and songwriter. Based in West Sussex, his work is wide-ranging and he has twice topped the iTunes Classical Singles Chart.

== Career ==
Following an Arts degree at University of East Anglia, Damian Montagu began working in television (LWT and Planet 24) and marketing for four years. In 1997, he co-founded the music production company Montagu Bourcier, where he composed and produced music for commercials, films, documentaries, and multimedia projects. The agency quickly became one of London's leading composition and sound design companies. Here he composed and produced music on a multitude of brand campaigns, including Audi, BMW, Diesel, Dunhill, RBS and Sony.

His film scores include The Cookie Thief (Palme d'Or nominated) and Subterrain, which was a collaboration with Michael Nyman. Additionally, he has created scores for award-winning work such as Football (starring Helena Bonham-Carter and directed by Gaby Dellal). Montagu has produced scores for The South Bank Show, and series as varied as Geo (a 20 part series for Arte television) and The Science of Beauty starring Sharon Stone.

In 2006, together with David Hill, the founder of Nuphonic Records, Montagu formed Radial Music, a composition and music supervision company working with major advertising agencies and also with Disney, for whom Radial supervised musical content of its video games.

In 2007, he produced an album project and a new solo project titled A Long Way from Somewhere for Damian Katkhuda, founder of the band Obi and later that year produced a track to raise HIV and AIDS awareness in Cape Verde.

In 2010, Montagu produced Wrong Side of the Dream, the second album of the singer Dawn Kinnard.

"Empty Ocean", a song that he co-wrote and recorded with the Shetland artist Lise Sinclair, inspired the 2009 programme with the same name, part of the award-winning Between the Ears series of BBC Radio 3 (Montagu was commissioned to create the suite of music for this programme).

In 2013, Montagu co-wrote and produced the No.1 Classical Chart hit "Waiting for You", featuring Victoria Beaumont, with Jonathan Goldstein and Felix Hagan.

In 2015, he launched a new music label, Moonshot Music. The first signing artist was Jahméne, whose 2nd album Unfathomable Phantasmagoria was released in September 2016. Montagu produced eight tracks on the album, including the song "I Wish" which was chosen as the Official song for Peace One Day 2016. He also produced the tracks with the actor Samuel L. Jackson narrating. Montagu co-wrote the song "Forever & Eternity" with Jahméne Douglas and Charlie J Perry, which was performed live at the 2016 Mobo Awards Pre Show.

In 2018, he released the EP Moonchild for the artist Jareth. It included the track Kaleidoscope, which Montagu co-wrote with Jareth and the producer Charlie J Perry. The song was remixed by Hybrid Minds, which led to support by the dance label UKF, featuring the remix on their Drum & Bass YouTube Channel.

In 2024, Montagu collaborated with the field-recording artist and sculptor Hazel Reeves on the single Knepp Dawn, released on 5 May 2024 to mark International Dawn Chorus Day. The track celebrates the dawn chorus in the Knepp Wildland that features bird species facing cataclysmic declines elsewhere, like the nightingale, turtle dove, cuckoo, white stork. Isabella Tree, co-owner of the Knepp and author of the book that inspired the 2023 film Wilding, was delighted with this musical tribute to the Knepp's dawn chorus, saying that: "The human response to what we hear in nature is a celebration in itself and reminds us that we, too, are part of nature's tapestry." Knepp Dawn was featured on BBC Radio 4’s Today programme, Classic FM, BBC Sussex and Magic Classical.

In 2025, Montagu co-wrote and released the single Come Pass the Time for the artist Ella Clayton. She credited the beautiful and tranquil nature of the Sussex Downs (which surround the Moonshot Studios) for the intimate, reflective tone of the track.

=== 'Walk Upon England' project ===
In March 2016, Montagu released the first single, "The Path towards Tomorrow" from the forthcoming debut album, In a South Downs Way. The single reached the Number 1 spot in the UK Classical iTunes charts and has been played on BBC Radio 3 and 4 and was also performed at the Glastonbury Festival. The album celebrates Montagu's love of the South Downs in Sussex and was composed as he walked in the surrounding countryside. The actor Hugh Bonneville has contributed and narrated written reflections on the album itself. After release in June 2016 through Decca Records, the full album In A South Downs Way reached the top position in the UK Specialist Classical Chart.

In A South Downs Way was the first of a planned series of albums under the banner 'Walk upon England', a project created by Montagu with ex-Paul Weller sideman Stewart Prosser. The series is developed as a collection of evocative albums created by composers and writers who find their inspiration in walking its most beautiful and unspoiled landscapes. Walk Upon England celebrates the English countryside as a source of creativity and self-expression.

The second album of this series, A Walk Into Reverie, was released in January 2020. Its music was written by Montagu during introspective journeys in the landscape of the South Downs. The strings were performed by the Tippett Quartet and the piano by Rob Sword, with brass arrangements and performances by Stewart Prosser, who co-produced the album.

A track from this album, The Boar’s Head, had been released earlier in 2018, as a single supported by the South Downs National Park, to mark the 100th anniversary of the WWI Armistice. The song remembers the June 1916 Attack on the Boar's Head executed by the 11th, 12th and 13th Southdowns Battalions of the Royal Sussex Regiment. The music video recalls the story of these men’s sacrifice, brought to life in an animation by Sussex artist Russell Cobb, based on archive photography of the real men who fought that day.

Montagu continues to write and produce music at his own Moonshot Studios in West Sussex.

== Discography ==
- (2007) A Long Way from Somewhere (musician: Damian Katkhuda)
- (2010) Wrong Side Of The Dream (musician: Dawn Kinnard)
- (2016) Unfathomable Phantasmagoria (musician: Jahméne)
- (2016) In A South Downs Way
- (2020) A Walk Into Reverie
