= The Great War Symphony =

Studio album by Patrick Hawes
- Released: 2018
- Recorded: 2018
- Studio: Abbey Road, London
- Genre: Classical
- Length: c. 60:00
- Label: Classic FM
- Producer: Andrew Sunnucks

The Great War Symphony is a choral symphony by the British composer Patrick Hawes written to commemorate the centenary of the First World War.

The symphony, for choir, orchestra and soloists (soprano and tenor), is in four movements with each movement depicting a year of the war – Praeludium (1914–1915), March (1915–1916), Elegy (1916–1917) and Finale (1917–1918). The music is set to the affecting words of war from poems, diaries and epitaphs including Wilfred Owen’s 1914, Siegfried Sassoon’s diary entry Hell Let Loose, Margaret Cole’s The Falling Leaves, as well as lesser known words from Sydney Bolitho’s Gallipoli and Moina Michael’s We Shall Keep The Faith (the first reference to the symbolism of the poppy).

Recorded at Abbey Road Studios, on its release in Sept 2018 the recording went straight in at No.1 in the Specialist Classical Charts and was recorded with National Youth Choirs of Great Britain, Royal Philharmonic Orchestra, Louise Alder soprano, Joshua Ellicott tenor with Hawes as conductor.

The work received its World Premiere at the Royal Albert Hall in London on 9 October 2018 and its US premiere at Carnegie Hall in New York on 11 November 2018 (Armistice Day).

== Instrumentation ==
This circa 60-minute work is scored for SATB choir and soloists (soprano and tenor) and orchestra comprising two flutes (2nd doubling piccolo), two oboes (2nd doubling cor anglais), two clarinets (2nd doubling bass clarinet), two bassoons, four horns, three trumpets (1st & 2nd doubling cornet, two tenor trombones, one bass trombone, one tuba, one timpanist (five drums), percussion (Tubular Bells, Cymbals, Bass Drum, two Snare Drums, Gong in E, Tam Tam, Triangle, Glock, Thunder Sheet), one harp and strings.
