= Patrick Hawes =

British composer, conductor, organist and pianist

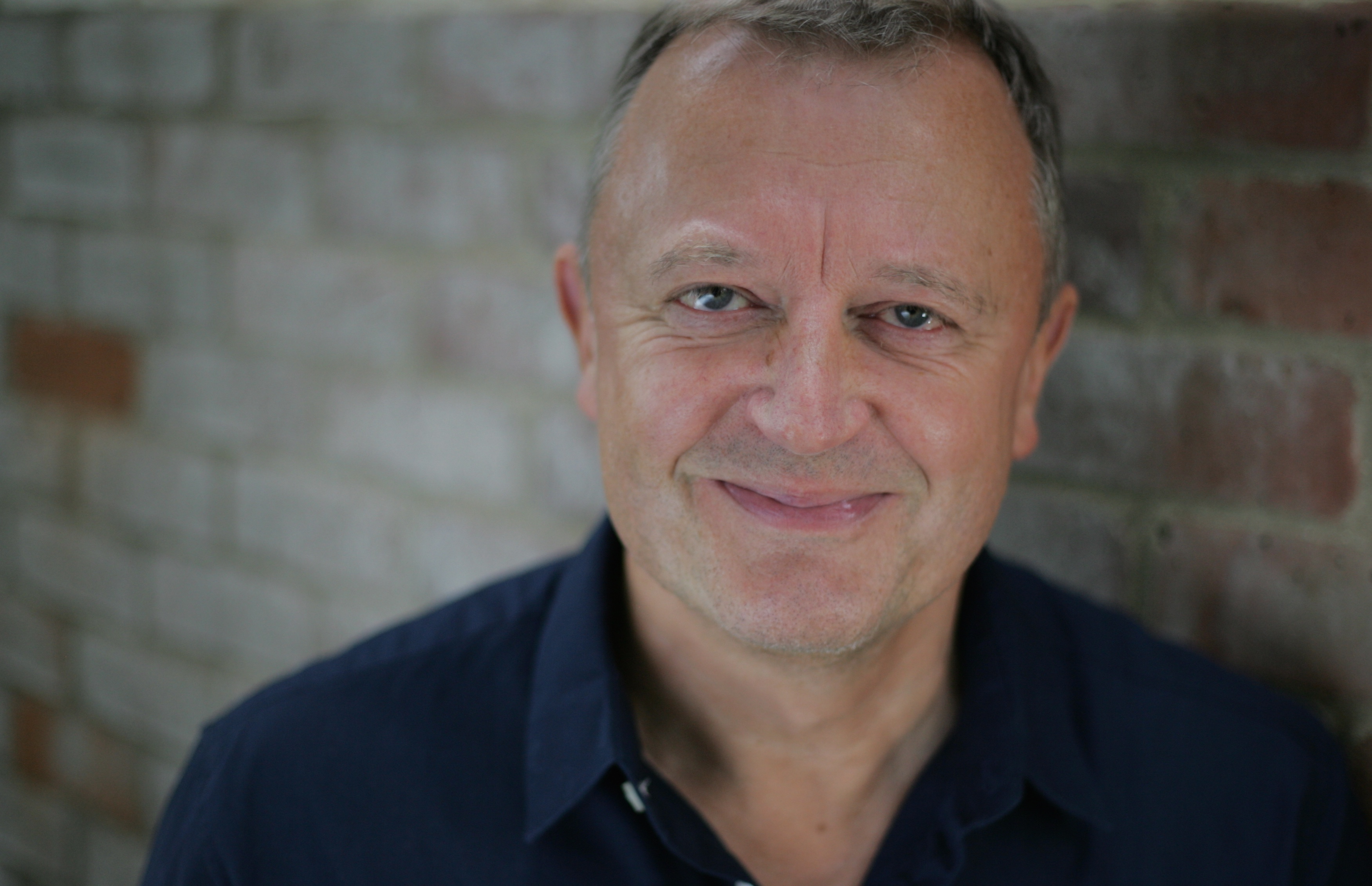
- Born: 5 December 1958 (age 67); Grimsby, Lincolnshire, England
- Occupations: Composer, conductor
- Website: PatrickHawes.com

Patrick Hawes (born 5 December 1958) is a British composer, conductor, organist and pianist.

== Biography ==
Born in Grimsby, Lincolnshire, England, the son of publican parents, Hawes grew up along the Lincolnshire coast and was educated at De Aston School. He read music at St Chad's College, University of Durham as organ scholar, and was also conductor of the University Chamber Choir and the University Symphony Orchestra. During his research year, he founded and conducted the University Chamber Singers.

He went on to work as a teacher of music and English, firstly at Pangbourne College (1981–1990) where he produced his first major work, the dramatic cantata The Wedding at Cana. This led to him becoming Composer in Residence at Charterhouse School (1990–1997).

Leaving teaching in 1997 to pursue his career as a composer, he wrote his first film score in 2002 for The Incredible Mrs Ritchie, directed by Paul Johansson. His debut album Blue in Blue, a collection of choral and orchestral pieces, was released in 2004. Made 'CD of the Week' on Classic FM in 2004, it was nominated for a Classical Brit award and was voted by Classic FM listeners as the fastest ever and highest new entry into the station's Hall of Fame. The first track on the album Quanta Qualia was subsequently covered by Hayley Westenra for her 2005 album Odyssey and a new arrangement with saxophone also featured on the 2014 Voces8 album Eventide.

From 2006 to 2007 Hawes was Composer in Residence at Classic FM where he was commissioned to write twelve pieces for piano, with each premiered over a twelve-month period. The pieces were inspired by his move to the Norfolk coast and by the skies and landscapes of the county. The resulting album Towards the Light was voted by Classic FM listeners as the highest new entry in the 2007 Hall of Fame. and a national tour followed.

April 2009 saw the release of Hawes's third album Song of Songs which consists of six choral pieces for strings and voices along with other works for choir and organ. The recording features the English Chamber Orchestra, Hawes's own choir Conventus and the soprano Elin Manahan Thomas. Hawes joined forces with Thomas once again, and also with Julian Lloyd Webber, for his subsequent album Fair Albion: Visions of England.

Hawes was commissioned by HRH Charles, Prince of Wales to write the Highgrove Suite in 2009. This began as a one-movement work for harp and strings and was premiered at the Royal Opera House, Covent Garden on the Prince's sixtieth birthday by the royal harpist Claire Jones and the Philharmonia Orchestra. Three pieces for the same forces completed the suite, each inspired by an aspect of Prince's garden at Highgrove House. The suite premiered at Highgrove on 8 June 2010. A BBC2 Alan Titchmarsh documentary about the gardens at Highgrove and the musical process and aired on 23 September 2010.

Hawes' Lazarus Requiem premiered at the Cadogan Hall, London in 2008 and the work was recorded in January 2012 by the Royal Scottish National Orchestra, Exeter Philharmonic Choir, Exeter Cathedral Choir and the soloists Thomas Walker, Elin Manahan Thomas, Rachael Lloyd, and Julian Rippon. The cathedral premiere took place in Exeter on 17 March 2012. The work intersperses the traditional Latin Requiem text with an account in English of the raising of Lazarus from St John's Gospel.

In 2013, Hawes signed to Decca Records and his album with them, Angel, was released on 3 March 2014 and secured Hawes' first Number One in the classical charts. Recorded with soprano Grace Davidson, the Choir of New College, Oxford and the Royal Philharmonic Orchestra the album depicts angels in their many forms.

As part of the commemorations of remembrance to mark the First World War, Hawes was commissioned by the Sheringham & Cromer Choral Society in Norfolk to write a large-scale work for choir and orchestra based on the life of nurse Edith Cavell, a heroine of the war who saved many hundreds of soldiers at great risk to herself. The work, Eventide: In Memoriam Edith Cavell was premiered in Norwich Cathedral in July 2014. Hawes was commissioned to write a work for the Aliquando Choir of Henley-upon-Thames based on the words of the Wilfred Owen poem I know the Music for their commemoration of the First World War in November 2014. Another work written by Hawes to commemorate the first battle of the First World War was entitled The Angel of Mons. It premiered in his brother's church in Edenham, Lincolnshire on 23 August 2014, the centenary of the date on which the apparition of the Angel of Mons was said to have occurred.

In 2015, Hawes produced his clarinet concerto for Emma Johnson which Gramophone called "musically nourishing...a fine work...gorgeous..." In 2017 he wrote two pieces for The King's Singers one in Latin and the other in English both based on the same text Musica Dei Donum and The Gift of Music.

His eighth album, Revelation, released on Naxos Records February 2017, saw Hawes collaborate with Grammy and Juno-nominated Elora Singers, Canada. The album features two collections - Revelation which sets the dramatic text from St John's Book of Revelation and Beatitudes sets Jesus' words from the Sermon on the Mount - and standalone pieces exploring key sentences from the New Testament.

In 2018, he recorded and premiered his largest work to date: The Great War Symphony. This work is a choral symphony in four movements, with each movement depicting a year of World War I. On its release in September 2018, the recording reached No.1 in the Specialist Classical Charts. The work received its World Premiere at the Royal Albert Hall in London on 9 October 2018 and its US premiere at Carnegie Hall in New York on 11 November 2018 (Armistice Day).

In 2019, he was made an Honorary Fellow of his alma mater St Chad's College, University of Durham.

In 2020 he wrote the carol "Still, Still the Night", with words by his brother Andrew Hawes, for The Self-Isolation Choir: a UK-based virtual choir to which he had taught his Quanta Qualia earlier in the year. The carol was premiered at the choir's virtual Nine Lessons and Carols on 20 December 2020.

In 2021, he released his tenth album The Fire of Love. Recorded with The Same Stream Choir and James Jordan (conductor), it features two choral collections the first based on the writings of 14th century English hermit Richard Rolle and the second based on the Songs of Innocence by William Blake. And in October 2023 he released his first Christmas album - The Nativity - recorded with the Voce Chamber Choir of Connecticut.

The world premiere of his oratorioThe Son of Man took place in Houston, Texas in September 2024 with the Houston Chamber Choir and Houston Symphony.

He currently lives near the Norfolk coast, and is inspired by the beauty of nature, English literature and heritage, and his Christian faith. Hawes remains a keen organist, holding the Fellowship award from the Royal College of Organists.

== List of works ==
=== Choral ===
- A Stranger Here for SATB & Piano (commissioned by the Mohawk High School Choral & Performing Arts)
- All Princely Graces for SATB and Military Band (commissioned by the Bands of the Household Division (United Kingdom) and the Royal Choral Society)
- Angelus Domini for SATB unaccompanied (written for Edward Higginbottom and the Choir of New College, Oxford)
- Archangel Suite for soloists, SATB, harp & strings
  1. Michael
  2. Raphael
  3. Gabriel
  4. Uriel
- Anthem for Doomed Youth for SATB & orchestra
- Ave Maria for SATB unaccompanied
- Behold The King for SATB & Organ
- Be Still for SATB unaccompanied
- Beatitudes for SATB & piano (written for The Elora Singers, Canada)
  1. The Poor in Spirit
  2. Those Who Mourn
  3. The Meek
  4. Those Who Hunger and Thirst for Righteousness
  5. The Merciful
  6. The Pure in Heart
  7. The Peacemakers
  8. Those who are Persecuted for Righteousness’ Sake
- Blue in Blue for SATB & piano or harp
- Cantate Domino for soprano, SA, organ & baritone saxophone (written for soprano Grace Davidson and saxophonist Christian Forshaw)
- Christian Soldiers arr. for SATB & orchestra
- Come To Me for SATB unaccompanied
- Come, Lord Jesus for SATB & organ (commissioned by St Chad’s College, Durham)
- Deep Harvests for SATB & two pianos
- Dressed in Blue for soprano, SA, harp & cello
- Eventide: In Memoriam Edith Cavell for soprano, SATB, semi-chorus of trebles & orchestra or chamber orchestra & organ (commissioned by the Sheringham & Cromer Choral Society)
- Factum est Silentium for SATB & solo violin
- Four Christmas Motets for SATB unaccompanied
  1. Virga Jesse
  2. Puer Natus
  3. Nesciens Mater
  4. Gaudete Omnes
- Gallipoli for SATB & orchestra (text: Sydney Bolitho)
- Hark! The Herald Angels Sing arr. for SATB & organ with optional brass & percussion
- Hearts of England for tenor, SATB & orchestra (commissioned for the Rugby League World Cup final at Wembley Stadium 2008)
- I Know The Music for soprano, SATB & strings (commissioned by the Aliquando Choir, Henley based on the unfinished poem by Wilfred Owen)
- In Bethlehem, That Noble Place for SATB unaccompanied
- I Saw the Lord for SATB & Organ (commissioned by the Choir of Magdalen College School, Oxford)
- Illumina for SATB unaccompanied
- Italian Song for countertenor, TTBB & chamber orchestra
- Joseph’s Carol for TTBB & organ
- King Jesus Hath a Garden arr. for SSAA & organ
- Lazarus Requiem for soprano, mezzo, tenor, baritone, SATB chorus, SATB semi-chorus, baritone saxophone & orchestra
- Let Us Love for SATB & piano
- Listen to the Voice of the Lord for SATB unaccompanied
- Little Ones for divided soprano voices & piano
- Lullay My Liking for ATBarB unaccompanied
- Millennium Psalms for tenor & SATB unaccompanied
- Minstrels for SATB unaccompanied
- Most Glorious Lord of Life for SATB & organ (commissioned by Wells Cathedral), based on the poem by Edmund Spenser
- Musica Dei Donum for AATBarBarB (commissioned by The King’s Singers)
- My Dearest Wish for SATB & organ (commissioned by Lincoln Cathedral for the centenary of the death of Edward King (bishop of Lincoln))
- O Come, All Ye Faithful arr. for SATB & organ with optional brass & percussion
- O Lord Our Governor for SATB & organ (commissioned by the Worshipful Company of Butchers for the 400th anniversary of their Royal Warrant, premiered in St Paul's Cathedral, 2005)
- O Waly Waly arr. for baritone, SATB, piano & orchestra
- Pacis et Caritas for SATB unaccompanied (written for the Choir of the Earth)
- Peace Beyond Thought for SATB unaccompanied
- Perfect Love for SATB unaccompanied
- Prayer to a Guardian Angel for SSAATTBarB & cello (commissioned by Voces8)
- Prayer to a Guardian Angel for soprano, harp & strings
- Psalm 91 for SATB unaccompanied & SATB quartet (commissioned by the Lancaster Chorale, Ohio)
- Quanta Qualia for soprano, SATB or SSAA, piano or strings or orchestra
- Quanta Qualia for SSAATTBarB or TTBarBarBB & alto saxophone (commissioned by Voces8)
- Quem Pastores for SATB & harp
- Reflexionem for soprano, SATB, piano or strings
- Reflexionem for SSAATTBarB & cello (commissioned by Voces8)
- Remember for soprano or SATB & piano
- Revelation for SATB unaccompanied (written for The Elora Singers, Canada)
  1. Prologue: This Prophecy
  2. Coming with the Clouds
  3. From the Throne
  4. Worthy is the Lamb
  5. A Great and Wondrous Sign
  6. Fallen is Babylon the Great
  7. Hallelujah (The Marriage of the Lamb)
  8. I Saw a New Heaven
  9. Epilogue: The Alpha and the Omega
- Silent Night arr. for SATB & organ with optional brass & percussion
- Song of Songs for SATB or SSAA, harp & strings
  1. Love’s Promise
  2. Rhapsody
  3. Many Waters
  4. Faint With Love
  5. Love’s Echo
  6. Song of Songs
- Songs of Innocence for SATB & piano (written for The Same Stream Choir, based on the poetry of William Blake)
  1. Introduction
  2. The Shepherd
  3. The Echoing Green
  4. The Lamb
  5. The Little Boy Lost and Found
  6. A Cradle Song
  7. The Divine Image
  8. A Dream
  9. On Another’s Sorrow
- Still, Still the Night for SATB unaccompanied (written for The Self-Isolation Choir)
- Te Deum for soprano, tenor, SATB, organ & orchestra (commissioned by the Lancaster Chorale, Ohio)
  1. We Praise Thee, O God
  2. To Thee All Angels Cry Aloud
  3. The Glorious Company of the Apostles
  4. Thou Art the King of Glory
  5. Thou Sittest at the Right Hand of God
  6. We Therefore Pray Thee
  7. O Lord, Save Thy People
  8. Day by Day we Magnify Thee
  9. O Lord, Have Mercy Upon Us
  10. O Lord, in Thee have I Trusted
- The Angel of Mons for SATB or SSAA, harp & strings
  1. For King and Country
  2. Angel’s Charge
  3. The March to Mons
  4. Out of the Depths
  5. Angel’s Lament
  6. Let Them Give Thanks Whom The Lord Has Redeemed
- The Blue Bird Variations for SATB & orchestra
  1. Theme
  2. Lake
  3. Bird
  4. Sky
  5. Moment
  6. Image
- The Colours of Christmas for SATB & piano
- The Dane Tree for baritone, SATB, oboe, trumpet, timpani & strings (commissioned by Daventry Choral Society, based on the poem by Alfred Noyes)
- The Dead Soldier for SATB & orchestra (text: Sydney Oswald)
- The Edenham Eucharist for celebrant, congregation, optional SATB chorus & organ
- The Gift of Music for AATBarBarB (commissioned by The King’s Singers)
- The Fire of Love for SATB, piano & string quartet (text: Andrew Hawes based on the writings of Richard Rolle)
  1. This Fire
  2. This is the Love
  3. Eternal Praises
  4. In Paradise
  5. The Angel’s Praise
  6. Endless Love
- The Great War Symphony for soprano, tenor, SATB & orchestra
- The Heart of Mary for SATB unaccompanied
- The Innocents for double SATB & organ (commissioned by Proms at St Jude’s, London)
- The King’s Carol for SATB & organ
- The Land for SATB, semi-chorus of trebles & strings or piano
  1. Spring
  2. Summer
  3. Autumn
  4. Winter
- The Last Post (They Shall Grow Not Old) for soprano, SATB & orchestra (text: Laurence Binyon)
- The Lord’s Prayer for tenor & SATB unaccompanied
- The Lord’s Prayer (from The Edenham Eucharist) for SATB unaccompanied
- The Nativity for SATB unaccomapanied (written for Voce Chamber Choir, CT)
  1. The Manger
  2. The Infant
  3. The Oxen
  4. The Shepherds
  5. The Star
  6. The Magi
- The Prodigal’s Song for divided upper voices & organ (commissioned by Daniel Hyde (organist) and Jesus College, Cambridge)
- The Song of Guthlac for TTBB, percussion, harp & strings
- The Stable Carol for divided soprano voices & organ
- The Twenty-Third Psalm (The Lord is my Shepherd) for SATB unaccompanied (written for the Winchester Consort)
- The Vauday Part Songs for SATB unaccompanied (commissioned by the St Peter’s Singers for Grimsthorpe Castle)
  1. The Oaks
  2. Stone
  3. The Carriageway
  4. In Memoriam
- The Waters of Love for soprano & tenor, or SATB, harp & strings
- The Wedding at Cana for soprano, tenor, SATB & orchestra (commissioned by Pangbourne Choral Society)
- The Word for SATB unaccompanied (text: John 1: 1-5 ESV)
- This Endernight for SATB & Organ
- Thou Art There for SATB, semi-chorus of trebles & organ (commissioned by the Choir of St James’ Church, Louth. Text: Psalm 139: 7-9)
- Tres Amores for SATB unaccompanied
- What Child Is This? for SATB unaccompanied
- When Israel was a Child for SATB & organ (commissioned by David Hill (choral director) and Winchester Cathedral. Text: Andrew Hawes based on Hosea 11)
- White Moth for SATB, harp & strings (commissioned by the Norfolk Wherry Yacht Trust)
- You for soprano, SATB & orchestra (commissioned by Sarah Brightman; text David Zippel)

=== Vocal ===
- Celebration Day for soprano, tenor, baritone & strings
- Come Away Death for baritone & strings or piano
- Echo for soprano & strings
- Echo’s Lament for Narcissus for soprano & piano
- Eye To Eye for soprano & orchestra (commissioned by the St John of Jerusalem Eye Hospital)
- Morfudd: Three Welsh Songs for soprano & piano (written for Elin Manahan Thomas. Text: Dafydd ap Gwilym)
  1. Breichiau Morfudd (Morfudd’s Arms)
  2. Siom (Disappointment)
  3. Morfudd fel yr Haul (Morfudd like the sun)
- My Song is Love Unknown for soprano & piano
- Prayer to a Guardian Angel for soprano, harp & strings
- Strong Tower for tenor & piano
  1. Christmas Night
  2. Cedar of Lebanon
  3. Ringers’ Requiem
  4. St Michael and All Angels, Edenham
- The Call for soprano & orchestra or piano
  1. The Call
  2. Autobiography
  3. St Michael & All Angel’s, Edenham
  4. Let a Florid Music Praise
  5. Remember
  6. The Tyger
  7. Two Loves
  8. Echo
  9. If I Could Tell You
  10. Who Can Deny
- The Darkling Thrush for baritone & piano (text: Thomas Hardy)
- The Far Seeing Land for tenor & piano
  1. Chapel St Leonards
  2. Market Rasen
  3. Lincoln Cathedral
  4. Grimsby Marsh
  5. Lutton
  6. Dawsmere Churchyard
- The Last Lullaby for soprano, harp & strings
- The Last Rose of Summer arr. for soprano & strings, harp, flute & oboe (commissioned by Decca Records for Laura Wright (singer))
  1. The Last Rose
  2. Down By The Salley Gardens
  3. Drink To Me Only With Thine Eyes
  4. Skye Boat Song
  5. The Ash Grove
  6. My Bonnie Lies Over The Ocean
  7. Lavender’s Blue
  8. Early One Morning

=== Opera & Oratorio ===
- A King’s Ransom opera for children’s voices & chamber orchestra
- Gobbolino, the Witch’s Cat opera for soloists & chamber orchestra (commissioned by Into Opera)
- The Son of Man oratorio for soloists, choir and chamber orchestra (written for Houston Chamber Choir)

=== Orchestral ===
- Angel Song for solo violin, harp & strings
- Clarinet Concerto No.1 for solo clarinet and strings (written for Emma Johnson (clarinettist))
- Fair Albion for orchestra
- Highgrove Suite for harp & strings (commissioned by HRH Charles, Prince of Wales)
  1. Goddess of the Woods
  2. The Wildflower Meadow
  3. Sanctuary
  4. The Gladiator
- Pavane for guitar & orchestra (from the film The Incredible Mrs Ritchie)
- Piano Concerto No.1 for solo piano and orchestra (written for Peter Jablonski)
- Quanta Qualia for orchestra
- Rain for orchestra, ethnic percussion & piano
- St George and the Dragon for harp ensemble (commissioned by the National Youth Harp Orchestra)
- Swan for strings or organ
- The Colours of Christmas for orchestra (commissioned by Classic FM)
- The Gift for orchestra
- Towards the Light for orchestra
- Waltz for orchestra

=== Instrumental ===
- After the Rain for piano & string quartet
- Angel Prelude I - Cherubim for piano
- Angel Prelude II - Seraphim for piano
- Annunciation for piano
- Ascension for string quartet (written for The Raven Quartet)
- Earth Rise for oboe & harp (written for James Turnball and Claire Jones (harpist))
- Fanfare for trumpets, trombones & tuba (commissioned by Novello for the Best of British concert, Royal Festival Hall, 2011)
- Gloriette for piano & cello (commissioned by Julian Lloyd Webber)
- How Hill for harp (written for Claire Jones (harpist))
- Lullaby for piano & violin (commissioned by Jack Liebeck for the Wigmore Hall)
- Pavane for piano
- Piano Impromptu for piano
- Quanta Qualia for lever harp or pedal harp or piano
- Reflexionem for lever harp or pedal harp or piano
- Sarabande & Allegro for oboe & harp
- Some Blessed Hope for piano & flute
- Swan for organ
- Three Broadland Preludes for piano
  1. Ranworth
  2. Fenside
  3. Remembrance
- Toccata for organ (written for Roger Sayer)
- Towards the Light for piano (commissioned by Classic FM)
  1. Towards the Light
  2. Serenitas
  3. Arioso (also for lever harp or pedal harp)
  4. My Beloved Spake
  5. Ave Maria
  6. Ebb Tide
  7. Stargazer
  8. Song of Innocence
  9. Sleep Song
  10. The Time of Sacrifice
  11. Waltz
  12. The Gift

=== Film credits ===
- Being John Malkovich (Song of the Soul)
- Prima Primavera
- The Incredible Mrs Richie

== Recordings ==
- Blue in Blue (2004) – Black Box BBM1081 & (2005) – Universal Classics and Jazz UCJ 4763020 (re-release plus new recordings)
- Towards the Light (2006) – Sony & (2010) – Decca CFM FW 148
- Song of Songs (2009) – Signum SIGCD162
- Fair Albion (2009) – Signum SIGCD178
- Highgrove Suite (2010) – Classic FM / Decca CFMD16
- Lazarus Requiem (2012) – Signum SIGCD282
- Angel (2014) – Decca 3742046
- Revelation (2017) – Naxos 8.573720
- The Great War Symphony (2018) – Classic FM / Decca CFMD64
- The Fire of Love (2021) - GIA Choral Works / Naxos CD1092
- The Nativity (2023) – Signum SIGCD752
