= Ji Liu (pianist) =

- Born: 1990 (age 35–36); China
- Genres: Classical
- Occupations: Concert pianist; Composer
- Labels: Classic FM; Global Radio
- Website: www.jipianist.com

Ji Liu (Chinese: 刘骅骐骥; pinyin: liú huá qí jì) was born 1990 and is a Chinese concert pianist, recording artist, and published composer currently based in London.

== Career ==
Ji Liu was born in China. His mother played the guitar and his father played the trumpet, although both parents were not professional musicians. Liu expressed an interest in learning the piano at the age of 3. He subsequently began piano lessons, and undertook formal studies in piano and conducting at the Shanghai Conservatory of Music. In 2003 (at the age of 13) Liu won the 6th Pinault piano competition in New York City, which subsequently led to his debut recital at Carnegie Hall.

Upon completion of his studies in Shanghai, he moved to Europe and became a pupil of Dmitri Bashkirov at the Escuela Superior de Musica Reina Sofia in Madrid. In 2007, Liu moved to London with a full scholarship to continue his Bachelor of Music in Piano Performance with Prof. Christopher Elton and Composition with Ruth Byrchmore at the Royal Academy of Music (RAM). In 2013, he graduated from the RAM with a Master of Music and a DipRAM. He made his debut at the Royal Albert Hall performing Gershwin's Rhapsody in Blue with the Royal Liverpool Philharmonic Orchestra in 2014.

Liu first record was Gershwin's Rhapsody in Blue with James Watson and the Royal Academy of Music's Symphonic Brass Ensemble on the Royal Academy of Music's label, released in November 2010. In 2014, Liu released his solo debut album Piano Reflections with ClassicFM.

In 2016, he world premiered Ludovico Einaudi's Piano Concerto "Domino" with the Royal Liverpool Philharmonic Orchestra. In 2017, he performed at Classic FM's 25th birthday concert in the presence of Their Royal Highnesses, The Prince of Wales and The Duchess of Cornwall from Dumfries House.

In 2018 Liu signed with Master Music Publications. to publish his arrangements of works by Rachmaninov, Saint-Saëns and de Falla. As well as his compositions, including Opera Moment No. 1 for Solo Piano dedicated to his contemporary Stephen Hough.

== Awards ==
In 2005 and 2006, Ji took part in the Verbier Festival & Academy in Switzerland, where he received the Tabor Piano Award and CUBS Prize from UBS Bank. He returned to the Verbier Festival in 2017. From 2008 to 2012, he was the recipient of the Martin Musical Award from the Philharmonia Orchestra. In 2010, he was awarded the Audience Prize of the Friends of RAM Wigmore Award, and was selected by the International Holland Music Session in the Netherlands for their 'New Masters on Tour' Series. In 2011, he was an award recipient from the Yamaha Music Foundation of Europe. Over the period 2011-2014, he was a recipient of several Hattori Foundation awards. He became the youngest ever first prize winner at Brant International Pianoforte Competition in Birmingham. He was selected as a Young Classical Artists Trust (YCAT) artist in 2013. He was awarded Associate of the Royal Academy of Music (ARAM) in 2019.

== Albums ==
• American Icons (2011) - Gershwin, Rhapsody in Blue, with Royal Academy of Music Symphonic Brass and James Watson
• Piano Reflections (2014)
• Piano Encores (2015)
• Pure Chopin (2016)
• Fire & Water (2018)

== Compositions and arrangements ==
=== Compositions for solo piano ===
- Opera Moment No. 1 (2019)
- Étude No. 1 (2018)
- "DNA" Sonata (2012)
- "Homage to Schubert" Sonata (2011)
- Fugue (2009)
- Étude for left hand alone (2006)

=== Arrangements for solo piano ===
- Rachmaninov Spring Waters Op. 14 No. 11 (2017)
- Paraphrase on a theme of "A Way of Life" (2011)

=== Chamber music ===
- Sonata for 2 pianos and 2 computer keyboards (2012)
- tre pezzi per oboe e pianoforte (2011)
  1. Silenzio
  2. conflito
  3. arcobaleno
- Rhapsody for violin and piano (2010)

=== Small ensemble ===
- 12 Transcendental Études for sinfonietta "Mathful!"（2012）
  1. π
  2. =
  3. ≠
  4. <
  5. >
  6. ∞
  7. ⊆
  8. x
  9. y
  10. ‖
  11. ⊥
  12. ∵

=== For voice ===
- "Snowflake", pop song for voice and MIDI devices (2010)
