= Seven Days Walking =

- Seven Days Walking: Day One

Box set by Ludovico Einaudi
- Released: Various dates in 2019
- Genre: Contemporary classical music
- Label: Decca

Ludovico Einaudi chronology
Elements (2015)	Seven Days Walking (2019)

Seven Days Walking is a set of studio releases by Italian composer Ludovico Einaudi. The project consists of seven volumes of music released over the course of seven months, beginning with the first volume, Seven Days Walking: Day One, on 15 March 2019. A complete box set of the project was released on 22 November 2019. It was announced on 1 March 2019, and a single from Day One, "Cold Wind Var. 1", was released on the same day. Seven Days Walking features Einaudi on piano, Federico Mecozzi on violin and viola, and Redi Hasa on cello.

== Background ==
In 2015, Ludovico Einaudi released the album Elements, which became his first album to reach the top 15 of the UK Albums Chart, a feat unattained by a classical artist for over 20 years. He consequently embarked on a world tour to support the album.

In January 2018, Einaudi frequently went on walks in the Alps, "always following more or less the same trail." He revealed that during the heavy snow, his "thoughts roamed free inside the storm, where all shapes, stripped bare by the cold, lost their contours and colours," allowing him to construct the "musical labyrinth" present on the records. The composer also took a series of polaroid pictures, inspiring him to write seven volumes of music, each portraying a different aspect of his journey. He consequently recorded the albums from September to October that year in Schloss Elmau in Germany, and the Air Studios in London.

== Volumes ==
=== Day One ===
Seven Days Walking: Day One was released on 15 March 2019. "Cold Wind Var. 1" was released as a single on 1 March 2019, and accompanied by a music video.

==== Commercial performance ====
Seven Days Walking: Day One debuted atop the UK Classical Artist Albums Chart and at number 31 on the UK Albums Chart, making it his fifth Top 40 record on the latter chart. It also became the fastest-streamed classical album in its first week of release of all time worldwide, exceeding 2 million streams on release day alone, consequently causing a significant uplift in classical streaming as a whole.

==== Track listing ====
No.	Title	Length
1.	"Low Mist Var. 1"	2:29
2.	"Low Mist"	5:25
3.	"Gravity"	5:27
4.	"Matches"	2:54
5.	"Cold Wind Var. 1"	3:59
6.	"Golden Butterflies"	5:53
7.	"Fox Tracks"	3:38
8.	"A Sense of Symmetry"	2:35
9.	"The Path of the Fossils"	8:15
10.	"Ascent"	5:37
11.	"Low Mist Var. 2"	5:43
Total length:		51:58

==== Charts ====
Chart (2019)	Peak position
Australian Digital Albums (ARIA)	15
Austrian Albums (Ö3 Austria)	48
Belgian Albums (Ultratop Flanders)	21
Belgian Albums (Ultratop Wallonia)	119
Dutch Albums (Album Top 100)	19
French Albums (SNEP)	119
German Albums (Offizielle Top 100)	49
Italian Albums (FIMI)	14
Scottish Albums (OCC)	18
Spanish Albums (PROMUSICAE)	25
Swiss Albums (Schweizer Hitparade)	23
UK Albums (OCC)	31

=== Day Two ===
Seven Days Walking: Day Two was released on 19 April 2019. "Birdsong" was released as a single on 29 March 2019, and accompanied by a music video directed by Tania Feghali.

==== Track listing ====
No.	Title	Length
1.	"Low Mist Var. 1"	2:44
2.	"A Sense of Symmetry"	2:36
3.	"Ascent"	6:12
4.	"Golden Butterflies Var. 1"	5:57
5.	"Birdsong"	5:25
6.	"Fox Tracks"	4:31
7.	"Campfire Var. 1"	6:14
8.	"Matches Var. 1"	2:23
9.	"The Path of the Fossils"	8:35
10.	"Cold Wind Var. 1"	4:15
11.	"Low Mist Var. 2"	2:45
Total length:		51:44

==== Charts ====
Chart (2019)	Peak position
Belgian Albums (Ultratop Flanders)	104
Scottish Albums (OCC)	92
Swiss Albums (Schweizer Hitparade)	44

=== Day Three ===
Seven Days Walking: Day Three was released on 17 May 2019. "Campfire" was released as a single on 3 May 2019. and "Fox Tracks" was released as a single on 10 May 2019.

==== Track listing ====
No.	Title	Length
1.	"Low Mist"	5:54
2.	"Gravity"	5:52
3.	"Golden Butterflies"	5:53
4.	"The Path of the Fossils"	8:50
5.	"Campfire"	4:31
6.	"A Sense of Symmetry"	2:27
7.	"Fox Tracks"	4:17
8.	"View from the Other Side"	4:22
9.	"Full Moon"	3:38
10.	"Matches"	2:52
11.	"Cold Wind"	4:32
12.	"Ascent"	6:24
Total length:		59:39

==== Charts ====
Chart (2019)	Peak position
Belgian Albums (Ultratop Flanders)	129
Swiss Albums (Schweizer Hitparade)	84

=== Day Four ===
Seven Days Walking: Day Four was released on 21 June 2019. "Ascent" was released as a single (in some countries) on 31 May 2019, and "View from the Other Side" was released as a single on 14 June 2019.

==== Track listing ====
No.	Title	Length
1.	"Low Mist Var. 1"	2:29
2.	"Cold Wind Var. 1"	3:28
3.	"A Sense of Symmetry"	2:35
4.	"Gravity Var. 1"	5:28
5.	"Fox Tracks"	3:39
6.	"Low Mist Var. 2"	5:16
7.	"Campfire"	3:45
8.	"Cold Wind Var. 2"	5:14
9.	"Matches"	2:45
10.	"View from the Other Side"	4:23
11.	"Full Moon"	3:04
12.	"Ascent"	5:03
Total length:		47:15

==== Charts ====
Chart (2019)	Peak position
Belgian Albums (Ultratop Flanders)	180
Swiss Albums (Schweizer Hitparade)	70

=== Day Five ===
Seven Days Walking: Day Five was released on 19 July 2019. "Golden Butterflies" was released as a single (in some countries) on 28 June 2019 and "Ascent" was released as a single on 12 July 2019.

==== Track listing ====
No.	Title	Length
1.	"Ascent"	5:47
2.	"Golden Butterflies Var. 1"	2:52
3.	"Gravity Var. 1"	6:22
4.	"Matches Var. 1"	2:52
5.	"View from the Other Side Var. 1"	3:04
6.	"Full Moon"	3:41
7.	"Campfire Var. 1"	3:23
8.	"Cold Wind"	5:26
9.	"Golden Butterflies"	6:00
10.	"Low Mist"	4:13
11.	"Low Mist Var. 1"	4:41
Total length:		48:21

==== Charts ====
Chart (2019)	Peak position
Swiss Albums (Schweizer Hitparade)	64

=== Day Six ===
Seven Days Walking: Day Six was released on 16 August 2019. "Low Mist Var. 2" was released as a single on 26 July 2019.

==== Track listing ====
No.	Title	Length
1.	"Low Mist Var.1"	3:08
2.	"Low Mist"	3:19
3.	"Gravity"	5:54
4.	"Matches"	3:11
5.	"A Sense of Symmetry"	4:02
6.	"Cold Wind Var. 1"	3:57
7.	"Cold Wind"	7:06
8.	"Cold Wind Var. 2"	1:42
9.	"Low Mist Var. 2"	8:07
10.	"Ascent"	5:58
11.	"The Path of the Fossils"	9:46
Total length:		56:18

==== Charts ====
Chart (2019)	Peak position
Australian Digital Albums (ARIA)	28
Belgian Albums (Ultratop Flanders)	176

=== Day Seven ===
Seven Days Walking: Day Seven was released on 20 September 2019, and is performed by Einaudi alone. "Ascent" was released as a single on 9 August 2019 and accompanied by a promo video.

==== Track listing ====
No.	Title	Length
1.	"Campfire Var. 1"	6:05
2.	"Ascent"	5:24
3.	"A Sense of Symmetry"	3:23
4.	"Cold Wind Var. 1"	3:03
5.	"Golden Butterflies Var. 1"	1:56
6.	"Gravity"	5:36
7.	"Low Mist Var. 1"	2:12
8.	"Low Mist"	5:26
9.	"Birdsong"	4:53
10.	"Cold Wind Var. 2"	2:50
11.	"Low Mist Var. 2"	5:56
12.	"Campfire Var. 2"	3:36
Total length:		50:20

==== Charts ====
Chart (2019)	Peak position
Belgian Albums (Ultratop Flanders)	178

=== Day 1–7 ===
Seven Days Walking: Day 1–7 was released on 22 November 2019.

==== Charts ====
Chart (2019)	Peak position
Belgian Albums (Ultratop Flanders)	72
Dutch Albums (Album Top 100)	75
German Albums (Offizielle Top 100)	69
