= Katherine Jenkins discography =

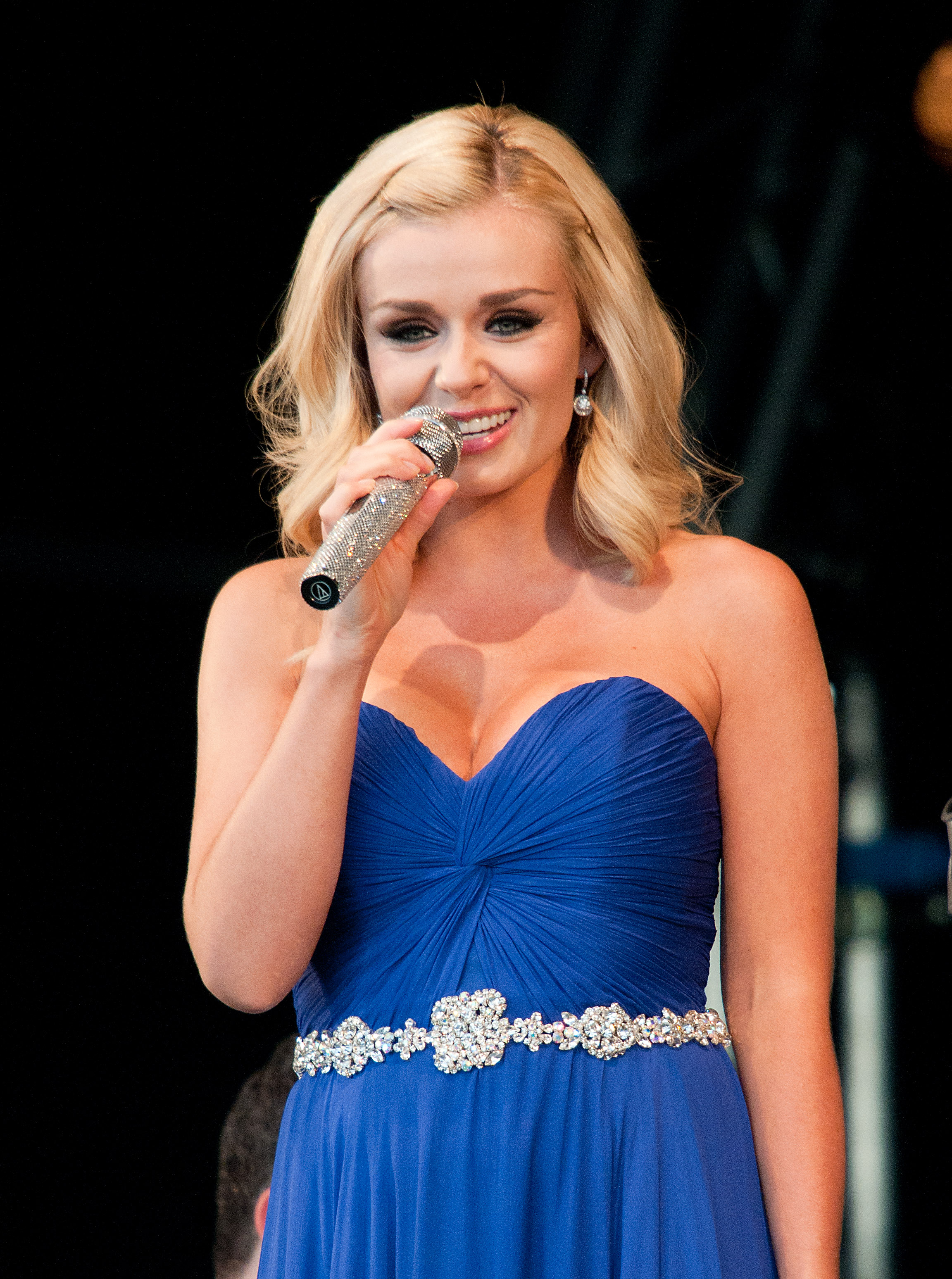
- Studio albums: 13
- Soundtrack albums: 2
- Compilation albums: 4
- Singles: 11
- Video albums: 4

The discography of Katherine Jenkins, a Welsh mezzo-soprano singer, consists of twelve studio albums, two soundtrack albums, two compilation albums, eleven singles and three video albums.

Released in April 2004, Jenkins's classical chart-topping debut album Premiere was a mix of old standards including Ave Maria and The Lord Is My Shepherd, plus a smattering of traditional Welsh songs and new interpretations of classic tunes by Handel, Bach, Erik Satie and others. The album made her the fastest-selling mezzo-soprano to date she became the first British classical crossover artist to have two number one albums in the same year. Her second album, Second Nature, reached number 16 in the UK later on in 2004. Next album, Living A Dream followed in 2005 and held the number one position in the classical charts for nearly a year and reached number four in the pop album charts. Her fourth album, Serenade was released in November 2006 and reached number five in the mainstream charts selling more than 50,000 copies in its first week, a record in the genre. Fifth album, Rejoice, was released a year later in November 2007 and included songs written specially for her and entered the pop album charts at number three, beating the Spice Girls and Girls Aloud.

In October 2008 Jenkins released Sacred Arias, which was her last album with Universal Music. The Telegraph stated that Jenkins had signed the biggest classical recording deal in history, for $10 million (£5.8 million), with Warner Music. Jenkins released Believe, in October 2009, the first with Warner Music, featuring guest artists Andrea Bocelli, André Rieu and Chris Botti. She released Daydream in October 2011, This Is Christmas in October 2012 and Home Sweet Home in November 2014.

== Albums ==
=== Studio albums ===
Title	Details	Peak chart positions									Certifications
Title	Details	UK	UK Classical	AUS	EU	GER	IRE	NZ	US	US Class	Certifications
Premiere	Released: 5 April 2004; Label: Universal; Format: CD, digital download	31	1	—	—	—	—	—	—	—	BPI: Gold
Second Nature (aka La Diva)	Released: 18 October 2004; Label: Universal; Format: CD, digital download	16	1	—	—	—	48	—	—	16	BPI: Platinum
Living a Dream	Released: 31 October 2005; Label: Universal; Format: CD, digital download	4	1	13	15	—	—	13	—	—	BPI: Platinum; RMNZ: Gold
Serenade	Released: 6 November 2006; Label: Universal; Format: CD, digital download	5	1	92	20	—	92	—	—	—	BPI: Platinum
Rejoice	Released: 19 November 2007; Label: Universal; Format: CD, digital download	3	1	25	15	—	18	23	—	—	BPI: Platinum
Sacred Arias	Released: 20 October 2008; Label: Universal; Format: CD, digital download	5	1	—	20	—	47	—	—	—	BPI: Gold
Believe	Released: 26 October 2009; Label: Warner Bros.; Format: CD, digital download	6	1	35	24	10	13	—	—	5	BPI: Platinum; IRMA: Platinum
Daydream	Released: 17 October 2011; Label: Warner Bros.; Format: CD, digital download	6	1	78	—	—	12	29	—	—	BPI: Silver
This Is Christmas	Released: 30 October 2012; Label: Reprise; Format: CD, digital download	26	1	—	—	—	22	—	110	3	BPI: Gold
Home Sweet Home	Released: 17 November 2014; Label: Decca; Format: CD, digital download	10	1	—	—	—	21	—	—	—	BPI: Silver
Celebration	Released: 22 April 2016; Label: Decca; Format: CD, digital download	7	1	—	—	—	—	—	—	—	
Guiding Light	Released: 30 November 2018; Label: Decca; Format: CD, digital download	17	1	—	—	—	62	—	—	—	BPI: Silver
"—" denotes a recording that did not chart or was not released in that territory.

=== Soundtrack albums ===
Title	Details	Peak chart positions		
Title	Details	UK	UK Class	IRE
Cinema Paradiso	Released: 3 July 2020; Label: Decca; Format: CD, digital download	3	1	58
Christmas Spectacular from the Royal Albert Hall: Original Soundtrack	Released: 11 December 2020; Label: Decca; Format: CD, digital download, streaming	36	—	—

=== Compilation albums ===
Title	Details	Peak chart positions					Certifications (sales thresholds)
Title	Details	UK	UK Class	GER	IRE	US Class	Certifications (sales thresholds)
From the Heart	Released: 17 February 2009 (China only); Label: Polydor; Format: CD, digital download	—	—	—	—	—	
The Ultimate Collection	Released: 2 November 2009; Label: Decca; Format: CD, digital download	9	—	91	21	31	BPI: Platinum
Sweetest Love	Released: 14 March 2011; Label: Universal; Format: CD, digital download	199	—	—	22	—	
One Fine Day	Released: 3 October 2011; Label: Decca; Format: CD, digital download	17	—	—	43	19	BPI: Silver
My Christmas	Released: 9 October 2012; Label: Decca; Format: CD, digital download	—	6	8	—	—	
L'amour	Released: 1 February 2013; Label: Decca; Format: CD, digital download	—	—	—	—	—	
"—" denotes a recording that did not chart or was not released in that territory.

=== Video albums ===
Title	Details	Notes	Certifications
Live at Llangollen	Released: 4 December 2006; Label: Universal; Format: DVD	Jenkins sings live at the 2006 Llangollen International Eisteddfod, Wales	BPI: Gold; RMNZ: Gold
Katherine in the Park	Released: 19 November 2007; Label: Universal; Format: DVD	Live at Margam Park, Port Talbot, Wales; Also includes interviews	BPI: Gold
Viva la Diva	Released: 10 November 2008; Label: Warner Bros.; Format: DVD	With ballerina Darcey Bussell; Musical combining song and dance; Live at the O2 Arena London	
Katherine Jenkins: Believe Live from the O2	Released: 8 November 2010; Label: Eagle Vision; Format: DVD/Blu-ray	Live at the O2 Arena London; For several months before release, was available only through PBS as a thank you gift	

== Extended plays ==
Title	Details
iTunes Live from London	Released: 8 February 2010; Label: Warner Bros.; Formats: CD, digital download

== Singles ==
Title	Year	Peak chart positions		Album
Title	Year	UK	GER	Album
"Time to Say Goodbye"	2005	76	—	Second Nature
"Do Not Stand at My Grave & Weep"	2006	—	—	Living a Dream
"Green, Green Grass of Home"	2006	62	—	Serenade
"I (Who Have Nothing)"	2007	—	—	Rejoice
"Hallelujah"	2008	112	—	Sacred Arias
"I Believe" (with Andrea Bocelli)	2009	—	—	Believe
"Bring Me to Life"	2009	74	46	Believe
"Angel"	2009	—	—	Believe
"Love Never Dies"	2010	—	—	Believe
"Fear of Falling"	2010	—	—	Believe
"Tell Me I'm Not Dreaming"	2010	—	—	Believe
"We'll Meet Again" (with Vera Lynn)	2014	72	—	National Treasure: Ultimate Collection
"Together and Last (I Am Home)" (with Alexis Ffrench)	2023	—	—	non album single
"Home for Christmas"	2023	—	—	non album single
"What the World Needs Now Is Love" (with Jack Savoretti)	2023	—	—	non album single
"Flowers"	2025	—	—	
"Golden"	2025	—	—	
"—" denotes a recording that did not chart or was not released in that territory.

In 2011, four of Jenkins' singles appeared on the U.S. Classical Digital Songs chart: "Time to Say Goodbye" (#3), "The Flower Duet" (#7), "Hallelujah" (#17) and "O Mio Babbino Caro" (#19). In 2012, two of her singles appeared on the same chart: "Hallelujah" (#3) and "I Believe" with Andrea Bocelli (#13).

== Music videos ==
Title	Year	Director
"Time to Say Goodbye"	2004	
"L'Amore Sei Tu (I Will Always Love You)"	2005	
"Nella Fantasia"	2006	
"Rejoice"	2007	
"I (Who Have Nothing)"	2008	
"I Believe" (with Andrea Bocelli)	2009	
"Bring Me to Life"	2009	Trudy Bellinger
"Angel"	2009	Brett Sullivan
"Love Never Dies"	2010	
"Tell Me I'm Not Dreaming"	2010	
"Break It to My Heart"	2011	
