= List of Classical Artist Albums Chart number ones of the 2000s =

This is the list of the number-one albums of the Classical Artist Albums Chart during the 2000s.

== Number ones ==
Artist (Note: The artist, album, date of reaching number one and number of weeks at number one are those given by the Official Charts Company.)	Album	Record label	Reached number one (for the week ending)	Weeks at number one
2000
Charlotte Church	Charlotte Church	Sony Classical	27 November 1999	11
William Orbit	Pieces in a Modern Style	WEA International	12 February 2000	10
André Rieu	Celebration!	Philips	22 April 2000	3
William Orbit	Pieces in a Modern Style	WEA International	13 May 2000	2
Lesley Garrett	I Will Wait for You	BBC/BMG Conifer	27 May 2000	8
Andrea Bocelli	Sacred Arias	Philips	22 July 2000	9
Andrea Bocelli	Verdi	Philips	23 September 2000	2
Russell Watson	The Voice †	Decca	7 October 2000	21
2001
Nana Mouskouri	At Her Very Best	Philips	3 March 2001	1
Russell Watson	The Voice	Decca	10 March 2001	9
Nana Mouskouri	At Her Very Best	Philips	12 May 2001	1
Russell Watson	The Voice	Decca	19 May 2001	9
Luciano Pavarotti	Amore – The Love Album	Decca	21 July 2001	3
Russell Watson	The Voice	Decca	11 August 2001	10
Lesley Garrett	Gift Collection	Silva Treasury	20 October 2001	1
Maria Callas	Romantic Callas – The Best Of	EMI Classics	27 October 2001	2
Russell Watson	Encore †	Decca	10 November 2001	16
2002
The Planets	Classical Graffiti	EMI/Dramatico	2 March 2002	11
Russell Watson	Encore	Decca	18 May 2002	3
Operababes	Beyond Imagination	Sony Classical	8 June 2002	8
Russell Watson	Encore	Decca	3 August 2002	9
Izzy	New Dawn	Venture	5 October 2002	1
Russell Watson	Encore	Decca	12 October 2002	1
Berliner Philharmoniker/Simon Rattle	Mahler: Symphony No. 5	EMI Classics	19 October 2002	1
Aled Jones	Aled	UCJ	26 October 2002	3
Andrea Bocelli	Sentimento †	Philips	16 November 2002	2
Russell Watson	Reprise	Decca	30 November 2002	2
Andrea Bocelli	Sentimento †	Philips	14 December 2002	5
2003
Russell Watson	Reprise	Decca	18 January 2003	1
Andrea Bocelli	Sentimento	Philips	25 January 2003	8
D'Oyly Carte Opera Company	The Very Best of Gilbert & Sullivan	Decca	22 March 2003	1
Simon Rattle/Vienna Philharmonic	Beethoven: Symphonies	EMI Classics	29 March 2003	1
D'Oyly Carte Opera Company	The Very Best of Gilbert & Sullivan	Decca	5 April 2003	1
Choir of Clare College/Timothy Brown	John Rutter: Requiem	Naxos	12 April 2003	7
Andrea Bocelli	Sentimento	Philips	31 May 2003	2
Dominic Miller	Shapes	Philips	14 June 2003	3
José Carreras/Plácido Domingo/Luciano Pavarotti	The Best of the Three Tenors	Decca	5 July 2003	2
Dominic Miller	Shapes	Philips	19 July 2003	2
Karl Jenkins	The Armed Man: A Mass for Peace	Venture	2 August 2003	1
Dominic Miller	Shapes	Philips	9 August 2003	1
Juan Diego Florez	Una Furtiva Lagrima	Philips	16 August 2003	1
Karl Jenkins	The Armed Man: A Mass for Peace	Venture	23 August 2003	1
Juan Diego Florez	Una Furtiva Lagrima	Philips	30 August 2003	1
James Last	The Classical Collection	Philips	6 September 2003	1
Ludovico Einaudi	Echoes: The Einaudi Collection	BMG	13 September 2003	2
Hayley Westenra	Pure †	Decca	27 September 2003	7
Bryn Terfel	Bryn	Deutsche Grammophon	15 November 2003	3
Hayley Westenra	Pure †	Decca	6 December 2003	12
2004
Duel	Duel	Decca	28 February 2004	3
Hayley Westenra	Pure	Decca	20 March 2004	4
Katherine Jenkins	Premiere	UCJ	17 April 2004	7
Hayley Westenra	Pure	Decca	5 June 2004	1
Mario Lanza	The Definitive Collection	BMG	12 June 2004	9
Karl Jenkins	The Armed Man: A Mass for Peace	Venture	14 August 2004	1
Hayley Westenra	Pure	Decca	25 August 2004	3
Grimethorpe Colliery Band	The Very Best Of	BMG	11 September 2004	1
Ludovico Einaudi	Una Mattina	Decca	18 September 2004	1
James Galway	Wings of Song	Deutsche Grammophon	25 September 2004	5
Katherine Jenkins	Second Nature †	UCJ	30 October 2004	1
Russell Watson	Amore Musica	Decca	6 November 2004	1
Katherine Jenkins	Second Nature †	UCJ	13 November 2004	5
Aled Jones	The Christmas Album	UCJ	18 December 2004	2
2005
Katherine Jenkins	Second Nature	UCJ	1 January 2005	10
Aled Jones	Aled	UCJ	12 March 2005	3
Katherine Jenkins	Second Nature	UCJ	2 April 2005	4
Karl Jenkins	Requiem	EMI Classics	30 April 2005	1
Information missing
Katherine Jenkins	Second Nature	UCJ	10 September 2005	2
Andreas Scholl	Arias for Senesino	Decca	24 September 2005	1
Karl Jenkins	Requiem	EMI Classics	1 October 2005	1
Hayley Westenra	Odyssey	Decca	8 October 2005	2
Bryn Terfel	Simple Gifts	Deutsche Grammophon	22 October 2005	3
Katherine Jenkins	Living a Dream †	UCJ	12 November 2005	7
The Choirboys	The Choirboys	UCJ	31 December 2005	1
2006
Katherine Jenkins	Living a Dream	UCJ	7 January 2006	9
Katherine Jenkins	Second Nature	UCJ	11 March 2006	2
Russell Watson	The Voice: The Ultimate Collection	Decca	25 March 2006	5
Hayley Westenra	Odyssey	Decca	29 April 2006	10
The Choirboys	The Choirboys	UCJ	8 July 2006	2
Katherine Jenkins	Second Nature	UCJ	22 July 2006	3
Katherine Jenkins	Living a Dream	UCJ	12 August 2006	5
Berliner Philharmoniker/Simon Rattle	Holst: The Planets	EMI Classics	16 September 2006	1
Bryn Terfel	Tutto Mozart	Deutsche Grammophon	23 September 2006	2
Katherine Jenkins	Living a Dream	UCJ	7 October 2006	1
Sarah Brightman	Classics: The Best of Sarah Brightman	EMI Classics	14 October 2006	1
Sting	Songs from the Labyrinth	Deutsche Grammophon	21 October 2006	4
Katherine Jenkins	Serenade	UCJ	18 November 2006	3
Fron Male Voice Choir	Voices of the Valley †	UCJ	9 December 2006	10
2007
Katherine Jenkins	Serenade	UCJ	17 February 2007	1
Fron Male Voice Choir	Voices of the Valley	UCJ	24 February 2007	1
Natasha Marsh	Amour	EMI Classics	3 March 2007	1
Hayley Westenra	Treasure	Decca	10 March 2007	3
Fron Male Voice Choir	Voices of the Valley	UCJ	31 March 2007	4
Garðar Thór Cortes	Cortes	Believer	28 April 2007	3
Luciano Pavarotti	Nessun Dorma	Hallmark	19 May 2007	1
Katherine Jenkins	Serenade	UCJ	26 May 2007	4
Alfie Boe	Onward	EMI Classics	23 June 2007	2
Katherine Jenkins	Second Nature	UCJ	7 July 2007	1
Andrea Bocelli	Viaggo Italiano	Philips	14 July 2007	2
Mario Lanza	The Collection	The Red Box	28 July 2007	7
Katherine Jenkins	Second Nature	UCJ	1 September 2007	3
Luciano Pavarotti	The Ultimate Collection	UCJ	22 September 2007	5
Luciano Pavarotti	Icons	Icons	27 October 2007	2
Luciano Pavarotti	The Ultimate Collection	UCJ	10 November 2007	1
Blake	Blake	UCJ	17 November 2007	2
Fron Male Voice Choir	Voices of the Valley: Encore †	UCJ	1 December 2007	3
Royal Scots Dragoon Guards	Spirit of the Glen	UCJ	22 December 2007	8
2008
Luciano Pavarotti	Love Songs	Decca	16 February 2008	2
Jonathan Ansell	Tenor at the Movies	UCJ	20 January 2008	4
Mike Oldfield	Music of the Spheres	UCJ	29 March 2008	8
Blake	Blake	UCJ	24 May 2008	1
The Cistercian Monks of Stift Heiligenkreuz	Chant: Music for Paradise	UCJ	31 May 2008	15
Benedictine Monks of Santo Domingo de Silos	Sacred Chants	Metro	13 September 2008	1
The Cistercian Monks of Stift Heiligenkreuz	Chant: Music for Paradise	UCJ	20 September 2008	1
Bryn Terfel	First Love: Songs from the British Isles	Deutsche Grammophon	27 September 2008	1
Will Martin	A New World	UCJ	4 October 2008	3
Bryn Terfel	First Love: Songs from the British Isles	Deutsche Grammophon	25 October 2008	1
Katherine Jenkins	Sacred Arias	UCJ	1 November 2008	2
Andrea Bocelli	Incanto	Decca	15 November 2008	1
Fron Male Voice Choir	Voices of the Valley: Home	UCJ	22 November 2008	2
The Priests	The Priests †	Epic	6 December 2008	10
2009
Tyler Rix	Ascent	UCJ	14 February 2009	1
The Priests	The Priests	Epic	21 February 2009	3
Angela Gheorghiu/Antonio Pappano	Puccini: Madama Butterfly	EMI Classics	14 March 2009	1
Faryl	Faryl	Decca	21 March 2009	10
Katherine Jenkins	Serenade – Deluxe Edition	UCJ	30 May 20,069	2
The Priests	The Priests	Epic	13 June 2009	4
Katherine Jenkins	Premiere	UCJ	11 July 2009	3
Royal Scots Dragoon Guards	Spirit of the Glen: Journey	UCJ	1 August 2009	1
Katherine Jenkins	Premiere	UCJ	8 August 2009	1
King's College Choir	England My England	EMI Classics	15 August 2009	1
Royal Scots Dragoon Guards	Spirit of the Glen: Journey	UCJ	22 August 2009	1
Royal Scots Dragoon Guards	Spirit of the Glen	UCJ	29 August 2009	2
Hayley Westenra	Treasure	Decca	12 September 2009	1
Nicola Benedetti	Fantasie	Deutsche Grammophon	19 September 2009	2
Katherine Jenkins	Second Nature	UCJ	3 October 2009	2
Ludovico Einaudi	Nightbook	Decca	17 October 2009	1
Only Men Aloud	Band of Brothers	Decca	24 October 2009	3
Katherine Jenkins	The Ultimate Collection †	Decca	14 November 2009	3
The Priests	Harmony	Epic	5 December 2009	1
Coldstream Guards Band	Heroes	Decca	12 December 2009	4

== See also ==
- List of UK Albums Chart number ones of the 2000s
