= List of Classical Artist Albums Chart number ones of the 2020s =

This is the list of the number-one albums of the Classical Artist Albums Chart during the 2020s.

== Number ones ==
Artist (Note: The artist, album, date of reaching number one and number of weeks at number one are those given by the Official Charts Company.)	Album	Record label (Note: The record labels are those given by the Official Charts Company.)	Reached number one	Weeks at number one
2020
André Rieu and The Johann Strauss Orchestra	Happy Days	Decca	5 December 2019	7
Sheku Kanneh-Mason, the London Symphony Orchestra and Sir Simon Rattle	Elgar	Decca	17 January 2020	5
André Rieu and The Johann Strauss Orchestra	Happy Days	Decca	21 February 2020	1
Stephen Fry, Debbie Wiseman and the National Symphony Orchestra	The Mythos Suite	Decca	28 February 2020	1
André Rieu and The Johann Strauss Orchestra	Happy Days	Decca	6 March 2020	3
Alexis Ffrench	Dreamland	Sony Classical	27 March 2020	1
Hania Rani	Esja	Gondwana	3 April 2020	1
Ludovico Einaudi	Islands – Essential	Decca	10 April 2020	4
Stephen Hough/Finnish Radio Symphony Orchestra/Hannu Lintu	Beethoven: Piano Concertos	Hyperion	8 May 2020	1
Ludovico Einaudi	Islands – Essential	Decca	15 May 2020	8
Katherine Jenkins	Cinema Paradiso	Decca	10 July 2020	4
Max Richter	Voices	Decca	7 August 2020	1
Nicola Benedetti	Elgar/Violin Concerto	Decca	13 August 2020	1
Anne-Sophie Mutter/John Williams and Vienna Philharmonic	John Williams Live in Vienna	Deutsche Grammophon	20 August 2020	1
Ludovico Einaudi	Islands – Essential	Decca	27 August 2020	1
Craig Armstrong/Calum Martin	The Edge of the Sea	BMG	4 September 2020	1
Ludovico Einaudi	Islands – Essential	Decca	11 September 2020	1
Max Richter	Sleep	Deutsche Grammophon	18 September 2020	1
Ludovico Einaudi	Undiscovered	Decca	25 September 2020	1
Jess Gillam	Time	Decca	2 October 2020	1
Royal Philharmonic Orchestra	Disney Goes Classical	Decca	9 October 2020	1
Ludovico Einaudi	Islands – Essential	Decca	16 October 2020	1
Poor Clares of Arundel	Light for the World	Decca	23 October 2020	1
Russell Watson	20	BMG	30 October 2020	2
Aled Jones	Blessings	BMG	13 November 2020	1
Andrea Bocelli	Believe	Decca	20 November 2020	1
André Rieu	Jolly Holiday	Decca	27 November 2020	3
Andrea Bocelli	Believe	Decca	24 December 2020	3
2021
Aled Jones	Blessings	BMG	8 January 2021	1
Andrea Bocelli	Believe	Decca	15 January 2021	1
Poor Clares of Arundel	Light for the World	Decca	22 January 2021	4
Max Richter	Sleep	Deutsche Grammophon	19 February 2021	2
Fron Male Voice Choir	Voices of the Valley Echoes	Silva Classics	5 March 2021	1
Pat Metheny	Road to the Sun	BMG	12 March 2021	1
Max Richter	Sleep	Deutsche Grammophon	19 March 2021	4
Max Richter	Voices 2	Decca	16 April 2021	1
Freddie De Tommaso/London Philharmonic Orchestra/Renato Balsadonna	Passione	Decca	23 April 2021	1
Max Richter	Sleep	Deutsche Grammophon	30 April 2021	1
Ludovico Einaudi	Islands – Essential	Decca	7 May 2021	1
Max Richter	Sleep	Deutsche Grammophon	14 May 2021	1
Ludovico Einaudi	Islands – Essential	Decca	21 May 2021	3
Ludovico Einaudi	Cinema	Decca	11 June 2021	1
Helen Mirren/Damian Lewis	Wisemen/The Music of Kings & Queens	Classic FM	18 June 2021	1
Ludovico Einaudi	Cinema	Decca	25 June 2021	2
Ludovico Einaudi	Islands – Essential	Decca	9 July 2021	2
Nicola Benedetti	Baroque	Decca	23 July 2021	1
Ludovico Einaudi	Islands – Essential	Decca	30 July 2021	2
Max Richter/Baltic Sea Philharmonic/Kristjan Järvi	Exiles	Deutsche Grammophon	13 August 2021	1
Ludovico Einaudi	Islands – Essential	Decca	20 August 2021	1
Sean Shibe	Camino	Pentatone	27 August 2021	1
Ludovico Einaudi	Islands – Essential	Decca	3 September 2021	1
Víkingur Ólafsson	Mozart & Contemporaries	Deutsche Grammophon	10 September 2021	1
Andrea Bocelli	Concerto: One Night in Central Park	Decca	17 September 2021	1
Ludovico Einaudi	Islands – Essential	Decca	24 September 2021	2
Hans Zimmer	No Time To Die - OST	Decca	8 October 2021	4
Andrew Lloyd Webber Orchestra	Symphonic Suites	Decca	5 November 2021	1
Sheku Kanneh-Mason and Isata Kanneh-Mason	Muse	Decca	12 November 2021	1
Ludovico Einaudi	Islands – Essential	Decca	19 November 2021	1
André Rieu and The Johann Strauss Orchestra	Happy Together	Decca	26 November 2021	8
2022
Ludovico Einaudi	Islands – Essential	Decca	21 January 2022	1
Ludovico Einaudi	Underwater	Decca	28 January 2022	4
Ludovico Einaudi	Islands – Essential	Decca	25 February 2022	4
Ludovico Einaudi	Underwater	Decca	25 March 2022	1
Max Richter	Sleep	Deutsche Grammophon	1 April 2022	1
Hannah Peel/Paraorchestra	The Unfolding	Real World	8 April 2022	1
Ludovico Einaudi	Islands – Essential	Decca	15 April 2022	9
Max Richter	The New Four Seasons – Recomposed Vivaldi Recomposed	Deutsche Grammophon	17 June 2022	2
Freddie De Tommaso/Philharmonia Orchestra/Paolo Arrivabeni	Il Tenore	Decca	1 July 2022	1
Max Richter	Sleep	Deutsche Grammophon	8 July 2022	2
Ludovico Einaudi	Islands – Essential	Decca	22 July 2022	1
Max Richter	Sleep	Deutsche Grammophon	29 July 2022	2
Ludovico Einaudi	Islands – Essential	Decca	12 August 2022	1
Max Richter	Sleep	Deutsche Grammophon	19 August 2022	2
Alison Balsom	Quiet City	Warner Classics	2 September 2022	1
Max Richter	Sleep	Deutsche Grammophon	9 September 2022	1
Sheku Kanneh-Mason	Song	Decca	16 September 2022	1
Max Richter	Sleep	Deutsche Grammophon	23 September 2022	1
Royal Philharmonic Orchestra	Bond 25	Decca	30 September 2022	2
Max Richter	Sleep	Deutsche Grammophon	14 October 2022	1
Ludovico Einaudi	Islands – Essential	Decca	21 October 2022	4
Aled Jones and Russell Watson	Christmas with Aled and Russell	BMG	18 November 2022	1
André Rieu and The Johann Strauss Orchestra	Silver Bells	Decca	25 November 2022	7
2023
Ludovico Einaudi	Islands – Essential	Decca	13 January 2023	7
Rhydian Roberts	Classical Album - Hymns and Arias	Futura Records	3 March 2023	1
André Rieu and The Johann Strauss Orchestra	My Music My World - The Very Best Of	Decca	10 March 2023	1
Orchestra dell'Accademia Nazionale di Santa Cecilia and Antonio Pappano	Puccini/Turandot	Warner Classics	17 March 2023	1
Ludovico Einaudi	Islands – Essential	Decca	24 March 2023	9
Max Richter	Sleep	Deutsche Grammophon	26 May 2023	1
Ludovico Einaudi	Islands – Essential	Decca	2 June 2023	1
Max Richter	Sleep	Deutsche Grammophon	9 June 2023	1
Rob Grant	Lost At Sea	Decca	16 June 2023	1
Max Richter	Sleep	Deutsche Grammophon	23 June 2023	2
Debbie Wiseman/City of Birmingham Symphony Orchestra	Signature	Silva Classics	7 July 2023	1
Karl Jenkins	One World	Decca	14 July 2023	1
Ludovico Einaudi	Islands – Essential	Decca	21 July 2023	1
Malakai	Golden	Decca	28 July 2023	3
Ludovico Einaudi	Islands – Essential	Decca	18 August 2023	5
Sinfonia of London/John Wilson	Rodgers and Hammerstein's Oklahoma! - OST	Chandos	28 September 2023	1
Ludovico Einaudi	Islands – Essential	Decca	5 October 2023	1
Anna Lapwood	Luna	Sony Classical	12 October 2023	1
Víkingur Ólafsson	J.S Bach/Goldberg Variations	Deutsche Grammophon	19 October 2023	1
Ludovico Einaudi	Islands – Essential	Decca	26 October 2023	2
Aled Jones	One Voice: Full Circle	Decca	9 November 2023	3
André Rieu and The Johann Strauss Orchestra	Jewels of Romance	Decca	24 November 2023	8
2024
Ludovico Einaudi	Islands – Essential	Decca	19 January 2024	7
Lang Lang/Andris Nelsons/Leipzig Gewandhaus Orchestra	Saint-Saëns	Deutsche Grammophon	8 March 2024	1
Ludovico Einaudi	Islands – Essential	Decca	15 March 2024	2
Poor Clares of Arundel	Light for the World	Decca	29 March 2024	1
Ludovico Einaudi	Islands – Essential	Decca	5 April 2024	2
André Rieu and The Johann Strauss Orchestra	Love Is All Around	Decca	19 April 2024	1
Ludovico Einaudi	Islands – Essential	Decca	26 April 2024	5
Poor Clares of Arundel	My Peace I Give You	Decca	31 May 2024	1
Nicola Benedetti/Benjamin Grosvenor	Beethoven/Triple Concerto	Decca	7 June 2024	1
Ludovico Einaudi	Islands – Essential	Decca	14 June 2024	13
Max Richter	In a Landscape	Decca	13 September 2024	1
Ludovico Einaudi	Islands – Essential	Decca	20 September 2024	1
Erland Cooper	Carve the Runes Then Be Content With	Mercury	27 September 2024	1
Alexis Ffrench	Classical Soul Vol.1	Sony Classical	4 October 2024	1
Ludovico Einaudi	Islands – Essential	Decca	11 October 2024	7
Alan Titchmarsh/Debbie Wiseman	Jack Frost – A Winter Story	Silva Classics	29 November 2024	2
André Rieu and Johann Strauss Orchestra	The Sound of Heaven	Decca	13 December 2024	6
2025
Ludovico Einaudi	Islands – Essential	Decca	24 January 2025	2
Ludovico Einaudi	The Summer Portraits	Decca	7 February 2025	4
Ludovico Einaudi	Islands – Essential	Decca	7 March 2025	3
André Rieu and Johann Strauss Orchestra	The Sound of Heaven	Decca	3 April 2025	2
Ludovico Einaudi	Islands – Essential	Decca	17 April 2025	8
Anna Lapwood	Firedove	Sony Classical	6 June 2025	1
Brad Kella	Phoebe's Melody	Modern Sky	13 June 2025	1
Ludovico Einaudi	Islands – Essential	Decca	20 June 2025	2
Ludovico Einaudi	The Summer Portraits	Decca	4 July 2025	1
Ludovico Einaudi	Islands – Essential	Decca	11 July 2025	9
Max Richter	Sleep Circle	Decca	12 September 2025	1
Kanneh Masons	River of Music	Decca	19 September 2025	1
Ludovico Einaudi	Islands – Essential	Decca	26 September 2025	7
André Rieu and Johann Strauss Orchestra	Thank You Johann Strauss	Decca	14 November 2025	2
Víkingur Ólafsson	Opus 109	Deutsche Grammophon	28 November 2025	1
André Rieu and Johann Strauss Orchestra	Thank You Johann Strauss	Decca	5 December 2025	2
Choir of King's College, Cambridge	25 Carols for Christmas	Decca	19 December 2025	1
Choir of King's College, Cambridge	Christmas Carols	Decca	26 December 2025	2
2026
Ludovico Einaudi	Islands – Essential	Decca	9 January 2026	3
Max Richter	Sleep	Deutsche Grammophon	30 January 2026	1
Ludovico Einaudi	Islands – Essential	Decca	6 February 2026	1
Max Richter	Sleep	Deutsche Grammophon	13 February 2026	1
Ludovico Einaudi	Islands – Essential	Decca	20 February 2026	2
Ludovico Einaudi	Solo Piano	Decca	6 March 2026	25
Philharmonic Orchestra/Dudel	Hopkins/Life is a Dream	Decca	28 August 2026	1
Ludovico Einaudi	Solo Piano	Decca	4 September 2026	6
Jess Gillam	Shine	Decca	16 October 2026	1
Max Richter	While the Flood Rages	Decca	23 October 2026	1
Ludovico Einaudi	Solo Piano	Decca	30 October 2026	3

=== By artist ===
Eight artists have spent six or more weeks at the top of the Classical Artist Albums Chart during the 2020s. The totals below include only credited performances.

Artist	Number-one albums	Weeks at number one
Ludovico Einaudi	6	193
Johann Strauss Orchestra	8	48
Max Richter	6	31
André Rieu	9	32
Sheku Kanneh-Mason	3	7
Andrea Bocelli	2	6
Aled Jones	3	6
Poor Clares of Arundel	2	7

=== By record label ===
As of 23 October 2026, Fifteen record labels have released chart-topping albums so far during the 2020s.

Record label	Number-one albums	Weeks at number one
Decca	48	287
Deutsche Grammophon	8	31
BMG	5	7
Sony Classical	4	4
Gondwana	1	1
Hyperion	1	1
Silva Classics	3	4
Classic FM	1	1
Pentatone	1	1
Real World	1	1
Warner Classics	2	2
Futura Records	1	1
Chandos	1	1
Mercury	1	1
Modern Sky	1	1

== See also ==
- List of UK Albums Chart number ones of the 2020s
