= Kanneh-Mason =

Kanneh-Mason is a surname. Notable people with the surname include:

- Sheku Kanneh-Mason (born 1999), British cellist
- Isata Kanneh-Mason (born 1996), British pianist
- Kadiatu Kanneh-Mason (born 1965 or 1966), British memoirist and arts administrator

== See also ==
- Kanneh
- Mason (surname)
