= Rejoice =

"Rejoice" may refer to:

- Happiness

== Music ==
- Rejoice Broadcast Network, a Christian radio network
- Rejoice Records

=== Albums ===
- Rejoice (The Emotions album) (1977)
- Rejoice (Katherine Jenkins album) (2007)
- Rejoice (Pharoah Sanders album) (1981)
- Rejoice (2nd Chapter of Acts album) (1981)
- Rejoice, a 2008 album by Sawyer Brown
- Rejoice (Tony Allen and Hugh Masekela album) (2020)

=== Songs ===
- "Rejoice" (Il Divo song) (2005)
- "Rejoice", a 2007 Andrew Jackson Jihad song from People That Can Eat People Are the Luckiest People in the World
- "Rejoice", a 1971 song by Rod Argent from Ring of Hands
- "Rejoice", a 2001 song by Audio Adrenaline from Lift
- "Rejoice", a 2015 song by Audio Adrenaline from Sound of the Saints
- "Rejoice", a 2014 song by Devin Townsend Project from Z²
- "Rejoice", a 1981 song by U2 from October

== Given name ==
- Rejoice Kapfumvuti (born 1991), Zimbabwean footballer
- Rejoice Mabudafhasi (born 1943), South African politician

== Other uses ==
- "Rejoice" (Margaret Thatcher), a 1982 remark made by the British prime minister
- Rejoice, a hair care brand owned by Procter & Gamble, particularly popular in the Asian market
