= Kanneh =

Kanneh is a surname. Notable people with the surname include:

- Abdul Kanneh (born 1990), English player of Canadian football
- Abu Kanneh (born 1983), Liberian footballer
- Ansuh Kanneh (born 2005), Liberian-born American soccer player
- Isata Kanneh-Mason (born 1996), British pianist
- Mohamed Kanneh (born 1991), Liberian footballer
- Sheku Kanneh-Mason (born 1999), British cellist
