= Sacred Arias =

Sacred Arias may refer to:

- Sacred Arias (Andrea Bocelli album)
- Sacred Arias (Katherine Jenkins album)
