= Tyler Rix =

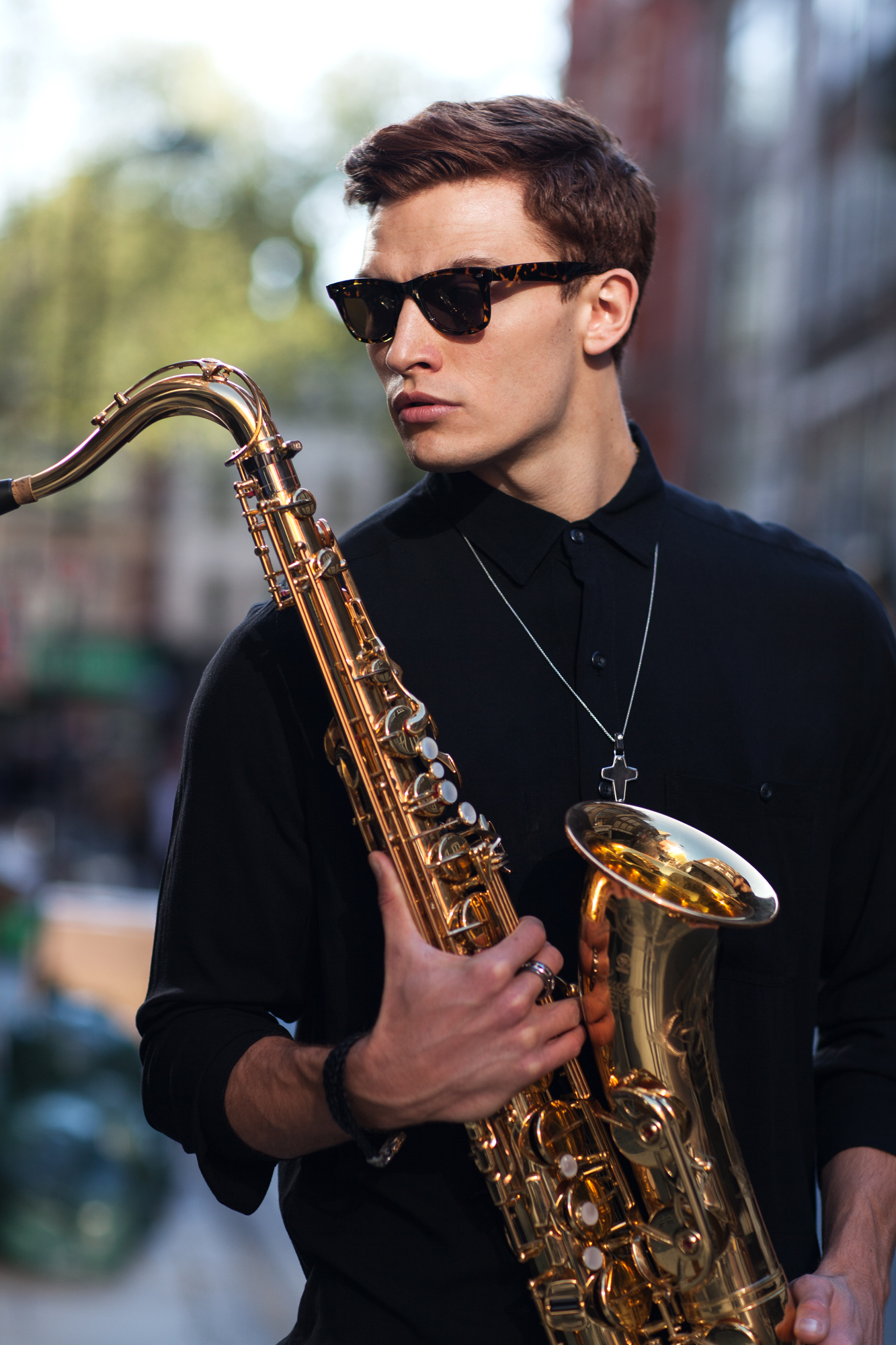
- Tyler Rix - shooting for Man London Magazine

Background information
- Born: Tyler Pearce Rix; 2 January 1993 (age 33)
- Origin: Watford, England, United Kingdom
- Genres: Jazz, Funk, Blues, Pop
- Occupations: Musician, ex footballer International Model
- Instruments: Vocals, saxophone, piano
- Years active: 2008–present
- Label: Universal Classics and Jazz
- Website: www.tylerrixofficial.com www.tylerrix.info

Tyler Rix (born 2 January 1993) is a British singer, musician, and model.

== Career ==
Tyler appeared on the BBC's Classical Star competition aged 14. In 2009 Rix signed to Universal Classics and Jazz and his recording, Ascent, was released in January 2009 containing a collection of old and new classical pieces. Released initially as an EP, it was released as a full-length recording in February 2009.

Tyler formed The Tyler Rix quartet age 15 which went on to perform at the Vortex in the London Jazz Festival on 22 November 2008.

In January 2001, at the age of 8, Rix signed for West Ham United Academy. The following year, he appeared on the front cover of the book, Junior Soccer: A Complete Coaching Guide for the Young Player, a coaching guide produced in association with West Ham. In April 2007 Rix played for Dame Alice Owen's School with whom he won the English Schools' FA National Cup.

He was the final torchbearer on the day before the London 2012 Olympic Games, lighting the cauldron on stage in Hyde Park at the Olympic Torch Relay Finale Celebration on 27 July 2012 in front of a crowd of 80,000 people.

In June 2024, he made a guest appearance in "GUESS THE MUSICIAN!", a popular YouTube video hosted by Miniminter, in which Miniminter, Danny Aarons, George Clarkey and Specs Gonzalez attempted to identify musicians through a series questions.
