= One Fine Day (Katherine Jenkins album) =

Compilation album by Katherine Jenkins
- Released: 30 September 2011
- Genre: Classical
- Label: Decca Records

Katherine Jenkins chronology
Sweetest Love (2011)	One Fine Day (2011)	Daydream (2011)

One Fine Day is a compilation album by Welsh mezzo-soprano singer Katherine Jenkins. It was released in the United Kingdom on 30 September 2011 as a Digital download and on 3 October 2011 as a CD. It peaked to number 43 on the Irish Albums Chart.

In the Billboard week 21 April 2012 (which was first posted online on 12 April 2012), after Jenkins began to appear on Dancing with the Stars, the album entered the U.S. Classical Albums chart at #22.

Jenkins has explicitly stated that she does not want fans to buy this album, which contains no new material and was released by her previous record company, out of her control.

== Track listing ==
No.	Title	Length
1.	"Ave Maria" (Album Version)	3:52
2.	"One Fine Day" (Un Bel Di)	4:14
3.	"Music Of The Night"	5:45
4.	"Requiem for a Soldier"	3:45
5.	"I've Dreamed Of You" (Questo e per te)	3:35
6.	"Nessun Dorma"	2:50
7.	"Barcarolle"	2:15
8.	"The Prayer" (Album Version)	4:37
9.	"Shout In Silence"	4:45
10.	"The Lord Is My Shepherd"	4:22
11.	"O Mio Babbino Caro" (Album Version)	2:35
12.	"Sancta Maria"	3:48
13.	"Panis Angelicus"	2:38
14.	"O Sole Mio"	3:16
15.	"Va Pensiero"	3:45

== Chart performance ==
Chart (2011)	Peak position
Irish Albums Chart	43

It also charted at #21 on the Billboard U.S. Classical Albums chart for the "Week of May 26, 2012" and at #22 on that chart for the "Week of April 21, 2012"

== Certifications ==
Region	Certification	Certified units/sales
United Kingdom (BPI)	Silver	60,000^{‡}
^{‡} Sales+streaming figures based on certification alone.

== Release history ==
Region	Date	Format	Label
United Kingdom	30 September 2011	Digital download	Decca
United Kingdom	3 October 2011	CD	Decca
