= Live at Llangollen =

Video by Katherine Jenkins
- Released: 4 December 2006
- Recorded: 9 July 2006
- Genre: Classical
- Label: Universal Classics & Jazz

Katherine Jenkins chronology
Live at Llangollen (2006)	Katherine in the Park (2007)

Live at Llangollen is a live concert video by Welsh mezzo-soprano Katherine Jenkins, which was released on DVD on 4 December 2006. The concert was filmed at the Llangollen International Musical Eisteddfod on 9 July 2006.

The concert features the tenor Nicky Spence as a special guest, Anthony Inglis and the National Symphony Orchestra. The DVD also features all of Jenkins' previous promotional videos, made available for the first time, and a rendition of "You'll Never Walk Alone" from the BBC archives.

== Track listing ==
1. "Introduction"
2. "Ruslan and Lyudmila Overture"
3. "L'Amore Sei Tu" ("I Will Always Love You")
4. "O mio babbino caro"
5. "Cymru Fach"
6. "Maria" (from West Side Story)
7. "All I Ask of You" (from The Phantom of the Opera)
8. "O Sole Mio"
9. "Dafyff y Garreg Wen" ("David of the White Rock")
10. "Be My Love"
11. "Carmen Overture and Prelude"
12. "Habanera" (from Carmen)
13. "Seguedilla" (from Carmen)
14. "Chanson Boheme" (from Carmen)
15. "Somewhere Over the Rainbow"
16. "Time to Say Goodbye"
17. "Calon Lân"
18. "The National Anthem"
19. "Hen Wlad Fy Nhadau" ("Land of My Fathers")

Bonus material

1. "Questo e per te"
2. "Time to Say Goodbye"
3. "L'Amore Sei Tu" ("I Will Always Love You")
4. "Quello che farò"
5. "You'll Never Walk Alone"

== Charts ==
Chart (2006)	Peak position
UK Music Videos (Official Charts)	11

== Certifications ==
Region	Certification	Certified units/sales
New Zealand (RMNZ)	Gold	2,500^{^}
United Kingdom (BPI)	Gold	25,000^{*}
^{*} Sales figures based on certification alone.^{^} Shipments figures based on certification alone.
