= Rejoice (Il Divo song) =

Single by Il Divo

from the album The Christmas Collection
- Genre: Christmas carols, Christmas songs

Rejoice, is a song written Wayne Héctor and by Steve McCutcheon alias Steve Mac, in 2005, original for the group of crossover classical Il Divo.

The song, was written like a Christmas songs, that includes in disk The Christmas Collection of Il Divo, published on October 25, 2005.

== Versions ==
- Il Divo, original version, in 2005, from album The Christmas Collection.
- Katherine Jenkins made a version of the song in 2009, from album Rejoice.
