= Sweetest Love =

Compilation album by Katherine Jenkins
- Released: 14 March 2011
- Recorded: 2010–11
- Genre: Classical
- Label: Spectrum Music

Katherine Jenkins chronology
The Ultimate Collection (2009)	Sweetest Love (2011)	One Fine Day (2011)

Sweetest Love is a compilation album by Welsh mezzo-soprano singer Katherine Jenkins. It was released in the United Kingdom on 14 March 2011 as a Digital download and CD. It peaked at number 199 on the UK Albums Chart and number 22 on the Irish Albums Chart.

== Track listing ==
No.	Title	Length
1.	"The Flower Duet (feat. Kiri Te Kanawa)"	3:50
2.	"Somewhere Over the Rainbow" (Live - Edit)	4:11
3.	"Sweetest Love"	3:56
4.	"The Prayer"	4:36
5.	"Rejoice"	3:13
6.	"Kiss from a Rose"	4:49
7.	"Absence"	3:00
8.	"En Aranjuez con Tu Amor"	4:06
9.	"Habanera"	2:48
10.	"Questo e Per Te"	3:36
11.	"In Paradisum"	3:12
12.	"Bailero"	2:49
13.	"Cinema Paradiso (Se)"	3:22
14.	"Pachelbel's Canon"	4:04

== Chart performance ==
Chart (2011)	Peak position
Irish Albums Chart	22
UK Albums Chart	199

== Release history ==
Region	Date	Format	Label
United Kingdom	14 March 2011	Digital download	Spectrum Music
United Kingdom	14 March 2011	CD	Spectrum Music
