= List of Specialist Classical Albums Chart number ones of the 2000s =

This is the list of the number-one albums of the Specialist Classical Albums Chart during the 2000s.

== Number ones ==
Artist (Note: The artist, album, date of reaching number one and number of weeks at number one are those given by the Official Charts Company.)	Album	Record label	Reached number one (for the week ending)	Weeks at number one
2009
Karl Jenkins and Adiemus Singers	Stella Natalis	EMI Classics	28 November 2009	2
Alma Mater featuring the voice of Pope Benedict XVI	Music From the Vatican	Polydor	12 December 2009	2

== See also ==
- List of UK Albums Chart number ones of the 2000s
