= A Family Christmas (Bocelli album) =

2022 album by Andrea, Matteo, and Virginia Bocelli

Studio album by Andrea Bocelli, Matteo Bocelli, Virginia Bocelli
- Released: 22 October 2022
- Recorded: 2022
- Genre: Christmas music
- Label: Decca
- Producer: Stephan Moccio

Andrea Bocelli chronology
Believe (2020)	A Family Christmas (2022)	Duets (30th Anniversary) (2024)

A Family Christmas is an album released in 2022 by Italian tenor, Andrea Bocelli collaborating with his two children Matteo Bocelli and Virginia Bocelli.

The album is a collection of Christmas songs sung by Bocelli and his children, containing solos, duets and trio with some songs sung in English and some in Italian.

Following the success of the album, a deluxe edition was released in the following year in 2023, containing 9 extra tracks including a song in collaboration with Pentatonix and one with The Simpsons.

== Development ==
The album is the first family album of Andrea Bocelli performing along with his 24-year-old son Matteo and 10-year old daughter Virginia. The album was the best-selling christmas album of 2022.

The family appeared in several interviews together talking about the development of the album and their inspirations for the songs, including a special segment on Classic FM that was broadcast on December 25, 2022.

=== Deluxe Edition ===
Following the success of the original release, a deluxe edition was released in 2023, which added nine new songs to the original 13 songs for a total of 22 songs. The edition also includes a special version of "Do You Hear What I Hear?" in collaboration with the a cappella group Pentatonix and a special version of "Feliz Navidad" with The Simpsons.

== Video recordings ==
=== A Bocelli Family Christmas documentary music film ===
Alongside the album, a 37-minute music video documentary with the recording of the songs was released on streaming platforms titled "A Bocelli Family Christmas" featuring songs from the album by the three artists (as well as two songs from Andrea’s 2009 Christmas album), alongside the rest of the Bocelli family. The video was shot at Castel Savoia, Gressoney in Valle D’Aosta, Italy.

=== The Simpsons special short ===
Disney+ released a special short episode of The Simpsons on December 15, 2022, titled The Simpsons Meet the Bocellis in "Feliz Navidad" in which Homer surprises Marge with a special gift of the Bocelli family performing for them.

== Track listing ==
=== Original release ===
A Family Christmas (2022)
No.	Title	Artist(s)	Length
1.	"Do You Hear What I Hear?"	Andrea Bocelli, Matteo Bocelli, Virginia Bocelli	2:59
2.	"Away In A Manger"	Andrea Bocelli, Matteo Bocelli, Virginia Bocelli	2:38
3.	"Feliz Navidad"	Andrea Bocelli, Matteo Bocelli, Virginia Bocelli	2:00
4.	"The First Noël"	Andrea Bocelli	4:03
5.	"Have Yourself A Merry Little Christmas"	Andrea Bocelli, Matteo Bocelli	4:03
6.	"Over The Rainbow"	Andrea Bocelli, Matteo Bocelli	2:29
7.	"Buon Natale A Tutto Il Mondo"	Andrea Bocelli	3:07
8.	"Joy To The World"	Andrea Bocelli, Matteo Bocelli, Virginia Bocelli	3:03
9.	"The Greatest Gift"	Andrea Bocelli, Matteo Bocelli, Virginia Bocelli	4:02
10.	"When Christmas Comes To Town"	Virginia Bocelli	3:39
11.	"Happy Xmas (War Is Over)"	Matteo Bocelli, Virginia Bocelli	3:32
12.	"Il Giorno Più Speciale"	Andrea Bocelli, Matteo Bocelli, Virginia Bocelli	3:16
13.	"I'll Be Home For Christmas"	Matteo Bocelli	3:12

=== Deluxe Edition (2023) ===
A Family Christmas (Deluxe Edition)
No.	Title	Artist(s)	Length
1.	"Do You Hear What I Hear?"	Andrea Bocelli, Matteo Bocelli, Virginia Bocelli	2:59
2.	"Away In A Manger"	Andrea Bocelli, Matteo Bocelli, Virginia Bocelli	2:38
3.	"Feliz Navidad"	Andrea Bocelli, Matteo Bocelli, Virginia Bocelli	2:00
4.	"The First Noël"	Andrea Bocelli	4:03
5.	"Have Yourself A Merry Little Christmas"	Andrea Bocelli, Matteo Bocelli	4:03
6.	"Over The Rainbow"	Andrea Bocelli, Matteo Bocelli	2:29
7.	"Buon Natale A Tutto Il Mondo"	Andrea Bocelli	3:07
8.	"Joy To The World"	Andrea Bocelli, Matteo Bocelli, Virginia Bocelli	3:03
9.	"The Greatest Gift"	Andrea Bocelli, Matteo Bocelli, Virginia Bocelli	4:02
10.	"When Christmas Comes To Town"	Virginia Bocelli	3:39
11.	"Happy Xmas (War Is Over)"	Matteo Bocelli, Virginia Bocelli	3:32
12.	"Il Giorno Più Speciale"	Andrea Bocelli, Matteo Bocelli, Virginia Bocelli	3:16
13.	"I'll Be Home For Christmas"	Matteo Bocelli	3:12
14.	"Let It Snow"	Andrea Bocelli, Virginia Bocelli	1:54
15.	"Silver Bells"	Andrea Bocelli, Matteo Bocelli, Virginia Bocelli	2:37
16.	"Winter Wonderland"	Andrea Bocelli, Virginia Bocelli	2:33
17.	"E'Natale!"	Andrea Bocelli	2:20
18.	"Hallelujah"	Andrea Bocelli, Virginia Bocelli	4:29
19.	"Do You Hear What I Hear? (Pentatonix)"	Andrea Bocelli, Matteo Bocelli, Virginia Bocelli, Pentatonix	3:01
20.	"Feliz Navidad (The Simpsons)"	Andrea Bocelli, Matteo Bocelli, Virginia Bocelli, The Simpsons	2:03
21.	"The Greatest Gift (Family Mix)"	Andrea Bocelli, Matteo Bocelli, Virginia Bocelli	3:02
22.	"Cantique de Noël (Duet Version)"	Andrea Bocelli, Matteo Bocelli	4:35

== Reception ==
The album hit number 22 in the Billboard 200 and stayed on the charts for 5 weeks between December 2022 and January 2023.

The album was the best-selling christmas album of 2022.

In Ireland the album was at number one for the week of December 23, 2022.
