= The Ultimate Collection (Luciano Pavarotti album) =

Greatest hits album by Luciano Pavarotti
- Released: September 10, 2007
- Genre: Opera
- Label: UCJ

The Ultimate Collection is a greatest hits compilation album released by Italian opera tenor Luciano Pavarotti. It was released in the UK on September 10, 2007, four days after Pavarotti's death.

The album includes 20 of his very well known hits (including the smash hit "Nessun dorma"), plus an extra track called "Live Like Horses" (a collaboration with Elton John).

== Track listing ==
1. "Nessun dorma"
2. "Brindisi"
3. "'O sole mio"
4. "La Donna è Mobile"
5. "Volare"
6. "Panis Angelicus"
7. "Caruso"
8. "Non Ti Scordar di Me"
9. "Torna a Surriento"
10. "Funiculì Funiculà"
11. "Una Furtiva Lagrima"
12. "Ave Maria"
13. "Granada"
14. "Core N'Grato"
15. "Che Gelida Manina"
16. "Mamma"
17. "Santa Lucia"
18. "Mattinata"
19. "E Lucevan le Stelle"
20. "Celeste Aida"

Bonus Tracks

21. "Live Like Horses" (with Elton John)
