= Time to Say Hello =

2008 autobiography by Katherine Jenkins

- Author: Katherine Jenkins
- Language: English
- Genre: Autobiography
- Publisher: Orion Books
- Publication date: 28 January 2008
- Publication place: United Kingdom
- Media type: Print (Hardcover)
- Pages: 288
- ISBN: 978-0-7528-8838-5

Time to Say Hello: The Autobiography (ISBN 978-0752888385) is a 2008 autobiography by Katherine Jenkins. It was published in hardback in January 2008 by Orion Books.

It was released on paperback on 5 February 2009.

The book's title comes from the song, "Time to Say Goodbye".
