= Second Nature (Katherine Jenkins album) =

2004 studio album by Katherine Jenkins

Studio album by Katherine Jenkins
- Released: 18 October 2004; 2005 (La Diva)
- Recorded: 2004
- Genre: Classical crossover
- Label: Universal Classics and Jazz

Katherine Jenkins chronology
Premiere (2004)	Second Nature (2004)	Living a Dream (2005)

La Diva cover
- North American cover

Second Nature is the second studio album by Welsh mezzo-soprano Katherine Jenkins, released on 18 October 2004, in the UK. It charted at number 16 on the UK Albums Chart and at number 1 on the UK Classical Album Chart.

The album was released as La Diva in 2005 in the US and Canada. It peaked at #16 on the US Classical Albums chart.

== Track listing ==
1. "Time to Say Goodbye"
2. "Caruso"
3. "Va Pensiero"
4. "House of No Regrets"
5. "O Sole Mio"
6. "En Aranjuez con tu Amor"
7. "Seguidilla"
8. "Song to the Moon"
9. "Vide Cor Meum" (with Rhys Meirion)
10. "Calon Lân"
11. "Hymn to the Fallen"
12. "Barcarolle"
13. "Laudate Dominum"
14. "O Holy Night"
15. "You'll Never Walk Alone"

=== Canadian track listing ===
1. "Time To Say Goodbye"
2. "Caruso"
3. "Va Pensiero"
4. "House of No Regrets"
5. "O Sole Mio"
6. "En Aranjuez Con Tu Amor"
7. "Séguédilla"
8. "Song to the Moon"
9. "Calon Lan"
10. "Hymn to the Fallen"
11. "Laudate Dominum"
12. "You'll Never Walk Alone"

== Certifications ==
Region	Certification	Certified units/sales
United Kingdom (BPI)	Platinum	300,000^{^}
^{^} Shipments figures based on certification alone.
