= UK Classical Charts =

Three record charts based on classical music

The UK Classical Charts are three record charts based on classical music in the United Kingdom: the Classical Artist Albums Chart, the Classical Compilation Albums Chart and the Specialist Classical Albums Chart. The charts are commercial monitoring and marketing devices used by the UK music industry to measure its effectiveness in promoting and selling albums, nominally in the field of classical music. All three charts are compiled by the Official Charts Company (OCC). The measurements are made by collating the returns of sales from a number of well-known music stores (high street and online stores) on a regular basis, and this enables a ranking to be established. Most classical artist album sales in the UK are from crossover artists. For an album to be classified as classical in the charts, it has to have 60% of the playing time dedicated to "classical or traditional music". Only albums that entirely classical or traditional music qualify for inclusion in the Specialist Classical Albums Chart.

== Classical Artist Albums Chart ==
- List of Classical Artist Albums Chart number ones of the 2000s
- List of Classical Artist Albums Chart number ones of the 2010s
- List of Classical Artist Albums Chart number ones of the 2020s

== Specialist Classical Albums Chart ==
The Specialist Classical Albums Chart was launched in February 2009, having been created in consultation with the record labels' industry body, the British Phonographic Industry (BPI).

- List of Specialist Classical Albums Chart number ones of the 2000s
- List of Specialist Classical Albums Chart number ones of the 2010s
- List of Specialist Classical Albums Chart number ones of the 2020s
