= Rejoice (Katherine Jenkins album) =

Studio album by Katherine Jenkins
- Released: 19 November 2007
- Recorded: 2006–07
- Genre: Classical crossover arias
- Label: Universal Classics and Jazz

Katherine Jenkins chronology
Serenade (2006)	Rejoice (2007)	Sacred Arias (2008)

Professional ratings
Review scores
Source	Rating
Allmusic	3/5 stars

Rejoice is the fifth album by Welsh mezzo-soprano Katherine Jenkins, released on 19 November 2007, in the UK. It charted at number 3 on the UK Albums Chart.

== Track listing ==
1. "Rejoice" written by Steve Mac/Wayne Hector
2. "I (Who Have Nothing)" Carlo Donida, Mogol, Jerry Leiber, Mike Stoller
3. "Sancta Maria"
4. "Secret Love"
5. "Le cose che sei per me"
6. "How Do You Leave the One You Love" written by Steve Mac/Jörgen Elofsson/John Reid
7. "Requiem for a Soldier"
8. "Somewhere"
9. "Shout in Silence" written by Gary Barlow/Andy Hill
10. "Be Still My Soul"
11. "Kiss from a Rose"
12. "I Will Pray for You" written by Steve Mac/Blair Daly/Chris Farren
13. "Viva Tonight" written by Gary Barlow/Andy Hill

== Charts ==
=== Weekly charts ===
Chart (2007)	Peak position
Australian Albums (ARIA)	25
Irish Albums (IRMA)	18
New Zealand Albums (RMNZ)	23
Scottish Albums (OCC)	6
UK Albums (OCC)	3

=== Year-end charts ===
Chart (2007)	Position
UK Albums (OCC)	50

== Certifications ==
Region	Certification	Certified units/sales
United Kingdom (BPI)	Platinum	300,000^{*}
^{*} Sales figures based on certification alone.
