= Mohamed Kanneh =

Liberian footballer

Personal information
- Full name: Mohamed Siaka Kanneh
- Date of birth: 15 March 1991 (age 35)
- Place of birth: Liberia
- Height: 1.84 m (6 ft 0 in)
- Position: Midfielder

Senior career*
Years	Team	Apps	(Gls)
2014–2015	Al-Sailiya	5	(0)
2015–2017	Al-Markhiya	-	(-)
2017–2018	Al-Arabi	4	(0)
2018–2019	Al-Wakrah	-	(-)
2019–2020	Muaither	-	(-)
- * Club domestic league appearances and goals

Mohamed Kanneh (born 15 March 1991) is a Liberian footballer. He currently plays as a midfielder.

== Career ==
He formerly played for Al-Sailiya, Al-Markhiya, Al-Arabi, Al-Wakrah, and Muaither.
