= Daydream (Katherine Jenkins album) =

Studio album by Katherine Jenkins
- Released: 10 October 2011
- Genre: Classical Crossover
- Label: Warner Bros.

Katherine Jenkins chronology
One Fine Day (2011)	Daydream (2011)	This is Christmas (2012)

Daydream is the eighth studio album by Welsh classical crossover artist Katherine Jenkins and was released on 10 October 2011. The album was her second with Warner Bros.

== Track listing ==
=== International edition ===
No.	Title	Writer(s)	Length
1.	"Black Is the Colour (Of My True Love's Hair)"	Traditional	4:20
2.	"Your Silhouette"	Audra Mae	4:11
3.	"Can't Slow Down"	Ashley Monroe, John Shanks	3:30
4.	"J'avais rêvé d'une autre vie (I Dreamed a Dream)"	Claude-Michel Schönberg	3:46
5.	"Carrickfergus"	Traditional	3:12
6.	"L'Alba Verrà (The Dawn Will Come)"	Frédéric Chopin	4:25
7.	"And This Is My Beloved"	Alexander Borodin	3:18
8.	"Love Divine (Hyfrydol)"	Traditional	3:18
9.	"Ave Maria"	John Brunning	4:37
10.	"A Flower Tells A Story"	Simon Franglen	4:12
11.	"Break It to My Heart"	Delta Goodrem, Kristian Lundin, Savan Kotecha	3:31
12.	"Blaenwern"	William Penfro Rowlands	3:54
13.	"Abigail's Song" (From Doctor Who "A Christmas Carol")	Murray Gold	4:39

== Charts ==
Chart (2011)	Peak position
New Zealand Albums (RMNZ)	29
UK Albums (Official Charts)	6

== Certifications ==
Region	Certification	Certified units/sales
United Kingdom (BPI)	Silver	60,000^{*}
^{*} Sales figures based on certification alone.
