= Home Sweet Home (Katherine Jenkins album) =

Studio album by Katherine Jenkins
- Released: 17 November 2014 (UK edition)
- Recorded: 2014 London
- Genre: Classical Crossover
- Label: Decca Records

Katherine Jenkins chronology
This is Christmas (2012)	Home Sweet Home (2014)	Celebration (2016)

Home Sweet Home is the tenth studio album by classical crossover artist Katherine Jenkins and was released on 17 November 2014 in the UK.

== Track listing ==
No.	Title	Writer(s)	Length
1.	"Land of my Fathers"	James James, Ewan James	3:21
2.	"Beethoven's Ode to Joy" (with David Garrett)	Ludwig van Beethoven	3:42
3.	"Sanctus"	Sir Edward Elgar	3:37
4.	"Barcelona" (with Alfie Boe)	Freddie Mercury, Mike Moran	4:26
5.	"Dreaming of the Days"	Ludovico Einaudi, Luke Juby	4:20
6.	"World in Union"	Gustav Holst, Charlie Skarbek	4:11
7.	"Segreti"	Ryan Tedder	4:27
8.	"Remember"	Johann Christian Bach, Patrick Hamilton, Christina Rossetti, Luke Juby	4:18
9.	"We'll Gather Lilacs"	Ivor Novello	3:25
10.	"How Great Thou Art"	Stuart K. Hine	4:56
11.	"Home! Sweet Home!"	Sir Henry Rowley Bishop, John Howard Payne	3:48
12.	"Anthem"	Björn Ulvaeus, Tim Rice, Benny Andersson	3:22
13.	"We Are the Champions"	Freddie Mercury	3:29
14.	"Silent Night"	Franz Xaver Gruber, Joseph Mohr	3:36

=== Deluxe album version ===
No.	Title	Writer(s)	Length
15.	"Amigos Para Siempre" (with Mark Masri)	Andrew Lloyd Webber, Don Black	4:12
16.	"The Moon Represents My Heart"	Sun Yi, Weng Ching-hsi	3:41
17.	"Home"	Warren Ellis, Nick Cave	4:19

== Certifications ==
Region	Certification	Certified units/sales
United Kingdom (BPI)	Silver	60,000^{*}
^{*} Sales figures based on certification alone.

== Personnel ==
- Katherine Jenkins – lead vocals
