= Believe (Andrea Bocelli album) =

Studio album by Andrea Bocelli
- Released: 13 November 2020
- Recorded: 2020
- Genre: Operatic pop
- Length: 58:20
- Label: Sugar Music; Decca
- Producer: Steven Mercurio; Haydn Bendall

Andrea Bocelli chronology
Si (2018)	Believe (2020)	A Family Christmas (2022)

Believe is the seventeenth studio album by Italian tenor Andrea Bocelli. The album was released on 13 November 2020 by Sugar Music and Decca Records.

== Track listing ==
Believe track listing
No.	Title	Writer(s)	Length
1.	"You'll Never Walk Alone" (featuring The Tabernacle Choir at Temple Square)	Richard Rodgers; Oscar Hammerstein II	3:22
2.	"Fratello sole, sorella luna (dolce è sentire)"	Riz Ortolani; Rina Ranieri	4:36
3.	"Hallelujah"	Leonard Cohen	4:34
4.	"Pianissimo" (duet with Cecilia Bartoli)	Mauro Malavasi	4:28
5.	"Amazing Grace" (duet with Alison Krauss)	William Walker; John Newton	3:56
6.	"Preghiera (alla mente confusa)"	Francesco Paolo Tosti; Giuseppe Giusti	4:07
7.	"Gratia plena" (from the movie Fatima)	Paolo Buonvino	2:49
8.	"Cantique de Jean Racine"	Gabriel Fauré; Jean Racine	5:23
9.	"Inno Sussurato"	Ennio Morricone; Pacifico	4:36
10.	"Oh, Madre Benedetta! (Adagio Di Albinoni)"	Remo Giazotto; Tomaso Albinoni; Andrea Bocelli	3:30
11.	"I Believe" (duet with Cecilia Bartoli)	Eric Levisalles	4:14
12.	"Ave Maria"	Andrea Bocelli	4:42
13.	"Angele Dei"	Giacomo Puccini	4:21
14.	"Agnus Dei (Intermezzo from L'arlésienne suite No.2, No.6)"	Georges Bizet	3:43
Total length:			58:20

Deluxe edition bonus tracks and Japanese edition bonus tracks
No.	Title	Writer(s)	Length
15.	"Mui Grandes Noit' E Día (No. 57 from Cantigas de Santa Maria)"	Alfonso Ex El Sabio	4:07
16.	"Mira Il Tuo Popolo" (arr. Mercurio)		3:41
17.	"Amazing Grace" (solo version)	Walker; Newton	3:56
Total length:			70:04

Target bonus tracks
No.	Title	Length
18.	"Laudate Dominion"
19.	"Padre Nostro"

== Charts ==
=== Weekly charts ===
Weekly chart performance for Believe
Chart (2020–2021)	Peak position
Australian Albums (ARIA)	5
Belgian Albums (Ultratop Flanders)	13
Belgian Albums (Ultratop Wallonia)	56
Canadian Albums (Billboard)	60
Czech Albums (ČNS IFPI)	4
Dutch Albums (Album Top 100)	22
German Albums (Offizielle Top 100)	39
Hungarian Albums (MAHASZ)	13
Irish Albums (OCC)	3
Italian Albums (FIMI)	27
New Zealand Albums (RMNZ)	40
Polish Albums (ZPAV)	8
Portuguese Albums (AFP)	12
Scottish Albums (OCC)	2
Slovak Albums (ČNS IFPI)	26
UK Albums (OCC)	3
US Billboard 200	26
US Top Classical Albums (Billboard)	1

=== Year-end charts ===
Year-end chart performance for Believe
Chart (2020)	Position
Irish Albums (IRMA)	37
Polish Albums (ZPAV)	63
UK Albums (OCC)	80

== Certifications ==
Certifications and sales for Believe
Region	Certification	Certified units/sales
Poland (ZPAV)	Platinum	20,000^{‡}
^{‡} Sales+streaming figures based on certification alone.
