= Serenade (Katherine Jenkins album) =

Studio album by Katherine Jenkins
- Released: 6 November 2006
- Recorded: 2006
- Genre: Classical crossover
- Label: Universal Classics and Jazz

Katherine Jenkins chronology
Living a Dream (2005)	Serenade (2006)	Rejoice (2007)

Professional ratings
Review scores
Source	Rating
Allmusic	3.5/5 stars

Serenade is the fourth album by Welsh mezzo-soprano Katherine Jenkins, released on 6 November 2006, in the UK. It charted at number 5 on the UK Albums Chart and at number 1 on the UK Classical Album Chart.

== Track listing ==
1. "(Quello che faró) Sarà per te"
2. "Nella Fantasia"
3. "Chanson Bohème" (from Bizet's Carmen)
4. "Green Green Grass of Home"
5. "O Mio Babbino Caro"
6. "Be My Love"
7. "The Flower Duet" (feat. Kiri Te Kanawa)
8. "Pachelbel's Canon"
9. "Granada"
10. "Lisa Lân"
11. "The Prayer"
12. "Dear Lord and Father of Mankind"
13. "Il Canto"
14. "Ave Maria"

== Charts ==
=== Weekly charts ===
Chart (2006)	Peak position
Australian Albums (ARIA)	92
Irish Albums (IRMA)	92
Scottish Albums (OCC)	8
UK Albums (OCC)	5

=== Year-end charts ===
Chart (2006)	Position
UK Albums (OCC)	54
Chart (2007)	Position
UK Singles (OCC)	155

== Certifications ==
Region	Certification	Certified units/sales
United Kingdom (BPI)	Platinum	300,000^{^}
^{^} Shipments figures based on certification alone.
