= Sacred Arias (Katherine Jenkins album) =

Studio album by Katherine Jenkins
- Released: 20 October 2008
- Recorded: January–July 27, 2008; Air Studios, London, City Road Studios, Newcastle, Angel Recording Studios, London
- Genre: Classical Crossover Arias
- Length: 48:52
- Label: Universal Classics and Jazz
- Producer: Simon Franglen

Katherine Jenkins chronology
Rejoice (2007)	Sacred Arias (2008)	Believe (2009)

Professional ratings
Review scores
Source	Rating
Allmusic	link

Sacred Arias is the sixth album by Welsh mezzo-soprano Katherine Jenkins, released on 20 October 2008 in the UK. It is her final album with the Universal Music label.

A Deluxe Edition containing a second disc was also released. This contains the first chapter of Jenkins' autobiography, Time to Say Hello, read by Jenkins herself.

After the first week of release Sacred Arias was at number 5 on the UK Albums Chart.

== Track listing ==
1. "Abide with Me" (Henry Francis Lyte, arr. Simon Franglen) - 4:36
2. "Pie Jesu" (Andrew Lloyd Webber) - 3:39
3. "The Lord is My Shepherd" (Howard Goodall/Sacred text) - 2:57
4. "Down in the River to Pray" (Traditional, arr. Steven Baker, Simon Franglen) - 3:00
5. "May the Good Lord Bless and Keep You" (Meredith Willson) - 4:36
6. "Hallelujah" (Leonard Cohen) - 4:47
7. "Panis angelicus" (César Franck, arr. Simon Franglen) - 2:40
8. "In Paradisum" (Gabriel Fauré, arr. Simon Franglen) - 3:14
9. "Silent Night" (Franz Gruber, arr. Simon Franglen, Nicholas Dodd, Joseph Mohr) - 4:41
10. "Ave Maria" (Simon Lindley) - 3:51
11. "Misa Criolla: Kyrie" (Ariel Ramírez, arr. Alejandro Mayol, Osvaldo Armando Catena, Jesús Gabriel Segrad) - 3:54
12. "Agnus Dei" (Samuel Barber) - 6:28

== Personnel ==
- Simon Franglen - producer, arrangement, keyboards and programming
- Jon Bailey - engineer and mixer
- Nick Cervonaro - assistant engineer
- Geoff Foster - engineer
- Chris Barrett - assistant engineer
- Tony Cousins - mastered by, at Metropolis Mastering
- Andrew Lloyd Webber - orchestral arrangement
- Howard Goodall - orchestral arrangement
- Nicholas Dodd - orchestral arrangement and conductor
- Daniel Roberts - music transcription
- Jonathan Rathbone - music transcription
- Steve Baker - piano, organ, music transcription and choral arrangement
- The London Session Orchestra
  - Isobel Griffiths - orchestral contractor
- The Crouch End Festival Chorus
  - David Temple - musical director and conductor
  - Geoffrey Kemball-Cook - music librarian
  - Steve James - general manager
  - Tony Wren - arrangements manager
- James Fitzpatrick - choral contractor
- The Rodolfus Choir
  - Ralph Allwood - musical director and conductor
  - James Oldfield - choir manager
- Steffan Hughes - treble
- Gary Kettel - traditional tenor drum

== Charts ==
=== Weekly charts ===
Chart (2008)	Peak position
Irish Albums (IRMA)	47
Scottish Albums (OCC)	8
UK Albums (OCC)	5

=== Year-end charts ===
Chart (2008)	Position
UK Albums (OCC)	54

== Certifications ==
Region	Certification	Certified units/sales
United Kingdom (BPI)	Gold	100,000^{*}
^{*} Sales figures based on certification alone.
