= Première (Katherine Jenkins album) =

Premiere

Studio album by Katherine Jenkins
- Released: 5 April 2004
- Recorded: 2003 – 2004
- Genre: Classical Crossover
- Length: 45:38
- Label: Universal Classics and Jazz
- Producer: Ben Robbins

Katherine Jenkins chronology
Premiere (2004)	Second Nature (2004)

Professional ratings
Review scores
Source	Rating
BBC	(Favorable)
musicOMH	(Favorable)

Premiere is the debut album by Welsh mezzo-soprano Katherine Jenkins, released on 5 April 2004, in the UK. It charted at number 31 on the UK Albums Chart, and at number 1 on the UK Classical Album Chart.

== Track listing ==
1. "Questo è per te" 3:39
2. "Ash Grove" 3:09
3. "Ave Maria" 3:01
4. "Bailero" 2:51
5. "Lord Is My Shepherd" 4:22
6. "Ar Lan Y Mor" 2:30
7. "Sweetest Love" 3:58
8. "Habanera" 2:48
9. "Cymru Fach" 3:55
10. "Caro Mio Ben" 2:14
11. "Lascia Ch'io Pianga" 3:14
12. "Miserere" 3:54
13. "Absence" 3:00
14. "Cwm Rhondda" 2:48

== Certifications ==
Region	Certification	Certified units/sales
United Kingdom (BPI)	Gold	100,000^{*}
^{*} Sales figures based on certification alone.
