= Living a Dream =

Studio album by Katherine Jenkins
- Released: 31 October 2005
- Recorded: 2005
- Genre: Classical crossover
- Label: Universal Classics and Jazz

Katherine Jenkins chronology
Second Nature (2004)	Living a Dream (2005)	Serenade (2006)

Professional ratings
Review scores
Source	Rating
musicOMH	(Positive)

Living a Dream is the third album by Welsh mezzo-soprano Katherine Jenkins, released on 31 October 2005, in the UK. It charted at number 4 on the UK Albums Chart and at number 1 on the UK Classical Album Chart.

== Track listing ==
1. "L'Amore sei tu"
2. "I Vow to Thee My Country"
3. "One Fine Day (Un bel dì)"
4. "Canto della Terra"
5. "Music of the Night"
6. "Nessun dorma"
7. "Cinema Paradiso/Se"
8. "Ebben? Ne andrò lontana"
9. "Amazing Grace"
10. "David of the White Rock"
11. "All Things Bright and Beautiful"
12. "Mon cœur s'ouvre à ta voix"
13. "Over the Rainbow"
14. "Torna a Surriento"
15. "Do Not Stand At My Grave And Weep"
16. "We'll Meet Again"

== Charts ==
Chart performance for Living a Dream
Chart (2005)	Peak position
Australian Albums (ARIA)	13
New Zealand Albums (RMNZ)	13
Scottish Albums (Official Charts)	9
UK Albums (Official Charts)	4

== Certifications ==
Certifications for Living a Dream
Region	Certification	Certified units/sales
New Zealand (RMNZ)	Gold	7,500^{^}
United Kingdom (BPI)	Platinum	300,000^{^}
^{^} Shipments figures based on certification alone.
