= This Is Christmas (Katherine Jenkins album) =

Studio album by Katherine Jenkins
- Released: 30 October 2012 (US edition); 26 November 2012 (UK edition)
- Recorded: 2012 London
- Genres: Christmas, classical crossover
- Label: Warner Bros.
- Producer: Mike Hedges

Katherine Jenkins chronology
Daydream (2011)	This Is Christmas (2012)	Home Sweet Home (2014)

Singles from This Is Christmas
- 1. "O Come O Come Emmanuel" Released: 4 December 2012; 2. "Hark! The Herald Angels Sing" Released: 4 December 2012; 3. "Come What May" Released: 4 December 2012

Professional ratings
Review scores
Source	Rating
theartsdesk.com	3/5 stars
allmusic	3.5/5 stars
Daily Express	4/5 stars

This Is Christmas is the ninth studio album by classical crossover artist Katherine Jenkins and was released on 30 October in the US and Canada, and 26 November in the UK.

== Track listing ==
=== United States edition ===
No.	Title	Writer(s)	Length
1.	"O Come, O Come, Emmanuel"	Traditional	3:37
2.	"In Dulci Jubilo"	Traditional	2:31
3.	"Away in a Manger"	William J. Kirkpatrick	3:36
4.	"The Christmas Song (Chestnuts Roasting on an Open Fire)"	Bob Wells, Mel Tormé	3:27
5.	"Santa Baby"	Joan Jarvis, Phillip Springer, Tony Springer	3:24
6.	"Deck the Halls (Nos Galan)"	Traditional, Thomas Oliphant	2:19
7.	"Sleep Quietly My Jesus"	Ruth Heller	2:51
8.	"I Wish You Christmas"	John Milford Rutter	4:25
9.	"Hark! The Herald Angels Sing"	Felix Mendelssohn, Charles Wesley	3:20
10.	"Come What May" (with Plácido Domingo)	David Baerwald, Kevin Gilbert	4:35

iTunes Deluxe version
No.	Title	Writer(s)	Length
11.	"Wexford Carol (Bonus Track)"	Traditional	5:08
12.	"In the Bleak Midwinter (Bonus Track)"	Gustav Holst	4:48

=== United Kingdom edition ===
No.	Title	Writer(s)	Length
1.	"O Come, O Come Emmanuel"	Traditional	3:37
2.	"Ding Dong Merrily on High"	Jehan Tabourot, George Ratcliffe Woodward	2:31
3.	"Away in a Manger"	William J. Kirkpatrick	3:36
4.	"In Dulci Jubilo"	Traditional	2:31
5.	"The Christmas Song (Chestnuts Roasting on an Open Fire)"	Bob Wells, Melvin H. Torme	3:27
6.	"Santa Baby"	Joan Jarvis, Phillip Springer, Tony Springer	3:24
7.	"Deck the Halls (Nos Galan)"	Traditional, Thomas Oliphant	2:19
8.	"Sleep Quietly My Jesus"	Ruth Heller	2:51
9.	"I Wish You Christmas"	John Milford Rutter	4:25
10.	"Angels from the Realms of Glory"	Traditional	4:16
11.	"Wexford Carol"	Traditional	5:08
12.	"Hark! The Herald Angels Sing"	Felix Mendelssohn, Charles Wesley	3:20
13.	"Come What May" (with Plácido Domingo)	David Baerwald, Kevin Gilbert	4:35
14.	"O Holy Night (Cantique de Noël)" (with Nathan Pacheco)	Adolphe Adam, John Sullivan Dwight, Placide Cappeau

== Charts ==
=== Weekly charts ===
Chart (2012)	Peak position
Irish Albums (IRMA)	13
Scottish Albums (Official Charts)	35
UK Albums (Official Charts)	26
US Billboard 200	110
US Top Classical Albums (Billboard)	3
US Heatseekers Albums (Billboard)	1
US Top Holiday Albums (Billboard)	16

=== Year-end charts ===
Chart (2012)	Position
UK Albums (OCC)	115
Chart (2013)	Position
US Top Classical Albums (Billboard)	14

== Certifications ==
Region	Certification	Certified units/sales
United Kingdom (BPI)	Gold	100,000^{^}
^{^} Shipments figures based on certification alone.

== Personnel ==
- Katherine Jenkins – lead vocals
