= Kadiatu Kanneh-Mason =

British memoirist and arts administrator

Kadiatu Kanneh-Mason HonFLSW
- Born: 1965 or 1966 (age 59–60); Magburaka, Sierra Leone
- Occupations: Memoirist; arts administrator; Africanist
- Notable work: House of Music: Raising the Kanneh-Masons (2020)
- Spouse: Stuart Mason
- Children: 7 (including Isata and Sheku)
- Employer: University of Birmingham

Academic background
- Education: University of Southampton; University of Sussex
- Thesis: African identities: race, nation and culture in ethnography, Pan-Africanism and black literatures (1995)

Kadiatu Kanneh-Mason HonFLSW (born 1965 or 1966) is a British memoirist and arts administrator. Originally an English lecturer at the University of Birmingham, she stepped down from her university job to raise her seven children, encouraging the development of their musical talents. She has written two memoirs: House of Music: Raising the Kanneh-Masons (2020) and To Be Young, Gifted and Black (2025), and she is a trustee for several arts charities.

== Biography ==
Kadiatu Kanneh, one of four children, was born in Magburaka to a Welsh mother and a Mende father. She was later raised in Bo, Sierra Leone and Wales, UK. Her parents played instruments while growing up, and she recalled in an interview with The Big Issue that she "grew up thinking music was part of everybody's life". She was educated at Southampton University, where she studied art and met her future husband. She then obtained her PhD at the University of Sussex. Her doctoral dissertation was African identities: race, nation and culture in ethnography, Pan-Africanism and black literatures (1995).

Kanneh-Mason originally worked as an English lecturer at the University of Birmingham. In 1998, she published African Identities: Race, Nation and Culture in Ethnography, Pan-Africanism and Black Literatures, a book on the theme of Black identity in African culture. Eventually, she left her job in order to be able to care for the children while her husband was away. After discovering her children's musical talent, she and her husband helped encourage them to develop it further, with some of them studying hours every day and having successful music careers.

She is a trustee for music education charity Music Masters, as well as ESTA, Andrew Lloyd-Webber's Music in Secondary Schools Trust, National Children's Orchestra of Great Britain, the Nottingham Education Trust, and Real Talk TV Notts. She has also served on the Royal Philharmonic Society advisory council.

Kanneh-Mason's first memoir, House of Music: Raising the Kanneh-Masons, was released by Oneworld Publications on 3 September 2020. She won the 2021 Royal Philharmonic Society Storytelling Award and 2022 Indie Book Award for Non-Fiction for her memoir. In 2023, she won the ISM Distinguished Musician Award. She later wrote another memoir, To Be Young, Gifted and Black, released from Oneworld on 8 May 2025 and named after the Nina Simone song of the same name. It was longlisted for the 2026 Women's Prize for Non-Fiction.

In 2025, she was appointed an Honorary Fellow of the Learned Society of Wales.

== Personal life ==
Kanneh-Mason's husband is Stuart Mason, an Antiguan British executive at Belmond Limited; he joined his wife at the Music Masters board of trustees in 2021 and became chair in 2024. They have seven children, all of whom are classical musicians: Isata, Braimah, Sheku, Konya, Jeneba, Aminata, and Mariatu. Colin Grant of The Guardian said: "Families in Britain comprise on average two children and no prodigies; few, if any, bear resemblance to the Kanneh-Masons." In addition, she miscarried four times.

Kanneh-Mason lives in Nottingham, where she and her husband raised their children.

== Works ==
- African Identities: Race, Nation and Culture in Ethnography, Pan-Africanism and Black Literatures (1998)
- House of Music: Raising the Kanneh-Masons (2020)
- To Be Young, Gifted and Black (2025)
