= Viva la Diva (Darcey Bussell and Katherine Jenkins) =

Video by Katherine Jenkins & Darcey Bussell
- Released: 10 November 2008
- Genre: Classical
- Label: Warner

Katherine Jenkins chronology
Katherine in the Park (2007)	Viva la Diva (2008)

Viva la Diva is an operatic ballet show by Welsh mezzo-soprano Katherine Jenkins and prima ballerina Darcey Bussell, CBE. In the show Jenkins and Bussell pay homage to past 'divas' and idols, including Doris Day, Edith Piaf (who died in 1963), Marilyn Monroe (who died in 1962), Maria Callas (who died in 1977), Fred Astaire (who died in 1987), Audrey Hepburn (who died in 1993) and Moira Shearer (who died in 2006). Choreographer Kim Gavin directs.

The object of the show was to primarily swap talents. Bussell and Jenkins sang and danced respectively. In an interview, they reported it as being 'so, so much fun', but completely new territory for both of them. The show's 17 date tour around the UK was a sellout.

The show was not received favourably by The Daily Telegraph's reviewer.

The DVD of the concerts was released on 10 November 2008, and was filmed at the O2 Arena London. The DVD also includes bonus interviews with Jenkins and Bussell. The idea of the show came from Steven Howard, who also produced it.
