= The Ultimate Collection (Katherine Jenkins album) =

2009 compilation album by Katherine Jenkins

Compilation album by Katherine Jenkins
- Released: 2 November 2009
- Genre: Classical Crossover Arias
- Label: Decca

Katherine Jenkins chronology
Believe (2009)	The Ultimate Collection (2009)	Sweetest Love (2011)

The Ultimate Collection is a compilation album by Welsh mezzo-soprano Katherine Jenkins, released in 2009.

== Track listing ==
No.	Title	Writer(s)	Length
1.	"Time to Say Goodbye"	Francesco Sartori	3:46
2.	"Hallelujah"	Leonard Cohen	4:47
3.	"L'Amore Sei Tu" ("I Will Always Love You")	Dolly Parton	4:21
4.	"I Vow to Thee, My Country"	Gustav Holst	3:08
5.	"Quello che farò (sarà per te)" ("(Everything I Do) I Do It for You")	Bryan Adams	4:16
6.	"Nella Fantasia" ("In My Fantasy")	Ennio Morricone	5:09
7.	"Hymn to the Fallen"	John Williams	4:31
8.	"The Flower Duet" (from the opera Lakmé)	Léo Delibes	3:50
9.	"Pie Jesu" ("Kind Jesus")	Andrew Lloyd Webber	3:39
10.	"Calon Lân" ("A Pure Heart")	Daniel James	2:27
11.	"Caruso"	Lucio Dalla	3:52
12.	"Vide Cor Meum" (with Rhys Meirion)	Patrick Cassidy	4:01
13.	"O mio babbino caro" ("Oh my dear papa", from the opera Gianni Schicchi)	Giacomo Puccini	2:37
14.	"Music of the Night" (from the musical The Phantom of the Opera)	Andrew Lloyd Webber	5:46
15.	"I Could Have Danced All Night" (from the musical My Fair Lady)	Frederick Loewe	2:34
16.	"I've Dreamed of You"	Rolf Løvland, Ann Hampton Callaway	3:36
17.	"Don't Cry for Me Argentina" (from the musical Evita)	Andrew Lloyd Webber	6:17

== Charts ==
Chart (2009)	Peak position
German Albums (Offizielle Top 100)	91
UK Albums (OCC)	9
US Top Classical Albums (Billboard)	31
US Top Classical Crossover Albums (Billboard)	10

== Certifications ==
Region	Certification	Certified units/sales
United Kingdom (BPI)	Platinum	300,000^{*}
^{*} Sales figures based on certification alone.
