= Alexis Ffrench =

British musician (born 1970)

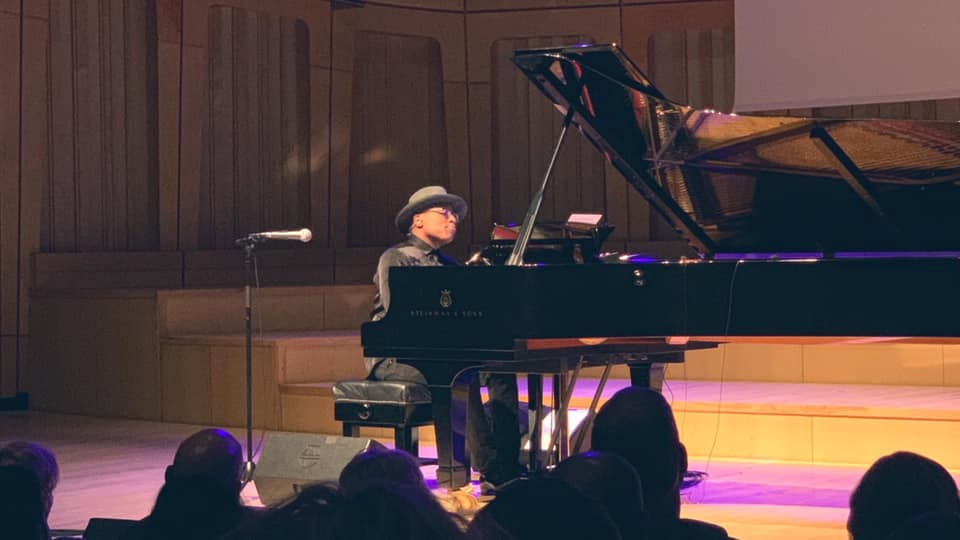

Background information
- Born: June 27, 1970 (age 56); Surrey, England
- Occupations: Pianist, composer, producer
- Label: Sony Music
- Website: www.alexisffrenchmusic.com

Alexis Ffrench (born 1970) is a British classical-soul musician, composer, producer, and pianist. Ffrench's music has more than a billion streams and his albums Evolution (2018), Dreamland (2020) and Classical Soul Vol. 1 (2024) reached No. 1 in the Classical Music Charts.

Ffrench has headlined the Royal Albert Hall, collaborated with FIFA, Tiffany & Co., fashion houses Miyake and Hugo Boss, played Latitude Festival, worked with pop artist Paloma Faith, and composed several film scores. An advocate for music education, Ffrench is a Governing Body Member and Trustee of the Royal Academy of Music, London, and is the first artistic director of the Royal Schools of Music. He was also sworn in as an Honorary Fellow at Homerton College, Cambridge, in June 2025. As a broadcaster, Ffrench is the host of Classical Connections on Apple Music 1.

== Career ==
Ffrench began improvising on the piano at the age of four. He received scholarships to study at the Purcell School for Young Musicians and the Royal Academy of Music. He is known for his unusual style of combining his classical training with a love of roots music and R&B.

Ffrench is signed to Sony Music and Modest! Management. In 2017, he released his single "Bluebird", which has since passed 250 million streams in N. America (certified gold).

Ffrench delivers educational programmes on writing and producing music to young people, and has partnered with the Prince's Trust, MJ Cole, Marvin Humes and other special guests.

In 2019, Ffrench joined Scala Radio as a presenter. In March 2021, he became Scala Radio's composer in residence.

In 2022, Ffrench released the album Truth, also releasing the single "One Look", featuring Leona Lewis. This was followed by the UK Classical number 1 album Classical Soul Vol. 1 in 2024

Alexis Ffrench performed a piano rendition of a carol as part of a tribute to Queen Elizabeth II at the Royal Carols: Together At Christmas service on Christmas Eve 2022. Images of the Queen were projected onto the piano during Ffrench's performance.

Ffrench performed at the Coronation Concert on the 7th of May 2023 celebrating the Coronation of King Charles III.

== Influences ==
Ffrench points to the hip-hop community's success in getting across its complex musical messages to the mainstream. He cites the challenging music of Kendrick Lamar and Anderson .Paak as examples of superstars doing it their way. "Kendrick Lamar's song 'Humble' is like Béla Bartók's Out Of Doors suite, in the pugilistic bass notes in the extremities of the piano at the opening of both works. I think to attract a contemporary audience, classical can learn from how hip-hop has marketed its music and ideas." The mix of Kendrick Lamar and Bartok, Shostakovich and Ariana Grande is present throughout Ffrench's weekly Sunday show on Scala Radio, a broad church where Ffrench highlights the song craft in pop and revels in classical majesty. He has been praised by The Times with the words: "If a single person epitomizes the new push towards making classical music more diverse, eclectic and unstuffy, it's Alexis Ffrench. As a pianist and composer, he creates tonal music that beguiles newcomers with its gentleness and beauty, yet also has enough half-concealed nods to Chopin, Debussy, Satie and other historical figures to keep connoisseurs interested."

== Discography ==
=== Albums ===
Year	Title
2006	Piano Diaries
2009	The Secret Piano
2009	Piano Arias
2009	The Singing Planet
2009	Meditations
2012	Piano Karma
2013	Stolen Lullabies
2015	Escape
2016	The Piano Whisperer
2018	Evolution
2020	Dreamland
2022	Truth
2023	Christmas Piano with Alexis
2024	Classical Soul Vol.1

=== Film scores ===
Year	Title	Director
2018	The House Where The Mermaid Sleeps	Yukihiko Tsutsumi
