= Isata Kanneh-Mason =

British pianist (born 1996)

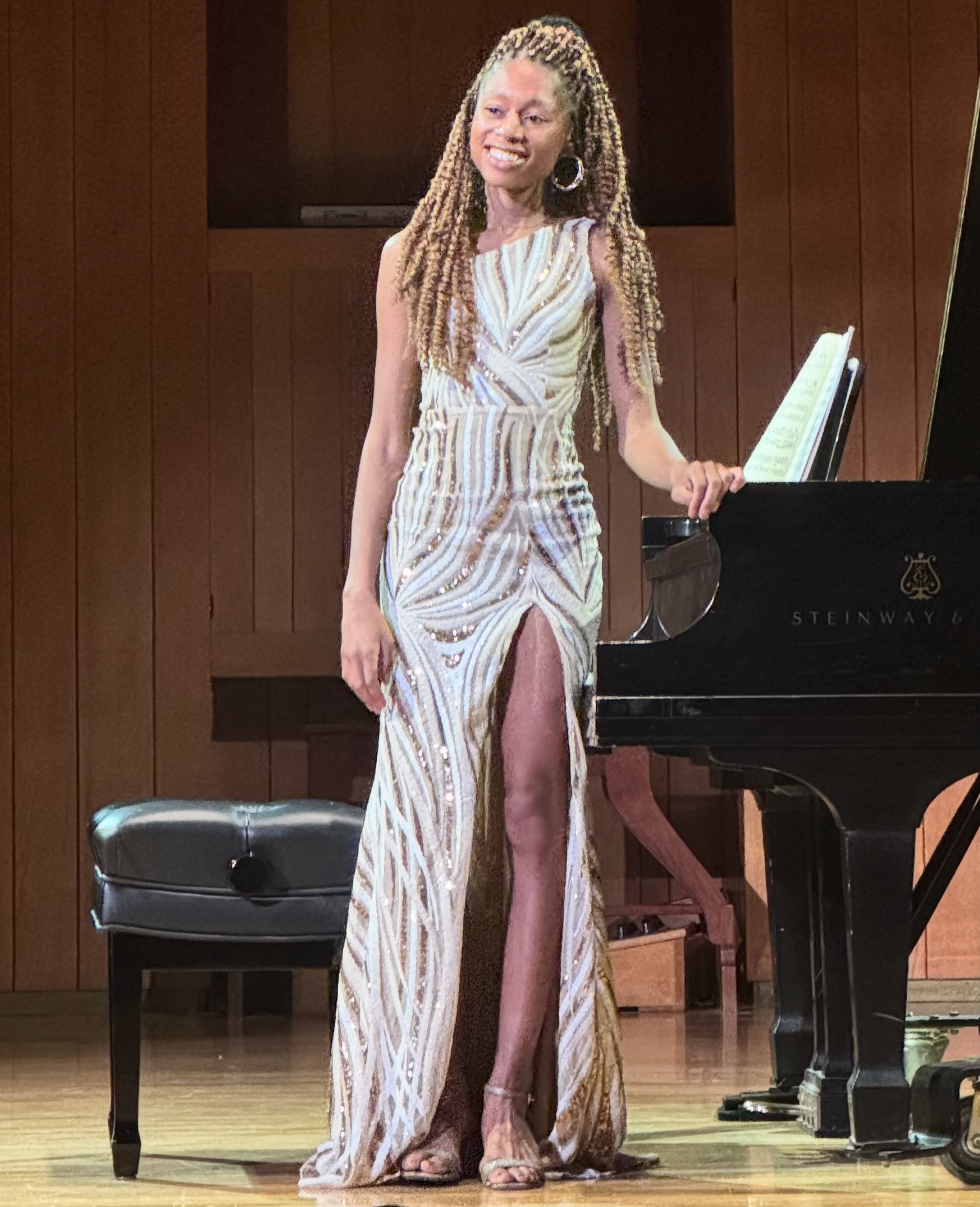
- Kanneh-Mason performing at the University of Vermont Lane Series on 12 October 2024

Background information
- Born: 27 May 1996 (age 30); Nottingham, England
- Genre: Classical
- Instrument: Piano
- Label: Decca Classics
- Website: Isata Kanneh-Mason

Isata Kanneh-Mason /ˈaɪsətəˌkɑnɛˈmeɪsən/ (born 27 May 1996) is a British pianist. She is a frequent collaborator with her brother, cellist Sheku Kanneh-Mason. She has been described as "one of today's most in-demand classical musicians".

== Early life and education ==
Kanneh-Mason grew up in Nottingham, England. She is the first child of Stuart Mason, from London, a luxury hotel business manager of Antiguan descent, and Dr. Kadiatu Kanneh, from Sierra Leone, a former lecturer at the University of Birmingham and author of the 2020 book House of Music: Raising the Kanneh-Masons.

Kanneh-Mason attended the Purcell School, before earning a place to study at the Royal Academy of Music on the Sir Elton John Scholarship. She later performed with Elton John himself in Los Angeles in 2013. While at the RAM, she studied under Joanna MacGregor and Carole Presland.

== Career ==
Kanneh-Mason was named an ECHO Rising Star for the 2021–22 season and received the Leonard Bernstein Award. Her early career recognitions also include an Opus Klassik award for best young artist and selection as one of the Konzerthaus Dortmund’s Junge Wilde artists. During the 2022–23 season, she served as artist-in-residence with the Royal Philharmonic Orchestra.

Kanneh-Mason made her solo debut at the BBC Proms in 2023, playing Sergei Prokofiev's Piano Concerto #3 with the BBC National Orchestra of Wales.

== Discography ==
Kanneh-Mason records for Decca.

- Romance: The Piano Music of Clara Schumann (2019), Classical Artist Albums Chart number one, 18 July 2019
- Summertime (2021)
- Muse (with Sheku Kanneh-Mason) (2021), Classical Artist Albums Chart number one, 12 November 2021
- Childhood Tales (2023)
- Mendelssohn (2024)
- Prokofiev (2026)
