= Froncysyllte Male Voice Choir =

The Froncysyllte Male Voice Choir (Welsh: Côr Meibion Froncysyllte), also known as the Fron Choir (Welsh: Côr Fron), is an amateur male voice choir based in the village of Froncysyllte (pronounced roughly vron-cuss-ulth/ tay), Wrexham County Borough, Wales, near Llangollen in Denbighshire. The village is famous as the site of Thomas Telford's Pontcysyllte Aqueduct.

The village's choir became notable when the Universal Music Group album Voices of the Valley was released in November 2006, reaching number 9 on the UK album chart. It became the fastest-selling classical record of all time, achieving gold status in three days and, by 2009, had sold over half a million copies. A second album, Voices of the Valley - Encore, was released in November 2007.

== History ==
=== Origins ===
In 1946 the neighbouring town of Llangollen invited the village's participation in a traditional Welsh eisteddfod. Invitations went out for 1947 and the Llangollen International Musical Eisteddfod was born. Mr Gomer Powell called a public meeting which resulted in the formation of the Froncysyllte Male Voice Choir, with J. R. Jones ("Joe Jordan") as the first chairman. A local piano teacher, Mr Lloyd Edwards, was appointed as conductor and became the driving force behind the choir. Menna Hughes, daughter of Robert Hughes, the foundation treasurer, and one of Lloyd's pupils, was the inaugural accompanist. To compete in the Male Voice segment of the Llangollen International Musical Eisteddfod, 60 voices were needed, so Wilfred Jones, leader of the Froncysyllte Youth Club, persuaded the young men of the village to join what was, in 1947, the youngest membership of any Welsh male voice choir. The choristers stayed together after the Eisteddfod, with county councillor Watkin Williams as chairman. Lloyd Edwards went on to win major choral competitions and a reputation for excellence at home and abroad until his death in 1970.

=== Association with Pavarotti ===
The choir has remained closely associated with the Eisteddfod and is a regular competitor in the Male Voice Choir competition. In 1955 the choir hosted the Società Corale Gioachino Rossini from Modena, which won first prize at the Llangollen Eisteddfod under the baton of Fernando Pavarotti. This win inspired the conductor's son, Luciano Pavarotti, who sang in the choir, to take up a singing career. The Modena Choir was again hosted by the Froncysyllte Male Voice Choir during its visit, with Luciano Pavarotti, in 1995.

After the loss of Lloyd Edwards in 1970, music teacher John Daniel conducted the choir for the next 21 years. He is now the conductor of Cantorion Colin Jones in the village of Betws y Coed in Snowdonia. Daniel led the choir to success in both the National Eisteddfod of Wales and the Llangollen International Musical Eisteddfod, winning a first-prize double in 1977. The choir has had several overseas tours, notably representing the United Kingdom at the Expo World Fair in Vancouver, British Columbia, Canada in 1986.

Val Jones succeeded John Daniel in 1991. From 2002 until 2009, Ann Atkinson led the choir during one of its most exciting phases, a major recording contract with Universal Music, four Voices of the Valley CDs and a DVD: Voices of the Valley—Live.

Since 2009 the choir has been conducted by Leigh Mason.

== Discography ==
- Voices of the Valley (2006) (AUS #44)
- Voices of the Valley Encore (2007)
- Voices of the Valley: Home (2008)
- Voices of the Valley: Memory Lane (2009)
- Voices of the Valley: The Ultimate Collection (2011)
- The Best of the Fron Choir (2011)
- Voices of the Valley - Echoes (2021)
