= Katherine Jenkins =

Welsh singer (born 1980)

Katherine Jenkins OBE
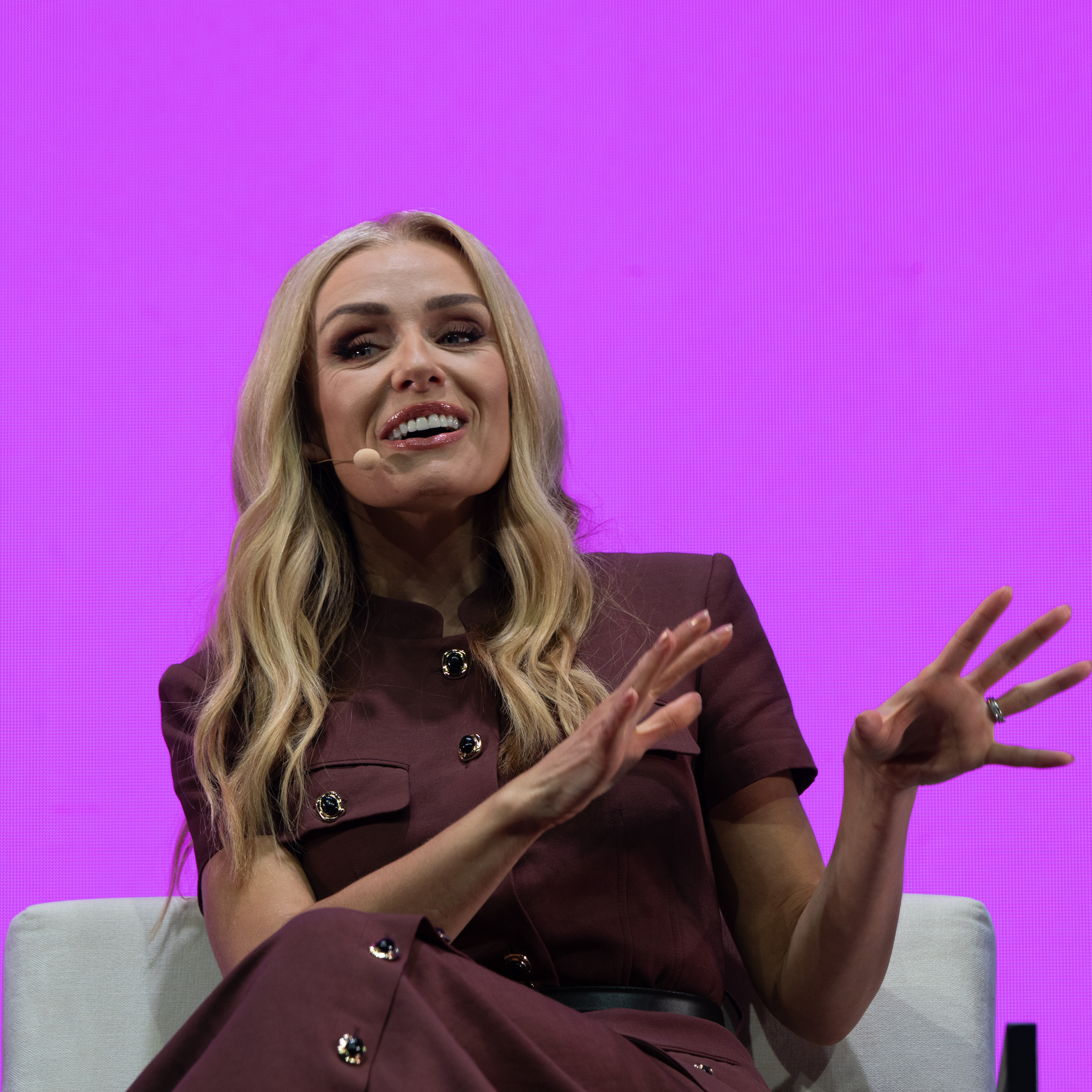
- Jenkins at SXSW London in June 2026

Background information
- Born: 29 June 1980 (age 46); Neath, Wales
- Genres: Crossover music; pop; operatic pop
- Occupation: Singer (mezzo-soprano)
- Instrument: Vocals
- Works: Discography
- Years active: 2003–present
- Labels: Universal; Warner; Decca
- Spouse: Andrew Levitas (m. 2014)
- Partner: Gethin Jones (2007–2011)
- Website: katherinejenkins.co.uk
- Children: 2

Katherine Jenkins OBE (born 29 June 1980) is a Welsh singer. She is a mezzo-soprano who performs operatic arias, popular songs, musical theatre and hymns. After winning singing competitions in her youth, Jenkins studied at the Royal Academy of Music, modelled, and taught voice lessons. She came to wide public attention in 2003 when she sang at Westminster Cathedral in honour of Pope John Paul II's silver jubilee. Since 2004, she has released numerous albums that have performed well on British and foreign charts. In both 2005 and 2006, her albums received Classic Brit Awards as Album of the Year. She has been seen widely in concert and has performed for British Armed Forces in Iraq and Afghanistan. She has sung at sporting events and in support of many charities.

== Early life ==
Katherine Jenkins was born in Neath on 29 June 1980, to factory worker Selwyn John Jenkins and Susan, a NHS radiographer. She has a sister named Laura. She attended the Church in Wales' Alderman Davies primary school in Neath, Dwr-y-Felin Comprehensive School and Gorseinon College. She received A grades in her GCSEs and A Levels and participated in productions such as Calamity Jane and Guys and Dolls.

Jenkins studied vocal performance with John Hugh Thomas and passed her Year 8 examinations with distinction in both singing and piano. Her father, Selwyn, who was twenty-three years older than his wife and took early retirement to look after his children when their mother returned to work, died of lung cancer at age 70 when Jenkins was 15. She has dedicated each award she has received to him.

== Music career ==
=== Early career ===
Between 1991 and 1996, Jenkins was a member of the Royal School of Church Music Cathedral Singers and passed the St Cecilia Award, the highest RSCM award for female choristers. She was also a member of the National Youth Choir of Wales for three years, won the BBC Radio 2 Welsh Choirgirl of the Year contest (twice), and the BET Welsh Choirgirl of the Year competition. She was also awarded the Pelenna Valley Male Voice Choir Scholarship for the most promising young singer. At the age of 17 she won a scholarship to study at the Royal Academy of Music, graduating with honours and receiving a music teacher's diploma.

After working as a freelance voice coach, a tour guide on the London Eye, and as a model, she entered a modelling competition and became the Face of Wales 2000. She then decided to follow a musical career. Universal Classics and Jazz heard her demo, and she was invited to an interview where she sang Rossini's "Una voce poco fa". Universal offered Jenkins a six-album deal, the most lucrative in the United Kingdom's classical recording history, reportedly worth £1 million.

=== Record success ===
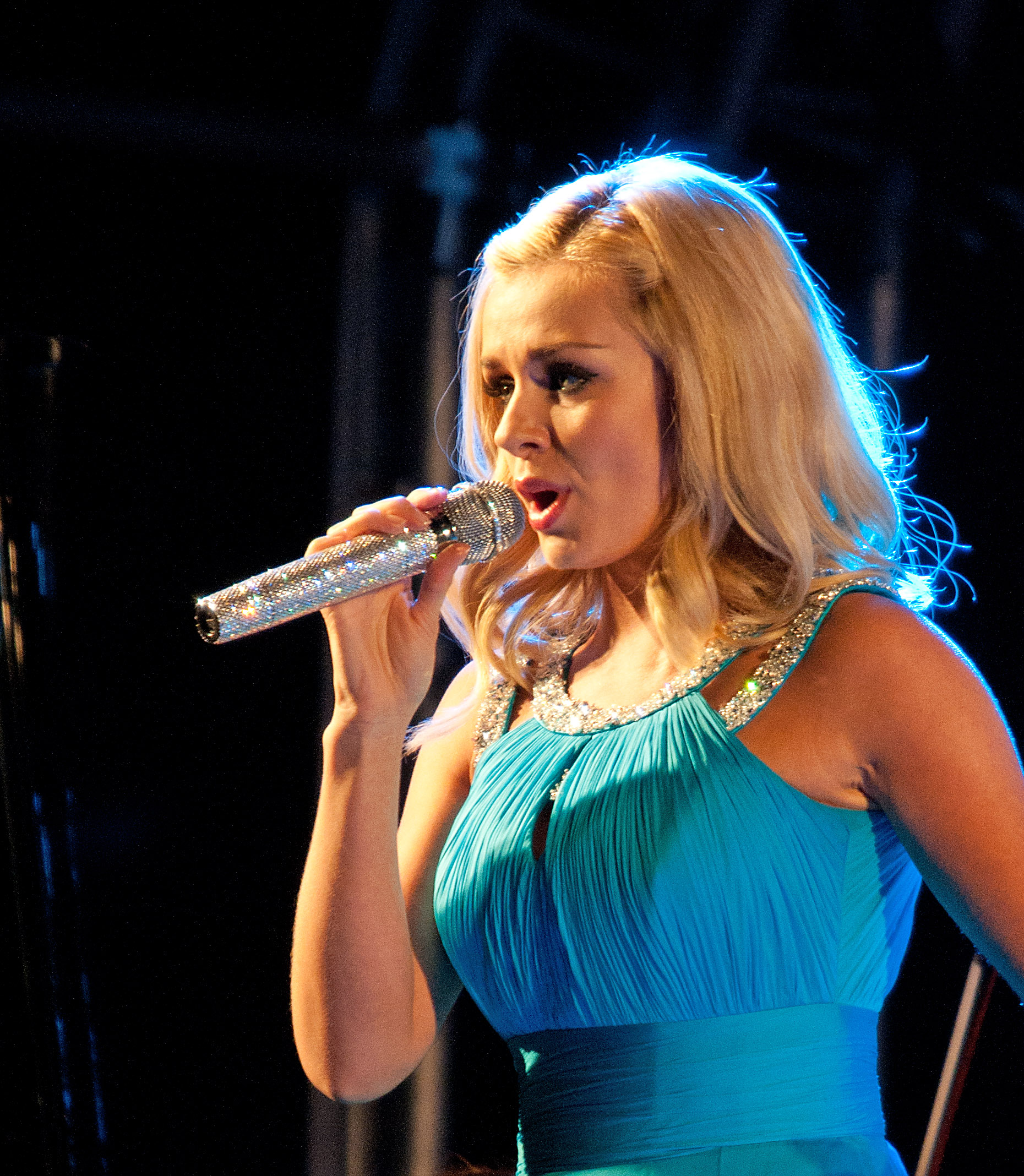
Jenkins performing in 2011

Six out of seven of Jenkins's studio albums reached number one in the UK classical charts between 2004 and 2008, selling a total of more than 4 million copies. After her first album, Premiere, made her the fastest-selling mezzo-soprano to date she became the first British classical crossover artist to have two number one albums in the same year. She is the first female artist to win two consecutive Classical BRIT Awards: her second album, Second Nature, reached number 16 in the UK Albums Chart, and was Album of the Year in the 2005 BRIT Awards.

Jenkins's Italian-language version of Dolly Parton's "I Will Always Love You" ("L'Amore Sei Tu"), first performed live at Nostell Priory, West Yorkshire on 28 August 2005, was the first cut on her third album Living a Dream. After that album was released, uniquely, she held the top three positions in the classical crossover music chart. The album held the number one position for nearly a year and reached number four in the pop album charts. Jenkins repeated the success of Second Nature with her Living a Dream album when she won the classical BRIT award for Album of the Year for a second time.

Her fourth album, Serenade, was released on 6 November 2006 and reached number five in the mainstream charts selling more than 50,000 copies in its first week, a record in the genre. The top four albums on HMV's classical charts were hers.

Her fifth album, Rejoice, was released on 19 November 2007 and included songs written specially for her, two by Take That's Gary Barlow. The album entered the pop album charts at number three, beating the Spice Girls and Girls Aloud. Jenkins commented "I never imagined when I was a young girl listening to them on the radio that I would outsell the Spice Girls and Celine Dion. It's almost too much to take in. I can't thank my fans enough for all their support."

On 20 October 2008 Jenkins released Sacred Arias, which is her last album with Universal Music. On 19 October The Daily Telegraph stated that Jenkins had signed the biggest classical recording deal in history, for US$10 million (£5.8 million), with Warner Music.

Jenkins released her next album, Believe, on 26 October 2009, the first with Warner Music. This album featured Andrea Bocelli and other musicians like André Rieu and Chris Botti. She made various TV appearances such as GMTV, Something for the Weekend and Piers Morgan's Life Stories on 24 October 2009 and on The Graham Norton Show on 2 November 2009. She performed the theme from The Godfather, Parla Piu Piano at Children In Need Rock The Albert Hall with cellist Julian Lloyd Webber. Later in December 2009, she performed a cover of Evanescence's "Bring Me to Life" at The Royal Variety Performance and again at A Concert for Heroes at Twickenham Stadium in September 2010. On 23 May 2010, she went to Argentina for the first time and sang Parla Piu Piano in the popular Argentinian show Susana Giménez.

In 2011, Jenkins released Daydream, with the Christmas album This is Christmas following in 2012.

After a move to Decca Records, Jenkins released Home Sweet Home in 2014, and in 2016 she released the album Celebration.

In August 2017 it was announced by Classic FM that Jenkins was the best selling classical artist of the last 25 years in the UK.

In November 2018 her 13th studio album 'Guiding Light' was released, charting at Number 2. In May 2019 it reached Number 1 making Jenkins the first classical artist to have had 13 Number 1 albums.

Following the death of Queen Elizabeth II, Jenkins was asked by the BBC to be the first to record "God Save the King" for the new King Charles III. The new national anthem aired for the first time the day following the death of the late queen, 10 September 2022.

=== Concerts ===
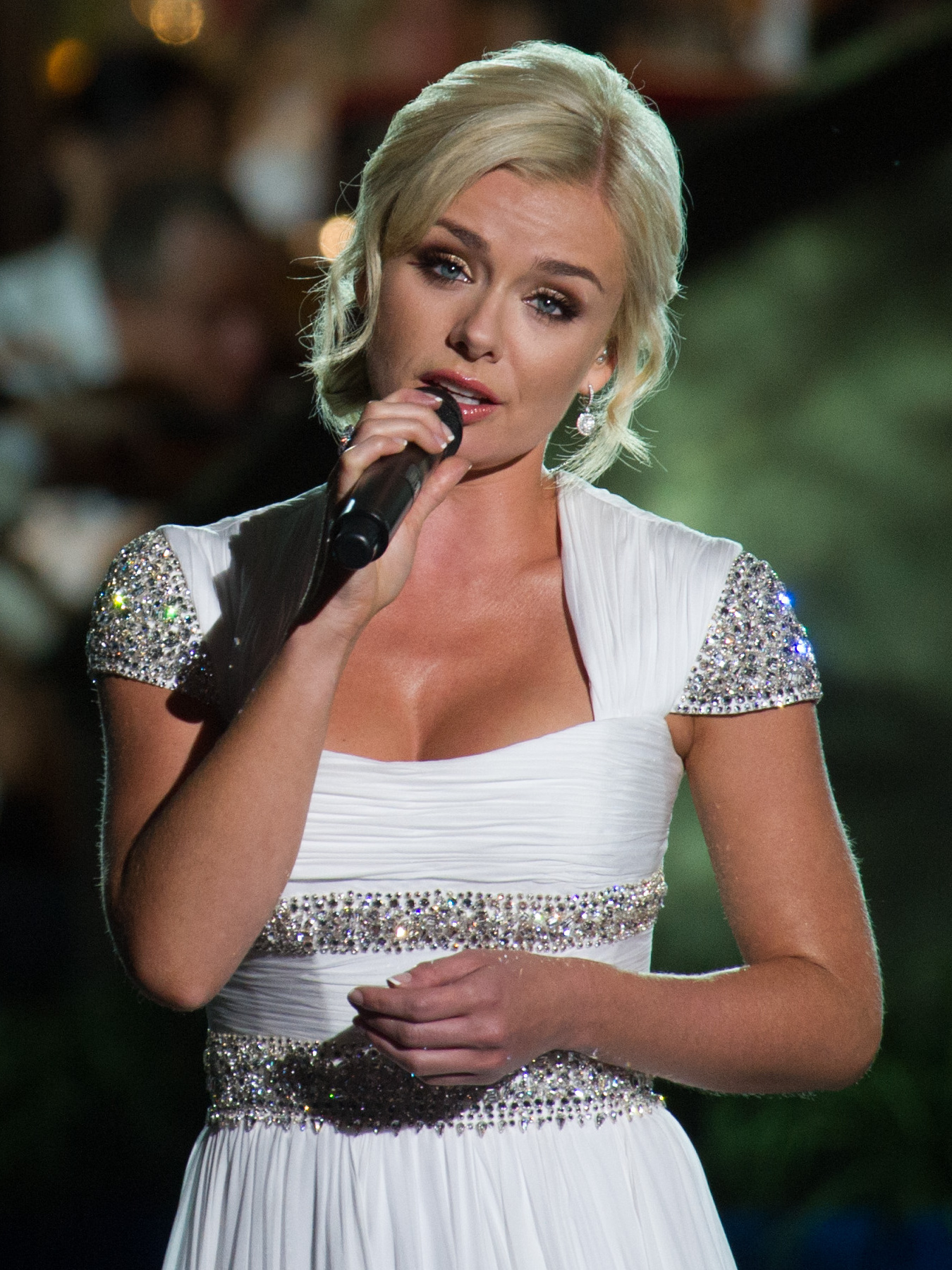
Jenkins live in 2013

Jenkins first came to public attention when she sang at Westminster Cathedral honouring Pope John Paul II's silver jubilee in October 2003 and then supporting Aled Jones on tour. At the Rugby World Cup in 2003 she made her Sydney Opera House debut as a guest of fellow Welshman, Max Boyce and, in August 2004, her first USA appearance, supporting Hayley Westenra at Joe's Pub in New York City.

Jenkins was the first person to perform the Home Nations anthem "The Power of Four" and began to appear regularly to sing the Welsh national anthem "Hen Wlad Fy Nhadau" at Welsh international rugby union matches, singing with Bryn Terfel at the 2005 Wales vs. England Six Nations match at the Millennium Stadium. In 2005, she became the official mascot for the Wales rugby union team.

On 22 January 2005, Jenkins sang in Cardiff at the Tsunami Relief Concert and in April and May of that year supported Irish tenor Ronan Tynan on his first US tour as a solo artist. That May she sang at Trafalgar Square to a 15,000-strong audience celebrating the 60th Anniversary of VE Day. At the Berlin stage of Live 8 in 2005, Jenkins sang the hymn "Amazing Grace", and she later helped to launch The Royal British Legion's poppy appeal at Covent Garden whilst wearing a dress made of 2,500 poppies.

On 27 August 2005, Jenkins performed "Abide With Me" at the Rugby League Challenge Cup Final at the Millennium Stadium in Cardiff which was attended by 74,213 spectators.

In December 2005 and 2006, Jenkins travelled to Iraq to entertain the soldiers for Christmas.

With the Blue Man Group, Jenkins sang "I Feel Love" in front of the Queen at the Royal Variety Performance on 21 November 2005. She performed at the Nobel Peace Prize Concert in Oslo, Norway, on 11 December 2005.

In November 2006 she performed before the Queen at the Royal British Legion Festival of Remembrance at the Royal Albert Hall and joined fellow Welsh singer James Fox in the final verse of "Anthem" from the musical Chess.

In July 2007, Jenkins gave a concert at Margam Park in south Wales, performing alongside Paul Potts and Juan Diego Flórez. Jenkins extended a personal invitation to Potts to sing "Nessun dorma" at the concert.

In September 2007, Jenkins modeled at Naomi Campbell's Fashion Relief event for charity in a Julien Macdonald dress which was then bought by Sir Philip Green for £10,000.

In November 2007 she sang again at the Royal British Legion Festival of Remembrance at the Royal Albert Hall and was named classical performer of the year at the Variety Club of Great Britain Awards.

With Darcey Bussell she has appeared in a stage song-and-dance production, entitled Viva la Diva, paying tribute to stars including Madonna and the late Judy Garland (who died in 1969). The show opened in Manchester in November 2007. Jenkins learned to tap dance, spending eight hours a week learning the choreography and running three miles a day to get fit. She performed the Welsh National Anthem on 17 May 2008 at the 2008 FA Cup Final between Cardiff City and Portsmouth, becoming the first person to do this at an FA Cup Final.

At the beginning of 2009, Jenkins performed in South Korea with Plácido Domingo. This was Jenkins's third concert with Domingo having performed with him in Hong Kong in 2008 and Athens in 2007. They then performed together in May 2009 at The Classical Brit Awards.

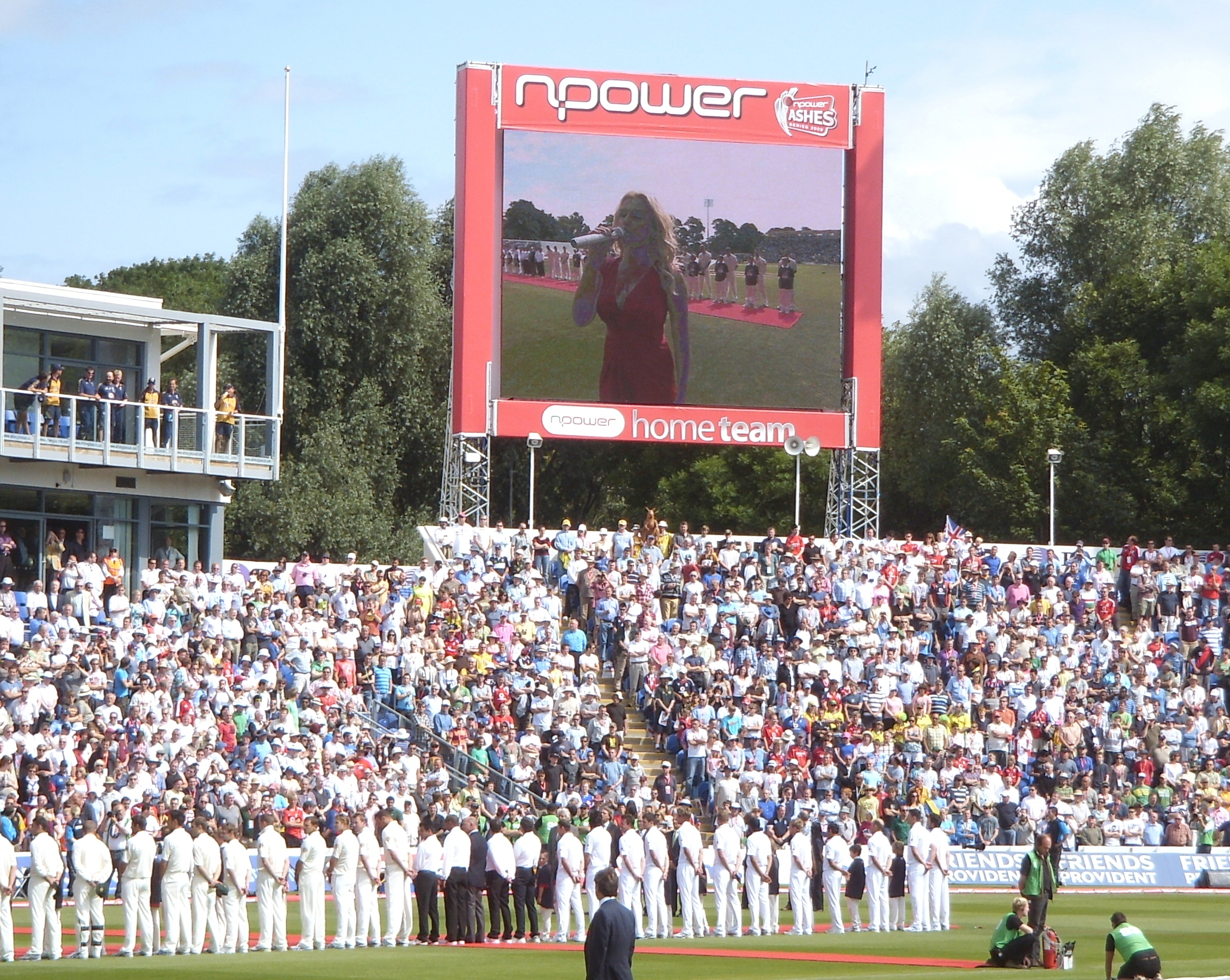
Jenkins at Sophia Gardens before the start of the 2009 Ashes singing Hen Wlad Fy Nhadau, the Welsh national anthem

On 8 July 2009, Jenkins performed at the opening ceremony of the Ashes Test Series at Sophia Gardens cricket ground in Cardiff. On 12 September 2009, she performed in Hyde Park for Proms in the Park.

On 21 September 2009, she performed at the memorial service for Sir Bobby Robson, singing "Pie Jesu" at the request of Lady Robson. On 12 November 2009, Jenkins performed a duet with cellist Julian Lloyd Webber for Children in Need at the Royal Albert Hall. The same month, Jenkins performed "I Believe" (from Believe) with Andrea Bocelli on his PBS Christmas Special. The duet appears in his album, My Christmas. On 24 May 2010, as part of the Argentina Bicentennial she performed the Canadian Anthem at the Argentina VS. Canada World Cup warm-up football match in the River Plate Stadium at Buenos Aires.

On 11 June 2010, Jenkins performed a live comedy routine with Armenian comedy pianist Kev Orkian for a private birthday party at which singer Lionel Richie performed, along with the LSO (London Symphony Orchestra) and comedians Bobby Davro and Jethro. The comedy sketch was an updated version of an old Victor Borge routine which Orkian had written and developed with Jenkins. In her official blog, Jenkins mentions that she may one day perform the routine in public. On 3 July 2010, Jenkins took the stage at Cheltenham Racecourse, with the National Symphony Orchestra. She was supported by violinist Diana Yukawa.

Jenkins performed at the opening night gala Llangollen International Musical Eisteddfod in July 2010.

During March and April 2013, Jenkins went on tour with Il Divo for their first and only European and UK tour. She also participated in the 2013 U.S. Memorial Day Concert in Washington, D.C., singing a selection from Andrew Lloyd Webber's Requiem and You'll Never Walk Alone from Rodgers and Hammerstein's Carousel.

On 9 May 2015, she performed at VE Day 70: A Party to Remember in Horse Guards Parade, London.

In 2017, Jenkins starred as the romantic lead Julie Jordan in Rodgers and Hammerstein's Carousel in a limited run at the English National Opera directed by Lonny Price, opposite musical theatre star Alfie Boe.

On 1 December 2020, the Katherine Jenkins Christmas Spectacular at the Royal Albert Hall was released as both a film in cinemas and on DVD.

== Television and film ==
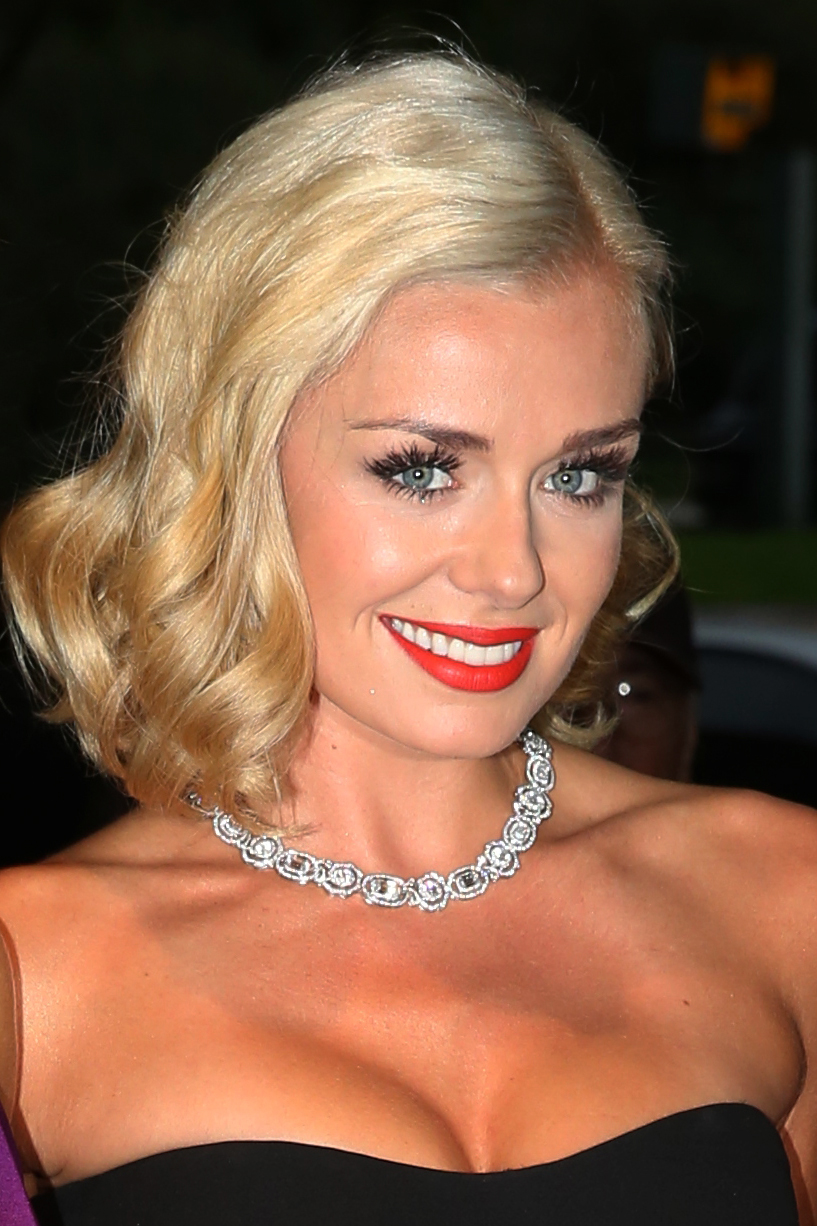
Jenkins in 2013

On 23 December 2006, Jenkins appeared on ITV's Parkinson show, backed by the Froncysyllte Male Voice Choir and a brass band.

She made a cameo appearance in two episodes of Emmerdale which saw 11.6 million viewers tune in to find out who killed popular character Tom King, who was murdered on Christmas Day. She also appeared in the show on 16 and 17 May 2007, which saw her opening the village pageant. In July 2007, she performed live on Saving Planet Earth on BBC 1 to raise money for the BBC Wildlife Fund.

On 12 August 2007 she appeared on ITV's Britain's Favourite View, nominating Three Cliffs Bay on the Gower Peninsula as Britain's favourite view. She commented; "I grew up on the edge of the Gower, but it was still a holiday place for our family. We'd go on weekend breaks to Three Cliffs Bay – six miles down the road! That's how gorgeous it is."

On 21 October 2007 she sang "Time to Say Goodbye" on the Strictly Come Dancing results show. Jenkins and Darcey Bussell performed a segment of their show Viva la Diva before the Queen at the 79th Royal Variety Performance, televised on 9 December 2007. On 15 December, Jenkins performed on The X Factor final with contestant Rhydian Roberts, performing the song "You Raise Me Up". She has sung on the BBC television programme Songs of Praise, and became a presenter in 2017.

Jenkins appeared in episode three of the fifth series of The Apprentice, performing Leonard Cohen's "Hallelujah" as part of a private recital to winning team Ignite. The programme aired on BBC One on 8 March 2009.

In 2009, Jenkins performed on a large number of TV shows – The Royal Variety Performance, Children In Need Rocks The Albert Hall, The Alan Titchmarsh Show, This Morning, GMTV, Something for the Weekend, The Paul O'Grady Show, presenting for the BBC the week-long series The Week We Went To War, Piers Morgan's Life Stories for ITV1, Strictly Come Dancing, The Graham Norton Show and The Andrew Marr Show.

Jenkins started 2010 by appearing as one of two mentors on ITV1s prime time Friday night show, Popstar to Operastar. Later in the year, she appeared on the ITV1 game show Magic Numbers, acting as magician and show host Stephen Mulhern's assistant in the UK TV premiere of an illusion in which she was sawed in half inside a clear box. She also appeared in the 2010 Christmas Special of Doctor Who, "A Christmas Carol", in which she played Abigail Pettigrew—her first major acting role. Jenkins appeared as the featured singer on 11 April 2011 episode of ABC's show Dancing with the Stars (DWTS) singing "Con te partirò" (Time to Say Goodbye) and "O mio babbino caro". She later sang "The Flower Duet" with DWTS regular Beverley Staunton.

On 23 October 2011, Jenkins appeared live on US television network, FOX from Wembley Stadium, performing "God Save the Queen" before the NFL game between the Tampa Bay Buccaneers and the Chicago Bears.

In 2012, she competed in the American Dancing with the Stars. She was partnered with two-time champion Mark Ballas. Jenkins and Ballas came runners-up in the competition.

On 20 and 21 July 2012, Jenkins sang in concert with the Mormon Tabernacle Choir in Salt Lake City, Utah at the annual Pioneer Day Concert 2012 broadcast on BYU-TV and various PBS television stations worldwide.

In April 2017, Jenkins appeared on Operation: Magic, a one-off magic show on ITV1, acting as the assistant to magician and Britain's Got Talent winner Richard Jones.

In June 2018, Jenkins performed 'Never Enough' from the film The Greatest Showman at the Classical Brit Awards at the Royal Albert Hall in London.

In 2020, Jenkins competed as "Octopus" on the first British series of The Masked Singer and finished in third place.

Jenkins made her feature film debut in Minamata (2020), which starred Johnny Depp.

== Personal life ==
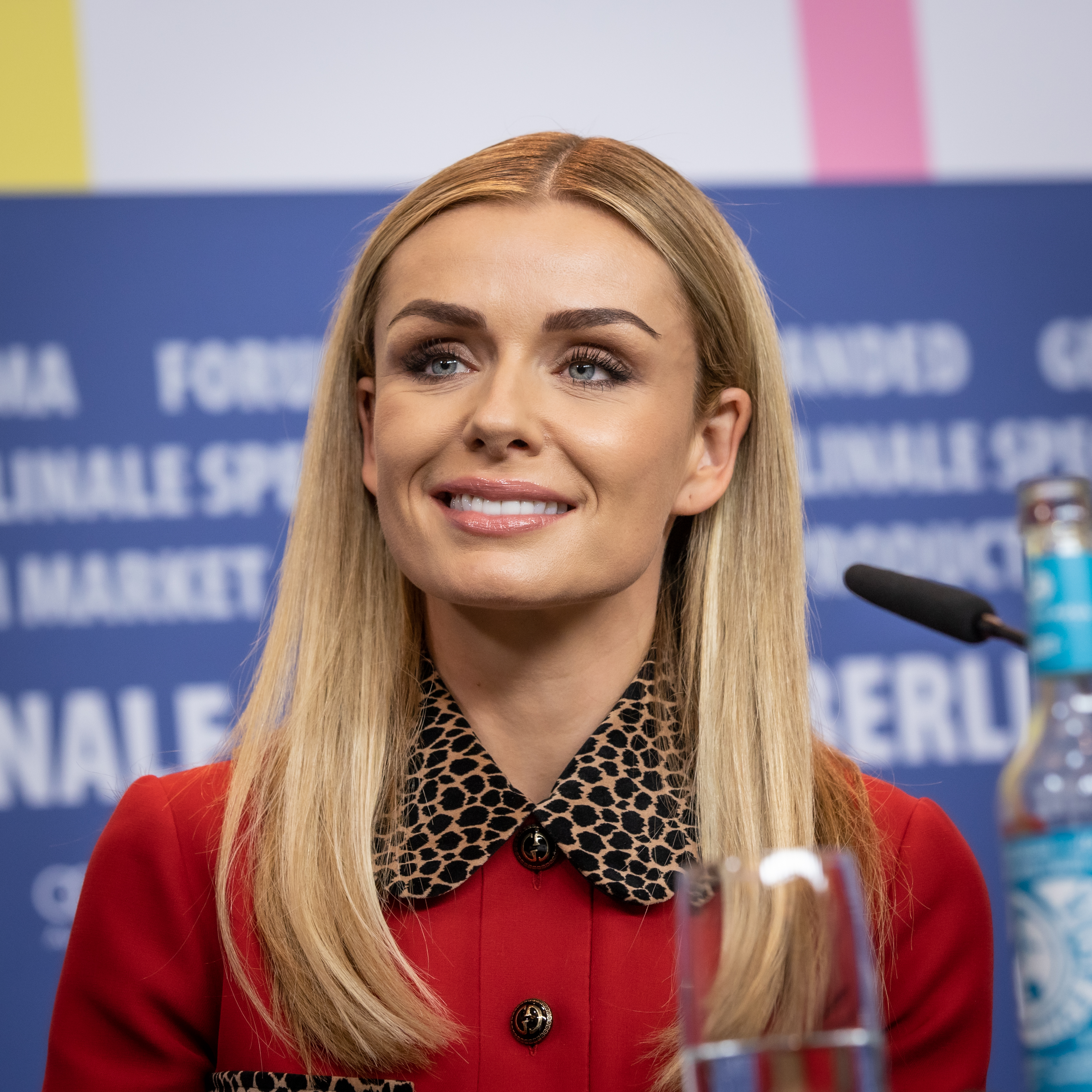
Jenkins in 2020

Jenkins is a Christian and says that she believes in Heaven: "I believe my dad is somewhere doing something nice." In memory of her father, she raised £25,000 for Macmillan Cancer Support by running the 2013 London Marathon. She finished the course in five hours and 26 minutes.

While Jenkins was studying at the Royal Academy of Music at the age of 19, she was attacked, beaten, and robbed by an unknown assailant, who attempted to rape her but she fought him off. She also began using drugs during this period of time, which she later said was "the biggest regret of [her] life".

Jenkins's autobiography, Time to Say Hello, was released on 28 January 2008 and was also serialised in The Mail on Sunday.

While in her 20s, Jenkins appeared in the British Richest Under 30 on the Sunday Times Rich List. She made her first appearance in 2007, ranked as the 62nd richest young person in Britain with an estimated wealth of £9 million (equivalent to £13.9 million in 2024). In 2010, the Sunday Times Rich List placed her at joint 11th on the Richest Under 30, tied with singers Leona Lewis and Charlotte Church, with an estimated wealth of £11 million (equivalent to £15.8 million in 2024).

Jenkins met television presenter Gethin Jones in 2007, and they became engaged in February 2011. On 30 December 2011 they announced that they were no longer together.

In October 2013, Jenkins began dating American painter Andrew Levitas. They announced their engagement in April 2014. They married at Hampton Court Palace on 27 September 2014, with the vicar from her hometown conducting a religious blessing. Jenkins gave birth to their first child, a daughter, in September 2015. Their son was born in April 2018.

Jenkins was appointed Officer of the Order of the British Empire (OBE) in the 2014 New Year Honours for her services to music and for charitable services.

=== Cygnet gin ===
In June 2023, Jenkins launched the Cygnet 22 range of gins. Jenkins said that she became a gin drinker because, unlike other types of alcohol, gin was typically "cleaner" to drink for singers, without affecting their voice. The name "cygnet" came from the term of a baby swan, an animal symbolic of her native Swansea. The number "22" refers to the age Jenkins was when she was offered the largest recording deal in classical music history. She describes the brand as "eco-friendly" as the bottles are 100% plastic-free, with a 100 percent biodegradable seal made from wood pulp in Wales. The Cygnet 22 bottle also weighs up to 50 percent less than the average spirits bottle, meaning it requires less raw materials to produce and less energy to transport.

On 16 March 2024, Jenkins made a pitch-side appearance before the Wales v Italy Six Nations Championship match to launch a canned Cygnet gin and tonic drink.

== Discography ==
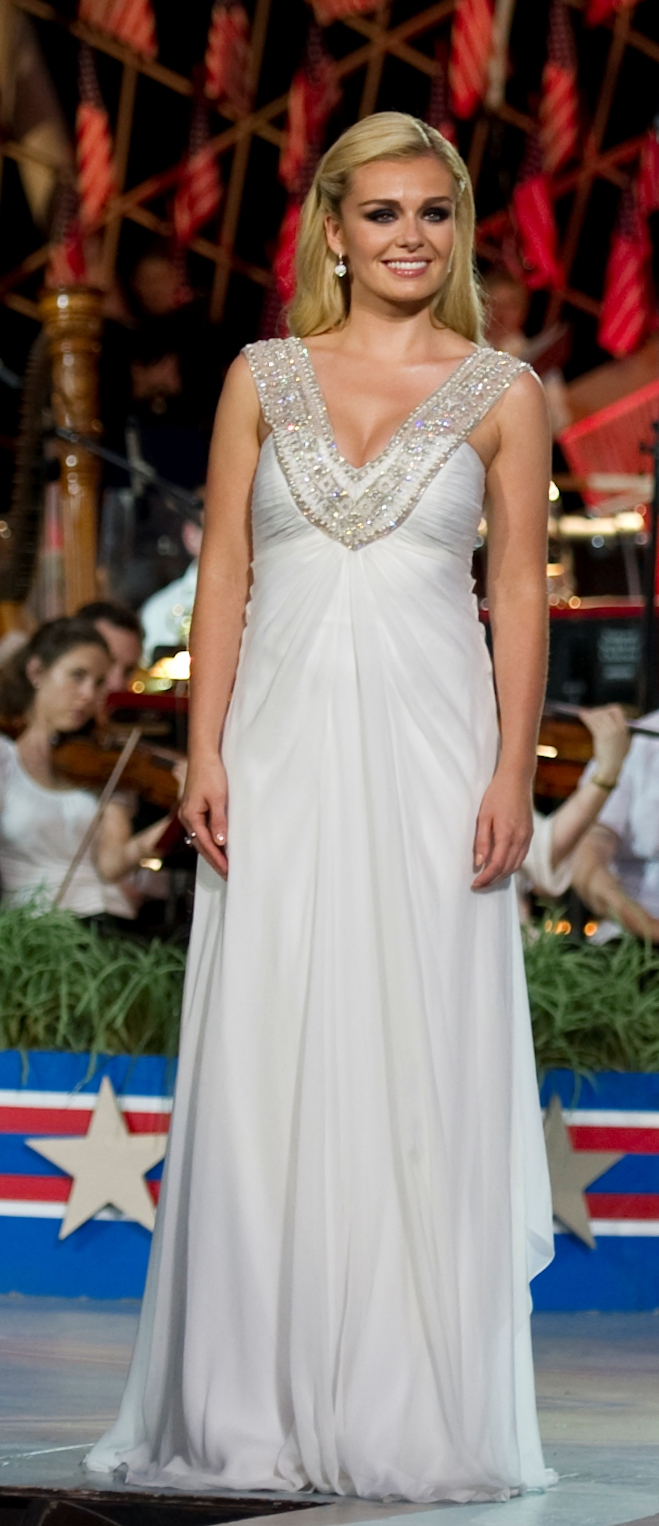
Jenkins at the U.S. Capitol in 2010

Studio albums

- Premiere (2004)
- Second Nature (2004)
- Living a Dream (2005)
- Serenade (2006)
- Rejoice (2007)
- Sacred Arias (2008)
- Believe (2009)
- Daydream (2011)
- This Is Christmas (2012)
- Home Sweet Home (2014)
- Celebration (2016)
- Guiding Light (2018)
- Cinema Paradiso (2020)

== Filmography ==
=== Film ===
Year	Title	Role	Notes
2020	Minamata	Millie	
2020	Dream Horse	Herself – performer	

=== Television ===
Year	Title	Role	Notes
2010	Doctor Who	Abigail Pettigrew	Episode: "A Christmas Carol"
2014	Under Milk Wood	Polly Garter	TV movie
2015	Live with Kelly and Ryan	Herself - Performer	
2016	Katherine Jenkins: Home for Christmas	Herself - Performer	TV movie documentary
2020	Katherine Jenkins at 40	Herself - Performer	TV movie documentary
2023	Christmas with Katherine Jenkins	Herself - Performer	Christmas Concert
