= Universal Classics and Jazz =

Name of two record label divisions of the Universal Music Group

Universal Classics and Jazz (UCJ) was the name of various record label divisions, as of 2013 one division, of the Universal Music Group record company.

== Post 2013 ==
In 2013, Universal Music Japan merged the two pre-2013 labels into one. The label name is now Universal Classics and Jazz (UM-CLJZ).

== Pre 2013 divisions ==
=== UCJ Germany ===
Universal Music Classics & Jazz (Germany) is a division of Universal Music Germany and is marketed under websites called Klassik Akzente and Jazz Echo.

=== UCJ Japan (a.k.a. UM-CLJZ) ===
This Universal Music Japan subsidiary formerly operated as two separate labels: Universal Classics and Universal Jazz.

== Earlier divisions ==
=== UCJ (UK) ===
UCJ Music logo

Universal Classics and Jazz was a division of the Universal Music Group based in London, United Kingdom. The UCJ roster included Jamie Cullum, Aled Jones, Nicola Benedetti and Katherine Jenkins.

At the time that Katherine Jenkins was signed to the label in 2003, she had signed the then-largest record deal in United Kingdom classical recording history, reportedly worth £1 million.

The label group was dismantled in 2011 with the restructuring of Universal Music UK's classical operations, as well Universal Music Group International's greater restructuring of its classical labels. The dismantling of UCJ ensued the revival of Decca Records in the UK, under the instigation of Max Hole, the newly appointed Chief operating officer (COO) of Universal Music Group International.
