= Barjansky Stradivarius =

Musical instrument

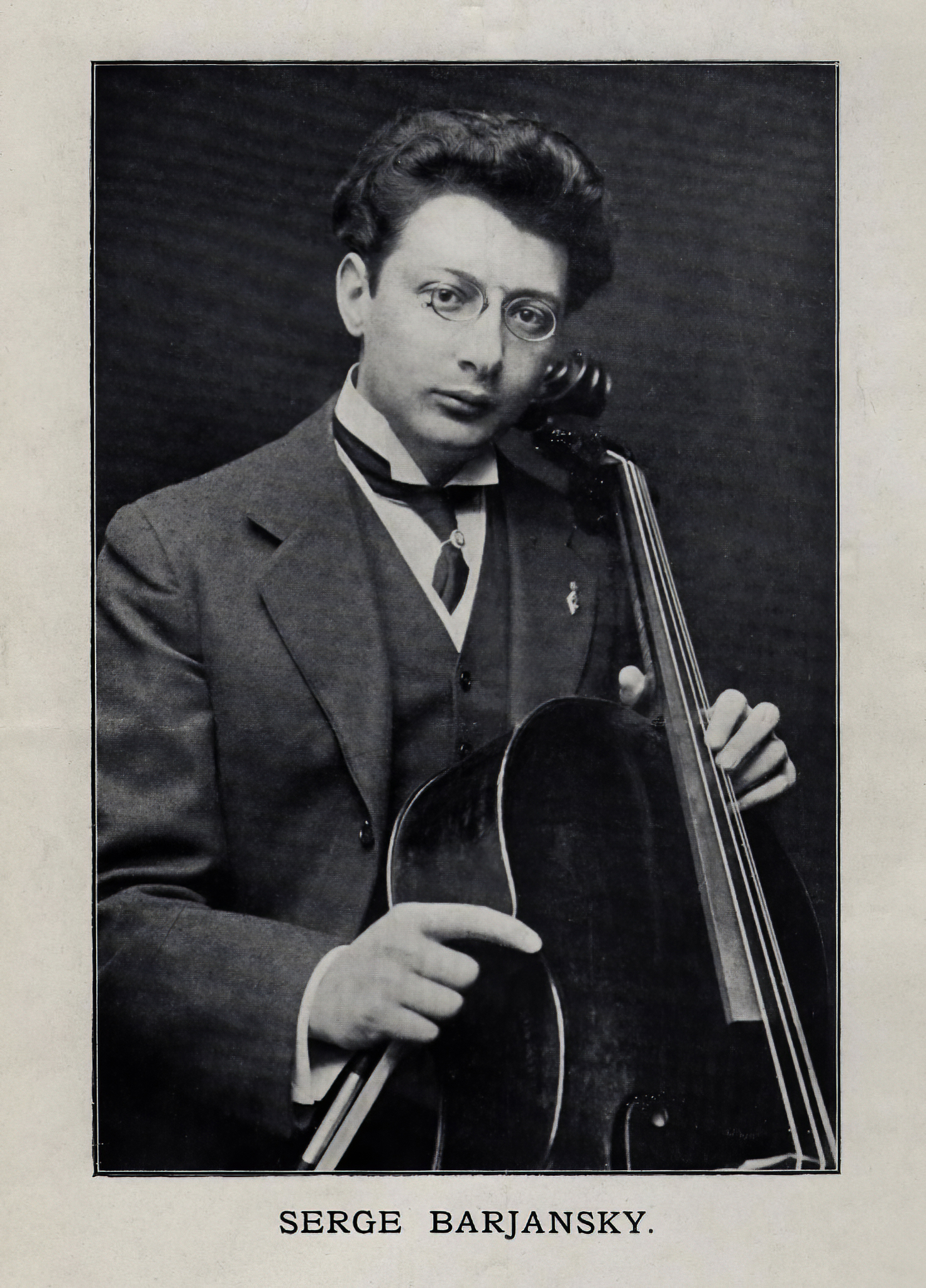
Serge Barjansky and the Barjansky Stradivarius, in 1910

The Barjansky Stradivarius of c.1690 is an antique cello fabricated by the Italian Cremonese luthier Antonio Stradivari (1644–1737).

== Eponym ==
The Barjansky is named after Russian cellist Serge Barjansky, who played the instrument during the first half of the 20th century.

== Age ==
The date of its making is unclear. In an interview with The Strad Julian Lloyd Webber said:

The catalogue date is 1684 and the label inside the cello says 1684. But before the sale I did some research on the instrument and found it listed rather erratically in Henley's book on Stradivari's instruments. It is listed there as the "Barjansky" Strad, 1736, the last cello he ever made. Dealers who know the cello think that it is certainly not so early as 1684 which is a good thing. According to the Henley book he didn't really establish his cello model until round about 1707 at which time the cello was only first becoming established as a solo instrument."

== Description ==
The Sotheby's 1983 catalogue describes the Barjansky Stradivarius as being 29 7/8 inches (76 cm) along the back, with a golden brown varnish.

== History ==
Barjansky was the previous owner when the Cremonese cello came up for auction at Sotheby's in 1983. It sold for a record price to British cellist Julian Lloyd Webber whose previous instrument was a Guadagnini of the 1700s. The purchase price was undisclosed.

The comparable Pawle Stradivarius cello sold around that time for $650,000 in New York. Itzhak Perlman bought the 1714 Soil Stradivari from Yehudi Menuhin for £600,000 in 1986 (equivalent to £1,800,000 in 2025). Another Stradivarius cello, broken when it fell during a photoshoot in Spain in April 2012, was valued by Sotheby's at $20 million.

Since then the Barjansky Stradivarius has been played by Lloyd Webber, who has made more than 30 award-winning recordings on the instrument, including a renowned version of Elgar Cello Concerto, conducted by Yehudi Menuhin.

Chapter Eight of Margaret Campbell's biography of Lloyd Webber, Married to Music, is called "The Barjansky" Strad.

The Barjansky Stradivarius has reportedly been offered for sale by the violin expert Florian Leonhard.

== Recordings made with the Barjansky ==
=== Works with orchestra ===
- Edward Elgar - Cello Concerto, Royal Philharmonic Orchestra/Sir Yehudi Menuhin, r.1985, Philips Classics – chosen as the 'finest ever version’ by BBC Music Magazine and winner of ‘Best Classical Recording’ 1997 Brit Awards.
- Victor Herbert - Cello Concerto No. 2, London Symphony Orchestra/Sir Charles Mackerras, r.1986, EMI Classics
- Arthur Sullivan - Cello Concerto, (World Premiere Recording) - London Symphony Orchestra/Sir Charles Mackerras, r.1986, EMI Classics
- Edward Elgar - Romance, (World Premiere Recording) - London Symphony Orchestra/Sir Charles Mackerras, r.1986, EMI Classics
- Antonín Dvořák - Cello Concerto, Czech Philharmonic Orchestra/Vaclav Neumann, r.1988, Philips Classics. This recording is the subject of Tony Palmer's documentary Dvorak - in Love?, released on DVD in 2014.
- Arthur Honegger - Cello Concerto, English Chamber Orchestra/Yan Pascal Tortelier, r.1990, Philips Classics
- Camille Saint-Saëns - Cello Concerto No. 1, English Chamber Orchestra/Yan Pascal Tortelier, r.1990, Philips Classics
- Camille Saint-Saëns - Allegro Appassionato, English Chamber Orchestra/Yan Pascal Tortelier, r.1990, Philips Classics
- Vincent d’Indy - Lied (World Premiere Recording), English Chamber Orchestra/Yan Pascal Tortelier, r.1990, Philips Classics
- Faure - Elegie, English Chamber Orchestra/Yan Pascal Tortelier, r.1990, Philips Classics
- Pyotr Ilyich Tchaikovsky - Variations on a Rococo Theme, London Symphony Orchestra/Maxim Shostakovich, r.1991, Philips Classics
- Pyotr Ilyich Tchaikovsky – Nocturne, Op 19 no. 4, London Symphony Orchestra/Maxim Shostakovich, r.1991, Philips Classics
- Nikolai Myaskovsky - Cello Concerto, London Symphony Orchestra/Maxim Shostakovich, r.1991, Philips Classics
- Dmitry Shostakovich - Adagio from ‘The Limpid Stream’ (World Premiere Recording) London Symphony Orchestra/Maxim Shostakovich, r.1991, Philips Classics
- Gavin Bryars - Cello Concerto (World Premiere Recording) English Chamber Orchestra/James Judd, r.1994, Philips Classics
- Benjamin Britten - Cello Symphony, Academy of Saint Martin-in-the-Fields/Sir Neville Marriner, r.1995, Philips Classics
- William Walton - Cello Concerto, Academy of St Martin in the Fields – Sir Neville Marriner, r.1995, Philips Classics
- Michael Nyman - Concerto for Cello, Saxophone and orchestra, (World Premiere Recording) Philharmonia Orchestra/Michael Nyman, r.1996, EMI Classics
- Max Bruch - Kol Nidrei, Royal Philharmonic Orchestra/James Judd, r.1998, Philips Classics
- Granville Bantock - Sapphic Poem, (World Premiere Recording) Royal Philharmonic Orchestra/Vernon Handley, r.1999, Hyperion
- Philip Glass - Cello Concerto, (World Premiere Recording) Royal Liverpool Philharmonic Orchestra/ Gerard Schwarz, r.2003, Orange Mountain
- Andrew Lloyd Webber - Phantasia for violin, cello and orchestra, (World Premiere Recording), w. Sarah Chang, violin, The London Orchestra/Simon Lee, r.2004, EMI Classics
- Eric Whitacre - "The River Cam", (World Premiere Recording) London Symphony Orchestra/Eric Whitacre, r.2012, Decca
- Vivaldi Concertos for Two Cellos, w. Jiaxin Lloyd Webber (World Premiere Recordings) European Union Chamber Orchestra, r.2014, Naxos
- Piazzolla - Milonga, w. Jiaxin Lloyd Webber (World Premiere Recordings) European Union Chamber Orchestra, r.2014, Naxos
- Howard Goodall - “And the Bridge is Love” (World Premiere Recording) English Chamber Orchestra, r.2015, Naxos

=== Works with piano ===
- Malcolm Arnold - Fantasy for Cello, (World Premiere Recording) r.1986, ASV
- Alan Rawsthorne - Cello Sonata, John McCabe (piano), r.1986, ASV
- Benjamin Britten - Cello Sonata, John McCabe (piano), r.1988, Philips Classics
- Sergei Prokofiev - Ballade, (World Premiere Recording) John McCabe (piano), r.1988, Philips Classics
- Dmitri Shostakovich - Cello Sonata, John McCabe (piano), r.1988, Philips Classics
- Frank Bridge - Scherzetto, (World Premiere Recording), John McCabe (piano), r.1991, ASV
- Charles Villiers Stanford - Cello Sonata No. 2, (World Premiere Recording) John McCabe, r.1991, ASV
- Edvard Grieg - Cello Sonata, Bengt Forsberg (piano), r.1995, Philips Classics
- Edvard Grieg - Intermezzo (World Premiere Recording), Philips Classics
- Frederick Delius - Cello Sonata, Bengt Forsberg (piano), r.1995, Philips Classics
- Frederick Delius - Caprice and Elegy, Bengt Forsberg (piano), r.1993, Philips Classics
- Frederick Delius - Serenade from ‘Hassan’, Bengt Forsberg (piano), r.1993, Philips Classics

=== Semi-classical ===
- Oasis, (World Premiere Recording) with Peter Skellern and Mary Hopkin, r.1984 Warner
- Two Worlds, with Lee Ritenour and Dave Grusin, r.2000, Decca

=== Collections ===
- Travels with my Cello, English Chamber Orchestra/Nicholas Cleobury, r.1984, Philips Classics
- Encore! – Travels with my Cello Vol.2, Royal Philharmonic Orchestra/ Nicholas Cleobury, r.1986, Philips Classics
- Cello Song, John Lenehan (piano), r.1993, Philips Classics
- English Idyll, Academy of St Martin-in-the-Fields, Sir Neville Marriner, r.1994, Philips Classics
- Cradle Song, John Lenehan (piano), Richard Rodney Bennett (piano), Pam Chowhan (piano), r.1995, Philips Classics
- Cello Moods, Royal Philharmonic Orchestra/James Judd, r.1998, Philips Classics
- Elegy, r.1999, Philips Classics
- Lloyd Webber Plays Lloyd Webber, r.2001, Philips Classics
- Made in England / Gentle Dreams, r.2003, Decca
- Unexpected Songs, John Lenehan (piano), Pam Chowhan (piano), Catrin Finch (harp), Michael Ball, r.2006, EMI Classics
- Fair Albion - Music by Patrick Hawes, (World Premiere Recordings) r.2009, Signum Classics
- The Art of Julian Lloyd Webber, r.2011, Decca
- Evening Songs – Music by Frederick Delius and John Ireland, w. Jiaxin Lloyd Webber (cello), John Lenehan (piano), r.2012, Naxos
- A Tale of Two Cellos, w. Jiaxin Lloyd Webber (cello), John Lenehan (piano), Catrin Finch (harp), r.2013, Naxos

== First performances using the Barjansky ==
- Frederick Delius, Cello Concerto, Frankfurt, Germany, January 1923
- Vaughan Williams, Fantasia on Sussex Folk Tunes for Cello and Orchestra, Three Choirs Festival, Gloucester, August 1983
- Edward Elgar, Romance for Cello and Piano, Wigmore Hall, London, April 1985
- Arthur Sullivan, Cello Concerto, London Symphony Orchestra/Mackerras, Barbican Centre, London, April 1986
- Malcolm Arnold, Fantasy for Cello, Wigmore Hall, London, December 1987
- Malcolm Arnold, Cello Concerto, Royal Philharmonic Orchestra/Handley, Royal Festival Hall, London, March 1989
- Richard Rodney Bennett, Dream Sequence for Cello and Piano, John Lenehan (piano), Wigmore Hall, London, December 1994
- Vladimir Godar, Barcarolle for Cello, Strings, Harp and Harpsichord, Hellenic Centre, London, April 1994
- Gavin Bryars, Cello Concerto (Farewell to Philosophy), English Chamber Orchestra/James Judd, Barbican Centre, London, November 1995
- William Lloyd Webber, Nocturne for Cello and Piano, John Lill (piano), Purcell Room, London, February 1995
- Christopher Headington, Serenade for Cello and Strings, English Chamber Orchestra, Banqueting House, London, January 1995
- Michael Nyman, Concerto for Cello and Saxophone, Philharmonia/James Judd, Royal Festival Hall, London, March 1997
- William Walton, Theme for a Prince for Solo Cello, Adrian Boult Hall, Birmingham, October 1998
- Karl Jenkins, Benedictus for Cello, Choir and Orchestra from 'The Armed Man', National Youth Choir of Great Britain and the National
- Musicians Symphony Orchestra, Royal Albert Hall, London, April 2000
- Philip Glass, Cello Concerto, China Philharmonic Orchestra/Long Yu, Beijing Festival, China, September 2001
- James MacMillan, Cello Sonata No.2, John Lenehan (piano), Queens Hall, Edinburgh, April 2001
- Howard Goodall, And the Bridge is Love for Cello and Strings Festival Orchestra/Thomas Hull, Chipping Campden Festival, May 2008
- Patrick Hawes, Gloriette for Cello and Piano, Leeds Castle, Kent, August 2008
- Andrew Lloyd Webber, Phantasia (Concerto for Violin, Cello and Orchestra), Izmir Festival, Turkey, July 2008
- Eric Whitacre, The River Cam for cello and strings, Philharmonia Orchestra/Whitacre, Royal Festival Hall, London, April 2011

All first performances were by Julian Lloyd Webber, except the January 1923 concerto by Alexandre Barjansky.
