= Barjansky =

Barjansky may refer to:

- Alexandre Barjansky (December 1883 – 1946) Russian cellist, second cousin of Serge
  - the Barjansky Stradivarius cello named in his honor
- Serge Barjansky (April/May 1883 – May 1940) Russian cellist, second cousin of Alexandre
