= And the Bridge Is Love =

Studio album by Julian Lloyd Webber
- Released: March 2015
- Recorded: April 2014
- Genre: Classical
- Label: Naxos Records

And the Bridge Is Love is a work for cello and strings by the English composer Howard Goodall (b. 1958). It is also the title track of the recording of the same name by Julian Lloyd Webber and the English Chamber Orchestra, released in 2015.

And the Bridge Is Love was commissioned by the Chipping Campden Festival and premiered in 2008. It is dedicated to a young cellist, Hannah Ryan, a close family friend of the Goodalls who died in 2007 at the age of seventeen.

== Track listing ==
1. "Introduction and Allegro for Strings, Op. 47" by Edward Elgar
2. "Sospiri, Op.70" by Edward Elgar
3. "The Moon" by William Lloyd Webber
4. "And the Bridge Is Love" by Howard Goodall
5. "Prelude from 'Charterhouse Suite'" by Ralph Vaughan Williams
6. "Serenade for Strings" by Edward Elgar
7. "Two Aquarelles" by Frederick Delius
8. "Chanson de Nuit" by Edward Elgar
9. "Chanson de Matin" by Edward Elgar
10. "Two Pieces for Strings from Henry V" by William Walton
11. "A Downland Suite: No. 3 Minuet"' by John Ireland
