= Elegy (Julian Lloyd Webber album) =

Studio album by Julian Lloyd Webber
- Released: 1998
- Genre: Classical
- Label: Philips

Julian Lloyd Webber Collections chronology
Cello Moods (1998)	Elegy (1998)	Lloyd Webber Plays Lloyd Webber (2001)

Elegy is an album recorded by the cellist Julian Lloyd Webber in 1998 for Philips.

== Track listing ==
1. Elegie (Gabriel Fauré)
2. Adagio (Tomaso Albinoni)
3. Le cygne (Camille Saint-Saëns)
4. Nocturne (Evert Taube)
5. Jesus bleibet meine Freude (Johann Sebastian Bach)
6. "Song of the Indian Merchant" (Nikolai Rimsky-Korsakov)
7. Clair de lune (Claude Debussy)
8. "Ave Maria" (Bach, Charles Gounod)
9. Cello Concerto (Adagio-moderato) (Edward Elgar)
10. "Beau Soir" (Debussy)
11. "Songs My Mother Taught Me" (Antonín Dvořák)
12. "To the Spring" (Edvard Grieg)
13. Cantata BWV 156 (Adagio) (Bach)
14. Träumerei (Robert Schumann)
15. "Brezairola" (Joseph Canteloube)
16. "Song of the Black Swan" (Heitor Villa-Lobos)
17. Shepherd's Lullaby (Thomas J. Hewitt)
18. Itsuki Lullaby (San-Lang)
19. Requiem (Pie Jesu) (Andrew Lloyd Webber)

== Personnel ==
- Julian Lloyd Webber
- Pamela Chowhan
- John Lenehan
- Sven-Bertil Taube
- English Chamber Orchestra
- Royal Philharmonic Orchestra
- Yehudi Menuhin
- Nicholas Cleobury
- Barry Wordsworth
- Yan Pascal Tortelier
