= Travels with My Cello =

Travels with My Cello may refer to:

- Travels with My Cello (book), a 1984 autobiography by Julian Lloyd Webber
- Travels with My Cello (album), a 1984 album by Julian Lloyd Webber
