= Song for Baba =

1995 composition

From the cover of the US edition of Cradle Song/Lullaby

"Song for Baba" is a piece of music for cello and piano composed by Julian Lloyd Webber inspired by the birth of his son, David. It is the opening number on Lloyd Webber's 1995 album Cradle Song. It also appears on his 2003 album Made in England, the 2011 album The Art of Julian Lloyd Webber and the 2012 6-disc Decca collection 101 Cello. Pamela Chowhan plays the piano part.
