= Made in England / Gentle Dreams =

Made in England

Studio album by Julian Lloyd Webber
- Released: 2003
- Label: Universal Classics/Philips

Julian Lloyd Webber Collections chronology
Celebration (2001)	Made in England (2003)	Unexpected Songs (2006)

Made in England is a two-CD-set album released by the cellist Julian Lloyd Webber in 2003.

== Track listing ==
=== CD 1 ===
1. Antônio Carlos Jobim: The Girl from Ipanema
2. Julian Lloyd Webber: Kheira's Theme
3. George Gershwin: Bess, You Is My Woman Now
4. Secret Garden: Duo
5. J. S. Bach: Air on the G String
6. Massenet: Meditation from Thaïs
7. J. S. Bach: Siciliana
8. Xavier Montsalvatge: Cradle Song
9. Cyril Scott: Lullaby
10. Debussy: Beau Soir
11. Fauré: Berceuse (Dolly Suite)
12. Andrew Lloyd Webber: The Music of the Night (from The Phantom of the Opera)
13. Heitor Villa-Lobos: Bachianas Brasileiras No. 4
14. Debussy: Clair de lune
15. Castelnuovo-Tedesco: Sea Murmurs
16. Julian Lloyd Webber: Song for Baba
17. Dave Heath: Gentle Dreams
18. Andrew Lloyd Webber: Pie Jesu
19. Max Bruch: Kol Nidrei

=== CD 2 ===
1. Elton John: Your Song (with piano by Elton John)
2. Vladimir Vavilov, ascribed to Caccini: Ave Maria
3. Traditional (arr Grainger): Brigg Fair
4. Evert Taube: Nocturne
5. Dvořák: Songs My Mother Taught Me
6. Elgar: Chanson de Matin
7. Franck: Panis Angelicus
8. Fauré: Elegie
9. Elgar: First movement (cello concerto)
10. Julian Lloyd Webber: Jackie's Song
11. Bach/Gounod: Ave Maria
12. Hewitt: Shepherd's Lullaby
13. Vangelis: Un Apres Midi
14. J. S. Bach: Adagio in G
15. Saint-Saëns: Le cygne (from The Carnival of the Animals)
16. Albinoni: Adagio
17. J. S. Bach: Jesu, Joy of Man's Desiring
18. Andrew Lloyd Webber: Theme and Variations 1–4
19. Rimsky-Korsakov: The Flight of the Bumblebee
