= The Art of Julian Lloyd Webber =

Studio album by Julian Lloyd Webber
- Released: 2011
- Genre: Classical
- Label: Universal Classics

The Art of Julian Lloyd Webber is a 2011 album by Julian Lloyd Webber.

== Track listing ==
Disc 1

1. "Cello Concerto 1st Movement" by Edward Elgar
2. "The Swan" by Saint-Saëns
3. "Salut d'amour" by Edward Elgar
4. "Clair de Lune" by Claude Debussy
5. "Meditation from Thais" by Jules Massenet
6. "Jesu, Joy of Man's Desiring" by Bach
7. "Air on the G string" by Bach
8. "Pie Jesu" by Andrew Lloyd Webber
9. "Allegro Appassionato" by Saint-Saëns
10. "Songs My Mother Taught Me" by Antonín Dvořák
11. "Song of the Black Swan" by Heitor Villa-Lobos
12. "Nocturne" by Alexander Borodin
13. "To Spring" by Grieg
14. "Ave Maria" by Giulio Caccini
15. "Chanson de Matin" by Edward Elgar
16. "Romanza for cello and orchestra" by Ralph Vaughan Williams
17. "Siciliana" by Bach
18. "Duo (with Secret Garden)" by Rolf Lovland
19. "The Girl from Ipanema" by Antonio Carlos Jobim

Disc 2

1. "Arioso for 2 cellos and strings" by Gian Carlo Menotti
2. "Music of the Night" by Andrew Lloyd Webber
3. "Nocturne" by Tchaikovsky
4. "Adagio" by Albinoni
5. "Ave Maria" by Bach
6. "Panis Angelicus" by Franck
7. "Elegie" by Fauré
8. "Nocturne" by Taube
9. "Adagio in G" by Bach
10. "Brigg Fair" by Grainger
11. "Reverie" by Claude Debussy
12. "Slow Movement from Cello Concerto in B flat" by Boccherini
13. "Mary's Lullaby" by John Rutter
14. "Song for Baba" by Julian Lloyd Webber
15. "Cradle Song" by Brahms
16. "Kol Nidrei" by Bruch
17. "Flight of the Bumble Bee" by Rimsky-Korsakov
18. "Theme from the South Bank Show" by Andrew Lloyd Webber

== Recording ==
The recording of Gian Carlo Menotti's Arioso is a world premiere in this version.

== Artists involved ==
- Julian Lloyd Webber, Cello
- Jiaxin Cheng, Cello
- Royal Philharmonic Orchestra
- London Symphony Orchestra
- Academy of St. Martin in the Fields
- English Chamber Orchestra
- Yehudi Menuhin
- Neville Marriner
- Maxim Shostakovich
- Yan Pascal Tortelier
