= Celebration (Julian Lloyd Webber album) =

Studio album by Julian Lloyd Webber
- Released: 2001
- Genre: Orchestral
- Length: 2hrs 29mins
- Label: BMG UK

Julian Lloyd Webber Collections chronology
Lloyd Webber Plays Lloyd Webber (2001)	Celebration (2001)	Made in England / Gentle Dreams (2003)

Celebration is a two CD set album released by the cellist Julian Lloyd Webber in 2001.

== Track listing ==
1. Rodrigo Concierto como un Divertimento (world premiere recording)
2. Lalo Cello Concerto -London Philharmonic Orchestra/Jesus Lopez-Cobos
3. Delius Cello Concerto
4. Holst Invocation (world premiere recording)
5. Vaughan Williams Fantasia on Sussex Folk Tunes (world premiere recording)- Philharmonia Orchestra/Vernon Handley
6. Canteloube - Bailero (Shepherd's Song )
7. De Falla - Ritual Fire Dance Filmed Performance on YouTube
8. Saint-Saëns - Softly Awakes My Heart (from Samson and Delilah
9. Bridge - Sherzetto Filmed Performance on YouTube
10. Fauré - Élegie Filmed Performance on YouTube
11. Villa-Lobos - Bachianas Brasilieras No.5
12. J.S. Bach - Arioso Filmed Performance on YouTube
13. Popper - Gavotte No.2 Filmed Performance on YouTube
14. Delius - Serenade from Hassan
15. Bruch - Kol Nidrei
