= Encore! (Travels with My Cello – Volume 2) =

Studio album by Julian Lloyd Webber
- Released: 1986
- Label: Philips

Encore! (Travels with My Cello – Volume 2) is a 1986 studio album by the British cellist Julian Lloyd Webber, a sequel to the 1984 collection Travels with my Cello.

Track listing:

1. Bless, You is My Woman Now by Gershwin
2. Nocturne by Taube
3. Rondo alla Turca by Mozart
4. Claire de Lune by Debussy
5. Skye Boat Song by Traditional
6. Habanera by Bizet
7. Un Apres-midi by Vangelis
8. Song of the Seashore by Narita
9. When I'm Sixty-Four by Lennon–McCartney
10. Somewhere by Bernstein
11. Jesu. Joy of Man's Desiring by Bach
12. Chant Hindou by Rimsky-Korsakov
13. You are My Heart's Delight by Lehár

Royal Philharmonic Orchestra/Nicholas Cleobury

Philips CD 416 698-2

The picture from the back cover of the CD
