= Cello Concerto (Walton) =

1957 Concerto by William Walton

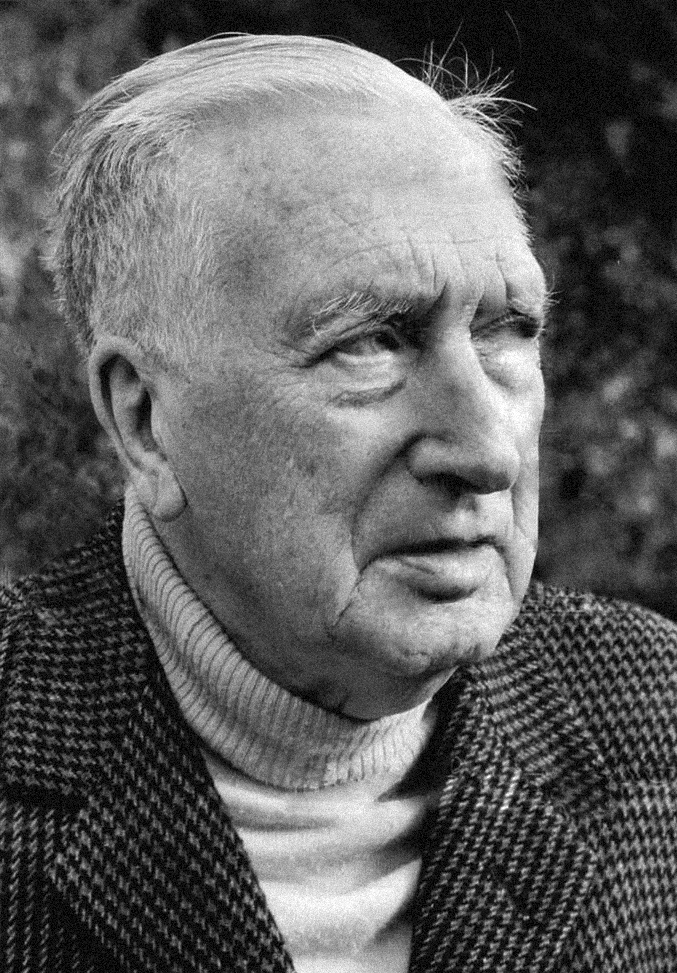
William Walton in 1976

William Walton's Cello Concerto (1957) is the third and last of the composer's concertos for string instruments, following his Viola Concerto (1929) and Violin Concerto (1939). It was written between February and October 1956, commissioned by and dedicated to the cellist Gregor Piatigorsky, the soloist at the premiere in Boston on 25 January 1957.

Initial responses to the work were mixed. Some reviewers thought the work old-fashioned, and others called it a masterpiece. Piatigorsky predicted that it would enter the international concert repertoire, and his recording has been followed by numerous others by soloists from four continents.

== Background and first performances ==
Walton had been regarded as avant garde in his youth, but by 1957, when he was in his mid-fifties, he was seen as a composer in the romantic tradition, and some thought him old-fashioned by comparison with his younger English contemporary Benjamin Britten. After his only full-length opera, Troilus and Cressida (1954), Covent Garden announced that his next major work would be a ballet score for the 1955–1956 season. The ballet, a version of Macbeth, fell through, because Margot Fonteyn, for whom it was intended, did not warm to the idea of playing Lady Macbeth. By the time an alternative subject was agreed, Walton was committed to writing a cello concerto and his ballet score never materialised. (Note: At Walton's suggestion Covent Garden instead commissioned Hans Werner Henze, who composed the music for Ondine.) The commission for the concerto was $3,000 – a substantial sum at the time. Walton commented that as a professional composer he would write anything for anybody, but "I write much better if they pay me in dollars".

The concerto, commissioned by the cellist Gregor Piatigorsky, followed the conventional concerto form to the extent of having three contrasting movements. As with his earlier Violin Concerto, written for Jascha Heifetz, Walton worked in close collaboration with the soloist while composing the work, mostly by correspondence between the composer from his home on Ischia and the cellist, touring internationally. Piatigorsky remarked that the world in the 20th century got its cello concertos from England – those of Elgar and Delius and then Walton.

The premiere was postponed from December 1956 because Piatigorsky was ill. It took place at Symphony Hall, Boston, with the Boston Symphony Orchestra conducted by Charles Munch. It received its first British performance within weeks, on 13 February 1957, again with Piatigorsky, this time with the BBC Symphony Orchestra under Sir Malcolm Sargent at the Royal Festival Hall. The work was first recorded shortly after the premiere, with the original forces.

== Analysis ==
The concerto is in three movements, but does not follow the conventional concerto form of a brisk opening movement followed by a slow movement: like Walton's earlier concertos for viola and violin, the Cello Concerto has a moderately paced opening movement followed by a much quicker central scherzo. (Note: The musical analyst Anthony Burton comments that this pattern is similar to that of Prokofiev’s First Violin Concerto, which, he suggests, may have been Walton’s original model.)

The concerto is scored for 2 flutes (second doubling piccolo), 2 oboes (second doubling cor anglais), 2 clarinets (second doubling bass clarinet), 2 bassoons (second doubling contrabassoon), 4 horns, 2 trumpets, 3 trombones, tuba, timpani, 3 percussionists (vibraphone, xylophone, suspended cymbal, bass drum, castanets, snare drum), celesta, harp, and strings.

The three movements are:

1. Moderato
2. Allegro appassionato
3. Tema ed improvvisazioni (Theme and improvisations)

=== I. Moderato ===
The movement is in C major. The music critic Frank Howes has written that the concerto "starts with a splash, as of a stone dropped into a pool, a chord on the vibraphone and hard, trills on a viola and an oscillating figure on the wind and upper strings." The opening continues with an expressive cello melody over a "tick-tock" pizzicato accompaniment, which dominates the movement. Walton's biographer Michael Kennedy calls the long opening theme "comprehensive and chromatic, with ambiguously unstable tonality … a seductively amorous invention". A secondary theme, marked allegro tranquillo presents a descending pattern of semiquavers in tandem with the "tick-tock" motif, leading eventually to the return of the first theme over a woodwind accompaniment. The movement ends in what Howes calls "a prolonged diatonic cadence" in which the last bars drop through five octaves.

=== II. Allegro appassionato ===
The key of the second movement is ambiguous; there is no key signature in the score, and analysts have described it as basically in C♯ minor or A minor. The movement is described by Kennedy as "a typically Waltonian firework display". Howes comments that although it has the appearance of a scherzo, the allegro appassionato marking points to its being the emotional core of the work, as well as the most substantial and highly organised of the three movements. It differs from conventional scherzos not only by its emotional force but by the absence of a trio section. The energetic main theme twice briefly gives way to cello leads to a lyrical phrase at a slightly slower tempo, but this tempo alternates with and then gives way to the original speed. Kennedy describes the orchestral scoring as light and transparent, with colourful but discreet percussion, including celeste and vibraphone. To end the virtuoso display the soloist plays a rising C♯ minor scale, with a harmonic on high C♯, marked col legno.

=== III. Tema ed improvvisazioni ===
The C major finale, the longest of the three movements, consists of a theme and four "improvisations" – individual episodes loosely based on elements of the theme, often the quartal harmonies beneath, followed by an extended coda. It reverts to the mood of the first movement, with an elaborate theme for the cello in its high register over a pizzicato in the orchestral strings. The theme presents rising and falling patterns in its opening bars, followed by a series of descending triads and a pair of rising scales.

A passage for solo cello links the theme to the first improvisation, in which the outline of the theme is given in the orchestral part, at a constant tempo throughout – "a shimmer of tremolando strings and the exotic interventions of xylophone, vibraphone, celesta, and harp". Against this is a cello counter-melody in triplet rhythms. The second improvisation is a virtuoso display for the unaccompanied soloist, marked brioso (vivaciously). Both Howes and Burton comment that this bravura section serves instead of the usual concerto cadenza. The third improvisation is a brilliant orchestral toccata; Howes calls it "a rumbustious affair with a good deal of percussion, glissandi for horns and harps, use of the piccolo and such excitements." The fourth, for unaccompanied cello, is marked "rhapsodically" (rapsodicamente), and has wide fluctuations of speed; it ends with high trills, which merge into the coda.

The coda refers back to themes from the first movement, first an upward-striving figure from its central section and then the opening melody, before the theme of the finale returns in compressed from, leading the movement towards a quiet, luminous ending, and a bottom C from the cello. Kennedy comments, "It is a stony heart that cannot respond to the urgings of this work's coda", but during the composition Piatigorsky hankered after a more bravura ending. Walton composed two alternative ones, but the original quiet conclusion was played at the premiere and has remained the standard version.

In 1974 the composer reconsidered the ending and wondered if Piatigorsky (and Heifetz, who shared the cellist's view) might have been right. Walton composed a third ending and sent it to Piatigorsky, but by then the cellist was mortally ill and he never performed it. The original ending has remained the standard one, although recordings of the alternative coda have been released (see "Recordings", below).

== Reception ==
The critics were divided over the merits of the concerto after the premiere. A reviewer in Boston wrote that the piece was "fine, warm and melodious", although more a rhapsody than a concerto. The critic thought the work superbly constructed, but old-fashioned: "what dissonance there is would not alarm an elderly aunt". The same view was taken by Peter Heyworth in The Observer after the British premiere; he wrote that there was little in the work that would have startled an audience in the year that the Titanic met its iceberg. Even though Heyworth thought the concerto showed a marked "stagnation" in Walton's recent music, he praised the "singularly lovely epilogue, whose hushed, tranquil air seems to capture a vista of a calm sea spreading out into the night". The reviewer in The Manchester Guardian called the work "a modern masterpiece" showing the composer at his freshest and most inspired, substituting for the melancholy of Walton's "great concertos of the thirties" "something more serene". The Times, considering the Cello Concerto along with the earlier concertos, remarked that Walton was not a progressive composer but each of his works was stamped with his musical personality –"wit, coruscating and explosive energy, and a half-wistful, half-contented romantic brooding … the produce of an aristocratic mind." Kennedy writes that although the work is "beautifully written, grateful to play and presents the listener with few problems", it is "too relaxed for its own good", occasionally episodic and inclined to re-use familiar Walton mannerisms.

Walton found Piatigorsky's input to the composition valuable and a comfort. When, later, he embarked on writing his Second Symphony he wrote to the cellist, "I miss your sympathetic guidance [and] help to spur me on. For you indeed spurred me on with my concerto which I consider one of my best works". The cellist Daniel Müller-Schott has written that players and listeners can sense in the music "the world of nature … the whole atmosphere of Italy. The golden rays of the sun, the different colours of [Ischia's] light, the blue tones of the sea and the scent of the saltwater can be sensed with rare immediacy. … One can speak of Walton in many ways as an 'English Impressionist' with a unique ability to express his magic in the voices of the orchestra and the solo instrument".

== Recordings ==
Piatigorsky predicted that the concerto would be taken up by cellists from round the world, and among those who have recorded the concerto after him are soloists from France (Pierre Fournier, Paul Tortelier, Gautier Capuçon), China/Australia (Li-Wei Qin), Germany (Daniel Müller-Schott), Hungary (János Starker), the Netherlands (Pieter Wispelwey), Switzerland (Christian Poltéra), and the US (Lynn Harrell, Mark Kosower, Yo-Yo Ma), as well as British cellists, including Robert Cohen, Steven Isserlis, Ralph Kirshbaum, Julian Lloyd Webber, Raphael Wallfisch and Paul Watkins.

A 2009 recording by the cellist Jamie Walton and the Philharmonia Orchestra conducted by Alexander Briger was the first to use the revised 1974 version of the finale (adding the original as a separate bonus track). The 2014 recording by Li-Wei Qin followed in using the 1974 revision.

In 2015 BBC Radio 3's regular "Building a Library" comparative review considered all the available recordings of the work. The reviewer found that the recordings by Piatigorsky and Fournier were "essential reference"; considered Wispelwey's had the most imaginative and satisfying solo playing, let down by the orchestral accompaniment; and praised Yo-Yo Ma's lyricism. The top all-round recommendation was the Chandos set, by Paul Watkins and the BBC Symphony Orchestra, conducted by Edward Gardner.

== Notes, references and sources ==
=== Sources ===
- Howes, Frank (1965). The Music of William Walton. Oxford: Oxford University Press. ISBN 978-0-19-315412-4.
- Kennedy, Michael (1989). Portrait of Walton. Oxford: Oxford University Press. ISBN 978-0-19-816705-1.
- Lloyd, Stephen (2001). William Walton: Muse of Fire. Woodbridge: Boydell Press. ISBN 978-0-85115-803-7.
- Newton, Ivor (1966). At the Piano. London: Hamish Hamilton. OCLC 941036910.
