= Phantasia (album) =

Studio album by Julian Lloyd Webber and Sarah Chang
- Released: 2005
- Genre: classical
- Length: 60:54
- Label: EMI

Professional ratings
Review scores
Source	Rating
Allmusic	(unfavorable)

Phantasia is a studio album by Julian Lloyd Webber and Sarah Chang released in 2005 by the EMI label. It was produced by Andrew Lloyd Webber and John Fraser.

== Track listing ==
1. Phantasia - Arranged by Geoffrey Alexander, based on melodies from Andrew Lloyd Webber's The Phantom of the Opera
2. The Woman in White Suite - Arranged by Laurence Roman

== Artists ==
- Julian Lloyd Webber, Cello
- Sarah Chang, Violin
- The London Orchestra conducted by Simon Lee
