= Cello Song =

Studio album by Julian Lloyd Webber
- Released: 1993
- Label: Philips Records

Julian Lloyd Webber Collections chronology
Encore! – Travels with My Cello Volume 2 (1986)	Cello Song (1993)	English Idyll (1994)

Cello Song is an album recorded by the cellist Julian Lloyd Webber in 1993 for Philips.

== Track listing ==
1. Song of the Black Swan by Heitor Villa-Lobos (Filmed Performance)
2. Cantata BWV 156 Adagio by J.S. Bach (Filmed Performance)
3. Sea Murmurs by Mario Castelnuovo Tedesco
4. 5 Stücke im Volkston, Op. 102 No. 2 Langsam by Robert Schumann
5. Etude, Op.8 No.11 by Alexander Scriabin
6. Romance in F minor by Serge Rachmaninoff
7. An den Frühling by Edvard Grieg
8. Serenade by Frederick Delius
9. Romance. Op.62 by Edward Elgar
10. Cello Sonata in G minor, Op. 65 Largo by Frédéric Chopin
11. Wie Melodien zieht es mir, Op. 105 No. 1, by Johannes Brahms
12. Songs My Mother Taught Me Op.55 No.4 by Antonín Dvořák
13. Star of the County Down Traditional
14. Beau soir by Claude Debussy
15. Louange à l'éternité de Jésus by Olivier Messiaen

== Personnel ==
- Julian Lloyd Webber, Cello
- John Lenehan, Piano
