= Jackie's Song =

"Jackie's Song" is a composition by Julian Lloyd Webber for cello and string orchestra or cello and piano, composed in 1998 in protest at the film Hilary and Jackie which was based on conversations with Jacqueline du Pré's sister Hilary du Pré and their brother Piers, or possibly on their book A Genius in the Family. It was first performed in January 1999 at Wigmore Hall.

In a letter to The Times on 20 January 1999, co-signed by Yehudi Menuhin, Itzhak Perlman, William Pleeth, Mstislav Rostropovich and Pinchas Zukerman, Lloyd Webber wrote: "Hillary and Jackie ... concentrates heavily on an affair which Jacqueline had with her sister's husband and portrays her as selfish, spoilt and manipulative. This is not the Jacqueline du Pré that we, as her friends and colleagues, knew. Jacqueline possessed a wonderful joy in making music, and a unique ability to bring joy to her audience. This is the Jacqueline du Pré that we remember."

"Jackie's Song" is included on Lloyd Webber's 1998 album Cello Moods and violinist Esther Abrami's debut album for Sony Music titled Esther.
