= Song of the Birds (book) =

Song of the Birds. Sayings, stories and impressions of Pablo Casals.
- First edition cover
- Author: Julian Lloyd Webber
- Language: English
- Subject: Essays, Sayings
- Genre: Non-fiction
- Publisher: Robson Books
- Publication date: June 1985
- Publication place: United Kingdom
- Media type: Print (Hardback)
- Pages: 120 pp (first edition, hardback)
- ISBN: 0-86051-305-X (first edition, hardback)
- OCLC: 13121669
- Dewey Decimal: 780 19
- LC Class: ML418.C4 S55 1985

Song of the Birds is a 1985 collection of sayings, stories, and impressions of the Catalan cellist Pablo Casals. It is edited by British cellist Julian Lloyd Webber. The title refers to El cant dels ocells, a traditional Catalan song which was frequently played by Casals.
