= In Harmony (music education project) =

British social and music education programme based on El Sistema

In Harmony is a British government-led social and music education programme based on El Sistema, adapted to an English context. In Harmony uses music to bring positive change to the lives of children in disadvantaged areas of England, delivering benefits across the wider community. The programme encourages participation in music – in the form of the symphony orchestra – which can have huge personal benefits for the children involved, providing opportunities to grow and develop academically, socially and musically.

== History ==
In Harmony began in 2009 and is a British-government-led music education and community development project based on Venezuela's El Sistema.

British cellist Julian Lloyd Webber is the founder of In Harmony and was the Chairman of the In Harmony steering group, which was initially responsible for guiding the three pilot project in Liverpool (West Everton), London (Lambeth) and Norwich.

=== Funding ===
The project receives funding from the Department for Education and Arts Council England. On 22 November 2007, Julian Lloyd Webber noted the following in regard to the UK government's announcement of an infusion of £332 million dedicated to music education: "We also have an impoverished South American nation to thank. Last August, in the midst of school holidays, when an uncomfortable number of British children seemed even more disaffected than usual, the Simon Bolivar Youth Orchestra arrived from Venezuela to deliver performances at the Edinburgh Festival and the London Proms that were, quite simply, miraculous"

Lloyd Webber visited Venezuela in late 2009 and reported on what he saw there. The project has centers in Lambeth (led by Lambeth Council's Children and Young People's Service), Leeds, (led by Opera North), Liverpool (led by the Royal Liverpool Philharmonic Orchestra), Newcastle Gateshead, (led by The Sage Gateshead), Nottingham, (led by Nottingham City Council), Norwich, (led by NORCA and Sistema in Norwich, and Telford and Stoke-on-Trent (led by Telford and Wrekin Music).

The UK-government-commissioned Henley Review of Music Education (2011) reported that "there is no doubt that they (the In Harmony projects) have delivered life-changing experiences". Independent evaluations published in 2011 reported that the programme has a significant impact on educational attainment and community cohesion.

In July 2011, José Antonio Abreu, the founder of El Sistema in Venezuela, recognised In Harmony as part of the El Sistema worldwide network. In November 2011, the British government announced it would expand In Harmony across England by extending funding from the Department for Education and adding funding from Arts Council England. In May 2012, Arts Council England announced funding for four new In Harmony projects from 2012 to 2015. In July, Arts Council England said that the new projects would be delivered in Newcastle, Leeds, Nottingham and Telford & Wrekin, and that funding would also continue for In Harmony Lambeth and In Harmony Liverpool. Activities in Norwich continued as part of the independently funded Sistema in Norwich programme.

=== Partnership ===
In 2013, In Harmony announced a partnership with El Sistema of Venezuela, which was intended to result in children from both England and Venezuela working together in a series of music-making projects.
