= Lucien Durosoir =

French composer and violinist

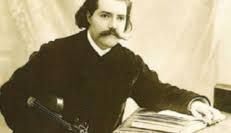

Lucien Durosoir (1878 – 5 December 1955) was a French composer and violinist whose works were rediscovered thanks to manuscripts found by his son Luc. Durosoir studied the violin with Joseph Joachim and Hugo Heermann in Germany before his first tour as a young virtuoso in 1899. In addition to giving the first performances of French music in Austria-Hungary and Germany (Saint-Saëns, Fauré, Lalo, Widor, Bruneau), he also gave the French premiere of the Strauss violin concerto in 1901. His career as a violinist was cut short by World War I. Durosoir served in the Fifth Division, which took part in some of the bloodiest battles of the war (Douaumont, the Chemin des Dames, and Eparges). At the encouragement of General Mangin, Durosoir formed a string quartet with his fellow soldiers Henri Lemoine (second violin), André Caplet (viola), and Maurice Maréchal (cello).

After his demobilization in February, 1919, he began to compose at his home in southwest France. For the next thirty years he composed a host of works, including three string quartets, (1920, 1922 and 1933–34) a large piano sonata (Le Lys, 1921), a piano quintet (1925), an orchestral suite (Funérailles, 1930), and about twenty-five works of chamber music for various instrumental combinations. Isolated from Parisian musical trends, Durosoir forged a very personal style in the Romantic tradition, but with unusual features such as polyrhythms. In 1922 André Caplet wrote, "I will talk with enthusiasm to all my friends about your quartet, which I find a thousand times more interesting than anything with which the noisy group of newcomers overwhelms us." From 1950 onwards illness prevented him from continuing to compose and he died in December 1955.

== Concert violinist ==
At the age of 14, Lucien Durosoir enrolled in Conservatoire Supérieur de Paris, where he studied with Henri Berthelier; however, after several months he was expelled for insolence toward its director, Ambroise Thomas. Durosoir continued his violin studies privately with Berthelier while at the same time learning composition with Charles Tournemire. In 1898, Edouard Colonne engaged him as first chair violinist for his Orchestra of the Concerts Colonne. He went to Germany, where he perfected his technique and interpretive skill under the violinists Joseph Joachim and Hugo Heermann. Starting in 1900, he undertook concert tours extending to central Europe, Russia, Germany, and the Austro-Hungarian Empire. There he played, for the first time, the violin repertory of contemporary French composers such as Saint-Saëns, Lalo, Widor and Bruneau, and in Vienna in 1910, he premiered the Sonata in A Major for Violin and Piano by Gabriel Fauré. While on tour in France he premiered modern German and Danish masterpieces:

- Niels Gade's Violin Concerto in D Minor, Op. 56 at the Salle Pleyel in 1899
- Richard Strauss's Violin Concerto in D Minor, Op.8

His performances were all met with favorable reviews:

- "captivates the public by the loftiness and spirit of his playing" (Neue Freie Press, 11 January 1910)
- "all of these pieces were performed with the same nobility and beauty of execution"' (Wiener Mittags-Zeitung, 28 January 1910)
- "He displayed, in the concerto of Max Bruch, the rarest qualities of sonority and musicality, and in the Dvořák concerto an astonishing style and virtuosity... Monsieur Lucien Durosoir, in this lovely performance, ranks among the foremost virtuosos of his time." (Le Figaro, 19 May 1904)

[reference: Les Archives biographiques contemporaines (Paris, sd. [vers 1911]), p. 219-220. Posters and concert programs from the Durosoir family archives, Bélus, France]

== Military service in World War I ==
November 1903 concert program at the Berlin Sing-Akademie.

When World War I broke out, Durosoir was 36. After a year fighting in the trenches, he became a stretcher-bearer and awaited nightfall before venturing out to collect the wounded. Durosoir came to the attention of General Mangin, a great music lover, who recruited him, along with the composer André Caplet and the young cellist Maurice Maréchal, to form a chamber music ensemble. The trio played for funeral services, for guests (such as visiting English officers and, more rarely, civilians) in the general's quarters, and in the barracks for the soldiers’ entertainment. Their concerts featured all kinds of arrangements of orchestral works for piano and solo instruments. During this time the duties of Durosoir and Caplet also included caring for the carrier pigeons.

The three spent these terrible years together, and their friendship was sealed in the trenches as well as in their music-making. The inspiration to compose increasingly seized Durosoir's imagination. He acquired scores and studied the style of Brahms, Beethoven, Haydn, and others. In 1915 Emma Debussy sent him Claude Debussy's Études. Durosoir and Caplet were examining these when six bombs fell around their building. Thinking ahead to the end of the war, Durosoir wrote on 12 September 1916, "I begin to compose so as to become accustomed to managing the freer forms, and my efforts, I am convinced, will be fruitful." During the periods of repose from his duties in the trenches, he continued his study of counterpoint and fugue with exercises "corrected" by André Caplet.

[reference: Deux musiciens dans la Grande Guerre (Paris, Tallandier-Radio France, 2005; Mangin (Général), Lettres de guerre, 1914-1918 (Paris, Fayard, 1950)]

== Composer ==
Durosoir returned to civilian life in February 1919. In 1921, the Boston Symphony Orchestra offered him the position of first chair violin. He accepted, and was on the point of leaving when an accident prevented his departure, and he had to give up his career as a violinist. From then until his death, he lived in retirement far from Paris and its artistic circles. On the basis of his academic work, reinforced by his personal study of scores and compositional exercises, he began composing, and crafted an individual and bold musical style independent from the mainstream. His works display neither perceptible influences nor overtly stated references. Nearly all of his works are headed by a quotation of contemporary poetry, or by a prose quotation of a philosophical nature.

André Caplet wrote to him in 1922: "I will speak with enthusiasm to all my associates of your quartet, which find many times more interesting than all the products with which the group of flashy newcomers overwhelm us." Lucien Durosoir composed around forty unpublished works, including pieces for varied ensembles, symphonic works and chamber music: string quartets, sonatas, trios, short piano works, numerous pieces for piano and solo instruments. After 1950, illness prevented him from composing, and he died in December 1955.

== Works ==
Thanks to his son Luc Durosoir and Luc's wife Georgie, a renowned musicology professor at the Sorbonne, Durosoir's works have been published and the MEGEP chamber music competition was founded to encourage the revival of the genre. A book of Durosoir's letters has been published to much acclaim in France, and interest in the music is increasing amongst musicologists, performers and pedagogues.

As a result of his intentional isolation from the Parisian musical trends of the time, Durosoir's compositions have a unique character. While not outwardly programmatic, they are often preceded by some verses of poetry which serve as a threshold into his highly personal world of expression. His style is a lean and spare one that is marked by solid construction, sudden contrasts and avoidance of gratuitous ornament. Tonal with a harmonic palette enriched by non-chord tones and altered scales, the music shows a strong need for resolution that occasionally veers off toward regions of atonality. Similarly, the constraints imposed by regular meter are cast off by means of frequent metric changes and tempo alterations. Durosoir shows great imagination in the area of musical texture and the use of extended performance techniques (con sordino, sul ponticello, col legno, ricochet, harmonics), and consequently expressive indications are encountered in each melodic line. In short, the music of Lucien Durosoir avoids categorization with many of the "ism" labels (i.e.: impressionism, neoclassicism) that are commonly applied to music of the early twentieth century.

=== Orchestral works ===
- Poème for violin and viola with orchestra, 1920
- Déjanira, symphonic étude based on a fragment from Trakhiniennes by Sophocles, 1923
- Le balcon, poème symphonique for bass solo, chorus, and strings, 1924
- Funérailles, suite for orchestra, 1930
- Suite for flute and chamber orchestra, 1931

=== Chamber works ===
- Cinq aquarelles for violin and piano (Bretagne, Vision, Ronde *, Berceuse *, Intermède), 1920; these two movements are also transcribed for violoncello and piano
- Poème transcribed for violin solo, viola solo, and piano
- String Quartet No. 1 in F Minor, 1920
- Caprice for violoncello and harp, 1921
- Jouvence, fantasy for principal violin and string octet, 1921; this work is also transcribed for violin and piano
- Le Lys, sonata in A Minor for violin and piano, 1921
- String Quartet No. 2 in D Minor, 1922
- Rêve for violin and piano, 1925
- Quintet in F Major for piano and string quartet, 1925
- Idylle for wind quartet : flute, clarinet, horn in F, bassoon, 1925
- Oisillon bleu, brief poème for violin and piano, 1927
- Trio en Si mineur for violin, violoncello, and piano, 1927
- Divertissement, Maiade et Improvisation, 3 pieces for violoncello and piano, 1931
- String Quartet No. 3 in B Minor [1933-1934]
- Vitrail, piece for viola and piano, 1934
- Berceuse for flute and piano, 1934
- Au vent des Landes for flute and piano, 1935
- Fantaisie for horn, harp and piano, 1937
- Incantation bouddhique for English horn and piano, 1946
- Prière à Marie for violin and piano, 1949
- Chant élégiaque in memory of Ginette Neveu, for violin and piano, 1950
- Improvisation sur la gamme d’ut for melodic instrument and piano, 1950

=== Vocal ===
- Sonnet à un enfant for voice and piano, 1930
- A ma mère, for voice and piano (unfinished), 1950

=== Piano ===
- Légende, 1923
- Aube, Sonate d’été, 1926
- Nocturne pour piano, 1950

=== Two pianos ===
- Prélude, Interlude Fantaisie pour deux pianos, 1932

=== Harmonium and organ ===
- Trois préludes (two harmonium, one for organ), 1945
