= Jiaxin Cheng =

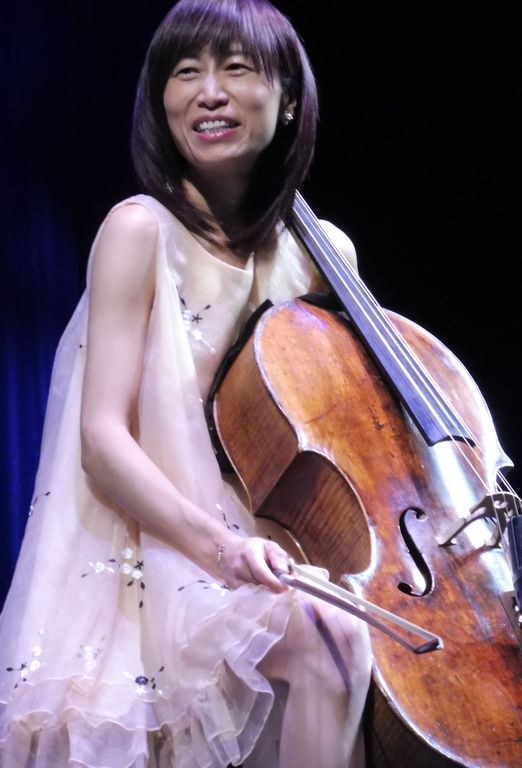
- Jiaxin Cheng in 2018

Background information
- Born: 2 October 1974 (age 51)
- Origin: China
- Genres: Classical music
- Occupation: Cellist
- Instrument: Cello
- Spouse: Julian Lloyd Webber

Jiaxin Cheng (Chinese: 程嘉欣, born 2 October 1974) is a Chinese cellist.

== Career ==
Cheng graduated from the Shanghai Conservatory of Music, China, in 1997. She was already giving performances with the Shanghai Symphony Orchestra but left China for further studies in New Zealand, where she received her master's degree at the University of Auckland in 2001.

While in New Zealand, Cheng was principal cello of the Auckland Chamber Orchestra and played regularly with both the Auckland Philharmonia Orchestra and the New Zealand Symphony Orchestra. With the Auckland Symphony Orchestra she performed cello concertos by Dvořák, Elgar and Lalo. Cheng was also a founding member of the Aroha String Quartet.

Since 2007, Cheng has lived in London where she has given several recitals. Her performance in April 2008 at Her Majesty's Theatre with both Andrew and Julian Lloyd Webber was described as "the emotional highlight of the evening". She appeared as a soloist at the Royal Festival Hall in April 2011 and with Julian Lloyd Webber for BBC Radio 3, Classic FM, CNN Global TV and BBC Television. They have recorded for Universal Classics and Naxos and they made further recordings in 2013 as well as touring together with the European Union Chamber Orchestra and English Chamber Orchestra.

Cheng married Julian Lloyd Webber in July 2009 (the couple's daughter was born on 14 June 2011). Their first recording together, released in March 2011, was Menotti's Arioso for two cellos and strings, featured on the album The Art of Julian Lloyd Webber. Cheng also features on Lloyd Webber's 2011 album Evening Songs. In September 2013, Naxos released their first full-length recording A Tale of Two Cellos. This was followed by the Vivaldi concertos for two cellos with the European Union Chamber Orchestra in 2014.
