= Concierto como un divertimento =

Rodrigo Cello Concerto - Concierto como un divertimento

Studio album by Julian Lloyd Webber
- Released: 1982
- Label: RCA Records

Joaquín Rodrigo's Concierto como un divertimento, for cello and orchestra received its first performance at the Royal Festival Hall, London, on April 15, 1982. The performers were the British cellist Julian Lloyd Webber, who had commissioned the concerto, and the London Philharmonic Orchestra conducted by Jesús López-Cobos. Lloyd Webber had approached the Spanish composer, who was by then nearly eighty, with the idea of him writing a new work for cello and orchestra in 1979. Concierto como un divertimento is lightly scored but with the added colours of xylophone and celesta.

It is cast in three movements:

1. Allegretto
2. Adagio nostalgico
3. Allegro scherzando

The work was well received at its premiere when the final movement had to be encored. The concerto and its creation was the subject of a South Bank Show television programme which included the complete first performance. The concerto was subsequently recorded for RCA Red Seal with the same performers.
