= Cello Moods =

Studio album by Julian Lloyd Webber
- Released: 1998
- Recorded: 1998
- Genre: Classical
- Label: Philips Records

Collections chronology
Cradle Song (1993)	Cello Moods (1998)	Elegy (1998)

Cello Moods is an album recorded by the British cellist Julian Lloyd Webber and, principally, the Royal Philharmonic Orchestra under James Judd in 1998 for Philips. It is a collection of classical pieces either originally written for or adapted for the cello and orchestral accompaniment. The CD combines such familiar pieces as César Franck's "Panis angelicus" with rarities such as Glazunov's "Melodie".

== Track listing ==
1. "Panis angelicus" by César Franck
2. "Chanson de Matin" by Edward Elgar
3. "Salut d'Amour" by Edward Elgar
4. "Jackie's Song" by Julian Lloyd Webber – BBC Concert Orchestra, Barry Wordsworth conducting
5. "Reverie" by Claude Debussy
6. "Air on the G String" by J. S. Bach
7. "Meditation from Thaïs by Jules Massenet
8. "Sakura Sakura", traditional, arranged by Jason Kouchak
9. "Ave Maria" by Vladimir Vavilov (misattributed to Giulio Caccini)
10. "Nocturne" by Alexander Borodin
11. "Melodie", Op. 20, No. 1, by Alexander Glazunov
12. "Nocturne" by Frédéric Chopin
13. "Adagio from Cello Concerto in B-flat" by Luigi Boccherini
14. "Cantilena from Organ Sonata No. 11" by Josef Rheinberger
15. Kol Nidrei by Max Bruch
