= Serge Barjansky =

Dr. Serge Barjansky
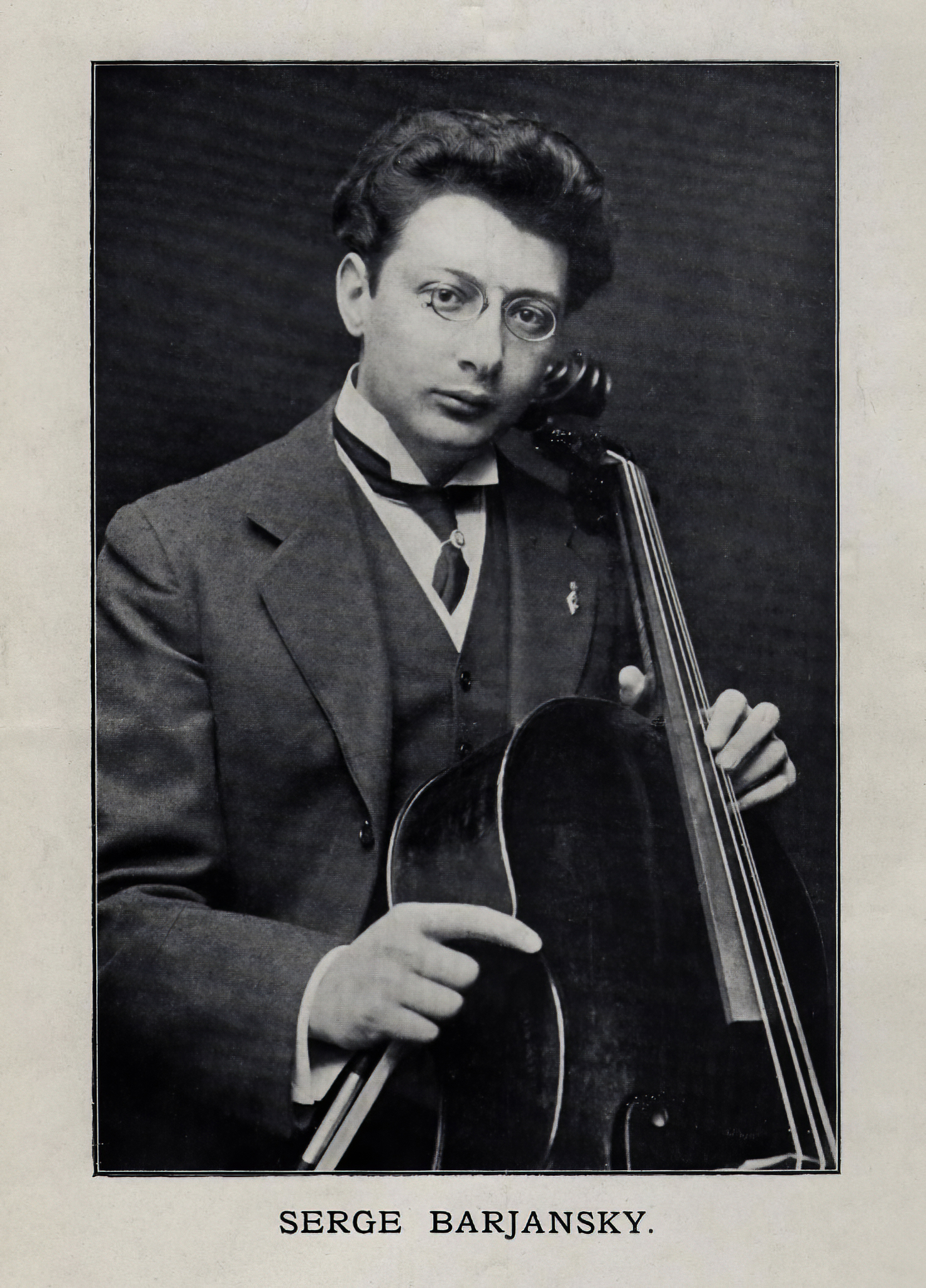

Background information
- Born: Serge Barjansky; 1 May 1883; Odessa, Russian Empire
- Died: 29 May 1940 Wilkinsburg, Pennsylvania, United States
- Genres: classical
- Occupation: cellist
- Instrument: cello

Sergey Adolfovich Barjansky (Russian: Сергей Адольфович Баржанский) (1 May [O.S. 19 April] 1883 Odessa, Russian Empire – 29 May 1940 Wilkinsburg, Pennsylvania) was a Russian virtuoso cellist. Barjansky's cello was a Stradivarius instrument which became known as the Barjansky Stradivarius. This instrument is now played by Julian Lloyd Webber.

== Life ==
Sergey was born in Odessa, in a wealthy Russian-Jewish family, the son of first guild merchant, composer, and pianist Adolf Barjansky (c. 1850 – 1900 Odessa, Russian Empire) and Maria Clara Weisstein (1861 Tarnopol, Galicia (Eastern Europe), Austria-Hungary – 1927 Vienne, Austria). Serge's father, who studied piano and composition with Ignaz Amadeus Tedesco, Carl Reinecke, and Salomon Jadassohn, was a composer of classical music for solo piano and chamber music ensembles in the Romantic tradition.

While following his doctorate in mathematics from the Imperial Novorossiya University in his home town, Serge studied the cello at the Royal Conservatory of Music of Leipzig with Julius Klengel (1859-1933), famous cellist of the Leipzig Gewandhaus Orchestra. Serge's debut was on 17 February 1906 in Leipzig, performing the concertos for cello by Karl Davydov and Édouard Lalo. He first appeared in London on 28 June 1909 at the St. James's Hall. In 1911 he performed three concertos in one evening with the London Symphony Orchestra and in the 1912-13 season he played the Dvořak Concerto at The Queen’s Hall London with the London Symphony Orchestra conducted by Sir Edward Elgar. In the following years, he performed as a soloist with the most important orchestras and conductors in Europe, including the Berlin Philharmonic Orchestra, the Königliche musikalische Kapelle (Royal Chapel) in Dresden, the London Symphony Orchestra, and the Concertgebouw in Amsterdam.

In 1914 Serge married an Odessa native Elizabeth Trahtenhertz in Paris. Their son Adolf was born there the following year and daughter Jeanne was born in Odessa in 1918.

Following the Russian Revolution, the family moved to Istanbul, Turkey, where Elizabeth died in 1934. In 1922 he sold the Stradivarius, which he owned since 1909. He later wrote about this period "The war, the Russian revolution, twenty years of life lost in Turkey where musical activity was impossible, and where one had to struggle to obtain the means of bare existence, all combined to retard my work."

In 1936 Serge and his children moved to the United States. He joined the Pittsburg Symphony's cello section in the 1937-1938 season under Fritz Reiner. Dr. Barjansky conducted a cello master class in August 1938 at The Pittsburgh Musical Institute, which merged in 1963 with the University of Pittsburgh In 1939 Barjansky published "The Physical Basis of Tone Production for String Instrument Players", which was republished 2 years later by Volkwein Bros., Inc.

Dr. Serge Barjansky Berlin concert advertisement

== Family ==
Serge Barjansky was one of the 6 siblings: Dr. Mikhail Barjansky (1880–1932), Malvina Karassik (1882-1967), Melitta Barjansky (1884-1959), Elizabeth Barjansky (1886-?), Alexey Barjansky (1892-1948).

- Adolf Barjansky (1851—1900) — Serge's father, composer and pianist
- Dr. Mikhail Barjansky (1880—1932) — Serge's brother, pianist and composer. Professor at Conservatoire Serge Rachmaninoff de Paris.
- Igor Karassik (1911-1995) — Serge's nephew, Russian-American engineer.
- Vladimir Barjansky (1892-1968) — Serge's cousin, painter, graphic artist.
- Alexandre Barjansky (1883–1961) — Serge's 2nd cousin, virtuoso cellist, was married to sculptor Catherine Barjansky (née Constantinovsky) (1890-1965).
