= Cello Concerto (Honegger) =

Cello concerto by Arthur Honegger

- by Arthur Honegger
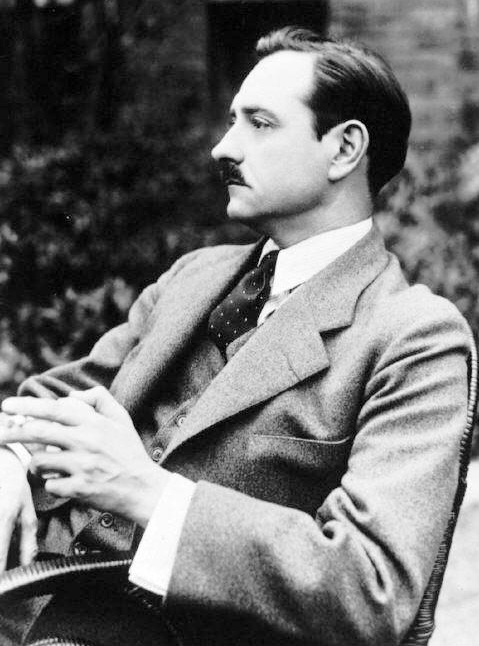
- Cellist Maréchal in Tokyo
- Key: C major
- Catalogue: H. 72
- Year: 1929
- Dedication: Maurice Maréchal
- Published: 1931 - Paris
- Publisher: Éditions Maurice Senart
- Duration: 17 minutes
- Movements: 1

Premiere
- Date: 17 February 1930
- Location: Boston, Massachusetts, United States
- Conductor: Serge Koussevitzky
- Performers: Maurice Maréchal; Boston Symphony Orchestra

Arthur Honegger's Cello Concerto in C major, H. 72, is the composer's only cello concerto. It was composed in 1929 and premiered in Boston the next year with the soloist Maurice Maréchal to whom it is dedicated.

== Background ==
The Cello Concerto is one of Honegger's three concertante works, and the only one without a diminutive in its title. Composed in 1929, it was finished after Honegger had become a member of Les Six, a group of composers that advocated a return to French music-hall traditions and departed from Wagnerian influence. The work was premiered by cellist Maurice Maréchal, who was also the dedicatee. The premiere took place in Boston with Maréchal as the soloist and Serge Koussevitzky conducting the Boston Symphony Orchestra, on 17 February 1930. This was not Honegger's first premiere on American territory, as he had premiered Pacific 231 in Boston during the 1924-25 season with Koussevitzky, a noted champion of contemporary music. It was published a year later, in 1931, by Éditions Maurice Senart, and is nowadays published by Francis Salabert. The original cadenza written by Maréchal was also published in 1931 as a separate item.

== Structure ==
The concerto is in one movement. It is scored for solo cello and an orchestra made up of two flutes, two oboes, two clarinets, two bassoons, two French horns, two trumpets, a tuba, timpani, percussion, and a standard string section. It is structured into three distinct sections, which were considered to be distinct attacca movements at the time of the premiere: an introductory "andantino" section, a slow section marked "lento" and followed by an ad libitum cadenza by the solo cello, and a quick-paced "allegro marcato" section that closes the piece.

== Recordings ==
Reviewing a 2007 recording by cellist Christian Poltéra with the Malmö Symphony Orchestra, conducted by Tuomas Hannikainen, which combined the work with the composer's Cello Sonata and two Sonatinas, Guy Rickards from Gramophone noted that recordings of the Cello Concerto are rather rare, but Rostropovich had already recorded it twice by then. The following is a list of recordings of Honegger's Cello Concerto.

Recordings of Honegger's Cello Concerto
Cello	Conductor	Orchestra	Date of recording	Place of recording	Label
Maurice Maréchal	Arthur Honegger	Orchestre de la Société des Concerts du Conservatoire	January 1931	—	EMI Classics
Christian Poltéra	Tuomas Hannikainen	Malmö Symphony Orchestra	June 2007	Malmö Concert Hall, Sweden	BIS Records
Johannes Moser	Christoph Poppen	Deutsche Radio Philharmonie Saarbrücken Kaiserslautern	June 2010	SWR Studio, Kaiserslautern, Germany	SWR Classic
Daniel Müller-Schott	Alexandre Bloch	Deutsches Symphonie-Orchester Berlin	August 2019	Jesus-Christus-Kirche, Germany	Orfeo
