= Alexandre Barjansky =

- A rare picture of Barjansky

Background information
- Born: Alexandre Barjansky
- Genres: classical
- Occupation: cellist
- Instrument: cello

Alexandre Mikhaylovich Barjansky (Russian: Александр Михайлович Баржанский) (17 Dec [O.S. 5 Dec] 1883 Odessa, Russian Empire – 1961 Brussels, Belgium) was a Russian virtuoso cellist.

== Life ==
He was born in Odessa, a distant cousin of Adolf Barjansky (c. 1850 – 1900 Odessa, Russian Empire), a composer of classical music for solo piano and chamber music ensembles in the Romantic tradition, and his son, also a virtuoso cellist, Serge Barjansky.

Among his early concert appearances were the Lalo Concerto with the Wiener Konzertverein on 4 March 1910 and in 1911 a recital with the pianist Artur Schnabel in Prague.

Barjansky was the dedicatee of Ernest Bloch's Schelomo and gave the first performance of the Cello Concerto by Frederick Delius in Vienna in 1923. Barjansky married the sculpturess Catherine Barjansky in 1915 in Lausanne. They separated in 1940. There is much biographical material concerning the Barjanskys in her autobiography ‘Portraits with Backgrounds’ (London/Geoffrey Bles 1948). Barjansky often played chamber music with Albert Einstein and with Elisabeth of Bavaria, Queen of Belgium, both of whom were friends of Catherine Barjansky, the latter being her pupil.

In Delius As I Knew Him, Eric Fenby writes of Barjansky: "I was not prepared to find so unusual-looking a man. He was of medium height, pale and thin, but he had a striking head, with high forehead and a mass of long bushy hair. I perceived him to be an extremely likable fellow, and one of those rare musicians who give the impression of being musical." And Jelka Delius wrote: "He looks extraordinary when he plays, so ecstatic with a delicate, sensitive face and hair like an Italian primitive."
