= Travels with My Cello (album) =

Studio album by Julian Lloyd Webber
- Released: 1984
- Label: Philips

Julian Lloyd Webber Collections chronology
Travels with My Cello (1984)	Encore! - Travels with My Cello Volume 2 (1986)

An autobiography of the same name, Travels with My Cello, was published in 1984.

== Track listing ==
1. "Flight of the Bumble-bee" by Rimsky-Korsakov Filmed Performance
2. "Vilja-Lied" by Lehár
3. "Golliwogg's Cake-Walk" by Debussy
4. "Traumerei" by Schumann
5. "Puerta de Tierra" by Albeniz
6. "Le Cygne" by Saint-Saëns Filmed Performance
7. "Ave Maria" by J.S. Bach Filmed Performance
8. "Andante Affettuoso" by William Lloyd Webber
9. "Pizzicato Polka" by Josef Strauss
10. "Adagio in G Minor" by Albinoni/Giazotto
11. "Irish Tune from County Derry" by Grainger
12. "Sabre Dance" by Khatchaturian

== Personnel ==
- Julian Lloyd Webber
- English Chamber Orchestra
- Nicholas Cleobury

== Encore! – Travels with My Cello Volume 2 ==
Encore! – Travels with My Cello Volume 2

Studio album by Julian Lloyd Webber
- Released: 1986
- Label: Philips

Julian Lloyd Webber Collections chronology
Travels with My Cello (1984)	Encore! – Travels with My Cello Volume 2 (1986)	Cello Song (1993)

Encore! – Travels with My Cello Volume 2 was released in 1986.

=== Track listing ===
1. "Bess, You is My Woman Now" by Gershwin
2. "Nocturne" by Taube
3. "Rondo alla Turca" by Mozart
4. "Claire de Lune" by Debussy
5. "Skye Boat Song" by Traditional
6. "Habanera" by Bizet
7. "Un Apres-midi" by Vangelis
8. "Song of the Seashore" by Narita
9. "When I'm Sixty-Four" by Lennon–McCartney
10. "Somewhere" by Bernstein
11. "Jesu. Joy of Man's Desiring" by Bach
12. "Chant Hindou" by Rimsky-Korsakov
13. "You are My Heart's Delight" by Lehár

=== Personnel ===
- Julian Lloyd Webber
- Royal Philharmonic Orchestra
- Nicholas Cleobury
