= Chanson de Nuit =

Musical composition by Edward Elgar

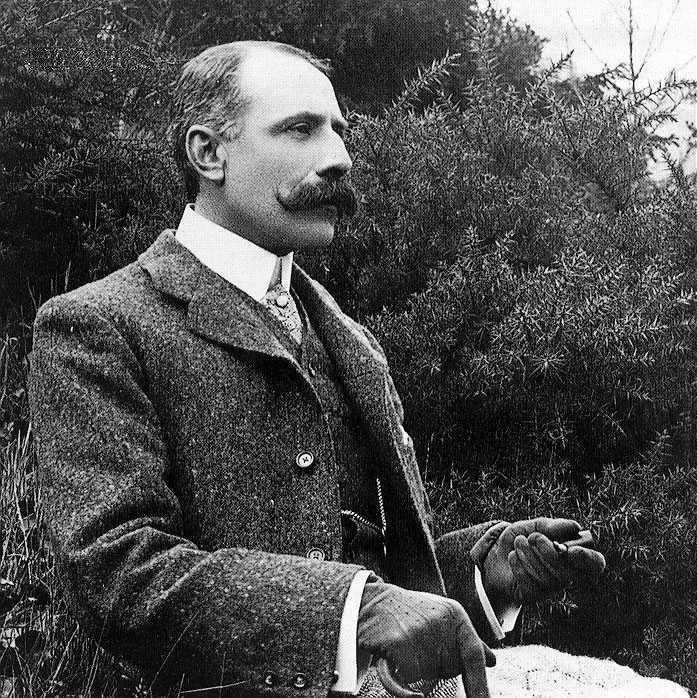
Edward Elgar, c. 1900

Chanson de Nuit, Op. 15, No. 1, is a musical work composed by Edward Elgar for violin and piano, and later orchestrated by the composer. Its first publication was in 1897, though it is considered that it was almost certainly written in 1889 or 1890.

It has invited comparison with, and has been said to be a finer work than its more popular "companion" piece, Chanson de Matin, Op. 15, No. 2.

The orchestral version of the work was published in 1899, and first performed, together with Chanson de Matin, at a Queen's Hall Promenade Concert conducted by Henry Wood on 14 September 1901.

The work was dedicated to F. Ehrke, M.D.

== Structure ==
Andante, 4/4, G major

A performance will take around three and a half minutes.

== Instrumentation ==
Elgar scored Chanson de Nuit (and Chanson de Matin) for a small orchestra consisting of one flute, one oboe, two clarinets, one bassoon, two horns, the string section, and a harp.

== Arrangements ==
The work is most well known in its original form (Violin & Piano) and the composer's orchestral version. Other noteworthy arrangements are for cello and piano, for viola and piano (both by the composer), and for organ by his friend A. Herbert Brewer.

== Notable performances ==
In 1976 Dominique Bagouet had his first great success with his performance of Chanson de Nuit, winning the Concours de Bagnolet.

== Performances on video ==
- Old Bridge Chamber Orchestra (amateur) cond. Gregg Martin - Orchestra
