= Giazotto =

Giazotto is an Italian surname. Notable people with the surname include:

- Adalberto Giazotto (1940–2017), Italian physicist, son of Remo
- Remo Giazotto (1910–1998), Italian musicologist, music critic, and composer
