= A Tale of Two Cellos =

Studio album by Julian Lloyd Webber
- Released: 2013
- Recorded: January 2013
- Genre: Classical
- Label: Naxos Records

A Tale of Two Cellos is a recording of twenty-one duets for two cellos and piano (or harp) ranging from the sixteenth century, Monteverdi, to the twenty-first century, Arvo Pärt. The recording features cellists Julian Lloyd Webber, his wife Jiaxin Cheng, pianist John Lenehan, harpist Catrin Finch, and two former BBC Young Musician of the Year winners Guy Johnston and Laura van der Heijden. It was released by Naxos Records in September 2013.

== Track listing ==
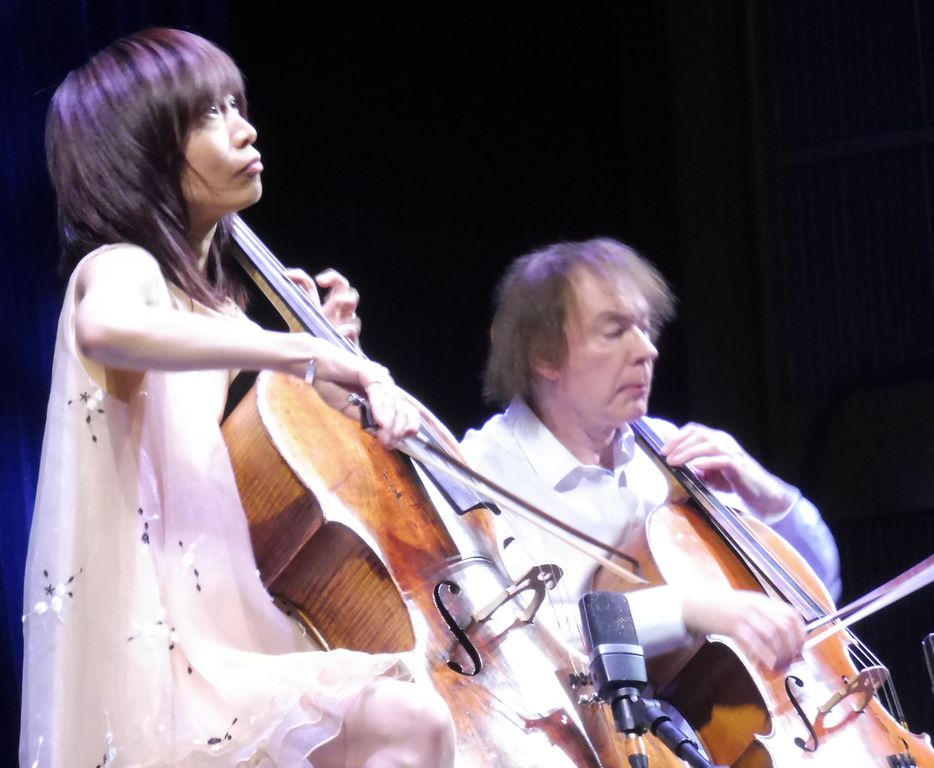
Jiaxin Cheng and Julian Lloyd Webber, 2018

1. Camille Saint-Saëns: Ave Maria
2. Astor Piazzolla: The Little Beggar Boy (Chiquilin de Bachin)
3. Claudio Monteverdi: Interrotte Speranze
4. Dmitri Shostakovich: Prelude from The Gadfly
5. Gustav Holst: Hymn to the Dawn, Op. 26, No. 1 (arr. for four cellos and harp)
6. Roger Quilter: My Lady (Greensleeves)
7. Anton Rubinstein: The Angel, Op. 48, No. 1
8. Antonín Dvořák: The Harvesters, Op. 38, No. 3
9. William Lloyd Webber: Moon Silver
10. Robert Schumann: Summer Calm (Sommerruh)
11. Giovanni Pergolesi: Dolorosa (Stabat Mater)
12. Antonín Dvořák: Autumn Lament, Op. 38, No. 4
13. Reynaldo Hahn: If my songs were only wingèd
14. Sergei Rachmaninoff: The Waves are Dreaming, Op. 15, No. 2
15. Henry Purcell: Lost is my quiet for ever
16. Antonín Dvořák: The Modest Lass, Op. 32, No. 8
17. Robert Schumann: Evening Star (An den Abendstern) Op. 103, No. 4
18. Ethelbert Nevin: O that we two were maying
19. Joseph Barnby: Sweet and Low
20. Roger Quilter: Summer Sunset
21. Arvo Pärt: Estonian Lullaby

== Personnel ==
- Julian Lloyd Webber cello
- Jiaxin Cheng cello
- John Lenehan piano
- Catrin Finch harp
- Guy Johnston cello
- Laura van der Heijden cello
