= Unexpected Songs =

Studio album by Julian Lloyd Webber
- Released: 2006
- Label: EMI

Julian Lloyd Webber Collections chronology
Made in England / Gentle Dreams (2003)	Unexpected Songs (2006)	Romantic Cello Concertos (2009)

Unexpected Songs is a 2006 album by Julian Lloyd Webber.

== Track listing ==
1. "Star of the County Down"/"Lady D'Arbanville" by Cat Stevens/Trad. arr. Chowhan
2. "Oblivion" by Ástor Piazzolla arr. Lenehan
3. "Marble Halls" by Michael Balfe
4. "Prelude in E minor" by Frédéric Chopin
5. "In Haven (Capri)" from Sea Pictures by Edward Elgar
6. "Chant hindou" by Nikolay Rimsky-Korsakov
7. "Trees" by Oscar Rasbach
8. "L'Heure exquise" by Reynaldo Hahn
9. "Kashmiri Love Song" by Amy Woodforde-Finden arr. Lenehan
10. "Koyal" "(Songbird)" by Nitin Sawhney/Saroj Sawhney
11. "Sicilienne" by Gabriel Fauré
12. "Hushabye Mountain" from Chitty Chitty Bang Bang by Richard Sherman arr. Finch
13. "Music when soft voices die" by Roger Quilter
14. "Serenade" by Franz Schubert
15. "The Lea Rig" Traditional Scottish arr. Chowhan
16. "African Crib Carol" Traditional African arr. F. Ray Bennett, Lenehan & J. Lloyd Webber
17. "In trutina" from Carmina Burana by Carl Orff
18. "A Gift of a Thistle" from Braveheart by James Horner arr. Chowhan
19. "To a Wild Rose" by Edward MacDowell
20. "Unexpected Song" (with Michael Ball) from Song and Dance by Andrew Lloyd Webber

== Personnel ==
- Julian Lloyd Webber, Cello
- John Lenehan, Piano
- Pam Chowhan, Piano and Keyboards (Symphony of Pain 2002–present)
- Catrin Finch, Harp
- Michael Ball, vocals
- Steáfán Hannigan, uilleann pipes, flute and whistle
- Pete Lockett, percussion, vocal percussion and sound effects
