= Cello Concerto (Delius) =

Concerto for cello and orchestra by Frederick Delius

Frederick Delius's Cello Concerto was composed in 1920–1921. The world premiere was given in January 1923 in Vienna by Alexandre Barjansky. The work was written at the request of the English cellist Beatrice Harrison, who was the soloist at the British premiere in July 1923.

This was the composer's favourite of his concertos. It was first commercially recorded in 1965 and has received further recordings subsequently.

== Background and first performances ==
After Delius had composed a Cello Sonata for Beatrice Harrison she urged him to write a concerto for her. He began sketching the work in 1920, completing it in May 1921. Although it was written for Harrison, Delius's publishers arranged a prestigious world premiere in Vienna, by the Russian cellist Alexandre Barjansky, with Ferdinand Löwe conducting. Harrison gave the British premiere on 23 July 1923, in a concert at which she also played the Elgar concerto with the composer conducting. Eugene Goossens conducted the Delius. Harrison gave the American premiere on 28 October 1927, with Fritz Reiner conducting the Philadelphia Orchestra.

== Structure ==
The concerto plays without a break, but has five distinct sections:

- Lento – Slow
- Con moto – tranquillo – Becoming Slower
- Lento – Very Quietly
- Con moto tranquillo
- Allegramente – With animation

The work typically plays for between 20 and 25 minutes.

== Critical reception ==
After the British premiere The Observer described the concerto as "beautiful but backboneless … It is from beginning to end nothing but a sort of long one-movement rhapsody". In The Manchester Guardian, Ernest Newman wrote "It is better in detail than as a whole. It abounds in momentary lovelinesses, but long before the end the absence of any sort of climax … induces a sense of monotony".

== Recordings ==
The Delius Trust website lists five commercial recordings of the concerto:

- Jacqueline du Pré, Royal Philharmonic Orchestra, Sir Malcolm Sargent (January 1965)
- Erling Blöndal Bengtsson, Danish Radio Symphony Orchestra, Meredith Davies (March 1976; live recording)
- Julian Lloyd Webber, Philharmonia Orchestra, Vernon Handley (October 1982)
- Raphael Wallfisch, Royal Liverpool Philharmonic Orchestra, Sir Charles Mackerras (June 1991)
- Paul Watkins, BBC Symphony Orchestra, Sir Andrew Davis (October 2010).

== See also ==
- List of compositions by Frederick Delius
