= Maurice Maréchal =

French cellist (1892–1964)

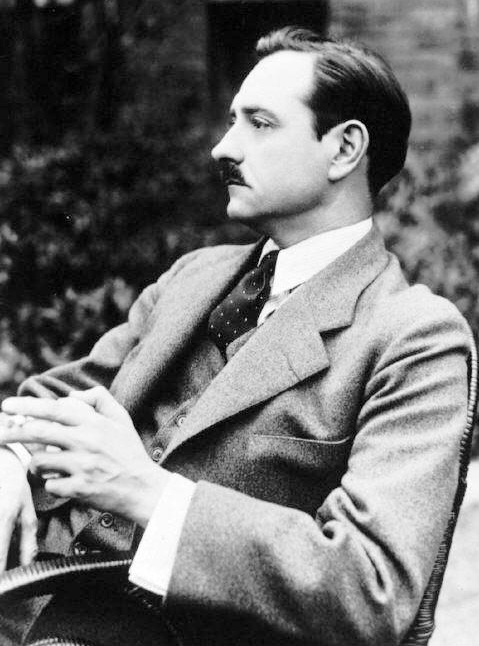
- Maurice Maréchal in Tokyo
- Born: 3 October 1892; Dijon, France
- Died: 19 April 1964 (aged 71); Paris
- Occupations: Cellist; Music educator

Maurice Maréchal (3 October 1892 – 19 April 1964) was a French classical cellist.

Maurice Maréchal was born in Dijon at the home of his parents, Jules Jacques Maréchal, an employee for Posts and Telegraphs, and Martha Justine Morier. After studying at the conservatory in his hometown, in 1905 he entered the Paris Conservatory where he studied with Jules-Leopold Loeb and won his first cello award in 1911 at the age of 19.

== World War I ==
Three years later, France entered World War I, and Maréchal was drafted. He recorded his daily routine from August 1914 to February 1919 in his diaries, and recounted how two carpenter comrades carved him a rudimentary wooden cello from an ammunition box, with which he played for religious services and for officers.

While in the service he met other musicians, including Gustave Cloëz, Lucien Durosoir, André Caplet and Henri Lemoine, and formed with them a small ensemble that performed before the officer staff. Maréchal was awarded the Croix de Guerre in 1916, and was an Officer of the Legion of Honour.

== Musical career ==
After the war, he joined the Concerts Lamoureux in 1919 for one year, and later the New York Orchestra. He then began a solo career. His friend Émile Poillot accompanied him on the piano during tours in Spain (1925 and 1926), France (1928), Singapore (1933) and the Dutch Indies (1933). In 1942 he was appointed professor at the Conservatoire de Paris, a post he left a year before his death in 1964, at the age of 72. Among his pupils were Christine Walevska, Alain Lambert, Jean Moves and Alain Meunier.

He was known for his interpretations of such works as the Sonata for Violin and Cello by Maurice Ravel, in which he was the cellist in the sonata's premiere in 1922, along with violinist Hélène Jourdan-Morhange. He also was known for his interpretations of Épiphanie by André Caplet, and the concertos of Arthur Honegger, Darius Milhaud and Édouard Lalo.

== World War II ==
Maréchal's career was again interrupted by war. When the Germans occupied France in 1940, Maréchal supported the Resistance. He also steadfastly refused all offers to play in Germany, or even on the German-dominated French radio program concerts. After the war when he resumed his career he was stricken with a progressive muscular disease that took the strength from his bowing arm. He gave his last concerts in 1950, and spent the rest of his life teaching and appearing on international juries.

== Personal life ==
Maréchal was married to the former Lois Perkins of Norwich, Connecticut, US, an actress. They met in 1920 in France while Lois worked as a volunteer canteen worker with the American Expeditionary Force. They had a daughter, Denise, and a son.

Maréchal died Sunday, April 19, 1964, at his home in Paris following a kidney operation. His funeral took place in the Cathedral of St. Benignus, Dijon, on April 22. He is buried in the cemetery of Péjoces in Dijon.

== Bibliography ==
Lois Perkins-Maréchal extensively discusses their life and her husband's artistic activity in the book, "L'Amérique avant les gratte-ciel" ("America Before the Skyscrapers"), published by France-Empire in 1979.

Nine of Maréchal's diaries, together with letters of Lucien Durosoir, appeared in 2005 in a book titled "Two Musicians in the Great War," compiled by Duroisoir's son, Luc Durosoir.
