= Two Songs to be sung of a summer night on the water =

- Partsongs by Frederick Delius
- The composer in 1907
- Dedication: Charles Kennedy Scott and the Oriana Madrigal Society
- Performed: 28 June 1921: London
- Scoring: mixed six-part choir

Two Songs to be sung of a summer night on the water, Op. 91, were composed by Frederick Delius in 1917. He set the wordless works for choir a cappella. The songs were published in 1920 and first performed in 1921.

== History ==
Delius composed the songs at Grez-sur-Loing in 1917. He set them for six-part choir, SATTBB, without words, but vocalises on the syllable "uh". The first song is marked "slow but not dragging", the other which features a solo tenor is marked "gaily, but not quick". A reviewer noted that especially the first song is an example of his "chromatic harmonic language". The wordless pieces have been described as among the composer's "most transcendently ecstatic moments ... as if no words could adequately convey the peculiar fullness of the moment". Only the title serves as a program for the "gratuitous blithesomeness of these two brief yet beguiling choral pieces".

The songs were premiered in London by Charles Kennedy Scott and his Oriana Madrigal Society in London on 28 June 1921. They were first published in London by Winthrop Rogers in 1920, printed again by Boosey & Hawkes, after 1930. They appear in volume 17 of the Collected edition of the composer's works.

The music was arranged for string orchestra by Eric Fenby in 1932, titled Two Aquarelles.

The songs were chosen by the BBC Singers to celebrate their 70th anniversary, recorded at London's St Paul's Church, Knightsbridge, in 1994, conducted by Simon Joly. The Birmingham Conservatoire Chamber Choir, conducted by Paul Spicer, recorded them in 2017 on an album Partsongs by John Ireland and Frederick Delius, in memory of the composer's 150th anniversary of birth. Another 2017 album, by The Carice Singers conducted by George Parris, combines the songs and other works by Delius with choral music by Arnold Bax.

== Sources ==
- To Be Sung of a Summer Night on the Water, RT IV/5 (Delius, Frederick): Scores at the International Music Score Library Project
