= Evening Songs (Julian Lloyd Webber album) =

Studio album by Julian Lloyd Webber
- Recorded: September 2011
- Label: Naxos Records 8.572902

Evening Songs is an album collection of arrangements for cello and piano of songs by Frederick Delius and John Ireland containing three world premiere recordings. The album was recorded by the cellist Julian Lloyd Webber in September 2011 for Naxos.

== Track listing ==
1. Sunset by Frederick Delius
2. Spring Sorrow by John Ireland
3. Birds in the High Hall Garden by Frederick Delius - world premiere recording
4. Evening Song by John Ireland - world premiere recording
5. In the Seraglio Garden by Frederick Delius
6. Love’s Philosophy by Frederick Delius
7. Sea-Fever by John Ireland
8. Over the Mountains High by Frederick Delius
9. The Holy Boy by John Ireland
10. Serenade from Hassan by Frederick Delius
11. Through Long Long Years by Frederick Delius
12. Baby by John Ireland
13. The Three Ravens by John Ireland
14. Little Birdie by Frederick Delius
15. Hope by John Ireland
16. Ladslove by John Ireland
17. Slumber Song by Frederick Delius
18. Summer Schemes by John Ireland
19. With Your Blue Eyes by Frederick Delius
20. Her Song by John Ireland
21. In Summer Woods by John Ireland - world premiere recording

== Personnel ==
- Julian Lloyd Webber, Cello
- Jiaxin Cheng, cello
- John Lenehan, Piano
