= Chanson de Matin =

Musical composition by Edward Elgar

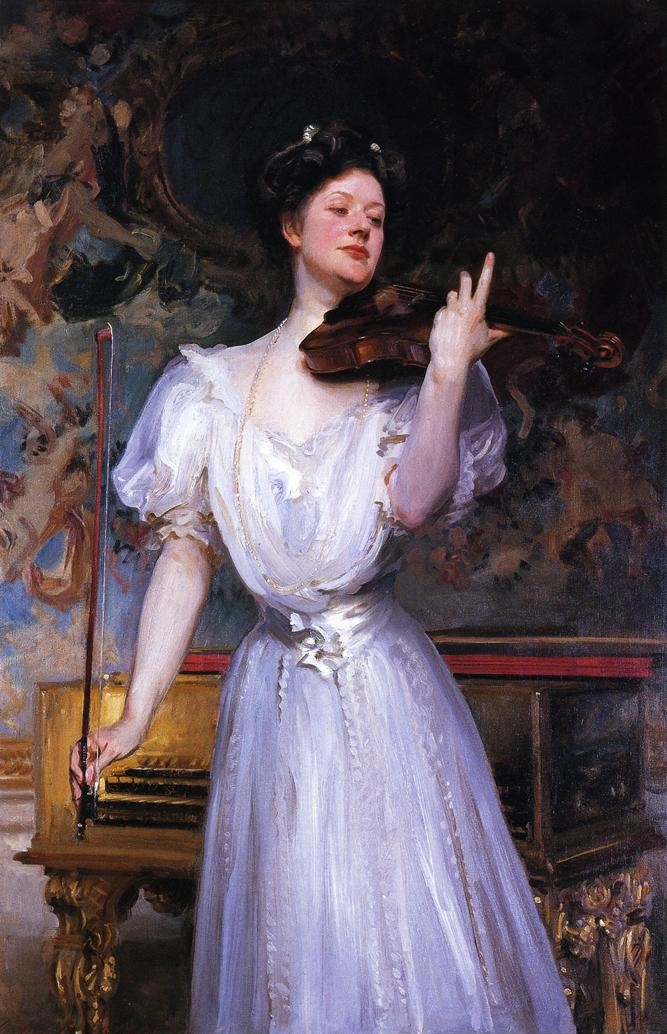
The violinist Leonora Stosch, who played at the concert where the orchestral version was given its London premiere

Chanson de Matin (Morning Song), Op. 15, No. 2, is a musical work composed by Edward Elgar for violin and piano, and later orchestrated by the composer. Its first publication was in 1899, though it is thought that it was almost certainly written in 1889 or 1890.

Elgar also composed a "companion" piece, Chanson de Nuit, Op. 15, No. 1. To some critics Chanson de Matin is the less profound of the two works, however, its fresh melodic appeal has made it more popular.

The orchestral version of the work was published two years later, and first performed, together with Chanson de Nuit, at a Queen's Hall Promenade Concert conducted by Henry Wood on 14 September 1901.

Elgar briefly quotes the melody in the second movement of his String Quartet in E minor of 1918.

== Structure ==
Allegretto, 2/4, G major

Elgar being a violinist himself, the main melody of the piece is scored for the aforesaid instrument.

Following a short two-bar introduction on the piano the violin soars high with a G and sings the first part of the song. Following this the piano takes the baton for a short passage before handing it back to the violinist. This pattern happens once again. As the ending comes, the violin sings an accentuated G, then B as the piano slowly brings it to a close. It means 'morning song'

== Instrumentation ==
Elgar scored Chanson de Matin (and Chanson de Nuit) for a small orchestra consisting of one flute, one oboe, two clarinets, one bassoon, two horns, the string section, and a harp.

== Arrangements ==
The work is most well known in its original setting and the composer's orchestral version.

The most important are his arrangements for cello and piano, and for viola and piano; and by his friend A. Herbert Brewer for organ.

There are arrangements for other instruments, including oboe and piano, recorder ensemble (Dom Gregory Murray), brass quintet (Roger Harvey), and for brass band and wind band.

There is an adaptation for voice and piano published in 1960, "Haste ye feathered songsters", to words by Laurence Swinyard.
