= Travels with My Cello (book) =

Autobiography of Julian Lloyd Webber

Travels with my cello
- Travels with my cello
- Author: Julian Lloyd Webber
- Language: English
- Genre: autobiography
- Publisher: Pavilion Books
- Publication date: 1984
- Publication place: United Kingdom
- Media type: Print (Hardback)
- Pages: 129

The 1984 autobiography by Julian Lloyd Webber, Travels with My Cello, covers his childhood through to travelling the world as a concert performer in the early 1980s. It was first published on 15 October 1984.
