= Julian Lloyd Webber =

British cellist and conductor (born 1951)

Julian Lloyd Webber OBE
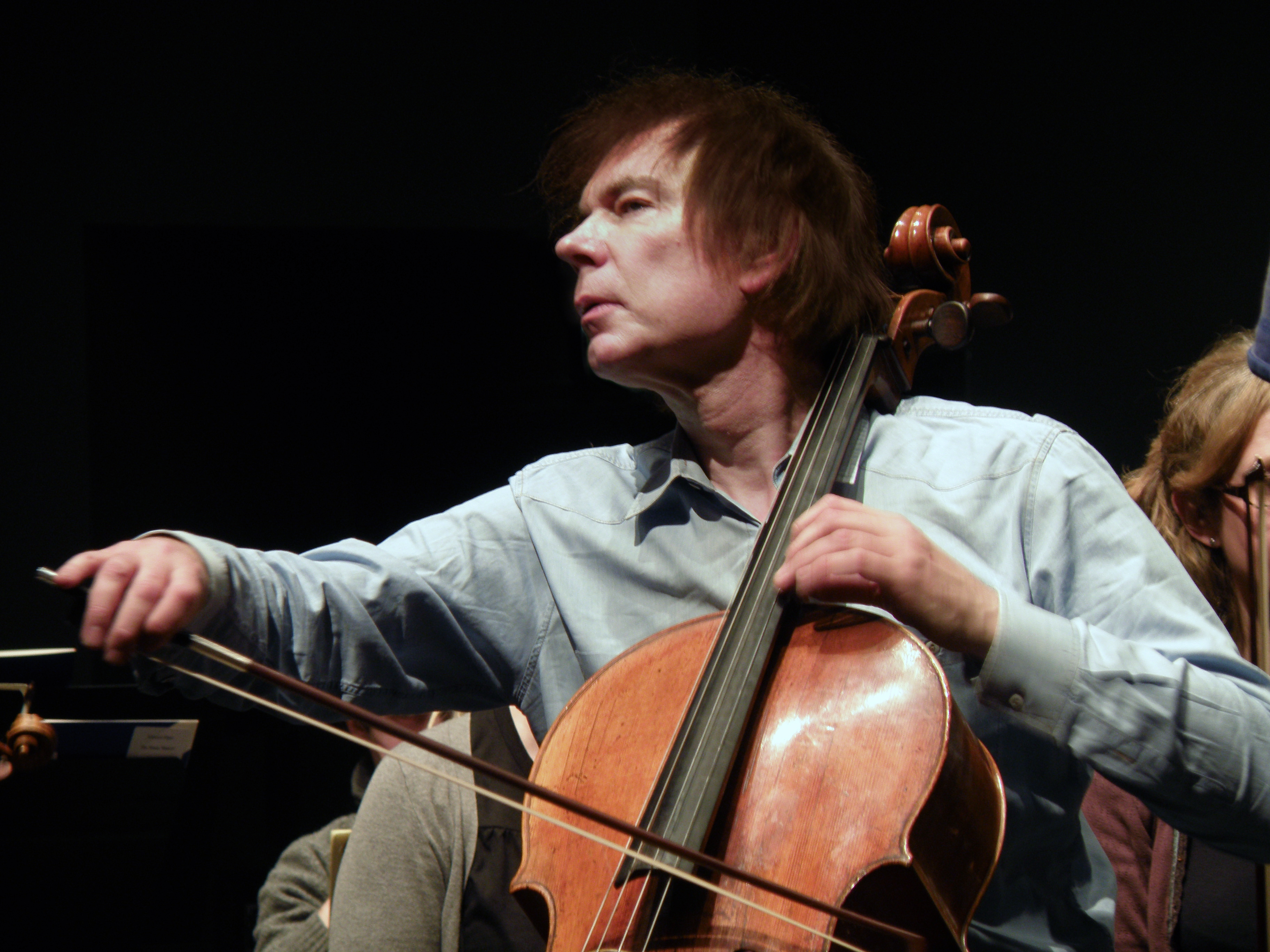
- Lloyd Webber performing in 2013
- Born: 14 April 1951 (age 75)
- Education: Royal College of Music
- Occupations: Cellist; Conductor; Music educator; Composer
- Years active: 1971–present
- Spouses: Celia Ballantyne (m. 1974; div. 1989) Zohra Mahmoud Ghazi (m. 1989; div. 1998) Kheira Bourahla (m. 2001; div. 2008) Jiaxin Cheng (m. 2009)
- Children: 2
- Father: William Lloyd Webber
- Relatives: Andrew Lloyd Webber (brother); Imogen Lloyd Webber (niece); Nick Lloyd Webber (nephew)

Julian Lloyd Webber (born 14 April 1951) is a British solo cellist, conductor and broadcaster, a former principal of Royal Birmingham Conservatoire and the founder of the In Harmony music education programme.

== Early years and education ==
Julian Lloyd Webber is the second son of the composer and music educator William Lloyd Webber and his wife, Jean Johnstone (a piano teacher). He is the younger brother of the composer Andrew Lloyd Webber. The composer Herbert Howells was his godfather. He won a scholarship to the Royal College of Music in 1968 and completed his studies with Pierre Fournier in Geneva in 1973.

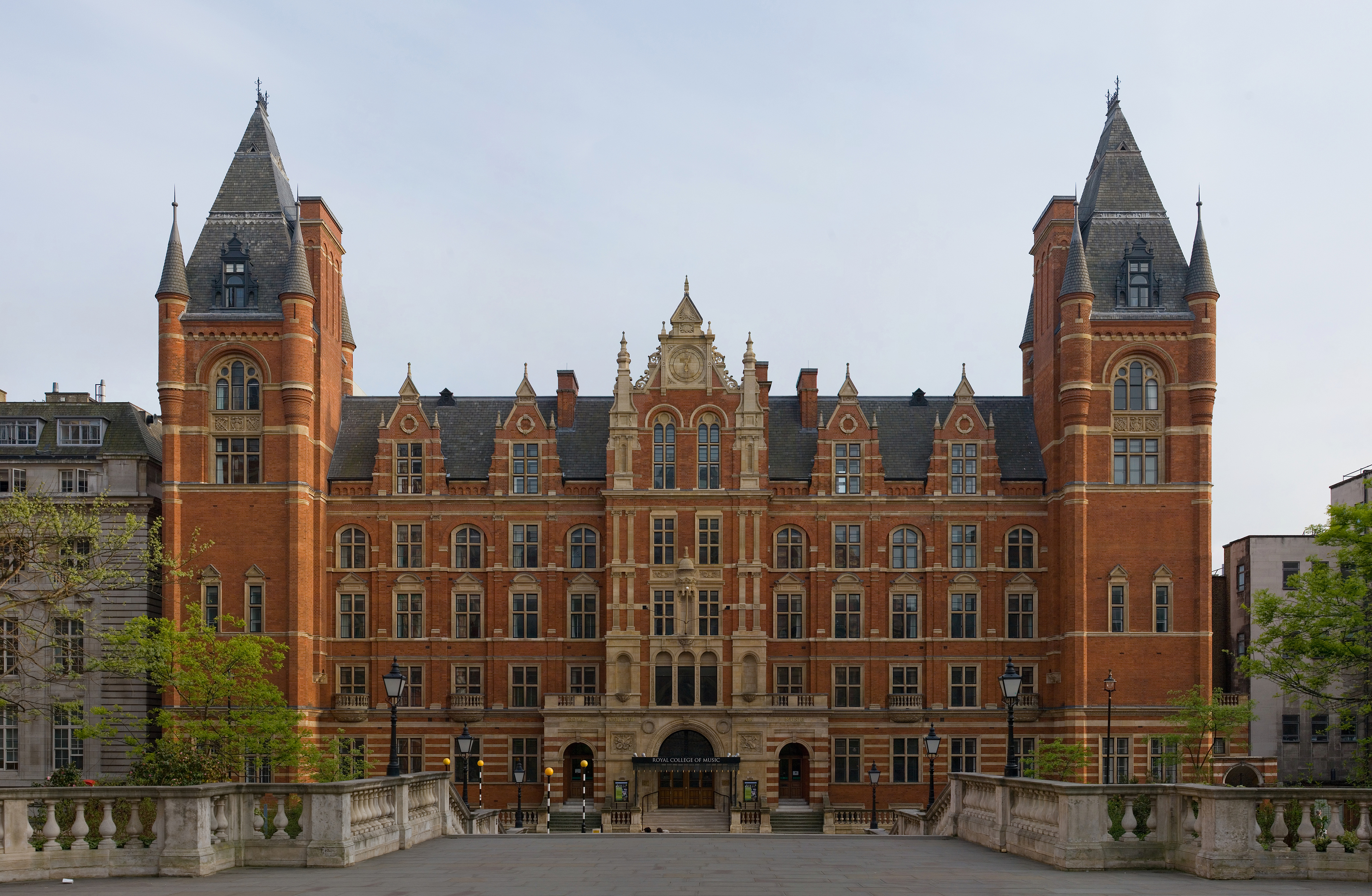
Lloyd Webber studied at the Royal College of Music in London.

== Career ==
Lloyd Webber made his professional debut as a cellist at the Queen Elizabeth Hall, London, in September 1972 when he gave the first London performance of the cello concerto by Sir Arthur Bliss. Throughout his career, he has collaborated with a wide variety of musicians, including conductors Yehudi Menuhin, Lorin Maazel, Neville Marriner, Georg Solti, Yevgeny Svetlanov, Mark Elder, Andrew Davis, Charles Mackerras and Esa-Pekka Salonen, pianists Clifford Curzon and Murray Perahia as well as Stéphane Grappelli, Elton John and Cleo Laine. He was described in The Strad as the "doyen of British cellists".

His many recordings include his BRIT Award-winning Elgar Cello Concerto conducted by Yehudi Menuhin (chosen as the finest ever version by BBC Music Magazine), the Dvořák Cello Concerto with Václav Neumann and the Czech Philharmonic, Tchaikovsky's Rococo Variations with the London Symphony Orchestra under Maxim Shostakovich and a coupling of Britten's Cello Symphony and Walton's Cello Concerto with Sir Neville Marriner and the Academy of St Martin in the Fields which was described as "beyond any rival" by Edward Greenfield in Gramophone magazine, He has also made several recordings of shorter pieces for Universal Classics including Made in England, Cello Moods, Cradle Song and English Idyll.

Lloyd Webber has premiered the recordings of more than 50 works, inspiring new compositions for cello from composers as diverse as Malcolm Arnold (Fantasy for Cello, 1986, and Cello Concerto, 1989), Joaquín Rodrigo (Concierto como un divertimento, 1982) James MacMillan (Cello Sonata No. 2, 2001), and Philip Glass (Cello Concerto, 2001). More recent concert performances have included four further works composed for Lloyd Webber – Michael Nyman's Double Concerto for Cello and Saxophone on BBC Television, Gavin Bryars's Concerto in Suntory Hall, Tokyo, Glass's Cello Concerto at the Beijing International Festival and Eric Whitacre's The River Cam at the Southbank Centre. His recording of the Glass concerto with the Royal Liverpool Philharmonic conducted by Gerard Schwarz was released on Glass' Orange Mountain label in September 2005.

Lloyd Webber's other recordings include The Art of Julian Lloyd Webber (2011), Evening Songs (2012), A Tale of Two Cellos (2013), Vivaldi Concertos for Two Cellos together with Jiaxin Cheng (2014) and his debut recording as a conductor of English music for strings And the Bridge Is Love (2015).

In May 2009, Lloyd Webber was elected President of the Elgar Society in succession to Sir Adrian Boult, Lord Menuhin, and Richard Hickox.

On 28 April 2014, Lloyd Webber announced his retirement from public performance as a cellist because of a herniated disc in his neck which reduced the power in his bow arm. His final public performance as a cellist was on 2 May 2014 at the Festival Theatre, Malvern, with the English Chamber Orchestra.

In September 2014, the charity Live Music Now announced Lloyd Webber as its public spokesman.

In July 2015, Lloyd Webber was appointed Principal of Royal Birmingham Conservatoire.

In 2016, Lloyd Webber scripted and presented 'Classic Cellists at the BBC' for BBC TV and in 2019, to commemorate the centenary of the first performance of Elgar's Cello Concerto in October 1919, Lloyd Webber scripted and presented 'Music in the Air: 100 years of Elgar's Cello Concerto' for Classic FM.

In 2021 Lloyd Webber presented and scripted a five-part series for Classic FM in which he chose "30 under 30 of today's finest young musicians at a time when it has never been more difficult for them to show their talents on stage". In November 2021 Sky Arts screened the TV special "Classic FM's Rising Stars with Julian Lloyd Webber". In July 2022 Lloyd Webber made a further selection of 30 Rising Stars together with Classic FM and another Sky Arts special was shown in November 2022. A third series of Rising Stars was announced by Classic FM in March 2023 and broadcast on 13 November 2023. In November 2023 Lloyd Webber was presented with the London Cello Society's Lifetime Achievement Award. A fifth selection of Rising Stars was aired in December 2025", In December 2025 it was announced that Julian Lloyd Webber would be returning to the concert platform in April 2026 for his 75th Birthday Concert at London's Wigmore Hall"

In April 2026, just before his 75th birthday, Julian Lloyd Webber published his autobiography, Bows and Arrows, in which he discusses his career, his musical family, the 2014 neck injury that ended his playing, and his work in music education.

On 14 April 2026, Lloyd Webber's 75th birthday was marked by a gala charity concert at Wigmore Hall in aid of Music Masters, featuring his wife Jiaxin Lloyd Webber, Mariatu and Isata Kanneh-Mason, and pianists Lauren Zhang, Edward Leung and Rebeca Omordia. Twelve years after retiring from performance due to a herniated disc, Lloyd Webber briefly returned to the stage with a borrowed cello to play Fauré's Élégie, which Keith Clarke of Musical America described as "no comeback—just an amuse-bouche to store in the memory". However, Lloyd Webber has since resumed concerts with a tour of Ireland in August and September 2026 and further performances elsewhere.

== Involvement with music education ==
Demonstrating his long involvement with music education, he formed the Music Education Consortium with James Galway and Evelyn Glennie in 2003. As a result of successful and continued lobbying by the Consortium, on 21 November 2007, the UK government announced an infusion of £332 million for music education. In 2008, the British government invited Lloyd Webber to be chairman of its In Harmony programme which is based on the Venezuelan social programme El Sistema. The government-commissioned Henley Review of Music Education (2011) reported, "There is no doubt that they [the in Harmony projects] have delivered life-changing experiences." In July 2011 the founder of El Sistema in Venezuela, José Antonio Abreu, recognised in Harmony as part of the El Sistema worldwide network. Further, in November 2011 the British government announced additional support for in Harmony across England by extending funding from the Department for Education and adding funding from Arts Council England from 2012 to 2015. Lloyd Webber now chairs the charity Sistema England. In October 2012 he led the Incorporated Society of Musicians campaign against the implementation of the English Baccalaureate which proposed to remove arts subjects from the core curriculum. In February 2013 the government withdrew its plans. Lloyd Webber has represented the arts sector on programmes such as BBC1's Question Time, The Andrew Marr Show, BBC2's Newsnight and BBC Radio 4's Today, The World at One, PM, Front Row and The World Tonight.

Lloyd Webber was part of the expert panel which produced the UK government's Model Music Curriculum in March 2021.

He is a patron of the charity Quartet of Peace, which supports the further education of talented young South African musicians, honorary patron of the Nucleo Project and an inaugural ambassador of the London Music Fund. He is also the patron of Guildford County School and a patron of the Purcell School

== Principal of Royal Birmingham Conservatoire ==
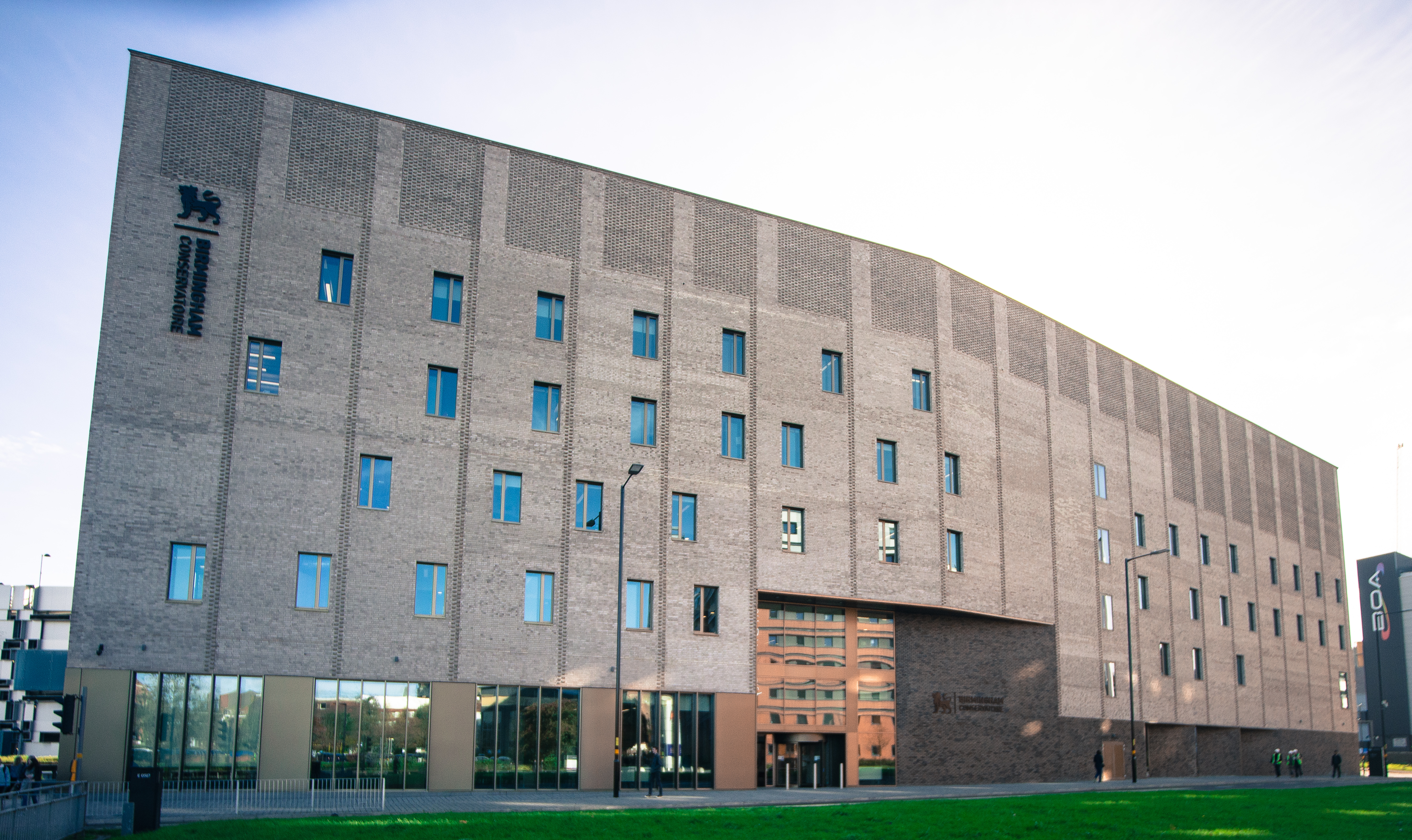
Royal Birmingham Conservatoire

Lloyd Webber was appointed principal of the Royal Birmingham Conservatoire in July 2015. During his five-year tenure he oversaw the move to a new £57 million building on the Birmingham City University City Centre Campus and the merger of the Conservatoire with the Birmingham School of Acting. In September 2017 the Conservatoire received the Royal status by Queen Elizabeth II. In September 2020, in recognition of his tenure, Lloyd Webber was appointed emeritus professor of performing arts by Birmingham City University.

== Honours and awards ==
Lloyd Webber received the Crystal Award at the World Economic Forum in 1998 and a Classic FM Red Award for outstanding services to music in 2005. He won the Best British Classical Recording at the 1986 Brit Awards for his recording of Elgar's Cello Concerto with Sir Yehudi Menuhin and the Royal Philharmonic Orchestra. He was made a Fellow of the Royal College of Music in 1994 and has received honorary doctorates from the University of Hull, Plymouth University and Thames Valley University.

He is vice president of the Delius Society and a patron of Music in Hospitals and the patron of the Elgar Festival He has been an ambassador for the Prince's Trust for more than thirty years and a patron of CLIC Sargent for more than thirty years.

In May 2001, he was granted the first busker's licence on the London Underground.

In September 2009 he joined the board of governors of the Southbank Centre. He was the Foundling Museum's Handel Fellow for 2010. He was the only classical musician chosen to play at the 2012 Summer Olympics closing ceremony.

On 16 April 2014 Lloyd Webber received the Incorporated Society of Musicians Distinguished Musician Award.

Lloyd Webber was appointed Officer of the Order of the British Empire (OBE) in the 2021 Birthday Honours for services to music.

== Personal life ==
In 1974, aged 23, Lloyd Webber married Celia Ballantyne. The marriage was dissolved in 1989. In 1989 he married Zohra Mahmoud Ghazi, a great niece of Mohammed Zahir Shah, king of Afghanistan, with whom he had a son. His third marriage was to French-Algerian Kheira Bourahla. In 2009 he married Jiaxin Cheng (also a cellist). The couple have one daughter.

He is a lifelong supporter of Leyton Orient football club in east London.

== Recordings ==
=== Cello and orchestra ===
- Frank Bridge – Oration (1976)
- Édouard Lalo – Cello Concerto (1982)
- Frederick Delius – Cello Concerto (1982)
- Joaquín Rodrigo – Concierto como un divertimento (1982)
- Joseph Haydn – Cello Concertos No. 1 and No. 4 (1983)
- Edward Elgar – Cello Concerto (1985)
- Victor Herbert – Cello Concerto No. 2 (1986)
- Arthur Sullivan – Cello Concerto (1986)
- Antonín Dvořák – Cello Concerto (1988)
- Arthur Honegger – Cello Concerto (1990)
- Camille Saint-Saëns – Cello Concerto No. 1 (1990)
- Pyotr Ilyich Tchaikovsky – Variations on a Rococo Theme (1991)
- Nikolai Myaskovsky – Cello Concerto (1991)
- Gustav Holst – Invocation (1993)
- Gavin Bryars – Cello Concerto (1994)
- Benjamin Britten – Cello Symphony (1995)
- William Walton – Cello Concerto (1995)
- Michael Nyman – Concerto for Cello, Saxophone and orchestra (1996)
- Max Bruch – Kol Nidrei (1998)
- Granville Bantock – Sapphic Poem (1999)
- Philip Glass – Cello Concerto No. 1 (2003)
- Andrew Lloyd Webber – Phantasia for violin, cello and orchestra (2004)
- Eric Whitacre – The River Cam (2012)
- Vivaldi Concertos for Two Cellos (2014)
- Howard Goodall – And the Bridge Is Love (2015)

=== Cello and piano ===
- Peter Racine Fricker – Cello Sonata (1976)
- John Ireland – Complete Piano Trios (1976)
- Benjamin Britten – Third Suite for Cello (1979)
- Claude Debussy – Cello Sonata (1979)
- John Ireland – Cello Sonata (1979)
- Sergei Rachmaninoff – Cello Sonata (1979)
- Alan Rawsthorne – Cello Sonata (1986)
- Benjamin Britten – Cello Sonata (1988)
- Sergei Prokofiev – Ballade (1988)
- Dmitri Shostakovich – Cello Sonata (1988)
- Gabriel Fauré – Elegie (1990)
- Charles Villiers Stanford – Cello Sonata No. 2 (1991)
- Frederick Delius – Caprice and Elegy (1993)
- Edvard Grieg – Cello Sonata (1995)
- Frederick Delius – Cello Sonata (1995)

=== Solo cello ===
- John McCabe (composer) – Partita for Solo Cello (1976)
- Benjamin Britten – Third Suite for Cello (1979)
- Malcolm Arnold – Fantasy for Cello (1986)
- William Walton – Passacaglia for solo Cello (1986)
- Benjamin Britten – Tema Sacher (1979)
- J. S. Bach – Bourrées from Suite No. 3 (1973)
- Trad. Irish – "Star of the County Down" (1993)

=== Cross-genre ===
- Variations with Gary Moore, Barbara Thompson, Jon Hiseman, Rod Argent (1978)
- Oasis, with Peter Skellern and Mary Hopkin (1984)
- Two Worlds, with Lee Ritenour and Dave Grusin (2000)

=== Collections ===
- Travels with My Cello (1984)
- Pieces (1985)
- Encore! – Travels with my Cello Vol. 2 (1986)
- Lloyd Webber Plays Lloyd Webber (1989)
- Cello Song (1993)
- English Idyll (1994)
- Cradle Song (1995)
- Cello Moods (1998)
- Elegy (1999)
- Celebration (2001)
- Made in England (2003)
- Unexpected Songs (2006)
- Romantic Cello Concertos (2009)
- Fair Albion – Music by Patrick Hawes (2009)
- The Art of Julian Lloyd Webber (2011)
- Evening Songs (2012)
- A Tale of Two Cellos (2013)
- A Span of Time (2018)
- The Singing Strad (2021)
- Take a Bow (2026) – 75th birthday retrospective double album, including the première recording of Lloyd Webber's own composition Jasmine

=== Conducting ===
- And the Bridge Is Love – English Music for Strings, English Chamber Orchestra (2015)

== First performances ==
Composer	Work	First performance
Malcolm Arnold	Fantasy for Cello	Wigmore Hall, London, December 1987
Malcolm Arnold	Cello Concerto	Royal Festival Hall, London, March 1989
Richard Rodney Bennett	Dream Sequence for Cello and Piano	Wigmore Hall, London, December 1994
Frank Bridge	Scherzetto for Cello and Piano	Snape Maltings, April 1979
Frank Bridge	Oration for Cello and Orchestra (1st public performance)	Bromsgrove Festival, Worcestershire, April 1979
Gavin Bryars	Cello Concerto (Farewell to Philosophy)	Barbican Centre, London, November 1995
Geoffrey Burgon	Six Studies for Solo Cello	Portsmouth Cathedral, June 1980
John Dankworth	Fair Oak Fusion	Fair Oak, Sussex, July 1979
Frederick Delius	Romance for Cello and Piano	Helsinki Festival, Finland, June 1976
Edward Elgar	Romance for Cello and Piano	Wigmore Hall, London, April 1985
Philip Glass	Cello Concerto	Beijing Festival, China, September 2001
Vladimír Godár	Barcarolle for Cello, Strings, Harp and Harpsichord	Hellenic Centre, London, April 1994
Howard Goodall	And the Bridge Is Love for Cello, Strings and Harp	Chipping Campden Festival, May 2008
Patrick Hawes	Gloriette for Cello and Piano	Leeds Castle, Kent, August 2008
Joseph Haydn (attrib.)	Concerto in D, Hob. VIIb:4	Queen Elizabeth Hall, London, November 1981
Christopher Headington	Serenade for Cello and Strings	Banqueting House, London, January 1995
Karl Jenkins	Benedictus for Cello, Choir and Orchestra from The Armed Man	Royal Albert Hall, London, April 2000
Philip Lane	Soliloquy for Solo Cello	Wangford Festival, Suffolk, July 1972
Andrew Lloyd Webber	Variations	Sydmonton Festival, Newbury, July 1977
Andrew Lloyd Webber	Phantasia (Concerto for Violin, Cello and Orchestra)	Izmir Festival, Turkey, July 2008
William Lloyd Webber	Nocturne for Cello and Piano	Purcell Room, London, February 1995
James MacMillan	Cello Sonata No. 2	Queen's Hall, Edinburgh, April 2001
Michael Nyman	Concerto for Cello and Saxophone	Royal Festival Hall, London, March 1997
Joaquín Rodrigo	Concierto como un divertimento	Royal Festival Hall, London, April 1982
Peter Skellern	Five Love Songs for Cello, Piano, Vocals and Brass Quintet	Salisbury International Arts Festival, September 1982
Arthur Sullivan	Cello Concerto (orchestrated Mackerras)	Barbican Centre, London, April 1986
Ralph Vaughan Williams	Fantasia on Sussex Folk Tunes for Cello and Orchestra	Three Choirs Festival, Gloucester, August 1983
William Walton	Theme for a Prince for Solo Cello	Adrian Boult Hall, Birmingham, October 1998
Eric Whitacre	The River Cam for cello and strings	Royal Festival Hall, London, April 2011

== Publications ==
- Travels with My Cello, Julian Lloyd Webber, Pavilion Books, London (1984). ISBN 0-907516-27-0
- Julian Lloyd Webber: Married to Music. The Authorised Biography, Margaret Campbell, Robson Books, London (2001). ISBN 1-86105-400-9.
- Short Sharp Shocks – A Masterclass of the Macabre, ed. Julian Lloyd Webber, Weidenfeld & Nicolson 1990, ISBN 978-0-297-81147-3.
- Song of the Birds. Sayings, Stories and Impressions of Pablo Casals, compiled, edited and with a foreword by Lloyd Webber, Robson Books, London (1985 . ISBN 0-86051-305-X
- Numerous editions including Arnold's Fantasy for Cello (Faber Music), Rodrigo's Concierto como un divertimento (Schott) and a series of editions for Faber Music's Young Cellists' Repertoire (books 1, 2 and 3), followed by two advanced volumes, Recital Repertoire for Cellists (books 1 and 2.)
- Editions of the major cello repertoire, The Julian Lloyd Webber Performing Edition, Kevin Mayhew Ltd.
- Viva Casals! Sayings, Stories and Impressions of Pablo Casals (editor), Biteback Publishing, 25 November 2025. ISBN 978-1-78590-988-7 (Revised and expanded edition of Song of the Birds, 1985.)
- Bows and Arrows: The Autobiography, Biteback Publishing, 7 April 2026. ISBN 978-1-83736-058-1
