= Nocturne (Taube song) =

Nocturne is a Swedish love song and lullaby which was composed in 1948 by Evert Taube. The song is also called "Sov på min arm", from the first line of the lyrics. The song was first performed in the film "Sjösalavår" in 1949. The song was first recorded by the composer's son, Sven-Bertil Taube, in 1954 and has been covered many times since.
