= Lloyd Webber Plays Lloyd Webber =

Lloyd Webber plays Lloyd Webber

Studio album by Julian Lloyd Webber
- Released: 1989
- Genres: Musicals, show tunes
- Length: 59:36
- Label: Philips Classics

Lloyd Webber Plays Lloyd Webber is a 1989 album by British cellist Julian Lloyd Webber interpreting songs written by his older brother, the popular musical theatre composer Andrew Lloyd Webber. The album was recorded with the Royal Philharmonic Orchestra conducted by Barry Wordsworth. The album primarily featured classical musicians with the notable exception of Rod Argent of The Zombies.

== Track listing ==
1. "No Matter What" from Whistle Down the Wind
2. "The Music of the Night" from The Phantom of the Opera
3. "Memory" from Cats
4. "Don't Cry for Me Argentina" from Evita
5. "Our Kind of Love" from The Beautiful Game
6. "With One Look" from Sunset Boulevard
7. "I Don't Know How to Love Him" from Jesus Christ Superstar
8. "Starlight Express" from the musical of the same name
9. "Buenos Aires" from Evita
10. "Love Changes Everything" from Aspects of Love
11. "The Perfect Year" from Sunset Boulevard
12. "All I Ask of You" from The Phantom of the Opera
13. "God's Own Country" from The Beautiful Game
14. "Tell Me on a Sunday" from Song and Dance
15. "Variations 1–4" from Variations
16. "Close Every Door" from Joseph and the Amazing Technicolor Dreamcoat
17. "John 19:41" from Jesus Christ Superstar
18. "Pie Jesu" from Requiem
19. "Whistle Down the Wind" from the musical of the same name
