= Songs My Mother Taught Me (Dvořák) =

Art song composed by Antonín Dvořák

Songs my mother taught me (2:24)
Composed in 1880 by Antonin Dvorák (1841-1904), text by Adolf Heyduk (1835-1923), performed by Australian singer Nellie Melba (1861-1931) in 1916. This is sung in English.

"Songs My Mother Taught Me" (Czech: Když mne stará matka zpívat učívala; German: Als die alte Mutter sang) is a song for voice and piano written in 1880 by Antonín Dvořák. It is the fourth of seven songs from his cycle Gypsy Songs (Czech: Cigánské melodie), B. 104, Op. 55. The Gypsy Songs are set to poems by Adolf Heyduk in both Czech and German. This song in particular has achieved widespread fame.

The song has been recorded by a number of well-known singers, including Jarmila Novotná, Gabriela Beňačková, Evan Williams, Gervase Elwes, Nellie Melba, Rosa Ponselle, Jeanette MacDonald, Elisabeth Schwarzkopf, Victoria de los Angeles, Joan Sutherland, Paul Robeson, Frederica von Stade, Edita Gruberová, Angela Gheorghiu, Magdalena Kožená, and Renée Fleming.

Fritz Kreisler transcribed the song for violin and piano and performed it frequently. His transcription was first published in 1914. Artists who have recorded instrumental versions of the song include Kreisler himself, Glenn Miller, Josef Suk, Yo-Yo Ma, Alisa Weilerstein, Itzhak Perlman, Joshua Bell and Tine Thing Helseth.

The title Songs My Mother Taught Me has frequently been used by singers in recitals or on recital discs even when the song itself is not included in the recording. It was recommended by Classic FM (UK) as one of "10 beautiful pieces of classical music for Mother's Day".

== Lyrics ==
Czech text
Když mne stará matka zpívat, zpívat učívala,
podivno, že často, často slzívala.
A teď také pláčem snědé líce mučím,
když cigánské děti hrát a zpívat, hrát a zpívat učím!
English translation
(this is not a literal translation, but a singable translation)

Songs my mother taught me, In the days long vanished;Seldom from her eyelids were the teardrops banished.Now I teach my children, each melodious measure.Oft the tears are flowing, oft they flow from my memory's treasure.

German text by Adolf Heyduk
(this is not a literal translation, but a singable one)

Als die alte Mutter mich noch lehrte singen,Tränen in den Wimpern gar so oft ihr hingen.Jetzt, wo ich die Kleinen selber üb’ im Sange,rieselt’s in den Bart oft, rieselt’s von der braunen Wange.

== Discography ==
- Frederica von Stade (mezzo-soprano) and Rudolf Firkušný (piano), Sony CD (1994) and Kultur DVD (2007)
