= List of Classical Artist Albums Chart number ones of the 2010s =

This is the list of the number-one albums of the Classical Artist Albums Chart during the 2010s.

In April 2012, Noah Stewart became the first black artist ever to top the Classical Artist Albums Chart. In January 2013, In a Time Lapse by Ludovico Einaudi became the first classical album ever to sell more digital downloads than physical copies. In September 2014, Rebecca Newman became the first independent soprano to reach the top spot.

== Number ones ==
Key
| † | Best-selling classical album of the year |

| Artist (Note: The artist, album, date of reaching number one and number of weeks at number one are those given by the Official Charts Company.) | Album | Record label (Note: The record labels are those given by the Official Charts Company.) | Reached number one | Weeks at number one |
2010
| André Rieu | Forever Vienna † | Decca | 3 January 2010 | 27 |
| Craig Ogden | The Guitarist | Classic FM | 11 July 2010 | 5 |
| André Rieu | Forever Vienna † | Decca | 15 August 2010 | 7 |
| Central Band of the RAF | Reach for the Skies | Decca | 3 October 2010 | 6 |
| Benedictine Nuns of Notre-Dame | Voices – Chant From Avignon | Decca | 14 November 2010 | 1 |
| André Rieu & the Johann Strauss Orchestra | Moonlight Serenade | Decca | 21 November 2010 | 18 |
2011
| Wynne Evans | A Song in My Heart | WEA | 27 March 2011 | 2 |
| Band of the Coldstream Guards | Pride of the Nation | Decca | 10 April 2011 | 5 |
| André Rieu & the Johann Strauss Orchestra | Moonlight Serenade | Decca | 15 May 2011 | 4 |
| Craig Ogden | Summertime | Classic FM | 12 June 2011 | 3 |
| Ludovico Einaudi | Islands – Essential | Decca | 3 July 2011 | 2 |
| Miloš Karadaglić | The Guitar | Deutsche Grammophon | 17 July 2011 | 2 |
| Laura Wright | The Last Rose | Decca | 31 July 2011 | 5 |
| Hayley Westenra/Ennio Morricone | Paradiso | Decca | 4 September 2011 | 5 |
| Katherine Jenkins | One Fine Day | Decca | 9 October 2011 | 5 |
| André Rieu & the Johann Strauss Orchestra | And the Waltz Goes On † | Decca | 13 November 2011 | 6 |
| Andrea Bocelli | Concerto: One Night in Central Park | Decca/Sugar | 25 December 2011 | 1 |
2012
| André Rieu & the Johann Strauss Orchestra | And the Waltz Goes On | Decca | 1 January 2012 | 1 |
| The Sixteen/Harry Christophers | Renaissance – Music for Inner Peace | Decca | 8 January 2012 | 4 |
| André Rieu & the Johann Strauss Orchestra | And the Waltz Goes On | Decca | 5 February 2012 | 1 |
| André Rieu | The Magic of | Motif | 12 February 2012 | 3 |
| André Rieu | Waltzing in Europe | Motif | 4 March 2012 | 4 |
| Noah Stewart | Noah | Decca | 1 April 2012 | 5 |
| Ludovico Einaudi | Islands – Essential | Decca | 6 May 2012 | 4 |
| Russell Watson | Anthems | Sony Classical | 3 June 2012 | 7 |
| Katherine Jenkins | Best of British | Decca | 22 July 2012 | 1 |
| West-Eastern Divan/Daniel Barenboim | Beethoven for All – Music of Power, Passion & Beauty | Decca | 29 July 2012 | 2 |
| Ludovico Einaudi | Islands – Essential | Decca | 12 August 2012 | 2 |
| St. Petersburg Chamber Choir | Tranquillity – Voices of Deep Calm | Decca | 26 August 2012 | 1 |
| Nicola Benedetti | The Silver Violin | Decca | 2 September 2012 | 6 |
| Russell Watson | Anthems | Sony Classical | 14 October 2012 | 1 |
| Friar Allesandro | Voice From Assisi | Decca | 21 October 2012 | 3 |
| André Rieu & the Johann Strauss Orchestra | Magic of the Movies † | Decca | 11 November 2012 | 11 |
2013
| Ludovico Einaudi | In a Time Lapse | Decca | 27 January 2013 | 2 |
| Richard Clayderman | Romantique | Decca | 10 February 2013 | 2 |
| Ludovico Einaudi | In a Time Lapse | Decca | 24 February 2013 | 1 |
| Richard Clayderman | Romantique | Decca | 3 March 2013 | 2 |
| André Rieu | In Love with Maastricht | Decca | 17 March 2013 | 1 |
| André Rieu & the Johann Strauss Orchestra | Magic of the Movies † | Decca | 24 March 2013 | 1 |
| André Rieu | In Love with Maastricht | Decca | 31 March 2013 | 1 |
| Miloš Karadaglić | Latino | Deutsche Grammophon | 7 April 2013 | 1 |
| André Rieu | In Love with Maastricht | Decca | 14 April 2013 | 2 |
| Ludovico Einaudi | In a Time Lapse | Decca | 28 April 2013 | 1 |
| Amy Dickson | Dusk & Dawn | Sony Classical | 5 May 2013 | 1 |
| Ludovico Einaudi | In a Time Lapse | Decca | 12 May 2013 | 3 |
| London Philharmonic Orchestra/David Parry | The 50 Greatest Pieces of Classical Music | X5 | 2 June 2013 | 2 |
| André Rieu | In Love with Maastricht | Decca | 16 June 2013 | 2 |
| London Philharmonic Orchestra/David Parry | The 50 Greatest Pieces of Classical Music | X5 | 30 June 2013 | 1 |
| Martynas | Martynas | Decca | 7 July 2013 | 2 |
| Ludovico Einaudi | Islands – Essential | Decca | 21 July 2013 | 2 |
| Daniel Hope | Spheres | Deutsche Grammophon | 4 August 2013 | 1 |
| Ludovico Einaudi | In a Time Lapse | Decca | 11 August 2013 | 1 |
| BBC Concert Orchestra/Barry Wordsworth | The Last Night of the Proms Collection | Philips | 18 August 2013 | 2 |
| André Rieu | Rieu Royale | Decca | 1 September 2013 | 1 |
| Luciano Pavarotti | The 50 Greatest Tracks | Decca | 8 September 2013 | 5 |
| André Rieu & the Johann Strauss Orchestra | Magic of the Movies † | Decca | 13 October 2013 | 3 |
| André Rieu | Rieu Royale | Decca | 3 November 2013 | 1 |
| Katherine Jenkins | This Is Christmas | Warner Bros. | 10 November 2013 | 2 |
| André Rieu | December Lights | Decca | 24 November 2013 | 2 |
| Jack Topping | Wonderful World | Decca | 8 December 2013 | 1 |
| André Rieu | December Lights | Decca | 15 December 2013 | 2 |
| Kings College Choir/David Willcocks | Essential Carols | Decca | 29 December 2013 | 1 |
2014
| Ludovico Einaudi | Islands – Essential | Decca | 5 January 2014 | 4 |
| Ji Liu | Piano Reflections | Classic FM | 2 February 2014 | 1 |
| Voces8 | Eventide | Decca | 9 February 2014 | 2 |
| Karadaglic/LPO/Nezet-Sequin | Aranjuez | Mercury Classics | 23 February 2014 | 2 |
| Ludovico Einaudi | Islands – Essential | Decca | 9 March 2014 | 6 |
| Rhydian | One Day Like This | Futura Classics | 20 April 2014 | 10 |
| Ludovico Einaudi | Islands – Essential | Decca | 29 June 2014 | 1 |
| Craig Ogden | Summer Guitar | Classic FM/Decca | 6 July 2014 | 1 |
| Nicola Benedetti | Homecoming | Decca | 13 July 2014 | 5 |
| Ludovico Einaudi | Islands – Essential | Decca | 17 August 2014 | 2 |
| Craig Ogden | Summer Guitar | Classic FM/Decca | 31 August 2014 | 1 |
| Ludovico Einaudi | Islands – Essential | Decca | 7 September 2014 | 1 |
| Alison Balsom | Paris | WEA Records | 14 September 2014 | 1 |
| Rebecca Newman | Dare to Dream | Rambling Rose | 21 September 2014 | 1 |
| Maria Callas | Pure | WEA Records | 28 September 2014 | 1 |
| Lucy Kay | Fantasia | Sony Classical | 5 October 2014 | 2 |
| Jonathan Antoine | Tenore | Sony Classical | 19 October 2014 | 3 |
| André Rieu | Love In Venice † | Decca | 9 November 2014 | 2 |
| Katherine Jenkins | Home Sweet Home | Decca | 23 November 2014 | 1 |
| André Rieu | Love In Venice † | Decca | 30 November 2014 | 14 |
2015
| London Philharmonic Orchestra/David Parry | The 50 Greatest Pieces of Classical Music | X5 | 8 March 2015 | 1 |
| André Rieu | Love In Venice | Decca | 15 March 2015 | 1 |
| Ólafur Arnalds/Alice Sara Ott | The Chopin Project | Mercury Classics | 22 March 2015 | 1 |
| London Philharmonic Orchestra/David Parry | The 50 Greatest Pieces of Classical Music | X5 | 29 March 2015 | 2 |
| The Sixteen/Harry Christophers | Monteverdi/Vespers of 1610 | CORO | 12 April 2015 | 2 |
| Ludovico Einaudi | Islands – Essential | Decca | 26 April 2015 | 1 |
| London Philharmonic Orchestra/David Parry | The 50 Greatest Pieces of Classical Music | X5 | 3 May 2015 | 1 |
| André Rieu & Johann Strauss Orchestra | Magic Of the Violin | Decca | 10 May 2015 | 7 |
| Craig Ogden | Craig Ogden and Friends | Classic FM | 28 June 2015 | 9 |
| Joyce DiDonato & Antonio Pappano | Joyce & Tony Live at Wigmore Hall | Erato | 4 September 2015 | 1 |
| Max Richter | Sleep | Deutsche Grammophon | 11 September 2015 | 1 |
| Jonas Kaufmann | Nessun Dorma - The Puccini Album | Sony Classical | 18 September 2015 | 2 |
| Max Richter | Sleep | Deutsche Grammophon | 2 October 2015 | 1 |
| Orchestra dell'Accademia Nazionale di Santa Cecilia/Antonio Pappano | Verdi/Aida | Warner Classics | 9 October 2015 | 1 |
| Nigel Kennedy | Vivaldi/The New Four Seasons | Sony Classical | 16 October 2015 | 1 |
| Ludovico Einaudi | Elements | Decca | 23 October 2015 | 2 |
| Andrea Bocelli | Cinema | Decca | 6 November 2015 | 1 |
| Alexander Armstrong | A Year of Songs † | East West | 13 November 2015 | 1 |
| André Rieu & the Johann Strauss Orchestra | Roman Holiday | Decca | 20 November 2015 | 1 |
| Alexander Armstrong | A Year of Songs † | East West | 27 November 2015 | 14 |
2016
| Richard & Adam | Believe - Songs of Inspiration | Sony Masterworks | 4 March 2016 | 3 |
| Hans Zimmer & Junkie XL | Batman V Superman - Dawn of Justice OST | Sony Classical | 25 March 2016 | 2 |
| Aled Jones | One Voice † | Decca | 8 April 2016 | 3 |
| Katherine Jenkins | Celebration | Decca | 29 April 2016 | 1 |
| Aled Jones | One Voice † | Decca | 6 May 2016 | 12 |
| Ludovico Einaudi | Islands – Essential | Decca | 29 July 2016 | 1 |
| See Siang Wong | Cinema Classics - The Piano At The Movies | Sony Classical | 5 August 2016 | 2 |
| Ludovico Einaudi | Islands – Essential | Decca | 19 August 2016 | 1 |
| André Rieu | Viva Olympia | Decca | 26 August 2016 | 3 |
| Trevor Morrison/Scottish Festival Orchestra/James MacMillan | The Lost Songs of St Kilda | Decca | 16 September 2016 | 4 |
| Karl Jenkins | Cantata Memoria - For The Children | Decca | 14 October 2016 | 3 |
| Olafur Arnalds | Island Songs | Decca | 4 November 2016 | 1 |
| Alexander Armstrong | A Year of Songs | East West | 11 November 2016 | 1 |
| Ennio Morricone | Morricone 60 | Decca | 18 November 2016 | 1 |
| Alexander Armstrong | A Year of Songs | East West | 25 November 2016 | 1 |
| Aled Jones | One Voice at Christmas | Classic FM | 2 December 2016 | 5 |
2017
| London Philharmonic Orchestra/David Parry | The 50 Greatest Pieces of Classical Music | X5 | 6 January 2017 | 2 |
| Ludovico Einaudi | Islands – Essential | Decca | 20 January 2017 | 2 |
| Max Richter | Three Worlds - Music From Woolf Works | Deutsche Grammophon | 3 February 2017 | 3 |
| Ludovico Einaudi | Islands – Essential | Decca | 24 February 2017 | 2 |
| Alfie Boe | Love Was a Dream | Decca | 10 March 2017 | 1 |
| Joanna Forest | Stars Are Rising | Arts Records | 17 March 2017 | 1 |
| Aled Jones/St Pauls Choir/Andrew Carwood | Classic FM's Pts Jubilate - 500 Years of Cathedral Music | Decca | 24 March 2017 | 5 |
| Ludovico Einaudi | Islands – Essential | Decca | 28 April 2017 | 3 |
| Cantus | Northern Lights | Decca | 25 May 2017 | 1 |
| Ludovico Einaudi | Islands – Essential | Decca | 1 June 2017 | 2 |
| London Philharmonic Orchestra/David Parry | The 50 Greatest Pieces of Classical Music | X5 | 15 June 2017 | 2 |
| Ludovico Einaudi | Islands – Essential | Decca | 29 June 2017 | 4 |
| Jonathan Antoine | Believe | Cavedish | 27 July 2017 | 1 |
| Ludovico Einaudi | Islands – Essential | Decca | 3 August 2017 | 8 |
| Jonas Kaufmann | L'Opera | Sony Classical | 22 September 2017 | 1 |
| The Ayoub Sisters | Ayoub Sisters | Decca | 29 September 2017 | 1 |
| Karl Jenkins | Symphonic Adiemus | Decca | 6 October 2017 | 1 |
| Ludovico Einaudi | Islands – Essential | Decca | 13 October 2017 | 4 |
| Aled Jones | One Voice - Believe | Global | 10 November 2017 | 3 |
| André Rieu | Amore | Decca | 1 December 2017 | 9 |
2018
| Sheku Kanneh-Mason | Inspiration | Decca | 2 February 2018 | 2 |
| André Rieu | Amore | Decca | 16 February 2018 | 1 |
| Sheku Kanneh-Mason | Inspiration | Decca | 23 February 2018 | 1 |
| Tony Banks | Five | BMG | 2 March 2018 | 1 |
| Alan Titchmarsh, Debbie Wiseman and National Symphony Orchestra | The Glorious Garden | Classic FM | 9 March 2018 | 3 |
| Ludovico Einaudi | Islands – Essential | Decca | 30 March 2018 | 1 |
| Blake | The Anniversary Album | Blake | 6 April 2018 | 1 |
| Ludovico Einaudi | Islands – Essential | Decca | 13 April 2018 | 2 |
| Rachel Podger | Vivaldi: Le Quattro Stagioni (The Four Seasons) | Channel Classics | 27 April 2018 | 1 |
| Ludovico Einaudi | Islands – Essential | Decca | 4 May 2018 | 1 |
| London Symphony Orchestra | John Williams - A Life In Music | Decca | 11 May 2018 | 2 |
| Sheku Kanneh-Mason | Inspiration | Decca | 25 May 2018 | 10 |
| Ludovico Einaudi | Islands – Essential | Decca | 3 August 2018 | 3 |
| Sheku Kanneh-Mason | Inspiration | Decca | 24 August 2018 | 1 |
| Ludovico Einaudi | Islands – Essential | Decca | 31 August 2018 | 1 |
| Alexis Ffrench | Evolution | Sony Classical | 7 September 2018 | 3 |
| Ludovico Einaudi | Islands – Essential | Decca | 28 September 2018 | 2 |
| Patrick Hawes, Royal Philharmonic Orchestra & National Youth Choir of Great Britain | The Great War Symphony | Classic FM | 12 October 2018 | 1 |
| Ludovico Einaudi | Islands – Essential | Decca | 19 October 2018 | 1 |
| Bryn Terfel | Dreams and Songs | Deutsche Grammophon | 26 October 2018 | 1 |
| Andrea Bocelli | Si | Decca | 2 November 2018 | 20 |
2019
| Ludovico Einaudi | Seven Days Walking Day One | Decca | 28 March 2019 | 2 |
| Beth Gibbons/The Polish National Radio Symphony Orchestra&Krystof Penderecki | Gorecki/Symphony No 3 | Domino | 11 April 2019 | 1 |
| Andrea Bocelli | Si | Decca | 18 April 2019 | 2 |
| Ludovico Einaudi | Seven Days Walking Day Two | Decca | 2 May 2019 | 1 |
| Jess Gillam | Rise | Decca | 9 May 2019 | 2 |
| Ludovico Einaudi | Islands – Essential | Decca | 23 May 2019 | 1 |
| Katherine Jenkins | Guiding Light | Decca | 30 May 2019 | 1 |
| Ludovico Einaudi | Islands – Essential | Decca | 6 June 2019 | 1 |
| Lise Davidsen and Philharmonia Orchestra | Lise Davidsen | Decca | 13 June 2019 | 1 |
| Andrea Bocelli | Si | Decca | 20 June 2019 | 2 |
| Ludovico Einaudi | Seven Days Walking Day Four | Decca | 4 July 2019 | 1 |
| Ludovico Einaudi | Islands – Essential | Decca | 11 July 2019 | 1 |
| Isata Kanneh-Mason | Romance - The Piano Music of Clara | Decca | 18 July 2019 | 1 |
| Luciano Pavarotti | The Greatest Hits | Decca | 25 July 2019 | 1 |
| Ludovico Einaudi | Islands – Essential | Decca | 1 August 2019 | 8 |
| Miloš Karadaglić | Sound of Silence | Decca | 26 September 2019 | 1 |
| Ludovico Einaudi | Islands – Essential | Decca | 3 October 2019 | 3 |
| Karl Jenkins | Miserere - Songs of Mercy & Redemption | Decca | 24 October 2019 | 1 |
| Ludovico Einaudi | Islands – Essential | Decca | 31 October 2019 | 2 |
| Aled Jones and Russell Watson | Back in Harmony | BMG | 14 November 2019 | 3 |
| André Rieu and The Johann Strauss Orchestra | Happy Days | Decca | 5 December 2019 | 7 |

=== By artist ===
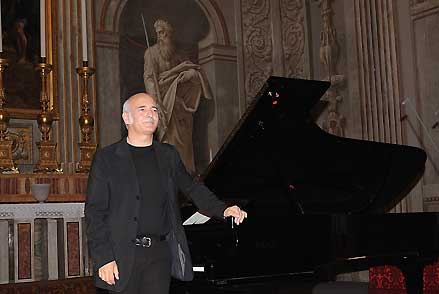
Ludovico Einaudi reached number one with six albums during the 2010s.

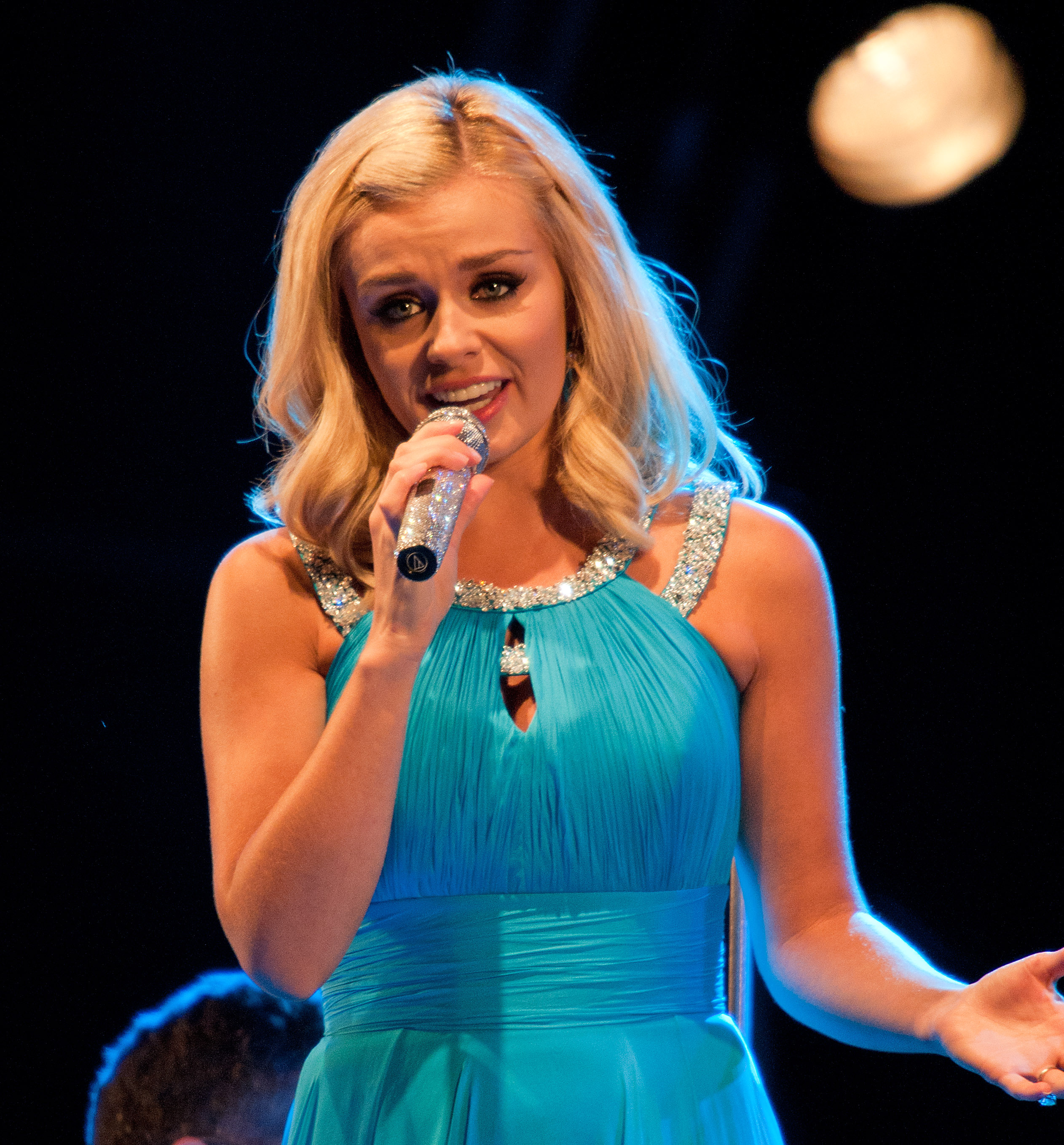
Katherine Jenkins has topped the chart for eleven weeks so far this decade.

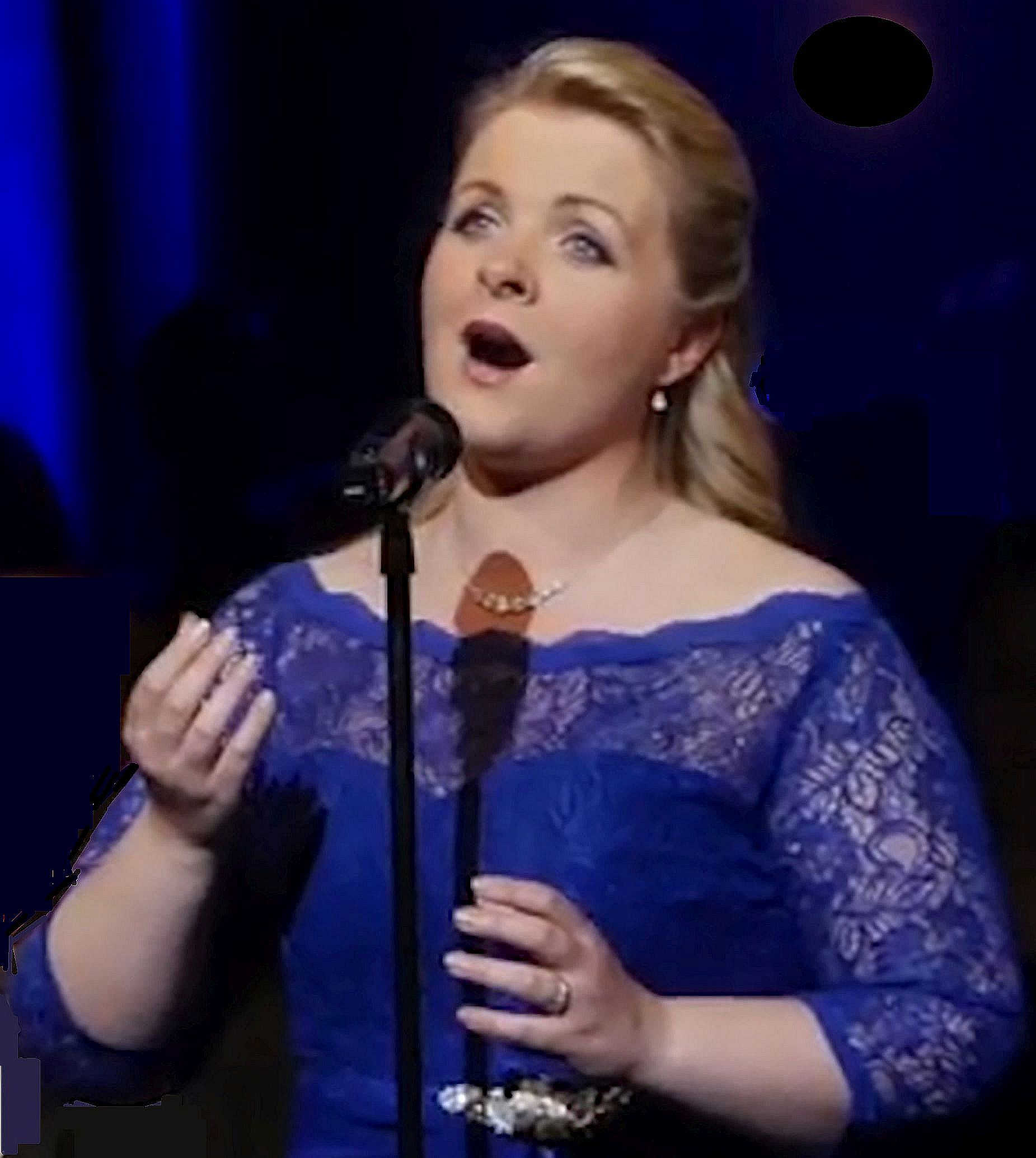
Rebecca Newman became the first independent soprano to reach the top spot, in September 2014.

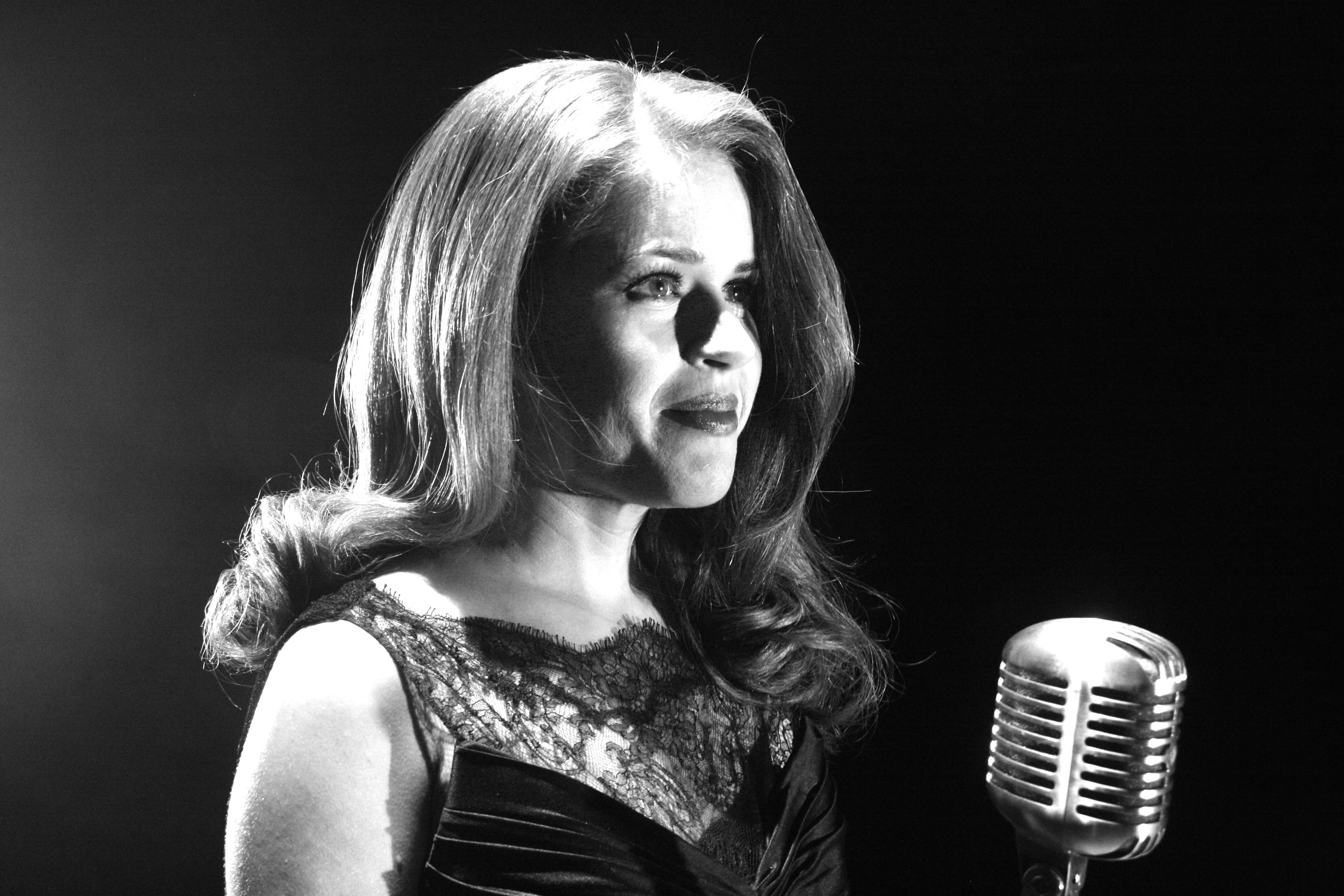
Joanna Forest became the first independent soprano to reach number one with a debut album in March 2017.

Eighteen artists have spent six or more weeks at the top of the Classical Artist Albums Chart during the 2010s. The totals below include only credited performances.

| Artist | Number-one albums | Weeks at number one |
|---|---|---|
| André Rieu | 15 | 142 |
| The Johann Strauss Orchestra | 7 | 55 |
| Ludovico Einaudi | 6 | 93 |
| Craig Ogden | 4 | 19 |
| Aled Jones | 5 | 31 |
| Alexander Armstrong | 1 | 17 |
| Nicola Benedetti | 2 | 11 |
| David Parry | 1 | 11 |
| London Philharmonic Orchestra | 1 | 11 |
| Rhydian Roberts | 1 | 10 |
| Katherine Jenkins | 6 | 11 |
| Russell Watson | 2 | 10 |
| Sheku Kanneh-Mason | 1 | 14 |
| Andrea Bocelli | 1 | 24 |
| Central Band of the RAF | 1 | 6 |
| The Sixteen | 2 | 6 |
| Harry Christophers | 2 | 6 |
| Ennio Morricone | 2 | 6 |

=== By record label ===
Twenty one record labels have released chart-topping albums during the 2010s.

| Record label | Number-one albums | Weeks at number one |
|---|---|---|
| East West | 1 | 17 |
| Cavendish | 1 | 1 |
| Erato | 1 | 1 |
| Mercury Classics | 2 | 3 |
| Rambling Rose | 1 | 1 |
| Warner Bros. | 1 | 2 |
| Futura Classics | 1 | 10 |
| Classic FM | 8 | 26 |
| Decca Records | 62 | 290 |
| Deutsche Grammophon | 6 | 10 |
| Motif Records | 2 | 7 |
| Philips Records | 1 | 2 |
| Sony Classical | 10 | 25 |
| Sugar Music | 1 | 1 |
| CORO | 1 | 2 |
| WEA Records | 5 | 7 |
| X5 Music Group | 1 | 11 |
| Sony Masterworks | 1 | 3 |
| Global | 1 | 3 |
| BMG | 2 | 6 |
| Channel Classics | 1 | 1 |
| Domino | 1 | 1 |

== See also ==
- List of UK Albums Chart number ones of the 2010s
