= Rhydian Roberts discography =

Welsh singer Rhydian Roberts

- Studio albums: 8
- Compilation albums: 1
- Singles: 5

The discography of Welsh singer Rhydian Roberts consists of eight studio albums, one greatest hits compilation and three singles. His eighth album was released in February 2023, and became his second album to top the UK Classical Albums Chart (after One Day Like This).

== Studio albums ==
Title	Details	Peak chart positions		Sales	Certifications
Title	Details	UK	IRE	Sales	Certifications
Rhydian	Released: 24 November 2008; Label: Sony BMG; Format: CD, digital download	3	7	UK: 406,000; Worldwide: 600,000	BPI: Platinum
O Fortuna	Released: 30 November 2009; Label: Sony Music; Format: CD, digital download	25	61	UK: 100,000	BPI: Gold
Waves	Released: 1 August 2011; Label: Conehead; Format: CD, digital download	39	—		
Welsh Songs: Caneuon Cymraeg	Released: 12 December 2011; Label: Conehead; Format: CD, digital download	—	—		
One Day Like This	Released: 14 April 2014; Label: Futura Classics; Format: CD, digital download	19 (Note: Topped the UK Classical Albums Chart for 10 weeks)	—		
Carry The Fire (Rugby Songs & Anthems)	Released: 13 October 2015; Label: Futura Classics; Format: CD, digital download	—	—		
The Long Road	Released: 12 September 2017; Label: Futura Classics; Format: CD, digital download	—	—		
Classical Album - Hymns, Songs & Arias	Released: 24 February 2023; Label: Futura Classics; Format: CD, digital download	— (Note: Topped the UK Classical Albums Chart)	—		

=== Compilation albums ===
Title	Album details	Peak chart positions		Certifications
Title	Album details	UK	IRE	Certifications
The Very Best Of My LIfe	Released: 14 February 2025; Label: Futura Classics; Formats: CD, digital download	—	—	

== Singles ==
Year	Song	Chart positions	Album
Year	Song	UK	Album
2008	The Impossible Dream	91	Rhydian
2010	The Prayer (with Classical Relief for Haiti)	—	Charity single
2011	Parade	—	Waves
2014	The Pear Fisher's Duet	—	One Day Like This
2015	Forever Young	—	Non-album single

== Guest appearances ==
Title	Year	Other artists	Album
You'll Never Walk Alone	2011	The Morriston Orpheus Choir	To Where You Are
Stars	2011	The Morriston Orpheus Choir	To Where You Are
Bui Doi	2011	The Morriston Orpheus Choir	To Where You Are
Delilah	2015	Compilation	Wales In Union 2015
The Sound of Christmas	2016	Mary-Jess	Prayer to a Snowflake
