= Rhydian =

Rhydian may refer to:

- Rhydian (given name)
- Rhydian Roberts, British singer and actor
  - Rhydian (album), an album by the singer
