= Donnie Demers =

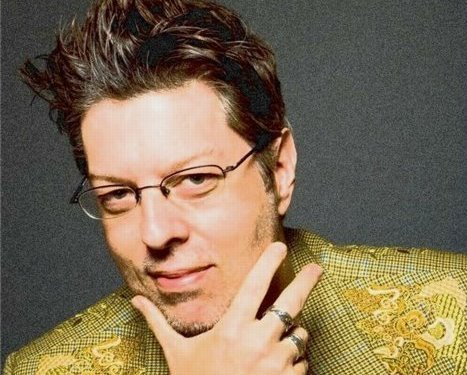
- Donnie Demers

Background information
- Also known as: Donnie Demers
- Born: Donald George Demers; December 20, 1959; Worcester, Massachusetts, U.S.
- Origin: Los Angeles, California
- Died: December 22, 2025 (aged 66) Shrewsbury, Massachusetts
- Genre: Pop
- Occupations: Composer, songwriter, singer, record producer
- Instruments: Piano, Keyboards
- Years active: 1982–2025

Donnie Demers (December 20, 1959 – December 22, 2025) was an American musician and multi-platinum selling songwriter. Donnie's songs have been recorded and performed by various artists from around the world, including Amir Haddad and Joanna Forest.

== Life and work ==
Born with muscular dystrophy and raised in Worcester, Massachusetts, Donnie began playing the piano when he was just four years old. His first taste of "show biz" was during his apprenticeship as Poster child for the Muscular Dystrophy Association for the state of Massachusetts. He attended Doherty Memorial High School, where his interests in songwriting began to flourish and furthered his musical studies at the University of Arizona.

In 1982, Donnie made his first national television appearance on the "Jerry Lewis MDA Telethon" broadcast. He performed his song, "If We Fell in Love Again," receiving a standing ovation that prompted Jerry Lewis to hold an unscheduled interview with the young composer.

In 1983, producers of the Jerry Lewis Telethon commissioned Donnie to write their national jingle promoting the annual Labor Day broadcast. That jingle, "Labor Day Is America's Day (for MDA)" premiered over television and radio stations nationwide from 1983 to 1984 during pre-Telethon promotion.

In 1992, Donnie's song, "Second Chance" appeared in the film "Double Trouble" directed by John Paragon and starred David Paul, Peter Paul, Roddy McDowall and David Carradine. The song was performed by Donnie and Pepper MaShay.

On October 11, 2007, Donnie was a special guest artist at the closing ceremony of the 2007 Special Olympics World Summer Games at Jiangwan Stadium in Shanghai, China, where he performed and premiered his original composition, "Benediction (Let The Best of You Go Free)" written especially for the 2009 World Winter Games of the Special Olympics

In 2008, Donnie Demers appeared as arranger, art director, composer, executive producer, package designer, pianist and vocal producer on the Concord Records release of the debut album "Dream a Little" by his brother Jimmy Demers. This was the first major record label that the brothers worked on together.

In February 2009, Donnie Demers performed "Benediction (Let the Best of You Go Free)", the theme song that he wrote for the 2009 Special Olympics World Winter Games in Boise, Idaho. He performed the song with his brother Jimmy, along with a full orchestra and choir live at the Ford Idaho Center for the opening ceremonies. The Demers brothers also performed Over the Rainbow at the closing ceremonies."

On September 27, 2014, Donnie's song, "Save Your Love For Me" premiered in Calgary, Alberta, Canada, at the 2014 David Foster Foundation Miracle Concert under the musical direction of David Foster. Donnie (who attended the event) was introduced to the audience by Foster.

On April 22–25, 2015, Donnie's song, "Inspire the World" (co-written by Terry Coffey) was featured throughout the FIRST Robotics Competition in St Louis, Missouri at Edward Jones Dome. The song was commissioned by the founders of 'FIRST' Dean Kamen and Woodie Flowers. Donnie and his brother Jimmy Demers performed the song at the opening ceremony.

On April 29, 2016, Donnie's song, "Broken Heart" (co written by Benoit Poher) was released on the second studio album Au cœur de moi (English: At the Heart of Me) from French-Israeli singer Amir Haddad through Warner Music Group. The album was certified 2× Platinum earning Donnie a Double Platinum award and as of September 2018, it has been certified triple platinum in France, gold in Switzerland and gold in Belgium.

On March 10, 2017, Donnie's original song, "My Everything" was released by British soprano Joanna Forest on her debut album, Stars Are Rising – The track was recorded in Prague with the City of Prague Philharmonic Orchestra. The album went to number one on iTunes where Donnie's song landed in the No. 1 position digitally. The album has also hit No. 1 on List of Classical Artist Albums Chart number ones of the 2010s

== Proclamation ==
- 1983 September 5, "Donnie Demers Day" in the city of Worcester, Massachusetts present by Mayor Sara Robertson for rising to "inspirational heights as a composer, lyricist and musician.
