= X5 Music Group =

Swedish record label

- Parent company: Warner Music Group
- Founded: 2003, Stockholm, Sweden
- Founder: Johan Lagerlöf; Daniel Bäckström; Stefan Enberg; Jan Nordlund
- Status: Active
- Distributor: Warner Music Sweden
- Genre: Various (classical, jazz, blues, folk, rock, pop)
- Location: Stockholm, Sweden; Empire State Building, New York City, United States
- Official website: X5MusicGroup.com

X5 Music Group is a record label based in Stockholm, Sweden with a branch in Manhattan, New York. Founded in 2003, it is a digital-only label that primarily licenses pre-existing music for compilation albums. X5 originally focused on classical music, and in 2011 its custom album The Greatest Video Game Music, featuring the London Philharmonic Orchestra, debuted at #23 on the Billboard 200. Since 2009 the company has had 24 albums on the chart; all 24 were custom digital releases produced by the label.

They have a partnership with Universal Music Group called U5, which releases approximately 50 digital compilation albums per month. In 2013, X5 was named one of the Red Herring "Top 100 Most Innovative Companies in Europe.

In June 2016, X5 was acquired by Warner Music Group.

== History ==
=== Founding, business model ===
X5 Music Group was founded in Stockholm, Sweden in 2003 by Johan Lagerlöf, Daniel Bäckström, and Stefan Enberg. All three founders had pre-existing connections in the music industry. CEO Lagerlöf, for example, had previously co-founded companies such as Mobilehits, Scandinavia's the most popular music site, and was also a songwriter/producer for Stockholm Records.

X5 was created with the mutual vision of being digital-only. Classical music was chosen as a focus; many classical compositions are in the public domain. They also gained access to the catalogs of about 50 other companies, mostly independent classical labels in Europe, and repacked them into what The Wall Street Journal called "like classical mix-tapes."

X5's producers partly focus on sales data to determine what should go into compilations, paying mind to keywords and SEO. The New York Times stated "To attract classical neophytes, X5’s collections have search-engine-friendly titles and simple, self-explanatory cover art." Accordingly, compilations often have titles such as The Most Essential Classical Music for Your Baby and Classical Music for Hipsters. On May 26, 2008, X5 released The 50 Most Essential Pieces of Classical Music. The album cost about $150 to compile, and by April 2013 had brought in $3.4 million in revenue.

=== The 50 Greatest Pieces of Classical Music ===
The 50 Greatest Pieces of Classical Music compilation includes selections performed by the London Philharmonic Orchestra under the direction of David Parry, with soloists such as pianist Finghin Collins. According to Allmusic, "While the term 'greatest' may be debatable in the instance of some of the pieces, 'popular' is a description that's easier to support, for there's no denying the staying power of these pieces."

It was #1 on iTunes' Classical Albums chart for over a year, and remained in the iTunes Classical Top 10 for over three years, selling more than 200,000 copies.

=== Expansion ===
X5 expanded into the United States in 2009, setting up an office in the Empire State Building in Manhattan, New York. Former Amazon and eMusic music executive Scott Ambrose Reilly was hired as North American CEO. Noelle Bell was also hired as an account manager.

X5 continued to expand its catalog of compilations, and in 2010 had 13 titles on the Billboard Year End Top 50, tying for the top spot with Universal Music Group. In August 2011 The 99 Most Essential Chopin Masterpieces was ranked No. 1 on Amazon MP3's classical bestsellers chart. The compilation stayed among the chart's top 100 for 20 months.

In 2011 X5 was the No. 2 classical music label on the US charts, second only to Universal.

Also in 2011 the label began branching into genres such as folk, bluegrass, blues, and jazz. They began forming partnerships with non-classical labels such as Sun Records, whose back catalog included artists such as Johnny Cash and Jerry Lee Lewis.

=== The Greatest Video Game Music ===
In November 2011 X5 released one of its most successful albums, The Greatest Video Game Music, performed by the London Philharmonic Orchestra and produced by Andrew Skeet. The twenty-one track set features classical orchestrations of video game themes such as Super Mario Bros., Call of Duty, Final Fantasy, World of Warcraft, and Angry Birds. It debuted at #23 on the Billboard 200 - the highest debut for an orchestral release since 2005's Star Wars Episode III soundtrack. It received praise from IGN and was named "weirdest hit album" of 2011 by Rolling Stone. A sequel was released in October 2012.

=== Classify app ===
In early 2012 X5 launched Classify, an app created through a partnership with Spotify that helps music browsers discover classical music. The software was downloaded 500,000 times in the first month, and X5 released statistics saying Classify brought sales of The 50 Greatest Pieces of Classical Music up by 50%, helping it to top the iTunes classical chart. In May 2013, X5 announced Spotify apps for world music, blues, and jazz to be released in August. In March 2015, Spotify discontinued support for apps in their players, including Classify.

=== U5 partnership ===
“A few years ago we were flipping through the charts and we said, ‘My God, who are these guys?’ What they're doing is disruptive, so we decided to partner with them and innovate rather than fight them.”
— Ross Foster, Universal's VP of commercial affairs

In its early years, X5 drew mainly from the catalogs of independent classical labels. In its first year of operations in the United States they licensed labels such as Cooking Vinyl, Alligator Records, and the Welk Music Group, also commissioning its own recordings. X5 announced in April 2013 that it had started U5, a joint venture with the music conglomerate Universal Music Group. It gave X5 access to over 50,000 of Universal's classical tracks, and another 50,000 jazz and blues songs.

U5 produces digital compilation albums, curating and releasing more than 50 per month. The first slate of releases included expansions to the 50 Greatest series, adding The 50 Greatest Violin Pieces by Joshua Bell, The 50 Greatest Piano Pieces by Lang Lang and The 50 Greatest Performances of Classical Music. Later releases focused on jazz and blues, including artists such as Miles Davis, John Coltrane, and Thelonious Monk.

X5 also partners with Universal Music on the Spinnup distribution platform for unsigned artists.

=== Recent years ===
In April 2013 The New York Times stated that "X5’s techniques are now widely imitated, and its profit margins are the envy of any record label." At that time the company had sold over 230 million downloads internationally, and was putting out several thousand albums a year. As of summer 2013, X5 had a catalog of 8,000 albums, with about 50% of those being titles custom produced by the company. From 2009 to 2013 X5 had 24 albums on the Billboard 200; all 24 were custom digital releases produced by X5.

X5 was named one of the Red Herring "Top 100 Most Innovative Companies in Europe" in 2013.

== Label partners ==
The following is a list of labels and licensing companies that have partnerships with X5 Music Group:

- Alligator Records (blues)
- ARC Music (world, folk)
- BIS Records (classical)
- Cooking Vinyl (modern folk, rock, etc.)
- EMI Music
- HHO Multimedia
- Glyndebourne (London Philharmonic)
- Nacional Records (world)
- Sun Records (R&B, folk)
- Six Degrees Records (world)
- Luaka Bop (world, etc.)
- ONErpm (distribution)
- Universal Music Group
  - Blue Note (jazz)
  - Decca Records (classical)
  - Deutsche Grammophon (classical)
  - Spinnup (unsigned artists)
  - Welk Music Group (world)
- Warner Music Group (parent label; all genres)

== Selected discography ==
Cat. #	Artist	Title	Notes	Year
	London Philharmonic Orchestra/David Parry	The 50 Greatest Pieces of Classical Music	#1 for 3 weeks on Classical Albums Chart	2009
X5CD101	Carola Häggkvist	Elvis, Barbra & jag	#1 on charts in Sweden	2011
	Various	The 99 Most Essential Chopin Masterpieces	#1 on Amazon MP3's Classical Best-sellers	2011
	Jo Stafford	'A' You're Adorable	#1 on charts in Sweden	2011
X5CD114	London Philharmonic Orchestra	The Greatest Video Game Music	#23 debut on Billboard 200 #1 on iTunes' Classical Albums chart for 1+ year	2011
X5CD118	London Philharmonic Orchestra	The Greatest Video Game Music II		2012
	Bond	Play	#94 on the ARIA Charts	2012
	Darin Zanyar	"Nobody Knows"	#1 on Swedish DigiListan Chart	2013
	Darin Zanyar	So Yours	#32 on Belgium Ultratip 100 Chart	2013
	Orphei Drängar, Myrra Malmberg	The Greatest Video Game Music III : Choral edition		2016

== See also ==
- List of Classical Artist Albums Chart number ones of the 2010s
