= The Greatest Video Game Music =

Greatest Video Game Music

Compilation album by London Philharmonic
- Released: 2011
- Genre: Classical, video game music
- Label: X5 Music Group
- Producer: Andrew Skeet

London Philharmonic chronology
Greatest Video Game Music (2011)	The Greatest Video Game Music 2 (2012)

The Greatest Video Game Music, performed by the London Philharmonic Orchestra, features classical orchestrations of video game themes including those from Super Mario Bros., Call of Duty, Metal Gear Solid, Final Fantasy, Halo, World of Warcraft, Angry Birds and many more. A sequel, The Greatest Video Game Music 2, was released a year later.

== Reception ==
It was named Rolling Stone's "weirdest hit album" of 2011, and debuted at #23 on the Billboard 200 - the highest debut for an orchestral release since 2005's Star Wars: Episode III – Revenge of the Sith soundtrack.

== Track listing ==
1. Advent Rising: Muse
2. Legend of Zelda: Suite
3. Call of Duty: Modern Warfare 2 Theme
4. Angry Birds: Main Theme
5. Final Fantasy VIII: Liberi Fatali
6. Super Mario Bros.: Themes
7. Uncharted: Drake's Fortune: Nate's Theme
8. Grand Theft Auto IV: Soviet Connection
9. World of Warcraft: Seasons of War
10. Metal Gear Solid 2: Sons of Liberty Theme^{[A]}
11. Tetris Theme (Korobeiniki)
12. Battlefield 2: Theme
13. The Elder Scrolls IV: Oblivion^{[B]}
14. Call of Duty 4: Modern Warfare Main Menu Theme
15. Mass Effect 2: Suicide Mission^{[C]}
16. Splinter Cell: Conviction
17. Final Fantasy: Main Theme
18. BioShock: The Ocean on His Shoulders
19. Halo 3: One Final Effort
20. Fallout 3: Theme
21. Super Mario Galaxy: Gusty Garden Galaxy
22. Dead Space: Welcome Aboard the U.S.G. Ishimura [Amazon Exclusive]
23. Final Fantasy XIII: Hanging Edge [iTunes Exclusive]
24. Enemy Zero: The Last Movement [bonus track]

== Sequels ==
=== Greatest Video Game Music 2 ===
- Greatest Video Game Music 2, performed by the London Philharmonic Orchestra, features classical orchestrations of video game themes including those from Assassin's Creed, The Elder Scrolls V: Skyrim, Final Fantasy, Halo, Portal and many more. It is a sequel to the compilation album Greatest Video Game Music.

==== Track List ====
1. Assassin's Creed: Revelations: Main Theme
2. The Elder Scrolls V: Skyrim: Far Horizons
3. The Legend of Zelda: The Wind Waker: Dragon Roost Island
4. Final Fantasy VII: One-Winged Angel
5. Mass Effect 3: A Future for the Krogan / An End Once and for All
6. Halo: Never Forget / Peril
7. Sonic the Hedgehog: A Symphonic Suite
8. Chrono Trigger: Main Theme
9. Luigi's Mansion: Main Theme
10. Kingdom Hearts Birth by Sleep: Fate of the Unknown
11. Super Metroid: A Symphonic Poem
12. Diablo III: Overture
13. Batman: Arkham City: Main Theme
14. Deus Ex: Human Revolution: Icarus Main Theme
15. Fez: Adventure
16. Portal: Still Alive
17. LittleBigPlanet: Orb of Dreamers (The Cosmic Imagisphere)

=== Greatest Video Game Music III: Choral Edition ===
- Greatest Video Game Music III: Choral Edition, performed by Orphei Drängar and Myrra Malmberg, features classical orchestrations of video game themes including those from Assassin's Creed, The Elder Scrolls V: Skyrim, Final Fantasy, God of War III, Minecraft and many more. It is a sequel to the compilation album Greatest Video Game Music 2.

==== Track List ====
1. Final Fantasy X - Hymn of the Fayth
2. World of Warcraft - Invincible
3. Skyrim - Age of Oppression
4. Final Fantasy X - Hymn of the Fayth (Remix 1)
5. Dragon Age Inquisition - Main Theme
6. God of War 3 - Anthem of the Dead
7. The Last of Us - The Choice
8. Skyrim - Dragonborn
9. Final Fantasy X - Hymn of the Fayth (Remix 2)
10. Portal - Still Alive
11. Portal 2 - Cara Mia Addio
12. Assassin's Creed IV - The Parting Glass
13. Minecraft - Sweden

== Notes ==
- A "Metal Gear Solid 2: Sons of Liberty Theme" is mislabeled "Metal Gear Solid: Sons of Liberty Theme" on the back cover
- B "The Elder Scrolls IV: Oblivion" is mislabeled "Elder Scrolls: Oblivion" on the back cover
- C "Mass Effect 2: Suicide Mission" is mislabeled "Mass Effect: Suicide Mission" on the back cover
- D The track "Battlefield 2: Theme" is actually a re-orchestration of the Battlefield 1943 main menu music, itself a remake of "Battlefield 1942 Soundtrack–Main Theme" by Joel Eriksson, to whom the song on the album is credited.
