= One Day Like This (disambiguation) =

"One Day Like This" is a 2008 song by Elbow.

One Day Like This may also refer to:

- One Day Like This (album), by Rhydian Roberts, 2014
- "One Day Like This" (Doctors), an episode of the British soap opera, 2024
- "One Day Like This" (Grey's Anatomy), an episode of Grey's Anatomy, 2018
