= Rhydian (given name) =

- Gender: Male

Origin
- Origin: Welsh

Other names
- Related names: Rhydwyn

Rhydian is a male given name of Welsh origin. Notable people with the given name include:

- Rhydian Cowley (born 1991), Australian race walker
- Rhydian Roberts (born 1983), Welsh baritone singer, television presenter and musical theatre actor
- Rhydian Vaughan (born 1988), Taiwanese-Welsh actor
