= Alison Stephens =

English classical mandolinist

- Born: 1 March 1970; Bickley, Kent
- Died: 10 October 2010 (aged 40)
- Genres: Classical
- Occupation: Musician
- Instrument: Mandolin
- Years active: 1987-2010
- Label: Chandos Records
- Website: Alisonstephens.com

Alison Stephens (1 March 1970 – 10 October 2010) was an English classical mandolin player and film musician.

== Biography ==
Stephens was born in Bickley, Kent, and educated at James Allen's Girls' School and Haileybury and began playing the mandolin at the age of seven, inspired by her father, who had played the instrument during the Second World War. She was the first graduate in the instrument from Trinity College of Music in London. She gave her first public performance of a concerto at the Barbican Hall in 1987 and subsequently gave recitals all over the world. She played for opera and ballet companies and was a performer on the scores of films such as The Queen, The Golden Compass, Captain Corelli's Mandolin and Fantastic Mr. Fox.

== Death ==
Stephens was diagnosed with cervical cancer in 2008, and was treated at Addenbrooke's Hospital in Cambridge. After undergoing a second round of treatment in 2009 with a new form of radiation therapy, tomotherapy, she made a full recovery and spent much of the last two years of her life fundraising for cancer charities. In June 2010, the cancer returned and she died at the Arthur Rank Hospice in Cambridge on 10 October that year.

== Discography ==
- Souvenirs for Mandolin and Guitar (2009) with Craig Ogden (guitar)
- Calace Concertos Nos.1 and 2 (2007) with Steven Devine (piano)
- Tapestry (2003) with Lauren Scott (harp)
- Con Espressione (2004)
- Mandolin Concerto in G (2001)
- Music from the Novels of Louis de Bernières (1999) with Craig Ogden (guitar)
- Music for Mandolin (1991)
