= Jimmy Demers =

American singer-songwriter

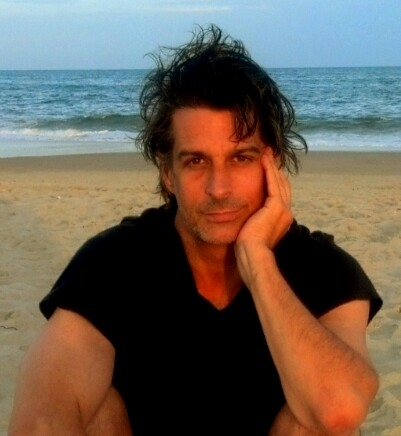
- jimmy

Background information
- Also known as: Jimmy Demers
- Born: James Demers
- Origin: Los Angeles, California, U.S.
- Genre: Pop
- Occupation: Singer

Jimmy Demers is an American singer-songwriter, best known as "the original voice" of the "Always Coca-Cola" ad campaign. He is a contributor to The Huffington Post.

Demers was born and raised in Worcester, Massachusetts. He moved to Los Angeles to pursue a career in music and was soon one of the first artists signed by John McClain to Interscope Records. Throughout the 1990s, Demers recorded jingles for many high-profile clients, including Chevrolet, AOL, McDonald's and the groundbreaking worldwide campaign of "Always Coca-Cola". He was a member of an R&B/pop group, Truth Inc.

Demers has traveled widely, singing in, among other venues, Shanghai, where he performed at the closing ceremonies for the Special Olympics World Summer Games, and Versailles. He has been a featured singer to sports organizations in the United States and has sung the U.S. national anthem at the Los Angeles Coliseum, Arthur Ashe Stadium, Dodger Stadium and Chase Field.

Shortly after the 2004 Indian Ocean earthquake and tsunami, Demers, along with other celebrities and high-profile supporters, went to Kuala Lumpur to lend his support to the Force of Nature concert for Tsunami Aid. While in Kuala Lumpur, Demers sang for the King and Queen of Malaysia at the Royal Palace.

Demers has worked with music industry figures Diane Warren, David Foster, Giorgio Moroder and Tim Rice. He has recorded back-up vocals for many artists, including Garth Brooks, Patti LaBelle and Cher. His debut album Dream A Little, produced by Terry Coffey for the Concord Music Group was released to critical praise. His brother Donnie Demers wrote the words and music to several of the songs, including "It's A Lonely World" (which was featured on the Sirius radio show of author Deepak Chopra.)

Paula Abdul has referred to Demers as "the greatest male vocalist in the world" and hosted An evening with Jimmy Demers in Los Angeles. A&M Record's co-founder Herb Alpert, Billie Dee Williams and model Cheryl Tiegs were among those who joined Abdul as Jimmy and Donnie performed to a capacity audience.

Demers has headlined sold-out shows at the Oak Room at the Algonquin Hotel and Lowes Regency Hotel in New York City. He performed at the Sheldonian Theatre in Oxford, England, with Donnie Demers, for The Skoll World Forum Awards. On August 29th, 2025, he performed Ave Maria at the funeral of Judge Frank Caprio held at the Cathedral of Saints Peter and Paul in Providence, Rhode Island.

Demers currently resides in California. He practices Transcendental Meditation.
