= Robert Emery (pianist) =

Pianist, conductor, and music producer

- Born: 22 March 1983 (age 43)
- Origin: Pelsall, England
- Occupations: conductor, Pianist, orchestrator
- Years active: 1997–present
- Website: robertemery.com

Robert Emery (born 22 March 1983) is an English pianist, conductor, music producer and orchestrator. He was born in Pelsall in the West Midlands (UK), began playing the piano as a child, and became known after performing with major artists, including Russell Watson, Meat Loaf, and Stewart Copeland, whilst conducting bare-footed.

== Early life ==
Robert Emery (born 22 March 1983) is an English pianist, conductor and orchestrator. He started playing the piano at the age of seven. Soon he studied with renowned piano professor Heather Slade-Lipkin and won the RBC Concerto competition at age 11 and won the Regional BBC Young Musician competition twice over, as well as reaching the last and best ten pianists in the BBC Young Musician competition. Robert then studied piano at the Royal College of Music with Ruth Nye a pupil of the famed Claudio Arrau and conducting with Neil Thomson, a pupil of the renowned Leonard Bernstein. Since making his London debut when he was thirteen, he has performed internationally as a recitalist and conductor.

== Career ==
=== 2000-2010: Early career and discovery ===
Robert Emery first promoted himself as a young pianist, touring the UK twice aged 18 and 19. He was a guest soloist at the Red Cross Gala Ball at the Guildhall, London. He was also the conductor for a nationwide tour of Milkshake! Live with the British Philharmonic Orchestra.

=== 2010-2020: Musical theatre, concerts, and composing ===
He has been the associate musical supervisor for the world premieres of Dallebach Kari das Musical, Gotthelf das Musical, Der Besuch der Alten Dame das Musical; all in Switzerland. He was also the conductor, director and orchestrator of the Lovebugs/Basel Symphony concerts and the director and orchestrator of the Seven/21st Century Orchestra concerts, both of which were co-produced by one of Emery's businesses, Arts Festivals Ltd. He is also known for conducting and playing bare-foot.

In 2013, he worked with the writers of Les Miserables (Claude-Michel Schonberg and Alain Boublil) to produce Watson's album, Only One Man.

2014 saw Emery work in Los Angeles for the year, including producing the music and performing at the International Women's Media Foundation (IWMF) Awards. One of the tracks performed, written by the multi-platinum writer Donnie Demers and performed by Carly Paoli, was a requiem to Anya Niedringhaus. Emery also worked with Paula Abdul for the event.

In 2015, Emery went on tour with Britain's Got Talent star, Jonathan Antoine, performing in venues across the UK. Later that year, he conducted the Military Wives Choir at the National Television Awards broadcast live on ITV from London’s o2 arena. Three days later, he conducted at the Llangollen Eisteddfod with the National Symphony Orchestra. Emery was also invited to conduct Taiwanese Singer Ji Xiaojun at the Taipei Arena.

In 2017, he performed with Meat Loaf in Toronto, Canada, in front of 25,000 people. In the same year, his first musical as a composer was premiered at a purpose-built theatre on the Rheinfall in Switzerland. With a budget of two million francs, Anna Göldi das Musical. He also produced Joanna Forest's first album, 'Stars Are Rising'. The album shot straight to number one in the Classical Charts.

Together with composer Moritz Schneider, he also composed, produced and conducted the next album from the Swiss singer, SEVEN. The album 4Colors was released on 7 July 2017.

In 2017 Emery worked on the Bat out of Hell musical. He was made musical director and associate musical supervisor of the show, which premiered at the London Coliseum in the summer, following previews at Manchester Opera House earlier in the year. He also took the show to Toronto, Canada to perform at the Ed Mirvish Theatre.

In 2018, Emery was musical director and associate musical supervisor for the West End production of Bat Out Of Hell The Musical.

Emery went into the studio with the Arts Symphonic Orchestra and Arts Voices to record the second album for classical crossover artist Joanna Forest. 'The Rhythm of Life' was recorded at Angel Studios and featured vocals by Forest, Paul Potts and Andy Day.

In 2019 and 2021, he conducted a nationwide tour of NOW That's What I Call Christmas featuring Kerry Ellis and John Owen-Jones.

=== 2020–present ===
In 2020, Emery orchestrated and conducted the Bratislava Symphony Orchestra for a 4D experience film called Rubia. Emery did not perform for the rest of 2020 due to Covid.

In 2021, he conducted a nationwide tour in the UK of The Best of John Williams with the London Concert Orchestra and the Manchester Concert Orchestra. Also in 2021, he produced and presented an online TV series called Classical Connections with Robert Emery. In these episodes, Emery tackles one composer at a time, finds interesting stories from their personal lives, and performs their music (whilst sometimes dressed as the composer). The composers featured include Grieg, Mozart, Gershwin, Beethoven, Rossini, Satie, Berlioz, Bruckner, Strauss, Verdi, Saint-Saens, Brahms and Liszt.

In 2022, he conducted a tour of the music of Zimmer vs Williams with the London Concert Orchestra, which ended at the Barbican London on New Year's Eve. Emery conducted the UK Tour of Bat Out Of Hell again, and when his friend and colleague Meat Loaf died, he did a round of international TV and Radio interviews celebrating his life. He finished off the year conducting the Classical Spectacular in Birmingham Symphony Hall with the London Concert Orchestra and guest soloists Ilona Domnich and Luis Gomes, with the City of Birmingham Choir.

He also produced and presented his second online TV series called Music Trivia with Robert Emery. In the series, he discovers stories about the world of music, including where the Birthday Song came from, what a conductor does, the most expensive music manuscript, who the first ever conductor was, who invented the piano, and an episode about musical toilets.

Finally, in 2022, he produced, orchestrated and conducted the Jubilee Anthem to commemorate Queen Elizabeth II's Platinum Jubilee. This featured vocals by Lesley Garrett, Rodney Earl Clarke and the London Community Gospel Choir.

In 2023 he was named as music director for the National Philharmonic Orchestra of Great Britain. He is also conducting another tour of The Music of Zimmer vs Williams and a tour of Symphonic Universe - The Music of The Avengers and Beyond with The London Concert Orchestra

Emery has also been in Abbey Road Studios this year recording the largest music production for meditations ever made, with over 128 musicians and singers. This music is used in his new project, Orchestral Meditations.

== Charitable work ==
Emery created a philanthropic music education website, Ted's List, during the pandemic lockdown of 2020.

He also set up a registered charity called The Emery Foundation, with its first project being 'Get Musicians Working' - a scheme to raise funds for professional musicians who were financially struggling due to their situation in the covid pandemic.
