= The 50 Greatest Pieces of Classical Music =

Studio album by the London Philharmonic Orchestra
- Released: 2009
- Recorded: Abbey Road Studios; Royal Festival Hall; Henry Wood Hall
- Genre: Classical
- Label: X5 Music Group

Professional ratings
Review scores
Source	Rating
Allmusic	3.5/5 stars

The 50 Greatest Pieces of Classical Music is a compilation of classical works recorded by the London Philharmonic Orchestra with conductor David Parry. Recorded at Abbey Road Studios, Royal Festival Hall and Henry Wood Hall in London, the compilation was released in digital formats in November, 2009 and as a 4-CD set in 2011. The 50 Greatest Pieces of Classical Music has sold over 200,000 copies and spent over three days as one of the top 10 classical albums on iTunes.

== Track listing ==
1. Edvard Grieg – Peer Gynt Suite No. 1 op. 46: Morning Mood
2. Ludwig van Beethoven – Symphony No. 5 in C minor, op. 67, "Fate": I. Allegro con brio
3. Antonio Vivaldi – The Four Seasons, op. 8, "Spring": Allegro
4. Samuel Barber – Adagio for Strings
5. Richard Wagner – The Valkyrie: Ride of the Valkyries
6. Frédéric Chopin – Nocturne No. 2 in E-Flat major, op. 9
7. Johann Pachelbel – Canon in D Major
8. Carl Orff – Carmina Burana: O fortuna
9. Johann Sebastian Bach – Orchestral Suite No. 3 in D major, BWV 1068: Air
10. Gustav Holst – The Planets, op. 32: Jupiter, the Bringer of Jollity
11. Claude Debussy – Suite bergamasque, L 75: Clair de lune
12. Giuseppe Verdi – Nabucco: Chorus of the Hebrew Slaves (Va, pensiero, sull'ali dorate)
13. Wolfgang Amadeus Mozart – Piano Concerto No. 21 in C major, K. 467: II. Andante
14. Johann Sebastian Bach – Brandenburg Concerto No. 3 in G major, BWV 1048: Allegro
15. Jules Massenet – Thaïs: Meditation
16. Antonín Dvořák – Symphony No. 9 in E minor, op. 95, "From the New World": II. Largo
17. Johann Strauss II – On the Beautiful Blue Danube, op. 314
18. Johannes Brahms – Hungarian Dance No. 5 in G minor
19. Pyotr Ilyich Tchaikovsky – Swan Lake Suite, op. 20: Scène
20. Erik Satie – Gymnopédie No. 1
21. Wolfgang Amadeus Mozart – Requiem, K. 626: Lacrimosa dies illa
22. Ludwig van Beethoven – Bagatelle in A minor, WoO 59, "Für Elise"
23. Edward Elgar – Pomp and Circumstance, op. 39: Land of Hope and Glory
24. Georges Bizet – Carmen Suite No. 2: Habanera
25. Ludwig van Beethoven – Symphony No. 9 in D minor, op. 125, "Choral": Ode an die Freude
26. Jacques Offenbach – The Tales of Hoffmann: Barcarolle
27. Remo Giazotto – Adagio in G minor for Strings and Organ (after T. Albinoni)
28. Wolfgang Amadeus Mozart – Serenade No. 13 in G major, K. 525, "Eine kleine Nachtmusik": I. Allegro
29. Gioachino Rossini – The Barber of Seville: Overture
30. Ludwig van Beethoven – Piano Sonata No. 14 in C-sharp minor, op. 27:2, "Moonlight Sonata": Adagio sostenuto
31. Bedřich Smetana – Má vlast (My Fatherland): Vltava (The Moldau River)
32. Luigi Boccherini – String Quintet in E major, op. 13: Minuet (mislabeled – should be op. 11, No. 5 (G. 275): Minuet)
33. Wolfgang Amadeus Mozart – Symphony No. 40 in G minor, K. 550: I. Allegro molto
34. Antonín Dvořák – Slavonic Dance No. 2, op. 72
35. Charles Gounod – Ave Maria (after J.S. Bach)
36. Jean Sibelius – Finlandia, op. 26
37. Wolfgang Amadeus Mozart – Piano Sonata No. 11 in A major, K. 331: Rondo alla turca
38. Wolfgang Amadeus Mozart – The Magic Flute, K. 620: Overture
39. George Frideric Handel – The Messiah, HWV 56: Hallelujah Chorus
40. Edvard Grieg – Peer Gynt Suite No. 1, op. 46: In the Hall of the Mountain King
41. Gabriel Fauré – Pavane
42. Johann Sebastian Bach – Double Concerto in D minor for Two Violins, BWV 1043: Vivace
43. Georges Bizet – L'Arlésienne Suite No. 1: Prelude
44. Johann Strauss I – Radetzky March, op. 228
45. Ludwig van Beethoven – Egmont, op. 84: Overture
46. Stanley Myers – Cavatina
47. Arcangelo Corelli – Concerto Grosso No. 8 in G minor, op. 6: "Christmas Concerto": Allegro
48. Sergei Rachmaninoff – Vocalise, op. 34
49. Giuseppe Verdi – Messa da Requiem: Dies irae - Tuba mirum
50. Gustav Mahler – Symphony No. 5 in C-sharp minor: Adagietto

== Charts ==
Chart (2010–16)	Peak position
Australian Catalogue Albums (ARIA)	36
Belgian Classical Albums (Ultratop Flanders)	16
French Albums (SNEP)	70
Italian Albums (FIMI)	71
UK Albums (OCC)	90
UK Classical Artist Albums (OCC)	1
US Billboard 200	136
US Classical Albums (Billboard)	1
US Independent Albums (Billboard)	21

== Certifications ==
Region	Certification	Certified units/sales
France (SNEP)	Gold	50,000^{‡}
United Kingdom (BPI)	Gold	100,000^{‡}
^{‡} Sales+streaming figures based on certification alone.
