= The Ayoub Sisters =

Musical duo

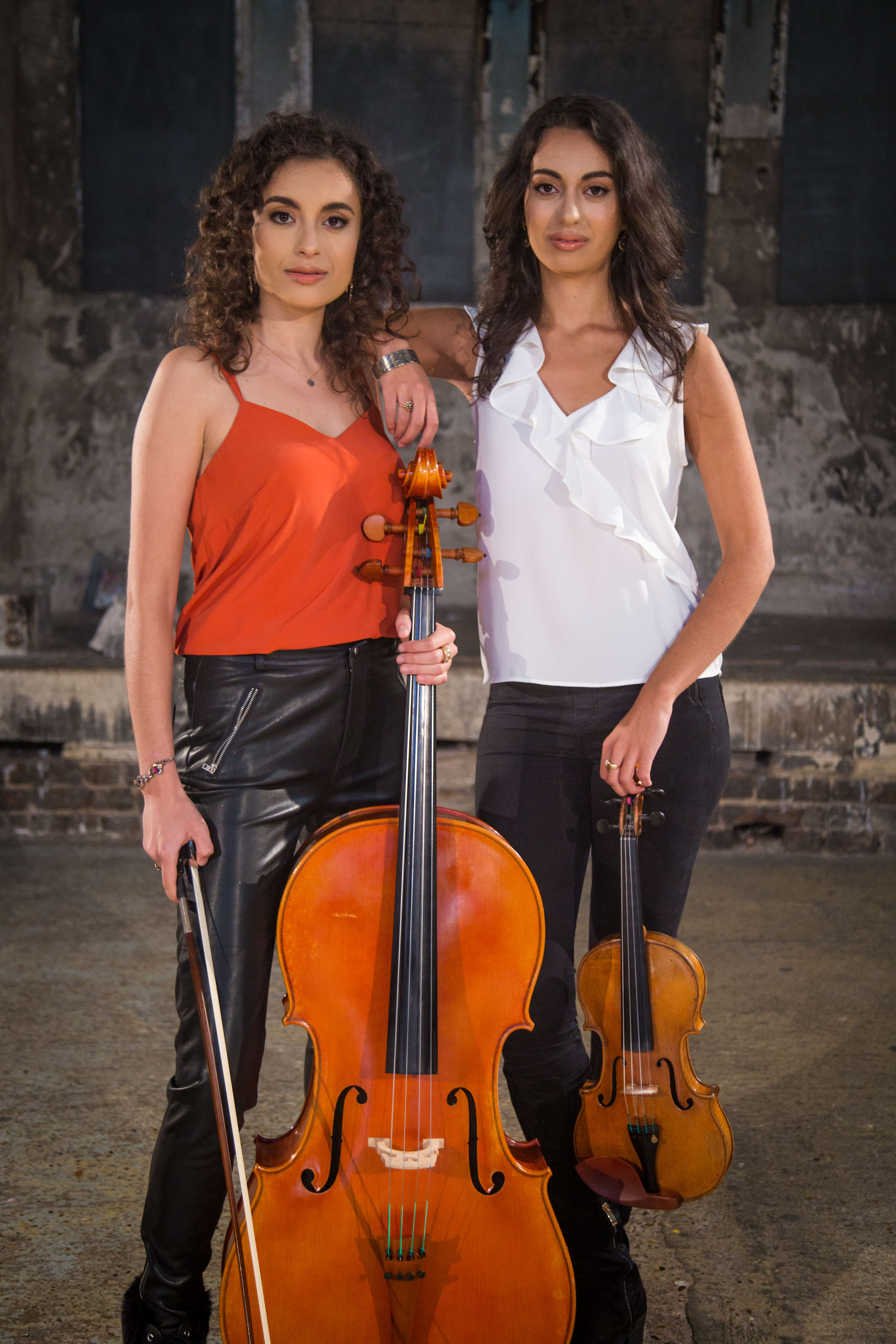
Sarah (cello) & Laura (violin)

The Ayoub Sisters are a multi-instrumental musical duo consisting of siblings Sarah and Laura Ayoub. The duo arrange and perform instrumental versions of well-known pop and classical works. Their debut album was recorded in Abbey Road Studios with the Royal Philharmonic Orchestra in partnership with Classic FM and released on Universal's Decca Records in September 2017. Their self-titled album debuted at No. 1 in the Official Classical Artist Albums Charts. The duo's second album Arabesque, a celebration and tribute to music from the Arab world, was independently released and shot to No. 1 in the iTunes Chart and reached the top 10 in the Official Classical Artists Albums Charts.

== Background ==
The duo were brought to public attention when their instrumental cover of "Uptown Funk" was discovered by record producer Mark Ronson. The sisters were invited to Abbey Road Studios by Ronson to produce a cover of the song, which was showcased as part of the BRIT Awards, 2016. In the same year, The Ayoub Sisters made their Royal Albert Hall debut performing as guest soloists with the Royal Scottish National Orchestra.The concert was broadcast on Classic FM Live and as a result, the sisters were offered a record deal with Decca Records.

== Early life and education ==
The Ayoub Sisters were born in Glasgow to Egyptian immigrant parents. The sisters attended the music school of Douglas Academy. Afterwards, Sarah completed her studies at the Royal Conservatoire of Scotland (2010–2014) and Laura at the Royal College of Music (2013–2017).

The Ayoub Sisters are advocates for music education and have given masterclasses at the newly launched Benedetti Foundation.

The Ayoub Sisters
- Years active: 2015–present
- Members: Sarah Ayoub, Laura Ayoub
- Website: www.theayoubsisters.com

== Performances ==
The Ayoub Sisters have performed internationally across the United Kingdom and Middle East, including performances at the Cairo Opera House. The duo have also toured with Choir Master Gareth Malone. The Ayoub Sisters were requested by HM King Charles III to perform at the Honours of Scotland Coronation service in Edinburgh.

== Television appearances ==
The duo made their television debut performing at the 2017 BAFTA's which was held in The Royal Festival Hall. The Ayoub Sisters played at BBC Proms in the Park in Glasgow accompanied by the BBC Scottish Symphony Orchestra on BBC 1. The duo have also been featured on the BBC Big Sing, Songs of Praise and Sky Arts.

The Ayoub Sisters performed the Egyptian National Anthem at the closing ceremony of the World Youth Forum which was attended by H.E Abdel Fattah el Sisi, the president of the Arab Republic of Egypt. Notably, Laura Ayoub was the strings adjudicator in YMOG 2026, a competition that brings the most talented young musicians around the gulf.

== Awards ==
The Ayoub Sisters are recipients of the World Youth Forum Award and the Arab Woman of the Year Award. The duo's debut album was also nominated for a Classic BRIT Award in 2018.

== Discography ==
- The Ayoub Sisters – Decca (4815780) – (September 2017)
- Arabesque – (2022)
