= The Last Rose =

2011 album by Laura Wright

Studio album by Laura Wright
- Released: 25 July 2011
- Recorded: 2010–2011
- Genres: Classical, folk
- Label: Decca
- Producer: Anna Barry

Singles from The Last Rose
- 1. "The Last Rose of Summer" Released: May 23, 2011

Professional ratings
Review scores
| Source | Rating |
|---|---|
| Allmusic | 3.5/5 stars |

The Last Rose is the debut studio album by contemporary classical vocalist Laura Wright. It was released on 25 July 2011 by Decca Records.

== Idea and arrangement ==
In an interview, Wright said: “These songs have been passed on for generations. I was taught them by my grandmother when I was young but unless we continue that tradition, they will slip into oblivion.” Wright's album includes many classics such as "Scarborough Fair" and "My Bonnie Lies Over The Ocean" alongside basing one track ("Now Sleeps the Crimson Petal") on Alfred Lord Tennyson's poem of the same name. The song is a solo arrangement of Paul Mealor's adaptation of the hymn "Ubi Caritas" which was also performed at the wedding of Prince William and Catherine Middleton.

== Critical reception ==
Overall, the album has received mixed reviews, with The Independent's Andy Gill giving the album a poor review, whilst Simon Gage of the Daily Express called the album "really rather lovely stuff".

== Track listing ==
| No. | Title | Length |
|---|---|---|
| 1. | "The Last Rose of Summer" | 4:33 |
| 2. | "I Know Where I'm Going" | 3:19 |
| 3. | "Scarborough Fair" | 3:02 |
| 4. | "Drink to Me Only with Thine Eyes" | 3:42 |
| 5. | "Blow the Wind Southerly" | 2:49 |
| 6. | "Now Sleeps the Crimson Petal" | 3:10 |
| 7. | "O Waly Waly" | 3:51 |
| 8. | "Skye Boat Song" | 4:44 |
| 9. | "Down by the Salley Gardens" | 4:01 |
| 10. | "The Ash Grove" | 4:31 |
| 11. | "My Bonnie Lies Over the Ocean" | 4:06 |
| 12. | "Lavender's Blue" | 3:36 |

== Chart performance ==
The album topped the UK Classical Charts for five weeks from 31 July 2011. The album charted less successfully in the UK Albums Chart, peaking at number twenty four on 6 August 2011. It fell to 67 the following week, then fell to 71 the week after, before falling to 96 in its fourth week. The album then climbed back up to 69, before dropping out of the UK Top 100 completely after five weeks.

| Chart (2011) | Peak position |
|---|---|
| UK Albums Chart | 24 |
| UK Classical Chart | 1 |

== See also ==
- List of Classical Artist Albums Chart number ones of the 2010s
