= And the Waltz Goes On =

Studio album by André Rieu and Hayley Westenra
- Released: 31 October 2011
- Recorded: 2011
- Genre: Classical
- Label: Decca

And the Waltz Goes On is a studio album by Dutch violinist André Rieu that features Christchurch soprano Hayley Westenra on the last track, "Dreaming of New Zealand".

The album was released worldwide on 31 October 2011. It presents waltzes from around the world, including a "Valse Triste" (sad waltz) from Finland, a miniature waltz "La petite Valse" from France, a popular waltz tune that began life in Germany.

The album is centered on a waltz composed by Welsh actor Anthony Hopkins. The waltz, called "And the Waltz Goes On" was composed by Hopkins in 1964. A fan of the Dutch violinist, Hopkins's wife sent his waltz to Rieu for consideration.

Inspired by New Zealand's stunning landscape and the ‘life must go on’ attitude of its people in the face of the recent natural disasters, André composed a dreamy waltz together with his first violinist Frank Steijns entitled "Dreaming of New Zealand". The album includes both an instrumental version and one with English and Māori lyrics.

The album reached number one on the official UK Classical Charts, as well as the Classic FM chart, after its release in the UK.

On 2 October 2012, The album got the honor of "Classic FM Album Of The Year in association with MasterCard" from Classic Brit Awards 2012.

== Track listing ==
No.	Title	Lyrics	Music	Length
1.	"Grande valse Viennoise"	A. Rieu	A. Rieu, F. Steijns	6:09
2.	"Wien wird bei Nacht erst schön"	W. Sterk	R. Stolz	3:43
3.	"And the Waltz Goes On"		A. Hopkins	5:55
4.	"If You Knew Susie"		B. G. DeSylva	2:36
5.	"Dreaming of New Zealand"	M. Rieu	A. Rieu, F. Steijns	5:14
6.	"Wien bleibt Wien"		J. Schrammel	3:24
7.	"Ich muß wieder einmal in Grinzing sein"		R. Benatzy	3:50
8.	"Tanze mit mir in den Morgen"	K. Hertha	K. Götz	2:50
9.	"La petite valse"	J. Remo, Van Aleda	J. Heyne	2:51
10.	"Are You Lonesome Tonight?"		L. Handman, R. Turk	4:19
11.	"You Can't Be True, Dear"	G. Ebeler, H. Cotten	H. Otten	3:08
12.	"Valse triste"		J. Sibelius	4:38
13.	"Blue Tango"		L. Anderson	3:05
14.	"Singin' in the Rain"	A. Freed	N. H. Brown	4:05
15.	"We'll Meet Again"		H. Charles, R. Parker	2:14
16.	"Waltz Medley"	E. Bader, K. G. Neumann	A. Lortzing, Th. Koschat, R. Arnie, A. Morris	3:38
17.	"Swan Lake"		P. Tchaikovsky	2:52
18.	"Edelweiss"	O. Hammerstein	R. Rodgers	3:05
19.	"The Music of the Night"	C. Hart, R. Stilgoe	A. Lloyd Webber	4:52
20.	"Dreaming of New Zealand"	M. Rieu	A. Rieu, F. Steijns	5:15

== International release ==
Region	Date	Label	Format	Source
International	31 Oct 2011	Decca	CD/DVD	
Australia	31 Oct 2011	Decca	CD/DVD	
UK	7 Nov 2011	Decca	CD/DVD	

== Certification ==
Region	Certification	Sales	Ref
Brazil - ABPD	Platinum	30.000	
