= Waves (Rhydian Roberts album) =

Studio album by Rhydian
- Released: 31 July 2011 (Digital download); 1 August 2011 (CD)
- Recorded: 2010–11
- Genre: Pop, new wave
- Label: Conehead Management

Rhydian chronology
O Fortuna (2009)	Waves (2011)	Welsh Songs: Caneuon Cymraeg (2011)

Waves is the third album by Welsh singer Rhydian. It was released on 1 August 2011 in the United Kingdom. It entered the UK Albums Chart at number 39 on 7 August 2011. The album is a complete departure from Rhydian's first two albums, which were operatic pop to more electronic sound with elements of new wave.

== Track listing ==
No.	Title	Length
1.	"Parade"	3:57
2.	"The Promise"	3:19
3.	"Broken Land"	5:00
4.	"Hands to Heaven"	4:11
5.	"No More "I Love You's""	3:58
6.	"Tower of Strength"	3:53
7.	"Waves"	3:46
8.	"Love Is a Wonderful Colour"	3:48
9.	"The Promise You Made"	3:38
10.	"You're a Big Girl Now"	3:33

== Chart performance ==
Chart (2011)	Peak position
UK Albums Chart	39

== Release history ==
Region	Date	Format	Label
United Kingdom	31 July 2011	Digital download	Conehead Management
United Kingdom	1 August 2011	CD	Conehead Management
