= O Fortuna (album) =

Studio album by Rhydian
- Released: 30 November 2009
- Genre: Classical, pop
- Label: Syco Music

Rhydian chronology
| Rhydian (2008) | O Fortuna (2009) | Waves (2011) |

O Fortuna is the second studio album by Welsh classical singer Rhydian. It was nominated for NS&I Album of the Year. The repertoire ranges over English, Welsh and Latin material, featuring four tracks written by Karl Jenkins, who also produced it. Tracks include collaborations with Kiri te Kanawa and Bryn Terfel.

The album sold 29,784 copies in its first week.

== Track listing ==
1. "O Fortuna" (Carl Orff)
2. "Benedictus" (featuring Kiri Te Kanawa) (Karl Jenkins)
3. "Myfanwy" (featuring Bryn Terfel) (Traditional)
4. "Conquest of Paradise" (Vangelis)
5. "How Great Thou Art" [Nigel Wright's Version] (Stuart K Hine)
6. "The Living Years" (Michal Rutherford; B J Robertson)
7. "Ave Verum Corpus" (Karl Jenkins)
8. "Cantilena" (Adiemus) (Karl Jenkins)
9. "I Won't Let You Walk This Road Alone" (Walter Afanasieff, Jay Landers, Charlie Midnight)
10. "Anthem" (Benny Andersson; Björn Ulvaeus; Tim Rice)
11. "Annie's Song" (John Denver)
12. "Land of My Fathers" (Welsh National Anthem) (Traditional)

== Charts ==
=== Weekly charts ===
| Chart (2009) | Peak position |
|---|---|
| Irish Albums (IRMA) | 63 |
| Scottish Albums (OCC) | 38 |
| UK Albums (OCC) | 25 |

=== Year-end charts ===
| Chart (2009) | Position |
|---|---|
| UK Albums (OCC) | 186 |

== Release history ==
| Region | Date | Format | Label |
|---|---|---|---|
| United Kingdom | 27 November 2009 | Digital download | Syco Music |
| United Kingdom | 30 November 2009 | CD | Syco Music |
