= Craig Ogden =

Australian classical guitarist

- Born: 1967; Perth, Australia
- Genres: Classical
- Occupation: Musician
- Instrument: Classical guitar
- Years active: 1980s-present
- Labels: Chandos Records, Decca Records, Hyperion Records
- Website: craigogden.com

Craig Ogden is an Australian classical guitarist whose albums have topped the UK classical charts. He is Principal Lecturer in Guitar at the Royal Northern College of Music in Manchester, UK.

Ogden began playing guitar at the age of seven, and graduated in music from the University of Western Australia. In 1990 he became UK-based, and has a Professional Performance Diploma from the Royal Northern College of Music, where in 2004 he received a Fellowship from the Royal Northern College of Music, becoming the youngest person to be given the honour. He married the British singer Claire Bradshaw, with whom he often performs; together they founded the Dean & Chadlington Summer Music Festival in 2007. He made his first appearance at the Royal Albert Hall with the Philharmonia Orchestra performing Rodrigo's Concierto de Aranjuez.

== Albums ==
- Tippett: The Blue Guitar (1995)
- Guitar Meditations (1999)
- Music from the Novels of Louis de Bernières (1999) with Alison Stephens (mandolin)
- English Guitar Concertos (2001)
- The Guitarist (2010)
- Summertime (2011)
- A Quiet Thing: Songs for Voice and Guitar (with David Daniels; 2011)
- Christmas Time (2013)
- Summer Guitar (2014)
- Craig Ogden and Friends (2015)
- Love's Philosophy (2017)
