= Stars Are Rising =

Studio album by Joanna Forest
- Released: 10 March 2017
- Recorded: Smecky Studios, Prague 2015, Angel Recording Studios, London 2016, Headline Studios, Cambridge 2016
- Genre: Classical crossover
- Length: 46:04
- Label: Arts Records
- Producer: Robert Emery, Moritz Schneider

Stars Are Rising is the debut album by British soprano Joanna Forest, which was released on 10 March 2017, and went straight to Number One in the Official Classical Album Charts .

== Production ==
The album was recorded in Prague and London with the City of Prague Philharmonic Orchestra and Arts Symphonic Orchestra. It was arranged, conducted and produced by Robert Emery and co-produced by Moritz Schneider on behalf of Arts Festivals.

== Track listing ==
1. "Sposa Son Disprezzata" – 3:39
2. "Un Amore Per Sempre" – 4:30
3. "Life on Mars" – 4:13
4. "How Does It Feel?" – 4:22
5. "My Everything" – 3:52
6. "Don't Quit" – 3:55
7. "May the Lord Bless You and Keep You" – 3:38
8. "Pure Imagination" – 4:34
9. "Out of the Stillness" – 2:26
10. "Il Viaggio" – 4:15
11. "In My Life" – 3:44
12. "Pathways" – 2:52
