= Noah (Noah Stewart album) =

Studio album by Noah Stewart
- Released: March 26, 2012
- Recorded: 2010–11
- Genre: Classical
- Length: 45:55
- Label: Decca

Noah is the debut studio album from American Tenor Noah Stewart. It was released in the United Kingdom on March 26, 2012.

== Reception ==
=== Critical reception ===
The album has so far been well received by critics. Simon Gage of The Daily Express gave the album a positive review stating, "This album couldn’t be a better showcase, mixing classic tracks with contemporary material such as Sting’s "Fields Of Gold" and Leonard Cohen’s "Hallelujah". The voice is flawless and the production pure class while the man himself is something of a major dish into the bargain."

=== Commercial performance ===
The album entered the UK Albums Chart at number 14 on April 1, 2012. It was the second highest new entry that week. He also became the first black artist to top the UK classical album chart. Official Charts Company managing director Martin Talbot says, "This is a truly groundbreaking achievement for Noah Stewart. Most people naturally look to the Singles and Albums charts for the emergence of new talent, but Noah is sure to become a familiar name for years to come following this landmark breakthrough."

== Track listing ==
No.	Title	Length
1.	"Without A Song"	3:27
2.	"Deep River"	2:56
3.	"Recondita Armonia"	2:33
4.	"Campos De Oro" (Fields of Gold)	3:54
5.	"Cara Mia"	3:10
6.	"Hallelujah"	3:29
7.	"Nearer My God to Thee"	3:52
8.	"Shenandoah"	3:31
9.	"Ave Maria"	2:50
10.	"Pourquoi Me Reveiller"	2:31
11.	"Notte Di Luce" (Nights In White Satin)	3:56
12.	"I'll Walk With God"	2:49
13.	"Amazing Grace"	3:24
14.	"Stille Nacht"	3:33

== Chart performance ==
Chart (2012)	Peak position
New Zealand Albums Chart	40
Scottish Albums Chart	18
UK Classical Albums Chart	1
UK Albums Chart	14

== Release history ==
Country	Release date	Format(s)
United Kingdom	26 March 2012	CD, digital download
