= See Siang Wong =

Wong, See Siang
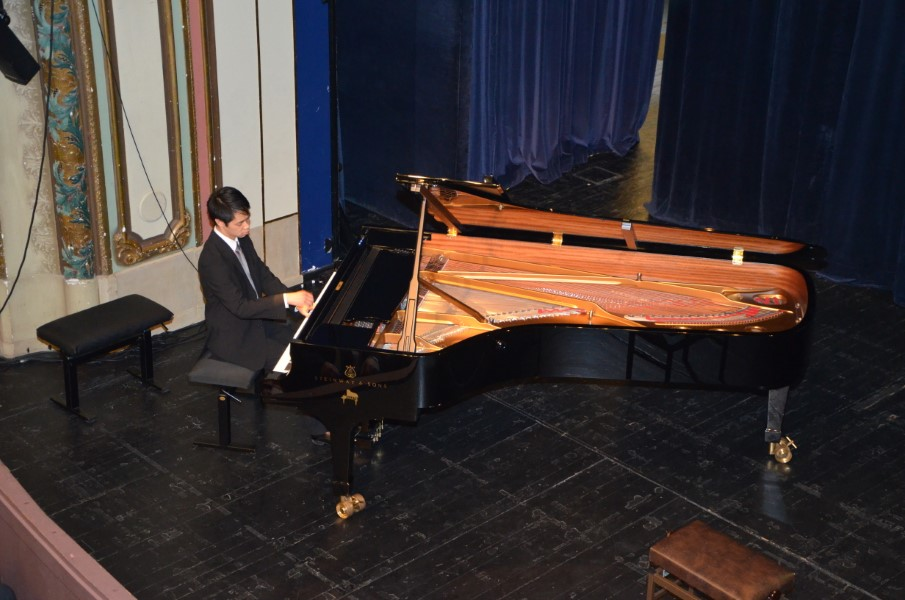
- See Siang Wong during the presentation of the 'Gouden Label 2013'

Background information
- Born: May 7, 1979 (age 46); Arnhem, Netherlands
- Genres: Classical
- Occupation: Pianist

See Siang Wong (Chinese: 黃旭洋; pinyin: huáng xù yáng; born May 7, 1979, in Arnhem, Netherlands) is a Swiss-Malaysian pianist.

Wong's parents, both Chinese, were born in Singapore and Malaysia. Wong studied in the Netherlands with Marjès Benoist and in Switzerland with the pianists Homero Francesch and Bruno Canino. He made his debut at age 12, accompanied by the Dutch Radio Orchestra.

In addition to his performances of standard repertoire, Wong has an interest in contemporary music. In 2008, he initiated the Project "Swiss Piano", in which he is promoting the creation of new piano works. Many Swiss composers have contributed to this project already and dedicated piano pieces to him, including Daniel Fueter, Hans Ulrich Lehmann, Laurent Mettraux, Jürg Wyttenbach, Gérard Zinsstag, and Alfred Zimmerlin.

On the Decca Label (Universal Music Group) Wong has released six albums:

- Chopin: Waltzes and Nocturnes
- Claude Debussy: Early piano works
- Mozart: Piano Sonatas
- Schumann: Piano Works
- Beethoven: Piano Sonatas
- Haydn/Mozart: Piano Concertos).

In 2012, he released his first album on the RCA Red Seal Label (Sony Classical) with piano works of Franz Schubert, which won the Golden Label Award of the Belgian classical critics. His Novalis recordings of concertos by Chopin, Mozart, Schumann and Beethoven were honoured by Swiss Radio with a "Classic Highlight" Award. Wong has also recorded for deutsche harmonia mundi.

Since 2002, Wong has served on the faculty of the Zurich University of the Arts, the youngest faculty member to be appointed to the institute at the time. Outside of music, Wong is a noted cook and food blogger. In 2018 he was the winner of the Swiss TV cooking show Männerküche. He resides in Zurich.

== Recordings ==
| Title | Music | Publisher |
|---|---|---|
| Chopin/Beethoven | Piano Concertos Nos. 1 & 4 (The Chamber Versions) | RCA |
| Piano Movie Lounge 2 | | Sony Classical Records |
| Bach Sons | Piano Concertos and Piano Pieces - Deutsche Harmonia Mundi | Deutsche Harmonia Mundi |
| Piano Movie Lounge | | Sony Classical Records |
| Franz Schubert: Piano Works | Impromptus, D 899, op.90 / Sonata in A Major, D 664 / Allegretto in C Minor, D 915 / Hungarian Melody, D 817 / German Dance, D 366 | RCA |
| Piano Duets | Works of Liste, Schäuble, Honegger, Martin | GUILD |
| Swiss Piano | Swiss Contemporary Piano Pieces | ZHDK Records |
| Haydn/Mozart | Piano Concerto in D Major / Piano Concerto No. 12 in A Major K 414 | Decca |
| Ludwig Van Beethoven | Piano Sonatas: 'Pathétique' / 'Mondschein' / 'Waldstein' / Andante Favori / 'Für Elise' | Decca |
| Schumann/Beethoven | Piano Concerto A-Minor, op. 54 / Piano Concerto No. 6 op. 61a (Piano Arrangement of the Violin Concerto) | Novalis |
| Robert Schumann | 'Papillons', 'Carnaval', 'Kinderszenen', 'Arabeske' | Decca |
| Mozart/Beethoven | Piano Concerto No. 21 in C Major, K. 467 / Piano Concerto No. 3 in C Minor, op. 37 | Novalis |
| Wolfgang A. Mozart | Piano Sonatas K. 283, K. 330, K. 331, and K. 570 | Decca |
| Olivier Messiaen | Oiseaux exotiques | ZHDK Records |
| Emmanuel Nunes | Litanies du feu et de la mer I / II RUDOLF KELTERBORN Klavierstücke 1-6 | GUILD |
| Claude Debussy | Early Piano Works: 'Arabesques', 'Rêverie', 'Ballade', 'Suite Bergamasque', 'Pour le Piano', Mazurka, 'Valse Romantique', 'Estampes' | Decca |
| Frédéric Chopin | Waltzes & Nocturnes: 'Grande Valse brillante', Waltz op.34, op. posth. 64 Nr.1 & 2, op. posth. 69 Nr. 1 & 2, op. posth. 70 Nr. 2, Nocturne op.9, op.15, op.37, op.55, op. posth. | Decca |
| Radio Swiss Classic Collection Vol.5 | Chopin Nocturnes op.9 | Deutsche Grammophon |
| International Festival of Arts: St. Petersburg | Piano music of Louis Durey, Arthur Honegger, Francis Poulenc, Germaine Tailleferre | FOA |
| Radio Swiss Classic Collection Vol.4 | Debussy Valse Romantique | Deutsche Grammophon |
| Klassieke Muziek | Piano music of Joseph Haydn | SMA |
| Solo Voor Enn Kind | Mozart: Piano concerto No. 8, KV 248 | Rose Records |
| Jazz Meets Impressionism | Works for flute and piano by Astor Piazzolla, George Gershwin, Claude Debussy, Luiz Bonfa, Carl Nielsen, Mike Mower | |
| Gioacchino Rossini Petite Messe Solonelle | | Liverpool Records |
| Der Weihnachtsabend | Christmas Carol by Charles Dickens | |
| Nello Santi | Piano Works of Hans von Bülow Kranich Verlag | Zürich |
