= Noah Stewart =

American operatic tenor (born 1978)

Noah Stewart (born 1978) is an American operatic tenor. He released his debut album, Noah, in March 2012; it peaked at number 14 on the UK Albums Chart and number 1 on the UK Classical Album Chart.

== Early life ==
Stewart was born in Harlem, New York. He attended the Fiorello H. LaGuardia High School for the Performing Arts, and subsequently won a scholarship to The Juilliard School. Noah Stewart's musical development started in Harlem, where he studied classical music at The Harlem School of the Arts. At age 12, his choir teacher encouraged him to pursue a music career. He began doing voice-overs for Sesame Street and television school specials and won first place in the New England Music Competition in Boston.

Stewart attended Fiorello LaGuardia High School, where he performed his first opera (La Costanza in amor vince l'inganno). He also sang back-up vocals for pop artists such as Hootie and the Blowfish and Coolio. During this time, Stewart developed a passion for opera, languages, art song, oratorio, musical theater and concert repertoire, and committed himself to pursuing an operatic career. He was recommended by his mentor, the great soprano Leontyne Price, to attend The Juilliard School, where he was awarded a full scholarship.

By the end of his senior year at Juilliard, Stewart was already receiving attention from the professional classical community, was featured in the book Spirit of Harlem by Craig Marberry and Michael Cunningham, and was invited to perform one of the title roles in Acis and Galatea on tour with The Bach Society of Columbia in Germany.

Upon his return to the United States, Stewart was accepted into the San Francisco Opera's prestigious Merola Program, where he was given his first taste of modern opera as The Wizard in Conrad Susa's Transformations. He reprised the role at The Wexford Music Festival that same year. He was subsequently invited to become a San Francisco Opera Adler Fellow, and numerous important debuts soon followed including: T. Morris Chester in the world premiere of Philip Glass's Appomattox; and Malcolm and Macduff in Macbeth, stepping into the latter role with only 15 minutes notice. After graduating from the Adler Fellowship, Stewart made his next modern opera debut as The Prince in the first fully staged production of John Adams's A Flowering Tree with Chicago Opera Theater.

Stewart has been awarded numerous prizes in The Palm Beach Opera, Leontyne Price, George London, Licia Albanese-Puccini Foundation, and Opera Index Competitions. Most recently, he was awarded First Prize in The Mario Lanza Competition for Tenors.

He joined the Metropolitan Opera roster in the fall of 2008.

== Career ==
His US operatic engagements include: the Prince (A Flowering Tree) at Chicago Opera Theater; Cavaradossi, Ismaele, Nadir, Pinkerton and Rodolfo for Michigan Opera Theater; Luigi (Il Trittico) for the Castleton Festival under the baton of Lorin Maazel; Rodolfo with Opera Carolina, The Orlando Philharmonic, Florentine Opera, New Orleans Opera and Nashville Opera; Narraboth at the Arizona Opera; Radames at the Glimmerglass Festival; and the title role in Faust at Atlanta Opera. He has appeared as a featured soloist with North Carolina Opera.

Abroad, he has performed Don Jose in South Africa and at the Royal Albert Hall, Pinkerton at Opera North, and was part of Peter Sellars' acclaimed production of Purcell's Indian Queen at the Teatro Real Madrid, Opera Perm and The Bolshoi Opera. In Spring 2012, he made his Covent Garden debut as Hassan in Judith Weir's Miss Fortune, a role he premiered at the Bregenzer Festspiele in the summer of 2011.

In 2011, he appeared as Lieutenant Pinkerton in Opera North's production of Madama Butterfly, and in 2012 he became the first black musician ever to top the UK Classical Album Chart, when his album Noah reached number one and remained there for 7 weeks. In 2013, he appeared as Don Jose in Royal Albert Hall's production of Carmen sung in English.

Concert performances include his debut with the Birmingham Symphony with an all-Viennese program. He returned to the River Center for the debut of his new show entitled, "So In Love", and made his Scottish Opera debut as Don Jose in Bizet's Carmen. He appeared in BBC Music Ambassador's concert with the Scottish Symphony, and reprised his role as Don Pedro Alvarado in Purcell's Indian Queen at English National Opera (debut), returning to Covent Garden as Pinkerton in Puccini's Madama Butterfly and making his third tour of the United Kingdom, this time in his new show "In Love Again". In 2014 he appeared as part of the Mid-Summer Opera Concert with the Royal Philharmonic Orchestra at Hampton Court Palace, London.

On the concert stage, Stewart has appeared at The Tanglewood, Castleton and Ravinia Festivals, with The John Wilson Orchestra, the Royal Philharmonic Concert Orchestra, the Boston Symphony, the Gulbenkian Orchestra, the Berkeley Symphony, the Manchester Camerata, the Ulster Orchestra and the Royal Liverpool Philharmonic Orchestra. He made his BBC Proms debut in 2012 in Belfast, returning in 2014, in Glasgow.

In February 2015 he was a speaking guest on BBC Radio 4's Midweek programme, telling the story of his career and performing "Amazing Grace". In October 2016, he performed the US National Anthem at the NFL International Series' matchup between the Indianapolis Colts and the Jacksonville Jaguars at Wembley Stadium in London, UK.

== Discography ==
=== Studio albums ===
Title	Album details	Peak chart positions		
Title	Album details	NZ	SCO	UK
Noah	Released: March 26, 2012; Label: Decca Records; Formats: CD, digital download	40	18	14
