= Orphei Drängar =

Swedish male voice choir and singing society

Sångsällskapet Orphei Drängar
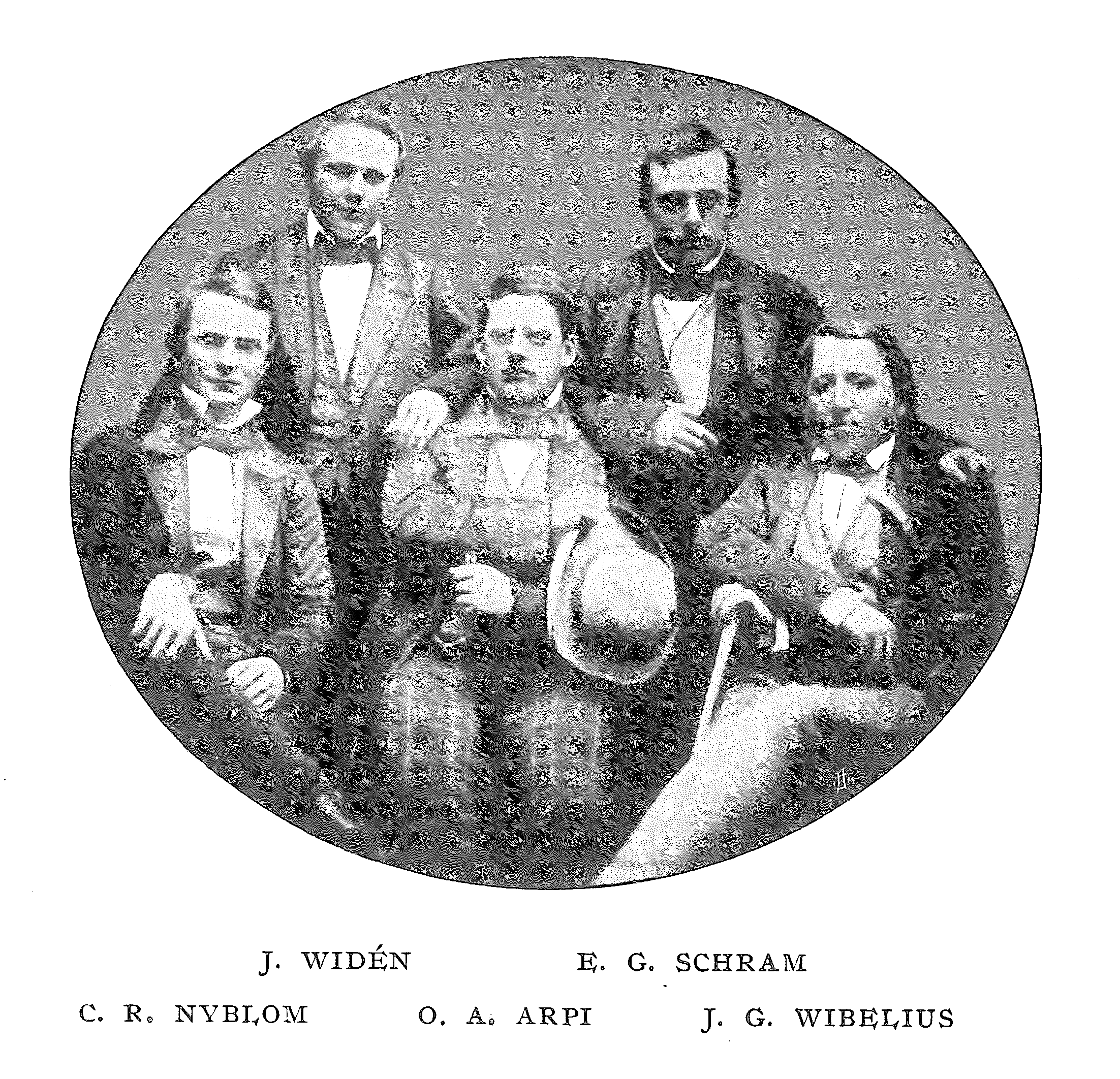
- Photograph from a 1903 publication of Jonas Widén (member no 1), Erik Gustaf Schram (no 3), Carl Rupert Nyblom (no 22), Oscar Arpi (no 11), and Johan Gottfrid Wibelius (no 2)

Background information
- Origin: Uppsala, Sweden
- Years active: 1853–

Sångsällskapet Orphei Drängar (OD) is a Swedish male voice choir and singing society based in Uppsala, Sweden. While best known for its high quality performances of the classical repertoire, OD sings music of all genres in many different languages and since the start in 1853 has been widely acknowledged for its ambition to continuously push the envelope of what a male-voice choir can and should do.

Since 2008, the choir has been conducted by Cecilia Rydinger, in close cooperation with deputy conductor Folke Alin.

== History ==
Orphei Drängar was founded on October 30, 1853, while the city of Uppsala was isolated in an attempt to stop the spread of the cholera epidemic that was then tormenting Sweden. The blockade was successful in that the city more or less came to be spared from the disease, but also had the effect that the students instead felt that they were about to die of boredom. In an attempt to remedy this, first tenor Jonas Widén gathered twelve students (ten singers, a pianist and a spectator) and the conductor Oscar Arpi in a local Banquet Hall, where they passed the time singing together. One of the songs that was performed was Fredman's Epistle No. 14, "Hör, I Orphei Drängar" ("Hear, ye sons of Orpheus") (Note: Orphei means "of Orpheus" in Latin, while drängar is the plural of dräng, "farmhand", in Swedish.) by Carl Michael Bellman, and before the evening was over the singing friends (including the spectator) had formed the Orphei Drängar singing society.

The ambitions rose, as composer Jacob Axel Josephson, since 1849 director musices at the Uppsala university, was recruited as the director of the choir in 1854. The first public performance under the choir's own name took place in 1864, and a yearly tradition with spring concerts started in 1870. OD was by that time an established elite choir, that also performed in Stockholm and in Gothenburg. During the latter half of the 19th century, the choir went on tours abroad to Paris (1867, 1878, 1900), Berlin (1898) and has over the years been performing to audiences in many different parts of the world.

Orphei Drängar made its first recording during a tour to London in 1907 and performed at the Olympic Games in Paris 1924.

== Choir ==
In the 21st century, Orphei Drängar consists of approximately 80 singers. Admission tests are usually carried out in the beginning of September each year.
Yearly recurring concerts are the spring concert in April, the traditional spring song on April 30, with the Caprice concerts in December.

== List of conductors ==
- 1853 – 1854, Oscar Arpi
- 1854 – 1880, Jacob Axel Josephson
- 1880 – 1909, Ivar Eggert Hedenblad
- 1909 – 1910, Wilhelm Lundgren
- 1910 – 1947, Hugo Alfvén
- 1947 – 1951, Carl Godin
- 1951 – 1985, Eric Ericson
- 1985 – 1991, Eric Ericson and Robert Sund (shared conductorship)
- 1991 – 2008, Robert Sund
- 2008 – Present, Cecilia Rydinger Alin

== Discography ==
- 1991 – Christmas Music
- 1992 – Oedipus Rex
- 1993 – OD sings Alfvén
- 1994 – Ett Bondbröllop
- 1996 – The Singing Apes
- 1997 – Våren är kommen
- 1999 – Capricer med OD, part 1 (1964–1969)
- 2000 – Schubert: Male Choruses
- 2001 – Capricer med OD, part 2 (1970–1975)
- 2002 – Capricer med OD, part 3 (1976–1981)
- 2003 – Diamonds
- 2003 – Capricer med OD, part 4 (1982–1986)
- 2004 – Capricer med OD, part 5 (1987–1990)
- 2005 – OD Antiqua
- 2006 – Sounds of Sund
- 2007 – Capricer med OD, part 6 (1991–1995)
- 2009 – Capricer med OD, part 7 (1996–1999)
- 2009 – Capricer med OD, part 8 (2000–2002)
- 2009 – Christmas Songs
- 2011 – Capricer med OD, part 9 (2003 - 2005)
- 2012 – Orphei Drängar
- 2012 – Curse Upon Iron
- 2013 – De Profundis
- 2013 – Capricer med OD, part 10 (2006 - 2008)
- 2016 – The Greatest Videogame Music III – Choral Edition, together with Myrra Malmberg, produced by X5 Music Group
