= Rhydian (album) =

Studio album by Rhydian
- Released: 24 November 2008
- Recorded: 2008
- Genre: Classical, Pop
- Label: Syco, Sony BMG

Rhydian chronology
Rhydian (2008)	O Fortuna (2009)

Rhydian is the self-titled debut studio album by Welsh singer Rhydian, the runner-up on the fourth series of The X Factor. It was released on 24 November 2008.

The album charted at number three on the UK Albums Chart with first-week sales of over 90,000. It was the 29th biggest-selling album of 2008 in the UK and made Rhydian the most successful male solo artist of that year. The album has sold 406,000 copies in the UK as of December 2012.

== Track listing ==
1. "The Impossible Dream"
2. "To Where You Are"
3. "What If (duet with Idina Menzel)"
4. "The Prayer"
5. "Bridge Over Troubled Water"
6. "There Will Be a Time"
7. "Somewhere"
8. "Not a Dry Eye in the House"
9. "I Believe"
10. "I'm Coming Home Again"
11. "Who Wants to Live Forever"

== Charts ==
=== Weekly charts ===
Chart (2008)	Peak position
UK Albums (OCC)	3

=== Year-end charts ===
Chart (2008)	Position
UK Albums (OCC)	29
