= Joanna Forest =

English soprano

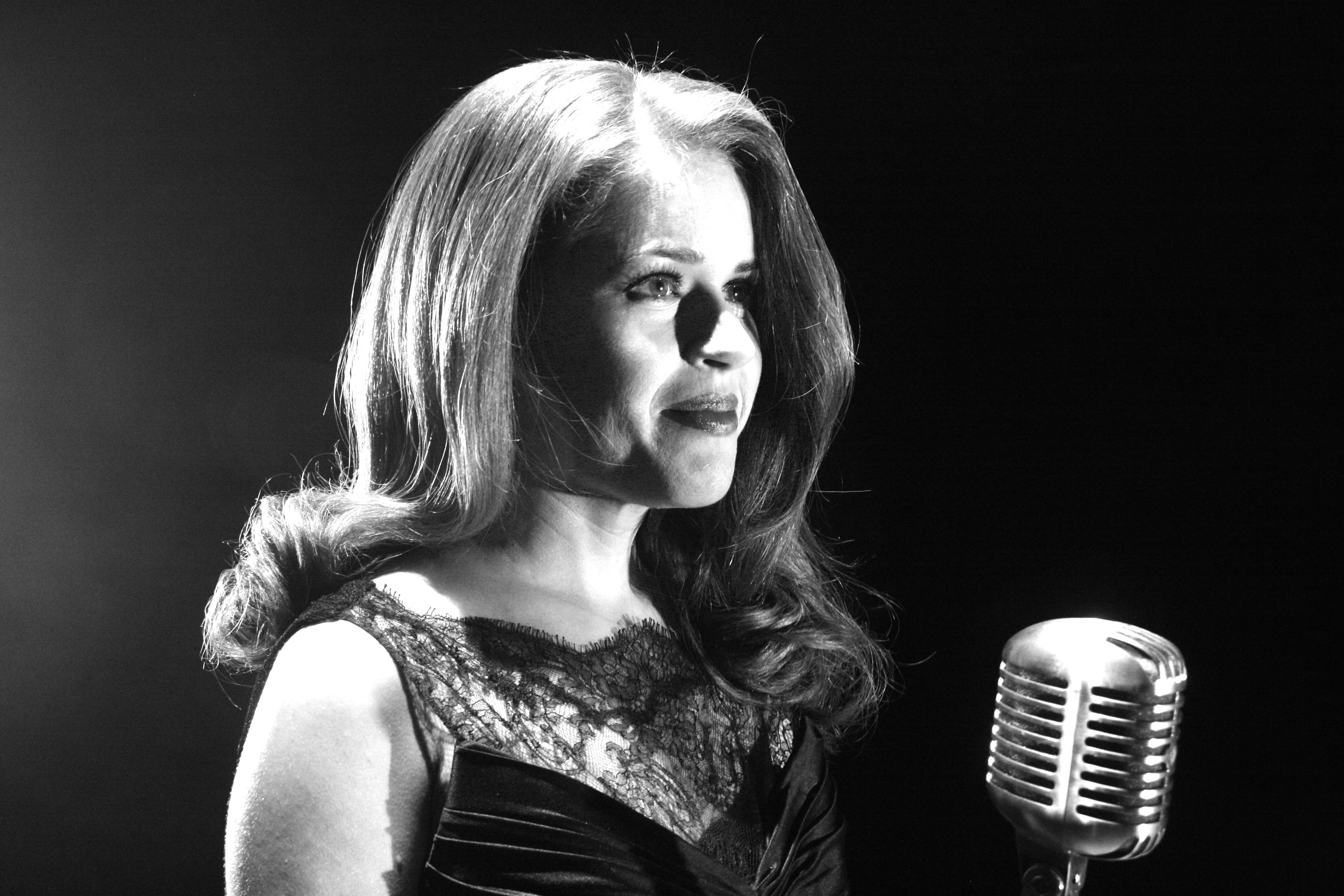
- Born: Loughton, Essex, England
- Education: Italia Conti Academy of Theatre Arts
- Occupation: Singer
- Years active: 1990–present
- Spouse: James Selby (m. 2016)
- Website: joannaforest.com

Joanna Forest is an English soprano.

== Early life ==
Forest trained at The Italia Conti Academy of Theatre Arts.

== Career ==
=== Soprano ===
In 2014, Forest first performed as a solo soprano at Busting to Sing in the West End in aid of breast cancer awareness charity, CoppaFeel! where she also duetted with Paul Potts singing "Point of No Return".

Forest's debut album, Stars Are Rising, which was recorded with the City of Prague Philharmonic Orchestra and Arts Symphonic Orchestra, was released on 10 March 2017 and went straight to number one in the Official Classical Album Chart. This made Forest the first independent classical artist to reach number one with a debut album. The album was produced, orchestrated and conducted by Robert Emery, receiving critical acclaim including "Album of the Week" in The Sunday Mirror and nationwide radio play including Classic FM (UK) and BBC Radio. The first single from the album was a version of Slade's 1975 song "How Does It Feel". This was followed up with a second single, a huge orchestral version of David Bowie's "Life on Mars?".

In summer 2017, Forest performed at Proms events including Bedford Park, Bedford and Castle Howard, the latter of which with Blake. Forest then celebrated the success of the album with a nationwide tour.

To celebrate the 70th wedding anniversary of Queen Elizabeth II and the Duke of Edinburgh, Forest appeared in duet with West End Star, Daniel Koek on a single written by composer, Olga Thomas. The song, entitled "Royal Platinum Love Song" was released in November 2017 and went straight to Number 1 in the iTunes Classical Singles Chart.

In December 2017, Forest was asked to be one of lead vocalists alongside Carol Decker and Michelle McManus on the “Choirs with Purpose” album, Stand Together. Backed by a 600 strong choir from the UK Hospices, she sang a new arrangement of "My Heart Will Go On" gaining significant radio play.

On 1 July 2018 Forest appeared in duet with Mary-Jess Leaverland on Songs of Praise on BBC Television singing "Ave Maria".

Forest's second album, The Rhythm of Life, once again produced by Robert Emery, was released in March 2019 featuring Paul Potts and Andy Day who performs with Forest on first single, Let's Go Fly a Kite. on release, the album went straight to number one in the classical bestsellers Amazon chart and Forest appeared on Sky News, BBC News and in the UK National press promoting the “day in the life of a child” concept that the album took.

In 2020, The Rhythm of Life won "Best Children's Album" at the Clouzine International Music Awards.

Forest dueted with Olga Thomas in the single Flowers On The Doorstep in October 2020 and released a version of the rugby anthem World in Union with pianist Joel Goodman as a charity single in November 2020, in honour of Sgt Matt Ratana, who was fatally shot whilst on duty.

In 2021, she was named as one of the Top 50 Most Influential People in Essex by West Essex Life.

== Pre singing career ==
=== Theatre ===
Prior to launching her career as a classical crossover soprano, Forest spent many years performing both on stage and on television. She made her West End debut at the age of 13, creating the role of Collette in Bernadette the Musical, which ran at the Dominion Theatre. She would perform again at the Dominion several more times appearing in the Royal Variety Performance which was televised for the BBC.

Forest's next West End appearance was at the Strand Theatre, (now renamed Novello Theatre), where she created the role of Charlotte in the play The Weekend, Written by Michael Palin and also starring Richard Wilson, it was produced by Robert Fox and David Pugh Associates, and directed by Robin Lefevre.

Forest played a lead role in the Bill Kenwright production of Dr. Dolittle the musical in 2008/2009, performing alongside Tommy Steele. This production was directed by Bob Tomson and Karen Bruce.

=== Peter Pan ===
Forest has played Wendy Darling in Peter Pan in venues such as The Mayflower, Southampton; The Grand Opera House, Belfast; The New Theatre, Cardiff; Wycombe Swan, High Wycombe; The Nottingham Theatre Royal; The Theatre Royal, Newcastle; The New Victoria Theatre, Woking; Theatre Royal Bath and The Cliffs Pavilion, Southend, performing alongside Shane Richie, Steve McFadden, Joe Pasquale, Paul Nicholas, Leslie Grantham amongst others.

=== Television and film ===
Forest's television work includes The Upper Hand for Central Television, on which she portrayed Katie for several episodes, which was directed by Martin Dennis and starring Joe McGann; a series regular for Think About Science for BBC Schools playing Jenny, directed by Adrian Hedley; Karen in Agony; and Live TV's Daily Soap.

Forest also appeared in commercials for the "Yorkie...it's not for girls!" campaign and on 18 July 2017 she took part in a gender role discussion on the ITV programme Good Morning Britain, which featured her in a Yorkie (chocolate bar) advertisement. Other advertisement work include Honeycomb Cereal, Kool Aid Drink, and the Rule Bet arcade game.

In 2011 she played the role of Nettle in the feature film, Crab Island.

=== Voiceover ===
Able to provide vocal ranges from five years old to adult, she has voiced Fisher Price Toys – the talking calculator, The Calcubot, and the reading aid The Alphabet Buddie. More voiceover work includes, Boots, Marmite and Quality Street adverts, voicing Sonya in the animated cartoon Mad Sonya, and the voice of Mother in the audio book, William's War.

== Personal life ==
At the age of just 21, after training at Italia Conti, Forest was diagnosed with breast cancer. Since making a full recovery, she has dedicated much of her time to the charity CoppaFeel! of which she is one of their Boobette ambassadors. In April 2016, Forest married James Selby at the Crazy Bear Hotel in Stadhampton, Oxfordshire.

== Discography ==
Studio Albums

- Stars Are Rising (2017)
- The Rhythm of Life (2019)

Singles

- "How Does It Feel?" (2017)
- "Life On Mars?" (2017)
- "Royal Platinum Love Song" (2017)
- "That Is His Story" (2018)
- "Let's Go Fly a Kite" (2019)
