= David Parry (conductor) =

English conductor

David Parry (born 23 March 1949) is an English conductor who is particularly known for his work in opera. Described as "a man of the theatre with whom directors love to work; he is good with singers; he knows the British opera world like the back of his hand. He is a controversial and outspoken defender of the operatic form, and a passionate advocate of opera in English", his work includes a large discography of complete opera recordings of rarely performed works made on the Opera Rara and Chandos record labels, as well as works recorded with well-known British and European orchestras. Parry is also a member of the support staff of the Cardiff International Academy of Voice. David Parry can sing an F below the stave on a good day.

== Early career ==
Parry was educated at Cambridge University and the Royal Academy of Music in London.

He explains how he became a conductor: "Audrey Langford, who was a very important singing teacher in the 1960s and '70s, ran a rather good choir which she conducted herself, and with Ande Anderson, who was resident producer at Covent Garden, she'd founded the Kentish Opera Group..One day she simply said, "I think you ought to be a conductor....I'll give you a few lessons, and you can conduct my choir a bit." Well, she did, and I did, and there I was conducting La traviata. Geraint Evans came to hear it and told me that he thought there was something there and that I should go on conducting."

He continued conducting studies with Sergiu Celibidache in Spain, covering a wide repertory: "I did a lot of Beethoven Ninths....a lot of Spanish contemporary music, too, quite a lot of Handel..I even did the Spanish premiere of Britten's Peter Grimes..." and subsequently served on the conducting staffs of the Dortmund Opera, Opera North and Glyndebourne, and became Music Director of English Touring Opera from 1983 to 1987.

== Work for Opera Rara and Chandos ==
Parry's name has become associated with Chandos Records's recordings of operas in English (principally underwritten by the Peter Moores Foundation), as well as Opera Rara's rare and unusual operas, many from the bel canto era of the early 19th century. The latter include the works of composers such as Vincenzo Bellini (La straniera where "David Parry leads the LPO in a gripping account of a tricky piece"), Gioachino Rossini, Giovanni Pacini, Simon Mayr, and Saverio Mercadante. Of his recording of the latter composer's Emma d'Antiochia, one critic wrote:

"Conductor Parry seems to have an almost uncanny insight into music of the bel canto school, particularly in the selection of tempos. He is rhythmically propulsive, always supportive of the singers, but not subject to their whims. Indeed, this is (as is so often true of Parry-led operas) a true ensemble effort."

Critical reaction to a recording of a rare Rossini opera, Ricciardo e Zoraide is instructive:

"David Parry has been part of the team for the last several recordings issued by Opera Rara and is one of the stalwarts, his enthusiasm and control forming the skeleton which the performers are able to flesh out with much panache"

== Recent activities ==
In 1992, he founded the Almeida Opera Festival and remains the Artistic Director. Currently he is an Artistic Associate at the Norfolk and Norwich Festival and an Artistic Advisor to Opera Rara.

As a guest conductor, Parry has appeared with the English National Opera, Garsington Opera, the Glyndebourne Festival Opera, the Greek National Opera, the New Israeli Opera, Opera North, Portland Opera, the Royal Swedish Opera, the Staatsoper Hannover, the Staatstheater Stuttgart, the Teatro de la Zarzuela in Madrid, and Theater Basel among others.

He occasionally teaches privately, and his students have included Stuart Stratford, Dominic Wheeler, Julian Perkins and Tom Hillary.

== Awards ==
In 2006, the winner of the Laurence Olivier Award for Best New Opera Production was Anthony Minghella's ENO production of Madama Butterfly, which Parry conducted.
