= One Day Like This (album) =

One Day like This

Studio album by Rhydian Roberts
- Released: 14 April 2014
- Recorded: 2013–14
- Genre: Classical, crossover
- Length: 58:36
- Label: Futura Classics
- Producer: Ben Robbins

Rhydian Roberts chronology
Welsh Songs: Caneuon Cymraeg (2011)	One Day like This (2014)

One Day like This is the fifth studio album by Welsh classical recording artist Rhydian Roberts. It was released through Futura Classics on 14 April 2014 and reached the top of the UK Classical Charts on 20 April 2014.

== Background and recording ==
On 29 August 2013, it was revealed that Rhydian had decided to fund his fifth studio album through PledgeMusic. Explaining his decision, he said: "The music I make is about passion, and your passion for my music has allowed me to reach out further than I ever thought possible – so now I'd like you to be involved in a much more exciting way of making that music. A way that keeps all of the ideas, the passion, emotion and energy intact. So with a team we have put together and the help of revolutionary Pledge, we are creating a small but perfectly formed record label to make my next album. The album's artwork was revealed on 4 February 2014."

Rhydian worked with the Orchestra of St. John and producer Ben Robbins on the album. He also recorded duets with Bonnie Tyler, Kerry Ellis and The Edmondson Sisters. "This album has an epic feel," Rhydian said. "I wanted it to have that wide screen quality you get with the best movie soundtracks. I want it to be mesmerising and inspiring, full of passion and exciting all your emotions. Love, romance, hope, despair, faith, and the joy of being alive are all in there." He added, "There are some deeply personal choices like the Pearl Fishers duet by Bizet. I'm duetting with myself as a baritone and tenor, which sounds unusual, but I think really works well. The aria is close to my heart as it inspired me at the age of 14 to become a singer." On 3 March 2014, it was revealed that the album would be released on 14 April 2014. This makes Rhydian only the second X Factor contestant, after JLS, to release five albums.

== Track listing ==
1. "Nights in White Satin" – 4:28
2. "Ave Maria" – 4:30
3. "Miserere" (feat. Bonnie Tyler) – 4:36
4. "One Day Like This" – 3:27
5. "The Blower's Daughter" – 4:53
6. "Vivo per lei" (feat. Kerry Ellis) – 4:40
7. "Pearl Fishers duet" – 4:40
8. "Danny Boy" – 4:06
9. "Panis angelicus" – 3:41
10. "Vergin, tutto amor" – 2:52
11. "Litanei" – 3:25
12. "Sleep" – 3:07
13. "Nella Fantasia" – 4:35
14. "Suo Gan" – 3:41
15. "Ombra mai fu" – 2:46
16. "Nessun dorma" – 2:53

== Charts ==
Chart (2014)	Peak position
UK Albums (OCC)	19

== Release history ==
Region	Date	Format	Label
United Kingdom	14 April 2014	CD, digital download	Futura Classics
