= Rhydian Roberts =

Welsh singer

Background information
- Born: Rhydian James Roberts; 14 February 1983 (age 43); Sennybridge, Wales
- Genres: Musical theatre, classical crossover, opera, operatic pop, Wagnerian rock
- Occupations: Singer, musical theatre actor, television presenter
- Years active: 2007–2025
- Labels: Sony, Syco, Conehead
- Website: www.rhydian-roberts.co.uk

Rhydian James Roberts (born 14 February 1983), also known mononymously as Rhydian, is a Welsh former baritone singer, television presenter and musical theatre actor. He rose to fame in series 4 of The X Factor (2007) finishing as the runner-up to Leon Jackson. Rhydian Roberts retired from performing in February 2023 with a farewell album, with a final Greatest Hits album to follow in February 2025. He is currently an artist manager at Neil O'Brien Entertainment.

== Early years ==
Born in Sennybridge, Rhydian attended the Pontsenni Cylch Meithrin in Brecon and then Ysgol y Bannau Welsh medium school. He played rugby union for the Gwernyfed rugby football club as a junior and later for his school, as well as cricket for Powys County Junior teams. Following a gap year teaching in a small school in South Africa, Rhydian won a bursary to the Royal Birmingham Conservatoire at the University of Central England.

== Career ==
=== The X Factor ===
Rhydian has said: "I'm very proud of what I achieved on X Factor. I'm a showman and it gave me the chance to put on a show". Amongst other songs, he sang:

- A full theatrical account of "The Phantom of the Opera"
- "Get the Party Started"
- "Go West"

During the live stages of competition, eventually his "trademark white hair and flamboyant dress sense made him an audience favourite." His version of "The Impossible Dream" became the keynote track on his first album.

Rhydian's performances and results on The X Factor
Episode	Theme	Song	Result
Audition	Free choice	"Love to Me" \ "Dancing Queen"	Advanced
Bootcamp 1		"Delilah"	Advanced
Bootcamp 2		"Let It Be"	Advanced
Judges' houses	Free choice	"Somebody to Love"	Advanced
Week 1	Number Ones	"I'd Do Anything for Love (But I Won't Do That)"	Safe
Week 2	Film Themes	"The Phantom of the Opera"	Safe
Week 3	Big Band	"Get the Party Started"	Safe
Week 4	21st Century Classics	"You Raise Me Up"	Safe
Week 5	Disco	"Go West"	Safe
Week 6	Love Songs	"Somewhere"	Safe
Week 7	British Classics	"Somebody to Love"	Safe
Week 7	British Classics	"I Vow to Thee, My Country" \ "World in Union"	Safe
Week 8: Semi final	Mentor's choice	"Bridge over Troubled Water"	Safe
Week 8: Semi final	Contestants' choice	"You'll Never Walk Alone"	Safe
Week 9: Final	Christmas Songs	"O Holy Night"	Runner-up
Week 9: Final	Celebrity Duets	"You Raise Me Up" (with Katherine Jenkins)	Runner-up
Week 9: Final	Song of the Series	"Somewhere"	Runner-up
Week 9: Final	Winner's single	"When You Believe"	Runner-up

=== Recordings ===
- 2008's highest-selling album by a male newcomer (600,000 copies), was Rhydian's eponymous debut, Rhydian. It incorporated material by Jim Steinman
- His second, O Fortuna (2009), co-produced by composer Karl Jenkins, included duets with Kiri te Kanawa and Bryn Terfel. Rhydian was a guest on Morriston Orpheus Choir's CD To Where You Are (Sain, 2011).
- There were two further albums during 2011: Waves, with covers of classic 1980s pop and Caneuon Cymraeg (Welsh Songs), a mix of classic Welsh songs and original songs.
- Returning to his core repertoire of classics and pop anthems, Rhydian's fifth album, One Day Like This featured duets with Kerry Ellis and Bonnie Tyler. Within a week of release, it topped the Official Classical Album Chart, occupying the spot for ten weeks. It also reached 19 in the UK Albums Chart, and topped the Classic FM Chart.
- In 2015, he released Carry the Fire, an album inspired by the Rugby World Cup 2015. It included his version of "World In Union" - which was the official song of the Rugby World Cup - and songs related to all of the Home Nations.
- His seventh album, The Long Road, was released in 2018 and added to Spotify in 2020. It includes covers of "Castle on the Hill" by Ed Sheeran, and "The Sound of Silence" by Paul Simon.
- Rhydian's eighth album was released in February 2023, and became his second album to top the UK Classical Albums Chart (after One Day Like This). He has announced it will be his final studio album, before ending his recording career with a Greatest Hits album later in the year.

=== Concerts, galas and solo tours ===
- Rhydian toured the UK in 2008, 2013 and 2014–15. His third tour was named after his fifth record album, "One Day Like This".
- During 2018 he toured the UK in Les Musicals, co-starring with Jonathan Ansell.

=== Stage ===
- Rhydian made his debut in the 2010 European tour of The War of the Worlds – Live on Stage! (Parson Nathaniel),
- He then toured the UK in musical theatre. From 2010 to 2013 he appeared in We Will Rock You (Khashoggi, Chief of Police), Grease (40th anniversary tour, playing "Teen Angel") and Rocky Horror Show (Rocky).
- He played pantomime leads in Beauty and the Beast, praised for carrying the show "rather spectacularly" with "remarkable gravitas", and Cinderella.
- In 2015 he played Pontius Pilate in Jesus Christ Superstar and in 2016 the Dentist in Little Shop of Horrors. During Christmas 2017, he appeared in Aladdin at the SSE Arena, Belfast.

=== Television ===
- During 2009, Rhydian, One Year On was aired by S4C.
- In 2011, Rhydian presented an eight-part television entertainment series for S4C, with his album Caneuon Cymraeg (Welsh Songs) being released to tie in with it.

== Final albums ==
In February 2023, Rhydian Roberts announced his retirement from singing and released a final album:

"I’ve enjoyed my career. It's been 15 years since The X Factor, I’ve released eight albums already, and I just wanted to sign off my singing career with a couple of releases. One classical album and then later on in the year I'm doing a Best Of which has all my favourite songs from the pop world, musical theatre, and classical. That’ll be it then – I'm hanging up my recording voice."

In February 2025, he released his tenth and last album, The Very Best of My Life, a goodbye Greatest Hits collection.

Roberts went on to work as an artist manager at Neil O'Brien Entertainment.
