= Last Days of the Century =

Studio album by Al Stewart
- Released: 24 August 1988
- Recorded: March–April 1988
- Studio: Capitol Studio B (Hollywood, CA); Ground Control (Santa Monica, CA)
- Genre: Pop
- Length: 47:32 (original vinyl release)
- Label: Enigma
- Producer: Joe Chiccarelli

Al Stewart chronology
Russians & Americans (1984)	Last Days of the Century (1988)	Rhymes in Rooms (1992)

Last Days of the Century is the eleventh studio album by the British singer-songwriter Al Stewart, released in August 1988. It was re-released in 2007 with bonus tracks.

== Track listing ==
Original LP Release

Side 1

1. "Last Days of the Century" (Al Stewart, Peter White) (6:17)
2. "Real and Unreal" (Stewart) (3:32)
3. "King of Portugal" (Stewart, White) (4:22)
4. "Red Toupée" (Stewart, White) (3:34)
5. "Where Are They Now" (Stewart, White) (5:55)

Side 2

1. "Bad Reputation" (Stewart, White) (4:54)
2. "Josephine Baker" (Stewart, White) (4:11)
3. "License to Steal" (Stewart) (3:50)
4. "Fields of France" (Stewart) (2:52)
5. "Antarctica" (Stewart, White) (4:04)
6. "Ghostly Horses of the Plain" (Stewart, Steve Recker) (2:26)

Original CD Release Bonus Track

- "Helen and Cassandra" (Stewart) (4:44)

2007 CD Re-Release Bonus Tracks

- "Ghostly Horses of the Plain" (vocal) (Stewart, Recker) (3:29)
- "Ten Cents" (Stewart, Tori Amos) (4:05)
- "Dreaming" (Stewart, Amos) (4:16)

Notes

- "Ghostly Horses of the Plain" is an instrumental: Al Stewart has also recorded a version of the song with lyrics, available on the 1996 release "Seemed Like A Good Idea at the Time" and as a bonus track on the 2007 "Last Days of the Century" CD re-release.
- Tori Amos sings background vocals on two tracks, "Last Days of the Century" and "Red Toupée".
- Cover photography by AWest
- Recorded at Capitol Studio B, Hollywood, CA
- Additional recording at Ground Control, Santa Monica, CA

== Personnel ==
- Al Stewart – vocals
- Peter White – accordion, acoustic guitar, electric guitar, keyboards
- Tim Renwick – electric guitar
- Steve Farris – electric guitar
- Steve Recker – acoustic guitar, electric guitar
- Tim Landers – bass
- Vinnie Colaiuta – drums
- Steve Chapman – drums on "Helen and Cassandra", percussion
- Dave Camp – flute, saxophones
- Phil Kenzie – saxophones
- Lee R. Thornburg – trumpet
- Robin Lamble – background vocals
- Tori Amos – background vocals on "Last Days of the Century" and "Red Toupée"
- Carroll Sue Hill – background vocals

== Sources ==
- Al Stewart discography at www.alstewart.com.
- Enigma Records CD liner notes
