= Zero She Flies =

Studio album by Al Stewart
- Released: April 1970
- Recorded: 1969
- Studio: Sound Techniques, London
- Genre: Folk
- Length: 37:04
- Label: CBS
- Producer: Roy Guest

Al Stewart chronology
Love Chronicles (1969)	Zero She Flies (1970)	Orange (1972)

Professional ratings
Review scores
Source	Rating
Allmusic	3/5 stars

Zero She Flies is the third studio album by folk artist Al Stewart, released in 1970. It is the first of his albums to include a song with historical references, namely "Manuscript", which refers to the events which led to the outbreak of World War I, including the assassination of Archduke Franz Ferdinand of Austria.

The expression "zero she flies" comes from early aviation and refers to the flight of a plane (typically a biplane) flying blind but exactly on course through darkness or dense fog.

== Album information ==
The album is commercially available as part of a CD boxset To Whom It May Concern, which contains his first three albums as well as a single and its B side and a couple of tracks added to the rerelease of Bed-Sitter Images in 1970. The 2007 re-release includes bonus tracks.

== Track listing ==
All tracks composed by Al Stewart; except where indicated.

=== Original LP release ===
1. "My Enemies Have Sweet Voices" (Stewart, Peter Morgan)
2. "A Small Fruit Song"
3. "Gethsemane, Again"
4. "Burbling"
5. "Electric Los Angeles Sunset"
6. "Manuscript"
7. "Black Hill"
8. "Anna"
9. "Room of Roots"
10. "Zero She Flies"

=== 2007 Collectors' Choice Music edition ===
1. "My Enemies Have Sweet Voices" (Stewart, Peter Morgan) – 5:14
2. "A Small Fruit Song" – 2:02
3. "Gethsemane, Again" – 5:28
4. "Burbling" – 3:19
5. "Electric Los Angeles Sunset" – 3:47
6. "Manuscript" – 4:45
7. "Black Hill" – 1:22
8. "Anna" – 1:47
9. "Room of Roots" – 3:52
10. "Zero She Flies" – 5:35
11. "Stormy Night" – 3:29
12. "News from Spain" – 6:05
13. "Lyke-Wake Dirge" (Traditional) – 4:22 vocals by Mimi Fariña

== Personnel ==
- Al Stewart - guitar, vocals
- Performers: Duffy Power, Georg Hultgreen, Gerry Conway, Larry Steele, Louis Cennamo, Michael Woods, Peter Gavin, Tim Hinkley, Trevor Lucas

Technical

- Jerry Boys - engineer
- Sophie Litchfield - photography
