= Live/Indian Summer =

Live album by Al Stewart
- Released: 21 October 1981
- Recorded: April–August 1981
- Venue: The Roxy, Los Angeles
- Studio: Evergreen Studios, Los Angeles
- Genre: Rock
- Length: 80:04 (original LP release); 79:15 (2007 re-release)
- Label: Europe: RCA; US: Arista
- Producer: Chris Desmond, Al Stewart

Al Stewart chronology
| 24 Carrots (1980) | Live/Indian Summer (1981) | Russians & Americans (1984) |

Professional ratings
Review scores
| Source | Rating |
|---|---|
| AllMusic | 2/5 stars |

Live/Indian Summer is the first live album by Al Stewart, released in 1981. It was originally released as a double LP, with sides 2, 3 & 4 featuring live material while side 1 featured five new studio recordings. The side 1 tracks were recorded at Evergreen Studios, Los Angeles between June–August 1981, while the three live sides were recorded at The Roxy Theatre, Los Angeles in April 1981.

Although all musicians were credited, the band itself Shot in the Dark were uncredited on the album sleeve and label, which was the second and last album Stewart performed with them as his backing band. They are however introduced with Stewart before the first song of the live-set.

This album was never released on CD in its entirety until 2007, where previously, the five studio tracks were released as bonus tracks on the 24 Carrots CD re-releases, and the live tracks on the 1997 re-release, Live at the Roxy, Los Angeles 1981. The 2007 re-release includes all sixteen tracks on one compact disc.

== Track listing ==
All tracks written by Al Stewart unless otherwise noted

Side 1 (studio)

1. "Here in Angola" – 4:37
2. "Pandora" (Al Stewart, Peter White) – 4:33
3. "Indian Summer" – 3:33
4. "Delia's Gone" – 2:47
5. "Princess Olivia" – 3:21

Side 2 (live)

1. "Running Man" (Stewart, White) – 4:43
2. "Time Passages" (Stewart, White) – 6:26
3. "Merlin's Time" (Stewart, White) – 2:56
4. "If It Doesn't Come Naturally, Leave It" – 4:27

Side 3 (live)

1. "Roads to Moscow" – 8:13
2. "Nostradamus/World Goes To Riyadh" – 13:01

Side 4 (live)

1. "Soho (Needless To Say)" – 3:43
2. "On The Border" – 4:46
3. "Valentina Way" – 4:17
4. "Clarence Frogman Henry" – 1:43
5. "Year of the Cat" (Stewart, Peter Wood) – 7:07
- "Pandora" and "Indian Summer" are inverted on the RCA release.
- Unlike the original LP release, all live tracks on the 1997 and 2007 re-releases are joined with crowd noise and have no fade outs.

== Personnel ==
- Al Stewart – vocals, acoustic guitar, electric guitar, keyboards

Shot in the Dark

- Peter White – keyboards, acoustic guitar, electric guitar, accordion, percussion, backing vocals
- Adam Yurman – electric guitar, acoustic guitar, backing vocals
- Robin Lamble – bass guitar, violin, backing vocals
- Krysia Kristianne – keyboards, percussion, penny whistle, backing vocals
- Bryan Savage – saxophones, flute

Additional musicians

- Harry Stinson – drums, percussion, backing vocals
- Steve Chapman – percussion
- Jerry McMillan – violin, percussion
- Flo & Eddie – backing vocals (Indian Summer)
- Andrew Powell – string arrangements (Roads to Moscow & Year of the Cat)
- David Campbell – string arrangements (Delia's Gone)

Technical

- Aaron Rapoport – photography

== Charts ==
| Chart (1981) | Peak position |
|---|---|
| US Top LPs & Tape (Billboard) | 110 |
