= Privateer (disambiguation) =

A privateer is a pirate operating on behalf of a government.

Privateer may also refer to:

== Games and sports ==
- Wing Commander: Privateer and its expansion pack Privateer: Righteous Fire, a 1993 video game
- Privateer Press, publisher of tabletop role-playing games
- Pirateer, a board game
- Privateer (motorsport), a competitor in motorsports who does not have manufacturer support
- New Orleans Privateers, sports teams at the University of New Orleans

== Music and TV ==
- "Privateers" (The West Wing), a 2003 episode of The West Wing TV series
- Privateering (album), a 2012 album by Mark Knopfler and a track on the album
- Privateer (album), a 2007 album by Tim Renwick

== Vehicles ==
- Consolidated PB4Y-2 Privateer, a naval version of the B-24 Liberator bomber
- USS Privateer, later YP-179, a United States Navy patrol vessel in commission from 1917 to 1930

== Other ==
- Privateer, South Carolina
- Privateer Holdings, American private equity company
