= Famous Last Words (Al Stewart album) =

Studio album by Al Stewart
- Released: 21 September 1993
- Recorded: Capitol Recording Studios, Hollywood, California; Clearlake Audio, North Hollywood, California; O'Henry Studios, Burbank, California; Rockett Plant, North Hollywood, California
- Genre: Folk rock, Pop, Soft rock, Baroque pop, Folk-pop, Pop rock
- Length: 47:16
- Label: Mesa (US), EMI (UK)
- Producer: Ross Hogarth, Peter White, Joe Chiccarelli

Al Stewart chronology
Rhymes in Rooms (1992)	Famous Last Words (1993)	Between the Wars (1995)

Professional ratings
Review scores
Source	Rating
AllMusic	3/5 stars

Famous Last Words is the twelfth studio album by Scottish-born English singer Al Stewart, released in September 1993.

== Track listing ==
All tracks composed by Al Stewart; except where indicated

1. "Feel Like" – 3:35
2. "Angel of Mercy" – 3:51
3. "Don't Forget Me" – 5:21 (Stewart, Peter White)
4. "Peter on the White Sea" – 3:37 (Stewart, David Pack, Andrew Powell)
5. "Genie on a Table Top" – 3:47
6. "Trespasser" – 4:45 (Stewart, Peter White)
7. "Trains" – 8:17
8. "Necromancer" – 3:40
9. "Charlotte Corday" – 3:47 (Stewart, Tori Amos)
10. "Hipposong" – 1:52
11. "Night Rolls In" – 4:35

The 2006 EMI re-release has the following additional tracks:

1. "In the Dark" – 4:58
2. "Blow Your Mansion Down" – 4:55
3. "Mixed Blessing" – 2:54

The 2007 Collector's Choice re-release has the following additional tracks:

1. "The Coldest Winter in Memory" – 5:50
2. "Blow Your Mansion Down" – 4:57
3. "In the Dark" – 4:58

== Musicians ==
- Vocals: Al Stewart
- Electric Guitar: Ardeshir Eddie Farah, Ed Tree, Eric Williams, Todd Sharp
- Electric Guitar, Percussion: Ross Hogarth
- Electric Guitar, Piano, Keyboards, Accordion: Peter White
- Bass Guitar: Tim Landers
- Organ: Peter Wood
- Violin: Charlie Bisharat
- Violin, Viola: Daryl S.
- Cello: Alan Matthews
- Saxophone: Dave Boruff
- Tuba: Freebo
- Drums, Percussion: Denny Fongheiser
- Percussion: Luis Conte
- Backing Vocals: Neal Morse, Robin Lamble
