= Time Passages =

Studio album by Al Stewart
- Released: 8 September 1978
- Recorded: June 1978
- Studios: Davlen Studios, Los Angeles
- Genres: Soft rock; folk rock
- Length: 44:38
- Labels: UK: RCA (original release); EMI (1991 reissue); US: Arista (original release); Mobile Fidelity Sound Lab (audiophile release); Rhino (2004 remaster)
- Producer: Alan Parsons

Al Stewart chronology
Year of the Cat (1976)	Time Passages (1978)	24 Carrots (1980)

Professional ratings
Review scores
Source	Rating
AllMusic	4.5/5 stars
The Rolling Stone Album Guide	2.5/5 stars

Time Passages is the eighth studio album by Al Stewart, released in September 1978. It is the follow-up to his 1976 album Year of the Cat. Like "Year of the Cat" and 1975's Modern Times, it was produced by Alan Parsons. The album's title track (which, when edited, reached number 7 on the Billboard charts) and "End of the Day" were both co-written by Peter White. The title track occupied number 1 on the Billboard Adult Contemporary charts for 10 weeks.

A digitally remastered version of the album was released in 2004.

== Artwork ==
The album's front and back cover were designed by Hipgnosis. As Storm Thorgerson stated in For the Love of Vinyl: The Album Art of Hipgnosis, "For Al's Time Passages we showed a radio being tuned on the shelf of a kitchen window but at the same time "tuning" the view of the landscape outside the window". The front cover photograph was taken at Indian Route 42, Monument Valley, Arizona.

== Track listing ==
Songs written by Al Stewart unless otherwise noted.

Side one
No.	Title	Lyrics	Length
1.	"Time Passages"	Al Stewart; Peter White	6:41
2.	"Valentina Way"		4:04
3.	"Life in Dark Water"		5:49
4.	"A Man for All Seasons"		5:50

Side two
No.	Title	Lyrics	Length
1.	"Almost Lucy"		3:43
2.	"The Palace of Versailles"		5:20
3.	"Timeless Skies"		3:34
4.	"Song on the Radio"		6:22
5.	"End of the Day"	Al Stewart; Peter White	3:11

== Historical references ==
- "A Man For All Seasons" refers to Sir Thomas More, statesman under Henry VIII of England (misidentified by Stewart as "Henry Plantagenet") and a Catholic martyr.
- "The Palace of Versailles", refers to the actual Palace of Versailles, the former residence of the French Kings and a key site in early days of the French Revolution. The lyrics contain specific allusions to many events and figures of the revolution.
- "Life in Dark Water" – references the Mary Celeste, questioning the usage of the inaccurate term "Marie Celeste". (Also see J. Habakuk Jephson's Statement)

== Personnel ==
- Al Stewart - guitars, keyboards, vocals
- Peter White - guitars, lead guitar (tracks 1, 2 and 9), keyboards, accordion
- J. Peter Robinson - grand piano, organ on "Valentina Way"
- Peter Solley - synthesizer on "Palace of Versailles"
- Peter Wood - keyboards, organ, piano
- Tim Renwick - electric guitar, lead guitar (tracks 3, 4, 5 and 6)
- Robin Lamble - bass guitar
- Mark Goldenberg - rhythm guitar on "Valentina Way"
- Phil Kenzie - alto saxophone on tracks 1 and 8
- Stuart Elliott - drums (except track 2)
- Jeff Porcaro - drums on "Valentina Way"
- Al Perkins - pedal steel guitar
- Bill Linnane - guitar
- Art Tripp lll, Lindsay Elliott - percussion
- Brian Huddy, Joe Puerta, David Pack, James R. West, Krysia Kristianne, Jeff Borgeson - backing vocals
- Andrew Powell - string arrangements

== Charts ==
=== Weekly charts ===
Chart (1978)	Peak position
Australian Albums (Kent Music Report)	15
Canada Top Albums/CDs (RPM)	8
Dutch Albums (Album Top 100)	28
German Albums (Offizielle Top 100)	8
New Zealand Albums (RMNZ)	33
UK Albums (Official Charts)	39
US Billboard 200	10

=== Year-end charts ===
Chart (1978)	Position
Canada Top Albums/CDs (RPM)	63
Chart (1979)	Position
German Albums (Offizielle Top 100)	20

== Certifications and sales ==
Region	Certification	Certified units/sales
United Kingdom (BPI)	Silver	60,000^{^}
United States (RIAA)	Platinum	1,000,000^{^}
^{^} Shipments figures based on certification alone.
