= Modern Times (Al Stewart album) =

Studio album by Al Stewart
- Released: January 1975 (UK), March 1975 (US)
- Recorded: October 1974
- Studio: Abbey Road Studios, London
- Genre: Rock
- Length: 38:45
- Label: UK: CBS; US: Janus
- Producer: Alan Parsons

Al Stewart chronology
Past, Present and Future (1973)	Modern Times (1975)	Year of the Cat (1976)

Alternative cover
- U.S. cover

Professional ratings
Review scores
Source	Rating
Allmusic	4.5/5 stars

Modern Times is Al Stewart's sixth studio album, released in 1975. The album was re-released in 2007 with bonus tracks. A further remaster by Paschal Byrne was released on Esoteric Recordings in 2015.

== Track listing ==
All tracks composed by Al Stewart except as indicated.

=== 1975 original LP edition ===
Side 1

1. "Carol" – 4:24
2. "Sirens of Titan" – 2:50
3. "What's Going On?" – 3:34
4. "Not the One" – 4:34
5. "Next Time" – 4:19

Side 2

1. "Apple Cider Re-Constitution" – 5:19
2. "The Dark and the Rolling Sea" – 5:21
3. "Modern Times" (Dave Mudge, Stewart) – 8:21

=== 2000 Beat Goes On edition bonus tracks ===
1. "News from Spain" - 6:03
2. "Elvaston Place" - 2:53
3. "Swallow Wind" - 3:21

=== 2007 Collector's Choice Music edition bonus tracks ===
1. "Swallow Wind" - 3:23
2. "A Sense of Deja Vu" - 4:50
3. "Willie the King" - 4:01

== Personnel ==
- Al Stewart - vocals, acoustic guitar
- Brian Bennett - backing vocals
- David Ellis - acoustic guitar
- Isaac Guillory - guitar
- Simon Nicol - acoustic guitar
- Tim Renwick - electric guitar
- Andrew Powell - orchestral arrangement on "Modern Times"
- Tony Carr - percussion
- Gerry Conway - drums
- Stuart Cowell - dobro, electric guitar
- Barry De Souza - drums
- George Ford - bass
- Neil Lancaster - backing vocals
- Chas Mills - backing vocals
- Peter Moss - bass, fuzz bass
- Graham Smith - harmonica
- Pete Wingfield - keyboards
- Peter Wood - keyboards, accordion

Technical

- Alan Parsons - engineer, string arrangement on "Apple Cider Re-Constitution"
- Peter James - engineer
- Hipgnosis - sleeve design, photography

== Charts ==
Chart (1975)	Peak position
US Billboard 200	30

== Notes ==
- "Sirens of Titan" is based on the novel of the same name by Kurt Vonnegut.
- The original enigmatic album cover photograph was taken in the grounds of Stone House, Rushlake Green, near Heathfield in Sussex. In Britain this cover photo was superseded in 1977 by a portrait photo of Al Stewart, presumably in order to capitalise on his enhanced popularity as a result of the Year of the Cat album.
- The blonde woman on the album cover is Pink Floyd guitarist David Gilmour's first wife, Ginger. The Cord automobile Stewart is sitting in belonged to Led Zeppelin guitarist Jimmy Page.
- Centered in the cover, holding a mirror reflecting a bright light toward the viewer, as on Stewart's previous album, Past, Present and Future, the US version of the album features the Marvel Comics character Doctor Strange.
