= Year of the Cat (album) =

Studio album by Al Stewart
- Released: 22 October 1976
- Recorded: 1976
- Studios: Abbey Road Studios, London; Davlen Sound Studios, North Hollywood, California
- Genres: Rock, soft rock, progressive pop
- Length: 38:55
- Labels: RCA, Parlophone (2014), Janus, Arista
- Producer: Alan Parsons

Al Stewart chronology
Modern Times (1975)	Year of the Cat (1976)	Time Passages (1978)

Year of the Cat is the seventh studio album by Al Stewart, released in 1976. It was produced and engineered by Alan Parsons. Its sales helped by the hit single "Year of the Cat", co-written by Peter Wood and described by AllMusic as "one of those 'mysterious woman' songs", the album was a top five hit in the United States. The other single from the album was "On the Border," which reached number 47 in Canada.

Stewart had all of the music and orchestration written and completely recorded before he even had a title for any of the songs. In a Canadian radio interview he stated that he has done this for six of his albums, and he often writes four different sets of lyrics for each song. The title track derives from a song Stewart wrote in 1966 called "Foot of the Stage" with prescient lyrics about Tony Hancock, one of Britain's favourite comedians who died by suicide two years later. When Stewart discovered that Hancock was not well known in the United States, he went back to his original title "Year of the Cat".

== Cover art ==
The cover design, by Hipgnosis and illustrator Colin Elgie, depicts a woman who has an apparent obsession with cats. She can be seen in the mirror dressing up as a cat for a costume party, and all of the items on her dresser have feline motifs. Stewart used the same concept for the cover of his 2004 Greatest Hits album, but with most of the cat items replaced with references to his other singles.

== Reception ==
Professional ratings
Review scores
Source	Rating
AllMusic	4.5/5 stars
American Songwriter	4.5/5 stars
Christgau's Record Guide	B−
Encyclopedia of Popular Music	4/5 stars
The Great Rock Discography	8/10
MusicHound	2.5/5
Record Collector	4/5 stars
The Rolling Stone Album Guide	2.5/5 stars

In the United States, Year of the Cat was certified platinum in March 1977, indicating sales of more than one million copies.

Contemporary reviews were mixed but generally positive. Billboard praised the album featuring "Stewart's cool vocals and exceptionally well-arranged songs that are progressive without being pretentious", whereas Robert Christgau thought Stewart's move from historical themes to the tone of "spy-novels" was an improvement. Peter Reilly, writing for Stereo Review, found Stewart's "hissing sibilant 's's" unintentionally hilarious, especially when combined with the "gloweringly melodramatic" "On the Border". Reilly nonetheless praised the songwriting, "warm, easy atmosphere", and Stewart's guitar skills.

Alan Parsons' production and rich arrangements were widely praised. By 1987, Year of the Cat had become a popular record used for hi-fi demonstration.

Chris Woodstra called Year of the Cat Al Stewart's masterpiece. Stephen Thomas Erlewine of AllMusic agreed, calling it the perfection of Stewart's sound and style.

== Track listing ==
All tracks composed by Al Stewart, except where indicated.

=== 1976 Original LP edition ===
Side 1

1. "Lord Grenville" – 5:00
2. "On the Border" – 3:22
3. "Midas Shadow" – 3:08
4. "Sand in Your Shoes" – 3:02
5. "If It Doesn't Come Naturally, Leave It" – 4:28

Side 2

1. "Flying Sorcery" – 4:20
2. "Broadway Hotel" – 3:55
3. "One Stage Before" – 4:39
4. "Year of the Cat" (Stewart, Peter Wood) – 6:40

=== 2001 Remaster bonus tracks ===
1. "On the Border" [live] - 3:48
2. "Belsize Blues" - 3:30
3. "Story of the Songs" - 9:42

=== 2021 45th Anniversary Deluxe Edition ===
1. "Lord Grenville" - 5:04
2. "On the Border" - 3:23
3. "Midas Shadow" - 3:13
4. "Sand in Your Shoes" - 3:05
5. "If It Doesn't Come Naturally, Leave It" - 4:30
6. "Flying Sorcery" - 4:22
7. "Broadway Hotel" - 3:59
8. "One Stage Before" - 4:42
9. "Year of the Cat" - 6:43
10. "Belsize Blues" - 3:28
11. "Apple Cider Re-Constitution" [Live in Seattle 1976] - 5:23
12. "The Dark and the Rolling Sea" [Live in Seattle 1976] - 4:58
13. "One Stage Before" [Live in Seattle 1976] - 5:00
14. "Soho (Needless to Say)" [Live in Seattle 1976] - 3:56
15. "Not the One" [Live in Seattle 1976] - 5:22
16. "On the Border" [Live in Seattle 1976] - 4:05
17. "Broadway Hotel" [Live in Seattle 1976] - 4:59
18. "Roads to Moscow " [Live in Seattle 1976] - 8:14
19. "Nostradamus " [Live in Seattle 1976] - 9:13
20. "Sirens of Titan" [Live in Seattle 1976] - 3:13
21. "The Post World War Two Blues" [Live in Seattle 1976] - 5:07
22. "Year of the Cat" [Live in Seattle 1976] - 8:36
23. "Sand in Your Shoes" [Live in Seattle 1976] - 3:02
24. "Carol" [Live in Seattle 1976] - 5:09
25. "If It Doesn’t Come Naturally, Leave It" [Live in Seattle 1976] - 5:21
26. "Lord Grenville" [5.1 Surround] - 5:04
27. "On the Border" [5.1 Surround] - 3:23
28. "Midas Shadow" [5.1 Surround] - 3:13
29. "Sand in Your Shoes" [5.1 Surround] - 3:05
30. "If It Doesn’t Come Naturally, Leave It" [5.1 Surround] - 4:30
31. "Flying Sorcery" [5.1 Surround] - 4:22
32. "Broadway Hotel" [5.1 Surround] - 3:59
33. "One Stage Before" [5.1 Surround] - 4:42
34. "Year of the Cat" [5.1 Surround] - 6:43

== Personnel ==
- Al Stewart - vocals, guitars, keyboards
- Peter White - acoustic guitar & spanish guitar solos
- Tim Renwick - Electric guitar
- Peter Wood - Piano
- Don Lobster - keyboards
- George Ford - bass
- Stuart Elliott - drums, percussion
- Bobby Bruce - violin
- Marion Driscoll - triangle
- Phil Kenzie - alto saxophone
- Graham Smith - harmonica

== Backing Vocals ==
- David Pack - backing vocals
- John Perry - backing vocals
- Tony Rivers - backing vocals
- Stuart Calver - backing vocals

== Others ==
- Andrew Powell - string arrangements
- Alan Parsons - Musical Production
- Hipgnosis, Colin Elgie - cover design
- Rob Brimson - back cover photography

== Charts ==
=== Weekly charts ===
Chart (1977–78)	Peak position
Australian Albums (Kent Music Report)	10
Canada Top Albums/CDs (RPM)	13
Dutch Albums (Album Top 100)	2
German Albums (Offizielle Top 100)	42
New Zealand Albums (RMNZ)	4
Scottish Albums (Official Charts)	43
UK Albums (Official Charts)	38
US Billboard 200	5

=== Year-end charts ===
Chart (1977)	Position
Canada Top Albums/CDs (RPM)	75
Dutch Albums (Album Top 100)	3
New Zealand Albums (RMNZ)	19
US Billboard 200	18

== Sales and certifications ==
Certifications for Year of the Cat
Region	Certification	Certified units/sales
Canada (Music Canada)	Platinum	100,000^{^}
Germany (BVMI)	Gold	250,000^{^}
United Kingdom (BPI)	Gold	100,000^{^}
United States (RIAA)	Platinum	1,000,000^{^}
^{^} Shipments figures based on certification alone.
