= Love Chronicles =

Studio album by Al Stewart
- Released: September 1969 (UK), January 1970 (US)
- Recorded: 1968–1969
- Genre: Folk
- Length: 43:03
- Label: CBS (UK), Epic (US)
- Producer: Roy Guest, John Wood, Al Stewart

Al Stewart chronology
Bed-Sitter Images (1967)	Love Chronicles (1969)	Zero She Flies (1970)

Professional ratings
Review scores
Source	Rating
AllMusic	3.5/5 stars
Christgau's Record Guide	B+

Love Chronicles is the second studio album by the British folk artist Al Stewart, released in September 1969. It was his first album to be released in the US (and was also the only one of his first four albums). Among the supporting musicians were Jimmy Page and John Paul Jones of Led Zeppelin along with four members of Fairport Convention: bassist Ashley Hutchings, guitarist Simon Nicol (as "Simon Breckenridge"), drummer Martin Lamble (as "Martyn Francis") and guitarist Richard Thompson (as "Marvyn Prestwick").

Melody Maker named the record "Folk Album of the Year" for 1969. The American critic Robert Christgau called it "a landmark: the first rock record to use the word 'fuck' ('fucking,' actually)", referring to the 18-minute title track.

In 1993, select tracks from Love Chronicles were released in the UK as part of the double CD To Whom It May Concern, an anthology of Stewart's first three albums. In 2007, Love Chronicles was reissued with three bonus tracks by the Collector's Choice label.

== Track listing ==
All tracks composed and arranged by Al Stewart

=== Original LP release ===
1. "In Brooklyn" – 3:42
2. "Old Compton Street Blues" – 4:25
3. "The Ballad of Mary Foster" – 8:01
4. "Life and Life Only" – 5:47
5. "You Should Have Listened to Al" – 3:01
6. "Love Chronicles" – 18:06

=== Cassette release ===
1. "You Should Have Listened to Al"
2. "Old Compton Street Blues"
3. "The Ballad of Mary Foster"
4. "Life and Life Only"
5. "In Brooklyn"
6. "Love Chronicles"

=== 2007 Collectors' Choice Music edition ===
1. "In Brooklyn" – 3:43
2. "Old Compton Street Blues" – 4:26
3. "The Ballad of Mary Foster" – 8:02
4. "Life and Life Only" – 5:49
5. "You Should Have Listened to Al" – 3:02
6. "Love Chronicles" – 18:04

Bonus tracks

1. "Jackdaw" – 3:20
2. "She Follows Her Own Rules" (Al Stewart, Peter White) – 3:18
3. "Fantasy" – 2:15

== Personnel ==
- Al Stewart – vocals, guitar
- Jimmy Page – guitar on "Love Chronicles"
- Simon Breckenridge (pseudonym for Simon Nicol) – guitar
- Marvyn Prestwyck (pseudonym for Richard Thompson) – guitar
- Brian Brocklehurst – bass
- Harvey Burns – drums
- Martyn Francis (pseudonym of Martin Lamble) – drums
- Brian Odgers – bass
- John Paul Jones – bass on "Love Chronicles"
- Ashley Hutchings – bass
- Steve Gray – organ
- Phil Phillips – organ
- Krysia Kristianne, Robin Lamble – backing vocals on "Jackdaw"

== Technical ==
- Ron Pender, John Wood – engineer
- Sophie Litchfield – photography
