= Rhymes in Rooms =

Live album by Al Stewart
- Released: March 1992
- Venue: McCabe's Guitar Shop (Santa Monica, CA); The Birchmere (Alexandria, VA); Banana Hill (Osaka, Japan)
- Genre: Acoustic
- Length: 58:25
- Label: Mesa (US), EMI (UK)
- Producer: Michael Fagrey

Al Stewart chronology
Last Days of the Century (1988)	Rhymes in Rooms (1992)	Famous Last Words (1993)

Professional ratings
Review scores
Source	Rating
Allmusic	3/5 stars

Rhymes in Rooms is the second live album by Al Stewart, released in 1992. It is an acoustic concert featuring Stewart and his longtime collaborator Peter White in a number of sets recorded live in locations in the US and Japan.

== Track listing ==
1. "Flying Sorcery" – 4:29
2. "Soho (Needless to Say)" – 3:50
3. "Time Passages" – 5:37
4. "Josephine Baker" – 4:01
5. "On the Border" – 5:03
6. "Nostradamus" – 10:10
7. "Fields of France" – 4:05
8. "Clifton in the Rain/Small Fruit Song" – 4:51
9. "Broadway Hotel" – 4:15
10. "Leave It" – 5:24
11. "Year of the Cat" – 6:36
- "Leave It" is the song "If It Doesn't Come Naturally, Leave It".

== Musicians ==
- Al Stewart – vocal, guitar
- Peter White – guitar, accordion, piano
