= Between the Wars (disambiguation) =

Between the wars or Between the Wars usually refers to the Interwar period (1919–1939), between World War I and World War II.

Between the Wars may also refer to:

- Between the Wars (Al Stewart album)
- Between the Wars (EP), an EP by Billy Bragg
- Between the Wars (TV series), a 1973 UK series featuring Zoë Wanamaker
- Between the Wars (book series), a book series by Michael Moorcock
