= Nachmanoff =

Nachmanoff is a surname. Notable people with the surname include:

- Dave Nachmanoff (born 1964), American folk singer-songwriter
- Jeffrey Nachmanoff (born 1967), American screenwriter and director
