= Orange (Al Stewart album) =

Studio album by Al Stewart
- Released: 1 January 1972
- Recorded: September 1971
- Studio: Trident Studios, London
- Genre: Folk rock, progressive rock
- Length: 38:45
- Label: CBS
- Producer: John Anthony

Al Stewart chronology
Zero She Flies (1970)	Orange (1972)	Past, Present and Future (1973)

Professional ratings
Review scores
Source	Rating
Allmusic	4/5 stars

Orange is the fourth studio album by Al Stewart, originally released in 1972, and re-released in 1996 and 2007 on CD. Generally regarded as a 'transitional album' between the confessional folk sounds of his first three albums and the historically themed albums of his more successful mid-1970s period, the album includes Rick Wakeman on piano as well as future Elvis Costello and the Attractions bassist Bruce Thomas. The album also included one of the very few cover versions recorded by Stewart, Bob Dylan's "I Don't Believe You". In a 2024 interview, Wakeman called Orange a "forgotten album," noting that he "just loved" the song "The News from Spain."

== Track listing ==
All tracks composed by Al Stewart except where noted.

=== Original LP release ===
1. "You Don't Even Know Me" – 4:00
2. "Amsterdam" – 2:56
3. "Songs Out of Clay" – 4:16
4. "The News from Spain" – 6:34
5. "I Don't Believe You" (Bob Dylan) – 3:38
6. "Once an Orange, Always an Orange" – 4:18
7. "I'm Falling" – 4:28
8. "Night of the 4th of May" – 6:27

=== 2007 Collector's Choice Music bonus tracks ===
- "Soho" – 3:57
- "Elvaston Place" – 2:52
- "It Doesn't Matter Anymore" (Paul Anka) – 2:25

== Personnel ==
- Al Stewart – vocals, acoustic guitar
- Tim Renwick – electric guitar (all tracks), Spanish guitar (3)
- Cal Batchelor – Spanish guitar (3)
- Timothy Walker – Spanish guitar (4)
- Brinsley Schwarz – 12-string acoustic guitar
- Bruce Thomas, Brian Odgers – bass
- Rick Wakeman – piano, organ
- Bob Andrews – organ (8)
- Graham Hunt, Roger Pope, John Willie Wilson – drums
- John Donelly, Kevin Powers, Mick Welton – backing vocals (2)

Technical

- David Hentschel – engineer
- Keith "Keef" MacMillan - photography
