= Uncorked =

Uncorked may refer to:

- Uncorked (1998 film) or At Sachem Farm
- Uncorked (2009 film), a Hallmark Channel television film
- Uncorked (2020 film), an American drama film
- Uncorked (album), a 2009 album by Al Stewart
