= Midnight Rocks =

Single by Al Stewart

from the album 24 Carrots
- B-side: "Constantinople"
- Released: August 1980
- Genre: Pop rock
- Length: 3:48
- Label: Arista Records 0552
- Songwriters: Al Stewart, Peter White
- Producers: Al Stewart, Chris Desmond

Al Stewart singles chronology
"Song on the Radio" (1979)	"Midnight Rocks" (1980)	"Mondo Sinistro" (1980)

"Midnight Rocks" is a song written by Al Stewart and Peter White and was performed by Stewart. The song appeared on his 1980 album, 24 Carrots.

"Midnight Rocks" reached No. 24 on the Billboard Hot 100 singles chart and No. 13 on the Adult Contemporary chart in the United States in 1980. The song peaked at No. 79 in Canada. It also charted modestly on the Canadian Adult Contemporary chart (#46). The song was the last charting single by Stewart.

== Charts ==
Chart (1981/82)	Position
Australia (Kent Music Report)	50
Canada (RPM Top 100 Singles)	79
USA (Hot 100)	24
