= Andrew Powell =

English musical composer (born 1949)

Andrew Powell (born 18 April 1949) is a British musical composer, arranger and performer, born of Welsh parents. He moved to Wales in 2003.

== Early life ==
Powell was born in Surrey, England. He began piano lessons at the age of four and later attended King's College School, Wimbledon, by which time he was also learning viola, violin and orchestral percussion. He began writing music by the age of eleven and later studied composition with Karlheinz Stockhausen and György Ligeti at Darmstadt in Germany, before taking a music master's degree at King's College, Cambridge. While at Cambridge he joined an electronic music group, Intermodulation, with Roger Smalley, Tim Souster and Robin Thompson, and a local progressive rock group, Henry Cow, formed by Fred Frith and Tim Hodgkinson, in which he alternated between bass and drums.

== Musical career ==
After leaving Cambridge, Powell's first professional engagement was as a soloist at the BBC Proms, London in August 1970, playing Terry Riley's Keyboard Studies with Roger Smalley. He later worked with several orchestras, including Covent Garden's, with the London Symphony Orchestra, London Philharmonic Orchestra, BBC Welsh Orchestra and BBC Symphony Orchestra, where he worked with Pierre Boulez. He also began to serve as a session player, and founded the group "Come to the Edge" with Robin Thompson and Morris Pert, which performed regularly with the Japanese percussion virtuoso Stomu Yamashta.

Powell's career as an arranger began at this time. His first commission was the debut album for Cockney Rebel, whose next two albums he also arranged. He worked with other artists, including Leo Sayer, John Miles ("Music"), Donovan, Cliff Richard ("Miss You Nights"), Al Stewart (Modern Times, Year of the Cat, Time Passages, Russians & Americans and Between the Wars), Ambrosia (Somewhere I've Never Traveled), David Gilmour, Chris Rea, Mick Fleetwood, The Hollies and Münchener Freiheit.

Powell is credited as a member of The Alan Parsons Project on its first album (Tales of Mystery and Imagination) in the roles of arranger, conductor and composer. He continued to work as arranger and conductor on all but one of their albums, and with Alan Parsons when the group broke up. He performed live with Alan Parsons and Al Stewart, and made an orchestral album from The Alan Parsons Project's songs: The Philharmonia Orchestra Plays The Best of The Alan Parsons Project in 1983.

Powell produced Kate Bush's three-song demo tape and her debut album The Kick Inside (1978). He later produced, with help from Bush, her second album, Lionheart (1978).

Other artists he has worked with include Chris De Burgh, Nick Heyward, Michael Crawford, Elaine Paige, The Hollies and Kansas.

Powell wrote the soundtrack for the movies Ladyhawke and Rocket Gibraltar and has contributed to many other movie and TV projects. He has conducted orchestras and ensembles all over the world, including the Philharmonia Orchestra, the London Symphony Orchestra, the Berlin Philharmonic Orchestra, the Hong Kong Philharmonic Orchestra, the Los Angeles Philharmonic Orchestra, the Sydney Symphony, the Wellington Symphony Orchestra, the Bayerische Rundfunk Orchestra and the Kammeroper München, as well as the Black Dyke Mills Band and Grimethorpe Colliery Band.

== Recent work ==
More recent work has included arranging and conducting Wouter Van Belle's Wow & Flutter, and writing for brass bands including the Grimethorpe Colliery Band, Parc & Dare Band and Burry Port Town Band, also the album Stockhausen: Michael's Farewell, etc with John Wallace.

Living Stones received its world première at St Davids Cathedral, Wales, on 27 October 2007, and Glasiad y dydd dros Ben Dinas at the City of London Festival on 19 March 2008.

In 2017, after a break from film scoring of nearly 30 years, he composed original music for the sci-fi short Here We Go Again, Rubinot!, directed by Italian cinematographer Giuliano Tomassacci. The score appeared the next year on Kronos Records in a limited CD release.

Powell is artistic director of BluestoneArts, a social enterprise company that promotes music, words and visual arts in north Pembrokeshire.

== Personal life ==
Powell moved to Wales in 2003, having started studying Welsh beforehand. He is now a fluent speaker.
