= Owen Hand =

Scottish singer

- Born: Owen Francis Hand; 28 December 1938; Edinburgh, Scotland
- Died: 16 February 2003 (aged 64); Coldstream, Scottish Borders, Scotland
- Occupations: Folk singer and songwriter

Owen Francis Hand (28 December 1938 – 16 February 2003) was a Scottish folk and blues singer and guitarist, who recorded in the 1960s.

== Life and career ==
Hand was born near Edinburgh, the youngest of five children. He left school at 13 and worked in coal mining, before being employed at sea on whaling ships. His early work experiences contributed towards developing his socialist politics and his appreciation of the natural world, reflected in some of his later songs. During National Service in the Royal Army Dental Corps, he learned both boxing and the guitar.

He began performing in Edinburgh in the company of fellow musicians including Len Partridge, Archie Fisher, Roy Guest, and Bert Jansch, and gave his first solo performance in 1962 as part of the Edinburgh Festival Fringe. Around 1963 he formed a duo with Robin Williamson of The Incredible String Band and was also a member of The Three City Four with Leon Rosselson, Ralph Trainer and Marian McKenzie, before moving to London where he performed in leading folk clubs including Les Cousins. He recorded two albums for Transatlantic Records, Something New (1965), which included several of his own compositions as well as some written by others; and I Love a Lass (1966), comprising traditional songs arranged by Hand.

After his first marriage ended, he worked on a kibbutz in Israel, and remarried, to Ruth Dunlop. They returned to Edinburgh where they ran a bric-a-brac shop and later a theatrical costume shop. Hand recorded occasionally, notably with Hamish Henderson and folk group the Whistlebinkies on the 1977 album Freedom Come All Ye. He became a mature student under Henderson's guidance at the School of Scottish Studies in Edinburgh University, writing a thesis on the political influences on the folk music revival of the late 1950s, and graduating with a MA degree in 1993.

He was diagnosed with a heart condition and underwent a heart transplant in 1997. He and his wife moved to Coldstream. He died at the age of 64 in 2003.

== Discography ==
- Something New (1965)
- I Love a Lass (1966)
