= Laurence Juber =

English guitarist (born 1952)

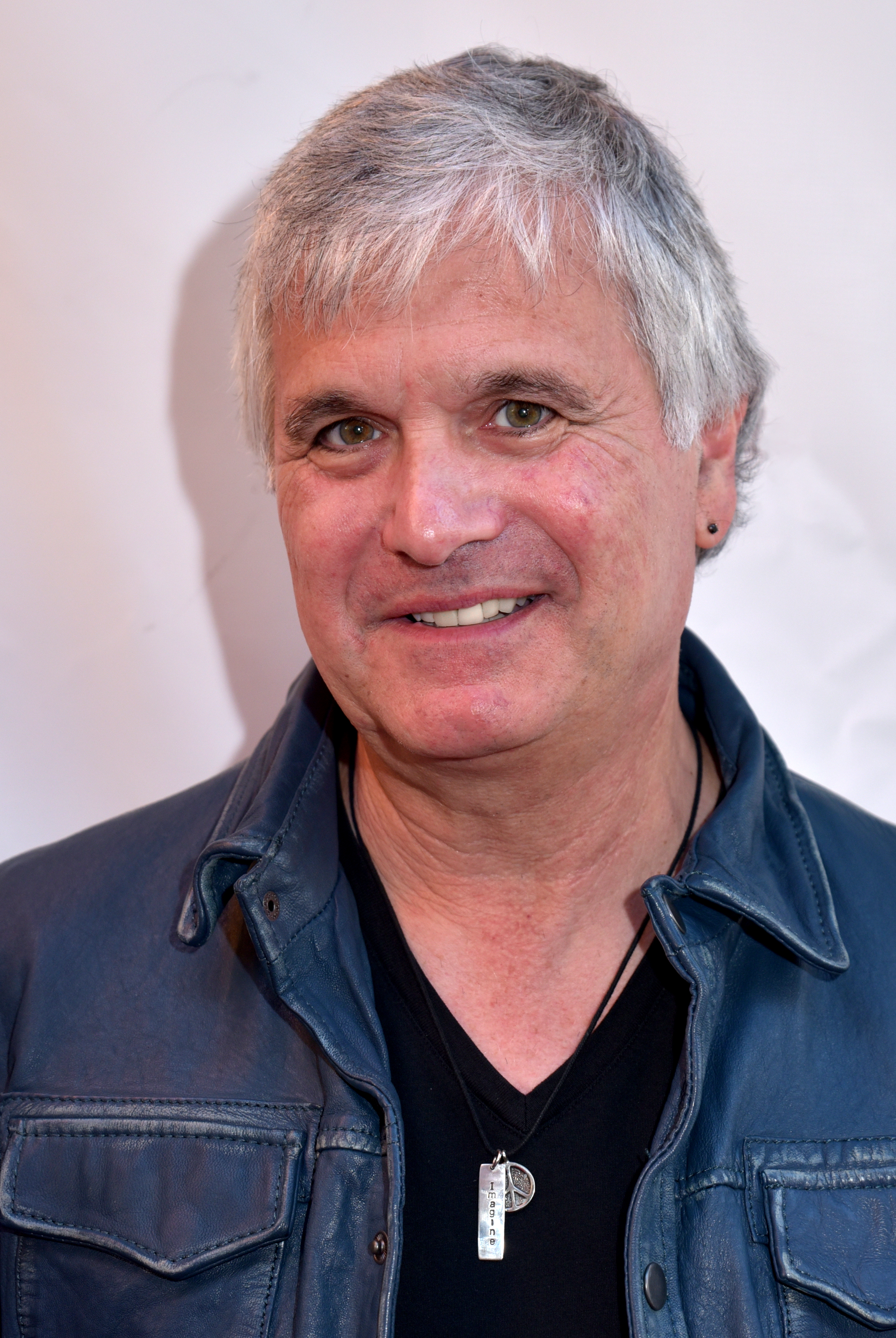
- Laurence Juber arrives for the California Saga 2 Charity Concert in Los Angeles, California, on 3 July 2019.

Background information
- Born: 12 November 1952 (age 74); Stepney, East London, England
- Genres: Pop; rock; folk; country; blues; jazz
- Occupation: Session musician
- Instruments: Guitar; lute
- Years active: 1967–present
- Formerly of: Wings
- Website: laurencejuber.com

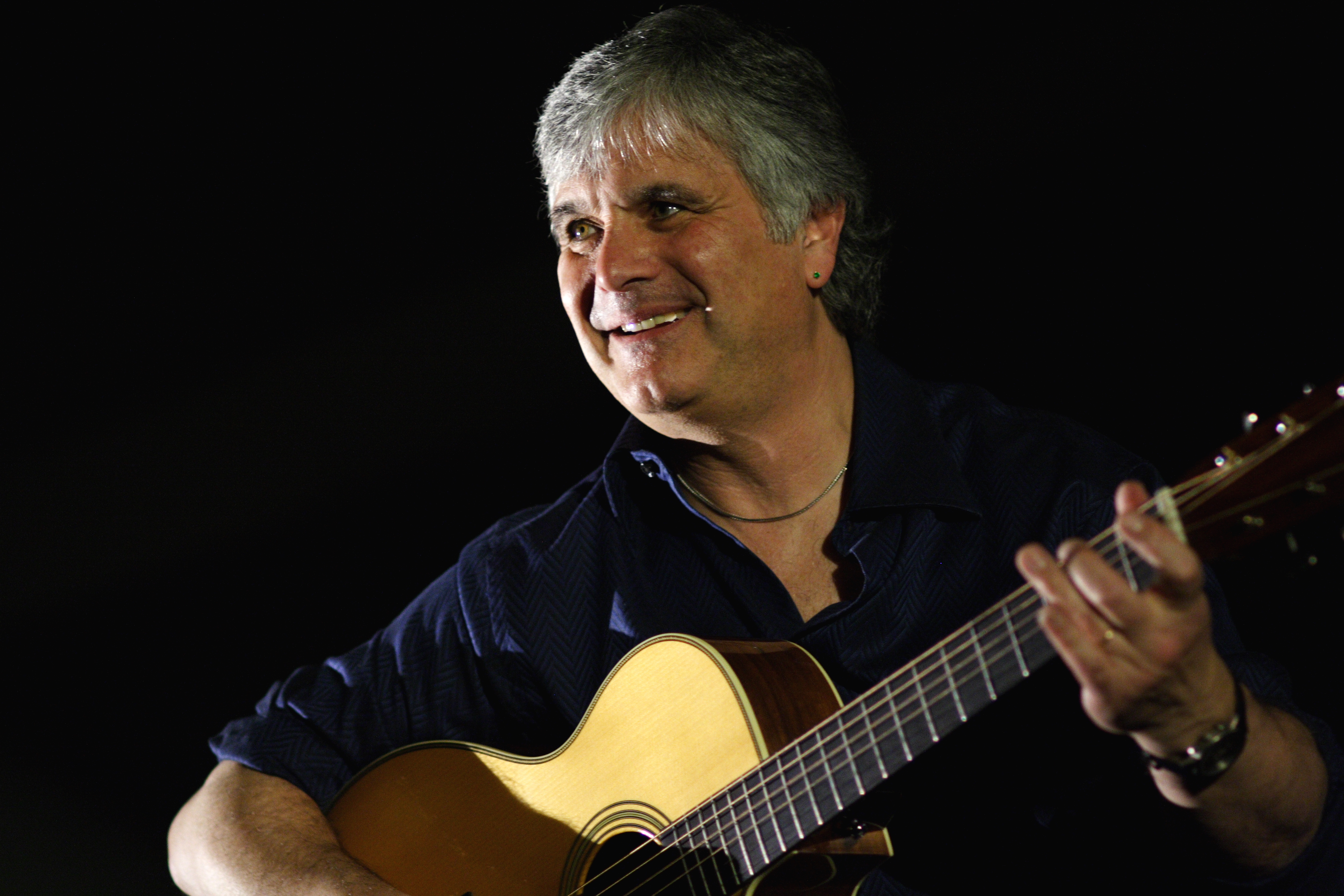
Juber performing in 2009

Laurence Ivor Juber (born 12 November 1952) is an English musician, fingerstyle guitarist and studio musician. He played guitar in the rock band Wings from 1978 to 1981.

== Biography ==
=== Early life ===
Born in Stepney, East London, Juber was raised and went to school in North London. By his own account, he began playing guitar the week that single "I Want to Hold Your Hand" by the Beatles was released. Beginning on a cheap acoustic guitar, he learned to read music early and the system of music notation. He began to earn money playing the guitar at 13, and began to study classical guitar at the age of 15.

=== Studio work in London ===
Enraptured by the sounds on records of the mid- to late 1960s, he set his sights on becoming a session guitarist in London's music studios. While playing with the National Youth Jazz Orchestra, he earned his music degree at London University's Goldsmiths College, where he expanded his horizons by playing the lute. Upon graduation, he immediately began work as a session guitarist, working on his first project with former Beatles producer George Martin on an album for Cleo Laine. In 1977, Juber was booked, along with session drummer Peter Boita, by London-based orchestral contractor David Katz to go to Paris for a week to record Je n'ai pas vu le temps passer... with Charles Aznavour in Barclay Records' studios. Sung entirely in French, the album went on to become one of Aznavour's biggest selling French language albums.

During this time, Juber worked on the 1977 James Bond film The Spy Who Loved Me, as well the first Alan Parsons Project album, Tales of Mystery and Imagination.

=== Wings ===
Juber first met Wings member Denny Laine in late 1977 during filming for a BBC special for singer David Essex. With Wings lead guitarist Jimmy McCulloch having recently departed, Laine added Juber to a list of possible replacements.

Juber gave up his lucrative studio career when invited to join Wings in 1978. Juber later said that he agreed to join immediately "because you don't turn down that kind of job". He played on the band's Back to the Egg album (1979), as well as their subsequent UK tour. In 1980, he garnered his first Grammy Award, when Wings' track "Rockestra Theme" won the award for Best Rock Instrumental.

Juber's first solo album, Standard Time, which he began recording during his time in Wings, was not released until 1982. Like Denny Laine's Holly Days LP, the release comprises covers of material of which McCartney owned the publishing. One track, "Maisie", was written by Juber himself. "Maisie" was recorded by the four male members of the final Wings line-up. The album has not been reissued since its original vinyl release.

=== Life after Wings ===
After Wings disbanded in early 1981, Juber moved to the United States. In New York City, he met his future wife, Hope, and soon moved to her native California. He played on Ringo Starr's 1981 album, Stop and Smell the Roses. He subsequently resumed work as a studio musician and played guitar for numerous television shows, including Happy Days, Family Ties, Home Improvement and 7th Heaven. He composed the music for A Very Brady Christmas (1988), World Gone Wild (1988) and Little Sweetheart (1990). He played guitar on Belinda Carlisle's "Mad About You", Eric Carmen's "Make Me Lose Control" as well as Bill Medley and Jennifer Warnes' "Time of My Life" and Patrick Swayze's "She's Like the Wind" from the Dirty Dancing soundtrack.

Juber co-composed the soundtrack of the award-winning video game Diablo III and crafted the score to the Dateline NBC documentary Children of the Harvest. His music is also featured in the Ken Burns TV documentary The Tenth Inning.

With his wife, Hope Juber, he has composed the scores to the musical comedies Gilligan's Island: The Musical, A Very Brady Musical and It's The Housewives! In addition to his own recording and performances, Juber has produced, arranged and played on Al Stewart's albums Between the Wars (1995), Down in the Cellar (2000), A Beach Full of Shells (2005) and Sparks of Ancient Light (2008), and occasionally performs with Stewart.

In 2014 he released a "photo memoir" Guitar With Wings (published by Dalton Watson Fine Books) which featured previously unpublished pictures of his time working with Paul McCartney.

=== Solo career ===
In 1990, Juber released his second solo album, Solo Flight. During the next decade he would begin to explore altered tunings, especially "DADGAD". In 2000, Juber released the solo album LJ plays the Beatles and The Collection and in 2003 the album Guitarist was released to critical acclaim. Juber's credentials as a top-tier fingerstyle guitarist continue to grow. Having been voted "Guitarist of the Year" by readers of Fingerstyle Guitar magazine, as well as one of the top acoustic players of all time by Acoustic Guitar magazine, Juber is an ambassador for his instrument as well as his own music. He has released many critically acclaimed solo albums, and has earned a second Grammy for Best Pop Instrumental for his solo guitar arrangement of "The Pink Panther Theme" on the CD Henry Mancini: Pink Guitar. Juber has also released a series of instructional CDs that teach basic music theory and arrangement techniques for guitarists and has three folios of his arrangements of pop songs published by Hal Leonard.

=== Personal life ===
Juber is married to former actress Hope Schwartz, whose father Sherwood was producer of Gilligan’s Island and The Brady Bunch—she was a guest multiple times on the latter show. They have two daughters, Nico Juber and songwriter Ilsey Juber.

== Discography ==
- 1982: Standard Time
- 1990: Solo Flight
- 1993: Naked Guitar
- 1995: LJ
- 1997: Winter Guitar
- 1997: Groovemasters with Preston Reed
- 1998: Mosaic
- 1999: Altered Reality
- 2000: LJ Plays the Beatles
- 2000: Naked Solos
- 2000: The Collection
- 2001: Different Times
- 2003: Guitarist
- 2004: Henry Mancini: Pink Guitar
- 2005: One Wing
- 2006: I've Got the World on Six Strings
- 2007: PCH
- 2008: Pop Goes Guitar
- 2009: Wooden Horses
- 2010: LJ Plays the Beatles Vol. 2
- 2011: Children of the Harvest
- 2012: Soul of Light
- 2013: Catch LJ Live!
- 2013: Under an Indigo Sky
- 2015: Fingerboard Road
- 2016: Holidays & Hollynights
- 2017: LJ Can't Stop Playing the Beatles!
- 2018: Touchstones: The Evolution of Fingerstyle Guitar
- 2019: Downtown
- 2020: The Fab 4th
- 2024: A Day in the Life

== Collaborations ==
- Nice to Be Around – Rosemary Clooney (1977)
- Stop and Smell the Roses – Ringo Starr (1981)
- The Four Sides of Buzzy Linhart – Buzzy Linhart (1982, EP)
- Belinda – Belinda Carlisle (1986)
- Barry Manilow – Barry Manilow (1989)
- Between the Wars – Al Stewart (1995)
- Musings – William Goldstein (2016)
- Unleash the Love – Mike Love (2017)
- Fine Line – Harry Styles (2019)
