= Down in the Cellar =

Studio album by Al Stewart
- Released: 17 October 2000 (Europe), February 12, 2001 (US)
- Recorded: May–June 2000
- Studio: Capitol B Studios, Hollywood, CA & Sign of the Scorpion, Studio City, CA
- Genre: Folk
- Label: EMI (Europe)/Miramar (US)
- Producer: Laurence Juber

Al Stewart chronology
Between the Wars (1995)	Down in the Cellar (2000)	A Beach Full of Shells (2005)

Down in the Cellar is the fourteenth studio album by Al Stewart, released in 2000 in Europe by EMI. It was released in 2001 by Miramar in the US. It was re-released in 2007 with bonus tracks by Collectors' Choice Music.

Its primary theme is that of wine, and almost all the songs on the album refer to various varieties of the alcoholic beverage, including Chardonnay and Shiraz.

== Track listing ==
All tracks by Al Stewart except where noted.

1. "Waiting for Margaux" – 4:35
2. "Tasting History" (Laurence Juber, Stewart) – 4:05
3. "Down in the Cellars" – 3:10
4. "Turning It into Water" – 4:36
5. "Soho" (Bert Jansch) – 4:00
6. "The Night That the Band Got the Wine" – 6:09
7. "Millie Brown" – 2:40
8. "Under a Wine-Stained Moon" – 3:34
9. "Franklin's Table" – 4:24
10. "House of Clocks" – 3:00
11. "Sergio" – 3:20
12. "Toutes les Etoiles" – 2:11
13. "The Shiraz Shuffle" (Juber, Stewart) – 1:55

2007 Re-release bonus tracks

- "Dark Side"
- "Belsize Blues"

== Personnel ==
- Simon Boswell – viola
- Ramon Breton – mastering assistant
- Steve Chapman – management
- Jim Cox – piano, organ
- Bruce Dukov – violin
- Joe Gastwirt – mastering
- Dominic Genova – electric bass, bass
- Jimmy Hoyson – assistant
- David P. Jackson – accordion ("Sergio")
- Michael Jochum – percussion, drums
- Laurence Juber – acoustic guitar, arranger, electric guitar, producer, engineer
- Avi Kipper – engineer
- David Low – cello
- Rachel Purkin – violin
- Lori Stoll – photography
- Peter White – accordion ("Toutes Les Etoiles")

== Sources ==
- Down in the Cellar at www.alstewart.com
