= A Beach Full of Shells =

Studio album by Al Stewart
- Released: 21 June 2005
- Genre: Folk
- Length: 48:43
- Label: Appleseed (US), EMI (UK)
- Producer: Laurence Juber

Al Stewart chronology
Down in the Cellar (2000)	A Beach Full of Shells (2005)	Sparks of Ancient Light (2008)

A Beach Full of Shells is the fifteenth studio album by Al Stewart, released in 2005. Like most of Stewart's later works, much of the content of the CD alludes to people or moments in history.

== Historical references ==
- "The Immelman Turn": refers to the aerobatic maneuver of the same name. The narrator, a Barnstormer, pilots a Curtiss "Jenny".
- "Mr. Lear": about the nineteenth-century English poet Edward Lear. Lear's cat Foss is mentioned, and his poems "The Pobble Who Has No Toes" and "Uncle Arly" are referenced.
- "Somewhere in England, 1915": The narrator, living in 2005, dreams many scenes, including the 1945 film Brief Encounter, the British poets Siegfried Sassoon and Wilfred Owen in the trenches of World War I and the last farewell of Violet Asquith (daughter of British Prime Minister H. H. Asquith) and Rupert Brooke. He then wakes up, and sees on that day's newspaper "a man on the cover we all know, defying the fates" who "seems very sure" of himself.
- "Katherine of Oregon": the titular character's name is a play on Catherine of Aragon, whose marriage to King Henry VIII of England was annulled in 1533. The chorus' tune is adapted from the work of Beethoven. The Scottish musician Lonnie Donegan is mentioned. When playing this song in concert, Stewart has jokingly suggested that he may write a sequel entitled "Anne of Cleveland" as a play on Anne of Cleves.

== Class of '58 ==
Stewart originally wrote the song "Class of '58" as 13 minutes long. When the record company rejected it, he rewrote it to the truncated 4-minute version on the album. The long version was subsequently released as a single. In the blurb on the single, it is suggested that the album A Beach Full of Shells was originally intended to focus around this song, which describes the life of a musician on the 1950s rock and roll scene.

== Track listing ==
All songs written by Al Stewart.

No.	Title	Length
1.	"The Immelman Turn"	4:39
2.	"Mr. Lear"	3:00
3.	"Royal Courtship"	4:10
4.	"Rain Barrel"	4:00
5.	"Somewhere in England, 1915"	6:56
6.	"Katherine of Oregon"	3:07
7.	"Mona Lisa Talking"	4:26
8.	"Class of '58"	4:10
9.	"Out in the Snow"	2:51
10.	"My Egyptian Couch"	2:18
11.	"Gina in the Kings Road"	3:49
12.	"Beacon Street"	2:20
13.	"Anniversary"	2:53
