= Roads to Moscow =

Single by Al Stewart

from the album Past, Present and Future
- Released: May 1974 (US); October 1973 (UK)
- Genre: Pop rock
- Length: 8:00 (Album version)
- Label: CBS
- Songwriter: Al Stewart
- Producer: John Anthony

"Roads to Moscow" is a 1973 song by Scottish rock singer Al Stewart. It appeared on his album Past, Present and Future, and tells the story of the German invasion of Russia during World War II, as seen through the eyes of a Russian soldier who is described by one source as being Alexander Solzhenitsyn.

== Lyrics ==
Each verse of the song covers a different phase of the campaign, starting with the invasion by German troops that commenced on 22 June 1941. First comes the attack, the catastrophic destruction of Soviet Air Force aircraft at their aerodromes by the Luftwaffe, and the initial efforts by Soviet soldiers to escape the advancing Nazi horde.

The next portion of the song relates the Russian retreat through Ukraine during the summer and fall of 1941, including the fall of Smolensk, culminating in the approach of the Nazi armies to Moscow during Operation Typhoon. Stewart next describes the onset of winter, with snow and mud proving insurmountable obstacles for the Germans in the Battle of Moscow, following which they were forced to retreat.

The German soldiers are portrayed as walking "in the footsteps of Napoleon", referencing the French Emperor's ill-fated invasion of Russia in 1812.

Next, the song turns to the activities of the Soviet partisans, who waged their own war against the Germans behind German lines. It then references the great Battle of Stalingrad, the turning point of the Second World War for Germany, which led to the destruction of the German Sixth Army and ultimately sealed the fate of the Nazis in the conflict. Two broken Tiger tanks are depicted, flames flickering from their open hatches to signify the destruction of the German armored forces at Kursk and other places during 1943 and 44, and the increasing hopelessness of their military situation.

The song moves on to the Soviet invasion of Germany itself, during which the Germans are able to offer little effective resistance. It speaks of "old men and children" being sent to stop them, but who are unable to do so. Then comes the Battle of Berlin, following which the Germans realize that their "dream" of world domination is over—together with Hitler's reign of terror.

Finally, the song turns to its protagonist, who is eagerly anticipating his return to Russia after four years of fighting. When he crosses the border, however, he is detained by the MGB when they learn that he had been captured by the Germans earlier in the war—even though he was released after only one day. He is separated from his companions and sent to the Gulag, where the song ends as he contemplates the "forever" expanse of the "steely Russian skies" above his camp.

== Composition ==
Stewart carefully researched this song, stating that he read forty to fifty books about the war before writing it.

Stewart said: "The German Invasion of Russia, on the 22nd June 1941, was one of the greatest single events in the history of the world. The hero of 'Roads to Moscow' fights his way first backwards towards Moscow, and then all the way to Berlin, only to be imprisoned by Stalin, as were incalculable millions of others at the end of the Second World War. General Guderian, the Panzer leader, was incidentally perhaps the most imaginative of the early German commanders, and his lightning drives across Poland and France had created the basis for much of the German Army's reputation of invincibility. He was also the only German general to argue with Hitler, during the latter's frequent harangues."

Stewart has indicated at concerts that "Roads to Moscow" is about Russian Nobel-winning writer Alexander Solzhenitsyn.

== See also ==
- List of anti-war songs

== Other reading ==
- Roads to Moscow - Contains historical facts matched with selected lines from the song.
- Songfacts: Roads to Moscow - Songfacts.com entry on this song; includes Stewart's own words about it.
- Story of Stalin's War: Al Stewart's 'Roads to Moscow' - Contains complete lyrics. Also included a video for the song, featuring authentic historical media; the video, now unavailable, may be accessed by right-clicking over the error message, copying the embed code, & using it when querying the Internet Archive Wayback Machine.
