= Year of the Cat (song) =

Single by Al Stewart

from the album Year of the Cat
- B-side: "Broadway Hotel"
- Released: July 1976 (UK); October 1976 (US)
- Recorded: January 1976
- Studio: Abbey Road Studios, London, England
- Genre: Soft rock; progressive pop
- Length: 6:40 (album version); 4:38 (single version)
- Label: RCA (UK); Janus (US)
- Songwriters: Al Stewart, Peter Wood
- Producer: Alan Parsons

Al Stewart singles chronology
"Carol" (1975)	"Year of the Cat" (1976)	"On the Border" (1977)

Official audio
- "Year of the Cat" on YouTube

Audio sample
- "Year of the Cat": file; help

"Year of the Cat" is a song by Scottish singer-songwriter Al Stewart, released as a single in July 1976 in the UK (October 1976 in the US). The song is the title track of his 1976 album Year of the Cat, and was recorded at Abbey Road Studios, London, in January 1976 by engineer Alan Parsons. The song peaked at number 8 on the Billboard Hot 100 for the consecutive weeks of March 5 and 12, 1977. Although Stewart's highest placed single on that chart was 1978's "Time Passages", "Year of the Cat" has remained Stewart's signature recording, receiving regular airplay on both classic rock and folk rock stations.

== Composition ==
Co-written by Peter Wood, "Year of the Cat" is a narrative song written in the second person whose protagonist, a tourist, is visiting an exotic market when a mysterious silk-clad woman appears and takes him away for a gauzy romantic adventure. On waking the next day beside her, the tourist notes that his tour bus has left without him, and decides to stay where he is for the time being.

Per the Financial Times, Stewart's "girlfriend left a book of Vietnamese astrology open at the page for the Year of the Cat, then just beginning, the words fitted the same four notes — and also contained the word 'of'. Stewart was obsessed with Bob Dylan’s 'of' songs — 'Masters of War', 'Chimes of Freedom', and presumably in 1975, 'Simple Twist of Fate' — believing that the preposition made them sound 'portentous'. When he watched Casablanca on television, an opening couplet came to him: “In a morning from a Bogart movie, in a country where they turn back time/ You go strolling through the crowd like Peter Lorre contemplating a crime…”

In the Vietnamese zodiac, the Cat is one of the twelve signs. At the time of the song's release, the most recent Year of the Cat had been 11 February 1975 to 30 January 1976; thus, the song was written and recorded in the Vietnamese Year of the Cat.

The song began as "Foot of the Stage", a song written by Stewart in 1966 after seeing a performance by comedian Tony Hancock whose patter about "being a complete loser" who might as well "end it all right here" drew laughs from the audience: Stewart's intuitive response that Hancock was in genuine despair led to the writing of "Foot of the Stage". It was the melody for this never-recorded song to which Stewart set the lyrics of "Year of the Cat" in 1975. Pianist Peter Wood was given a co-writing credit on the song. Stewart explained Wood's involvement in the creation of "Year of the Cat" during a concert in Edmonds, Washington in November 2017. He recalled that he was opening for Linda Ronstadt during a 1975 tour of the United States and receiving a decidedly mixed reaction from audiences when he noticed the pianist (presumably Wood) using a catchy chord progression during soundchecks. Stewart asked if he could add words to the notes, but the pianist said no. Stewart incorporated the notes into the melodic line of "The Year of the Cat" anyway.

== Recording ==
The track is noted for its lengthy instrumental sections—over four minutes of the 6:40 album version are instrumental, including a long, melodic series of solos that encompass cello, violin, piano, acoustic guitar, distorted electric guitar, synthesizer and saxophone. Tim Renwick plays both the acoustic lead and electric lead and George Ford plays bass. Parsons had Phil Kenzie add the alto saxophone part of the song—and by doing so transformed the original folk concept into the jazz-influenced ballad that put Al Stewart onto the charts.

According to Stewart on an episode of In the Studio with Redbeard (which devoted an episode to the making of the Year of the Cat album), Phil Kenzie was watching a movie and didn't want to be bothered with going to do session work; but as a favour to Alan Parsons he went to Abbey Road, and the sax solos were recorded in one or two takes, after which Kenzie left the studio to go back home and watch the rest of his movie. Stewart also told Redbeard that he didn't like the sax solos at first but grew to like them.

Shorter versions of the track can be found on some European 7" single formats. Though both of the discs carry the same label and catalogue number (RCA PB 5007), the French single features the A-side track clocking in at 4:30, while the Italian one features an even shorter mix of just 3:30 so that the lengthy instrumental intro is completely missing.

Subsequent to the entry of the single on the US charts, the track afforded Stewart a major hit in Australia (no. 13), Belgium/Flemish Region (no. 7), Canada (no. 3), Italy (no. 5), the Netherlands (no. 6) and New Zealand (no. 15). In the UK, where the single had been overlooked on its original July 1976 release, it gained renewed interest which was evident in a Top 40 chart entry although interest levelled off outside the Top 30 with a number 31 peak in January 1977. "Year of the Cat" would remain Stewart's sole chart single in his native UK.

== Structure ==
The song is mainly written in E minor/G major, with the electric guitar solo in the bridge in D major.

== Personnel ==
- Al Stewart – vocals, acoustic guitar
- Tim Renwick – acoustic guitar, electric guitar
- Peter White - acoustic guitar
- Peter Wood – Piano
- Phil Kenzie – alto saxophone
- Don Lobster – keyboards
- George Ford – bass
- Stuart Elliott – drums, percussion
- Bobby Bruce – violin
- Marion Driscoll – triangle
- Andrew Powell – string arrangements

== Chart performance ==
=== Weekly charts ===
Chart (1976–1977)	Peak position
Australia (Kent Music Report)	13
Belgium (Ultratop 50 Flanders)	9
Belgium (Ultratop 50 Wallonia)	18
Canada Top Singles (RPM)	3
Canada RPM Adult Contemporary	6
Netherlands (Single Top 100)	6
Italy	5
New Zealand (Recorded Music NZ)	15
UK Singles (Official Charts)	31
US Billboard Hot 100	8
US Cashbox Top 100	4
US Adult Contemporary (Billboard)	8

=== Year-end charts ===
Chart (1977)	Rank
Australia (Kent Music Report)	82
Canada	42
US Billboard Hot 100	92

== Cover versions ==
Hector recorded the song with his own Finnish lyrics as "Kissojen Yö" on his 1978 album Kadonneet Lapset. The Spanish rendering "El año del gato" was recorded by Érica García for her 2001 album release El cerebro.

A cover version by F. R. David appeared on the 1999 album Words – '99 Version.

The experimental band Psapp recorded a version for the compilation Take It Easy: 15 Soft Rock Anthems in 2006, which contained cat sound effects.

Samples of the song were featured in the 2011 EDM release "Alley Cat" by Volta Bureau.

The song was sampled in Purple Disco Machine's "In My Arms", a non-album single released in 2020.

== Appearances in media ==
Another version of the song, also performed by Stewart, appears on Volume 1 of the Cities 97 Sampler.

The song appears in the film version of Running with Scissors (2006) and in the film Radiofreccia (1998), the directorial debut of Italian rock star Luciano Ligabue.

In 2013, the song was used during the end credits of "The Dinner" episode of HBO show Hello Ladies.

In 2008, the song was used during the open credits of Freeform show Year of the Cat.

The song is used frequently as bumper music on the late-night radio talk show Coast to Coast AM.

The song also appears in the German film Die Katze.

In the 70s, the song contributed to the surge in the global awareness of the mint plant, patchouli, used as an essential oil with a reference to it in the third line of the verse in the bridge, "She comes in incense and patchouli".

A sample of the song was used in the production of the underground hip-hop artist Ostrich Head's "Greener Fences".
