= Pete Morgan =

Colin Peter Morgan (7 July 1939 – 5 July 2010) was a British poet, lyricist and television documentary author and presenter.

Born in Leigh, Lancashire, Morgan began his career as a poet in the mid-1950s when he was 16 and living alone in London. He entered the British Army and rose to the rank of infantry platoon commander while serving with the Loyal Regiment (North Lancashire) in West Germany, but began to question this career choice. By the mid-1960s he had become a pacifist and resigned his commission. In 1964 he moved to Edinburgh, where he started to publish his poems and to perform recitals in public. He returned to the North of England in 1971, but this time to Yorkshire's North Riding, to live and work in the fishing village of Robin Hood's Bay, near Whitby.

Over the years Morgan emphasised the oral tradition of poetry and song. Some of his poems have been set to music and have been recorded by such artists as Al Stewart ("My Enemies Have Sweet Voices" on the 1970 Zero She Flies album), the McCalmans and most recently the Levellers, by 'Is This Art'. (During his 1999 UK tour, Al Stewart invited Morgan to read the lyrics as he performed the above song in the City Varieties music hall show at Leeds on 7 November).

Morgan's BBC Television series A Voyage Between Two Seas (1983) presented a journey across Northern England via the region's waterways. His later TV programme The Grain Run was about the Roman supply route from East Anglia to the Yorkshire town of Aldborough.

== Works ==
Poetry collections

- 1973: The Grey Mare Being the Better Steed, Martin Secker & Warburg
- 1979: The Spring Collection, Secker & Warburg
- 1980: One Greek Alphabet, including a sequence of poems commissioned by the Ilkley Literature Festival; illustrated by Hella Basu; Ceolfrith Press
- 1983: A Winter Visitor, Secker & Warburg
- 2005: August Light ISBN 1-904614-23-X

Other

- 1968: "A Big Hat Or What?", his first pamphlet, the Kevin Press
- 1971: work included in Poetry: Introduction 2, part of Faber & Faber's "Poetry: Introduction" series
- 2001: Talking Cello, writer, researcher and presenter for the programme on BBC Radio 4 in collaboration with the cellist Tony Moore, featuring a number of Morgan's poems
- The Other Wittgenstein, writer, researcher and presenter for the programme on BBC Radio 4
- Away, pamphlet published in 2003 by Driftwood Publications, 44a Merrilocks Road, Blundellsands, Liverpool L23 6UW
