= Bed-Sitter Images =

Bedsitter Images
- Original album cover - 1967

Studio album by Al Stewart
- Released: 6 October 1967
- Recorded: September 1967
- Genre: Folk; baroque folk
- Length: 41:28 (1967 release)
- Label: CBS
- Producer: Roy Guest

Al Stewart chronology
Bedsitter Images (1967)	Love Chronicles (1969)

Alternative cover
- Alternate 1970 UK release

Professional ratings
Review scores
Source	Rating
Allmusic	2.5/5 stars

Bed Sitter Images is the debut studio album of folk artist Al Stewart, released in 1967, and again in a revised edition with a new cover picture in 1970. The songs were orchestrated by Alexander Faris. The cover of the first 1967 edition spells "Bed Sitter" without a hyphen, as do many reviews and Al Stewart's official website. The album and its title track are both named on the record label as Bedsitter Images, with neither hyphen nor space between 'Bed' and 'sitter'.

The album is commercially available as part of a 2-CD box set To Whom It May Concern, which contains Stewart's first three albums as well as both sides of his first single and the tracks added to the 1970 re-release, which also featured a new cover, and was known as The First Album (Bed-Sitter Images). A new CD reissue in 2007 (Collectors' Choice Music) contains all tracks from both versions of the album, plus bonus tracks.

The album has also been released in Japan as The News from Spain (The First Album), with the addition of some later recordings by Stewart.

== Track listing ==
=== 1967 release ===
Side 1

1. "Bedsitter Images" – 3:20
2. "Swiss Cottage Manoeuvres" – 3:59
3. "The Carmichaels" – 2:52
4. "Scandinavian Girl" – 2:35
5. "Pretty Golden Hair" – 3:39
6. "Denise at 16" – 3:18

Side 2

1. "Samuel, Oh How You've Changed" – 4:00
2. "Cleave to Me" – 2:53
3. "A Long Way Down from Stephanie" – 3:27
4. "Ivich" – 4:24
5. "Beleeka Doodle Day" – 6:57

=== 1970 UK re-release ===
All songs written by Al Stewart except where noted

Side 1

1. "Lover Man" (Mike Heron) – 2:31
2. "Swiss Cottage Manoeuvres" – 3:59
3. "The Carmichaels" – 2:52
4. "Clifton in the Rain" – 2:41
5. "Bed Sitter Images" – 3:20

Side 2

1. "Denise at 16" – 3:18
2. "Samuel, Oh How You've Changed!" – 4:00
3. "A Long Way Down from Stephanie" – 3:27
4. "Ivich" – 4:24
5. "Beleeka Doodle Day" – 6:57

=== 2007 Collectors' Choice Music edition bonus tracks ===
- "Go Your Way" – 1:51
- "My Contemporaries" (Pete Townshend) – 0:30

== Personnel ==
- Al Stewart – guitar, vocals
- Alexander Faris – conductor, orchestral arrangements

=== Technical ===
- Mike Claydon – engineer
- Sophie Litchfield – photography
