= Je n'ai pas vu le temps passer... =

Studio album by Charles Aznavour
- Released: 1978
- Genre: Chanson
- Length: 49:03
- Label: Barclay
- Producer: Del Newman and others (orchestration)

Charles Aznavour chronology
Voilà que tu reviens (1976)	Je n'ai pas vu le temps passer... (1978)	Un enfant est né... (1978)

Je n'ai pas vu le temps passer... ("I Didn't See the Time Go By...") is the 28th French studio album by the French-Armenian singer Charles Aznavour, released in 1978.

== History ==
In 1978 the album became No 1 on TOP 50 of France (for 49 weeks).

The album includes songs by Charles Aznavour, Georges Garvarentz and others. It was reissued by EMI.

== Track listing ==
1. Avant la guerre
2. Je n'ai pas vu le temps passer
3. J'ai vu Paris
4. Ne t'en fais pas
5. La Chanson du faubourg
6. Dans ta chambre il y a
7. Camarade
8. Les Amours médicales
9. Un corps
10. Je ne connais que toi

== Track listing of the 1995 CD Reissue ==
1. Ave Maria (Charles Aznavour / Georges Garvarentz)
2. Un Enfant Est Né (Charles Aznavour / Georges Garvarentz)
3. Je Ne Comprends Pas (Charles Aznavour / Jacques Plante)
4. Noël d'Autrefois (Charles Aznavour / Jacques Plante)
5. Papa Calypso (Charles Aznavour / Herbert Kretzmer / Jacques Plante)
6. Comment C'est Fait La Neige? (Charles Aznavour / Jacques Plante)
7. Noël à Paris (Charles Aznavour / Jacques Plante)
8. Un Enfant de Toir Pour Noël (Charles Aznavour / Georges Garvarentz)
9. Noël au Saloon (Charles Aznavour / Jacques Plante)
10. Hosanna! (Charles Aznavour)
11. Avant La Guerre (Charles Aznavour)
12. Je N'Ai Pas Vu le Temps Passer (Charles Aznavour)
13. J'Ai Vu Paris (Charles Aznavour)
14. Ne T'En Fais Pas (Charles Aznavour / Guy Bontempelli)
15. Camarade (Charles Aznavour / Jacques Plante)

== Personnel ==
- Charles Aznavour - Author, Composer, Vocals
- Georges Garvarentz - Composer
- Guy Bontempelli - Composer
- Aldo Franck - Orchestration
- André Gomet - Photography
- Herbert Kretzmer - Composer
- Peter Duval Lee - Orchestration
- Alain Marouani - Photography
- Del Newman - Orchestration
- Jacques Plante - Composer
- Gabriel Yared - Orchestration
- Peter Boita - Drums
- Laurence Juber - Guitar
