= Sparks of Ancient Light =

Studio album by Al Stewart
- Released: 15 September 2008
- Genre: Folk
- Label: Appleseed (US), EMI (UK)
- Producer: Laurence Juber

Al Stewart chronology
A Beach Full of Shells (2005)	Sparks of Ancient Light (2008)	Uncorked (2009)

Professional ratings
Review scores
Source	Rating
Allmusic	3.5/5 stars

Sparks of Ancient Light is the sixteenth studio album by Al Stewart, released on 15 September 2008. Like many of Stewart's works, the album's songs deal with historical figures, including British prime minister Lord Salisbury, deposed Shah of Iran Mohammad Reza Pahlavi and 34th U.S. President Dwight D. Eisenhower. According to Stewart, the songs all deal with the themes of "certainty and uncertainty." A music video for "Elvis at the Wheel," shot in Arizona, was released in December 2013.

== Critical reception ==
Allmusic reviewer Richie Unterberger praised the production on the album. He wrote: "Stewart's principal strengths – pleasant haunting melodies, mellifluous vocals, accomplished folk guitar work, and literate, historical-minded lyrics – stand at the forefront, undiminished by extraneous arrangements."

== Track listing ==
1. "Lord Salisbury" - 3:26
2. "(A Child's View Of) The Eisenhower Years" - 3:11
3. "The Ear of the Night" - 3:06
4. "Hanno the Navigator" - 4:17
5. "Shah of Shahs" - 5:03
6. "Angry Bird" - 2:42
7. "The Loneliest Place on the Map" - 3:31
8. "Sleepwalking" - 4:31
9. "Football Hero" - 5:38
10. "Elvis at the Wheel" - 3:10
11. "Silver Kettle" - 3:56
12. "Like William McKinley" - 4:15

== Personnel ==
=== Musicians ===
- Laurence Juber - Guitar (Acoustic), Guitar (Electric)
- Jim Cox - Organ, Piano
- John "Hot Fat Reynolds" Ferraro - Percussion, Drums
- Eric Gorfain - Violin
- Daphne Chen - Violin
- Leah Katz - Viola
- Richard Dodd - Cello
- Rick Baptist - Trumpet

=== Production ===
- Laurence Juber - Arranger, Producer, Engineer
- Greg Townley - Engineer, Mixing
- Joe Gastwirt - Mastering
- Buzz Person - Photography
- Aaron Walk - Assistant
- Steve Chapman - Management

== Allusions and historical references ==
- Lord Salisbury is a reference to Robert Cecil, who served as Prime Minister of the United Kingdom from 1895 to 1902. According to Stewart, Cecil led the last "truly patrician government in England and ... believed that England was destined to rule the world."
- Hanno the Navigator is a reference to Hanno the Navigator, a 5th-century BCE Carthaginian explorer best known for his naval exploration of the African coast.
- Elvis at the Wheel refers to an incident where Elvis Presley, looking at a cloud formation, perceived a face of Joseph Stalin changing into that of Jesus, inspiring him to undergo a religious transformation.
- Shah Of Shahs is a reference to the last days of the Pahlavi dynasty before the Islamic revolution, and Shah Mohammad Reza Pahlavi's 1979 escape from Iran.
