= 24 Carrots =

Studio album by Al Stewart
- Released: 20 August 1980
- Recorded: May 1980
- Studio: Davlen Studios, Los Angeles
- Genre: Rock
- Length: 41:14
- Label: RCA
- Producer: Chris Desmond, Al Stewart

Al Stewart chronology
Time Passages (1978)	24 Carrots (1980)	Live/Indian Summer (1981)

24 Carrots is the ninth studio album by Al Stewart, released in 1980. It was Stewart's first album with his new band Shot in the Dark. Tracks 1–4 are co-written with Peter White. The single "Midnight Rocks" reached #24 on the Billboard chart in 1980. Two other singles were released from the album: "Mondo Sinistro" and "Paint By Numbers". The album has been re-released in 2007 with bonus tracks and in 2020 for its 40th anniversary.

Three music videos were created for the singles, with them featuring Stewart and backing band Shot in the Dark playing in a typical band set-up, although the "Mondo Sinistro" video also featured Stewart in some quirky restaurant scenes hitting on a young waitress (played by Cassandra Peterson, prior to her fame as Elvira, Mistress of the Dark).

== Reception ==
Professional ratings
Review scores
Source	Rating
AllMusic	4.5/5 stars

Allmusic's retrospective review assessed 24 Carrots as being the last album in Al Stewart's classic period. They felt that unlike the other three albums from this period, some songs did not quite work, but that the numerous brilliant moments (mentioning particularly "Running Man", "Midnight Rocks", and "Mondo Sinistro") and the consistently elegant production make the drop in quality from those three albums small enough to group 24 Carrots in with them.

== Track listing ==
All tracks composed by Al Stewart except where noted.

=== 1980 original LP ===
Side one
No.	Title	Writer(s)	Length
1.	"Running Man"	Stewart, Peter White	5:12
2.	"Midnight Rocks"	Stewart, White	3:57
3.	"Constantinople"	Stewart, White	4:44
4.	"Merlin's Time"	Stewart, White	2:43
5.	"Mondo Sinistro"		3:07

Side Two
No.	Title	Writer(s)	Length
1.	"Murmansk Run" / "Ellis Island"		7:18
2.	"Rocks in the Ocean"	(Note: The liner notes to the album state that this song is based on the traditional tune "The Bold Fisherman", which has no attributed writer, so the official writing credit goes solely to Al Stewart. The lyrics were written by Stewart.)	5:15
3.	"Paint by Numbers"		5:29
4.	"Optical Illusion"		3:24
Total length:			41:09

=== 1994 Razor & Tie edition bonus tracks ===
No.	Title	Writer(s)	Length
1.	"Here in Angola"		4:39
2.	"Pandora"	Stewart, White	4:37
3.	"Indian Summer"		3:33
Total length:			53:58

=== 2007 Collector's Choice Music edition bonus tracks ===
No.	Title	Writer(s)	Length
1.	"Candy Come Back"	Stewart, White	3:44
2.	"The Ringing of Bells"		4:15
3.	"Tonton Macoute"		4:11
Total length:			53:19

=== 2020 Esoteric Recordings (Cherry Red UK) 40th Anniversary 3CD set ===
CD1
No.	Title	Writer(s)	Length
1.	"Running Man"	Stewart, White	5:11
2.	"Midnight Rocks"	Stewart, White	3:54
3.	"Constantinople"	Stewart, White	4:40
4.	"Merlin's Time"	Stewart, White	2:44
5.	"Mondo Sinistro"		6:05
6.	"Murmansk Run" / "Ellis Island"		7:13
7.	"Rocks in the Ocean"		5:12
8.	"Paint by Numbers"		5:29
9.	"Optical Illusion"		3:30

Bonus tracks
No.	Title	Writer(s)	Length
10.	"Running Man" (single version)	Stewart, White	3:45
11.	"Paint By Numbers" (single version)		4:16
Total length:			51:59

CD2 (Demo Sessions for 24 Carrots – Davlen Studios LA – August 1979 – Previously Unreleased)
No.	Title	Writer(s)	Length
1.	"Midnight Rocks"	Stewart, White	3:31
2.	"Murmansk Run" / "Ellis Island"		7:04
3.	"Running Man" (instrumental demo)	Stewart, White	6:14
4.	"Paint By Numbers"		5:12
5.	"Jackdaw"		3:19
6.	"The World Goes to Riyadh"		3:10
7.	"Merlin's Time" (instrumental demo)	Stewart, White	1:10
8.	"Ringing of Bells"		4:15
Total length:			33:55

CD3 (Live at Hammersmith Odeon – London – December 10, 1980 – Previously Unreleased)
No.	Title	Writer(s)	Length
1.	"Running Man"	Stewart, White	6:07
2.	"Time Passages"	Stewart, White	6:23
3.	"Broadway Hotel"		3:41
4.	"Mondo Sinistro"		3:18
5.	"Roads To Moscow"		7:53
6.	"On the Border"		4:27
7.	"Year of the Cat"	Stewart, Peter Wood	10:21
8.	"If It Doesn’t Come Naturally, Leave It"		4:26
Total length:			46:36

== Personnel ==
- Al Stewart – lead vocals, acoustic and electric guitars, synthesizer

Shot in the Dark

- Peter White – keyboards, acoustic and electric guitars
- Adam Yurman – electric guitar, backing vocals
- Robin Lamble – bass, acoustic guitar, percussion, backing vocals
- Krysia Kristianne – backing vocals
- Bryan Savage – alto saxophone, flute

Additional musicians

- Harry Stinson – backing vocals
- Ken Nicol – backing vocals
- Bob Marlette – keyboards
- Russ Kunkel – drums
- Mark Sanders – drums
- Jeff Porcaro – drums
- Steve Chapman – drums
- Beau Segal – drums
- Lenny Castro – congas
- Robin Williamson – mandocello on "Rocks in the Ocean"
- Sylvia Woods – Celtic harp on "Rocks in the Ocean"
- Jerry McMillan – violin on "Rocks in the Ocean"

== Charts ==
Chart (1980)	Position
Australia (Kent Music Report)	51
Canada (RPM 100 Albums)	49
United States (Billboard 200)	37
