= Russians & Americans =

Studio album by Al Stewart
- Released: May 1984
- Studios: Cherokee Studios (Hollywood, CA); Orca Studios (Encino, CA); Abbey Road Studios (London); Kendun Recorders (Burbank, CA)
- Genre: Pop
- Length: 38:23 (Passport release); 37:06 (RCA release)
- Labels: UK: RCA (original release); EMI (1993 reissue); US: Passport (original release); Collectors' Choice Music (2007 reissue)
- Producer: Mike Flicker

Al Stewart chronology
Live/Indian Summer (1981)	Russians & Americans (1984)	Last Days of the Century (1988)

Russians & Americans is the tenth studio album by the British singer-songwriter Al Stewart, released in May 1984. The album featured many of the musicians from his short-lived backing band, Shot In The Dark, along with a number of studio musicians. The album was released on LP and then CD in both the United Kingdom and the United States. The US version deleted two tracks found on the UK version of the album and substituted two new tracks in their stead. In 1993, EMI (UK) released a compilation with tracks from both versions and three live tracks from "The Blue Album". The album was re-released on the Collector's Choice label in 2007, with all tracks from both issues.

The track "1-2-3" is a cover of the Len Barry hit from 1965. However, instead of the romantic lyrics put forth with the original, Stewart has altered them using the context of political overreach and how such victimises other nations and indigenous peoples. In fact, very few of the song's lines escape change excepting: "One, two, three, that's how elementary it's gonna be" and "...Like taking candy from a baby."

Known for his songs that use historical events as inspiration, Stewart instead focused on the very real tensions between the two superpowers of 1983.

== Track listings ==
=== Original UK LP and original France CD (released 1984 on RCA) ===
Side 1

1. "Lori, Don't Go Right Now" (Al Stewart, Peter White)
2. "Rumours of War" (Stewart, White)
3. "The Gypsy and the Rose" (Stewart)
4. "Accident on 3rd Street" (Stewart)

Side 2

1. "Strange Girl" (Stewart)
2. "Russians & Americans" (Stewart)
3. "Cafe Society" (Stewart)
4. "One, Two, Three (1, 2, 3)" (John Medora, David White, Leonard Borisoff)
5. "The Candidate" (Stewart)

=== Original US LP (released 1984 on Passport) ===
The US version of Russians & Americans replaces "Lori, Don't Go Right Now" and "The Gypsy and the Rose" with "The One that Got Away" and "Night Meeting".

Side 1

1. "The One that Got Away" (Stewart, White)
2. "Rumours of War"
3. "Night Meeting" (Stewart)
4. "Accident on 3rd Street"

Side 2

1. "Strange Girl"
2. "Russians & Americans"
3. "Cafe Society"
4. "One, Two, Three (1, 2, 3)"
5. "The Candidate"

=== 1993 CD UK - EMI 0777 7 89664 25 ===
This CD reissue contains all 11 tracks from both the US and UK versions of the album, plus three live tracks.

1. "The One that Got Away"
2. "Rumours of War"
3. "Night Meeting"
4. "Accident on the 3rd Street"
5. "Strange Girl"
6. "Russians & Americans"
7. "Cafe Society"
8. "One, Two, Three (1-2-3)"
9. "The Candidate"
10. "The Gypsy and the Rose"
11. "Lori, Don't Go Right Now"
12. "Valentina Way"
13. "Year Of The Cat"
14. "Pink Panther/Song On The Radio"

=== 1994 CD US - EMI 0777 7 89664 25 ===
This CD reissue contains all 11 tracks from both the US and UK versions of the album.

1. "The One that Got Away"
2. "Rumours of War"
3. "Night Meeting"
4. "Accident on the 3rd Street"
5. "Strange Girl"
6. "Russians & Americans"
7. "Cafe Society"
8. "One, Two, Three (1-2-3)"
9. "The Candidate"
10. "The Gypsy and the Rose"
11. "Lori, Don't Go Right Now"

=== 2007 CD reissue (released on Collector's Choice) ===
This CD reissue contains all 11 tracks from both the US and UK versions of the album, plus three bonus tracks.

1. "The One that Got Away"
2. "Rumours of War"
3. "Night Meeting"
4. "Accident on the 3rd Street"
5. "Strange Girl"
6. "Russians & Americans"EMI
7. "Cafe Society"
8. "One, Two, Three (1-2-3)"
9. "The Candidate"
10. "The Gypsy and the Rose"
11. "Lori, Don't Go Right Now"
12. "In Red Square"* (Stewart, White)
13. "How Does It Happen"* (Stewart)
14. "The World According to Garp"* (Stewart)

* Bonus Tracks

== Personnel ==
- Al Stewart - vocals, acoustic guitar, electric guitar, keyboards
- Denny Carmassi - drums
- Steve Chapman - drums
- Lynn Davis - backing vocals
- Mike Fisher - percussion
- Mike Flicker - percussion
- Joyce Kennedy - backing vocals
- Phil Kenzie - saxophone
- Robin Lamble - bass, acoustic guitar, accordion
- Marcy Levy - backing vocals
- Marc "Caz" Macino - harmonica
- Charity McCrary - backing vocals
- Harry Stinson - drums
- Peter White - accordion, acoustic guitar, electric guitar, keyboards
- Adam Yurman - electric guitar

== Charts ==
Chart (1982)	Position
Australia (Kent Music Report)	50
