= Dave Nachmanoff =

American folk singer-songwriter (born 1964)

David Nachmanoff (born July 23, 1964) is an American folk singer-songwriter and the sideman to Al Stewart. At the age of ten (circa 1975) he played with Elizabeth Cotten, garnering a positive review in The Washington Star.

== Biography ==
Nachmanoff is originally from a Jewish family from Northern Virginia and currently makes his home in Davis, California. He is the brother of screenwriter-director Jeffrey Nachmanoff. He earned a Ph.D. in Philosophy from the University of California, Davis. He has several solo releases and other collaborations available, and in 2009, appears with Al Stewart on Uncorked – Al Stewart Live with Dave Nachmanoff. In 2011, he released his first album in five years, Step Up, featuring musicians Bob Malone (John Fogerty), Ian Sheridan (Jason Mraz), and Victor Bisetti (Los Lobos), and vocalists Al Stewart, Rosemary Butler, John Wicks (singer) (of The Records) and Liz Bligan. The CD was produced by Ronan Chris Murphy. In 2016, he released Spinoza's Dream, a philosophically themed album featuring many of the backing musicians from Al Stewart's Year of the Cat album. The album was produced by Martin Levan. In 2019, he released Cerulean Sky, produced by Bill Smith.

Notable festivals that he has performed at include the Northern VA Folk Festival (Arlington, VA), National Folk Life Festival (DC), Napa Valley Music Festival (Napa, CA), High Sierra Festival (Bear Valley, CA), Northwest Folklife Festival (Seattle, WA), Juan de Fuca Festival of the Arts (Pt. Angeles, WA), Kerrville Festival (Kerrville, TX), Tucson Folk Festival (Tucson, AZ) and South Florida Folk Festival (Ft Lauderdale). Notable music venues at which he has performed include the Great American Music Hall (San Francisco, CA), the Royal Albert Hall (London, UK), the Freight and Salvage (Berkeley, CA), Kuumbwa Jazz Center (Santa Cruz, CA), the Birchmere (Alexandria, VA), Club Passim (Cambridge, MA), the Sweetwater (Mill Valley, CA), The Bottom Line (New York, NY), and the Woodstock Opera House (Woodstock, IL).

As a side player (guitar, piano, bass, accordion and more) he has worked with Al Stewart on a regular basis, as well as many others at venues as far ranging as The Bottom Line and the Edmonton Folk Festival. He has shared the stage with Cheryl Wheeler, Steve Forbert, the Pogues, America, Alison Krauss and many more.

== Discography ==
=== Albums ===
- Dweller on the Threshold (1993, Troubador)
- Down on the Soundfarm (1994, Troubador)
- Candy Shower (1997, Orchard)
- Snapshots (1998, Orchard)
- A Certain Distance (2001, Troubador)
- Holy Smokes: Ice Cream For Breakfast (2002, Troubador)
- Threads of Time (2004, Troubador)
- In The Family (2004, Troubador)
- Wordless Rhymes (2005, Troubador)
- Time Before The Fall (2006, Troubador)
- Uncorked (Live with Dave Nachmanoff) (with Al Stewart) (2009, Wallaby Trails Recordings)
- Step Up (2011, Troubador)
- Spinoza's Dream (2016, Troubador)
- Cerulean Sky (2019, Troubadour)

== Awards ==
- Just Plain Folks Awards (2001) Songwriter of the Year, New Folk Album of the Year, Gospel Song of the Year, 3rd place Best Live Album, 3rd place Best Male Singer/songwriter, 4th place Best Blues Song, 6th place Best Traditional Folk Song.
- South Florida Folk Festival, 2002 Best Overall
- South Florida Folk Festival, Finalist, 1998, 1999, 2000, 2001
- Tucson Folk Festival, National Songwriting Competition (2nd Place), 1999; judge (2000)
- Portland Songwriting Association (2001) – Best Overall Song, 1st and 3rd Place in Folk
- SAMMIE Nomination – Best Folk Act (1999)
