= Song on the Radio =

Single by Al Stewart

from the album Time Passages
- B-side: "A Man for All Seasons"
- Released: January 1979
- Genre: Pop rock
- Length: 4:10
- Label: Arista Records 0389
- Songwriter: Al Stewart
- Producer: Alan Parsons

Al Stewart singles chronology
"Time Passages" (1978)	"Song on the Radio" (1979)	"Midnight Rocks" (1980)

"Song on the Radio" is a composition by Al Stewart introduced on his 1978 album release Time Passages.

== Background ==
Al Stewart on Song on the Radio
"I was kind of making fun of Arista Records" who had "asked for a mid-tempo ballad with a saxophone...They wanted a song that could be played on the radio, [so] very tongue-in-cheek I wrote...'Song on the Radio'. I thought they'd [get that] I was actually joking, but of course they didn't & ...put it out as a single [which] made the Top 30, [so] the joke was on me because I screwed up a preposition" - referring to the opening lines "I was making my way through the wasteland/ The road into town passes through" which ends with a preposition - "Worse, I used the same word [through] twice in the same sentence."

"Song on the Radio" was released in January 1979 as the second single from the Time Passages album, following the title cut which had been a top ten hit on the Billboard Hot 100 as well as being afforded a ten week tenure at No. 1 on the Billboard Adult Contemporary chart.

"Song on the Radio" would peak at No. 29 on the Hot 100 and rise as high as No. 10 on the Billboard Adult Contemporary chart.

In Canada, "Song on the Radio" also peaked at No. 29 on the national hit parade as ranked by RPM magazine whose Adult Contemporary chart afforded the track a peak of No. 3.

== Chart performance ==
=== Weekly charts ===
Chart (1979)	Peak position
Canada RPM Top Singles	29
Canada RPM Adult Contemporary	3
U.S. Billboard Hot 100	29
U.S. Billboard Adult Contemporary	10
U.S. Cash Box Top 100	27

=== Year-end charts ===
Chart (1979)	Rank
Canada RPM Top Singles	187
