= Between the Wars (Al Stewart album) =

Studio album by Al Stewart
- Released: 8 May 1995
- Recorded: November 1994–March 1995
- Studio: Sign of the Scorpion, Studio City, CA
- Genre: Folk
- Length: 48:44
- Label: Mesa (US), EMI (UK)
- Producer: Laurence Juber

Al Stewart chronology
Famous Last Words (1993)	Between the Wars (1995)	Down in the Cellar (2000)

Professional ratings
Review scores
Source	Rating
Allmusic	2/5 stars

Between the Wars is the thirteenth studio album by Al Stewart, recorded with Laurence Juber. Its major theme is the period "between the wars", from 1918 to 1939. When released it was a critical success but a commercial failure.

== Track listing ==
1. "Night Train to Munich" – 4:25
2. "The Age of Rhythm" – 4:00
3. "Sampan" – 3:37
4. "Lindy Comes to Town" – 4:24
5. "Three Mules" – 5:37
6. "A League of Notions" – 4:17
7. "Life Between the Wars" – 2:47
8. "Betty Boop's Birthday" – 2:05
9. "Marion the Chatelaine" – 3:41
10. "Joe the Georgian" – 3:31
11. "Always the Cause" – 3:18
12. "Laughing into 1939" – 4:15
13. "The Black Danube" – 2:47

The 2007 Collector's Choice re-release has the following additional tracks:

1. "The Bear Farmers of Birnam" – 3:29
2. "Merry Monks" – 1:35

== Historical references ==
- "Night Train to Munich": a 1940 film directed by Carol Reed and starring Rex Harrison bears the same title as this song.
- "Lindy Comes to Town": the titular figure is Charles Lindbergh, who "comes to town" in a 13 June 1927 "ticker-tape parade". US President Calvin Coolidge is referred to, and the Wall Street crash of 1929 is ironically hinted at.
- "Three Mules": tells of British Prime Ministers Ramsay MacDonald, Stanley Baldwin and Neville Chamberlain who did little to prepare Britain for war and downplayed the threat Hitler posed to peace.
- "A League of Notions": the title plays on and refers to the formation and earliest acts of the League of Nations at the 1919 Paris Peace Conference in Versailles. Several historical figures are mentioned, including US President Woodrow Wilson, British Prime Lloyd George, French Prime Minister Georges Clemenceau and T. E. Lawrence (here referred to as "Lawrence of Arabia"). The lyrics bemoan the difficulties of establishing new territorial boundaries for Russia, Germany, Poland, Yugoslavia, Czechoslovakia, Turkey, Persia and Iraq. Churchill's hiccup is mentioned, as are Wilson's Fourteen Points and Clemenceau's historical remark to Lloyd George that "God Himself had only ten."q:Georges Clemenceau
- "Life between the Wars": refers to the time between World War I and II and some of its influential figures. It is told how a certain Paul Gervaise is seeing a picture of Zelda Fitzgerald, wife of The Great Gatsby author F. Scott Fitzgerald, when he reads the New York Herald. It also refers to English writer Somerset Maugham and mentions French fashion designer Coco Chanel who returns to London from a holiday with a suntan. In the end the song alludes to King Edward VIII whose intention to marry divorced American socialite Wallis Simpson led to his abdication (Abdication of Edward VIII) as King of The United Kingdom that's why he is leaving Buckingham Palace. The song shows how personal interests became more important than traditions and institutions in this period of time.
- "Marion the Chatelaine": refers to Marion Davies, the mistress of American newspaper baron William Randolph Hearst.
- "Betty Boop's Birthday": an instrumental. Betty Boop was a cartoon character popular in the 1930s; in 1933, she appeared in the short film Betty Boop's Birthday Party.
- "Joe the Georgian": Tells of Soviet officers waiting in Hell for Joseph Stalin, the titular Georgian, to arrive. "We're sharpening our pitchforks/And we're heating up the ends," the narrator declares, adding that he hopes Stalin "likes the next few million years." The second verse invokes the metaphor of a literal "ship of state", referring to Vladimir Lenin as "the captain" who became sick, whereupon Stalin, the "mate", took over. Soviet historical figures Lev Kamenev, Grigory Zinoviev and Nikolai Bukharin are described as already being in amongst those waiting in the "anteroom to Hell".
- "Always the Cause": about the Spanish Civil War. Dolores Ibarruri, "La Pasionara", is mentioned, as is her slogan ¡No pasarán!. The narrator declares that "Tonight I saw Guernica burn."
- "The Black Danube": an instrumental. The Danube River originates in Germany's Black Forest.

== Musicians ==
- Al Stewart – vocal, guitar, woodblock, synth strings
- Laurence Juber – guitars, banjo, six string bass, dobro, mandolin, synth strings
- Bobby Bruce – violin
- Tim Landers – acoustic bass guitar
- Sam Riney – clarinet, soprano sax
- Guy Babylon – synth strings, tack piano
- Steve Forman – percussion
- Suzoe Katayama – cello, accordion
- Domenic Genova – arco bass
- Herman Beeftink – piano, synth strings
- James Hutchinson – bass
- Jim Keltner – drums
- Robin Lamble – backing vocals
- Andrew Powell – synth strings
- Richard Evans – Sleeve Design
