= Time Passages (song) =

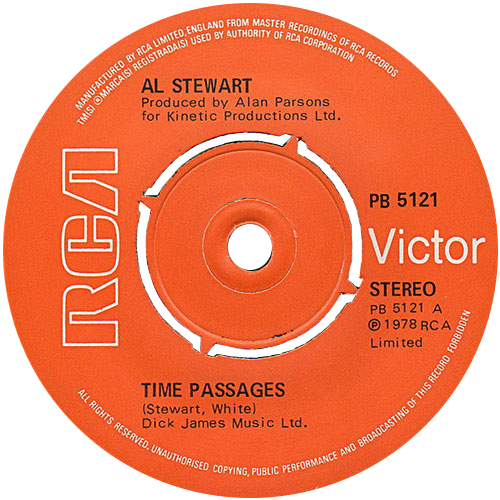
- Side A of the UK single

Single by Al Stewart

from the album Time Passages
- B-side: "Almost Lucy"
- Released: September 1978
- Genre: Soft rock
- Length: 6:39 (album version); 4:39 (single edit)
- Label: Arista
- Songwriters: Al Stewart, Peter White
- Producer: Alan Parsons

Al Stewart singles chronology
"On the Border" (1977)	"Time Passages" (1978)	"Song on the Radio" (1979)

"Time Passages" is a song by British singer-songwriter Al Stewart, released as a single in 1978. It was produced by Alan Parsons and is the title track of Stewart's 1978 album release. The single reached No. 7 on the Billboard Hot 100 chart in December 1978, and also spent ten weeks at No. 1 on the U.S. Billboard Easy Listening chart, the longest stay at number one on this chart in the 1970s. Billboard magazine also ranked "Time Passages" as the No. 1 Adult Contemporary single of 1979.

The familiar final line to the chorus is, "Buy me a ticket on the last train home tonight". Less lyrically complex than a typical Al Stewart composition – the singer's previous top ten hit "Year of the Cat" exemplifying his usual style – "Time Passages" was one of two songs on the Time Passages album written by Stewart with the intent of the tracks' having hit single potential, the other being "Song on the Radio" which was the follow-up single and reached No. 29 Billboard and No. 27 Cash Box. The song describes the singer planning a trip home in late December (presumably for Christmas) and his nostalgic memories of the past.

== Chart performance ==
=== Weekly charts ===
Chart (1978–1979)	Peak position
Australia (Kent Music Report)	36
Canada RPM Top Singles	10
Canada RPM Adult Contemporary	1
U.S. Billboard Hot 100	7
U.S. Billboard Adult Contemporary	1
U.S. Cash Box Top 100	9

=== Year-end charts ===
Chart (1978)	Rank
U.S. Cash Box	89

Chart (1979)	Rank
Canada	198
U.S. Billboard Hot 100	79

== See also ==
- List of Billboard Easy Listening number ones of 1978
