= Phil Kenzie =

English musician

- Born: Liverpool, England, United Kingdom
- Genre: Rock music
- Occupation: Musician
- Instruments: Saxophone
- Formerly of: Derry and The Seniors

Phillip John Kenzie is an English multi-saxophone player and rock and roll musician. He and Tony Kenner have been voted by fans as "two of the greatest rock 'n' roll sax players of all time."

== Biography ==
Kenzie was born in Liverpool, his first band was Derry Wilkie and The Pressmen. The band sometimes shared billing with The Beatles.

Kenzie has either toured or recorded with The Beatles, Eagles, Graham Nash, Carly Simon, David Crosby, Black Sabbath, Jackson Browne, Stevie Nicks, Alan Parsons, Al Stewart, David Essex, Leo Sayer, Wishbone Ash, Manfred Mann Chapter Three, Annie Lennox, The Pointer Sisters, The Coasters, The Temptations, Rod Stewart, David Bowie, Eric Carmen, America, Vince Gill, and Debbie Gibson, among others.

The Beatles used Kenzie on their album Let It Be, and he also played the blistering sax solo for Eagles' track "The Long Run" from the Eagles Live album.

Kenzie's sax is featured on the Al Stewart hit record "Year of the Cat", creating the dénouement for the instrumental break, as well as on Stewart's "Time Passages" and "Song on the Radio".

As a session player, Kenzie worked on Roger Daltrey's albums Ride a Rock Horse and One of the Boys, and Paul McCartney's Band on the Run. He also worked on both the live show and the movie version of The Rocky Horror Picture Show. He also played on the sessions for Poco's album Legend, in particular on their song "Heart of the Night". The arrangement to work with Poco was thanks to the band having hired Steve Chapman and Charlie Harrison (two previous Al Stewart musicians). Chapman later left Poco and became Stewart's manager.

In all, Kenzie has played on nineteen albums that have been certified gold or platinum.

In January 2015, Kenzie released a new CD and kicked off his S.O.S.S. (Save Our Sax Solo) tour on the 15th at Jazziz Nightlife in Boca Raton, Florida.
