= Uncorked (album) =

Live album by Al Stewart
- Released: 29 September 2009
- Recorded: 2009
- Genre: Acoustic
- Length: 62:13
- Label: Wallaby Trails
- Producer: Dave Nachmanoff

Al Stewart chronology
Sparks of Ancient Light (2008)	Uncorked (2009)

Professional ratings
Review scores
Source	Rating
Allmusic	4/5 stars

Uncorked is the third live album by singer-songwriter Al Stewart, and features guitarist and harmony vocalist Dave Nachmanoff. It was released on 29 September 2009 and was produced by Dave Nachmanoff and released independently on Stewart's label, Wallaby Trails Recordings.

== Track listing ==
1. "Last Days of the Century / Constantinople / Last Days" – 7:23
2. "Coldest Winter" – 5:56
3. "Warren Harding" – 3:10
4. "News From Spain" – 5:59
5. "Bedsitter Images" – 4:14
6. "Midas Shadow" – 3:53
7. "Running Man" – 4:37
8. "Palace of Versailles" – 4:29
9. "Auctioning Dave (Story)" – 1:11
10. "Princess Olivia" – 2:58
11. "Life In Dark Water" – 5:03
12. "Carol" – 4:59
13. "Old Admirals" / [hidden story] – 8:21

== Personnel ==
- Al Stewart – rhythm guitar, vocals
- Dave Nachmanoff – lead guitar, backing vocals
- Michael Nachmanoff – bass guitar on "Carol"
