= Privateer (album) =

Studio album by Tim Renwick
- Released: March 2007
- Recorded: Early 2006
- Genre: Jazz fusion; rock
- Length: 75:32
- Label: Audio Network
- Producer: Tim Renwick

Tim Renwick chronology
Tim Renwick (1980)	Privateer (2007)

Privateer is the second album by British guitarist Tim Renwick, only available on Audio License, released in 2007 as the follow-up to his 1980s Tim Renwick album.

A collection of instrumental folk/jazz/rock pieces, it features all instruments played by Renwick himself, with various guest musicians.The songs were written over the span of multiple years.

Speaking on the albums contents, Renwick said: "With these tunes I was given a free rein to do what I wanted and it occurred to me that they sounded like a band. I asked permission to repackage some of them into album form. The tracks have been, where necessary, edited, overdubbed and compiled to make them more easily listenable and then remastered. So this CD was actually an accident, but I hope, a happy one!"

== Track listing ==
All tracks by Tim Renwick.

1. "Nighthawk" -3:18
2. "Cornish Patsy" -3:22
3. "Gridlock" -3:13
4. "Polly's Song" 3:34
5. "Bertholletia Excelsa" -3:12
6. "Texas Nexus" -3:34
7. "Rolling" -2:47
8. "Slideaway" -3:39
9. "Open Road" -3:55
10. "Blue Monday" -3:45
11. "Strumtastic" -2:52
12. "Rockabilly Jo" -3:30
13. "Bertholletia Excelsa (Acoustic Reprise)" -2:20

=== Non-album tracks ===
- "Gladsome Girl" -2:58
- "Miami Beach" -3:00
- "Right As Rain" (Tim Renwick, Elfed Hayes) -3:38
- "Righteous Road" (Tim Renwick, Elfed Hayes) -3:51
- "Gridlock" -3:13
- "Freehand" -3:51
- "Boogie Shuffle" -3:33
- "Getting Jiggie" -3:29
- "Dirty Man Blues" -2:20
- "Way To Go" -3:44
- "The Shore" -2:16
- "Masquerade" -2:16
- "Gladsome Christmas" -2:58
- "Consort" -2:18

== Personnel ==
- Tim Renwick - all instruments
- Guy Pratt - bass guitar (Tracks 1, 4, 5, 9, 13)
- Paul Harris - keyboards (Tracks 1, 3, 4, 5, 9, 10, 13)
- Henry Spinetti - drums, percussion
- Steve Jackson - drums, percussion (Tracks 2, 11)
- Frank Ricotti - percussion (Tracks 1, 4, 5, 8, 13)
- Willie Wilson - tambourine (Tracks 3, 10)
- Alan Glen - harmonica (Tracks 10, 12)
- Steve Turner - National steel guitar (on "Slideaway")
- Martin Bell - fiddle (on "Slideaway")
