= Roy Guest =

British folk singer and impresario (1934–96)

- Born: Roy Norman Guest; 13 March 1934; İzmir, Turkey
- Died: 23 September 1996 (aged 62); Faversham, Kent, England
- Occupations: Musician, promoter

Roy Norman Guest (13 March 1934 – 23 September 1996) was a British folk singer and music promoter.

== Life and career ==
Born in İzmir, Turkey, to a British father and Ukrainian Greek mother, he grew up in Ebbw Vale, Monmouthshire. He trained as an actor, and began singing and playing guitar when a teacher at Summerhill School. After moving to Edinburgh to study anthropology and psychology, he met Jim Haynes of the Traverse Theatre, and the pair collaborated on producing a series of "Howffs" or folk nights. Notably, Bert Jansch started his career at the club which became a meeting place for folk musicians including Archie Fisher and Owen Hand, and the folk duo of Robin Hall and Jimmie Macgregor.

He came to wider prominence in the 1960s as a promoter with Harold Davison, and with Brian Epstein's NEMS enterprises. He oversaw the London concert debuts of Simon and Garfunkel, the Incredible String Band and Fairport Convention. Other concerts he promoted included those by Benny Goodman, Joan Baez, The Who, and Led Zeppelin. He was also an agent during the early careers of Al Stewart and Sandy Denny.

He later set up an agency and information service for the English Folk Dance and Song Society; established his own agency, Folk Directions; and organised folk festivals in the 1980s at the Fairfield Halls in Croydon. After moving to Faversham, Kent, he stood as an independent candidate in local elections, and chaired a local theatre group.

He died in Faversham in September, 1996, at the age of 62.
