= Al Stewart =

Scottish musician (born 1945)

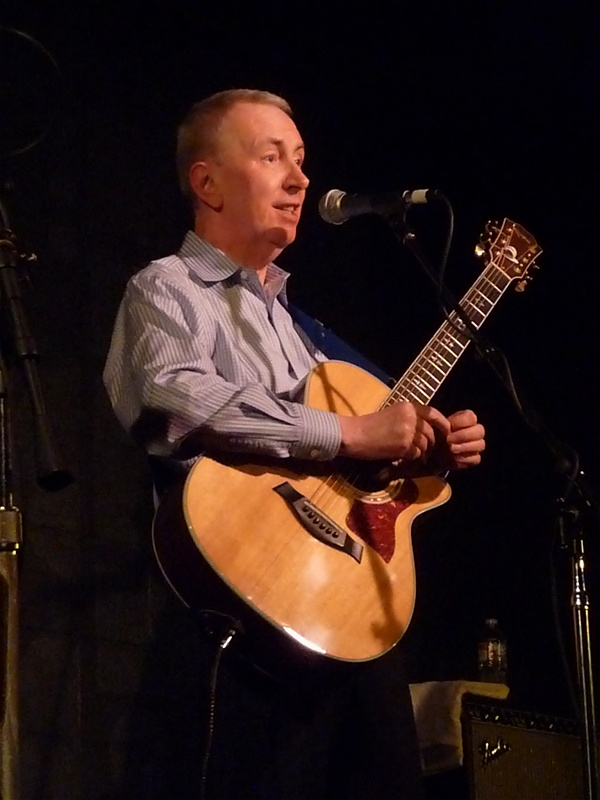
- Stewart performing in 2010

Background information
- Born: Alastair Ian Stewart; 5 September 1945 (age 81); Greenock, Renfrewshire, Scotland
- Origin: Wimborne, Dorset, England
- Genres: Rock; pop; folk rock; soft rock
- Occupations: Musician; singer; songwriter
- Instruments: Guitar; piano; vocals
- Years active: 1966–present
- Labels: CBS; RCA; EMI
- Website: alstewart.com

Alastair Ian Stewart (born 5 September 1945) is a British singer-songwriter and folk-rock musician who rose to prominence as part of the British folk revival in the 1960s and 1970s. He developed a style of combining folk-rock songs with tales of characters and events from history.

Stewart has released 16 studio and four live albums since his debut album Bed-Sitter Images in 1967, and continues to tour extensively in the US, Canada, Europe, and the UK. He is best known for his 1976 hit single "Year of the Cat", from the platinum album of the same name. Though Year of the Cat and its 1978 platinum follow-up Time Passages brought Stewart his biggest worldwide commercial successes, earlier albums such as Past, Present and Future from 1973 are often seen as better examples of his intimate brand of historical folk-rock, a style to which he returned in later albums. His 2009 release, Uncorked, was released on his independent label, Wallaby Trails Recordings, and was followed up by Al Stewart and The Empty Pockets Live in 2024. Stewart has worked with Peter White, Alan Parsons, Jimmy Page, Richard Thompson, Rick Wakeman, Francis Monkman, Tori Amos, and Tim Renwick, and more recently has played with Dave Nachmanoff and former Wings lead-guitarist Laurence Juber.

Stewart appears throughout the musical history of the folk revivalist era. He played at the initial Glastonbury Festival in 1970, knew Yoko Ono before she met John Lennon, shared a London flat with Paul Simon (who was collaborating with Bruce Woodley of the Seekers), and hosted at the Les Cousins folk club in London in the 1960s.

== Early life ==
Although born in Greenock, Scotland, Stewart grew up in the town of Wimborne, Dorset, England, after moving there with his mother, Joan Underwood. His father, Alastair MacKichan Stewart, who served as a flight lieutenant in the Royal Air Force Volunteer Reserve, had died in a plane crash during a March 11, 1945, training mission, six months before Al was born. Stewart attended Wycliffe College, Gloucestershire, as a boarder.

Of his musical beginnings, Stewart has said, "I grew up down the street from Robert Fripp. We used to take the bus together when he was 15 and I actually took 10 guitar lessons from him. He taught me all these jazz chords that I never used again in my life." Stewart learned songs by The Shadows, joined an instrumental group, and played village dances. When The Beatles broke in 1963, the band began incorporating vocals. As Stewart has said, "Around 1963-65 I was playing in local beat groups in Bournemouth." In August 1963, the Beatles performed in Bournemouth. Stewart and a friend concocted a scheme to get backstage and meet the group by posing as representatives for Rickenbacker guitars. The ruse worked and they were ushered to the dressing room, where they found the Beatles between performances. John Lennon chatted with Stewart and his friend and let Stewart play his black Rickenbacker 325 guitar.

Stewart soon discovered the music of Bob Dylan. According to Stewart's later song, "Post World War II Blues" (from Past, Present and Future): "I came up to London when I was 19 with a corduroy jacket and a head full of dreams." Having bought his fourth guitar from future Police guitarist Andy Summers, Stewart traded in his electric guitar for an acoustic guitar when he was offered a weekly slot at Bunjies Coffee House in London's Soho in 1965. From there, he went on to serve as master of ceremonies at the Les Cousins folk club on Greek Street, where he played alongside Cat Stevens, Bert Jansch, Van Morrison, Roy Harper, Ralph McTell, and Paul Simon with whom he shared a flat in Dellow Street, Stepney, London.

== Career ==
Stewart's first recording was on Jackson C. Frank's debut album, 1965's Jackson C. Frank, playing guitar on "Yellow Walls". His first record was the single "The Elf" (backed with a version of the Yardbirds' "Turn into Earth"), which was released in 1966 on Decca Records and included guitar work from Jimmy Page (later of the Yardbirds and Led Zeppelin). Stewart and Page became friendly, with Stewart teaching Page open-D tuning and Page teaching Stewart octaves and harmonics. Stewart had learned the Irish ballad “Blackwaterside” from watching Bert Jansch; he showed Page how to play Jansch's arrangement of the song, which would eventually appear on the first Led Zeppelin album as “Black Mountain Side” (without crediting Jansch).

Stewart signed to Columbia Records (CBS in the UK), for whom he released six albums. Though the first four of these attracted relatively little commercial interest, Stewart's popularity and cult following grew steadily through albums that contain some of Stewart's most incisive and introspective songwriting.

=== Early albums (1967–1973) ===
Stewart's debut album, Bedsitter Images, was released in 1967. A revised version appeared in 1970 as The First Album (Bedsitter Images) with a few tracks changed, and the album was reissued on CD in 2007 with all tracks from both versions.

Love Chronicles (1969) was notable for the 18-minute title track, an anguished autobiographical tale of sexual encounters that was the first mainstream record release ever to include the word "fucking". It was voted "Folk Album of the Year" by the UK music magazine Melody Maker and features Jimmy Page and Richard Thompson on guitar.

His third album, Zero She Flies, followed in 1970 and included a number of shorter songs which ranged from acoustic ballads and instrumentals to songs that featured electric lead guitar. These first three albums (including The Elf) were later released as the two-CD set To Whom it May Concern: 1966–70.

In 1970, Stewart and fellow musician Ian A. Anderson headed to the small town of Pilton, Somerset. There, at Michael Eavis's Worthy Farm, Stewart performed at the first-ever Glastonbury Festival to a field of 1,000 hippies, who had paid just £1 each to be there.

On the back of his growing success, Stewart released Orange in 1972. It was written after a tumultuous breakup with his girlfriend and muse, Mandi, and was very much a transitional album, combining songs in Stewart's confessional style with more intimations of the historical themes that he would increasingly adopt (e.g., "The News from Spain" with its progressive rock overtones, including dramatic piano by Rick Wakeman).

The fifth release, Past, Present and Future (1973), was Stewart's first album to receive a proper release in the United States, via Janus Records. It echoed a traditional historical storytelling style and contained the song "Nostradamus," a long (9:43) track in which Stewart tied into the rediscovery of the claimed seer's writings by referring to selected possible predictions about 20th century people and events. While it ran too long for mainstream radio airplay at that time, the song became a hit on many US FM and college radio stations, which were flexible about runtime.

Airplay helped the album to reach No. 133 on the Billboard album chart in the US. Other songs on Past, Present and Future characterized by Stewart's "history genre" mentioned American President Warren G. Harding, Ernst Röhm, Christine Keeler, Louis Mountbatten, and Operation Barbarossa.

=== Alan Parsons years (1975–1978) ===
Stewart followed Past, Present and Future with Modern Times (1975), in which the songs were lighter on historical references and more of a return to the theme of short stories set to music. Significantly, though, it was the first of his albums to be produced by Alan Parsons.

In a highly positive retrospective review of Modern Times, AllMusic senior editor Stephen Thomas Erlewine described the album as "exquisite". Erlewine wrote that the album "establishes Stewart's classic sound of folky narratives and Lennonesque melodies, all wrapped up in a lush, layered production from Alan Parsons. The production gives epics like the title track a real sense of grandeur that makes their sentiments resonate strongly."

Modern Times produced Stewart's first hit single, "Carol". The album reached No. 30 in the US and received substantial airplay on album-oriented stations some 30 years before Bob Dylan would release an album of the same name.

Stewart's contract with CBS Records expired at this point, and he signed to RCA Records for the world outside North America. His first two albums for RCA, Year of the Cat (released on Janus Records in the US, then reissued by Arista Records after Janus folded) and Time Passages (released in the U.S. on Arista), set the style for his later work and have been his biggest-selling recordings.

Stewart told Kaya Burgess of The Times: "When I finished Year of the Cat, I thought: 'If this isn't a hit, then I can't make a hit.' We finally got the formula exactly right."

Stewart had all of the music and orchestration written and completely recorded before he had a title for any of the songs. He mentioned in a Canadian radio interview that he has done this for six of his albums, and he often writes four different sets of lyrics for each song.

Both albums reached the top ten in the US, with Year of the Cat peaking at No. 5 and Time Passages at No. 10, and both albums produced hit singles in the US ("Year of the Cat" No. 8, and "On the Border", #42; "Time Passages" No. 7 and "Song on the Radio", #29). In Canada, Year of the Cat reached No. 13 and Time Passages No. 8, and both albums produced hit singles there too with "Year of the Cat" No. 3, and "On the Border", #47; "Time Passages" No. 10 and "Song on the Radio", #29. Meanwhile, "Year of the Cat" became Stewart's first chart single in Britain, where it peaked at No. 31. It was a huge success at London's Capital Radio, reaching number 2 on their Capital Countdown chart. The overwhelming success of these songs on the two albums, both of which still receive substantial radio airplay on classic-rock/pop format radio stations, has perhaps later overshadowed the depth and range of Stewart's body of songwriting.

=== 1980s ===
Stewart then released 24 Carrots (#37 US 1980) and his first live album Live/Indian Summer (#110 US 1981), with both featuring backing by Peter White's band Shot in the Dark (who released their own album in 1981). While "24 Carrots" did produce a No. 24 single with "Midnight Rocks", the album sold less well than its two immediate predecessors.

After those releases, Stewart was dropped by Arista and his popularity declined. Despite his lower profile and waning commercial success, he continued to tour the world, record albums, and maintain a loyal fanbase. There was a four-year gap between his next two albums, the political Russians and Americans (1984) and the upbeat pop-oriented Last Days of the Century (1988), which appeared on smaller labels and had lower sales than his previous works.

=== 1990s ===
Stewart followed up with his second live album, the acoustic Rhymes in Rooms (1992), which featured only Stewart and Peter White, and Famous Last Words (1993), which was dedicated to the memory of the late Peter Wood (co-writer of "Year of the Cat"), who died the year of its release.

After parting ways with his longtime collaborator of almost 20 years, Peter White (who was credited on every studio and live album between Year of the Cat and Famous Last Words and also served as his regular songwriting partner), Stewart joined with former Wings guitarist Laurence Juber to record a concept album, Between the Wars (1995), covering major historical and cultural events from 1918 to 1939, such as the Treaty of Versailles, Prohibition, the Spanish Civil War, and the Great Depression. Juber produced the album, and went on to produce Stewart's subsequent studio albums.

In 1995, Stewart was invited to play at the 25th anniversary Glastonbury Festival.

=== 21st century ===
In 2000, Stewart released Down in the Cellar, a concept album themed on wine. Stewart had begun a love affair with wine in the 1970s when, he admitted, he had more money than he knew how to spend, and so turned to fine wines.

In 2005, he released A Beach Full of Shells, which was set in places varying from First World War England to the 1950s rock 'n' roll scene that influenced him.

In 2008, he released Sparks of Ancient Light, produced, like his most recent albums, by Laurence Juber. On this album he weaves tales of William McKinley, Lord Salisbury, and Hanno the Navigator. A video for the song "Elvis at the Wheel" was released in December 2013.

Stewart and guitarist Dave Nachmanoff released a live album, Uncorked, on Stewart's label, Wallaby Trails Recordings, in 2009. They played the Glastonbury Festival 40th anniversary in June 2010 on the acoustic stage.

Stewart sang a duet with Albert Hammond of Hammond's "It Never Rains in Southern California" on Hammond's 2010 album Legend.

In 2011, Stewart sang a duet with his guitarist and opening act Dave Nachmanoff on Nachmanoff's album Step Up. The song, "Sheila Won't Be Coming Home", was co-written by Stewart and Nachmanoff.

In April 2015, Stewart released a cover of the Beatles song "I Feel Fine" on the compilation album Keep Calm and Salute The Beatles.

In May 2015, Stewart performed the albums Past, Present and Future and Year of the Cat in their entirety at the Royal Albert Hall with a band that included Tim Renwick, Peter White and Stuart Elliott, who had appeared on the original recordings.

In April 2017, Stewart was given a Lifetime Achievement award at the BBC Radio 2 Folk Awards, presented by Tony Blackburn, with whom he had once played in a band in Dorset.

In October 2022 he toured in the UK supported by the Empty Pockets (who opened with their own set before backing Stewart).

In 2024, Stewart released a live album with the Empty Pockets, Al Stewart & the Empty Pockets Live, which features a guest appearance by Peter White on "Time Passages".

Also in 2024, Stewart announced a Farewell Tour in the UK with the Empty Pockets in 2025 to coincide with his 80th birthday.

== Personal life ==
Born in Scotland, raised in Dorset, and gaining fame in London, Stewart moved to Los Angeles shortly after the release of Year of the Cat. He was married to Kristine, with whom he had two daughters, from 1993 to 2005. The family lived in Marin County, outside of San Francisco. He subsequently married Jill on 12 September 2020. The couple now lives in Arizona.

Stewart is a noted wine aficionado. After "Year of the Cat" became a hit, he bought a house in Los Angeles and installed a wine cellar, filling it with 3,000 bottles. "I had all the first growths," Stewart said, "all the great vintages—1945, 1949, 1953, 1959, 1961. I would go in there after a show and open a bottle of something nice. I loved my wine cellar, it was just the most beautiful thing in the world." Stewart has estimated that he probably spent 50 percent of his disposable income on wine. "I’m ashamed to say I think I’ve probably wasted all the rest,” he told Decanter magazine in 2004.

== Use of historical and literary sources ==
=== Historical references ===
Stewart's historical work includes such subjects as:

- World War I pilots – "Fields of France", from the album Last Days of the Century
- The career of Admiral Sir John Fisher of the World War I Royal Navy inspired "Old Admirals", from Past, Present, and Future
- The Wehrmacht's invasion of the Soviet Union in World War II is the focus of "Roads to Moscow", from Past, Present, and Future. There are references to both Wehrmacht General Heinz Guderian and also to the German Tiger tank and to the brutal treatment of returning Russian soldiers, which is drawn from the Aleksandr Solzhenitsyn book The Gulag Archipelago.
- Both the Basque separatists in Spain and the crisis in the republic of Rhodesia are referenced in "On the Border", from Year of the Cat
- There's an allusion to Harold Macmillan winds of change speech (1960) in "On the Border", from Year of the Cat
- The Soviet Union is the focus of "In Red Square", from Seemed Like a Good Idea at the Time, and in "Joe the Georgian" from Between the Wars.
- The Battle of Flores (1591) and the efforts of English admiral Sir Richard Grenville are chronicled in "Lord Grenville," from Year of the Cat.
- The French Revolution is addressed in the song "The Palace of Versailles", from Time Passages.
- Amy Johnson inspired the song "Flying Sorcery", from Year of the Cat.
- Henry VIII of England (misidentified by Stewart as Henry Plantagenet (Henry II)) and Thomas More (Henry VIII's chancellor) are referenced in "A Man for All Seasons" from Time Passages.
- The assassin of Jean-Paul Marat is the subject of "Charlotte Corday", from Famous Last Words.
- The subject of Nazi war criminals hiding in South America is featured in "Running Man" from 24 Carrots.
- The scandals of the foreshortened Warren Harding administration are the subject of "Warren Harding" from Past, Present and Future.
- Benjamin Franklin is the subject of the song "Franklin's Table" from his album Down in the Cellar.
- William McKinley is the subject of the song "Like William McKinley" from his album Sparks of Ancient Light.
- Other US presidents mentioned in Al Stewart's songs are Dwight Eisenhower in (A Child's View) of the Eisenhower Years, Calvin Coolidge in Lindy Comes to Town, which is about Charles Lindbergh's transatlantic flight, and Woodrow Wilson in A League of Notions, about the formation of the League of Nations and the aftermath of World War I.
- Ernst Röhm, leader of the Nazi SA, is the subject of "The Last Day of June 1934" from Past, Present and Future.
- Michel de Nostredame, the 16th century alchemist/polyglot, is referenced in the song "Nostradamus" from Past, Present and Future, as is Francisco Franco, as well as Adolf Hitler and Napoleon I, "Hister" and "Napoloron" respectively.
- The escape of Mohammad Reza Pahlavi, the last Shah of Iran, during the Iranian Revolution is the subject of "Shah of Shahs", from Sparks of Ancient Light
- Hanno the Navigator is the subject of the song "Hanno the Navigator" from his album Sparks of Ancient Light.
- The song title Katherine of Oregon from the album A Beach Full of Shells is a pun on Catherine of Aragon.

=== Literary sources ===
"Sirens of Titan", from Modern Times is a musical precis of Kurt Vonnegut's novel of the same name.

On occasion, Stewart has set poems to music, such as "My Enemies Have Sweet Voices" (lyrics by the poet Pete Morgan) on the 1970 album Zero She Flies. During his 1999 UK tour, Stewart invited Morgan to read the lyrics as he performed this song in the Leeds City Varieties Theatre show of 7 November 1999. Stewart also invited Morgan to read the poem at the Beverly gig on the same tour, whilst Stewart took a short break, and Morgan subsequently read another poem from his works as well.

== Songwriting ==
In a 23 June 2012 telephone interview with Bob Reid and Blair Packham on NewsTalk 1010 AM in Toronto, Ontario (partially transcribed below), Al Stewart provided these insights into his songwriting "process":

I don't like repetition. For example, there have been nine songs in the Top Ten, I think, called "Hold On" (Including, I think, once there were two called "Hold On" simultaneously in the Top Ten). OK, if you're really cynical, and you've written a new song, you'll probably want to call it "Hold On" because it gives you an extra edge. But at the same time it shows so little interest in originality that I can't actually listen to anything called "Hold On" at this point in my life. I mean, it just seems crazy. So, if I have two little rules and guiding principles, they would be:

(a) Don't use words that other people use. Very few people would put the word, oh, I don't know, "pterodactyl" into a song. So that's fine. No "Oh"'s. No "Baby"'s. No "I miss you so"'s. And no "you done me wrong". No "bad"'s or "sad"'s.

(b) And the other thing is, write about subjects that no one else writes about. Basically 90% of all songs seem to be either "Baby, I love you so", or "Baby, you've done me wrong". Now, when people look at songs, when I play anybody on the planet this song, and I say "What is this?", they will say, "Oh, that's Reggae", or "Oh, that's Heavy Metal", or "That's Country & Western", or "Oh, that's Opera", you know what I mean? But that's not what I asked. They're answering a question I didn't ask. What they're saying is "That's the music". What I'm saying is "What is the song?" And the song is either "I've done you wrong", or, "Baby, I love you so", no matter what style it's played in. In other words, there's a huge difference between content and style, and, if you work more towards content, why not make it content that is original.

…

If it's already been written, why write it again? If it's already been said, why say it again? I mean there are some remarkable quotes that I love. But I didn't say them. And you don't want to pass them off as your own work. Napoleon said that "Time spent in reconnaissance is never wasted". And that, actually, has governed my life. You know what I mean? That's a quote you can live by. But it's not my quote. So if I say it I always credit it to Napoleon. There is another way of saying any of the things you want to say, rather than rehashing someone else's words.

…

I think of songs as cinema, really. It's aural cinema. I want to show you a movie when I'm playing a song. That's essentially what I'm doing. And, of course, the songs are geographical too. One of the ways I get inspired to write a song – and this will always produce a song that sounds like nothing else (I can't recommend this highly enough) – I just open a world atlas, just at random, and whatever page I'm looking at, at least six songs immediately occur to me.

…

So, if you look at pretty much any of the songs, a lot of them are geographical, historical, and form a movie.

== Discography ==
=== Studio albums ===
Year	Album	Peak chart positions			Certifications
Year	Album	US	AUS	UK	Certifications
1967	Bedsitter Images: Label: CBS; Initial Release: October 1967	–	–	–	
1969	Love Chronicles: Label: CBS, Epic (US); Initial Release: September 1969	–	–	–	
1970	Zero She Flies: Label: CBS; Initial Release: April 1970	–	–	40	
1972	Orange: Label: CBS; Initial Release: January 1972	–	–	–	
1973	Past, Present and Future: Label: CBS, Janus (US); Initial Release: October 1973	133	–	–	
1975	Modern Times: Label: CBS, Janus (US); Initial Release: January 1975	30	–	–	
1976	Year of the Cat: Label: RCA, Janus (US); Initial Release: October 1976	5	10	38	US: Platinum; UK: Gold
1978	Time Passages: Label: RCA, Arista (US); Initial Release: September 1978	10	15	39	US: Platinum; UK: Silver
1980	24 Carrots (with Shot in the Dark): Label: RCA, Arista (US); Initial Release: August 1980	37	51	55	
1984	Russians & Americans: Label: RCA, Passport (US); Initial Release: May 1984	–	–	83	
1988	Last Days of the Century: Label: Enigma; Initial Release: August 1988	–	–	–	
1993	Famous Last Words: Label: EMI, Mesa (US); Initial Release: September 1993	–	–	–	
1995	Between the Wars (with Laurence Juber): Label: EMI, Mesa (US); Initial Release: May 1995	–	–	–	
2000	Down in the Cellar: Label: EMI, Miramar (US); Initial Release: October 2000	–	–	–	
2005	A Beach Full of Shells: Label: EMI, Appleseed (US); Initial Release: June 2005	–	–	–	
2008	Sparks of Ancient Light: Label: EMI, Appleseed (US); Initial Release: September 2008	–	–	–	

=== Live albums ===
Year	Album	Peak chart positions	
Year	Album	US	AUS
1981	Live/Indian Summer: Label: RCA, Arista (US); Initial release: October 1981	110	50
1992	Rhymes in Rooms (with Peter White): Label: EMI, Mesa (US); Initial release: March 1992	–	–
2009	Uncorked (with Dave Nachmanoff): Label: Wallaby Trails; Initial release: September 2009	–	–
2024	Al Stewart & the Empty Pockets Live: Label: Wallaby Trails; Initial release: August 2024	–	–

=== Singles ===
Year	Song	Peak chart positions								Album	B/W
Year	Song	AUS	Canada RPM 100	Canada AC	NZ	SA	US Hot 100	US AC	UK	Album	B/W
1966	"The Elf"	–	–	–	–	–	–	–	–	non-album single	"Turn into Earth"
1967	"Bedsitter Images"	–	–	–	–	–	–	–	–	Bedsitter Images	"Swiss Cottage Manoeuvres"
1970	"Electric Los Angeles Sunset"	–	–	–	–	–	–	–	–	Zero She Flies	"My Enemies Have Sweet Voices"
1971	"The News From Spain"	–	–	–	–	–	–	–	–	Orange	"Elvaston Place"
1972	"Amsterdam"	–	–	–	–	–	–	–	–	Orange	"Songs Out of Clay"
1972	"You Don't Even Know Me"	–	–	–	–	–	–	–	–	Orange	"I'm Falling"
1973	"Terminal Eyes" (UK Release)	–	–	–	–	–	–	–	–	Past, Present and Future	"The Last Day of June 1934"
1974	"Nostradamus" (US Release)	–	–	–	–	–	–	–	–	Past, Present and Future	"Terminal Eyes"
1975	"Carol" (UK Release)	–	–	–	–	–	–	–	–	Modern Times	"Next Time"
1975	"Carol" (US Release)	–	–	–	–	–	–	–	–	Modern Times	"Sirens of Titan"
1976	"Year of the Cat"	13	3	8	15	–	8	8	31	Year of the Cat	"Broadway Hotel"
1977	"Sand in Your Shoes"	–	–	–	–	6	–	–	–	Year of the Cat	"Lord Grenville"
1977	"On the Border"	–	47	8	–	–	42	23	–	Year of the Cat	"Flying Sorcery"
1978	"Time Passages"	36	10	1	–	–	7	1	–	Time Passages	"Almost Lucy"
1979	"Song on the Radio"	–	29	3	–	–	29	10	–	Time Passages	"A Man For All Seasons"
1980	"Midnight Rocks"	85	79	46	–	–	24	13	–	24 Carrots	"Constantinople"
1980	"Mondo Sinistro"	–	–	–	–	–	–	–	–	24 Carrots	"Merlin's Time"
1980	"Paint By Numbers"	–	–	–	–	–	–	–	–	24 Carrots	"Optical Illusion"
1984	"Lori, Don't Go Right Now"	–	–	–	–	–	–	–	–	Russians and Americans	"Accident on 3rd Street"
1988	"King of Portugal"	–	–	–	–	–	–	–	–	Last Days of the Century	"King of Portugal (Rock Mix)"
1993	"Don't Forget Me"	–	–	–	–	–	–	–	–	Famous Last Words	"Trains/Charlotte Corday"
2005	"Class of '58" extended track not released in full on the album	–	–	–	–	–	–	–	–	A Beach Full of Shells	–

=== Compilation albums ===
- The Early Years (1977)
- The Best of Al Stewart – Songs From the Radio (1985)
- Chronicles... The Best of Al Stewart (1991)
- To Whom it May Concern 1966–1970 (1993)
- Premium Gold Collection (1996)
- Seemed Like a Good Idea at the Time (1996) (limited distribution of B-sides and rarities)
- On the Border (1998)
- Singer Songwriter (2001)
- The Very Best Al Stewart Album Ever (2002)
- The Essential Al Stewart (2003)
- Introducing... Al Stewart – Running Man (2003)
- Greatest Hits (2004)
- Just Yesterday (2005)
- A Piece of Yesterday – The Anthology (2006)
- The Definitive Pop Collection (2006)
- An Introduction To : Al Stewart (2017)
