= Tim Renwick =

English guitarist (born 1949)

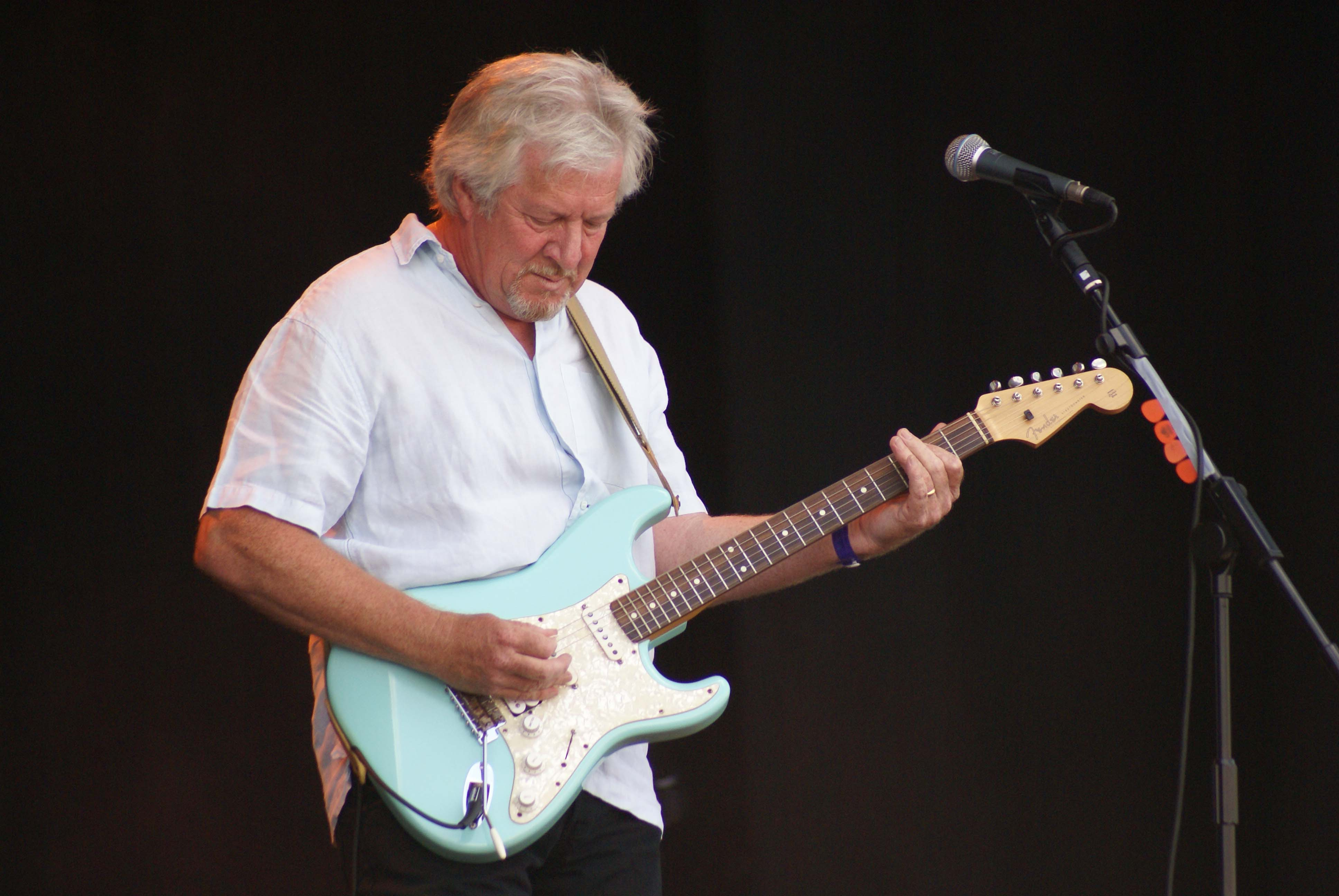
- Renwick with the Bucket Boys, performing at Fairport's Cropredy Convention Festival, 2007

Background information
- Born: Timothy John Pearson Renwick; 7 August 1949 (age 76); Cambridge, England
- Genres: Rock; pop
- Occupations: Musician; songwriter; guitarist
- Instruments: Guitar; bass guitar; vocals
- Years active: 1963–present
- Labels: Audio Network Plc
- Website: timrenwick.com

Timothy John Pearson Renwick (born 7 August 1949) is an English guitarist. He is best known for his association with Al Stewart in his early career and for his long-standing role as lead guitarist for the Sutherland Brothers & Quiver. His single "Dark Island" peaked at number 80 in Australia in 1980.

He also performed with Pink Floyd on their 1987-89 and 1994 tours, as well as accompanying the band during their Live 8 performance in 2005.

== Career ==
Renwick was born and grew up in Cambridge. He passed his 11 plus and consequently attended Cambridgeshire High School for Boys, as had future Floyd members Syd Barrett and Roger Waters. After dabbling in other instruments, he started to play guitar when he was 14, and progressed to playing in local bands in 1963. Throughout that decade he performed with Little Women, Wages of Sin, Junior's Eyes, The Hype, Quiver (later Sutherland Brothers & Quiver) and Lazy Racer. He also worked for the Alan Parsons' rhythm section at Abbey Road Studios with Pete Moss for the Sutherland Brothers and Al Stewart. He did session work for Elton John, Procol Harum, Andy Gibb, Bridget St. John, Shirley Collins and The Albion Country Band, David Bowie, Mike Oldfield, Gary Brooker, Roger Waters, Eric Clapton, David Byron, Rick Wright, Jonathan Kelly (credited also with flute), Sally Oldfield, Maggie Reilly, China Crisis, Nick Heyward, Pink Floyd and Brian Joseph Friel.

== Pink Floyd and other projects ==
Renwick is credited as the co-composer of Elton John's song "Dreamboat". The song was released on the "Kiss the Bride" single in 1983, but was most likely recorded in the late 1970s, when Renwick was briefly a member of Elton John's band, recording with him on A Single Man and playing with him in John's 1980 concert in Central Park, New York.

In 1984, Renwick toured with Roger Waters during his The Pros and Cons of Hitchhiking tour. Among the other musicians in Waters' band was Eric Clapton, with whom Tim toured the following year, on Clapton's Behind The Sun tour. He appeared as a member of Clapton's band at the Live Aid Concert 13 July 1985 in Philadelphia, Pennsylvania. In 1987, David Gilmour invited Renwick to tour with Pink Floyd as a session musician, and recordings from the August 1988 shows were released in the double live album Delicate Sound of Thunder. This makes Renwick, along with Michael Kamen, Patrick Leonard and Jon Carin, one of the few musicians who performed with both Waters and his former bandmates after Waters had left Pink Floyd.

Renwick joined the Tex Maniax with Andy Roberts and other ex Wangfords (1984) and Mike + The Mechanics (1989). Renwick joined Pink Floyd again later on their 1989 European tour, on the 1994 studio album, The Division Bell, and on The Division Bell Tour, which again resulted in a double live album, Pulse.

Renwick made a live appearance with the Alan Parsons Band in the 1998 Michael Jackson Gala (replacing the original guitarist Ian Bairnson). He recorded with Pink Floyd colleague Rick Wright, playing guitar on his 1996 album Broken China. In 2005 he appeared once more with Pink Floyd as second guitarist (and bassist on "Wish You Were Here") for their Live 8 reunion.

He also played with Al Stewart at Cambridge Corn Exchange on 7 October 2013, and again on Stewart's 2015 UK and Ireland tour.

== Solo work ==
Renwick has recorded an eponymous album, Tim Renwick, released in 1980, and in 2007 compiled an instrumental album titled Privateer, published by Audio Network Plc. and available from his website. Privateer II was released in 2017 following a similar theme.

He now lives in Pentewan, Cornwall, and plays guitar in The Bucket Boys. He also played in a duo called Hobson's Choice, and is an occasional guest player with Cornish band The Hoodle.

== Solo discography ==
- Tim Renwick (1980)
- Privateer (2007)
- Electric Blue (2008)
- Vintage Blues Guitar (2013)
- Privateer 2 (2017)
