= Lights from the Valley =

Studio album by Chilliwack
- Released: June 1978
- Studios: Mushroom Studios, Vancouver
- Genre: Rock
- Length: 36:02
- Label: Mushroom
- Producers: Bill Henderson, Ross Turney, Marc Gilutin

Chilliwack chronology
Dreams, Dreams, Dreams (1977)	Lights from the Valley (1978)	Breakdown in Paradise (1979)

Lights from the Valley is the seventh album by the Canadian rock band Chilliwack, released in June 1978; the album marked the recording debut of Brian MacLeod with the band, while serving as the swan song for founding Chilliwack members Glenn Miller and Ross Turney. In November 1978, Lights from the Valley was certified Platinum (in excess of 100,000 copies sold) in Canada.

== Recording ==
At the time of the release of Lights from the Valley, Chilliwack had been recording tracks intended for the band's seventh album release over the period of a year. After rejecting two distinct sets of tracks which the band had submitted for album release, Mushroom Records had had Chilliwack - til then self-produced - collaborate with producer Marc Gilutin who co-produced a third distinct set of tracks to be issued as Chilliwack's seventh album, with the sessions co-produced by Gilutin introducing as members of Chilliwack guitarist Brian MacLeod who'd remain a member for four Chilliwack albums, and Jamie Bowers (guitar/ keyboards) who would not record again with the group. The tracks co-produced by Gilutin included two songs written by MacLeod and also two "outside songs" - the first (and it would prove only) non-original material ever to be recorded by Chilliwack since the band had been rebranded from "The Collectors" - : "Arms of Mary" and "In Love With a Look": "In Love With a Look" was a co-write by Ted Myers who'd fronted Glider a session group whose self-titled 1977 album release had been produced by Gilutin, while the 1975 original Sutherland Brothers version of "Arms of Mary" had enjoyed widespread international hit status while barely registering in North America.

The third intended version of Chilliwack's seventh album was issued in June 1978 under the title Lights from the Valley, a quote from "Arms of Mary" which track served as lead single: "Arms of Mary" would fail to become one of Chilliwack's most successful Canadian chart hits with a modest #49 peak, although the track would become the fourth Chilliwack single to rank on the Hot 100 in Billboard with its #67 peak outranking the band's three previous Hot 100 entries. A second single release: "Never Be the Same" was a low impact Canadian chart item with a peak of #59 and would not register on the Billboard Hot 100: in fact "Arms of Mary" would remain Chilliwack's last Hot 100 entry until 26 September 1981 when "My Girl (Gone, Gone, Gone)" debuted at #81: by its third week on the chart - that of 10 October 1981 - "My Girl..." had bested "Arms of Mary" as Chilliwack's highest ranking Hot 100 entry, "My Girl..."'s 10 October 1981 Hot 100 ranking being #60 (the eventual Hot 100 peak of "My Girl..." would be #22).

== Impact ==
Intended to build on the qualified success of the precedent Dreams, Dreams, Dreams album, Lights from the Valley would not in fact rise above its predecessor's success level, with Mushroom's financial problems incurred via litigation with the rock band Heart hampering the promotion of Lights from the Valley. In fact the turmoil inherent in the album's convoluted recording history threatened to shut down the band: veteran guitarist Howard Froese was replaced by Brian MacLeod after the first attempt at Chilliwack's seventh album was rejected, although Froese would receive "special thanks" on the released Lights from the Valley album, citing background vocals and acoustic guitar. By the time of the release of Lights from the Valley Glenn Miller (bass) and Ross Turney (drums), who had worked alongside Chilliwack's lead vocalist/ guitarist Bill Henderson since the Chilliwack forerunner the Collectors, had left the group. This necessitated the recruitment of new members Skip Layton (drums) and Ab Bryant (bass) to perform with Henderson, Bowers and MacLeod in Chilliwack's live gigs, and only Henderson, MacLeod and Bryant would remain with Chilliwack for the group's eighth album: the 1979 release Breakdown in Paradise.

In 2013, all of the Chilliwack albums on Mushroom were rereleased in CD format: the CD release of Lights from the Valley featured as bonus tracks "Mary Lou and Me" - the B-side to the 1977 single "Fly at Night" - and also the songwriting demo of "The Hardest Things to See", an intended track for Chilliwack's seventh album.

== Critical reception ==
The Globe and Mail wrote: "Chilliwack is no longer an obscure, occasionally exciting Canadian rock band. It is now a full-blown vehicle for the latest in imitative California sounds."

== Track listing ==
1. "Never Be the Same" (Henderson) (3:30)
2. "I Wanna Be the One" (Henderson, Turney) (3:20)
3. "How Can You Hide Your Love?" (MacLeod) (3:46)
4. "(We Don't Have To) Fall in Love" (Henderson) (3:45)
5. "Lookin' for a Place" (Henderson) (4:55)
6. "Arms of Mary" (Sutherland) (3:01)
7. "Tonight" (Henderson, Turney) (3:10)
8. "She Keeps On Cryin'" (Henderson, Turney) (3:03)
9. "In Love With a Look" (Myers, Jalananda) (3:20)
10. "No Love At All" (MacLeod) (4:12)

=== 2013 Bonus Tracks ===
1. "Mary Lou and Me" (Henderson, Turney) (3:47)
2. "The Hardest Things to See" (Henderson, Turney) (songwriting demo) (2:07)

== Personnel ==
Chilliwack

- Bill Henderson - guitar, vocals
- Glenn Miller - bass, vocals
- Ross Turney - drums, percussion
- Brian MacLeod - guitars, vocals
- Jamie Bowers - guitar, keyboards

with:

- Howard Froese - acoustic guitar, backing vocals (not listed as group member/ credited as "Special thanks")
- Eddie Tuduri - drums (not listed as group member/ credited as "Special thanks")
