= Greatest Hits (Chilliwack album) =

Greatest hits album by Chilliwack
- Released: 1994
- Recorded: 1969–1983
- Genre: Rock
- Length: 46:49
- Label: CBS
- Producer: Bill Henderson, Brian MacLeod, Ross Turney, Marc Gilutin, Stephen Barncard, Mike Flicker, Terry Jacks, Chilliwack

Chilliwack chronology
Look In Look Out (1984)	Greatest Hits (1994)	There and Back - Live (2003)

Professional ratings
Review scores
Source	Rating
Allmusic	4.5/5 stars

Greatest Hits is a greatest hits album by the Canadian rock band Chilliwack originally released in 1994. The album’s thirteen tracks, arranged in a backwards-chronological sequence, include the group’s most notable releases between the years 1969 and 1984 (and is, in fact, identical to the track listing of their album Segue, although several tracks that appeared in single versions on Segue are presented in their full album versions here). Allmusic rated Greatest Hits with four-and-a-half stars, calling the album "a truly solid package" and "a sincerely delightful collection."

In 2002, Greatest Hits was digitally remastered by Peter J. Moore using Sonic Solutions NoNoise Technology. The re-released compilation includes an eleven-page booklet recounting the group’s history. Also included on the remastered CD are the original full-length videos for "Whatcha Gonna Do" and "My Girl (Gone, Gone, Gone)", which can be played on Windows Media Player.

== Track listing ==
1. "Don't Stop" (Mulford, Henderson) (4:01)
2. "Getting Better" (Henderson, Mulford) (3:43)
3. "Whatcha Gonna Do" (Henderson, MacLeod) (4:16)
4. "My Girl (Gone, Gone, Gone)" (Henderson, MacLeod) (4:15)
5. "I Believe" (Henderson) (3:58)
6. "Communication Breakdown" (Henderson) (2:24)
7. "Arms of Mary" (Sutherland) (3:04)
8. "Fly at Night" (Henderso, Turney) (4:54)
9. "Baby Blue" (Henderson, Turney) (3:21)
10. "California Girl" (Henderson) (3:01)
11. "Crazy Talk" (Henderson) (3:07)
12. "Lonesome Mary" (Henderson) (3:02)
13. "Rain-O" (Henderson) (4:27)
