= Chilliwack (disambiguation) =

Chilliwack is a city in British Columbia, Canada, it may also refer to:.

Chilliwack may also refer to:

== Music ==
- Chilliwack (band), a Canadian rock band
- Chilliwack (1970 album)
- Chilliwack (1971 album)

== Places ==
- Chilliwhack (electoral district), a provincial electoral district from 1903 to 1912
- Chilliwack Lake Provincial Park, a provincial park located around the lake
- Chilliwack Lake, a lake in British Columbia, Canada and Washington, United States
- Chilliwack Mountain, a mountain in the city of Chilliwack
- Chilliwack River, a river in British Columbia, Canada and Washington, United States
- CFB Chilliwack, a former Canadian Forces Base in Chilliwack

== Sports ==
- Chilliwack Bruins, a former junior ice hockey team
- Chilliwack Chiefs, a junior ice hockey team

== Other ==
- First Nations peoples formerly known as the Chilliwack Indians and Chilliwack Indian Band, see Sto:lo
