= Arms of Mary =

1976 single by The Sutherland Brothers and Quiver

- Side A of the original UK single

Single by Sutherland Brothers and Quiver

from the album Reach for the Sky
- B-side: "We Get Along"; "Love on the Moon" (US/NZ)
- Released: 6 February 1976
- Recorded: 1975
- Genre: Soft rock, folk rock
- Length: 2:40
- Label: CBS
- Songwriter: Iain Sutherland
- Producer: Howard and Ron Albert

Sutherland Brothers and Quiver singles chronology
"Ain't Too Proud" (1975)	"Arms of Mary" (1976)	"Secrets" (1976)

Music video
- "Arms of Mary" on TopPop on YouTube

"Arms of Mary" is a song written by Iain Sutherland and performed by Sutherland Brothers and Quiver. It was a 1976 international hit single for the band; the Glasgow Herald in its obituary for Iain Sutherland described "Arms of Mary" as "a plaintive and radio-friendly folk-rock ballad in which the narrator reminisces over the woman he first made love to."

== Original version ==
Iain Sutherland would recall writing "Arms of Mary" at the family farmhouse in the Stoke-on-Trent village of Stockton Brook, adding: "The stuff about 'the lights shine down the valley' [the opening line], I was looking down through Endon basically", citing the village of Endon situated in the Churnet Valley. "Arms of Mary" was introduced on the September 1975 album release Reach for the Sky which marked the debut of the Sutherland Brothers and Quiver on CBS Records: Iain Sutherland would comment: "The main reason we left [previous label] Island [Records] was because they wouldn't distribute singles from our albums in the United States." (In fact the group had reached No. 48 on the Billboard Hot 100 in 1973 with the Island release "(I Don't Want to Love You But) You Got Me Anyway").

Subsequent to the unsuccessful lead single release from Reach for the Sky, "Ain't Too Proud", "Arms of Mary" had a spring 1976 single release in both the UK and the US, affording the Sutherland Brothers and Quiver their UK chart debut. A Top of the Pops performance broadcast 8 May 1976 helped boost the track ten notches to No. 6 on the UK Singles Chart dated 15 May 1976 with a No. 5 peak the following week. "Arms of Mary" was also an international success, most notably in Ireland and the Netherlands - in which the track was No. 1 for respectively four and three weeks in those territories - with the track also spending two weeks at No. 1 on the Dutch charts for Belgium.

However, "Arms of Mary" did not afford the Sutherland Brothers the American hit in hopes of which they'd moved to CBS Records, as the track failed to accrue enough interest to rise higher than No. 81 on the Billboard Hot 100 in April 1976.

== Chilliwack version ==
"Arms of Mary"
- Side A of the original Canadian single

Single by Chilliwack

from the album Lights from the Valley
- B-side: "I Wanna Be the One"
- Released: June 1978
- Recorded: 1978
- Genre: Folk rock
- Length: 2:59
- Label: Mushroom
- Songwriter: Iain Sutherland
- Producers: Ross Turney; Bill Henderson; Marc Gilutin

Chilliwack singles chronology
"Baby Blue" (1977)	"Arms of Mary" (1978)	"Never Be the Same" (1978)

In 1978, Canadian band Chilliwack remade "Arms of Mary" for the group's seventh album release, which was entitled Lights from the Valley after the song's opening lyric. The album's lead single, "Arms of Mary" was recorded by Chilliwack at the suggestion of Marc Gilutin who had been recruited by Mushroom Records to co-produce the group after Mushroom had rejected two distinct sets of tracks - self-produced and self-penned by Chilliwack - which the group had submitted for potential release as their seventh album.

Lights from the Valley would be the only Chilliwack album not entirely self-produced by the group, and "Arms of Mary" would be the first (and it would prove only) non-original song to serve as a Chilliwack single release since the band had been rebranded from "The Collectors". Chilliwack mainstay Bill Henderson would recall he and his bandmates being unhappy with an "outside song" being a Chilliwack single: (Bill Henderson quote:) "All musicians have played other people’s songs [but] once you['ve launched a] recording career...you're supposed to do it yourself. That was something the Beatles started." Chilliwack would only ever record one other song not penned by a group member: "In Love With A Look" (Myers/ Jalananda) also featured on Lights from the Valley.

Reportedly "Arms of Mary" was playlisted by every key Canadian AM radio station with the exception of the most influential: CHUM-AM in Toronto whose disinterest would factor into the track's failure to become one of Chilliwack's most successful Canadian chart hits with a modest No. 49 peak. "Arms of Mary" would however become the fourth Chilliwack single to rank on the Hot 100 in Billboard with its No. 67 peak outranking the band's three previous Hot 100 entries. "Arms of Mary" would remain Chilliwack's last Hot 100 entry until 26 September 1981 when "My Girl (Gone, Gone, Gone)" debuted at No. 81: by its third week on the chart - that of 10 October 1981 - "My Girl..." had bested "Arms of Mary" as Chilliwack's highest ranking Hot 100 entry, "My Girl..."'s 10 October 1981 Hot 100 ranking being No. 60, with its eventual No. 22 peak setting up "My Girl... to remain Chilliwack's best-ever Hot 100 showing.

A live version of "Arms of Mary" appears on There and Back - Live a 2003 concert album by a latterday incarnation of Chilliwack fronted by Bill Henderson, who in 2022 would state he no longer nursed misgivings over "Arms of Mary"'s inclusion in the Chilliwack oeuvre: (Bill Henderson quote:) "It's a really nice song and people love it and I enjoy playing it."

== Other notable versions ==
The song was covered by Dutch singer Piet Veerman in 1992 for his seventh studio album In Between. It was released as a single and peaked at Number 44 on the Dutch charts.

== Charts ==
Sutherland Brothers and Quiver version

Chart (1976)	Peak position
Australia (Kent Music Report)	28
Belgium (Ultratop 50 Flanders)	1
Belgium (Ultratop 50 Wallonia)	47
Germany (GfK)	17
Ireland (IRMA)	1
Netherlands (Dutch Top 40)	1
Netherlands (Single Top 100)	1
New Zealand (Recorded Music NZ)	32
Rhodesia (Lyons Maid)	2
South Africa (Springbok Radio)	3
UK Singles (Official Charts)	5
US Billboard Hot 100	81
US Cash Box Top 100	71

Chilliwack version

Chart (1978)	Peak position
Canada Top Singles (RPM)	49
US Billboard Hot 100	67
US Cash Box Top 100	92

Piet Veerman version

Chart (1992)	Peak position
Netherlands (Single Top 100)	44
