= Turn It Loud =

Studio album by Headpins
- Released: 1982
- Studio: Little Mountain Sound Studios
- Genres: Rock; hard rock
- Length: 41:20
- Label: Solid Gold
- Producers: Brian MacLeod; Bill Henderson (assisted by Ab Bryant)

Headpins chronology
Turn It Loud (1982)	Line of Fire (1983)

Singles from Turn It Loud
- 1. "Winnin'" Released: 1982; 2. "Don't It Make Ya Feel" Released: 1982; 3. "Breakin' Down" Released: 1982

Turn It Loud is the debut studio album by Canadian hard rock band Headpins, released in 1982. By 1983, the album had been certified double platinum in Canada (in excess of 200,000 copies sold).

== Track listing ==
All tracks are written by Brian MacLeod unless otherwise noted.

No.	Title	Writer(s)	Length
1.	"Turn It Loud"		3:58
2.	"Keep Walkin' Away"	Brian MacLeod, Darby Mills, Ab Bryant, Bernie Aubin	4:35
3.	"Don't Ya Ever Leave"		5:33
4.	"People"		6:33
5.	"Don't It Make Ya Feel"	MacLeod, Mills	4:09
6.	"Winnin'"	MacLeod, Mills	4:02
7.	"You Can't Have Me"		5:29
8.	"Breakin' Down"		7:01
Total length:			41:20

== Personnel ==
Headpins

- Darby Mills – lead vocals
- Brian MacLeod – guitar
- Ab Bryant – bass
- Bernie Aubin – drums
- Scott Reid – guitar

Production

- Brian MacLeod – producer
- Bill Henderson – producer
- Ab Bryant – assistant to the producer
- Bob Defrin – art direction
- Patrick Glover – engineer
- Don Brautigam – illustration
- Bob Ludwig
- Sam Feldman – manager
- David Slagter

== Charts ==
Chart (1982–83)	Peak position
Canada Top Albums/CDs (RPM)	7

== Certifications ==
Region	Certification	Certified units/sales
Canada (Music Canada)	2× Platinum	200,000^{^}
^{^} Shipments figures based on certification alone.
