= UHF (disambiguation) =

UHF generally refers to "Ultra high frequency", a radio frequency range.

UHF may also refer to:

== Film and television ==
- UHF television broadcasting, the use of the UHF frequency range for television
- UHF (film), a 1989 comedy film starring "Weird Al" Yankovic and Michael Richards
- UHF (Independent UHF Broadcasting), a Japanese television network
- UHF anime, as programming carried by these Japanese independents

== Music ==
- UHF (Canadian band), a folk music supergroup
  - UHF (album)
  - UHF II
- UHF (Portuguese band), a rock band
- Ultra High Frequency (band), a New York-based alternative rock band
- UHF, an alias used for a one off single also titled "UHF" by Moby
- UHF – Original Motion Picture Soundtrack and Other Stuff, soundtrack to the film UHF

== Radio ==
- UHF CB, an Australian two-way radio service
- UHF connector, a threaded radio frequency coaxial connector

== Other ==
- UHF (Ultra High Frequency), a 1990s alternative fashion magazine spun off from Option
- Unrestricted Hartree–Fock, an SCF-MO method for calculating open-shell systems
- United Hospital Fund, a non-profit health policy research organization in New York, United States
- United Housing Foundation, a real estate investment trust in New York, United States
