= Grass and Wild Strawberries =

Grass & Wild Strawberries

Studio album by The Collectors
- Released: 1969
- Studio: The Sound Factory, Hollywood
- Genre: psychedelic rock, psychedelic pop
- Label: Warner Brothers/New Syndrome WS1774
- Producer: Dave Hassinger

The Collectors chronology
The Collectors (1968)	Grass & Wild Strawberries (1969)	Chilliwack (Chilliwack) (1970)

Grass and Wild Strawberries, released in 1969, is an album by the Canadian rock band The Collectors. The songs were written as part of prominent Canadian playwright George Ryga's stage play Grass and Wild Strawberries. The distinctly literary lyrics were written by Ryga. The song "Seventeenth Summer" was later re-recorded by Chilliwack and an extended jam based on it became a feature of their live performance. The fast-paced "Early Morning" was released as a single but did not become a major hit, reaching #84 on the RPM Magazine chart on July 12, 1969.

== Tracks ==
All songs: Music composed and arranged by The Collectors, lyrics by George Ryga.

1. "Prelude" (4:49)
2. "Grass & Wild Strawberries" (2:01)
3. "Things I Remember" (2:46)
4. "Don’t Turn Away (from Me)" (3:10)
5. "Teletype Click" (2:55)
6. "Seventeenth Summer" (3:29)
7. "The Long Rain" (2:57)
8. "My Love Delights Me" (2:23)
9. "Dream of Desolation" (2:30)
10. "Rainbow of Fire" (2:52)
11. "Early Morning" (3:28)
12. "Sheep On the Hillside" (4:17)

== Personnel ==
The Collectors

- Howie Vickers - lead vocals
- Claire Lawrence - saxophone, backing vocals, flute, harmonica, keyboards
- Bill Henderson - guitar, backing and lead vocals, keyboards
- Glenn Miller - bass, backing vocals
- Ross Turney - drums, percussion
