= Wanna Be a Star =

Studio album by Chilliwack
- Released: September 1981
- Studio: Waterstreet Sound, Vancouver
- Genre: Rock
- Length: 39:12
- Label: Solid Gold Records (CAN); Millennium Records (USA)
- Producer: Bill Henderson and Brian MacLeod

Chilliwack chronology
Breakdown in Paradise (1979)	Wanna Be a Star (1981)	Opus X (1982)

Professional ratings
Review scores
Source	Rating
Allmusic	4.5/5 stars

Wanna Be a Star is the ninth album by the Canadian rock band Chilliwack, released in September 1981. At this point, the band had collapsed into a trio, without a full-time drummer, but leader Bill Henderson and guitarist/keyboardist/drummer Brian MacLeod had become a powerful songwriting team during the interim. The single release "My Girl (Gone, Gone, Gone)" became the group's first hit since the 1979 collapse of their former label Mushroom Records, reaching #1 in Canada and giving Chilliwack their U.S. Top 40 breakthrough peaking at #22 on the Billboard Hot 100: "My Girl (Gone, Gone, Gone)" also gave Chilliwack their only evident chart item outside North America reaching #57 in Australia with a disproportionately long chart run of 28 weeks. The success of "My Girl (Gone, Gone, Gone)" led to a touring version of Chilliwack re-forming. The album's second single: "I Believe", released in early 1982, was also a Top 10 Canadian hit and returned Chilliwack to the U.S. Top 40 at #33. In November 1982, Wanna Be a Star was certified Platinum (in excess of 100,000 copies sold) in Canada.

Overall the album is something of a concept album about the "rock and roll" lifestyle and the pursuit of fame. The leadoff track "Sign Here" is a reference to Chilliwack's new quest for mainstream success, tempered by their brush with fame on Mushroom. This was the first album they recorded with Solid Gold Records in Canada, a new Toronto-based label.

== Track listing ==
1. "Sign Here" (Bill Henderson/Brian MacLeod) (2:57)
2. "So You Wanna Be a Star" (Henderson/MacLeod) (4:29)
3. "Tell It to the Telephone" (Henderson) (3:14)
4. "Too Many Enemies" (Henderson/MacLeod) (4:39)
5. "Living In Stereo" (4:49) (Henderson)
6. "Mr. Rock" (3:51) (Henderson)
7. "My Girl (Gone, Gone, Gone)" (Henderson/MacLeod) (4:16)
8. "(Don't Wanna) Live for a Living" (MacLeod) (3:22)
9. "Walk On" (Henderson) (3:38)
10. "I Believe" (Henderson) (3:57)

== Musicians ==
- Bill Henderson - vocals, guitars, keyboards
- Brian MacLeod - vocals, drums, guitars, keyboards
- Ab Bryant - bass
