= Dreams, Dreams, Dreams =

Studio album by Chilliwack
- Released: January 1977
- Recorded: 1976
- Studio: Can-Base Studios, Vancouver
- Genre: Rock
- Length: 37:38
- Label: Mushroom Records
- Producer: Bill Henderson, Ross Turney

Chilliwack chronology
Rockerbox (1975)	Dreams, Dreams, Dreams (1977)	Lights from the Valley (1978)

Dreams, Dreams, Dreams is the sixth album by the Canadian rock band Chilliwack. This was the eighth album (including two as The Collectors) done by the band's core of Bill Henderson, Glenn Miller and Ross Turney, and the third with Howard Froese. After Chilliwack's failure to find an audience with Rockerbox, this album (with the same lineup) marked the band's return to the top 10 in Canada with "Fly at Night" (which also charted in the US, at #75), while "California Girl" and "Baby Blue" were also Top 40 hits there. "Rain-O" was a remake of Chilliwack's second hit in 1970. Dreams, Dreams, Dreams was the first Canadian Platinum album for the band. It ranked number 13 for 2 weeks on the Canadian charts. It was number 76 in the top albums of 1977.

According to Bill Henderson's liner notes from the 2013 reissue, the band members at this time were all Scientologists, and the back of the album contains a dedication to L. Ron Hubbard.

== Track listing ==
1. "Fly at Night" (Henderson, Turney) (4:51)
2. "Baby Blue" (Henderson, Turney) (5:24)
3. "Rockin' Girl" (Henderson, Miller) (3:34)
4. "California Girl" (Henderson) (5:14)
5. "Roll On" (Henderson, Turney) (5:50)
6. "Something Better" (Henderson, Turney) (6:09)
7. "Rain-O" (Henderson, Turney, Miller, Lawrence) (5:44)
8. "Fly at Night (Reprise)" (Henderson, Turney) (0:52)

=== 2013 bonus tracks ===
1. 'Reach" (demo) (Henderson, Turney) (2:47)
2. "Something Better" (songwriting tape) (Henderson, Turney) (1:52)

== Singles ==
1. "California Girl" (Henderson) (2:57) (#74 CAN)
2. "Fly at Night" (Henderson, Turney) (3:29) (#7 CAN)
3. "Something Better" (Henderson, Turney) (3:29) (#56 CAN)
4. "Baby Blue" (Henderson, Turney) (3:19) (#78 CAN)
5. "Reach" (Henderson, Turney) (3:15) (b-side of California Girl and Something Better)
6. "Mary Lou & Me" (Henderson) (3:42) (b-side of Fly At Night)

"Fly at Night" was only issued as a promo in this format. The commercial release of the single is b/w "Mary Lou & Me". "Reach" is the flip side of "California Girl".

== Personnel ==
Chilliwack

- Bill Henderson - guitar, vocals, solina
- Glenn Miller - bass, vocals
- Ross Turney - drums, percussion
- Howard Froese - guitar, vocals, solina, piano
