= When I Sing =

When I Sing may refer to:

- "When I Sing", song by Bill Henderson (Canadian singer) from Bye Bye Blues (film) 1983 Juno Award
- "When I Sing", song by UHF from UHF 1990
- "When I Sing", song by Needtobreathe from Hard Love 2016
