= Chilliwack (band) =

Canadian rock band

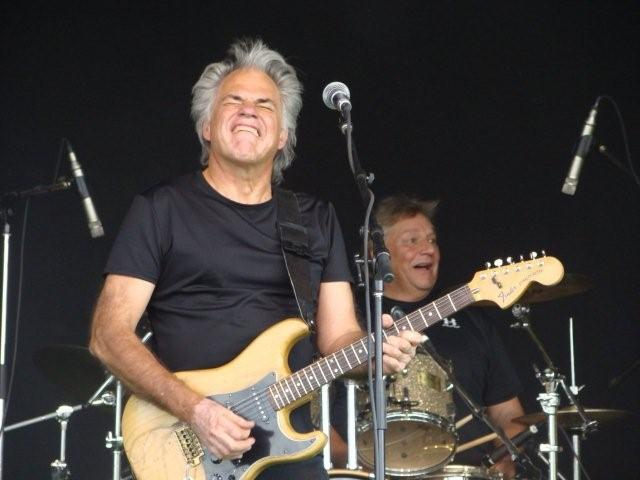
- Bill Henderson, guitarist and vocalist

Background information
- Origin: Vancouver, British Columbia, Canada
- Genres: Rock, progressive rock
- Years active: 1970–1988, 1997–present
- Labels: Parrot, A&M, Goldfish, Casino, Sire, Mushroom Records, Solid Gold, Millennium
- Members: Bill Henderson; Ed Henderson; Jerry Adolphe; Gord Maxwell
- Past members: Doug Edwards; Ross Turney; Claire Lawrence; Glenn Miller; Brian MacLeod; Howard Froese; Jamie Bowers; Ab Bryant; Bucky Berger; Rick Taylor; John Roles

Chilliwack is a Canadian rock band centered on the singer and guitarist Bill Henderson. They were active from 1970 to 1988; Henderson re-formed the band in 1997. The band started off with a progressive rock sound that incorporated elements of folk, indigenous, jazz and blues, before moving towards a more straight-ahead hard rock/pop rock sound by the mid-1970s. Their six best-selling songs were "My Girl (Gone, Gone, Gone)", "I Believe", "Whatcha Gonna Do", "Fly at Night", "Crazy Talk" and "Lonesome Mary". The band's line-up has changed many times.

== History ==
The band originated in Vancouver, British Columbia. The members of the C-FUN Classics changed the band's name to The Collectors when Bill Henderson joined in 1966. Their psychedelic self-titled debut album yielded the minor hit "Lydia Purple". Their second album was based on the musical score written by the band for Grass and Wild Strawberries, a stage play by Canadian playwright George Ryga.

Vocalist Howie Vickers left the Collectors in 1969; the remaining members formed the band Chilliwack in 1970, Chilliwack being a Salish term meaning "valley of many streams" and the name of a city east of Vancouver in the Fraser Valley. Chilliwack released its debut album, Chilliwack, in 1970.

Lead guitarist Bill Henderson led the remaining former Collectors members: Glenn Miller (bass, guitar, backing vocals), Ross Turney (drums) and Claire Lawrence (flute, saxophone, keyboards, backing vocals); while he provided most of the vocals and did most of the composing. During 1970, Miller briefly left the band, who were joined on the road by Robbie King (keyboards, bass) and played at Expo '70 in Japan and other gigs across Canada.

In 1971, bassist Rick Kilburn played live with Chilliwack for a short time before Miller returned later that same year when Lawrence departed. New member Howard Froese (guitar, keyboards, backing vocals) joined in 1973.

The band released several moderately successful records. Hit singles in Canada included "Lonesome Mary", which entered Cashbox January 22, 1972 (and was their first US charting single, peaking at #75 on the Billboard Hot 100 in February 1972), "Crazy Talk" (#98 in the US in January 1975), and "Fly at Night" (#75 in the US in May 1977). The track "Rain-o", a blues-based composition that appeared in different versions on their debut album, Chilliwack (June 1970) and the later Dreams, Dreams, Dreams (January 1977), was a well-known concert favourite, but far too long to be released as a single.

Chilliwack's debut was followed by two more albums: Chilliwack in September 1971 and All Over You in December 1972.

In April 1974 their album Riding High on Goldfish Records (Terry Jacks' label) contained one of their biggest hits, "Crazy Talk", which was produced by Jacks. This album was not released in the US until early 1975 (on the Sire Records label), where it was retitled Chilliwack (their third U.S. release to bear that title).

Chilliwack had a difficult time sustaining success because of constant changes of label. The two Collectors albums were on Warner Brothers and Chilliwack's first five albums were on four different labels in Canada: Parrot, A&M, Goldfish, and Casino Records.

Rockerbox, their fifth album, was released in December 1975 on Sire Records in the U.S. and (with a different cover) on the little-known Casino Records label in Canada. It was Chilliwack's least successful album in Canada.

The band was then signed to Vancouver's Mushroom Records, with distribution throughout North America. After completing one album for the label, Dreams, Dreams, Dreams, Chilliwack began work on their seventh album, to be titled Lights from the Valley. The first attempt at recording proved unsatisfactory, leading to discord among the band members. Froese was replaced by Brian MacLeod, who contributed guitar, drums, keyboards and backing vocals. The album was re-recorded, with some of Froese's vocal and guitar work, as well as percussion from session drummer Eddie Tuduri, included in the final mix. By the time of the record's release, bassist Glenn Miller and drummer Ross Turney had left the group. Mushroom was also having financial problems which hampered the promotion of the album after its release in June 1978.

Drummer Skip Layton and former Prism bassist Ab Bryant were recruited to perform with Henderson, MacLeod and Jamie Bowers (guitar and keyboards, who had also played on Lights from the Valley) in Chilliwack's 1978 live gigs. Henderson, MacLeod and Bryant then began working on Chilliwack's eighth album in 1979, joined by John Roles (guitar, keyboards, backing vocals) and drummer Bucky Berger. The Mushroom label went bankrupt abruptly shortly after their album Breakdown in Paradise was released in December 1979. Berger was replaced by Rick Taylor and the line-up of Henderson, MacLeod, Bryant, Roles and Taylor toured into 1980.

Chilliwack then signed with Solid Gold Records in Canada and Millennium Records in the U.S. in 1981 as a trio (Henderson/MacLeod/Bryant) and enjoyed its greatest success with this line-up, releasing the albums Wanna Be a Star (September 1981) and Opus X (October 1982). The singles "My Girl (Gone, Gone, Gone)" (Their first US Top 40 hit, peaking at #22 in December 1981), "I Believe" (US #33 in March 1982), and "Whatcha Gonna Do (When I'm Gone)" (US #41 in December 1982) were popular both in Canada and in the U.S. Rolling Stone wrote:

At their best, Chilliwack was the finest Canadian rock band, outrocking BTO and outwriting Burton Cummings. But a lack of consistency kept it from international success.

Henderson, MacLeod and Bryant were joined by drummer Paul Delaney in the fall of 1981 through early 1982 for U.S. promotional appearances on TV shows, like American Bandstand, Solid Gold and The Merv Griffin Show, before heading out on the road later in 1982 with an expanded line-up of Henderson, MacLeod, Bryant, Joey Franco (drums), Glenn Grayson (keyboards, backing vocals) and Dennis Grayson (keyboards, backing vocals).

Henderson and MacLeod received a Best Producer Juno Award for Opus X. However, echoing the Mushroom problems, Millennium Records then collapsed. In early 1983, MacLeod and Bryant left the band to devote more time to their other project, the Headpins (with Denise McCann and then Darby Mills as lead vocalists). Chilliwack's last studio recording, Look In Look Out, was released in July 1984 with Henderson as the only continuing member. He was joined by session players Ashley Mulford (guitar, backing vocals, from the band Sad Café), Richard Gibbs (keyboards, from the group Oingo Boingo), Mo Foster (bass), Simon Phillips (drums) and Tom Keenlyside (saxophone), with additional vocals provided by Mark LaFrance, Saffron and Camille Henderson, Dustin Keller and Bob Rock.

By 1985, the band was without a record deal, and Henderson cobbled together a touring line-up of former member Claire Lawrence (sax, backing vocals), Jerry Adolphe (drums), Brian Newcombe (bass), Robbie Gray (keyboards, backing vocals) and Dave Pickell (keyboards). Pickell was replaced almost immediately by another former member John Roles (guitar, keyboards) and bassist Newcombe was succeeded in 1986 by Lee Oliphant. This grouping played mostly in Canadian clubs and smaller venues until Henderson disbanded the group in December 1988. The following year, Henderson formed the folk-rock supergroup UHF.

On October 6, 1991, Henderson joined fellow rockers Loverboy, Bryan Adams, Colin James, and Chrissy Steele at a benefit show at Vancouver's 86 Street Music Hall to raise over $50,000 for Henderson's former Chilliwack bandmate, Brian MacLeod, who was fighting cancer and undergoing treatment at a Houston medical clinic. MacLeod died on April 25, 1992, aged 39.

After the band had been dormant for nearly a decade, Henderson decided to launch a new Chilliwack line-up in 1997, made up of himself, Adolphe (drums), Doug Edwards (bass, backing vocals), and Roy 'Bim' Forbes (guitar, backing vocals, from UHF). Forbes was succeeded on guitar in 1998 by Bill's brother, Ed, and Chilliwack released a new live album, There and Back - Live, in 2003.

Chilliwack performed at 2005's Voyageur Days Festival in Mattawa, Ontario, where they appeared with Moxy, Toronto, Trooper, Goddo, Killer Dwarfs, and Ray Lyell for the thirtieth anniversary of Moxy's debut album release.

On May 24, 2010, the band members (Bill Henderson, Ed Henderson, Doug Edwards and Jerry Adolphe) were joined by former members Roy 'Bim' Forbes, Ab Bryant and Claire Lawrence, plus Howard Froese's son Tyson on acoustic guitar (standing in for his father, who had died of cancer in the mid-1990s), and Collectors singer Howie Vickers for a Chilliwack 40th Anniversary show at the River Rock Show Theatre in Richmond, British Columbia.

Chilliwack's original bassist, Glenn Miller, died on March 4, 2011, in Toronto after suffering from muscular dystrophy.

In 2015, a new music video by Chilliwack for the song "Take Back This Land" was released. The song became a rallying call during the 2015 Canadian federal election.

Henderson occasionally does duo shows with Claire Lawrence. Chilliwack continues to play, mostly at outdoor gatherings and festivals.

Doug Edwards died at his home in Vancouver at the age of 70 on November 11, 2016, after a long illness. He was succeeded in Chilliwack by Gord Maxwell (formerly with Ian Tyson and One Horse Blue), who began filling in for Edwards in 2013.

Matt Bryant, son of former Chilliwack bass player Ab Bryant, is the singer/songwriter and founding member of the Canadian roots/folk band Headwater.

In 2019, Chilliwack was inducted into the Canadian Music Hall of Fame.

On January 22, 2022, Chilliwack played Toronto's Massey Hall with their friend Geoff Hicks briefly filling in on drums for an ill Adolphe.

== Current members ==
- Bill Henderson – lead guitar, lead and backing vocals (1966–1988, 1997–present)
- Jerry Adolphe – drums (1985–1988, 1997–present)
- Ed Henderson − rhythm and lead guitar, backing vocals (1998–present)
- Gord Maxwell – bass, backing vocals (2016–present)

== Discography ==
=== Albums ===
As the Collectors (pre-Chilliwack)

Year	Album
1967	The Collectors
1968	Grass and Wild Strawberries

Chilliwack

Year	Title	Chart positions		Certifications
Year	Title	CAN	US	CRIA
1970	Chilliwack	63	—	
1971	Chilliwack	10	210	
1972	All Over You	40	—	
1974	Riding High	63	—	
1975	Rockerbox	64	210	
1977	Dreams, Dreams, Dreams	13	142	Platinum
1978	Lights from the Valley	37	191	Platinum
1979	Breakdown in Paradise	52	—	
1981	Wanna Be a Star	19	78	Platinum
1982	Opus X	12	112	Platinum
1983	Segue (compilation)	79	—	Gold
1984	Look in Look Out	68	—	
1994	Greatest Hits	—	—	Gold
2003	There and Back – Live	—	—	
"—" denotes releases that did not chart.

=== Singles ===
Year	Song	Parent album	Peak chart positions					
Year	Song	Parent album	CAN RPM	CAN CHUM	US Hot 100	US Cash Box	US Main	AUS
1967	"Looking at a Baby" as the Collectors	Non-album singles	23	4	—	—	—	—
1967	"Fisherwoman" as the Collectors	Non-album singles	18	—	—	—	—	—
1968	"We Can Make It" as the Collectors	Non-album singles	99	—	—	—	—	—
1968	"Lydia Purple" as the Collectors	The Collectors	55	—	—	—	—	—
1969	"Early Morning" as the Collectors	Grass and Wild Strawberries	84	—	—	—	—	—
1970	"I Must Have Been Blind" as the Collectors	Non-album singles	56	20	—	—	—	—
1970	"Sometimes We're Up" as the Collectors	Non-album singles	63	—	—	—	—	—
1970	"Chain Train"	Chilliwack	67	—	—	—	—	—
1971	"Rain-O"	Chilliwack	70	—	—	—	—	—
1972	"Sundown"	Chilliwack	54	—	—	—	—	—
1973	"Lonesome Mary"	Chilliwack	9	—	75	—	—	—
1974	"Groundhog"	All Over You	41	—	—	—	—	—
1974	"Crazy Talk"	Riding High	10	13	98	—	—	—
1975	"There's Something I Like About That"	Riding High	85	—	—	—	—	—
1975	"Last Day of December"	Rockerbox	—	—	109	—	—	—
1976	"Come on Over"	Riding High	54	12	—	—	—	—
1976	"California Girl"	Dreams, Dreams, Dreams	74	—	—	—	—	—
1976	"Fly at Night"	Dreams, Dreams, Dreams	7	16	75	—	—	—
1978	"Something Better"	Dreams, Dreams, Dreams	56	—	—	—	—	—
1978	"Baby Blue"	Dreams, Dreams, Dreams	78	—	110	—	—	—
1978	"Arms of Mary"	Lights from the Valley	49	—	67	—	—	—
1979	"Never Be the Same"	Lights from the Valley	59	—	—	—	—	—
1980	"Communication Breakdown"	Breakdown in Paradise	86	—	—	—	—	—
1981	"My Girl (Gone, Gone, Gone)"	Wanna Be a Star	3	6	22	19	16	57
1982	"I Believe"	Wanna Be a Star	13	11	33	29	—	—
1982	"Whatcha Gonna Do (When I'm Gone)"	Opus X	17	10	41	32	29	—
1982	"Don't It Make You Feel Good"	Opus X	—	—	—	—	48	—
1983	"Secret Information"	Opus X	—	—	110	—	—	—
1983	"Don't Stop"	Look in Look Out	46	—	—	—	—	—
"—" denotes releases that did not chart or were not released in that territory.

Singles	CAN	CHUM	US
Total Hits	26	8	7
Top 40 Hits	10	8	2

== See also ==
- Canadian rock
- Music of Canada
- Music of Vancouver
- List of bands from British Columbia
- Delbrook Senior Secondary School
