= Giant crab =

Giant crab may refer to:

- Japanese spider crab (Macrocheira kaempferi), possesses the longest leg span of any marine crab species alive
- Coconut crab (Birgus latro), the largest terrestrial invertebrate species alive
- Tasmanian giant crab (Pseudocarcinus gigas), another large crab species

== See also ==
- Giant Enemy Crab, a 2006 Internet meme
- A Giant Crab Comes Forth debut album by Giant Crab (band)
