= Slipstream (Sutherland Brothers and Quiver album) =

Studio album by Sutherland Brothers and Quiver
- Released: 1976
- Studio: CBS Studios, New Bond Street, London
- Genre: Soft rock
- Label: CBS, Columbia
- Producer: Howard Albert, Ron Albert

Sutherland Brothers and Quiver chronology
Reach for the Sky (1975)	Slipstream (1976)	Down to Earth (1977)

Singles from Slipstream
- 1. "Secrets" Released: 1976; 2. "Wild Love" Released: 1976; 3. "If I Could Have Your Loving" Released: 1977

Slipstream is an album by Sutherland Brothers and Quiver, released in 1976 by CBS Records, shortly after their top ten single "Arms of Mary", and reached No. 49 on the UK Albums Chart. A single from the album, "Secrets" was released and reached No. 35 on the UK Singles Chart.

== Track listing ==
1. "Slipstream" (Iain Sutherland) - 2:31
2. "Wild Love" (Iain Sutherland) - 3:44
3. "Saturday Night" (Gavin Sutherland) - 2:28
4. "If I Could Have Your Loving" (Iain Sutherland) - 3:28
5. "Love on the Side" (Iain Sutherland) - 4:15
6. "Secrets" (Iain Sutherland) - 3:08
7. "Dark Powers" (Iain Sutherland) - 4:50
8. "Something's Burning" (Gavin Sutherland) - 3:56
9. "Sweet Cousin" (Iain Sutherland) - 3:00
10. "Midnight Rendezvous" (Gavin Sutherland) - 2:45
11. "The Prisoner" (Iain Sutherland) - 4:08
12. "High Nights" (Tim Renwick - Instrumental) - 2:32

== Production ==
- Produced by Ron Albert and Howard Albert (A Fat Albert Production)
- Engineered by Mike Ross
- Mixed at Criteria Studios, London.

== Personnel ==
- Gavin Sutherland
- Iain Sutherland
- Tim Renwick - guitar
- John "Willie" Wilson - drums
- String and horn parts arranged and conducted by Mike Lewis
- Albhy Galuten - keyboards
- "Flaco" Pedron - percussion
