= West End Girls (Canadian band) =

Canadian band

- Origin: Vancouver, British Columbia Canada
- Genres: R&B / Pop
- Years active: 1990–1994
- Label: A&M Canada
- Members: Camille Henderson; Aimee MacKenzie; Silvana Petrozzi; Janele Woodley; Celia-Louise Martin

West End Girls were a Canadian pop band and girl group formed in 1990 in Vancouver, British Columbia.

== History ==
The band was formed in Vancouver by producers John Dexter and John Livingston, and consisted of three teenaged girls, Camille Henderson, Aimee MacKenzie, and Silvana Petrozzi. After several months of performing lessons with Henderson's father Bill Henderson, the lead singer of rock group Chilliwack, the trio recorded and released their debut album, West End Girls, on Johnny Jet Records in 1991. That album produced the Canadian hits "Not Like Kissing You" and "I Want U Back" (a remake of the Jackson 5 hit), "Say You'll Be Mine" and "Show Me the Way". "Not Like Kissing You" was their most successful hit in Canada, topping The Record's Retail Singles chart and reaching number 12 on the RPM 100 Hit Tracks chart.

Petrozzi left the band in 1992, and was replaced by Janele Woodley. In 1993, shortly before the release of the group's second album, Henderson also left and was replaced by Celia-Louise Martin. In 1993, the band's new lineup released the album We Belong Together, which included the singles "R U Sexin' Me", "Pure", and "Sexy'". Their second album wasn't as successful as their first one and they broke up the following year. Shortly afterwards, the group's record label released a remix album of some of their earlier hits.

They received a Juno Award nomination for Most Promising Group of the Year in 1992, and they also toured with Roxette on the Canadian leg of that group's 1992 Canadian tour.

MacKenzie later joined the Canadian R & B group D-Cru, and their single "Show Me" sampled the West End Girls single "Show Me The Way". She is now a swimsuit model.

Petrozzi/Kane later formed Pacifika with guitarist Adam Popowitz, bassist Toby Peter, and percussionist Elliot Polsky. Their first album, Asunción, was released in 2007 and their second, Super Magique, was released in 2010. Kane released a solo album, La Jardinera, in November 2012.

Henderson later toured extensively as a backing vocalist for Sarah McLachlan and performed lead vocals on Delerium's track "Duende". She is now a vocal coach.

Woodley later formed the pop rock duo A Perfect Day with Joseph Hrechka and they released the album All Over Everything in 2004.

Martin has done occasional acting gigs.

== Discography ==
=== Albums ===
- West End Girls, 1991 (Johnny Jet Records/A&M Records)
- We Belong Together, 1993 (Johnny Jet Records/A&M Records)
- Hits, Remixes and Other Cool Stuff, 1997 (Dexter Entertainment Group)
- The Definitive Collection, 2000 (Dexter Entertainment Group)

=== Singles ===
| Year | Song | CAN |
|---|---|---|
| 1991 | "Not Like Kissing You" | 12 |
| 1991 | "I Want You Back" | 21 |
| 1992 | "Say You'll Be Mine" | 39 |
| 1992 | "Show Me the Way" | 34 |
| 1993 | "R U Sexin Me" | 82 |
| 1993 | "Pure (You're Touching Me)" | - |
| 1993 | "Sexy" | - |
| 1994 | "State of the Heart" | 54 |

=== Soundtrack use ===
- In 1999, "Sexy" was featured in the beginning of lesbian cult classic movie Better Than Chocolate, as was "Pure (You're Touching Me)".

Cover Version: In 1992, Hong Kong singer/actress Sammi Cheng Sau Man covered "Say You'll Be Mine" in her Cantonese album Never Too Late.
