= Opus X =

Studio album by Chilliwack
- Released: October 1982
- Recorded: Spring–summer 1982
- Studio: Little Mountain Sound Studios, Vancouver
- Genre: Rock
- Length: 39:26
- Label: Solid Gold Records (CAN); Millennium Records (USA)
- Producer: Bill Henderson & Brian MacLeod

Chilliwack chronology
Wanna Be a Star (1981)	Opus X (1982)	Segue (1983)

Opus X is the tenth album (hence the "X") by the Canadian rock band Chilliwack, released in October 1982. Producers Bill Henderson and Brian MacLeod received the Juno Award for "Producer of the Year" for their work on the songs "Whatcha Gonna Do" and "Secret Information" from this album. The precedent Chilliwack album Wanna Be a Star had provided the group with its first two U.S. Top 40 hits: Opus X almost continued that success with its lead single: "Whatcha Gonna Do (When I'm Gone)", rising as high as #41 on the Billboard Hot 100, #32 on Cash Box and #9 in Canada. In January 1983, "Opus X" was certified Platinum (in excess of 100,000 copies sold) in Canada.

Despite the success of this album, MacLeod and Bryant quit Chilliwack to play full-time with their group The Headpins just after the Juno Awards.

The album was remastered and released on CD for the first time in 2002.

== Track listing ==
All songs written by Bill Henderson & Brian MacLeod unless noted.

1. "Whatcha Gonna Do (When I'm Gone)" (4:14)
2. "Secret Information" (Henderson) (3:33)
3. "She Don't Know" (4:27)
4. "Night Time" (3:51)
5. "Lean on Me" (4:14)
6. "Don't It Make You Feel Good" (4:21)
7. "Really Don't Mind" (4:42)
8. "You're Gonna Last" (5:11)
9. "Midnight" (4:53)

== Musicians ==
- Bill Henderson — lead vocals; harmony vocals (tracks 1–5, 8), keyboards (tracks 2, 5, 8, 9), guitar (tracks 2, 4, 9), slide guitar (track 7)
- Ab Bryant — bass; gang vocals (tracks 2, 6)
- Brian MacLeod — drums; guitar (tracks 1–8), keyboards (tracks 1–6), bass vocals (tracks 2–4), backing vocals (tracks 3–5, 7), gang vocals (track 6), congas (track 9)
