= Whatcha Gonna Do? =

Whatcha Gonna Do may refer to:

- Whatcha Gonna Do? (Peter Green album) 1981
- Whatcha Gonna Do? (Jayo Felony album) 1998
- "What'cha Gonna Do" (The Drifters song), 1955
- "Whatcha Gonna Do?" (song), a 1977 song by Pablo Cruise
- "What'cha Gonna Do", a 1999 song by Eternal
- "Whatcha Gonna Do", a 1988 demo by Alice in Chains from Music Bank
- "Whatcha Gonna Do", a 1953 song by Bill Haley & His Comets, B-side to the single "Crazy Man, Crazy"
- "Whatcha Gonna Do", a song by Billie Piper from the 1998 release Honey to the B
- "Whatcha Gonna Do?", a demo by Bob Dylan from The Bootleg Series Vol. 9
- "Whatcha Gonna Do (When I'm Gone)", a song by Chilliwack from the 1982 release Opus X

== See also ==
- "Watcha Gon' Do?", a song by Puff Daddy & The Family from the 1997 release No Way Out (Puff Daddy album)
- "What U Gon' Do", a 2004 song by Lil Jon & the Eastside Boyz from Crunk Juice
- "What You Gonna Do???", a 2020 song by Bastille from Goosebumps
- "Whatcha Gonna Do About It", a 1965 song by Small Faces from their self-titled album
- "What'cha Gonna Do About It", a 1963 song by Doris Troy
- "Bad Boys" (Inner Circle song), a 1987 song with the repeated lyrics "Watcha gonna do?"
