= A Giant Crab Comes Forth =

Studio album by Giant Crab
- Released: 1968
- Genres: Psychedelic music, Pop rock, blue-eyed soul
- Length: 43:19
- Label: Universal City Records
- Producer: Bill Holmes

Giant Crab chronology
A Giant Crab Comes Forth (1968)	Cool It...Helios (1968)

A Giant Crab Comes Forth is the debut album of the band The Giant Crab. It was released in 1968 by MCA's Universal City Records (UNI). Giant Crab evolved from Ernie and the Emperors, a popular local band out of Santa Barbara, California.

== Personnel ==
Giant Crab was formed around three Orosco brothers, Ernie, Raymond, and Ruben, all originally from the group Ernie & The Emperors. They added the stylings of brothers Dennis and Kenny Fricia to complete their line-up for their debut album. It also included a title track narrative by radio DJ, Johnny Fairchild.

- Ernie Orosco (Lead singer, lead guitar, rhythm guitar, 12-string guitar, vocal harmonies)
- Raymond Orosco (12-string, dry box, and bass guitars, clavinet, special effects, and vocal harmonies)
- Ruben Orosco (Bass guitar, drums, saxophones, special effects, and vocal harmonies)
- Dennis Fricia (Drums, horn (instrument), special effects, and vocal harmonies)
- Kenny Fricia (Organ (instrument), piano, clavinet, horns, vibes, special effects and vocal harmonies)

== Album content ==
The album leads off with an unusual tone, a title track narrated in the style of a news report by Johnny Fairchild. Fairchild was a local DJ from the Santa Barbara, California radio station, Radio K.I.S.T. He is given credit for the band's first radio air play. Fairchild's narration in the title track encompasses the titles of all the tracks in the album to follow. The words from the title track are written on the back cover of the original LP, in the style of a track listing. They are as follows:

"News has it that a giant crab has come forth out of the sea of music and is catching on and spreading across the land. Through struggles and hardships, ups and downs, trials and tribulations, a tiny amoeba, fighting for existence has grown into a giant crab. It started with a little kiss, of enthusiasm and the directions of the giant crab at this point are unknown. But they could pop up at any minute in you home. So watch your step for this musical giant is out to intensify your soul. The giant crab's only hope is that you will enjoy it enough to become involved in a hot line conversation that will spread :across the land. If you or I enjoy being the boy or girl it is our duty to inform Lydia Purple and the rest of the world...Flash...It has just been reported that :the giant crab is about to invade Groovy Towne inland, coming thru the fields. The chance you take is yours alone. Can you get out of the magic grasp of the giant crab? Believe it or not, The answer is no. For once you have felt the golden touch of the giant crab you will be shouting hi ho silver lining along with thousands of other helpless people caught up in their grasp. Why am I so proud? Listen and you will :see...Listen...Listen...Listen...Listen..."

The album consists of 11 original tracks, written primarily by Ernie Orosco, and four cover songs. Their take on Joey Levine's "I Enjoy Being The Boy" is the band's version of "I Enjoy Being A Boy", a song popularized by The Banana Splits on their TV show. Their version of "Lydia Purple", a cover of The Collectors (from their self-titled debut, The Collectors) is one of three versions of the song that were released by different bands that year, and it is arguably Giant Crab's most complicated arrangement on the album. The band chose "Hi Ho Silver Lining" as a single, likely because a version of the song was already a hit in the U.K. for The Jeff Beck Group.

== Track listing ==
Side one

1. "A Giant Crab Comes Forth" (Johnny Fairchild, Bill Holmes) – 2:18
2. "It Started with a Little Kiss" (Ernie Orosco) – 2:30
3. "Directions" (E. Orosco) – 3:03
4. "Watch Your Step" (E. Orosco) – 2:37
5. "Intensify Your Soul" (E. Orosco, Ruben Orosco) – 2:30
6. "Enjoy It" (Scott English, C. Ogerman) – 2:04
7. "Hot Line Conversation" (E. Orosco) – 3:00
8. "I Enjoy Being the Boy" (Joey Levine, M. Bellack) – 2:45

Side two

1. "Lydia Purple" (D. Dorin, T. McCashen) – 2:42
2. "Groovy Towne" (E. Orosco, B. Holmes) – 2:37
3. "Thru the Fields" (E. Orosco, B. Holmes) – 2:39
4. "The Chance You Take" (E. Orosco) – 2:44
5. "Believe It or Not" (E. Orosco) – 2:54
6. "The Answer Is No" (E. Orosco) – 2:59
7. "Hi Ho Silver Lining" (S. English, Larry Weiss) – 2:30
8. "Why Am I So Proud?" (E, Orosco, R. Orosco) – 4:07

== Resurgence and reissue ==
Although "A Giant Crab Comes Forth" failed to gain commercial or critical success upon its first release in 1968, it has made a more recent comeback in popularity.

In 2012 the album saw two new CD releases on separate labels. Kismet released a version with an identical track listing and running time to the original release, with the addition of new liner notes. Estrella Rockera released the album with a bonus track cover of Rain's "E.S.P.".
