= There and Back – Live =

There and Back - Live

Live album by Chilliwack
- Released: June 2003 (Canada); December 30, 2003 (elsewhere)
- Recorded: 2000–2003, Canada
- Genre: Rock
- Length: 77:35
- Label: Paradise Productions
- Producer: Bill Henderson

Chilliwack chronology
Greatest Hits (1994)	There and Back - Live (2003)	Anthology (2004)

There and Back - Live is an album by the Canadian rock band Chilliwack released in June 2003.

== Track listing ==
1. "Fly At Night" (Henderson, Turney) (5:03)
2. "Lonesome Mary" (Henderson) (5:14)
3. "I Believe" (Henderson) (5:25)
4. "Crazy Talk" (Henderson) (6:09)
5. "Communication Breakdown" (Henderson) (4:15)
6. "Trial By Fire" (Henderson, MacLeod, Roles) (3:35)
7. "Groundhog" (Traditional; arranged by Henderson and Turney) (4:48)
8. "Whatcha Gonna Do" (Henderson, MacLeod) (4:06)
9. "Arms of Mary" (Sutherland) (3:15)
10. "Baby Blue" (Henderson, Turney) (6:18)
11. "California Girl" (Henderson) (4:12)
12. "Something I Like About That" (Henderson, Turney) (2:58)
13. "17th Summer" (Ryga, Henderson, Lawrence, Miller, Turney) (9:13)
14. "Rain-O" (Henderson) (7:33)
15. "My Girl (Gone, Gone, Gone)" (Henderson, MacLeod) (5:31)

== Musicians ==
- Bill Henderson: lead vocals, guitars
- Ed Henderson: guitar, background vocals
- Doug Edwards: bass, background vocals
- Jerry Adolphe: drums
- Saffron & Camille Henderson: backing vocals
