= Breakdown in Paradise =

Studio album by Chilliwack
- Released: December 1979
- Studio: Mushroom Studios, Vancouver
- Genre: Rock
- Length: 35:49
- Label: Mushroom Records
- Producer: Bill Henderson, Brian MacLeod

Chilliwack chronology
Lights from the Valley (1978)	Breakdown in Paradise (1979)	Wanna Be a Star (1981)

Breakdown in Paradise is the eighth album by the Canadian rock band Chilliwack, released in December 1979. The album was originally intended to be called Road to Paradise, but the death of Mushroom Records head Shelly Siegel in January 1979 made the collapse of the label, which had released each of Chilliwack's last three albums, all but certain. In addition, after the last album three of the longstanding band members left the group, leaving only Bill Henderson and Brian MacLeod from the prior lineup. Throughout recording, the band was tinkering with its lineup, and only bass player Ab Bryant continued to appear with the group after Mushroom's collapse.

Because of the label's financial problems, there were no real hits from the album.

== Critical reception ==
In the review of Billboard issued on May 3, 1980, staff highlighted "Communication Breakdown" and found its melodic line catchy.

== Track listing ==
1. "Communication Breakdown" (Henderson) (3:45)
2. "Trial By Fire" (MacLeod, Henderson, Roles) (3:26)
3. "Guilty" (Henderson) (3:24)
4. "148 Heavy" (Henderson, MacLeod) (3:55)
5. "Let It All Begin" (MacLeod, Henderson) (3:37)
6. "So Strong" (Henderson) (3:53)
7. "Last Time" (Henderson) (4:37)
8. "Are You With Me" (Henderson) (4:52)
9. "Road to Paradise" (MacLeod, Henderson) (4:20)

== Personnel ==
Chilliwack

- Bill Henderson - guitar, lead and backing vocals
- Brian MacLeod - guitar, backing vocals, lead vocals on 5, synthesizer, piano, vibes, drums on 2,5.6-9
- Ab Bryant - bass
- John Roles - guitar, "stratospheric" backing vocals
- Bucky Berger - drums on 1, 3, 4

During the album's recording, Berger had left and was replaced after the album was finished by Rick Taylor. Consequently, Taylor's photo appears on the back cover.
