= Camille Henderson =

Canadian singer

Camille Henderson is a Canadian pop singer.

She played the role of Shirley in Sandy Wilson's 1985 Canadian film My American Cousin. She went on to become part of the Vancouver-based pop group West End Girls from 1991 to 1993. Following her departure from the band in 1993, Henderson became a backing vocalist for Sarah McLachlan, and also appeared as a vocalist on albums by Delerium and on "You Should Come Over" from the 1998 54-40 album "Since When". She can be seen performing live on McLachlan's Mirrorball DVD.

She is the daughter of Bill Henderson, a singer-songwriter and music producer associated with the bands Chilliwack and UHF, and is a vocal instructor in Vancouver. Her older sister Saffron Henderson is also a singer and well-known voice actress.
