= George Ryga =

Canadian playwright, actor and novelist

- Born: 27 July 1932; Deep Creek, Alberta
- Died: 18 November 1987 (aged 55); Summerland, BC
- Occupations: Playwright and novelist
- Years active: 1961–1987
- Known for: Plays and novels with social issues
- Notable work: The Ecstasy of Rita Joe

George Ryga (27 July 1932 – 18 November 1987) was a Canadian playwright and novelist. His writings explored the experiences of Indigenous peoples in Canada, among other themes. His most famous work is The Ecstasy of Rita Joe.

== Early years ==
Ryga was born in Deep Creek near Athabasca, Alberta to poor Ukrainian immigrant parents. Unable to continue his schooling past grade six, he worked at a variety of jobs, including radio copywriter. Ryga continued to study, taking correspondence courses, and winning a scholarship to the Banff School of Fine Arts. In 1955, he traveled to Europe, where he attended the World Assembly for Peace in Helsinki and worked for the BBC. The following year he returned to Canada.

== Career ==
While living in Edmonton, he published his first book, Song of My Hands (1956), a collection of poems.

Ryga's first play, Indian, was performed on television in 1961. He achieved national exposure with The Ecstasy of Rita Joe in 1967. The work, considered by many to be the most important English-language play by a Canadian playwright, is the story of a young native woman arriving in the city who finds that she has no place with either her own people or the white man. It was performed in Vancouver, at the National Arts Centre in Ottawa and in Washington state. In 1971, the work was performed as a ballet by the Royal Winnipeg Ballet.

Other plays by Ryga include:

- Captives of the Faceless Drummer – 1971
- Sunrise on Sarah – 1972
- Portrait of Angelica – 1973
- Ploughmen of the Glacier – 1977
- In the Shadow of the Vulture – 1985
- Paracelsus – 1986
- Summerland – 1992

He made a significant contribution to popular music when he wrote lyrics for a series of songs composed by the members of the Vancouver-based band The Collectors for the soundtrack of his 1969 play Grass and Wild Strawberries. Early Morning, the single release from the resulting Grass & Wild Strawberries album, became a minor local hit, and the showstopping album track Seventeenth Summer was re-recorded by the band after it underwent a membership change and changed its name to Chilliwack. The distinctive track, strongly influenced by First Nations musical forms, became a signature tune in live shows by Chilliwack for many years afterward.

== Death ==
He died in Summerland, British Columbia in 1987. His home was turned into the George Ryga Centre, an arts and culture centre, which existed until 2012 when it closed due to financial challenges. It is now in private hands.

== Recognition ==
A biography, The Ecstasy of Resistance, by James Hoffman, was published in 1995.

Since 2004, the George Ryga Award for Social Awareness in Literature has been presented to a British Columbian writer who has published a book with significant social themes. The 2021 recipient was Geoff Mynett.

A wall plaque to commemorate George Ryga was installed in the newly-opened Summerland Library in October of 2015. In 2016 the Ryga Arts Festival, inspired by George Ryga, was started in Summerland and has continued through 2026. In 2020, a George Ryga archive was established at the Summerland Museum.

== Bibliography ==
- Song of My Hands. 1956
- Hungry Hills. 1963
- Ballad of a Stone-Picker. 1966
- The Ecstasy of Rita Joe. 1970
- The Ecstasy of Rita Joe and Other Plays. 1971
- Sunrise on Sarah - 1973
- Night Desk. 1976
- Ploughman of the Glacier. 1977
- Seven Hours to Sundown. 1977
- Beyond the Crimson Morning. 1979
- Two Plays: Paracelsus and Prometheus Bound. 1982
- A Portrait of Angelica & A Letter to My Son. 1984
- In the Shadow of the Vulture. 1985
- The Athabasca Ryga - 1990
- Summerland. 1992
- George Ryga: The Other Plays. 2004 (edited by James Hoffman)
- George Ryga: The Prairie Novels. 2004 (edited by James Hoffman)

== Film ==
- 2009 - Hungry Hills
- 2018 - Just a Ploughboy: A film about George Ryga, written and directed by Gina Payzant Reel Mensch Studios, Edmonton, AB, Canada.
