= UHF II =

Studio album by UHF
- Released: 1994
- Genre: Rock

UHF chronology
UHF (1990)	UHF II (1994)

UHF II is an album by the rock band UHF, released in 1994. This was the group's second release, consisting of live, acoustic performances.

== Tracks ==
This album consists of the following twelve tracks:

1. "Lifting My Heart" (3:57)
2. "Watching the River Run" (3:41)
3. "Wild One" (3:27)
4. "Don’t You Cry" (4:19)
5. "There Must Be Some Way" (4:31)
6. "Changed Forever" (3:21)
7. "Boiling River" (4:10)
8. "Stand" (3:26)
9. "I’m On the Edge" (3:40)
10. "Time Will Take Its Toll" (4:23)
11. "Goodbye" (3:42)
12. "Call Up an Old Friend" (4:06)

== Artists ==
The three group members are credited with performing vocals and various instruments:

- Bill Henderson – guitar, accordion, vocals
- Shari Ulrich – piano, violin, mandolin, rhythm guitar, vocals
- Roy Forbes – guitar, mandolin, vocals
