= UHF (album) =

Studio album by UHF
- Released: 1990
- Genre: Rock

UHF chronology
UHF (1990)	UHF II (1994)

UHF is an album by the Canadian rock band UHF, consisting of singer-songwriters Bill Henderson of Chilliwack fame, Shari Ulrich, and Roy Forbes. It was released in 1990.

== Tracks ==
1. "When I Sing" (3:25)
2. "Holding Out for You" (4:00)
3. "Keep Lightin’ That Fire" (3:55)
4. "Day by Day" (4:42)
5. "Golan Boys" (4:01)
6. "Running Back to Her" (3:56)
7. "House Up On the Hill" (4:58)
8. "Can’t Go Home" (3:20)
9. "When Life Explodes" (3:59)
10. "One Step Closer to the Light" (2:52)
11. "Wings for the Sky" (4:45)
12. "Do I Love You" (4:05)

== Members ==
- Bill Henderson – guitar, piano, vocals
- Shari Ulrich – piano, violin, mandolin, vocals
- Roy Forbes – guitar, vocals
