= Chilliwack (1970 album) =

Studio album by Chilliwack
- Released: June 1970
- Recorded: 1969, A&R Studios, New York
- Genres: Rock, jazz rock, psychedelic rock, progressive rock, soft rock
- Length: 37:56
- Label: Parrot Records / London Records
- Producer: Chilliwack

Chilliwack chronology
Chilliwack (1970)	Chilliwack (1971)

Chilliwack is the first album by the Canadian rock band Chilliwack, released in June 1970. Chilliwack was a continuation of the psychedelic-progressive group The Collectors, except without lead singer Howie Vickers.

== Track listing ==
1. "Sundown" (Henderson, Lawrence) (5:37)
2. "Every Day" (Lawrence) (3:41)
3. "Seventeenth Summer" (Ryga, Henderson, Lawrence, Miller, Vickberg, Turney) (6:02)
4. "Ballad" (Henderson) (4:57)
5. "I've Got You Fixed" (Miller) (3:46)
6. "Rain-O" (Henderson) (6:46)
7. "Chain Train" (Lawrence) (7:07)

== Singles ==
- "Chain Train" (Lawrence) (3:04)
  - Stereo Single Mix
    - Released as Parrot single PAR 350
    - B-Side: "Osaka"
  - Mono Single Mix
    - Released as Parrot single 45-350
    - DJ Promo only
    - B-Side: "I Must Have Been Blind"
- "Rain-O" (Henderson) (3:03)
  - Single Version
  - Released as Parrot single PAR 2535
  - B-Side: "I've Got You Fixed"
- "Every Day" (Lawrence) (2:54)
  - Single Version
  - Released as Parrot single PAR 2536
  - B-Side: "Sundown"
- "Sundown" (Henderson/Lawrence) (3:24)
  - Single Version
  - B-Side of "Every Day" Single
- "I Must Have Been Blind" (Lawrence/Turney/Miller/Henderson) (3:10)
  - B-Side of "Chain Train" DJ promo single
  - Previously released in stereo by The Collectors as London single M-17379 in January 1970
- "Osaka" (Miller) (2:23)
  - B-Side of "Chain Train" Stereo single

== Personnel ==
Chilliwack

- Bill Henderson - guitar, piano; lead vocals on "Sundown", "Seventeenth Summer", "Ballad", "Rain-O"; co-lead vocals on "Every Day"
- Claire Lawrence - flute, saxophone, organ, piano; lead vocals on "Chain Train"; co-lead vocals on "Every Day"
- Glenn Miller - bass, guitar; lead vocals on "I've Got You Fixed"
- Ross Turney - drums
