= Chrissy Steele =

Canadian rock singer

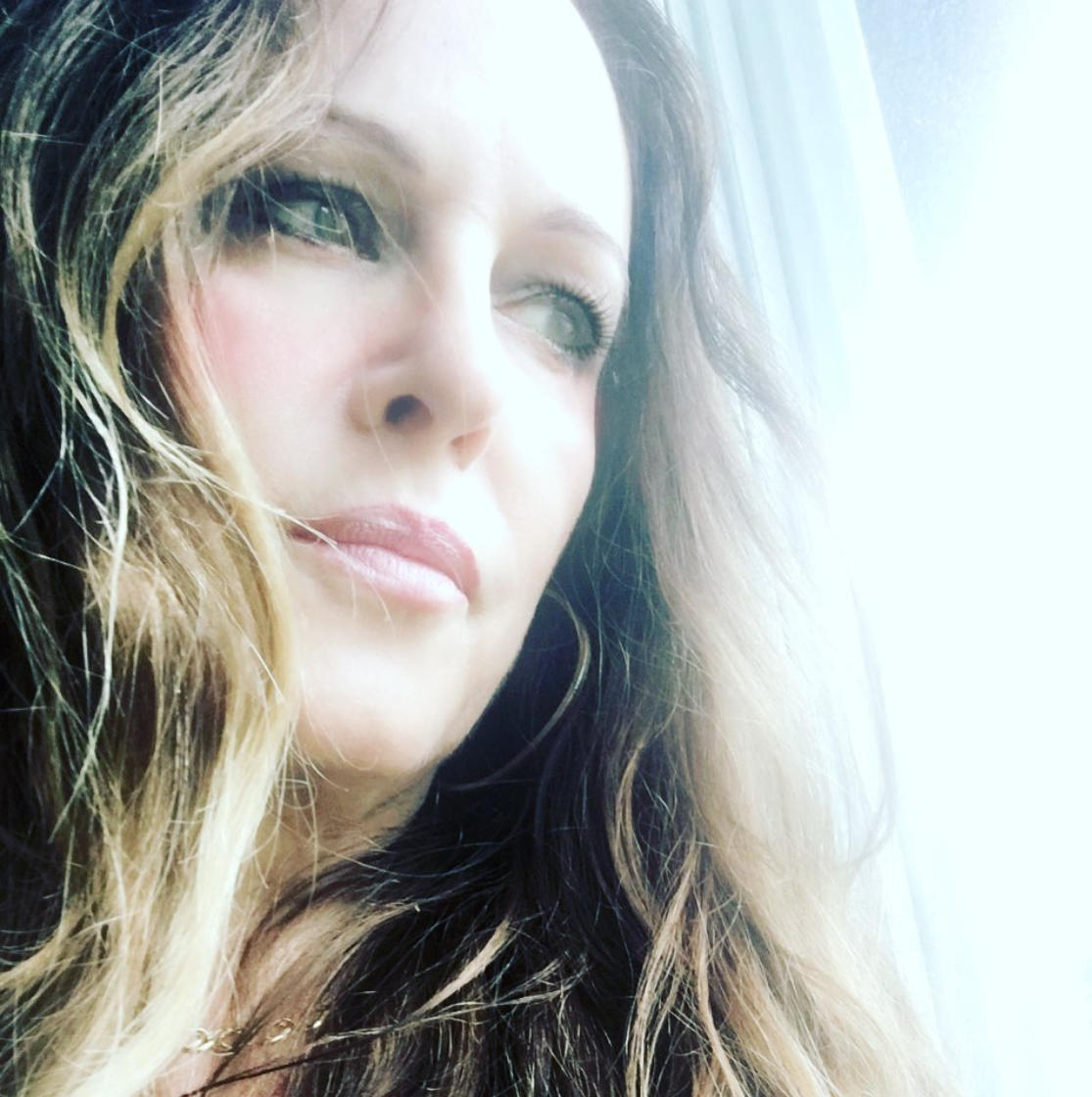
- Steele in 2021

Background information
- Born: Christina Southern
- Genres: Rock
- Occupation: Singer
- Instrument: Vocals
- Years active: 1990s, 2021–present
- Label: Chrysalis Records
- Formerly of: Headpins

Chrissy Steele is the stage name of Christina Southern, a Canadian vocalist currently living on Vancouver Island. She is most noted for garnering a Juno Award nomination for Most Promising Female Vocalist and Hard Rock Album of the Year at the Juno Awards of 1992.

== History ==
=== Early life ===
Steele's early years were spent singing classical and folk music. She participated in several choirs and school operas in her hometown of Comox and later in Victoria with Pacific Opera on soprano duties (both on Vancouver Island). At the age of 19, she moved to Vancouver to become a professional singer, but found she was lacking the confidence to front a band. She returned to Victoria and after she answered an ad in the local newspaper she joined her first band Room Service in 1984 where she performed in various rock clubs and on TV in the CBC competition Rock Wars, which was televised nationally. A year later, she accepted a gig playing with the hard rock band Reform School. The band gave her a foundation as a front person playing clubs in B.C and Alberta with several bands including Blu, and the first incarnation of the Chrissy Steele Band with several members including Burke Ehmig, Rick Smook, Matteo Caratozzolo, Lance Abermak and Brian McConkey, amongst others.

=== Career ===
In 1989, Brian MacLeod, after hearing about her talents, invited her to join his band Headpins, which had been looking for a new singer since Darby Mills left the band in 1986. However, with the rest of the original Headpins having moved on to other projects, MacLeod instead decided to record a new album with Steele. The majority of songs were written by Brian MacLeod and Tim Feehan. MacLeod and Steele with the help of their manager Sam Feldman, and Bruce Allen would be shopped to labels, finally hooking to Chrysalis Records, newly acquired by Thorn EMI. With an introduction to New York Chrysalis executives John Sykes (President) and Joe Keiner (CEO), and flying out to see the band live, Macleod and Steele were signed to a multi-million multi-album record deal. Sadly, during production of the album and a warm-up tour, MacLeod became ill, and after the release of the album he succumbed to cancer on April 25, 1992. During his illness, and incapacitation, it was thought best by the label for Steele to continue on as a solo artist after signing with the American branch of the label Chrysalis.

The album, Magnet to Steele, was released in 1991, and spawned the hit singles "Love You 'Til It Hurts" and "Love Don't Last Forever".

With a touring band consisting of Joe Wowk (replacing Brian MacLeod) on guitars, Tim Webster on keyboards, Anton Vogt on bass and Rick Fedyk on drums, Steele supported the album first playing with Bryan Adams in Revelstoke in 1991, then with a cross-Canada tour as an opening act for Bryan Adams, and in the United States as an opener for Jethro Tull's entire Catfish Rising American Tour . Steele also played as part of the line up at Thunderbird stadium in Vancouver for Molson's Great Canadian Party on July 1, 1992 featuring (in order of appearance) Eugene Ripper, The Grapes of Wrath, SkyDiggers, Rita Chiarelli, Crash Test Dummies, Chrissy Steele, Colin James, The Tragically Hip, and Spinal Tap. In addition to her Juno nomination for Most Promising Female Vocalist, Magnet to Steele was a nominee for Rock Album of the Year.

After the album had run its course commercially, her record label flew her to Los Angeles to record demos for her follow-up album, but Steele felt the material wasn't a good fit. She was no longer comfortable with the "sexpot biker-chick" image she was being marketed under, but instead wanted to adopt a more introspective and adult style. With grunge dominating the airwaves, her label waning, and it being bought out by the Chrysalis Group, Steele took her cue, and decided to put the music business on the back burner for a while. As an avid environmentalist, she worked a term for Greenpeace in Vancouver – eventually returning to University in Victoria. She performed a few isolated concert dates with a new all-female backing band in Quebec City and Montreal in 1994, and sang guest vocals on Feehan's 1996 album Pray for Rain but, by 1997 onwards, she was working as a graphic designer and communications professional in Victoria, B.C.

=== 2000s ===
As of 2022, Steele is working on new songs with Harlequin's original writer and guitarist Glen Willows, and her brother Bryan Southern.

Her first single "Insidious" was released on all the major streaming platforms on October 15, 2021.

== Discography ==
=== Studio albums ===
- Magnet to Steele (1991)

=== Singles ===
Love you 'Til it Hurts (1991)

Love Don't Last Forever (1991)

Insidious (2021)
