= Chilliwack (1971 album) =

Studio album by Chilliwack
- Released: September 1971
- Recorded: 1970
- Studios: Wally Heider Studios, San Francisco
- Genres: Rock, experimental, jazz rock, progressive rock, psychedelic rock, country rock
- Length: 70:58
- Labels: A&M; Pacemaker (2009 Reissue)
- Producers: Chilliwack & Stephen Barncard

Chilliwack chronology
Chilliwack (1970)	Chilliwack (1971)	All Over You (1972)

Chilliwack is a double album by the Canadian rock band Chilliwack, released in September 1971. It was their second album, and their second to be entitled Chilliwack. It included the top-10 (in Canada) hit "Lonesome Mary".

Following the release of their previous album, the band were dropped by Parrot Records and bassist Glenn Miller departed the group temporarily. Shortly thereafter, the group signed with A&M Records.

== Track listing ==
1. "Lonesome Mary" (Henderson) (2:59)
2. "Eat" (Henderson) (3:13)
3. "Rosie" (Lawrence, Henderson) (5:00)
4. "Ridin'" (Lawrence, Henderson) (3:00)
5. "Ride-Out" (Henderson) (4:51)
6. "Always" (Henderson) (2:22)
7. "Changing Reels" (Lawrence, Henderson) (13:38)
8. "Music for a Quiet Time" (Lawrence, Henderson)
  1. "Shine" (5:30)
  2. "Claps/Chants" (2:37)
  3. "Whistle/Flute Pads" (2:09)
  4. "Antiphony" (5:29)
  5. "Traveling Music" (0:53)
  6. "Sleep Music" (2:08)
9. "Night-Morning" (Lawrence, Henderson, Turney) (17:09)

== Personnel ==
Chilliwack

- Bill Henderson - guitar, piano, vocals
- Claire Lawrence - bass, organ, flute, saxophone, vocals
- Ross Turney - drums; organ on "Night-Morning"

Technical

- Chilliwack - arrangements, producer
- Stephen Barncard - engineer, producer
- Chuck Beeson - design
- Richard Bosworth - mixing assistant
- Ellen Burke - technician
- Roland Young - art direction
