= Riding High (Chilliwack album) =

Studio album by Chilliwack
- Released: April 1974
- Studio: Can-Base Studio, Vancouver
- Genre: Rock
- Length: 35:30
- Label: Goldfish Records (CAN); Sire Records (US); Philips Records (HOL); Phonogram Inc. (GER); Pacemaker (2009 Reissue)
- Producer: Mike Flicker, Terry Jacks

Chilliwack chronology
| All Over You (1972) | Riding High (1974) | Rockerbox (1975) |

Alternate cover
- Chilliwack U.S. Sire Records cover

Riding High is the fourth album by the Canadian rock band Chilliwack, released in Canada in April 1974. It was the band's first album with new guitarist/keyboardist Howard Froese, and contained the top-10 (in Canada) hit "Crazy Talk", which was co-produced by Terry Jacks of Poppy Family fame. In Canada, the album was released on Jacks' label Goldfish Records; in the U.S., it was not released until 1975 on Sire Records, where it was retitled Chilliwack (their third U.S. release to bear that title).

== Track listing ==
1. "Come On Over" (Turney, Henderson) (4:35)
2. "Crazy Talk" (Henderson) (5:25)
3. "There's Something I Like About That" (Turney, Henderson) (2:50)
4. "Makin' Time" (Turney, Henderson) (5:40)
5. "Riding High" (Turney, Henderson) (5:30)
6. "Time Don't Mean a Thing to Ya" (Henderson) (3:00)
7. "Far Side of the Sun (Suite)" (Turney, Henderson, Miller, Froese) (8:30)
  1. "Far Side Of The Sun"
  2. "Secrets"
  3. "Drifting"

== Singles ==
- "There Is Something I Like About That" (Turney, Henderson) (2:28)
  - Single Remix
  - Mono
  - Goldfish single GS 105
- "Crazy Talk" (Henderson) (2:51)
  - Single Remix
  - Mono
  - Goldfish single GS 110
- "In and Out" (Turney, Henderson, Miller, Froese) (2:39)
  - B-Side of "Crazy Talk" and "There Is Something I Like About That" 7" Singles
  - Mono
  - Produced by Terry Jacks for Poppy Family prod.
- "Come On Over" (Turney, Henderson) (3:12)
  - Single Remix
  - Stereo
  - Goldfish single GS 114
- "Riding High" (Turney, Henderson) (3:09)
  - Single Remix
  - Mono / Stereo
  - Produced by Craig Leon
  - Casino single C7 110
  - Promotional release issued after the Rockerbox album.

== Personnel ==
Chilliwack

- Bill Henderson - guitar, synthesizer, lead vocals
- Glenn Miller - bass
- Ross Turney - drums, percussion
- Howard Froese - guitar, keyboards, harmony vocals

== Production ==
- Mike Flicker (Tracks 1,4,5,6,7)
- Terry Jacks (Tracks 2 & 3)
- Engineers: Mike Flicker and Rolf Hennemann
- Mastering: Robert Ludwig, Sterling Sound, New York
- Management: Jim Herringer, Unity Artist Management, Inc., Vancouver
