= Rockerbox =

Studio album by Chilliwack
- Released: December 1975
- Genre: Rock
- Length: 32:57
- Labels: Sire Records (US); Casino Records (CAN); Philips Records (HOL); Phonogram Inc. (GER)
- Producers: Craig Leon, Richard Gottehrer

Chilliwack chronology
Riding High (1974)	Rockerbox (1975)	Dreams, Dreams, Dreams (1977)

Alternative cover
- Rockerbox Canada Casino Records cover

Rockerbox is the fifth album by the Canadian rock band Chilliwack, released in December 1975. The album was released by Sire Records in the US (Sire 7511), who had previously released the US version of Chilliwack's prior album, Riding High. In Canada, Rockerbox was released with a different cover by Casino Records (successors-in-interest to Chilliwack's previous Canadian label, Goldfish Records) and was Chilliwack's least successful album there. The album was produced by Sire Records' staff producers Craig Leon and Richard Gottehrer, who were better known for rock productions; as a result, it has a reputation as Chilliwack's most straight-ahead "rock" album.

As of 2022, this is the only Chilliwack album not to have been reissued in CD format.

== Track listing ==
1. "If You Want My Love" (Henderson, Turney) (5:45)
2. "I Know, You Know" (Henderson, Turney, Froese) (3:00)
3. "When You Gonna Tell the Truth" (Henderson, Turney, Miller) (3:23)
4. "Train's a Comin' Back" (Henderson, Turney, Miller) (3:08)
5. "Marianne" (Henderson, Turney) (6:44)
6. "Treat Me Fine, Treat Me Good" (Henderson, Turney) (3:40)
7. "Magnolia" (Henderson, Turney, Miller, Froese) (3:15)
8. "Last Day of December" (Henderson, Turney) (4:02)

== Personnel ==
Chilliwack

- Bill Henderson - guitar, vocals
- Glenn Miller - bass, vocals
- Ross Turney - drums, percussion
- Howard Froese - guitar, vocals

with:

- Bassett Hand - arranger and conductor on "If You Want My Love"
