= Reach for the Sky (Sutherland Brothers and Quiver album) =

Studio album by Sutherland Brothers and Quiver
- Released: 1975
- Studio: Morgan Studios, Willesden, London; CBS Studios, New Bond Street, London
- Genre: Soft rock
- Label: CBS, Columbia
- Producer: Howard Albert, Ron Albert

Sutherland Brothers and Quiver chronology
Beat of the Street (1974)	Reach for the Sky (1975)	Slipstream (1976)

Singles from Reach for the Sky
- 1. "Ain't Too Proud" Released: 1975; 2. "Arms of Mary" Released: 1975; 3. "When the Train Comes" Released: 1975

Reach for the Sky is an album by Sutherland Brothers and Quiver. It was released in 1975 on Columbia/CBS Records, and produced by Howard and Ron Albert. The album reached No. 26 on the UK Albums Chart in 1976. It contains the UK No. 5 and Ireland and Netherlands No. 1 hit single, "Arms of Mary".

== Track listing ==
Side one
No.	Title	Writer(s)	Length
1.	"When the Train Comes"	Iain Sutherland	4:00
2.	"Dirty City"	Iain Sutherland	3:35
3.	"Arms of Mary"	Iain Sutherland	2:37
4.	"Something Special"	Iain Sutherland	4:12
5.	"Love on the Moon"	Gavin Sutherland	4:15

Side two
No.	Title	Writer(s)	Length
1.	"Ain't Too Proud"	Gavin Sutherland	3:20
2.	"Dr. Dancer"	Gavin Sutherland	4:50
3.	"Reach for the Sky"	Gavin Sutherland, Iain Sutherland	3:22
4.	"Moonlight Lady"	Iain Sutherland	3:09
5.	"Mad Trail"	Iain Sutherland	3:54

== Personnel ==
- Iain Sutherland - rhythm guitar, vocals
- Gavin Sutherland - bass guitar, vocals; double bass on "Reach for the Sky"
- Tim Renwick - lead guitar
- Willie Wilson - drums; cardboard boxes on "Reach for the Sky"

with:

- D. J. Gilmour - pedal steel guitar on "Ain't Too Proud"
- Howard Albert - organ on "Dr. Dancer"
- Mike Lewis - string arrangement and conductor on "Moonlight Lady"

Technical

- Mike Ross-Trevor - engineer
- Alex Sadkin - mastering
- Rosław Szaybo - design, illustration

== Charts ==
Chart (1976)	Peak position
Australia (Kent Music Report)	31
United Kingdom (Official Charts Company)	26
