= Quiver (band) =

British rock band

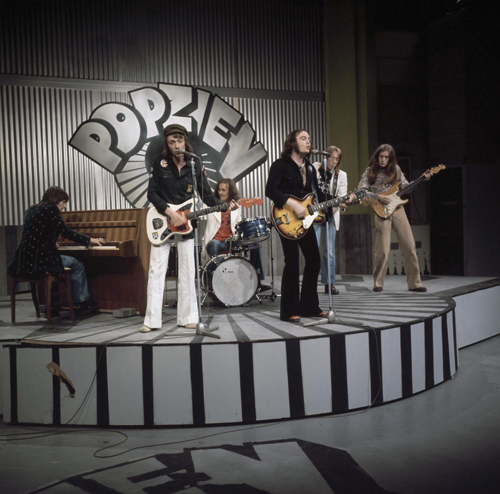
- Sutherland Brothers & Quiver on the Dutch television program Popzien, 8 June 1973

Background information
- Origin: England
- Genres: Progressive rock, soft rock
- Years active: 1970–1978
- Labels: Warner Bros., Island, CBS/Columbia
- Past members: Tim Renwick; Cal Batchelor; Bruce Thomas; John "Willie" Wilson; Peter Wood

Quiver were a British rock band formed in 1970 by Tim Renwick and Cal Batchelor. In December 1972, they teamed up with the Sutherland Brothers and became known as Sutherland Brothers & Quiver, releasing soft rock music and achieving success with the songs "(I Don't Want to Love You But) You Got Me Anyway" and "Arms of Mary", a No. 5 UK hit.

== History ==
Quiver was originally formed by guitarist Tim Renwick and bassist John 'Honk' Lodge (both formerly with Junior's Eyes and David Bowie), but soon comprised Tim Renwick, guitarist and singer Cal Batchelor, bassist Bruce Thomas and drummer Willie Wilson. Most of the members of Quiver are also featured on Al Stewart's albums Orange (1972) and Past, Present and Future (1973). In 1973, the Sutherland Brothers joined forces with them. It was with the brother duo that the band had most of their fame, including the songs "(I Don't Want to Love You But) You Got Me Anyway" and "Arms of Mary", the latter being a No. 5 UK hit in 1976. Batchelor left the band in 1973, after releasing a few songs with the Sutherland Brothers.

The Sutherland Brothers and Quiver's proper full-length debut was 1973's Dream Kid. Bruce Thomas, who had repeatedly been clashing with Iain Sutherland, then was asked to leave the group during a tour of Europe in March 1974. With only a week to go before the band was due to record their next album, Terry "Tex" Comer (of the band Ace) filled in on bass for live gigs and a few album cuts, but Gavin Sutherland quickly moved over from guitar to bass, and the band continued as a five-piece. Upon learning that Comer had been working with SB&Q behind his back, Ace frontman Paul Carrack wrote "How Long" in 1975. "How Long" became their biggest selling hit, reaching No. 3 on both the US and Canadian charts, and No. 20 on the UK Singles Chart. After their 1974 album Beat of the Street supplied no chart singles, Wood then left the group, and the remaining members left Island Records for CBS.

Quiver disbanded in 1978. Following this, the Sutherland Brothers continued for another year as the original duo they were, before also disbanding in 1979.

== Post-Quiver ==
- Quiver's Tim Renwick went on to play lead guitar with Al Stewart, and a later incarnation of Pink Floyd.
- Bassist Bruce Thomas likewise recorded with Al Stewart in 1972 to '73, and subsequently joined Elvis Costello and the Attractions.
- Peter Wood (a.k.a. Peter Woods) contributed keyboards to Al Stewart's albums from 1972 to '78, later worked with Cyndi Lauper, and also worked with Pink Floyd during their 1980 and 1981 shows for The Wall. Born Peter John Wood, 9 April 1950 in Middlesex, England, he died in December 1993 in New York City.
- Drummer Willie Wilson (born 8 July 1947, Cambridge, Cambridgeshire) recorded with Al Stewart in 1972 to '73, and also worked with Pink Floyd during the period (1980–'81) when the band were touring during The Wall Tour, and played drums on David Gilmour's first solo album.

== Discography ==
=== Albums ===
As Quiver

- Quiver (1971), Warner Bros.
- Gone in the Morning (1972), Warner Bros.

As Sutherland Brothers & Quiver

Year	Album	Label	UK
1973	Lifeboat	Island	—
1973	Dream Kid	Island	—
1974	Beat of the Street	Island	—
1975	Reach for the Sky	CBS	26
1976	Slipstream	CBS	49
1977	Down to Earth	CBS	—
"—" denotes releases that did not chart.

=== Compilation albums ===
- Sailing (1976), Island
- The Best of the Sutherland Brothers & Quiver (1976), Island
- The Very Best of the Sutherland Brothers & Quiver (2002), Columbia
- The Albums (8 CD box set) (2019), Lemon Recordings

=== Singles ===
As Quiver

- "Green Tree" (1972), Warner Bros.

As Sutherland Brothers & Quiver

Year	Title	Peak chart positions			
Year	Title	US Pop	US CB	CAN	UK
1973	"(I Don't Want to Love You But) You Got Me Anyway"	48	20	25	―
1974	"Dream Kid"	―	―	―	―
1974	"Saviour in the Rain"	―	―	―	―
1975	"Ain't Too Proud"	―	―	―	―
1976	"Arms of Mary"	81	―	―	5
1976	"Secrets"	―	―	―	35
1977	"If I Could Have Your Loving"	―	―	―	―
1977	"Ice in the Fire"	―	―	―	―
1977	"Every Tear I Cry"	―	―	―	―
"—" denotes releases that did not chart or were not released in that territory.
