= Bill Henderson (Canadian singer) =

Canadian singer, songwriter and producer (born 1944)

Bill Henderson CM
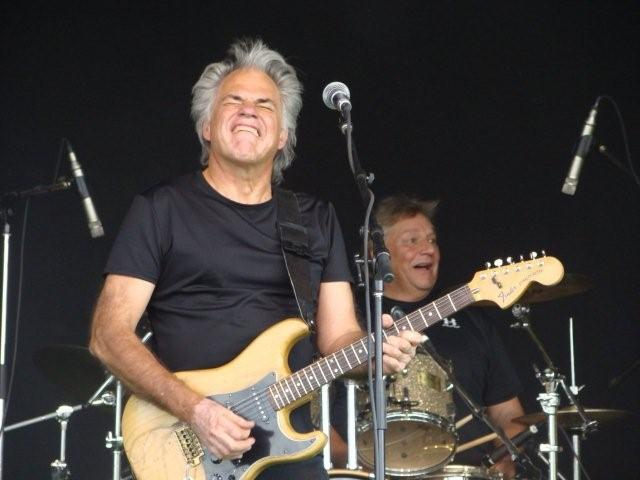

Background information
- Born: William Allen Henderson; November 6, 1944 (age 81); Vancouver, British Columbia, Canada
- Genre: Rock
- Occupations: Singer; songwriter; music producer
- Instruments: Vocals; guitar
- Years active: 1966–present
- Labels: Solid Gold; CBS (formerly)
- Website: www.gonegonegone.com

William Allen Henderson CM (born November 6, 1944) is a Canadian singer, songwriter, and music producer. Henderson is best known for his work as lead singer and guitarist with the group Chilliwack in the 1970s and 1980s.

== Career ==
As a young man, Henderson performed as a guitarist in the Panorama Trio at the Vancouver Hilton Hotel's Panorama Roof restaurant. He then helped form the psychedelic rock group The Collectors.

After The Collectors disbanded, Henderson and other former Collectors formed the band Chilliwack. The group played together for more than 30 years, and produced the hits "Lonesome Mary", "California Girl", and "My Girl (Gone, Gone, Gone)". He is also part of the folk music supergroup UHF.

Henderson is also a music producer. He was musical director for the Canadian edition of Sesame Street from 1989 to 1995. He has served as director of the Canadian Academy of Recording Arts and Sciences (CARAS) and as president of the Songwriters Association of Canada. In 2014 he was awarded the Special Achievement Award by Society of Composers, Authors and Music Publishers of Canada (SOCAN) at the 2014 SOCAN Awards in Toronto.

Henderson has continued to tour Canada both as a solo musician and with Chilliwack.

== Honors and awards ==
He and Brian MacLeod won the Producer of the Year Juno Award in 1983 for Chilliwack's Opus X album. He won a Genie Award for best original song in a movie ("When I Sing", from Bye Bye Blues). Henderson was a inaugural inductee to the BC Entertainment Hall of Fame in 1994.

Henderson was named a Member of the Order of Canada in 2015.

== Personal ==
Henderson's daughter Camille Henderson is a singer; she was a member in the early 1990s of the pop trio West End Girls, and has appeared as a guest vocalist on albums by Sarah McLachlan and Delerium. Another daughter, Saffron Henderson, is a singer, actress and voice actress. His son-in-law (Saffron's husband) is professional baseball player Chris Pritchett.

== Discography ==
=== The Collectors ===
- 1967 – The Collectors
- 1968 – Grass & Wild Strawberries

=== Chilliwack ===
- 1970 – Chilliwack
- 1971 – Chilliwack
- 1972 – All Over You
- 1974 – Riding High
- 1975 – Rockerbox
- 1977 – Dreams, Dreams, Dreams
- 1978 – Lights from the Valley
- 1980 – Breakdown in Paradise
- 1981 – Wanna Be a Star
- 1982 – Opus X
- 1983 – Segue (compilation)
- 1984 – Look In Look Out
- 1994 – Greatest Hits (compilation)
- 2003 – There and Back - Live

=== UHF ===
- 1990 – UHF
- 1994 – UHF II
