= The Collectors (album) =

Studio album by The Collectors (Chilliwack)
- Released: 1968
- Studio: American Recording Company, North Hollywood, CA
- Genre: psychedelic rock, psychedelic pop
- Length: 38:40
- Label: Warner Brothers/New Syndrome WS1746
- Producer: Dave Hassinger

The Collectors (Chilliwack) chronology
The Collectors (1968)	Grass & Wild Strawberries (1969)

The Collectors is the debut studio album by Canadian rock band the Collectors, released in 1968.

== Track listing ==
All songs by The Collectors except "Lydia Purple" by Don Dunn and Tony McCashen.

=== Side One ===
1. "What is Love?" (3:51)
2. "She (Will-O-the-Wind)" (3:51)
3. "Howard Christman’s Older" (5:08)
4. "Lydia Purple" (2:47) (#55 CAN)
5. "One Act Play" (3:42)

=== Side Two ===
1. "What Love (Suite)" (19:06)

== Musicians ==
The Collectors

- Howie Vickers - lead vocals
- Bill Henderson - guitar, recorder, backing vocals
- Claire Lawrence - tenor saxophone, organ, flute, recorder, backing vocals
- Glenn Miller - bass, backing vocals
- Ross Turney - drums, percussion

Additional musicians

- Larry Knechtel - piano and harpsichord on "Lydia Purple"
- Norm Jeffries - vibraphone on "Lydia Purple"
- Jesse Ehrlich - cello on "Lydia Purple"
