= Ernie and the Emperors =

American rock band

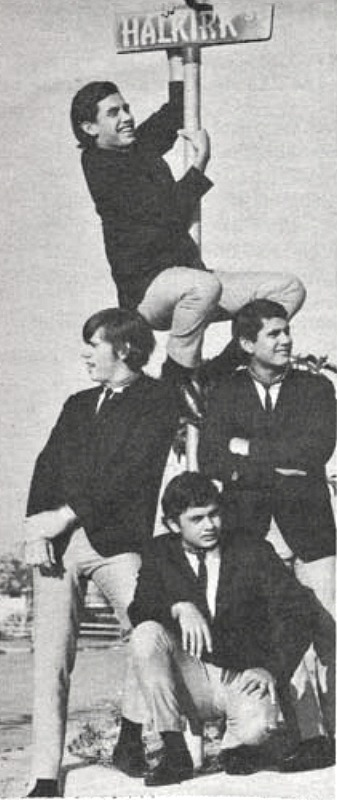
- Circa 1965

Background information
- Also known as: The Giant Crab; Big Brother Ernie Joseph Faith the Brian Faith Band
- Origin: Santa Barbara, California, USA
- Genres: Rock, pop, psychedelic rock, garage rock
- Years active: 1963–present
- Labels: Reprise Records, UNI Records, All-American, SRS Hit Records Network
- Members: Ernie Orosco (Ernie Joseph); Ray Orosco (Cory Orosco) "Ruben the Jet" Orosco (Brian Faith); Randy Busby
- Website: ernieandtheemperors.blogspot.com

Ernie and the Emperors were a rock band from Santa Barbara, California. They were an example of 1960s rock and pop, influenced by the British Invasion with songs that employed rich harmonies, instrumental hooks, and upbeat lyrics. Their biggest hit was their single "Meet Me At The Corner", a hit for them as Ernie and the Emperors. In later years, they also released materials as The Giant Crab, as Big Brother Ernie Joseph, Faith and as the Brian Faith Band.

== History ==
Ernie and The Emperors started their career as the opening act for the Isley Brothers at the Earl Warren Showgrounds in Santa Barbara. Soon after, having won numerous Battle of the Bands competitions, they were made the official house band for the venue. After signing a deal with Reprise Records in 1965, they enjoyed a hit, "Meet Me At The Corner" in the California Gold Coast locale of Santa Barbara, Ventura and San Luis Obispo counties. The Emperors carried out a performance schedule that took them all over the country. When bass man Randy Busby left, Denny and Kenny Fricia stepped in and the band changed their name to the Giant Crab. As each of the members were drafted into the military the band changed, but upon returning they re-reformed, releasing a string of singles and two LPs. In 1968 Greg Munford, lead vocalist in the Strawberry Alarm Clock hit, Incense and Peppermints, also joined the Giant Crab as a studio artist and performed with the band in Wolfman Jack's California College Tour. Later, Greg Munford also performed in the Southeast Tour with the band.

In 1969 Ernie Joseph changed his musical direction with the driving rock Confusion album, teaming up with brothers "Ruben the Jet" (Brian Faith), Cory (Cory Colt), and drummer Steve Dunwoodie (Stevie D), to tour the southeastern states as Big Brother Ernie Joseph, a tour that included the Love Valley Music Festival near Greensboro, NC). While on tour they performed with the Allman Brothers Band, Bruce Springsteen & Steel Mill, members of the Marshall Tucker Band, Lynyrd Skynyrd, and Greg Munford and Ed King of the Strawberry Alarm Clock.

The brothers continued to perform as Big Brother Ernie Joseph, Faith, and currently as the Brian Faith Band, producing CDs and videos not only of themselves, but many noted artists. They have worked with such notables as Ritchie Blackmore (Deep Purple, Rainbow, and Blackmore's Night), Tim Bogert (Vanilla Fudge), Eddie Brigati (the Young Rascals), Cornelius Bumpus (the Doobie Brothers), Kenny Cetera (Chicago), Burleigh Drummond (Ambrosia), Bobby Harris (the Drifters), Doug Ingle (Iron Butterfly), Christian Love (son of Mike love of The Beach Boys), Steve Lukather (Toto), Peter Noone (Herman's Hermits), Roy Orbison, Katy Perry, Rare Earth, Jamie Shane (Canned Heat), Floyd Sneed (Three Dog Night), Nick St. Nicholas (Steppenwolf), Toad the Wet Sprocket, Hubert Tubbs (Tower of Power), Chuck Wild (Missing Persons), and many more.

Currently, the Orosco brothers are the subject of a documentary entitled Makin' It

== Band members ==
- Ernie Orosco (Ernie Joseph)
- Ray Orosco (Cory Orosco)
- "Ruben the Jet" Orosco (Brian Faith)
- Randy Busby

== Discography ==
- Meet Me At The Corner/Got A Lot I Want To Say (Reprise Records 45, 1965)
- Listen Girl/Soft Summer Breezes (Corby Records 45, 1967)
- Thru the Fields/Shimmy Like Kate (UNI 45, 1967)
- Day By Day (It Happens) /Kind of Funny (UNI 45, 1967)
- A Giant Crab Comes Forth (UNI LP, 1968)
- Believe It or Not/Lydia Purple (UNI 45, 1968)
- Hi Ho Silver Lining/Hot Line Conversation (UNI 45, 1968)
- Cool It/Intensify My Soul (UNI 45, 1968)
- Hot Line Conversation/E.S.P. (Uni 45, 1969)
- It Started With a Kiss/The Answer is No (UNI 45, 1969)
- Cool It...Helios (UNI LP, 1969)
- Confusion (All-American LP, 1969)
- South East Tour (All-American LP, 1970)
- An All-American Emperor (Akarma LP, 1968 - not released until 1999)
