= Headpins =

Canadian rock band

- Origin: Vancouver, British Columbia, Canada
- Genre: Hard rock
- Years active: 1979–present
- Labels: Solid Gold, MCA
- Members: Kat Lawrence; Ab Bryant; Bernie Aubin; Tony Dellacroce; Alfie Galpin
- Past members: Rosa Laricchiuta; Scott Reid; Darby Mills; Chrissy Steele; Denise McCann; Matt Frenette; Brian “Too Loud” MacLeod; Danny "Long Train" Latham; Darcy McDonald
- Website: http://www.headpins.net

Headpins are a Canadian rock band, founded as a side project in the late 1970s by then Chilliwack members Ab Bryant and Brian MacLeod. MacLeod was impressed by the vocal talents of Vancouver rock singer Denise McCann, and asked her to join his new venture. Originally, Matt Frenette played drums for the Headpins while Bernie Aubin played drums for a fellow Vancouver band, the soon to be renamed Loverboy. But within months, Aubin and Frenette swapped bands, where each continues to play to the present. The Headpins began gigging around the Vancouver area throughout 1981, quickly building a fan base. McCann left at the end of that first year, and MacLeod brought in Darby Mills to provide lead vocals.

== History ==
Headpins released their debut album Turn It Loud in 1982, which quickly went platinum and topped the charts for six weeks, with the hit single "Don't It Make Ya Feel". Darcy McDonald joined the band on keyboards in 1983. Their second release, Line of Fire, was another multi-platinum success, and included the hits "Just One More Time" and "Feel It (Feel My Body)", resulting in the band touring Europe with Whitesnake at the beginning of 1984. The group's sole entry on the US charts, "Just One More Time", spent nine weeks on the Billboard Hot 100, peaking at number 70 in February 1984.

In 1985, Headpins toured with acts such as Kiss (1983), Eddie Money and ZZ Top. The band was in middle of recording their third album, Head Over Heels, when their record company went bankrupt. They were part of ZZ Top's Afterburner Tour and were slated to go down the eastern seaboard (of the US) with the band. ZZ Top didn't like the attention that the opening act was getting, and the Headpins were told not to do an encore number. As it turns out, MacLeod decided not to listen, and they were removed from the bill. In 1986, Mills was fired and started a solo project and was replaced by Chrissy Steele. Later, when it was discovered that Brian MacLeod had brain cancer, it was decided that the next Headpins album would be a Chrissy Steele album and signed with Chrysalis Records. She ended up having two hits, "Love You 'Til It Hurts" and the ballad "Love Don't Last Forever".

Headpins continue to perform live with Ab and Bernie from the classic 1980s line-up. It was announced in the second half of 2016 that long time lead singer Darby Mills had moved on to pursue solo endeavors and that their new lead vocalist is Katrina (Kat) Lawrence. Rosa Laricchiuta took over lead vocals in April 2022. Darby Mills' last performance with The Headpins was in August 2016.

== Band members ==
=== Current ===
- Kat Lawrence - vocals
- Ab Bryant – bass
- Bernie Aubin – drums
- Tony Dellacroce – guitars
- Alfie Galpin – guitars, keyboards

=== Former ===
- Brian MacLeod - guitars, backing vocals
- Denise McCann – first lead vocalist
- Matt Frenette – drums
- Darby Mills – second lead vocalist
- Scott Reid – guitars
- Chrissy Steele – third lead vocalist
- Danny W. Latham – bass
- John Dryden – bass
- Vic Nickiforek – guitars
- Mark Craney – drums
- Darcy McDonald – keyboards
- Jim Buckshon - bass
- Dave Reimer - bass
- Matteo Caratozzolo - keyboards
- John Stoltz - drums
- Rosa Laricchiuta – fifth lead vocalist

== Discography ==
=== Studio albums ===
- Turn It Loud (1982)
- Line of Fire (1983)
- Head Over Heels (1985)

=== Compilation albums ===
- Greatest Hits (1988)
- Anthology (1995)
- The Complete Greatest Hits (2002)
