= (I Don't Want to Love You But) You Got Me Anyway =

Single by Sutherland Brothers and Quiver

from the album Lifeboat
- B-side: "Rock and Roll Show"
- Released: 1973
- Recorded: 1972
- Length: 3:15
- Label: Island Records
- Songwriter: Iain Sutherland
- Producer: Muff Winwood

"(I Don't Want to Love You But) You Got Me Anyway" is a song written by Iain Sutherland and performed by Sutherland Brothers and Quiver. It was released as a single in 1973, and is from the 1973 album Lifeboat.

== Chart performance ==
"(I Don't Want to Love You But) You Got Me Anyway" reached No. 20 on the Cashbox pop chart, No. 48 on the Billboard Hot 100, and No. 25 in Canada (RPM 100). The song also peaked at No. 48 in Australia.

== Popular culture ==
The song is featured on volume 17 of the Rhino Entertainment compilation album, Have a Nice Day.
