= Roy Forbes =

Canadian folk music singer-songwriter

- Birth name: Roy Charles Forbes
- Born: February 13, 1953 (age 72); Dawson Creek, British Columbia, Canada
- Origin: Vancouver, British Columbia, Canada
- Genres: Folk
- Occupation: Singer-songwriter
- Years active: 1971–present
- Website: www.royforbes.ca

Roy Charles Forbes (born February 13, 1953) is a Canadian folk music singer-songwriter, whose music bears heavy influences from classic American genres of acoustic blues and traditional country. Forbes is known for his high soulful voice and percussive guitar playing.

== Early life and education ==
Forbes was born and grew up in Dawson Creek, British Columbia. He learned to play guitar at age 14, and had the childhood nickname, "Bim".

== Career ==
Forbes, calling himself "Bim," began his musical career in Vancouver in 1971 after winning a "Battle of the Bands" competition in Dawson Creek. Initially, he appeared as the opening act for such groups as Supertramp and Santana, but soon came to headline and sell out his own shows. His song "Can't Catch Me", from his first LP Kid Full of Dreams, was released as a single and hit the Top 10 in several major Canadian markets. His third LP "Thistles" was produced by Emitt Rhodes and featured Mac Cridlin, David Foster, Bob Glaub, Penny Nichols, Jeff Porcaro, Ron Tutt, Blue Williams and Jai Winding. Forbes has appeared as a headliner in most of Canada's major folk music festivals. In 1984, he toured in the US with fellow Canadian Ferron, with whom he performed a duet on the song "Proud Crowd/Pride Cried" for her album, Shadows on a Dime. In 1987, he began performing and recording as Roy Forbes.

He is also a member of the supergroup UHF, together with Shari Ulrich and Bill Henderson.

Songs written by Forbes have been recorded by Sylvia Tyson, Garnet Rogers, Valdy, and Susan Jacks.

Since 2006, Forbes has hosted a weekly radio program called "Roy's Record Room" on the CKUA Radio Network in Alberta. He previously hosted a program known as "Snap Crackle Pop" on CBC Radio across Canada from 1996 to 2009. Both programs feature songs taken from his extensive collection of vintage records.

== Discography ==
=== as Bim ===
- Kid Full of Dreams (1975) (#72 Canada)
- Raincheck on Misery (1976) (#59 Canada)
- Thistles (1978)
- Anything You Want (1982)
- New Songs for an Old Celebration with Connie Kaldor (1985)

=== as Roy Forbes ===
- Love Turns to Ice (1987)
- The Human Kind (1992)
- Almost Overnight (1995)
- Crazy Old Moon (1998)
- Some Tunes For That Mother Of Mine (2006)
- Strikin' Matches – LIVE! (2014)
- Edge of Blue (2020)

=== with UHF ===
- UHF (1990)
- UHF II (1994)
