= I Believe (Chilliwack song) =

Single by Chilliwack

from the album Wanna Be a Star
- B-side: "Living in Stereo"
- Released: January 1982
- Genre: Rock
- Label: Millennium Records
- Songwriters: Brian MacLeod, Bill Henderson
- Producers: Brian MacLeod, Bill Henderson

Chilliwack singles chronology
"My Girl (Gone, Gone, Gone)" (1981)	"I Believe" (1982)	"Whatcha Gonna Do" (1982)

Music video
- "I Believe" (1981 TV performance) on YouTube

"I Believe" is a song that was performed by the Canadian group Chilliwack. It was released on their 1981 album Wanna Be a Star.

In Canada, the song peaked at number 13 for two weeks. In the United States, it reached number 33 on the Billboard Hot 100 and number 29 on Cash Box.

In late 1981, the group performed "I Believe" on American Bandstand.

== Chart performance ==
=== Weekly charts ===
Chart (1982)	Peak position
Canada RPM Top Singles	13
US Billboard Hot 100	33
US Cash Box Top 100	29

=== Year-end charts ===
Chart (1982)	Rank
Canada	78
US (Joel Whitburn's Pop Annual)	191
