= Denise McCann =

American-Canadian singer-songwriter (born 1948)

Denise McCann (Bachman)
- Also known as: Denise Bachman
- Born: Denise Eliane Helene McCann; December 16, 1948 (age 77)
- Origin: United States
- Genres: Rock, Disco, Celtic
- Occupation: Singer-Songwriter
- Instruments: guitar, mandolin, hurdy-gurdy, percussion, piano, bass
- Years active: 1977-present
- Labels: Polydor Canada, Ltd., Butterfly/EMI Records USA, RCA Canada,

Denise McCann (born December 16, 1948, in Clinton, Iowa) is an American-Canadian singer-songwriter.

== Biography ==
Growing up in a musical family (her grandfather Albert Hews McCann, Sr. was a professional cornet player and singer in Shreveport, Louisiana), McCann was part of the McCann Family Orchestra that accompanied traveling vaudeville acts at the Shreveport theatre.

McCann's family moved to Castro Valley, California during her teen years. After graduating from high school in 1967, she moved to San Francisco's Haight-Ashbury region.

McCann became part of the hippie movement when she worked at the Magic Mountain Festival on Mount Tamalpais and then at the Monterey Pop Festival, where she befriended a nervous Jimi Hendrix just before his seminal performance. She appears in the D.A. Pennebaker documentary "Monterey Pop!"

McCann went on to become a folk singer and songwriter, appearing many times at famed San Francisco folk clubs such as The Holy City Zoo, The Drinking Gourd, and The Coffee Gallery, where she would play her distinctive Gibson J-50 guitar and sing her original songs.

McCann joined with Bob Smith and Roy Michaels of "Cat Mother & the All Night Newsboys" to form a new group called "Rich and Famous (and Denise)". The group only played a few gigs before going their separate ways.

After moving to Kitsilano, a neighbourhood of Vancouver, British Columbia, McCann became a fixture performing at local clubs such as Rohan’s Rockpile and The Commodore Ballroom.

In Vancouver, McCann teamed up with Guy Sobell, who produced her first single, the country-tinged "It Still Hurts" and its proposed B side "Tattoo Man". But her record label, Polydor Records in Montreal, decided the second song was too rock and roll oriented to serve as the B side to this country song, and they asked Sobell to extend it by adding a 2-minute percussion break in the middle so they could market it in the new clubs that were springing up all over Montreal. These clubs were playing a new genre of music that was called "Disco" for the discotheques where the beat-heavy dance music was popular and they wanted long, extended pieces that could be mixed by the club DJs to make them seamlessly meld into one another. Sobell complied with the request and "Tattoo Man" was released as a five-minute extended play LP that became a hit on the disco charts across North America.

McCann's follow-up record was "I Don't Wanna Forget You", a song that featured a four-octave vocal improvisation. This second release received more commercial radio exposure than "Tattoo Man".

McCann was signed to the ill-fated and short-lived Disco specialty label "Butterfly Records" in Hollywood, and was thereafter dogged by having her record label go out of business twice just as her albums ("Midnight Madness" and "I Have A Destiny") were released.

She continued to work professionally in Canada in many bands, including the Basil Watson Revue, Mad Ivan and the Hornets, Denise McCann Band, Denise McCann and the Dead Marines, Headpins, and The Night Train Revue. She also appeared as a featured performer on many Canadian TV shows, including The Alan Hamel Show and its replacement The Alan Thicke Show, the Wolfman Jack Show, The Paul Anka Show, and the Rene Simard Show. She performed at the famed Studio 54 nightclub in 1982.

McCann met Randy Bachman of The Guess Who and Bachman–Turner Overdrive at a Christmas fundraiser concert and they married in 1982. She became a Canadian citizen in 1989.

Bachman and McCann separated in 2011. Prior to their separation, McCann was heard on CBC Radio as a contributor to Bachman's program Vinyl Tap.
