= The Sutherland Brothers =

Scottish folk and soft rock duo

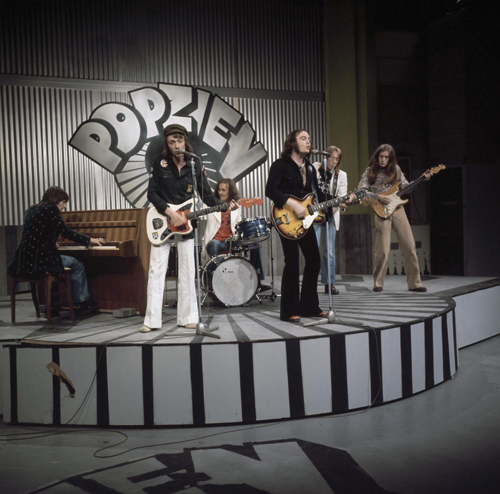
- Sutherland Brothers & Quiver on the Dutch television program Popzien, 8 June 1973

Background information
- Origin: Aberdeenshire, Scotland
- Genres: Folk rock, soft rock
- Years active: 1968–1979
- Labels: Island Records, CBS Records
- Past members: Gavin Sutherland; Iain Sutherland

The Sutherland Brothers (Gavin and Iain Sutherland) were a Scottish folk and soft rock duo. From 1973 to 1978, they performed with rock band Quiver, and recorded and toured as Sutherland Brothers & Quiver. Under this combined moniker, the group recorded several albums and had an international hit single with the song "Arms of Mary" in 1976. In North America, their 1973 single "(I Don't Want to Love You But) You Got Me Anyway" reached No. 48 on the Billboard Hot 100, and No. 25 in Canada.

== Personal details ==
- Gavin Sutherland (born 6 October 1951 in Peterhead, Aberdeenshire, Scotland) – bassist and vocalist.
- Iain George Sutherland (born 17 November 1948 in Ellon, Aberdeenshire, Scotland, died 25 November 2019, Wollerton, Shropshire, England) – vocalist, guitarist and keyboards.

Iain George Sutherland was born on 17 November 1948 in Ellon, Aberdeenshire. Younger brother Gavin was born on 6 October 1951 in Peterhead. Their father was a civil servant in the local employment office, and played violin and accordion in a dance band called "The Melody Makers"; he was said to have a large collection of jazz records, and was inspired by French violinist Stéphane Grappelli. According to Gavin, most of their ancestors worked in the fishing industry. Gavin received his first guitar on his tenth birthday in 1961. In the 1960s, the family moved to the English Midlands.

Gavin first listened to rock and roll after listening to records owned by his friend's older brother. He was first inspired by The Shadows and according to him, whenever Cliff Richard and The Shadows were on television, he was always focused on Hank Marvin. Through this band, he learned how to play his first song on guitar, the Shadows' instrumental F.B.I.; Gavin later met his hero through mutual friend Bruce Welch, rhythm guitarist for the Shadows. The brothers both decided they wanted to be musicians in 1964, while on holiday at the Isle of Man, where they saw a poster for a "beat group competition", featuring five groups from Liverpool.

Iain died on 25 November 2019, aged 71.

== Career ==
The Sutherland Brothers began their career in 1968 as A New Generation, having some success with the single "Smokie Blues Away" (which used a melody based on the second movement of Dvořák's New World Symphony), backed with "She's a Soldier Boy" on Spark. Subsequently with the Sutherland Brothers Band (featuring bassist Kim Ludman and drummer Neil Hopwood), they won a new recording contract with Island Records and put out an album in 1972. Their first single as the Sutherland Brothers Band was under this contract and was a minor hit, "The Pie", in January 1972. Their follow-up single was "Sailing", which had much radio play but was commercially unsuccessful. (It was later a number one hit in the United Kingdom when covered by Rod Stewart).

Their second album Lifeboat was billed simply as Sutherland Brothers, and was recorded with different backing musicians. They released another two singles in 1972 (one as the Sutherland Brothers Band, one as Sutherland Brothers), then in early 1973, in an effort to diversify and expand their folk-based sound, the Sutherland Brothers joined forces with a local rock band known as Quiver. Quiver was originally formed by guitarist Tim Renwick and bassist John 'Honk' Lodge (both formerly with Junior's Eyes and David Bowie), but soon comprised Tim Renwick, guitarist and singer Cal Batchelor, bassist Bruce Thomas and drummer Willie Wilson. Most of the members of Quiver are also featured on Al Stewart's albums Orange (1972) and Past, Present and Future (1973).

=== The Sutherland Brothers and Quiver (1973–1978) ===
The Sutherland Brothers' greatest success came through their collaboration with Quiver, whereby releases were credited to the "Sutherland Brothers and Quiver". The amalgamated group's first single, 1973's "(I Don't Want to Love You But) You Got Me Anyway", was a minor success in North America, reaching number 48 on the Billboard Hot 100 in the US, N. 20 on the Cashbox pop charts and peaking at number 25 in Canada. After the release of this single, and after only a few gigs with the band, Batchelor (who had been Quiver's primary songwriter) left. After a few more shows as a five-piece, Batchelor was replaced by keyboardist Peter Wood. The six-piece group then recorded three other tracks that were included in a heavily-revised North American issue of Lifeboat. In the US and Canada, Lifeboat was credited to the Sutherland Brothers and Quiver, although Quiver did not play on the majority of the album's tracks.

The Sutherland Brothers and Quiver's proper full-length debut was 1973's Dream Kid. Bruce Thomas, who had repeatedly been clashing with Iain Sutherland, then was asked to leave the group during a tour of Europe in March 1974. With only a week to go before the band was due to record their next album, Tex Comer filled in on bass for live gigs and a few album cuts, but Gavin Sutherland quickly moved over from guitar to bass, and the band continued as a five-piece.

After their 1974 album Beat of the Street supplied no chart singles, Wood then left the group, and the remaining members left Island Records for CBS.

The September 1975 album release Reach for the Sky marked the debut of the Sutherland Brothers and Quiver on CBS Records. Their first CBS single, "Ain't Too Proud" (1975; featuring David Gilmour of Pink Floyd on pedal steel guitar) did not chart, but the second CBS single, "Arms of Mary" charted in April 1976, becoming a UK top ten hit single. "Arms of Mary" was also an international success most notably in Ireland and the Netherlands – in which territories the track was number 1 for respectively four and three weeks – with the track also reaching number 1 on Belgium's Flemish charts. The track "When the Train Comes" was also released as a single.

The Sutherland Brothers and Quiver achieved one further UK chart success, "Secrets", in November 1976, from their next album Slipstream. Guitarist Renwick left the group in 1977 and was not replaced; guitarist Robert Wood from the Murky Joe Band was scheduled to join the band on tour but family ties prevented it, this left drummer Willie Wilson as the only remaining member of Quiver. The Sutherland Brothers and Quiver recorded one final album in 1977, Down to Earth with a wide array of guest musicians helping out, including Renwick, Andy Pyle from the Kinks, Rick Wills of the Small Faces, Brian Bennett from the Shadows and ex-Moon drummer John Shearer on percussion. It failed to chart, nor spin off any hit singles.

=== Back to being a duo (1979) ===
The Sutherland Brothers parted company with Quiver (i.e., Wilson) by 1979, but continued to release material as the Sutherland Brothers for a time. In this period, they achieved one further chart success with "Easy Come Easy Go", in June 1979. However, they disbanded late in 1979 after recording a final album When the Night Comes Down on CBS, with the final single being "First Love" / "Crazy Town".

== Discography ==
=== Albums ===
| Year | Album | Peak chart positions | | | Label |
| Year | Album | UK | AUS | US | Label |
|---|---|---|---|---|---|
| 1972 | The Sutherland Bros' Band | — | 35 | — | Island |
| 1972 | Lifeboat | — | 37 | 77 | Island |
| 1973 | Dream Kid | — | — | 193 | Island |
| 1974 | Beat of the Street | — | — | — | Island |
| 1975 | Reach for the Sky | 26 | — | 195 | CBS/Columbia |
| 1976 | Slipstream | 49 | — | — | CBS/Columbia |
| 1977 | Down to Earth | — | — | — | CBS/Columbia |
| 1979 | When the Night Comes Down (Note: Only album as a duo, recorded in Los Angeles.) | — | — | — | CBS/Columbia |
"—" denotes releases that did not chart.

=== Gavin Sutherland solo albums ===
- Diamonds and Gold (1999)
- The Deal (2008)
- Tango at the Lost Cafe (2013)

=== Singles ===
| Year | Title | Peak chart positions | | | | | | | | |
| Year | Title | UK | AUS | BEL | CAN | IRE | NLD | NZ | US Pop | US CB |
|---|---|---|---|---|---|---|---|---|---|---|
| 1972 | "The Pie" (credited as the Sutherland Bros. Band) | ― | 34 | ― | ― | ― | ― | ― | ― | ― |
| 1972 | "Sailing" (credited as the Sutherland Bros. Band) | 54 (Note: Chart position is from the official UK "Breakers List".) | ― | ― | ― | ― | ― | ― | ― | ― |
| 1972 | "Lady Like You" | ― | ― | ― | ― | ― | ― | ― | ― | ― |
| 1973 | "(I Don't Want to Love You But) You Got Me Anyway" (with Quiver) | ― | 48 | ― | 25 | ― | ― | ― | 48 | 20 |
| 1974 | "Saviour in the Rain" (with Quiver) | ― | ― | ― | ― | ― | ― | ― | ― | ― |
| 1974 | "Dream Kid" (with Quiver) | 57 | ― | ― | ― | ― | ― | ― | ― | ― |
| 1975 | "When the Train Comes" | 55 | ― | ― | ― | ― | ― | ― | ― | ― |
| 1975 | "Ain't Too Proud" (with Quiver) | ― | ― | ― | ― | ― | ― | ― | ― | ― |
| 1976 | "Arms of Mary" (with Quiver) | 5 | 28 | 1 | ― | 1 | 1 | 32 | 81 | 71 |
| 1976 | "Secrets" (with Quiver) | 35 | ― | ― | ― | ― | ― | ― | ― | 97 |
| 1977 | "If I Could Have Your Loving" (with Quiver) | ― | ― | ― | ― | ― | ― | ― | ― | ― |
| 1977 | "Ice in the Fire" (with Quiver) | ― | ― | ― | ― | ― | ― | ― | ― | ― |
| 1977 | "Every Tear I Cry" (with Quiver) | ― | ― | ― | ― | ― | ― | ― | ― | ― |
| 1978 | "One More Night with You" | ― | ― | ― | ― | ― | ― | ― | ― | ― |
| 1978 | "Somebody's Fool" | ― | ― | ― | ― | ― | ― | ― | ― | ― |
| 1979 | "Easy Come Easy Go" | 50 | ― | ― | ― | ― | ― | ― | ― | ― |
| 1979 | "As Long as I've Got You" | ― | ― | ― | ― | ― | ― | ― | ― | ― |
| 1979 | "First Love" | ― | ― | ― | ― | ― | ― | ― | ― | ― |
"—" denotes releases that did not chart or were not released in that territory.
