= My Girl (Gone, Gone, Gone) =

Single by Chilliwack

from the album Wanna Be a Star
- B-side: "Sign Here"
- Released: September 1981
- Genre: Rock
- Length: 3:56
- Label: Millennium
- Songwriters: Brian MacLeod, Bill Henderson
- Producers: Brian MacLeod, Bill Henderson

Chilliwack singles chronology
"Secrets" (1978)	"My Girl (Gone, Gone, Gone)" (1981)	"I Believe" (1982)

"My Girl (Gone, Gone, Gone)" is a song that was performed by the Canadian group Chilliwack. Co-written by bandmembers Brian MacLeod and Bill Henderson, it was released on the band's 1981 album Wanna Be a Star.

In Canada, the song spent four weeks at number 3. In the United States, it reached number 22 on the Billboard Hot 100, their biggest hit on the US charts.

== Background ==
Guitarist Brian MacLeod invited singer Bill Henderson onto his boat to sail around the coast of British Columbia, fish, and write songs. MacLeod was playing some chord changes on a Fender Rhodes keyboard and singing the melody "down down down down down d-down". He thought it was a bad idea, "like the Beach Boys, but with a lot of weird chord changes going on." Henderson saw potential, and decided the words were "Gone gone gone she's been gone so long, she's been gone gone gone so long." From there, MacLeod came up with chords for verses and chorus, and Henderson came up with the melody and made up a story around a girl being gone so long. The song was written in a day, the demo was recorded on Henderson's 4-track cassette studio recorder, and he added the bridge and a cappella that night.

In the studio, the band was under contract with Mushroom Records. In the asset-selling confusion that followed the death of its owner, the label would not let Chilliwack record. Under a pseudonym, they snuck into the studio and recorded anyway, then shopped "My Girl" and other songs around. This got them a deal with Millennium Records in New York, breaking them into the mainstream after eleven years.

Brian MacLeod pressed his face so close to the microphone to sing the intro that he would saturate it with moisture, the microphone would cut out, and they would have to stop every five words or so to wait for it to dry.

== Reception ==
MacLeod and Henderson were nominated for the Juno Award for 1982 Composer of the Year, as well as Single of the Year for "My Girl (Gone, Gone, Gone).". In January 2019, the song became certified Platinum (in excess of 100,000 copies sold) as a single in Canada.

== Chart performance ==
=== Weekly charts ===
Chart (1981–1982)	Peak position
Australia (Kent Music Report)	57
Canada CBC Top Singles	1
Canada RPM Top Singles	3
US Billboard Hot 100	22
US Billboard Mainstream Rock	16
US Cash Box Top 100	19
US Radio & Records	15

=== Year-end charts ===
Chart (1981)	Rank
Canada	29
US (Joel Whitburn's Pop Annual)	133

Chart (1982)	Rank
Canada	67

== In popular culture ==
On the April 23, 1982 episode of the sketch comedy TV series SCTV during the skit "Pre-Teen World Telethon," the fictional adolescent garage band The Recess Monkeys, as performed by Stephan Seely (John Candy) on drums and backing vocals; Paul Rey (Eugene Levy) on guitar, backing vocals, and tambourine and Steve Applebaum (Rick Moranis) on guitar and lead vocals; do a very amateurish cover of the song.
