= Claire Lawrence =

Canadian musician

- Born: 1939 (age 86–87); Elk Point, Alberta, Canada
- Occupation: Musician
- Instruments: Keyboards, flute, saxophone, piano

Claire Lawrence (born 1939) is a Canadian musician who was a founding member of the Canadian band The Collectors, and remained with the group when it transitioned to Chilliwack in 1970. He performed on keyboards, flute, saxophone, and piano. He left Chilliwack in 1971 after several albums with the band and subsequently produced albums for a number of Canadian artists and groups including Ferron, Susan Jacks, Valdy, Shari Ulrich, Roy Forbes, 1979- (Nancy Nash with Robbie King CBC), UHF and Connie Kaldor.

== Early life ==
Lawrence was born in Elk Point, Alberta. At the age of thirteen he began performing on the saxophone with his father's jazz band in night clubs in Victoria, British Columbia. He attended the University of British Columbia.

== Career ==
While attending university in 1964, Lawrence started a band called The Classics. This group later became The Collectors. When that group changed its name to Chilliwack, Lawrence continued to perform with them for some time before leaving to concentrate on production work.

In the 1970s, he produced The Great Canadian Gold Rush for CBC Radio, hosted by Terry David Mulligan. In 1973 he released an album, Leaving You Free, on the Haida label, and toured with Valdy as part of the Hometown Band. In 1977, the Hometown Band, with Lawrence on saxophone and flute and as producer, released an album, The Hometown Band, with Shari Ulrich singing lead vocals.

In the early 1980s, he fronted the Claire Lawrence Band, which performed in western Canada. The band released a self-titled album in 1981.

In 1985, Lawrence produced the album Moonlight for Connie Kaldor, and performed with her in support of the album. From 1986 to 1990, he scored the music for the long-running CBC series, The Beachcombers. Between 1991 and 1994, he wrote the theme and incidental music for the CBC teen drama Northwood, shot in North and West Vancouver, British Columbia. In the late 1990s he wrote the theme music used in the first two seasons of the CTV series Cold Squad. From 2000 to 2006, he produced Jazz Beat for CBC Radio.
