= Brian MacLeod (Canadian musician) =

Brian Oliver MacLeod
- Born: June 25, 1952; Halifax, Nova Scotia, Canada
- Died: April 25, 1992 (aged 39) Vancouver, British Columbia, Canada
- Genres: Pop music
- Occupation: Musician
- Instruments: Guitar, Drums, Keyboards
- Formerly of: Chilliwack; Headpins

Brian Oliver MacLeod (June 25, 1952 – April 25, 1992), nicknamed "Too Loud" MacLeod, was a Canadian musician, songwriter and music producer, best known as a member of the bands Chilliwack and Headpins.

== History ==
Born in Halifax, Nova Scotia, MacLeod appeared as a guitarist in the Canadian band Pepper Tree and was a member of Huski and Garrison Hill with best friend Denny Driscoll in St. John's, Newfoundland. While in Garrison Hill, he met Pam Marsh, who was leaving the band Everyday People after a Newfoundland tour. Marsh and MacLeod recorded a demo in St. John's of some original tunes and went off to Toronto and formed the band "Surrender" with Paul "Boomer" Stamp on drums and Ken Morris on bass. In 1975, MacLeod released a solo single "You Know I Can't Do Anymore"/"Come By Chance". In 1978, while working the Ontario bar circuit with Stingaree (which included fellow guitarist Bernie LaBarge) he was invited to join Chilliwack and first appeared on their album Lights from the Valley. In addition to guitar, MacLeod occasionally contributed on vocals, drums, and keyboards—and he eventually co-produced the band's albums, notably Opus X (1982) for which he received a Best Producer Juno Award.

With bassist Ab Bryant, MacLeod initially formed Headpins as a side project to Chilliwack. After Opus X MacLeod left Chilliwack to focus his efforts on Headpins (featuring Denise McCann and eventually Darby Mills on vocals) released on Solid Gold Records in Canada and MCA Records in the United States. MacLeod produced other albums for such artists as Kick Axe, Pretty Rough, D.O.A., Paul Dean, Holly Woods (Toronto), Tim Feehan, and Chrissy Steele and shares songwriting credits with Bryan Adams, Loverboy, Chicago, Jermaine Jackson and Nancy Nash. MacLeod also joined friends Denny Driscoll, Rick Livingstone and Ross Damude as the drummer for their band Montana with their co-written song "Lorelei".

Living exclusively on his prized boat Grand Marnier (with full recording studio onboard) with his "first mate" a dog named Sailor, MacLeod was a fixture at both Coal Harbour and Granville Island Marinas in Vancouver. He was also often spotted driving his beloved red and white classic Corvette convertible. MacLeod was also in training for his small aircraft pilot licence.

In 1990, MacLeod collapsed onstage and was diagnosed with brain cancer with a tumour in his upper chest cavity which metastasized into bone cancer. After his death in Vancouver, British Columbia in 1992, several friends organised the Brian MacLeod Benefit Concerts which featured some of the best musicians on the Canadian music scene and continued through 1997.

== Discography ==
=== with Chilliwack ===
- Lights from the Valley (1978)
- Breakdown in Paradise (1979)
- Wanna Be a Star (1981)
- Opus X (1982)

=== with Headpins ===
- Turn It Loud (1982)
- Line of Fire (1983)
- Head Over Heals (1985)
