= UHF (Canadian band) =

UHF is a Canadian folk music supergroup, consisting of singer-songwriters Bill Henderson of Chilliwack fame, Shari Ulrich and Roy Forbes.

The group was formed in 1989 when Forbes and Ulrich were asked to perform with Henderson at the Vancouver Winter Roots Festival. The combination worked well, so that the three artists teamed up as UHF and produced an independent self-titled album. The trio reunited to release a second album in 1995.

Though the individual members are mostly occupied with solo careers and other projects, for many years they performed several concerts a year, including the Winnipeg Folk Festival in 1998.

== Albums ==
- 1990 – UHF
- 1994 – UHF II
