= Darby Mills =

Canadian singer (born 1959)

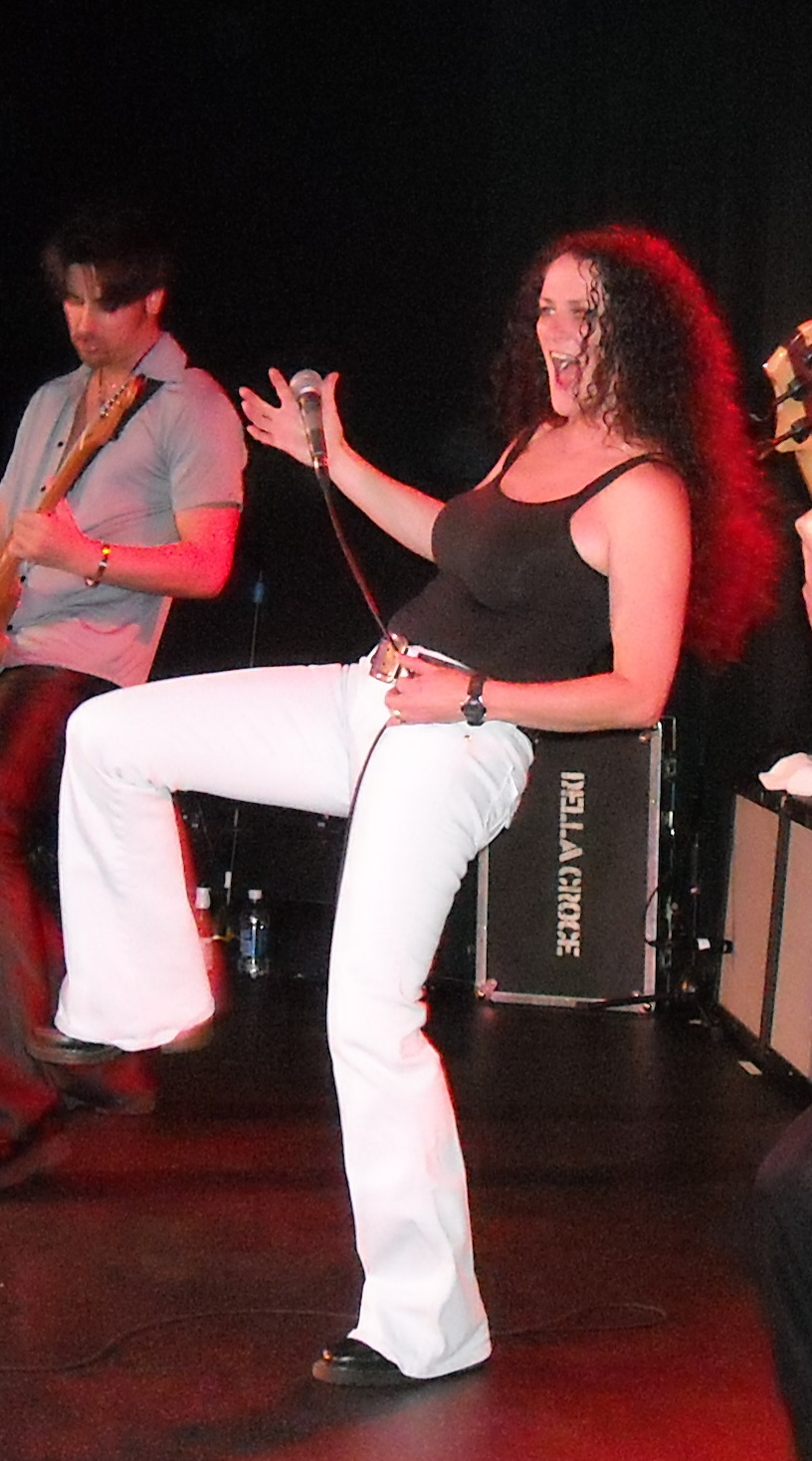
Mills and the Headpins in 2008

Darby Phyllis Mills is a Canadian rock vocalist, former figure skater, and the past lead singer of Headpins. She has embarked on a solo career, having signed a worldwide record contract and released both a remastered solo album and a live CD.

== History ==
Born in 1959 in Vernon, British Columbia, Mills began singing back-up vocals for Canadian bands in the late 1970s, most notably the British Columbia-based band Steelback.

After she joined Headpins in 1981, the group began a three-album run at the top of the Canadian charts. Their debut album "Turn It Loud" quickly went platinum and topped the charts for six weeks, spawning the hit single "Don't It Make Ya Feel". Their follow-up album "Line of Fire" produced the hits "Celebration" and "Just One More Time". Headpins toured Europe and North America opening for bands such as Kiss, Whitesnake, ZZ Top and Aerosmith, among others.

Mills released her debut solo LP Never Look Back backed by the Unsung Heroes.

She returned to re-form Headpins with Bernie Aubin and Ab Bryant a year or so after her solo debut, without guitarist Brian MacLeod. In 2005, Mills was nominated for a star on Canada's Walk of Fame.

Mills has been married to Brian Wadsworth since the mid 80s, and has 2 sons, Clayton and Parker. When not on tour, Mills teaches tae kwon do.

In 2025 she launched True Story, a "live documentary" tour in which she blends musical performance and storytelling about her career. She also appeared in the fifth season of Canada's Got Talent.
