= Mushroom Records (Canada) =

Canadian music label

- Founded: 1974
- Distributors: Arista Records, EMI Records, Festival Records
- Genre: Pop, rock
- Country of origin: Canada
- Location: Vancouver, British Columbia

Mushroom Records was a Canadian independent record label founded in Vancouver, British Columbia with financial backing by brothers Wink and Dick Vogel in 1974. The brothers were sons of businessman and politician Hunter Vogel. Shelly Siegel was the label's vice-president and creative director. Producer Mike Flicker also worked with the company. Mushroom released approximately 15 LP titles and 50 singles between 1974 and 1980.

== History ==
The Mushroom label initially released recordings in Canada through distribution arrangements with five independent distributors. In 1976 Jay Gold was named general manager of Mushroom Records in Canada and he negotiated a national distribution agreement with A&M Records Canada. Ian Warner was vice-president of international affairs and publishing.

The company was also incorporated in the United States and maintained a second office on Sunset Boulevard in Los Angeles, California. Mushroom was distributed in the U.S. through a network of independent distributors, which included Fourth Street East in Chatsworth, California. Some Mushroom recordings were also released abroad through Arista Records, EMI Records and Festival Records.

Mushroom released several successful albums from artists such as Doucette, Heart, and Chilliwack. Mushroom also had a short lived subsidiary, Chanterelle Records, which released records by disco musician Jim Grady.

Flicker left Mushroom during Heart's dispute with Siegel over Heart's second album. Siegel moved to the L.A. office, but suddenly died due to an aneurysm on 17 January 1979. In late 1980 Mushroom Records went out of business. The same year Gold left Mushroom to co-found Flicker Records with Mike Flicker.

Heart's two Mushroom albums were purchased and re-issued by Capitol Records when the band moved to that label in 1985. In late 2013 Linus Entertainment released several Mushroom recordings on CD for the first time including albums by Chilliwack and Doucette.

== Mushroom Studios ==
In 1946, Aragon Recording Studios was opened in Vancouver. By 1954, Al Reusch had acquired sole ownership. A studio was built by Aragon in 1966, and under a sponsorship deal, the new facility was initially named Can-Base Studios.

In the early 1970s Reusch sold the studio to Jack Herschorn, who appointed Mike Flicker as chief engineer and Howard Leese as program manager. Charlie Richmond also worked as head technical advisor. Flicker and Leese had earlier worked in Los Angeles studios and later became known for their production and arranging work with the Seattle band Heart.

Can-Base went bust and the studio acquired investment funds from the Vogel family. The name was changed to Mushroom Studios. In 1974 the Mushroom Records label was also established in Vancouver. Though the two remained separate business entities, many of Mushroom Records' albums were recorded at Mushroom studios. Mushroom Records went bust in 1980, but Mushroom Studios continued on.

In January 2006, the studio was purchased by Hipposonic Studios and renamed Hippowest Music Ltd. In 2011, the studio was moved 3,000 miles cross country, and relocated inside the Play-Dead Mansion on Queen Street West in Toronto, where it once again took its current name of Mushroom Studios.

== Partial list of artists recording with Mushroom Records (Canada) 1974-1980 ==
- Chilliwack
- Rick Dees
- Doucette
- Heart
- Susan Jacks
- Paul Horn
- Ian Matthews

== See also ==
- List of record labels
- Hipposonic Studios
- Barracuda – a song critical of the practices of Mushroom Records
