= The Collectors (Canadian band) =

Canadian psychedelic rock band

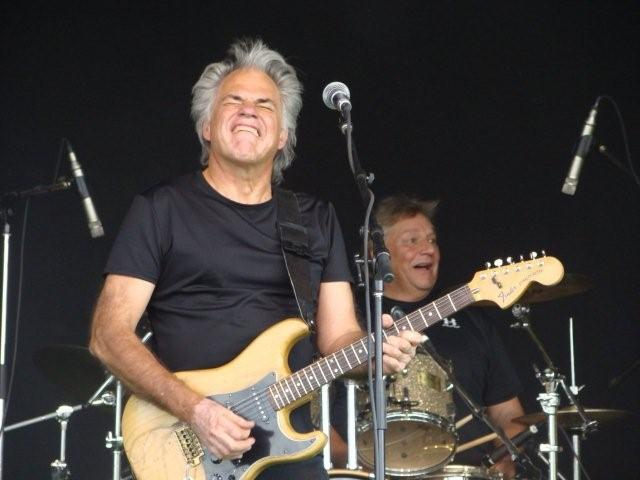
Collectors singer/guitarist Bill Henderson, who later became known for his work with Chilliwack.

The Collectors was a Canadian psychedelic rock band active in the 1960s.

== History ==
The Collectors debuted in Vancouver, British Columbia, in 1961 as a house band (the C-FUN Classics) for CFUN radio, and renamed itself The Collectors in 1966. The band featured Howie Vickers (Howard Vickberg) on lead vocals, Bill Henderson on lead guitar, recorder, keyboards, and lead vocals (these last mostly on Grass and Wild Strawberries), Claire Lawrence on tenor saxophone, harmonica, keyboards, flute, organ, recorder, and vocals, Glenn Miller on bass and vocals, and Ross Turney on drums and percussion.

The Collectors' biggest hit was their first single, "Looking at a Baby", released in March 1967 on the Valiant label in the U.S. and on New Syndrome in Canada. It reached number four on Toronto's CHUM-AM on April 24, 1967. Valiant was then acquired by Warner Bros. Records. In 1967, the group released its first album, The Collectors, on the Warner Bros.-Seven Arts label and appeared on sessions for the US group The Electric Prunes' album Mass in F Minor.

In the fall of 1968, they released Grass and Wild Strawberries. The lyrics of this album were written by Canadian poet and playwright George Ryga ("The Ecstasy of Rita Joe") complemented by the music of The Collectors. Between 1968 and 1969, the group composed soundtracks to three Canadian films: Don't Let The Angels Fall (1968), Canada The Land (1969), and The Land (1969). The Collectors also appeared on the CBC national television program Let's Go.

Howie Vickers left the group in 1969, and the remaining members of the band reconstituted themselves as Chilliwack, with Bill Henderson taking over lead vocals.

== Discography ==
=== Albums ===
- 1968 The Collectors
- 1969 Grass and Wild Strawberries

=== Singles ===
Year	Song	Parent album	CAN	CHUM	US Billboard	US Cash Box	US Main
1967	"Looking at a Baby" / "Old Man"	Non-album singles	23	4	—	—	—
1967	"Fisherwoman"	Non-album singles	18	—	—	—	—
1968	"We Can Make It"	Non-album singles	99	—	—	—	—
1968	"Lydia Purple"	The Collectors	55	—	—	—	—
1969	"Early Morning"	Grass and Wild Strawberries	84	—	—	—	—
1970	"I Must Have Been Blind"	Non-album singles	56	20	—	—	—
1970	"Sometimes We're Up"	Non-album singles	63	—	—	—	—
