= Linus Entertainment =

Canadian independent record label

Linus Entertainment is a music company operating as an independent record label, distributor and music publisher. While founded in Mississauga, Ontario, Linus spent many years in Burlington, Ontario before recently moving operations to Waterdown, Ontario a community within the city of Hamilton, Ontario, Canada.

In August 2023, Linus was acquired by Round Hill Music. At the time, Linus Entertainment's catalogue included releases by artists including Big Wreck, Bruce Cockburn, Buffy Sainte-Marie, Gordon Lightfoot, Stan Rogers, and Taj Mahal.

== Foundation ==
The company was founded in 2001 by President Geoff Kulawick, who previously served as head of A&R for Virgin Records/EMI Music Canada and as the creative head of Warner/Chappell Music Canada. Linus Entertainment's owned properties now include the labels Linus Entertainment, True North Records, Solid Gold Records, The Children’s Group, Divergent Recordings and Spring Hill Records, as well as the Independent Digital Licensing Agency a.k.a. IDLA Associated Label Distribution.

== Growth and acquisitions ==
Linus Entertainment has grown to acquire a controlling interest in global music distributor IDLA (Independent Digital Licensing Agency) in 2010, and in 2007 acquired Canada’s True North Records with partners Harvey Glatt and Michael Pilon. It was also in 2010 that Linus acquired The Children’s Group Inc. In 2013, Linus Entertainment acquired 1980’s rock label Solid Gold Records.
