= List of certified albums in Canada =

This is list of albums that have been certified Gold, Platinum, and Diamond by Music Canada. Certification is based on the following table:

Certification	For releases before May 1, 2008	For releases after May 1, 2008
Gold	50,000	40,000
Platinum	100,000	80,000
Diamond	1,000,000	800,000

== Gold ==
- 0304
- 21 at 33
- A Christmas Album
- American Beauty/American Psycho
- A Night to Remember
- Ace Frehley
- Age to Age
- Agents of Fortune
- The Album
- Alive III
- Alive!
- All Jacked Up
- All Shook Up
- All Things Must Pass
- All You Can Eat
- American Gangster
- American Saturday Night
- Angel Clare
- Asylum
- Attack & Release
- A Year Without Rain
- Balance
- Bananaphone
- Bare
- Better Be Home Soon
- Black Butterfly
- Blonde
- Blue Moves
- Born to Fly
- Box Car Racer
- Brainwashed
- Brave New World
- British Steel
- Brushfire Fairytales
- Buckcherry
- Burlesque
- Busted
- Ceremonials
- Chaos and Creation in the Backyard
- Charmbracelet
- Chickenfoot
- Come What(ever) May
- The Concert in Central Park
- Curb
- Currents
- Danger Days: The True Lives of the Fabulous Killjoys
- Dangerous Acquaintances
- Dark Sky Island
- Death of a Bachelor
- Debut
- Deftones
- Disclaimer II
- Dive
- The Don Killuminati: The 7 Day Theory
- Double Live Gonzo!
- Double Platinum
- Dreaming of You
- Dreaming Out Loud
- Eagles Live
- Echo
- Escapology
- Evanescence
- Everywhere We Go
- Faceless
- Fear Inoculum
- Feeling Strangely Fine
- Finding Beauty in Negative Spaces
- Fire of Unknown Origin
- Fix Me
- Flowers in the Dirt
- The Foundation
- Free-for-All
- Gene Simmons
- Get Closer
- Get Happy!!
- Godsmack
- God's Son
- Going Back
- Good News for People Who Love Bad News
- Graffiti Bridge
- Greatest Hits
- Greatest Hits
- The Greyest of Blue Skies
- Harem
- Her Greatest Hits: Songs of Long Ago
- Hesitation Marks
- Hit and Run
- Holy Wood (In the Shadow of the Valley of Death)
- Home for Christmas
- Hooked
- Horizon
- Horse of a Different Color
- The House of Blue Light
- I Care 4 U
- If You See Him
- Illmatic
- Innuendo
- Inside Job
- Introducing Joss Stone
- Irresistible
- It's Not Me, It's You
- It Was Written
- Joy to the World
- Karma and Effect
- Kiss
- Kiss Symphony: Alive IV
- Kiss & Tell
- Last of the Ghetto Astronauts
- Lead Me On
- Led Zeppelin Boxed Set
- Les chemins de ma maison
- Lick It Up
- Life Is Peachy
- Lights and Sounds
- The Listening
- Live: Right Here, Right Now
- Lonerism
- Lotus
- Love Always
- Love on the Inside
- Lover/Fighter
- Love Sensuality Devotion: The Greatest Hits
- Luck... or Something
- Lungs
- Machina/The Machines of God
- Melt
- Mélanie
- Memory Almost Full
- Milk and Honey
- Modern Day Drifter
- Monsters in the Closet
- My Aim Is True
- My Kinda Party
- Musicology
- Nastradamus
- Neon Bible
- Now for Plan A
- Now or Never
- Au cœur du stade
- Ocean Avenue
- Off the Ground
- Old World Underground, Where Are You Now?
- On and On
- Once Bitten
- Painkiller
- Part II
- Paul Stanley
- Peter Criss
- Pinkerton
- Plastic Beach
- Playing the Angel
- Poses
- Pray for the Wicked
- Pretty Hate Machine
- Priest...Live!
- Psalm 69: The Way to Succeed and the Way to Suck Eggs
- Psycho Circus
- Ram It Down
- The Red Shoes
- Release the Stars
- Reptile
- Reveal
- Revenge
- Royal Blood
- Save Rock and Roll
- Say You Will
- Scream Dream
- The Screen Behind the Mirror
- See You on the Other Side
- Sempiternal
- The Sensual World
- Simply Deep
- Smile and Wave
- Soul Searchin'
- Songs from the West Coast
- The Sound of Madness
- State of Shock
- Sticks and Stones
- Still I Rise
- Stillmatic
- Storm in the Heartland
- Straight Ahead
- Street's Disciple
- Stronger
- Symphony
- Tailgates & Tanlines
- Talk on Corners
- Tango
- Ted Nugent
- Teeth and Tissue
- That's the Spirit
- This Year's Model
- Time Well Wasted
- Title of Record
- Too Weird to Live, Too Rare to Die!
- Torches
- Twice the Speed of Life
- Twisted Angel
- Under the Desert Sky
- Unguarded
- Unmasked
- The Very Best of Prince
- Vessel
- Vol. 3... Life and Times of S. Carter
- Vulgar Display of Power
- Watermark
- We Were Dead Before the Ship Even Sank
- What My Heart Already Knows
- Whatever and Ever Amen
- When the Sun Goes Down
- White Pony
- Who Needs Pictures
- The Whole Story
- Wild Life
- A Winter Symphony
- Wolfgang Amadeus Phoenix
- Working Class Hero: The Definitive Lennon
- You Get What You Give
- You're a Woman, I'm a Machine
- The Youth of Today

== Platinum ==
- 10,000 Days
- 15
- 1999
- 808s & Heartbreak
- À l'Olympia
- Ænima
- Aerial
- Alanis
- Alive II
- All Eyez on Me
- All I Ever Wanted
- All the World's a Stage
- Amore
- Andrea
- Animalize
- Appeal to Reason
- Aria: The Opera Album
- Armed Forces
- Artpop
- Astoria
- Awake
- B'Day
- Back to Black
- Bad Dreams
- Believe
- Belinda
- The Best of Andrea Bocelli: Vivere
- The Best of Sade
- The Big Picture
- The Black Album
- Black Sabbath Vol. 4
- Bleed American
- The Blueprint
- The Blueprint 3
- Bodyrock
- Bounce
- Bridges to Babylon
- Broken
- Broken English
- But Seriously, Folks...
- C'mon, C'mon
- Cat Scratch Fever
- Cheek to Cheek
- Chuck
- The Circle
- Classics
- The College Dropout
- Come On Over
- The Concert
- Counterparts
- Crazy Nights
- Damita Jo
- Dangerously in Love
- Day & Age
- Defenders of the Faith
- Defying Gravity
- Different Stages
- Dirt
- Diver Down
- The Documentary
- The Dream of the Blue Turtles
- Eden
- The Ego Has Landed
- Emancipation
- Endgame
- Elvis' Golden Records
- Everything Now
- Exit... Stage Left
- Eye to the Telescope
- Fair Warning
- Fantasies
- Far Beyond Driven
- A Farewell to Kings
- Feels Like Today
- Femme Fatale
- A Fever You Can't Sweat Out
- Finger Eleven
- Fly by Night
- For Unlawful Carnal Knowledge
- Freedom (Akon album)
- Get It on Credit
- Girls' Night Out
- Grace Under Pressure
- The Greatest Hits
- Greatest Hits
- Greatest Hits
- Greatest Hits, Etc.
- Greatest Hits: 18 Kids
- Green
- Hail to the King
- Have a Nice Day
- Head On
- Heart in Motion
- Heaven Tonight
- Hemispheres
- Here for the Party
- Hold Your Fire
- Hot Fuss
- Hot in the Shade
- Hounds of Love
- House of Love
- How the West Was Won
- Hymns of the 49th Parallel
- I Am... (Nas album)
- The Id
- I Look to You
- I Need You
- Infinity on High
- In Color
- Indestructible
- Iowa
- Is This It
- It's Your Call
- Janet Jackson's Rhythm Nation 1814
- JoJo
- Journeyman
- The Kick Inside
- The Last Temptation
- Lady Antebellum
- Lap of Luxury
- LeAnn Rimes
- Lennon Legend: The Very Best of John Lennon
- Life Starts Now
- Lionheart
- Live It Out
- Lookin' for Trouble
- Love Hurts
- Love Songs: A Compilation... Old and New
- Love, Pain & the Whole Crazy Thing
- La Luna
- Made in Heaven
- Magna Carta Holy Grail
- Make Believe
- Me and My Gang
- Mechanical Animals
- The Memory of Trees
- Mended
- Mercury Falling
- Metals
- Music from the Edge of Heaven
- My December
- Never for Ever
- A New Flame
- Nightmare
- No Fixed Address
- No Line on the Horizon
- Non-Stop Erotic Cabaret
- ...Nothing Like the Sun
- The Nylon Curtain
- Off the Wall
- One of These Nights
- Out of the Blue
- Own the Night
- Peace
- Perfect Strangers
- Permanent Waves
- Picture of Health
- Pipes of Peace
- Planet Pit
- Play On
- Power Windows
- Presto
- Prism
- Quelqu'un m'a dit
- Racine carrée
- Ram
- Recovery
- Red Rose Speedway
- Return of Saturn
- Revival
- Rise and Fall, Rage and Grace
- Rock of the Westies
- Rock Steady
- Le Roi est mort, vive le Roi!
- Roll the Bones
- Rule 3:36
- Runaway Horses
- Savage
- Screaming for Vengeance
- See Forever Eyes
- Sentimento
- Shaking the Tree: Sixteen Golden Greats
- A Show of Hands
- The Sickness
- Signals
- A Single Man
- Siren Song of the Counter Culture
- Sittin' on Top of the World
- Slipknot
- Smashes, Thrashes & Hits
- Smells Like Children
- Smile
- Smoke + Mirrors
- Songs of Faith and Devotion
- Soul
- The Soul Cages
- The Soul Sessions
- Spirit
- The State
- Still Crazy After All These Years
- Still Waters
- Stronger Than Pride
- The Sufferer & the Witness
- Synthetica
- Tellement j'ai d'amour...
- Ten Summoner's Tales
- Ten Thousand Fists
- Thank Me Later
- Thankful
- Them vs. You vs. Me
- Three Days Grace
- To the Sea
- Too Low for Zero
- Traveling Wilburys Vol. 3
- Trench
- Turbo
- Turn Blue
- U218 Singles
- Unchained Melody: The Early Years
- Under Rug Swept
- Underdogs
- Undertow
- Vol. 2... Hard Knock Life
- Venus and Mars
- Verdi
- Very
- The Very Best of Cher
- The Very Best of Fleetwood Mac
- Viaggio Italiano
- Vol. 3: (The Subliminal Verses)
- Watch the Throne
- Weekend Warriors
- Weezer (Green Album)
- Wings Greatest
- With Teeth
- Working on a Dream
- The Works

== Multi-platinum ==
=== Two times ===
- 2112
- 21st Century Breakdown
- Adore
- A Head Full of Dreams
- Animal
- Antichrist Superstar
- Aquarius
- Armageddon
- As I Am
- Awake
- Back to the Egg
- Be Here
- Bedtime Stories
- Best Of – Volume I
- Beautiful Midnight
- The Blueprint 2: The Gift & The Curse
- Brand New Day
- By the Way
- Cieli di Toscana
- Collision Course
- The Cross of Changes
- Crush
- D'elles
- Diamond Life
- Diamonds and Pearls
- Dion chante Plamondon
- Diva
- Dynasty
- The End of the Innocence
- Evolve
- Fever
- The Fragile
- From Under the Cork Tree
- Funeral
- Ghost Stories
- Golden Road
- Graduation
- Greatest Hits
- Greatest Hits Volume Two
- Heaven on Earth
- Here and Now
- Highway to Hell
- Incognito
- Ingénue
- Issues
- It Won't Be the Last
- Ixnay on the Hombre
- J.Lo
- Late Registration
- Lateralus
- Legend
- Live After Death
- Live à Paris
- Loud
- Made in England
- Marc Anthony
- MCMXC a.D.
- Medusa
- Most Wanted
- My Love: Essential Collection
- New Adventures in Hi-Fi
- Nothing But The Beat
- A New World Record
- Older
- One Love
- One-X
- Oral Fixation Vol. 2
- Parachutes
- PCD
- The Phantom of the Opera
- Piece of Mind
- Powerslave
- Reg Strikes Back
- ReLoad
- Revenge
- The Rhythm of the Saints
- Rock 'n Soul Part 1
- The Seeds of Love
- The Singles 1992–2003
- Sleeping with the Past
- The Slim Shady LP
- (Songbook) A Collection of Hits
- Sorry for Party Rocking
- Speak Now (Taylor's Version)
- Storm Front
- The Suburbs
- The Sweet Escape
- These Days
- Toto IV
- Toxicity
- True Colors
- Tubular Bells
- ...Twice Shy
- Until the End of Time
- Us
- Van Halen II
- The Very Best Of
- Violator
- Vuelve
- We Sing. We Dance. We Steal Things.
- Who Are You
- Witness
- Women and Children First
- You Light Up My Life: Inspirational Songs

=== Three times ===
- 5150
- All Saints
- Back to Basics
- Balance
- Barbra Streisand's Greatest Hits Vol. 2
- Batman
- The Best of 1990–2000
- Better Dayz
- Billy Talent
- Billy Talent II
- Blue
- Britney
- Brothers
- Circus
- Dangerously in Love
- Discovery
- The Downward Spiral
- Dream Police
- The Emancipation of Mimi
- Ever After
- Fearless (Taylor's Version)
- Follow the Leader
- Funhouse
- Greatest Hits
- Greatest Hits
- In Between Dreams
- Into the Fire
- An Innocent Man
- The Massacre
- Masterpiece Theatre
- Mylo Xyloto
- Mystery Girl
- Need You Now
- The Number of the Beast
- On How Life Is
- On ne change pas
- One Heart
- The One
- Pain Is Love
- Phantom Power
- Reflektor
- River of Dreams
- Sans attendre
- Shakin' Like a Human Being
- Shepherd Moons
- Sheryl Crow
- Some Hearts
- Speak Now
- Stripped
- Time to Say Goodbye
- Tuesday Night Music Club
- Under the Mistletoe
- Vagabond Heart
- Watermark
- Wintersong

=== Four times ===
- 1989 (Taylor's Version)
- 52nd Street
- Adrenalize
- The Black Parade
- Bridge Over Troubled Water
- Crazy Love
- El Camino
- Enema of the State
- Evermore
- Fearless
- Greatest Hits
- Heart of Stone
- The Life of a Showgirl
- Loved Me Back to Life
- The Marshall Mathers LP 2
- Metamorphosis
- Moving Pictures
- No Angel
- Only by the Night
- Parallel Lines
- Pearl
- Red
- Red (Taylor's Version)
- A Rush of Blood to the Head
- Siamese Dream
- Sign o' the Times
- S'il suffisait d'aimer
- Supposed Former Infatuation Junkie
- Taking Chances
- Three Cheers for Sweet Revenge
- Van Halen
- Weezer (Blue Album)

=== Five times ===
- 1100 Bel Air Place
- 1984
- 8 Mile
- Breakaway
- Cheap Trick at Budokan
- ELV1S
- Escape
- Forty Licks
- Glass Houses
- Guilty
- I Dreamed a Dream
- Laundry Service
- A Little Bit of Mambo
- The Long Road
- Love. Angel. Music. Baby.
- One of the Boys
- The Razors Edge
- Sogno
- Songs in A Minor
- Spirits Having Flown
- Tango in the Night
- Taylor Swift
- Trouble at the Henhouse
- Under My Skin
- The Very Best of Sheryl Crow
- Viva la Vida or Death and All His Friends
- When We All Fall Asleep, Where Do We Go?
- X&Y
- The Writing's on the Wall

=== Six times ===
- A New Day Has Come
- Believe
- Born This Way
- The Best of 1980–1990
- Blurryface
- Christina Aguilera
- Confessions
- Dangerous
- Day for Night
- Dark Horse
- In Utero
- I Am... Sasha Fierce
- Make It Big
- Monster
- Purple Rain
- So Far So Good
- Traveling Wilburys Vol. 1
- Five Days in July
- 1989

=== Seven times ===
- All the Right Reasons
- Automatic for the People
- D'eux
- Fallen
- The Fame
- Folklore
- Hell Freezes Over
- The Immaculate Collection
- Night Visions
- Pyromania
- Ten
- The Tortured Poets Department
- Unison

=== Eight times ===
- A Day Without Rain
- Americana
- Get Rich or Die Tryin'
- The Marshall Mathers LP
- Prism
- Reputation
- Sgt. Pepper's Lonely Hearts Club Band
- Silver Side Up
- She's So Unusual
- (What's the Story) Morning Glory?

=== Nine times ===
- Led Zeppelin II
- Lover
- Use Your Illusion II

== Diamond ==
Artist	Album	Date certified
Various artists	Saturday Night Fever	June 1978
Various artists	Grease	November 1978
Supertramp	Breakfast in America	October 1979
Supertramp	Crime of the Century	November 1979
Kenny Rogers	Greatest Hits	June 1981
Led Zeppelin	Led Zeppelin	December 1982
Culture Club	Colour by Numbers	May 1984
Lionel Richie	Can't Slow Down	November 1984
Bruce Springsteen	Born in the U.S.A.	July 1985
Bryan Adams	Reckless	December 1985
Corey Hart	Boy in the Box	February 1986
Dire Straits	Brothers in Arms	April 1986
Phil Collins	No Jacket Required	April 1986
Whitney Houston	Whitney Houston	March 1987
Madonna	True Blue	June 1987
Bon Jovi	Slippery When Wet	October 1987
U2	The Joshua Tree	October 1987
The Eagles	Hotel California	January 1988
Various artists	Dirty Dancing	August 1988
Huey Lewis and the News	Sports	August 1988
Elton John	Greatest Hits Vol. 1	October 1988
Def Leppard	Hysteria	November 1988
AC/DC	Back in Black	October 1989
Milli Vanilli	Girl You Know It's True	March 1990
Alannah Myles	Alannah Myles	December 1990
New Kids on the Block	Hangin' Tough	February 1991
George Michael	Faith	October 1991
INXS	Kick	November 1991
Various artists	Cocktail	January 1992
Bryan Adams	Waking Up the Neighbours	June 1992
ZZ Top	Eliminator	June 1992
Guns N' Roses	Appetite for Destruction	July 1992
Madonna	Like a Virgin	July 1992
Eric Clapton	Unplugged	August 1993
Whitney Houston/Various artists	The Bodyguard	September 1993
Celine Dion	The Colour of My Love	November 1994
The Beatles	Abbey Road	March 1995
The Beatles	1962–1966	March 1995
The Beatles	1967–1970	March 1995
Ace of Base	The Sign	March 1995
Billy Ray Cyrus	Some Gave All	May 1995
Various artists	The Lion King	May 1995
Aerosmith	Get a Grip	June 1995
Garth Brooks	The Hits	July 1995
Various artists	Forrest Gump	August 1995
Tom Cochrane	Mad Mad World	September 1995
Green Day	Dookie	November 1995
Hootie and the Blowfish	Cracked Rear View	March 1996
Various artists	Oh What a Feeling: A Vital Collection of Canadian Music	May 1996
The Smashing Pumpkins	Mellon Collie and the Infinite Sadness	August 1996
Phil Collins	Face Value	November 1996
Celine Dion	Falling into You	November 1996
Boston	Boston	May 1997
No Doubt	Tragic Kingdom	August 1997
Celine Dion	Let's Talk About Love	November 1997
Various artists	Titanic	March 1998
Various artists	Big Shiny Tunes 2	March 1998
Backstreet Boys	Backstreet Boys	May 1998
Backstreet Boys	Backstreet's Back	May 1998
Spice Girls	Spice	July 1998
Celine Dion	Celine Dion	July 1998
Aqua	Aquarium	August 1998
Metallica	Metallica	August 1998
Savage Garden	Savage Garden	September 1998
Sarah McLachlan	Surfacing	October 1998
Spice Girls	Spiceworld	October 1998
The Tragically Hip	Up to Here	January 1999
Andrea Bocelli	Romanza	March 1999
Backstreet Boys	Millennium	October 1999
Britney Spears	...Baby One More Time	December 1999
Ricky Martin	Ricky Martin	December 1999
Amanda Marshall	Amanda Marshall	April 2000
ABBA	ABBA Gold: Greatest Hits	May 2000
Santana	Supernatural	July 2000
Barenaked Ladies	Gordon	September 2000
Bon Jovi	Cross Road: Greatest Hits	November 2000
U2	Achtung Baby	December 2000
The Beatles	1	February 2001
Our Lady Peace	Clumsy	February 2001
Guns N' Roses	Use Your Illusion I	March 2001
Nirvana	Nevermind	March 2001
Avril Lavigne	Let Go	May 2003
Steve Miller Band	Greatest Hits (1974–1978)	August 2003
Eminem	The Eminem Show	September 2003
Norah Jones	Come Away with Me	January 2007
The Tragically Hip	Fully Completely	January 2007
Celine Dion	These Are Special Times	October 2007
Celine Dion	All the Way… A Decade of Song	October 2007
The Beatles	The Beatles Stereo Box Set	April 2010
Michael Bublé	Christmas	December 2014
Adele	25	January 2016
The Tragically Hip	Road Apples	April 2017
Ed Sheeran	X	October 2021
Ed Sheeran	÷	October 2021
The Tragically Hip	Yer Favourites	April 2023
Katy Perry	Teenage Dream	May 2023
Shania Twain	Greatest Hits (Shania Twain album)	June 2023
*N SYNC	No Strings Attached	September 2023
Green Day	American Idiot	October 2023
Lady Gaga	The Fame Monster	February 2024
Various artists	Guardians of the Galaxy: Awesome Mix Vol. 1	October 2024
Michael Jackson	Bad (album)	January 2025
Bruno Mars	Doo-Wops & Hooligans	April 2025
Ed Sheeran	+−=÷× (Tour Collection)	January 2026

=== Double diamond ===
Artist	Album	Date certified (first cert.)	Date certified (second cert.)
Eagles	Their Greatest Hits (1971–1975)	1987-07-30	1987-07-30
Fleetwood Mac	Rumours	1978-05-01	1995-06-27
Led Zeppelin	Led Zeppelin IV	1992-12-10	1995-06-28
Meat Loaf	Bat Out of Hell	1979-03-01	1995-08-31
Pink Floyd	The Wall	1987-12-09	1995-08-31
Alanis Morissette	Jagged Little Pill	1996-03-20	1996-11-12
Shania Twain	The Woman in Me	1996-02-29	1999-04-09
Shania Twain	Come on Over	1999-04-09	2000-01-21
Pink Floyd	The Dark Side of the Moon	1980-09-01	2003-03-14
Shania Twain	Up!	2002-12-06	2004-12-21
Adele	21	2011-11-22	2018-09-20

=== Triple diamond ===
Artist	Album	Date certified (first cert.)	Date certified (second cert.)	Date certified (third cert.)
Michael Jackson	Thriller	1983-12-01	1984-04-01	2022-05-11

== See also ==
- List of diamond-certified albums in Canada
- List of music recording certifications
