= List of awards and nominations received by Andrea Bocelli =

Andrea Bocelli awards and nominations
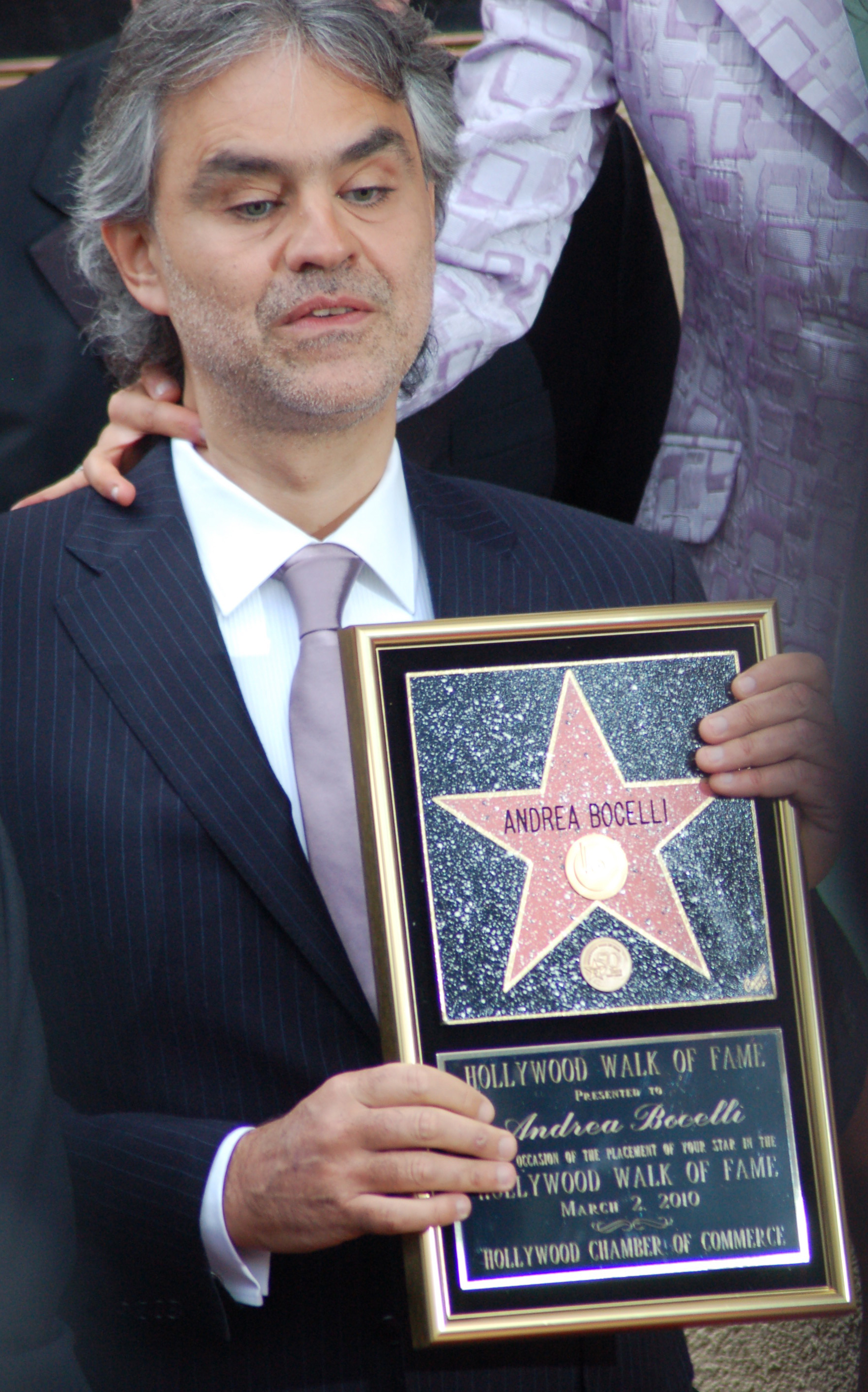
- Bocelli received a star on the Hollywood Walk of Fame in 2010
Awards and nominations
| Award | Wins | Nominations |
| Grammy | 0 | 3 |
| Emmy Awards | 0 | 1 |
| Classical Brit Awards | 6 | 13 |
| ECHO Awards | 1 | 3 |
| ECHO Klassik Awards | 3 | 6 |
| Telegatto Awards | 2 | 2 |
| World Music Awards | 7 | 10 |

Totals (Note: Certain award groups do not simply award one winner. They acknowledge several different recipients, have runners-up, and have third place. Since this is a specific recognition and is different from losing an award, runner-up mentions are considered wins in this award tally. For simplification and to avoid errors, each award in this list has been presumed to have had a prior nomination.)
- Wins: 20
- Nominations: 40

Andrea Bocelli is a multiple Classical Brit-winning and Grammy and Emmy nominated, Italian pop tenor and crossover artist. Since winning the Newcomers section of the Sanremo Music Festival, in 1994, he has sold over 80 million albums worldwide, making him the biggest-selling singer in the history of Classical music.

In 1998, he was named one of People Magazine's 50 Most Beautiful People. In 1999, his nomination for Best New Artist at the Grammy Awards marked the first time a classical artist had been nominated in the category, since Leontyne Price, in 1961. The Prayer, his duet with Celine Dion for the animated film, The Quest for Camelot, won the Golden Globe for Best Original Song and was nominated for an Academy Award in the same category. With the release of his classical album, Sacred Arias, Bocelli captured a listing in the Guinness Book of World Records, as he simultaneously held the No. 1, 2 and 3 positions on the U.S. Classical albums charts. The next three-and-a-half years followed with Bocelli holding permanent residency at the No. 1 spot. Six of his albums have since reached the Top 10 on the Billboard 200, and a record-setting 8, have topped the classical albums charts in the United States.

With 5 million units sold worldwide, Sacred Arias became the biggest-selling classical album by a solo artist of all time, and with over 20 million copies sold worldwide, his 1997 pop album, Romanza, became the best-selling album by an Italian artist of any genre in history, as well as the best-selling album by a foreign artist in Canada, and a number of other countries in Europe and Latin America. The album's first single, "Time to Say Goodbye", topped charts all across Europe, including Germany, where it stayed at the top of the charts for fourteen consecutive weeks, breaking the all-time sales record, with over 3 million copies sold in the country. The single went on to sell over 12 million copies worldwide, making it one of the best-selling singles of all time. He is widely regarded as the most popular Italian and classical singer in the world.

In 2006, Bocelli was made a Grand Officer of the Order of Merit of the Italian Republic, and on March 2, 2010, he was honoured with a star on the Hollywood Walk of Fame.

== Honorifics ==
- Grand Officer of the Order of Merit of the Italian Republic (Grande Ufficiale Ordine al Merito della Repubblica Italiana) awarded in Rome, on March 4, 2006.
- Grand Officer of the Order of Merit of Duarte, Sánchez and Mella by the President of the Dominican Republic, Leonel Fernández in 2009, for his contributions to International art and culture.
- Golden Medal for Merits of Serbia awarded on 22 July 2022 in Belgrade.
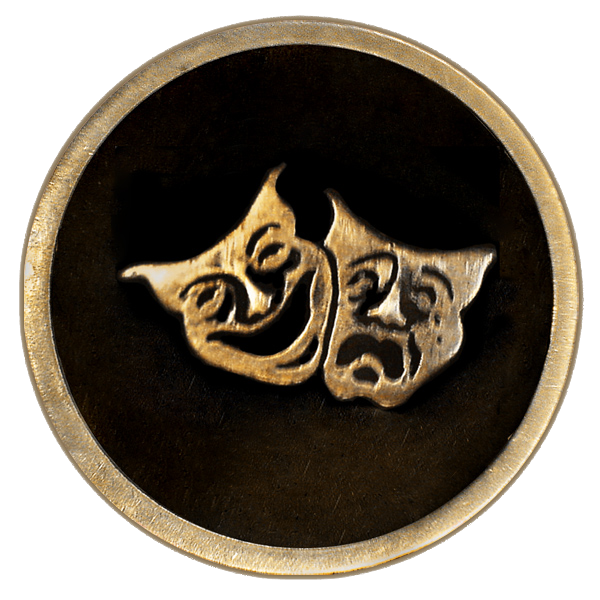
- Star on the Hollywood Walk of Fame, for his contribution to live theater, at 7000 Hollywood Boulevard, in 2010.
- Knight of the Civil Order of Savoy by Emanuele Filiberto of Savoy in 2025.

== Awards ==
=== Bambi Awards ===
- Bambi Award in 1997.

=== Billboard Latin Music Awards ===
- Bocelli has won a total of 2 Billboard Latin Music Awards from 4 nominations.

| Year | Nominee / work | Award | Result |
|---|---|---|---|
| 2007 | Amor | Latin Pop Album of the Year, Male | Won |
| 2014 | Pasión | Latin Pop Album of the Year | Nominated |
| 2014 | Andrea Bocelli | Latin Pop Albums Artist of the Year, Solo | Nominated |
| 2014 | Andrea Bocelli | Lifetime Achievement Award | Won |

=== Classical Brit Awards ===
Bocelli has won 6 Classical BRITS, including the Outstanding Contribution to Music award in 2002, and has received 13 nominations.

| Year | Nominee / work | Award | Result |
|---|---|---|---|
| 2000 | Andrea Bocelli | Male Artist of the Year | Nominated |
| 2000 | Aria: The Opera Album | Album of the Year | Nominated |
| 2000 | Sacred Arias | Album of the Year | Won |
| 2000 | Sacred Arias | Best Selling Classical Album | Won |
| 2001 | Verdi | Rover Album of the Year | Nominated |
| 2002 | Andrea Bocelli | Outstanding Contribution to Music | Won |
| 2003 | Sentimento | Male Artist of the Year | Nominated |
| 2003 | Sentimento | Album of the Year | Won |
| 2003 | Sentimento | Best Selling Classical Album | Won |
| 2009 | Incanto | NS&I Album of the Year | Nominated |
| 2012 | Andrea Bocelli | International Artist of the Year | Won |
| 2012 | Concerto: One Night in Central Park | Male Artist of the Year | Nominated |
| 2012 | Concerto: One Night in Central Park | Album of the Year | Nominated |

=== ECHO Awards ===
Bocelli received an ECHO music award for in 1997.

| Year | Nominee / work | Award | Result |
|---|---|---|---|
| 1997 | "Time to Say Goodbye" | Single of the Year | Won |

=== ECHO Klassik Awards ===
- Bocelli has won a total of 3 ECHO Klassik awards.

| Year | Nominee / work | Award | Result |
|---|---|---|---|
| 1997 | Viaggio Italiano | Best seller of the year | Won |
| 1998 | Aria: The Opera Album | Best selling classical album | Won |
| 2000 | Sacred Arias | Best seller of the year | Won |

=== Emmy Awards ===
- Emmy Award nomination for Outstanding Classical Music-Dance Program for the 2000 Great Performances program, Andrea Bocelli: Sacred Arias in 2000.

=== Goldene Europa Awards ===
- Goldene Europa for classical music in 2000.

=== Goldene Kamera Awards ===
- Goldene Kamera award in the "Music & Entertainment" category 2002.

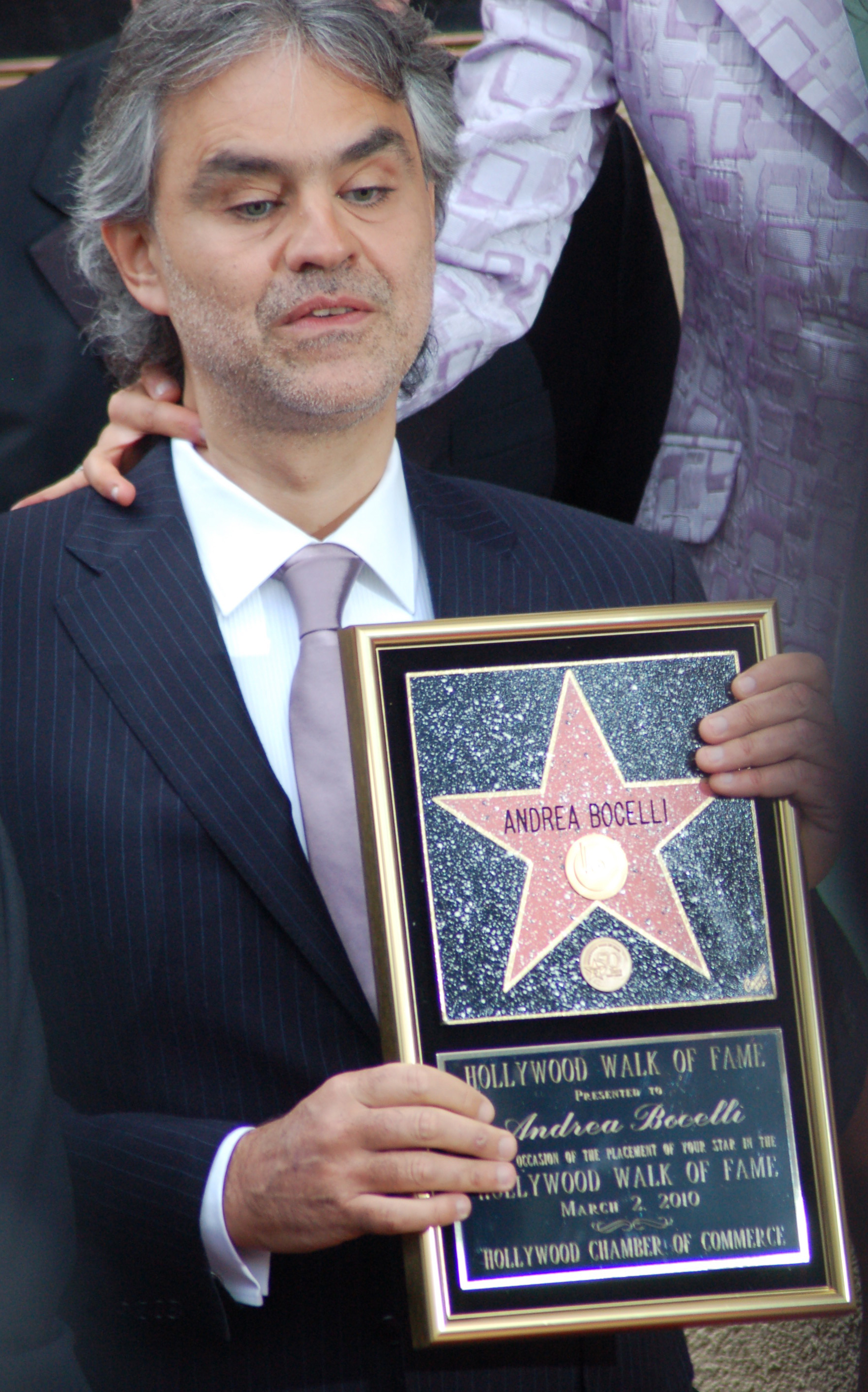
Bocelli receiving his Star on the Hollywood Walk of Fame, March 2, 2010, on Hollywood Boulevard, Los Angeles, California.

=== Grammy Awards ===
Bocelli has been nominated six times for a Grammy Award.

| Year | Nominee / work | Award | Result |
|---|---|---|---|
| 1999 | Andrea Bocelli | Best New Artist | Nominated |
| 2000 | Sogno | Best Male Pop Vocal Performance | Nominated |
| 2000 | "The Prayer" | Best Pop Collaboration with Vocals | Nominated |
| 2017 | Cinema | Best Traditional Pop Vocal Album | Nominated |
| 2020 | Sì | Best Traditional Pop Vocal Album | Nominated |

=== Latin Grammy Awards ===
- Bocelli has been nominated a total of 6 Latin Grammy Awards

| Year | Nominee / work | Award | Result |
|---|---|---|---|
| 2006 | Amor | Best Male Pop Vocal Album | Nominated |
| 2008 | "Vive ya! (Vivere)" (with Laura Pausini) | Record of the Year | Nominated |
| 2014 | Amor en Portofino | Best Traditional Pop Vocal Album | Nominated |
| 2016 | "Me faltarás" | Record of the Year | Nominated |
| 2016 | Cinema (Edicion en Español) | Album of the Year | Nominated |
| 2016 | Cinema (Edicion en Español) | Best Traditional Pop Vocal Album | Nominated |

=== Lo Nuestro Awards ===
- Bocelli has been nominated a total of 2 Lo Nuestro Awards

| Year | Nominee / work | Award | Result |
|---|---|---|---|
| 1999 | Andrea Bocelli | Pop New Artist of the Year | Nominated |
| 1999 | Andrea Bocelli and Marta Sánchez | Pop Group or Duo of the Year | Nominated |

=== Telegatto Awards ===
- Telegatto award for the soundtrack of the series Cuore in 2002.
- Telegatto award in platinum for Italian music in the world in 2008.

=== World Music Awards ===
Bocelli has won 7 World Music Awards, and has received numerous nominations.

| Year | Nominee / work | Award | Result |
|---|---|---|---|
| 1998 | Andrea Bocelli | Best-selling Classical Artist | Won |
| 1998 | Andrea Bocelli | Best-selling Italian Singer | Won |
| 2002 | Andrea Bocelli | Best-selling Classical Artist | Won |
| 2002 | Andrea Bocelli | Best-selling Italian Singer | Won |
| 2006 | Andrea Bocelli | Best-selling Classical Artist | Won |
| 2006 | Andrea Bocelli | Best-selling Italian Singer | Won |
| 2010 | Andrea Bocelli | Best-selling Classical Artist | Won |

=== Other awards ===
- Winner of the 1994 Newcomers section of the Sanremo Music Festival.
- Special award for more than 40 million album sales worldwide in 2000.
- Platinum Europe Award for 1 million sales of the album Cieli di Toscana in 2001.
- "Favourite Specialist Performer" award at the ITV National Music Awards in 2003.
- "Diamond CD" for more than 50 million albums sold worldwide, in 2004.
- Amore was awarded for Top 10 Best Selling Foreign Albums by IFPI Hong Kong Top Sales Music Awards in 2006.
- Premio Barocco for his "extraordinary career" awarded in Gallipoli, in 2007.
- Four times Diamond disc for Incanto, at the Italian talk show Che tempo che fa, for selling in excess to 1.5 million copies within 4 month, in 2009.
- America Award of the Italy-USA Foundation in 2012.
