= Your Daddy Don't Know =

1982 single by Toronto

Song by Toronto

from the album Get It on Credit
- Released: 1982
- Genre: Hard rock; pop rock
- Length: 3:17
- Label: Network; Solid Gold
- Songwriters: Geoffrey Iwamoto; Michael Roth
- Producer: Steve Smith

"Your Daddy Don't Know (What Your Mama's Gonna Do Tonight)" is a song by the Canadian rock band Toronto, from their 1982 album Get It on Credit.

The song was written by Geoffrey Iwamoto and Michael Roth, and was the only song on the album not written or co-written by any member of the band. Iwamoto and Roth were a songwriting duo whose other noteworthy song, "My Heart Is Still Young", was recorded by Jennifer Rush and Paris Black. The song has been interpreted as being about a stripper, or about a woman planning to cheat on her husband; the band's keyboardist Scott Kreyer claimed in interviews to not know what the song was actually about.

== Impact ==
The band's biggest chart hit, it peaked at #5 in the RPM charts in Canada, and at #77 on the Billboard charts in the United States. In 1983, it was used as the soundtrack to a Labatt Blue beer commercial.

Despite its popular success, the song has received mixed reception from critics; Evan Cater of AllMusic refers to the album as a "debacle" and does not single out "Your Daddy Don't Know" as an exception to his negative assessment of the album's quality, while Greg Burliuk of the Kingston Whig-Standard named it as a highlight of the album and later wrote that the lack of a single of equivalent strength was one of the biggest problems with the band's followup album Girls' Night Out. When the song began receiving radio airplay in the United States, Scott Benarde of the South Florida Sun Sentinel called it "far from the best the album offers", and opined that it "really sounds like a rip-off of a couple of Rick Springfield tunes".

The song was nominated for two Juno Awards at the Juno Awards of 1983, for Bestselling Single of the Year and Songwriter of the Year.

== Legacy ==
In 1984, it was included in the band's Greatest Hits compilation.

The song was included in the 2001 edition of Oh What a Feeling: A Vital Collection of Canadian Music, a multi-disc compilation of Canadian pop and rock hits released to mark the 30th anniversary of the Juno Awards.

In 2002, the song was recorded by the New Pornographers, with Neko Case on lead vocals, for the film soundtrack Fubar: The Album, which featured contemporary Canadian bands recording covers of 1980s Canadian rock hits.

In 2022, the song was used as a lip sync number in an episode of Canada's Drag Race: Canada vs. the World.
