= Oh What a Feeling: A Vital Collection of Canadian Music =

Compilation album by Various artists
- Released: January 24, 1996
- Label: CARAS/MCA

Oh What a Feeling: A Vital Collection of Canadian Music is a 4-CD box set released in 1996 to celebrate the 25th anniversary of the Juno Awards. A second box set, Oh What a Feeling 2, was released in 2001 to mark the awards' 30th anniversary, and a third set, Oh What a Feeling 3, was released in 2006 for the 35th anniversary. All of the sets feature popular Canadian songs from the 1960s onward. The sets were titled for the song "Oh What a Feeling" by rock band Crowbar. The original 25th anniversary box set peaked at No. 3 on the Canadian Albums Chart and was certified Diamond in Canada.

== 1996 release ==
=== Disc 1 ===
1. The Guess Who, "American Woman" (1970)
2. Lighthouse, "One Fine Morning" (1971)
3. Crowbar, "Oh, What a Feeling" (1971)
4. Steppenwolf, "Born to Be Wild" (1968)
5. Sweeney Todd, "Roxy Roller" (1974)
6. Downchild Blues Band, "(I Got Everything I Need) Almost" (1974)
7. Powder Blues Band, "Doin' it Right" (1983)
8. Trooper, "Raise a Little Hell" (1978)
9. Chilliwack, "Fly at Night" (1977)
10. Triumph, "Magic Power" (1981)
11. Saga, "On the Loose" (1981)
12. A Foot in Coldwater, "(Make Me Do) Anything You Want" (1972/1974)
13. Burton Cummings, "Stand Tall" (1977)
14. Bachman–Turner Overdrive, "Takin' Care of Business" (1973)
15. Rough Trade, "High School Confidential" (1980)
16. The Pursuit of Happiness, "I'm an Adult Now" (1986)
17. Martha and the Muffins, "Echo Beach" (1980)
18. Cowboy Junkies, "Misguided Angel" (1989)
19. Parachute Club, "Rise Up" (1984)

=== Disc 2 ===
1. Rush, "Closer to the Heart" (1977)
2. Loverboy, "Turn Me Loose" (1980)
3. Bryan Adams, "Cuts Like A Knife" (1983)
4. Corey Hart, "Sunglasses at Night" (1983)
5. The Payolas, "Eyes of a Stranger" (1982)
6. The Jeff Healey Band, "See the Light" (1987)
7. Colin James, "Just Came Back" (1990)
8. Kim Mitchell, "Patio Lanterns" (1986)
9. Honeymoon Suite, "New Girl Now" (1984)
10. Glass Tiger, "Don't Forget Me (When I'm Gone)" (1986)
11. Maestro Fresh Wes, "Let Your Backbone Slide" (1989)
12. Bruce Cockburn, "If I Had a Rocket Launcher" (1984)
13. Barenaked Ladies, "If I Had a Million Dollars" (1992)
14. The Tragically Hip, "New Orleans Is Sinking" (1989)
15. Tom Cochrane, "Life Is a Highway" (1991)
16. Moist, "Push" (1994)
17. Alanis Morissette, "You Oughta Know" (1995)

=== Disc 3 ===
1. Anne Murray, "Snowbird" (1970)
2. The Guess Who, "These Eyes" (1968)
3. Stampeders, "Sweet City Woman" (1971)
4. Five Man Electrical Band, "Signs" (1971)
5. April Wine, "You Could Have Been a Lady" (1972)
6. Mashmakhan, "As the Years Go By" (1970)
7. The Poppy Family, "Which Way You Goin' Billy?" (1969)
8. Motherlode, "When I Die" (1969)
9. Blood, Sweat and Tears, "Spinning Wheel" (1969)
10. The Band, "The Weight" (1968)
11. Ocean, "Put Your Hand in the Hand" (1971)
12. The Bells, "Stay Awhile" (1971)
13. Frank Mills, "Music Box Dancer" (1968)
14. Skylark, "Wildflower" (1972/1978)
15. Ian & Sylvia, "Four Strong Winds" (1962)
16. Leonard Cohen, "Suzanne" (1968)
17. Valdy, "Play Me a Rock 'n Roll Song" (1972)
18. Murray McLauchlan, "Farmer's Song" (1974)
19. Ian Thomas, "Painted Ladies" (1973)
20. Terry Jacks, "Seasons in the Sun" (1973)
21. Andy Kim, "Rock Me Gently" (1974)
22. Hagood Hardy, "The Homecoming" (1973)
23. Edward Bear, "Last Song" (1972)

=== Disc 4 ===
1. Céline Dion, "Where Does My Heart Beat Now" (1993)
2. Roch Voisine, "Hélène" (1986)
3. Gino Vannelli, "I Just Wanna Stop" (1978)
4. Alannah Myles, "Black Velvet" (1989)
5. Jann Arden, "Could I Be Your Girl" (1994)
6. k.d. lang, "Constant Craving" (1992)
7. The Rankin Family, "Fare Thee Well Love" (1989)
8. Gordon Lightfoot, "If You Could Read My Mind" (1970)
9. Neil Young, "Helpless" (1970)
10. Dan Hill, "Sometimes When We Touch" (1978)
11. Anne Murray, "You Needed Me" (1978)
12. Rita MacNeil, "Flying On Your Own" (1987)
13. Luba, "How Many Rivers to Cross" (1987)
14. Blue Rodeo, "Try" (1987)
15. Robbie Robertson, "Showdown at Big Sky" (1987)
16. Sarah McLachlan, "Hold On" (1996)
17. Crash Test Dummies, "Superman's Song" (1991)
18. Northern Lights, "Tears Are Not Enough" (1985)

== 2001 release ==
=== Disc 1 ===
1. Shania Twain, "Man! I Feel Like a Woman!" (1999)
2. Sarah McLachlan, "Building a Mystery" (1997)
3. Alanis Morissette, "Thank U" (1998)
4. Jann Arden, "Insensitive" (1995)
5. Chantal Kreviazuk, "Before You" (1999)
6. Tal Bachman, "She's So High" (1999)
7. Len, "Steal My Sunshine" (1999)
8. Bran Van 3000, "Drinking in L.A." (1997)
9. The Moffatts, "Misery" (1999)
10. Sky, "Love Song" (1998)
11. Souldecision, "Faded" (1999)
12. Amanda Marshall, "Birmingham" (1996)
13. Céline Dion, "My Heart Will Go On" (1998)
14. Deborah Cox, "Nobody's Supposed to Be Here" (1998)
15. Dream Warriors, "My Definition of a Boombastic Jazz Style" (1997)
16. Snow, "Informer" (1993/1998)
17. Choclair, "Let's Ride" (2000)
18. Rascalz ft. Checkmate, Kardinal Offishall, Thrust and Choclair, "Northern Touch" (2000)

=== Disc 2 ===
1. Loverboy, "The Kid Is Hot Tonite" (1982)
2. Aldo Nova, "Fantasy" (1981)
3. Prism, "Spaceship Superstar" (1978)
4. Red Rider, "Lunatic Fringe" (1981)
5. Trooper, "We're Here for a Good Time" (1977)
6. Bachman–Turner Overdrive, "You Ain't Seen Nothing Yet" (1974)
7. Bryan Adams, "Summer of '69" (1984)
8. Barney Bentall and the Legendary Hearts, "Something to Live For" (1987)
9. Rush, "The Spirit of Radio" (1980)
10. Lee Aaron, "Whatcha Do to My Body" (1987)
11. Toronto, "Your Daddy Don't Know" (1982)
12. Headpins, "Don't It Make Ya Feel" (1984)
13. Helix, "Rock You" (1983)
14. 54-40, "One Day in Your Life" (1987)
15. Matthew Good Band, "Hello Time Bomb" (1999)
16. Sloan, "Underwhelmed" (1992)
17. The Tea Party, "Heaven Coming Down" (1999)
18. Our Lady Peace, "Clumsy" (1997)
19. The Tragically Hip, "Ahead By a Century" (1996)

=== Disc 3 ===
1. The Guess Who, "Share the Land" (1970)
2. Lighthouse, "Sunny Days" (1972)
3. Keith Hampshire, "The First Cut Is the Deepest" (1973)
4. Copperpenny, "Sitting on a Poor Man's Throne" (1972)
5. Dr. Music, "One More Mountain to Climb" (1976)
6. The Band, "Up on Cripple Creek" (1969)
7. Pagliaro, "Lovin' You Ain't Easy" (1971)
8. Anne Murray, "Danny's Song" (1973)
9. Nick Gilder, "Hot Child in the City" (1978)
10. Platinum Blonde, "Crying Over You" (1985)
11. Max Webster, "A Million Vacations" (1974)
12. Klaatu, "Calling Occupants of Interplanetary Craft" (1977)
13. Gowan, "A Criminal Mind" (1983)
14. Burton Cummings, "Break It to Them Gently" (1978)
15. Doug and the Slugs, "Too Bad" (1980)
16. Men Without Hats, "The Safety Dance" (1982)
17. Crash Test Dummies, "Mmm Mmm Mmm Mmm" (1993)
18. Kim Mitchell, "Go for Soda" (1984)
19. The Northern Pikes, "She Ain't Pretty" (1990)
20. The Kings, "Switchin' to Glide / This Beat Goes On" (1980)

=== Disc 4 ===
1. Neil Young, "Heart of Gold" (1972)
2. Joni Mitchell, "Help Me" (1973)
3. Gordon Lightfoot, "Carefree Highway" (1974)
4. Bruce Cockburn, "Wondering Where the Lions Are" (1979)
5. Murray McLauchlan, "On the Boulevard" (1975)
6. Leonard Cohen, "Bird on the Wire" (1969)
7. Susan Aglukark, "O Siem" (1996)
8. Spoons, "Nova Heart" (1985)
9. Jane Siberry, "Mimi on the Beach" (1987)
10. Rheostatics, "Claire" (1996)
11. Blue Rodeo, "5 Days in May" (1993)
12. Holly Cole, "I Can See Clearly Now" (1995)
13. Diana Krall, "Peel Me a Grape" (1998)
14. Loreena McKennitt, "The Mummer's Dance" (1997)
15. Daniel Lanois, "Still Water" (1990)
16. Ashley MacIsaac, "Sleepy Maggie" (1993)
17. Great Big Sea, "Ordinary Day" (1997)
18. Moxy Früvous, "King of Spain" (1994)
19. Barenaked Ladies, "One Week" (1998)

== 2006 release ==
=== Disc One ===
1. Rush, "Closer to the Heart"* (1979)
2. Bachman–Turner Overdrive, "Hey You" (1975)
3. Heart, "Dreamboat Annie" (1975)
4. The Stampeders, "Sweet City Woman" * (1972)
5. Burton Cummings, "My Own Way to Rock" (1974)
6. Nick Gilder, "Hot Child in the City"* (1978)
7. Lighthouse, "Pretty Lady" (1973)
8. The Guess Who, "Hand Me Down World" (1971)
9. Terry Jacks, "Seasons in the Sun"* (1973)
10. Streetheart, "Under My Thumb" (1988)
11. Bruce Cockburn, "Lovers in a Dangerous Time" (1984)
12. Murray McLauchlan, "Farmer's Song"* (1974)
13. Dan Hill, "Sometimes When We Touch"* (1978)
14. Edward Bear, "Last Song"* (1972)
15. The Poppy Family, "Which Way You Goin' Billy?"* (1969)
16. Anne Murray, "Snowbird"* (1968)
17. Paul Anka, "(You're) Having My Baby" (1970)
18. Patsy Gallant, "From New York To L.A." (1976)

* Songs also on the 25th anniversary box set.

=== Disc Two ===
1. Nickelback, "How You Remind Me" (2001)
2. Finger Eleven, "One Thing" (2003)
3. Default, "Wasting My Time" (2001)
4. Our Lady Peace, "Innocent" (2002)
5. Simple Plan, "Perfect" (2003)
6. Sum 41, "Pieces" (2005)
7. Billy Talent, "Try Honesty" (2004)
8. Sloan, "If It Feels Good Do It" (2001)
9. Buck 65, "Wicked and Weird" (2003)
10. Broken Social Scene, "Cause = Time" (2005)
11. Theory of a Deadman, "Nothing Could Come Between Us" (2002)
12. Hawksley Workman, "Jealous of Your Cigarette" (2004)
13. Alexisonfire, "Pulmonary Archery" (2004)
14. Matthew Good Band, "Load Me Up" (2000)
15. Sam Roberts, "Brother Down" (2002)
16. Treble Charger, "American Psycho" (2000)
17. Feist, "Gatekeeper" (2003)
18. The Tragically Hip, "Bobcaygeon" (1999)

=== Disc Three ===
1. Avril Lavigne, "Complicated" (2002)
2. Chad Kroeger & Josey Scott, "Hero" (2002)
3. Barenaked Ladies, "Pinch Me" (2000)
4. k-os, "Crabbuckit" (2004)
5. Nelly Furtado, "I'm Like a Bird" (2000)
6. Jacksoul, "Can't Stop" (2000)
7. Keshia Chanté, "Bad Boy" (2004)
8. Marie-Élaine Thibert, "Le ciel est à moi" (2005)
9. Remy Shand, "Take a Message" (2002)
10. Swollen Members, "Lady Venom" (1999)
11. David Usher, "Black Black Heart" (2000)
12. The Philosopher Kings, "Hurts To Love You" (1996)
13. Wilfred Le Bouthillier, "Je ferais tout" (2003)
14. Fefe Dobson, "Take Me Away" (2004)
15. Rufus Wainwright, "Cigarettes & Chocolate Milk" (2005)
16. Amanda Marshall, "Everybody's Got a Story" (2001)
17. Shania Twain, "Forever and for Always" (2003)
18. Bryan Adams, "Open Road" (2004)

=== Disc Four ===
1. Sarah McLachlan, "World on Fire" (2004)
2. Céline Dion, "A New Day Has Come" (2002)
3. Jann Arden, "Never Mind" (2002)
4. Blue Rodeo, "Bulletproof" (2002)
5. Sarah Harmer, "Basement Apartment" (1997)
6. Ron Sexsmith, "Whatever it Takes" (2004)
7. k.d. lang, "Helpless" (2004)
8. Diana Krall, "The Look of Love" (2005)
9. Michael Bublé, "Can't Help Falling in Love" (2004)
10. Holly Cole, "Something Cool" (2003)
11. Matt Dusk, "Two Shots of Happy, One Shot of Sad" (2005)
12. Susan Aglukark, "Big Feeling" (2003)
13. Terri Clark, "No Fear" (2000)
14. Carolyn Dawn Johnson, "I Don't Want You to Go" (2002)
15. The Rankins, "Bells" (2001)
16. The Wilkinsons, "Jimmy's Got a Girlfriend" (2000)
17. Jesse Cook, "Fall at Your Feet" (2000)
18. Great Big Sea, "Consequence Free" (1998)
