= Fubar: The Album =

2003 soundtrack album

Soundtrack album to FUBAR: The Movie by various artists
- Released: November 25, 2003
- Genre: Punk rock Heavy metal Hard rock
- Length: 1:02:11
- Label: Phantom Records (Australia); EMI Music; Aquarius Records (Canada)

Fubar: The Album is the companion record/soundtrack to the 2002 Canadian film FUBAR: The Movie.

The protagonists of the film are two head bangers; for the album, several contemporary Canadian rock bands were asked to record cover versions of Canadian heavy metal and hard rock hits from that era to complement the film. Artists who participated were diverse, ranging from major acts such as Sum 41 to lesser-known artists such as heavy-metal veteran Thor and indie rock notables The New Pornographers. Also heavily featured was the fictional band Creeper.

The album also includes two non-Canadian songs (Sweet's "Blockbuster" and Girlschool's "C'Mon Let's Go") presented in their original versions. The songs are also interspersed with bits of dialogue from the film. The covers are not actually heard in the film itself; only the original and non-Canadian songs appear in the film.

== Track listing ==
The 27 track soundtrack consists of songs, cover songs where noted (original artist is noted as well) and short dialogue skits where noted.

1. Dialogue: "Turn Up the Good, Turn Down the Suck" – 0:08
2. "Rock You" (Helix) – Pain for Pleasure/Sum 41 – 3:12
3. Dialogue: "Guidance Counsellor" – 0:23
4. "Heavy Metal Shuffle" (Kick Axe) – Gob – 2:55
5. "Your Daddy Don't Know" (Toronto) – The New Pornographers – 3:05
6. Dialogue: "Where's Tron?" – 0:13
7. "Blockbuster" – Sweet – 2:12
8. Dialogue: "It Wasn't So Much the Thing..." – 0:08
9. "Roller" (April Wine) – Treble Charger – 3:07
10. Dialogue: "Shotgun a Few Beers" – 0:28
11. "In the Mood" (Rush) – Sloan – 3:39
12. Dialogue: "A Band Called Creeper" – 0:05
13. "Handsome Hose" – Creeper – 5:29
14. Dialogue: "You Can't Just Back it Up!" – 0:22
15. "C'Mon Let's Go" – Girlschool – 3:23
16. Dialogue: "Giver: Plan B" – 0:14
17. "Raise a Little Hell" (Trooper) – Grim Skunk – 4:01
18. "Four Wheel Drive" (Bachman–Turner Overdrive) – The English Teeth – 4:17
19. "Garden Gate of Evil" – Creeper – 1:25
20. "Garden of Evil" – Creeper – 3:15
21. Dialogue: "Fingerbang" – 0:35
22. "The Kid is Hot Tonight" (Loverboy) – Chixdiggit – 2:54
23. Dialogue: "I Got Attacked by a Hawk" – 0:23
24. "FUBAR Is a Super Rocker" – Thor – 2:45
25. "Eyes of a Stranger" (Payolas) – Breach of Trust – 4:50
26. "Hey Hey My My" (Neil Young) – NoMeansNo – 5:33
27. "Rock and Roll is My Guitar" – Creeper – 7:10
