= Holly Woods =

American rock singer (born 1953)

- Birth name: Anne Elizabeth Woods
- Born: August 4, 1953 (age 71)
- Origin: Durham, North Carolina, USA
- Genres: Rock, hard rock
- Occupation: Singer
- Instrument: Vocals
- Years active: 1977–present
- Labels: Solid Gold Records; Cyclone Records
- Website: www.cyclonerecords.ca

Anne Elizabeth "Holly" Woods (born August, 4 1953) is an American rock singer whose notable works include five albums in the rock band Toronto.

== Biography ==
A native of Durham, North Carolina, Woods moved from San Francisco to Toronto in the mid-1970s, after fronting local bands Sass, and then Gambler. She initially performed in Toronto as Annie Woods and Shivers. She was introduced to Brian Allen in 1977 and, with the addition of Scott Kreyer, Nick Costello and Jimmy Fox (all native New Yorkers), plus Sheron Alton, the band Toronto was formed.

After a string of Top 40 hits and nearly 700,000 albums sold, Toronto disbanded in 1985. In 1986, Woods and Kreyer regrouped and recorded a new album which was never released. In 2007, "lost" masters were discovered and released as the eight-song album Live It Up! These songs were recorded in Atlanta, in 1986, with producer Sonny Limbo and bandmate Kreyer.

== Discography ==
=== Albums ===
1. Lookin' for Trouble (1980) as Toronto
2. Head On (1981) as Toronto
3. Get It on Credit (1982) as Toronto
4. Girls' Night Out (1983) as Toronto
5. Greatest Hits (1984) as Toronto
6. Assault and Flattery (1984) as Holly Woods & Toronto
7. Live It Up! (2007) as Holly Woods

=== Singles ===
- 1980 - "Even the Score" [CAN #44] [CHUM #14]
- 1980 - "Lookin' for Trouble" [CAN #73]
- 1982 - "Your Daddy Don't Know" [CAN #3] [CHUM #2] [US #77]
- 1982 - "Start Tellin' the Truth" [CAN #15] [CHUM #4]
- 1983 - "Girls Night Out" [CAN #14] [CHUM #19]
- 1983 - "All I Need" [CAN #38] [CHUM #25]
- 1984 - "Ready to Make Up" [CAN #33] [CHUM #23]
- 1984 - "New Romance" [CAN #26] [CHUM #20]
