= Copperpenny =

Canadian rock band

- Origin: Kitchener, Ontario
- Genre: Rock
- Years active: 1965–1978
- Labels: Columbia Records; RCA Records; Sweet Plum Records/London Records; Capitol Records
- Past members: Kenny Hollis; Rich Wamil; Bill Mononen; Bill (Dal) Dalrymple; Ron Hiller (bass); Blake Barrett; Vern McDonald; Paul Reibling; Bert Hamer; Blake Barrett; Wayne Evans; Brad Fowles; Ron Hiller; Brian Russell; Al Mix; Paul Zaza; Barry Keane; Eric Robertson; Mark Stephen Gendel; Bill Mair; Jim Minas

Copperpenny was a Canadian rock band from Kitchener, Ontario. They were formed in 1965 by Kenny Hollis and Rich Wamil, and were originally known as the Penny Farthings, to reflect the British Invasion. Not long after their formation they adopted Copperpenny as their new moniker, after a B-side by Toronto band The Paupers.

In 1968, the release of "Nice Girl" on Columbia Records garnered the group moderate success. They soon switched to RCA and enjoyed a minor hit with "Stop (Wait A Minute)." However, it was not until after they moved to Sweet Plum Records, a division of London Records, that they enjoyed their first major success.

"You're Still The One" was the band's first mainstream hit and the follow-up, 1973's "Sitting on a Poor Man's Throne," was recorded in Dearborn, Michigan, with Richard Becker.

Copperpenny continued to record as they toured the United States with Led Zeppelin, Bob Seger, The Guess Who and Uriah Heep.

1975 saw them sign on with Capitol Records. They made several appearances on television shows such as "Keith Hampshire's Music Machine". Copperpenny even had a short-lived variety show that launched the career of a then unknown magician named Doug Henning.

During this period, they had continued success with the singles "Disco Queen", "Good Time Sally" and "Suspicious Love". They toured Canada in support of the Fuse album opening for the Swedish band Blue Swede. Their touring line-up included Mark Stephen Gendel on guitar, Bill Mair on bass and Jim Minas on Drums.

By the time their final record, Fuse, was released, most of the original members had already left the band. Rich Wamil supported the effort as Rich Wamil & Copperpenny, but the remaining band split up in 1978.

Co-founder Kenny Hollis went on to have a successful solo career with the single "Goin' Hollywood". He would later become PR manager at Lulu's Roadhouse in Kitchener, Ontario, with several Copperpenny reunion shows throughout the 1980s. Hollis died on July 12, 2002, after suffering a heart attack.

Ron Hiller spent 1979-1981 in a Toronto-based contemporary gospel music band called Sonlight. They did the local Toronto church scene, and Kitchener-Waterloo, as well as summer gigs in Muskoka, Ontario. Hiller subsequently earned his teaching degree and, since 1989, has maintained a full-time career as children's entertainer, singer, guitarist, recording artist, performer and educator under the name RONNO.

== Band members ==
circa 1968-1969

- Rich Wamil – vocals, keyboards
- Kenny Hollis – vocals
- Vern McDonald – guitar
- Paul Reibling – bass
- Bert Hamer – drums

1970 to 1972

- Rich Wamil– vocals, keyboards
- Kenny Hollis – vocals
- Bill Mononen – guitar
- Bill (Dal) Dalrymple – bass
- Blake Barrett – drums, percussion
- Wayne Evans - bass
- Brad Fowles - drums

1973

- Rich Wamil– vocals, keyboards
- Kenny Hollis – vocals
- Bill Mononen – guitar
- Ron Hiller – bass
- Blake Barrett – drums, percussion

1975

- Rich Wamil – vocals, keyboards
- Brian Russell – guitar
- Al Mix – guitar
- Paul Zaza – bass
- Barry Keane – drums
- Eric Robertson - keyboards

1975 (Touring Band)

- Rich Wamil - vocals, keyboards & guitar
- Mark Stephen Gendel - guitar
- Bill Mair - bass & vocals
- Jim Minas - drums & vocals

Donald K. Donald Tour Schedule (1975) BLUE SWEDE (Blablus) & Copperpenny - Capitol Records

- Friday, May 2 - Lord Beaverbrook Arena, Saint John, NB
- Saturday, May 3 - Moncton Colliseum, Moncton, NB
- Sunday, May 4 - Fredericton Playhouse, Fredericton, NB
- Monday, May 5 - Bathurst Arena, Bathurst, NB
- Tuesday, May 6 - Sinclair Rink, Newcastle, NB
- Wednesday, May 7 - Simmons Sport Centre, Charlottetown, PEI
- Thursday, May 8 - New Glasgow Stadium, New Glasgow, NS
- Friday, May 9 - Sydney Academy, Sydney, NS
- Saturday, May 10 - Halifax Forum, Halifax, NS
- Sunday, May 11 - Bridgewater Memorial Arena, Bridgewater, NS
- Monday, May 12 - Travel Day
- Tuesday, May 13 - Peterborough Memorial Gardens, Peterborough, ON
- Wednesday, May 14 - Capital Theatre, Cornwall, ON
- Thursday, May 15 - Travel Day
- Friday, May 16 - Sault memorial Gardens, Sault Ste. Marie, ON
- Saturday, May 17 - North Bay memorial Gardens, North Bay, ON
- Sunday, May 18 - Sudbury Arena, Sudbury, ON
- Monday, May 19 - MacIntyre Community Centre, Timmins, ON
- Tuesday, May 20 - Kirkland Lake Arena, Kirkland Lake, ON
- Wednesday, May 21 - Travel Day
- Thursday, May 22 - Ontario Place, Toronto, ON
- Friday, May 23 - Travel Day
- Saturday, May 24 - Key to Bala, Bala, ON

== Discography ==
=== LPs ===
Year	Title	Label
1970	Copperpenny	RCA Victor
1973	Sitting on a Poor Man's Throne	Sweet Plum
1975	Fuse	Capitol Records

=== Singles ===
Year	Title	Chart Positions	Album
Year	Title	CAN	Album
1968	"Beezel Bug"	—	N/A
1968	"Nice Girl"	77	N/A
1968	"Baby Gives Me Everything"	—	N/A
1969	"Just a Sweet Little Thing"	—	N/A
1970	"Stop (Wait a Minute)"	67	Copperpenny
1972	"You're Still the One"	26	N/A
1972	"Call Me"	—	N/A
1973	"Sitting on a Poor Man's Throne"	14	Sitting on a Poor Man's Throne
1973	"Rock 'n' Roll Boogie Woogie and Wine"	62	N/A
1973	"Where Is the Answer"	76	N/A
1974	"Help Your Brother"	82	N/A
1974	"Summertime"	—	N/A
1975	"Disco Queen"	56	Fuse
1975	"Good Time Sally"	67	Fuse
1975	"Suspicious Love"	49	Fuse
1975	"Going Down to Miami"	—	Fuse
1975	"Run Rudolph Run"	—	N/A
1976	"I Love You"	—	N/A
"—" denotes releases that did not chart or were not released in that country.
