= Live It Up! (Holly Woods album) =

Studio album by Holly Woods
- Released: 2007
- Recorded: 1985
- Genre: Rock
- Label: Cyclone Records
- Producer: Sonny Limbo

Holly Woods chronology
Assault & Flattery (1984)	Live It Up! (2007)

Live It Up! is Holly Woods's final album, released in 2007. The album was recorded in 1985, but the was shelved after Toronto's label, Solid Gold Records, went into receivership.

Two of the members, Holly Woods and Scott Kreyer, regrouped and continued on to a studio in Atlanta to record new tracks with producer Sonny Limbo. The tapes were shelved for over twenty years due to the preceding reputation of Solid Gold Records and subsequent death of Limbo.

== Track listing ==
1. "Live It Up!"
2. "Only for the Moment"
3. "Until We Change"
4. "Win"
5. "Where Are We Now"
6. "Hold On"
7. "The Fall"
8. "Shimmy Shake"

== Musicians ==
- Holly Woods - lead vocals
- Scott Kreyer - keyboards, backing vocals
