= Greatest Hits (Toronto album) =

The Greatest Hits

Greatest hits album by Toronto
- Released: 1984
- Genre: Rock
- Length: 46:44
- Label: Solid Gold Records

Toronto chronology
| Girls' Night Out (1983) | The Greatest Hits (1984) | Assault & Flattery (1984) |

Professional ratings
Review scores
| Source | Rating |
|---|---|
| Allmusic | 4.5/5 stars |

The Greatest Hits is a compilation album by the Canadian Rock band Toronto, released in 1984. The album features two new studio tracks: "Andrea" and "Me Generation". The CD release features the bonus track "What About Love", as well as music videos for three songs.

== Track listing ==
=== Side 1 ===
1. "Your Daddy Don't Know" - 5:06
2. "Lookin' for Trouble" - 3:15
3. "Enough Is Enough" - 4:24
4. "Start Tellin' the Truth" - 3:29
5. "Even the Score" - 4:10
6. "Andrea" - 3:19

=== Side 2 ===
7. "Ready to Make Up" - 2:59
8. "All I Need" - 4:07
9. "Silver Screen" - 3:30
10. "Girls' Night Out" - 4:34
11. "Head On" - 3:56
12. "Me Generation" - 3:55

=== CD edition bonus tracks ===
13. "What About Love" - 3:58
- "Your Daddy Don't Know" (video)
- "Start Tellin' the Truth" (video)
- "When Can I See You Again?" (video)

== Musicians ==
- Holly Woods - lead vocals
- Sheron Alton - guitar, backing vocals
- Brian Allen - guitar, lead vocals
- Scott Kreyer - keyboards, backing vocals
- Nick Costello - bass guitar
- Gary LaLonde - bass guitar
- Mike Gingrich - bass guitar
- Jimmy Fox - drums
- Barry Connors - drums
