= Assault & Flattery =

Studio album by Toronto
- Released: October 1984
- Recorded: Eastern Sound, Toronto, Ontario, Canada
- Genre: Rock
- Length: 37:08
- Label: Solid Gold Records
- Producer: Mike Flicker, Tim McCauley, Holly Woods, Scott Kreyer, Brian MacLeod

Toronto chronology
The Greatest Hits (1984)	Assault & Flattery (1984)	Live It Up! (2007)

Singles from Assault & Flattery
- 1. "New Romance" Released: 1984

Professional ratings
Review scores
Source	Rating
Kerrang!	(mixed)

Assault & Flattery is Toronto's sixth and final album, released in 1984. The album features only two original band members, Anne "Holly" Woods and Scott Kreyer. Released as "Holly Woods & Toronto" which hints at Holly's increasing control and autonomy in the band at this time. The album was produced by Mike Flicker who produced five albums for Heart - the band Toronto are most often compared to. The CD release includes the bonus track "Where Are We Now?" - which was also performed by Holly herself, as a solo artist, on her CD Live It Up!.

== Track listing ==
=== Side 1 ===
1. "New Romance" (Holly Knight, Anton Fig) - 3:35
2. "Kerry Anne" (Holly Woods, Scott Kreyer, Mike Gingrich) - 4:43
3. "Sometimes Change" (Woods, Kreyer) - 4:06
4. "Look What's Showing Through" (Eddie Schwartz) - 4:41
5. "Bang Your Head" (Woods, Kreyer, Gingrich, Jeff Gilhart) - 3:42

=== Side 2 ===
6. "Desperation" (Woods, Kreyer, Paul Hanna, Daryl Alvaro, Gingrich) - 4:56
7. "Assault and Flattery" (Woods, Kreyer, Tim McCauley, Gingrich) - 3:39
8. "Cats & Dogs (Stealin')" (Woods, Kreyer, Gingrich) - 3:25
9. "No More Cliches" (Woods, Brian MacLeod) - 4:21

=== CD version bonus track ===
10. "Where Are We Now?"

== Personnel ==
=== Band members ===
- Holly Woods - lead and backing vocals, co-producer
- Scott Kreyer - keyboards, co-producer
- Marty Walsh - lead and rhythm guitars
- Mike Gingrich - bass guitar
- Paul Hanna - drums

=== Additional musicians ===
- Daryl Alvaro - additional guitars
- Tim McCauley - additional keyboards, programming, producer
- Phil Kenzie - saxophone
- Lenny Castro - percussion
- John Coury - backing vocals and vocal arrangements
- Cele Bullard, Nick Cerro, Liz Lausanne - backing vocals
- Darby Mills - vocals on the duet "Cats & Dogs (Stealin')"
- Brian MacLeod - lead guitar on "Cats & Dogs (Stealin')", producer and mixing on track 9

=== Production ===
- Mike Flicker - producer
- Tony Bongiovi - mixing
