= Tom Bagley (musician) =

Canadian musician

Tom Bagley (born 1965), stage name Jackson Phibes, is a Canadian artist, guitarist and horror rock composer. He is known for his work with the band Forbidden Dimension.

== Early life ==
Bagley was born in Calgary, Alberta, and graduated from the Alberta College of Art and Design in 1988

== Career ==
Bagley performed with the band Color Me Psycho. Beginning in 1988, he founded the band Forbidden Dimension, taking on songwriting, lead vocals and lead guitar. In 1999, as Jackson Phibes, he released a solo EP, Old Devil Moon.

Bagley created cover art for a number of Canadian rock and punk albums, including all of the art for his own Forbidden Dimension releases. and covers for bands Chixdiggit, Huevos Rancheros and the Fuzz Kings.

Bagley also performed in the garage rock/punk band The English Teeth, with Adam Kamis and Forbidden Dimension bandmates Mark Igglesdon and Craig Evans. This band recorded a version of Bachman-Turner Overdrive's tune "Four Wheel Drive", which became part of the soundtrack for the film FUBAR, as well as the accompanying album.
