= Toronto (band) =

Canadian rock band

- Origin: Toronto, Ontario, Canada
- Genres: Rock, hard rock, AOR
- Years active: 1979–1984
- Label: Solid Gold Records
- Past members: Annie "Holly" Woods; Brian Allen; Sheron Alton; Nick Costello; Jimmy Fox; Scott Kreyer

Toronto was a Canadian rock band formed in the late 1970s in Toronto, Ontario, and perhaps best known for the top-ten Canadian hit "Your Daddy Don't Know" (which also cracked the U.S. pop charts), and for writing and performing the original version of "What About Love," a song that would later become a top-ten comeback single for the band Heart.

== Biography ==
The band started when drummer Jim Fox introduced guitarist Brian Allen to singer Annie "Holly" Woods The line-up was initially rounded out by guitarist/backing vocalist Sheron Alton, keyboardist Scott Kreyer and bassist Nick Costello, but shifted constantly through the band's life.

Toronto's first album, Lookin' for Trouble, was released in 1980. Its lead single "Even The Score" was a minor hit, just missing the Canadian Top 40. Head On (1981) followed, after which Costello and Fox left the band, and were replaced by Gary LaLonde (later of Honeymoon Suite) and Barry Connors (later of Coney Hatch) although neither Connors or Lalonde were official royalty-bearing members. The band was nominated for a Juno in 1981 for "Most Promising Group of the Year" along with Loverboy, Martha & the Muffins, Red Rider and Powder Blues Band (winner).

This sextet recorded Get It on Credit in 1982. Its lead single "Your Daddy Don't Know" reached top 5 in Canada, and No. 77 in the US. It remains their best-known hit. "Your Daddy Don't Know" was nominated for a Juno Award in 1983 for Composer of the Year (the song was written by Geoff Iwamoto and Michael Roth). Lalonde was then replaced by Mike Gingrich for 1983's Girls' Night Out in 1983. This album also received attention, as did the band's Greatest Hits album of 1984. In 1984, Holly Woods was nominated for a Juno for "Female Vocalist of the Year" along with Dalbello, Shari Ulrich and Anne Murray (winner).

There were subsequently several exits and entrances in 1984 and 1985, with founding members Allen and Alton leaving, along with drummer Connors. The band rechristened themselves Holly Woods and Toronto and subsequest versions included Marty Walsh (guitars), Daryl Alvaro (guitars), and Paul Hanna (drums). In 1985, the revamped sextet released their final album, Assault and Flattery. It featured the single "New Romance", written by Holly Knight and Anton Fig.

In 1985, the band was forced to break up when Solid Gold Records filed for bankruptcy protection. Woods and Kreyer ended up relocating to Atlanta, where they went into Lowery Studios to record a solo album by Woods. However, the album was shelved for over 20 years, until Cyclone Records acquired the rights to the "lost" masters and released the album in 2007.

== Overview ==
The band scored a handful of hit singles in Canada during the early 1980s, including "Your Daddy Don't Know", "Start Tellin' the Truth", and "Girls' Night Out". "Your Daddy Don't Know" was covered by The New Pornographers for the 2003 film soundtrack FUBAR: The Album.

The song "What About Love" was recorded by Toronto during the Get It on Credit sessions. It was written by band members Alton and Allen along with outside collaborator Jim Vallance. However, the rest of the band elected not to release the song. In 1985, the song was offered to Heart, who turned "What About Love" into an international top-10 hit. Toronto's original version was released in 2002 as a bonus track on the CD reissues of several of their albums.

== Discography ==
=== Albums ===
1. Lookin' for Trouble (1980) as Toronto [US No. 185]
2. Head On (1981) as Toronto
3. Get It on Credit (1982) as Toronto [US No. 162]
4. Girls' Night Out (1983) as Toronto
5. Greatest Hits (1984) as Toronto
6. Assault & Flattery (1984) as Holly Woods & Toronto
7. Live It Up! (2007) as Holly Woods

=== Singles ===
Year	Title	CAN RPM	CAN CHUM	US
1980	"Even the Score"	44	14	104
1980	"5035"	–	–	–
1980	"Lookin' for Trouble"	73	–	–
1980	"Still Talkin' 'Bout Love"	–	–	–
1981	"Silver Screen"	–	–	–
1981	"Enough Is Enough"	–	–	–
1982	"Your Daddy Don't Know"	5	2	77
1982	"Start Tellin' the Truth"	15	4	–
1982	"Don't Walk Away"	–	–	–
1982	"Get It on Credit"	–	–	–
1983	"Girls Night Out"	14	19	–
1983	"All I Need"	38	25	–
1984	"Ready to Make Up"	33	23	–
1984	"New Romance"	26	20	–
