= Sacred Arias: The Home Video =

Andrea Bocelli: The Home Video
- Starring: Andrea Bocelli
- Distributed by: Pilips
- Release date: 20 June 2000
- Running time: 177 minutes
- Country: Italy
- Languages: English, Italian

Sacred Arias: The Home Video is the second DVD released by Italian tenor, Andrea Bocelli.

It was filmed in the Roman church of Santa Maria Sopra Minerva, in Rome, in 1999, where he gave a concert conducted by Myung-whun Chung, singing the arias of his previous album, Sacred Arias.

The PBS Great Performances program was nominated for an Emmy Award for Outstanding Classical Music-Dance Program during the 2000 Emmy awards. The DVD was certified Gold in the US by the Recording Industry Association of America.

Sacred Arias: Special Edition, a CD/DVD package, was released on 4 October 2003, containing both the album and the DVD as a bonus.
