= Lulu's Roadhouse =

Nightclub and live music venue in Kitchener, Ontario

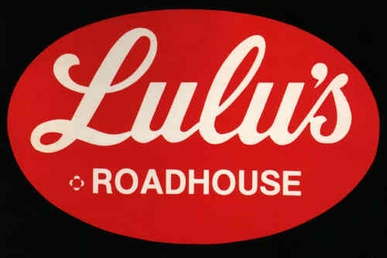
- Interactive map of Lulu's Roadhouse

Restaurant information
- Established: April 3, 1984
- Closed: April 8, 2000
- Previous owners: Karl Magid; John Ireland; Benn Spiegel
- Location: 4263 King St. E., Kitchener, Canada
- Coordinates: 43.4088°N 80.4000°W
- Seating capacity: 3,000

Lulu's Roadhouse was a nightclub and live music venue in Kitchener, Ontario, Canada at 4263 King Street East. It was known as having the world's longest bar in the Guinness World Records book. The club was opened by Karl Magid in April 1984. The 75,000 sq ft (7,000 m^{2}) club that held 3,000 people frequently brought in musical acts, especially rock artists from the 50s to the 70s. The club changed owners in 1989 and went bankrupt in 1992 following a recession. It was revived under new ownership, and began to bring in newer artists, from the 70s to 90s. The club closed in April 2000.

== History ==
Karl Magid from Toronto was a real-estate broker, entrepreneur, and developer. Before opening the Roadhouse, Magid opened three smaller Lulu's in Kitchener and one in Belleville. For example, Lulu's Dine & Dance opened in 1978, and was sold to other owners in 1981. Magid discovered the former K-Mart site that would eventually become the Roadhouse on December 15, 1983. Then, he created the club's floorplan and decided he would open the club in 100 days. The Roadhouse was opened on April 3, 1984. Located off of Highway 8 at 4263 King St. E, the club was 75,000 sq ft (7,000 m^{2}) and held 3,000 people.

The Roadhouse was entered into the Guinness World Records for having a 103.6 m (340 ft) long bar. It has also been described as the largest nightclub in Canada. The club gained a reputation as a "vibrant, artist-friendly free-for-all" and was noted for its unique atmosphere. Many artists played there, especially those from the early era of rock (the 50s to 70s), such as Chuck Berry, James Brown, Rick Nelson, Wilson Pickett, The Righteous Brothers, Ray Charles, and more. There was also a house band. The club drew 10,000 people per week, and would sell over 25,000 drinks on a busy night. In 1985, the Roadhouse had annual sales of CA$7 million (or adjusted for inflation, CA$18 million).

Magid sold the club to John Ireland in 1989. Following a recession, it went bankrupt in 1992. Under new ownership by Benn Spiegel, the club was revived. It focused more on concerts, pivoting to hard rock music from the 70s to 90s. Some examples of artists who played include April Wine, Ted Nugent, Styx, Black Sabbath, Foreigner, and Bad Company. Around this time, the longest bar was cut in half for improved traffic flow, causing the club to lose its world record.

The club's reputation was worsened after an anti-smoking bylaw from the region, a liquor licence hearing, and a few events that had "drinking and violence problems". Lulu's closed down on April 8, 2000, then owned by Spiegel, the club's third owner. Magid died in 2001, at the time still active as a real-estate developer.
