= Get It on Credit =

Studio album by Toronto
- Released: 1982
- Genres: Hard rock, pop rock
- Length: 38:19
- Labels: Network, Solid Gold Records
- Producer: Steve Smith

Toronto chronology
Head On (1981)	Get It on Credit (1982)	Girls' Night Out (1983)

Professional ratings
Review scores
Source	Rating
AllMusic	2/5 stars

Get It on Credit is the third studio album by Canadian rock band Toronto, released in 1982. Both original members, Nick Costello and Jim Fox, left the band prior to this release, to be replaced by Gary LaLonde and Barry Connors respectively. LaLonde later joined Honeymoon Suite, while Connors went on to work with Toronto-based quartet Coney Hatch.

The CD release features two bonus tracks that did not make the cut for the original album of 1982: "What About Love" and "Across the Border". "What About Love" was later recorded by Heart in 1985 and would become a top 10 hit on the Billboard charts.

== Track listing ==
=== Side 1 ===
1. "Break Down the Barricades" (Brian Allen, Holly Woods, Scott Kreyer, Sheron Alton) - 5:08
2. "Your Daddy Don't Know" (Geoffrey Iwamoto, Michael Roth) - 3:17
3. "Start Tellin' the Truth" (Allen) - 4:27
4. "You're a Mystery to Me" (Allen, Jim Vallance, Kreyer) - 3:30
5. "Don't Walk Away" (Allen, Vallance, Kreyer) - 4:12

=== Side 2 ===
6. "Get It on Credit" (Allen) - 3:19
7. "Sick and Tired" (Woods, Kreyer) - 3:00
8. "Ya Love ta Love" (Allen) - 4:09
9. "Why Can't We Talk?" (Allen) - 3:34
10. "Run for Your Life" (Allen, Woods, Kreyer, Alton) - 4:38

=== CD issue bonus tracks ===
11. "What About Love" (Allen, Vallance, Alton) - 3:58
12. "Across the Border" (Allen, Woods, Kreyer, Alton) - 3:55

== Personnel ==
=== Band members ===
- Holly Woods - lead vocals
- Sheron Alton - rhythm guitar, backing vocals
- Brian Allen - lead guitar
- Scott Kreyer - keyboards, backing vocals
- Gary LaLonde - bass guitar
- Barry Connors - drums

=== Production ===
- Steve Smith - producer, engineer
- Jim Frank - engineer
- Mike Baskerville - assistant engineer
- Bernie Grundman - mastering
- Jim Vallance - arrangements

== Charts ==
Chart (1982)	Peak position
Canada Top Albums/CDs (RPM)	8
US Billboard 200	162

== Certifications ==
Region	Certification	Certified units/sales
Canada (Music Canada)	Platinum	100,000^{^}
^{^} Shipments figures based on certification alone.
