= What About Love =

Single by Heart

from the album Heart
- B-side: "Heart of Darkness"
- Written: 1982
- Released: 1985
- Genre: Hard rock
- Length: 3:41
- Label: Capitol
- Songwriters: Brian Allen; Sheron Alton; Jim Vallance
- Producer: Ron Nevison

Heart singles chronology
"Allies" (1983)	"What About Love" (1985)	"Never" (1985)

Music video
- "What About Love" on YouTube

"What About Love" is a song originally recorded by Canadian rock band Toronto in 1982. It was later recorded by American rock band Heart in 1985 and was released as the first single from the band's self-titled album, Heart. The band's "comeback" single, it was the first Heart track to reach the top 40 on the Billboard Hot 100 in three years, and their first top 10 hit in five. The song was also their first hit single on their new record label, Capitol Records. Grace Slick and Mickey Thomas, co-lead vocalists of Starship at the time, provide additional background vocals on the song.

== Background ==
The song was originally recorded in 1982 by Canadian rock group Toronto, of which songwriters Sheron Alton and Brian Allen were members. (The other songwriter, Jim Vallance, was not a member of Toronto, though he played drums on Toronto's recording of the song.) However, the rest of the band elected not to release the song on their album Get It on Credit, and the frustration Allen and Alton faced in being unable to convince their bandmates to feature this and other material on Toronto's albums led to their departure from the group.

Later, Michael McCarty at ATV Music Publishing was reviewing his song catalogue when he came across "What About Love". He offered the song to Heart, who turned it into a worldwide hit. Toronto's original version remained commercially unreleased until 2002, when it appeared as a bonus cut on the CDs Get It on Credit and Toronto: The Greatest Hits.

== Reception ==
The song's sound marked a considerable change in the musical direction for Heart, moving from the hard rock and folk rock of their earlier work to a more polished, power ballad sound. "What About Love" received extensive airplay on MTV and returned Heart to the top 10 of the U.S. Billboard Hot 100 for the first time in five years, peaking at No. 10.

The song peaked at No. 14 on the UK Singles Chart upon its re-release in 1988. Exclusively in its UK release, "What About Love" was also featured in an extended version on 12" and CD single versions.

Cash Box said of the single that it "retains the punch of [Heart's] hard rock tinged mid-’70s successes with a new vocal and melodic pliability," also saying that it has "less emphasis on guitar solos and more songwriting focus."

The song's chorus was featured in a series of Swiffer WetJet TV commercials from late 2010 into the following year. The campaign followed a series of previous Swiffer commercials using popular songs of the 1970s and 1980s.

== Personnel ==
=== Heart ===
- Ann Wilson – vocals
- Nancy Wilson – lead guitar, background vocals
- Howard Leese – lead guitar, keyboards, background vocals
- Mark Andes – bass guitar
- Denny Carmassi – drums

=== Additional musicians ===
- Peter Wolf – synthesizers
- Mickey Thomas – background vocals
- Grace Slick – background vocals
- Lynn Wilson – background vocals
- Holly Knight – keyboards

== Charts ==
=== Weekly charts ===
Chart (1985–1986)	Peak position
Australia (Kent Music Report)	28
Canada Top Singles (RPM)	8
Canada Adult Contemporary (RPM)	3
US Billboard Hot 100	10
US Mainstream Rock (Billboard)	3
US Cash Box Top 100	17
West Germany (GfK)	43

Chart (1988)	Peak position
Europe (European Hot 100 Singles)	49
Ireland (IRMA)	12
UK Singles (Official Charts)	14

Chart (2008)	Peak position
Canadian Digital Songs (Billboard)	37

=== Year-end charts ===
Chart (1985)	Position
Canada Top Singles (RPM)	75
US Billboard Hot 100	87
US Mainstream Rock (Billboard)	25

== Cover versions and samples ==
- Mari Hamada covered the song on her 1985 album Blue Revolution.
- American Idol finalist Melissa McGhee recorded the song for the 2006 compilation album American Idol Season 5: Encores. Janell Wheeler performed the song in season 9 of the series. Season 11's Erika Van Pelt sang the song during the top 12 Girls night. In season 12, Amber Holcomb sang it during the Top 7's Rock week.
- Rick Ross samples "What About Love" in his song "Shot to the Heart."
- Lil Wayne samples "What About Love" in his song "Something You Forgot."
- On the TV show Pussycat Dolls Present: Girlicious, finalist Chrystina Sayers performed the song in the series finale, which eventually leads to her making the final group Girlicious.
- Rytmus samples "What About Love" in his 2009 song "Na Toto Som Cakal" from his album Král.
- Kelly Clarkson covered the song as part of her 2012 Stronger Tour, performing the song during a Boston, Massachusetts appearance.
- Morissette Amon covered the song as part of her 2013 The Voice of the Philippines.
- Andy Lau covered the song in Cantonese, titled 永遠愛你 ("Forever Loving You"), which appears on his second solo album (情感的禁區/Forbidden Emotional).
- Demi Lovato performed "What About Love" while dressed as the Anonymouse on the 10th season premiere of The Masked Singer in 2023.
