= Sacred Arias (Andrea Bocelli album) =

Studio album by Andrea Bocelli
- Released: November 9, 1999
- Genre: Sacred music; classical
- Length: 62:25
- Label: Philips Records

Andrea Bocelli chronology
Sogno (1999)	Sacred Arias (1999)	Verdi (2000)

Sacred Arias (Italian: Arie Sacre), is the sixth studio album by Italian tenor Andrea Bocelli.

Released in 1999, the album, featuring music composed in traditional Christian styles, is not only Bocelli's most commercially successful classical album to date with over 5 million copies sold, but also the biggest selling classical album by any solo artist in history. Bocelli was accompanied by the Orchestra dell'Accademia Nazionale di Santa Cecilia, conducted by Myung-whun Chung.

== Track listing ==
1. Vavilov (misattributed to Caccini): "Ave Maria"
2. Mascagni: Cavalleria rusticana – "Sancta Maria"
3. Gounod: "Ave Maria"
4. Schubert: Ellens Gesang, Op. 52/6, D 839 – "Ave Maria"
5. Franck: "Panis angelicus"
6. Rossini: Stabat Mater – "Cujus animam"
7. Verdi: Requiem – "Ingemisco"
8. Mozart: "Ave verum corpus", K. 618
9. Wagner: Wesendonck Lieder, WWV 91/1 – "Der Engel"
10. Handel: Serse, HWV 40 – "Frondi tenere ... Ombra mai fu"
11. Niedermeyer: "Pietà, Signore"
12. Rossini: Petite messe solennelle – "Domine Deus"
13. Schubert: "Wiegenlied", Op. 98/2, D 498 – "Mille cherubini in coro"
14. Gruber: "Silent Night"
15. Wade: "Adeste Fideles (O Come, All Ye Faithful)"
16. J.-P. Lécot: "Gloria a te, Cristo Gesù"
17. Georges Bizet: "Agnus Dei" (Bonus)
18. Eric Lévi: "I Believe" (Bonus)

== Charts ==
=== Chart performance ===
Chart	Peak position
Australian Albums	7
Austrian Albums	2
Belgian Albums (Flanders)	9
Belgian Albums (Wallonia)	10
Canadian Albums	6
Canadian Classical Albums	1
Danish Albums Chart	8
Finnish Albums	8
French Albums	5
German Albums	3
Hungarian Albums	5
Italian Albums	1
Netherlands Albums	1
New Zealand Albums	3
Norwegian Albums	2
Swedish Albums	15
Swiss Albums	2
UK Albums	20
US Billboard 200	22
US Classical Albums	1

== Certifications and sales ==
Region	Certification	Certified units/sales
Australia (ARIA)	Platinum	70,000^{^}
Austria (IFPI Austria)	Gold	25,000^{*}
Belgium (BRMA)	Gold	25,000^{*}
Canada (Music Canada)	2× Platinum	200,000^{^}
France (SNEP)	2× Gold	200,000^{*}
Netherlands (NVPI)	4× Platinum	100,000^{^}
New Zealand (RMNZ)	Platinum	15,000^{^}
Norway (IFPI Norway)	Platinum	60,000
Poland (ZPAV)	Platinum	100,000^{*}
Sweden (GLF)	Gold	40,000^{^}
Switzerland (IFPI Switzerland)	Platinum	50,000^{^}
United Kingdom (BPI)	Platinum	300,000^{^}
United States (RIAA)	Platinum	1,000,000^{^}
United States (RIAA) video	Gold	50,000^{^}
Summaries
Europe (IFPI)	Platinum	1,000,000^{*}
Worldwide	—	5,000,000
^{*} Sales figures based on certification alone.^{^} Shipments figures based on certification alone.

== Awards ==
In 2000, the album led Bocelli to receive an ECHO Klassik for "Bestseller of the year", as well as a 2000 Classical BRIT Award for "Album of the Year", and a Goldene Europa for classical music, in 2000.

== PBS special ==
A DVD of the concert, filmed in the church of Santa Maria sopra Minerva in Rome, was also released in 1999. The concert aired on the PBS program Great Performances. This broadcast was nominated in 2000 for an Emmy Award – Outstanding Classical Music-Dance Program. Sacred Arias Special Edition, a two disc set with CD and DVD was released in 2003.
