= Head On (Toronto album) =

Studio album by Toronto
- Released: 1981
- Recorded: Le Studio, Morin Heights, Quebec
- Genre: Rock
- Length: 38:10
- Label: Solid Gold Records
- Producer: Terry Brown

Toronto chronology
| Lookin' for Trouble (1980) | Head On (1981) | Get It on Credit (1982) |

Head On is the second studio album by Canadian rock band Toronto, released in 1981. The album was produced by Terry Brown, best known for his work with Rush.

== Track listing ==
=== Side 1 ===
1. "Head On" (Brian Allen) - 4:17
2. "Silver Screen" (Allen) - 4:04
3. "Still Talkin' 'bout Love" (Allen) - 4:15
4. "Someone Will Play the Blues" (Allen) - 3:09
5. "It Comes from You" (Allen) - 4:02

=== Side 2 ===
1. "Enough Is Enough" (Scott Kreyer, Jimmy Fox) - 4:10
2. "Master of Disguise" (Sheron Alton) - 4:34
3. "Blackmail" (Kreyer, Holly Woods) - 4:56
4. "Gone in a Flash" (Allen, Kreyer) - 4:43

== Personnel ==
=== Band members ===
- Holly Woods - lead vocals
- Sheron Alton - guitar, backing vocals
- Brian Allen - guitar, lead vocals
- Scott Kreyer - keyboards, backing vocals
- Nick Costello - bass guitar
- Jimmy Fox - drums

=== Production ===
- Terry Brown - producer
- Paul Northfield - engineer
- Peter Jensen - mastering

== Charts ==
| Chart (1981) | Peak position |
|---|---|
| Canada Top Albums/CDs (RPM) | 17 |

== Certifications ==
| Region | Certification | Certified units/sales |
|---|---|---|
| Canada (Music Canada) | Platinum | 100,000^{^} |
^{^} Shipments figures based on certification alone.
