= Classic Brit Awards =

British classical music awards (2000–2018)

The Classic Brit Awards
- Awarded for: Excellence in classical music
- Country: United Kingdom
- Presented by: British Phonographic Industry
- Formerly called: Classical BRIT Awards
- First award: 2000
- Final award: 2018 (on hiatus)
- Website: www.classicbrits.co.uk

Television/radio coverage
- Network: ITV

The Classic BRIT Awards (previously Classical BRIT Awards) are an annual awards ceremony held in the United Kingdom covering aspects of classical and crossover music, and are the equivalent of popular music's Brit Awards. The awards are organised by the British Phonographic Industry (BPI) and were inaugurated in 2000 "in recognition of the achievements of classical musicians and the growth of classical music sales in the UK".

The ceremony takes place in the Royal Albert Hall each May. The event combines live performances with specially commissioned awards presented throughout the evening. Since 2011, the ceremony has been known as "Classic BRIT Awards". After a five-year hiatus following the 2013 ceremony, the Classic BRIT Awards returned with a ceremony broadcast from the Royal Albert Hall on 13 June 2018. It was subsequently revealed that the Classic BRIT Awards would become a biennial event, with the next ceremony scheduled to be held in 2020. However, due to the impact of the COVID-19 pandemic on television networks across the globe, the 2020 live ceremony was suspended to a later date due to a ban on large gatherings by the government in March of that year.

Voting for the awards is done by "an academy of industry executives, the media, the British Association of Record Dealers (BARD), members of the Musicians Union, lawyers, promoters, and orchestra leaders," except for "Album of the Year" which is voted for by listeners of Classic FM.

== Awards ==
=== 2000 ===
Friday 5 May 2000. Hosted by Sir Trevor McDonald.

- British Artist of the Year – Charlotte Church
- Female Artist of the Year – Martha Argerich
- Male Artist of the Year – Bryn Terfel
- Critics' Award – Ian Bostridge
- Album of the Year – Andrea Bocelli – Sacred Arias
- Best selling classical album – Andrea Bocelli – Sacred Arias
- Ensemble/Orchestral Album of the Year – Choir of King's College, Cambridge – Rachmaninoff Vespers
- Young British Classical Performer – Daniel Harding
- Outstanding Contribution to Music – Nigel Kennedy

=== 2001 ===
Thursday 31 May 2001. Hosted by Katie Derham.

- Female Artist of the Year – Angela Gheorghiu
- Male Artist of the Year – Nigel Kennedy
- Album of the Year – Russell Watson – The Voice
- Ensemble/Orchestral Album of the Year – Sir Simon Rattle and Berliner Philharmoniker – Mahler, 10th Symphony
- Young British Classical Performer – Freddy Kempf
- Critics' Award – Sir Simon Rattle and Berliner Philarmoniker – Mahler, 10th Symphony
- Best-selling Debut Album – Russell Watson – The Voice
- Outstanding Contribution to Music – Sir Simon Rattle

=== 2002 ===
Wednesday 22 May 2002. Hosted by Katie Derham.

- Female Artist of the Year – Cecilia Bartoli
- Male Artist of the Year – Sir Colin Davis
- Album of the Year – Russell Watson – Encore
- Ensemble/Orchestral Album of the Year – Richard Hickox and London Symphony Orchestra – Vaughan Williams, A London Symphony
- Contemporary Music Award – Tan Dun – Crouching Tiger, Hidden Dragon
- Young British Classical Performer – Guy Johnston
- Critics' Award – Sir Colin Davis and London Symphony Orchestra – Berlioz, Les Troyens
- Biggest-selling Classical Album – Russell Watson – Encore
- Outstanding Contribution to Music – Andrea Bocelli

=== 2003 ===
Thursday 22 May 2003. Hosted by Katie Derham.

- Female Artist of the Year – Renée Fleming
- Male Artist of the Year – Sir Simon Rattle
- Album of the Year – Andrea Bocelli – Sentimento
- Best selling classical album – Andrea Bocelli – Sentimento
- Ensemble/Orchestral Album of the Year – Berliner Philharmoniker and Sir Simon Rattle – Mahler, Symphony no. 5
- Contemporary Music Award – Arvo Pärt – Orient & Occident
- Young British Classical Performer – Chloë Hanslip
- Critics' Award – Murray Perahia – Chopin, Etudes Opus 10, Opus 25
- Outstanding Contribution to Music – Cecilia Bartoli

=== 2004 ===
Wednesday 26 May 2004. Hosted by Katie Derham.

- Female Artist of the Year – Cecilia Bartoli
- Male Artist of the Year – Bryn Terfel
- Album of the Year – Bryn Terfel – Bryn
- Ensemble/Orchestral Album of the Year – Sir Simon Rattle and Vienna Philharmonic – Beethoven Symphonies
- Contemporary Music Award – Philip Glass – The Hours
- Young British Classical Performer – Daniel Hope
- Critics' Award – Vengerov, Rostropovich and London Symphony Orchestra – Britten/Walton Concertos
- Outstanding Contribution to Music – Renée Fleming

=== 2005 ===
Wednesday 25 May 2005. Hosted by Lesley Garrett.

- Female Artist of the Year – Marin Alsop
- Male Artist of the Year – Bryn Terfel
- Album of the Year – Katherine Jenkins – Second Nature
- Ensemble/Orchestral Album of the Year – Harry Christophers and The Sixteen – Renaissance
- Contemporary Music Award – John Adams – On the Transmigration of Souls
- Soundtrack Composer Award – John Williams – Harry Potter and the Prisoner of Azkaban and The Terminal
- Young British Classical Performer – Natalie Clein
- Critics' Award – Stephen Hough – Rachmaninov Piano Concertos
- Outstanding Contribution to Music – James Galway

=== 2006 ===
Thursday 4 May 2006. Hosted by Michael Parkinson.

- Singer of the Year – Andreas Scholl – Arias for Senesino
- Instrumentalist of the Year – Leif Ove Andsnes – Rachmaninov Piano Concerto 1 and 2
- Album of the Year – Katherine Jenkins – Living A Dream
- Ensemble/Orchestral Album of the Year – Takács Quartet – Beethoven: The Late String Quartets
- Contemporary Music Award – James MacMillan – Symphony no 3, Silence
- Soundtrack/Musical Theatre Composer Award – Dario Marianelli – Pride & Prejudice
- Young British Classical Performer – Alison Balsom
- Critics' Award – Royal Opera House Chorus and Orchestra, Plácido Domingo, Antonio Pappano – Tristan und Isolde
- Lifetime Achievement – Plácido Domingo

=== 2007 ===
Thursday 3 May 2007. Hosted by Fern Britton.

- Singer of the Year – Anna Netrebko – Russian Album & Violetta
- Instrumentalist of the Year – Leif Ove Andsnes – Horizons
- Album of the Year – Paul McCartney – Ecce Cor Meum
- Contemporary Composer of the Year – John Adams – The Dharma at Big Sur/My Father Knew Charles Ives
- Classical Recording of the Year – Berliner Philharmoniker and Sir Simon Rattle – Holst, The Planets
- Soundtrack Composer of the Year – George Fenton – Planet Earth
- Young British Classical Performer – Ruth Palmer
- Critics' Award – Freiburg Baroque Orchestra, RIAS Kammerchor, René Jacobs – Mozart, La Clemenza di Tito
- Lifetime Achievement – Vernon Handley

=== 2008 ===
Thursday 8 May 2008. Hosted by Myleene Klass.

- Male of the Year – Sir Colin Davis
- Female of the Year – Anna Netrebko
- Young British Classical Performer – Nicola Benedetti
- Album of the Year – Blake – Blake
- Soundtrack of the Year – Blood Diamond – James Newton Howard
- Critics' Award – Steven Isserlis – Bach: Cello Suites
- Outstanding Contribution — Andrew Lloyd Webber

=== 2009 ===
Thursday 14 May 2009. Hosted by Myleene Klass.

- Male of the Year – Gustavo Dudamel
- Female of the Year – Alison Balsom
- Composer of the Year – Howard Goodall
- Young British Classical Performer – Alina Ibragimova
- Album of the Year – Royal Scots Dragoon Guards Spirit of the Glen–Journey
- Soundtrack of the Year – The Dark Knight – Hans Zimmer and James Newton Howard
- Critics' Award – Sir Charles Mackerras/Scottish Chamber Orchestra – Mozart Symphonies nos. 38–41
- Lifetime Achievement in Music – José Carreras

=== 2010 ===
Thursday 13 May 2010. Hosted by Myleene Klass.

- Male Artist of the Year – Vasily Petrenko
- Female Artist of the Year – Angela Gheorghiu
- Composer of the Year – Thomas Ades – The Tempest
- Young British Classical Performer or Group of the Year – Jack Liebeck
- Album of the Year – Only Men Aloud! – Band of Brothers
- Soundtrack of the Year – Revolutionary Road – Thomas Newman
- Critics' Award – Orchestra e Coro dell'Accademia Nazionale di Santa Cecilia, conducted by Antonio Pappano with Rolando Villazón, Anja Harteros, Sonja Ganassi and Rene Pape – Messa da Requiem
- Lifetime Achievement in Music – Kiri Te Kanawa

=== 2011 ===
Thursday 12 May 2011. Hosted by Myleene Klass.

- Male Artist of the Year – Antonio Pappano
- Female Artist of the Year – Alison Balsom
- Newcomer Award – Vilde Frang
- Composer of the Year – Arvo Pärt
- Critics' Award – Tasmin Little
- Artist of the Decade – Il Divo
- Album of the Year – André Rieu & Johann Strauss Orchestra (Decca) – Moonlight Serenade
- Outstanding Contribution to Music – John Barry

=== 2012 ===
Tuesday 2 October 2012. Hosted by Myleene Klass.

- International Artist of the Year – Andrea Bocelli
- Lifetime Achievement Award – John Williams
- Special Recognition Award – Classic FM (UK)
- Female Artist of the Year – Nicola Benedetti
- Male Artist of the Year – Vasily Petrenko
- Breakthrough Artist of the Year – Milos Karadaglic
- Composer of the Year – John Williams
- Critics Award – Benjamin Grosvenor
- Album of the Year – And the Waltz Goes On
- Single of the Year – "Wherever You Are"

=== 2013 ===
Wednesday 2 October 2013. Hosted by Myleene Klass.

- International Artist of the Year – Lang Lang
- Lifetime Achievement Award – Luciano Pavarotti (posthumous)
- Female Artist of the Year – Nicola Benedetti
- Male Artist of the Year – Daniel Barenboim
- Breakthrough Artist of the Year – Tine Thing Helseth
- Composer of the Year – Hans Zimmer
- Critics Award – Jonas Kaufmann
- Album of the Year – André Rieu, Magic of the Movies
- Outstanding Contribution to Music; Hans Zimmer

=== 2018 ===
Wednesday 13 June 2018. Hosted by Myleene Klass and Alexander Armstrong

- Female Artist of the Year – Renée Fleming
- Male Artist of the Year – Sheku Kanneh-Mason
- Group of the Year – Michael Ball & Alfie Boe
- Soundtrack of the Year — The Greatest Showman OST (Benj Pasek & Justin Paul)
- Critics' Choice in association with Apple Music – Sheku Kanneh-Mason
- Classic FM Album of the Year – Michael Ball & Alfie Boe
- Classic BRITs Icon – Andrea Bocelli
- Sound of Classical 2018 – Jess Gillam
- PPL Classic BRITs Breakthrough Artist of the Year – Tokio Myers
- Special Recognition Award for Musical Theatre & Education – Andrew Lloyd Webber
- Lifetime Achievement Award – Dame Vera Lynn

=== 2019 ===
Not held.
