= Lookin' for Trouble =

- Photography Michael Gray Cover art by Hugh Syme

Studio album by Toronto
- Released: April 1980
- Recorded: Sounds Interchange Studios, Toronto, Ontario, Canada
- Genre: Glam punk
- Length: 46:05
- Label: Solid Gold Records
- Producers: Bill Henderson, Brian MacLeod

Toronto chronology
Lookin' for Trouble (1980)	Head On (1981)

US edition cover

Professional ratings
Review scores
Source	Rating
AllMusic	3/5 stars

Lookin' for Trouble is the 1980 debut album of Canadian rock band Toronto. Most tracks on the album were released as a singles. The U.S. release uses different cover artwork and excludes the final track "Let's Spend the Night Together". The album reached Platinum status in Canada, but did not chart in the US. The original cover art was designed by Hugh Syme and was originally intended to be the cover art for Max Webster's High Class in Borrowed Shoes.

== Track listing ==
All songs by Brian Allen, except where indicated.

=== Side 1 Uptown ===
1. "Even the Score" (Allen, Jimmy Fox) - 3:26
2. "You Better Run" (Eddie Brigati, Felix Cavaliere) - 3:26
3. "5035" - 3:20
4. "Get Your Hands Off Me" (Allen, Holly Woods) - 3:33
5. "Do Watcha, Be Watcha" - 3:43
6. "Tie Me Down" - 3:41

=== Side 2 Downtown ===
7. "Don't Stop Me" - 4:06
8. "Lookin' for Trouble" - 3:45
9. "Delirious" - 3:20
10. "Shot Down" - 3:41
11. "Let's Spend the Night Together" (Jagger/Richards) - 4:02

== Personnel ==
=== Band members ===
- Holly Woods - lead vocals
- Sheron Alton - guitar, backing vocals
- Brian Allen - guitar, lead vocals
- Scott Kreyer - keyboards, backing vocals
- Nick Costello - bass guitar
- Jimmy Fox - drums

=== Production ===
- Bill Henderson, Brian MacLeod - producers
- Rolf Henneman - engineer
- Frank DeLuna - mastering

== Charts ==
Chart (1980)	Peak position
Canada Top Albums/CDs (RPM)	17
US Billboard 200	185

== Certifications ==
Region	Certification	Certified units/sales
Canada (Music Canada)	Platinum	100,000^{^}
^{^} Shipments figures based on certification alone.
