= Girls' Night Out (Toronto album) =

- Original 3-D album cover

Studio album by Toronto
- Released: 1983
- Genre: Hard rock
- Length: 36:12
- Label: Solid Gold Records
- Producer: Steve Smith

Toronto chronology
Get It on Credit (1982)	Girls' Night Out (1983)	Greatest Hits (1984)

Alternative cover
- CD re-release cover

Professional ratings
Review scores
Source	Rating
Allmusic	2.5/5 stars

Girls' Night Out is the fourth studio album by Canadian rock band Toronto, released in 1983. The first U.S. release featured 3-D cover artwork and included red/blue 3-D glasses. More personnel changes on this album, with bassist Gary LaLonde passing the torch to Mike Gingrich. The CD release features one bonus track, "What About Love".

The album is dedicated to audio engineer Robbie Whelan, who died in a car accident earlier in the year.

== Track listing ==
=== Side 1 ===
1. "Girls' Night Out" (Brian Allen) - 2:46
2. "All I Need" (Doug May, Stuart Peterson) - 3:41
3. "Ready to Make Up" (Allen) - 3:59
4. "Standing In" (Allen, Jim Vallance) - 4:21
5. "Talk to Me" (Allen, Sheron Alton) - 3:54

=== Side 2 ===
1. "All Night Love Affair" (Allen, Alton, Scott Kreyer, Holly Woods) - 3:29
2. "When Can I See You Again? (Toronto)" (Kreyer, Vallance, Woods) - 3:42
3. "Don't Give Me the Once Over" (Stan Meissner, Fred Mollin) - 3:53
4. "Those Eyes" (Allen) - 3:09
5. "Who's Your Lover" (Allen) - 3:18

== Musicians ==
- Holly Woods - lead vocals
- Sheron Alton - guitar, backing vocals
- Brian Allen - guitar, backing vocals
- Scott Kreyer - keyboards
- Mike Gingrich - bass guitar
- Barry Connors - drums

== Charts ==
Chart (1983)	Peak position
Canada Top Albums/CDs (RPM)	18

== Certifications ==
Region	Certification	Certified units/sales
Canada (Music Canada)	Platinum	100,000^{^}
^{^} Shipments figures based on certification alone.
