= Verdi (album) =

Studio album by Andrea Bocelli
- Released: 12 September 2000
- Genres: Classical; opera
- Label: Philips

Andrea Bocelli chronology
Sacred Arias (1999)	Verdi (2000)	Cieli di Toscana (2001)

Verdi is Italian tenor Andrea Bocelli's seventh studio album and fourth classical album, of Verdi's most famous arias, released in 2000. The Israel Philharmonic Orchestra, conducted by Zubin Mehta, accompanied Bocelli for the album. The album was certified Gold in the US by the Recording Industry Association of America and in Switzerland by IFPI of Switzerland, Platinum in Canada by the Canadian Recording Industry Association, and Double Platinum in the Netherlands by the Nederlandse Vereniging van Producenten en Importeurs van beeld- en geluidsdragers.

== Track listing ==
No.	Title	Opera	Length
1.	""Di quella pira""	Il Trovatore	3:16
2.	""Ah sì, ben mio""	Il Trovatore	3:18
3.	""La donna è mobile""	Rigoletto	2:11
4.	""Di' tu se fedele""	Un Ballo in Maschera	3:05
5.	""Ma Se M'e Forza Perderti""	Un Ballo in Maschera	2:34
6.	""Ella mi fu rapita!""	Rigoletto	4:37
7.	""Possente amor mi chiama""	Rigoletto	2:57
8.	""Se quel guerrier io fossi!... Celeste Aida""	Aida	4:09
9.	"De' miei bollenti spiriti""	La traviata	3:39
10.	""Oh mio rimorso!""	La traviata	2:54
11.	""La mia letizia infondere vorrei""	I Lombardi	2:07
12.	""Mercé, diletti amici... Come rugiada al cespite... Dell'esilio nel dol""	Ernani	6:58
13.	""Io l'ho perduta... Io la vidi e il suo sorriso""	Don Carlo	3:50
14.	""Quando le sere al placido""	Luisa Miller	5:12
15.	""La vita è inferno all'infelice""	La forza del destino	9:50

== Tracks written by ==
1. "Giuseppe Verdi, Salvatore Cammarano": 1,2,14
2. "Giuseppe Verdi, Francesco Maria Piave": 3,6,7,9,10,12
3. "Giuseppe Verdi, Antonio Somma": 4,5
4. "Giuseppe Verdi, Antonio Ghislanzoni": 8
5. "Giuseppe Verdi, Temistocle Solera": 11
6. "Giuseppe Verdi, Camille Du Locle, François Joseph Méry": 13
7. "Giuseppe Verdi, Antonio Ghislanzoni, Francesco Maria Piave": 15 hitparade.ch

== Charts ==
=== Weekly charts ===
Chart (2000)	Peak position
Australian Albums (ARIA)	20
Austrian Albums (Ö3 Austria)	8
Belgian Albums (Ultratop Flanders)	34
Belgian Albums (Ultratop Wallonia)	23
Dutch Albums (Album Top 100)	8
Finnish Albums (Suomen virallinen lista)	16
French Albums (SNEP)	33
German Albums (Offizielle Top 100)	22
Hungarian Albums (MAHASZ)	4
Irish Albums (IRMA)	54
Italian Albums (FIMI)	31
New Zealand Albums (RMNZ)	26
Norwegian Albums (VG-lista)	28
Scottish Albums (Official Charts)	18
Swedish Albums (Sverigetopplistan)	12
Swiss Albums (Schweizer Hitparade)	18
UK Albums (Official Charts)	17
US Billboard 200	23
US Top Classical Albums (Billboard)	1

=== Year-end charts ===
Chart (2000)	Position
Canadian Albums (Nielsen SoundScan)	142
Dutch Albums (Album Top 100)	54

== Certifications ==
Region	Certification	Certified units/sales
Australia (ARIA)	Gold	35,000^{^}
Canada (Music Canada)	Platinum	100,000^{^}
Netherlands (NVPI)	2× Platinum	50,000^{^}
Norway (IFPI Norway)	Gold	25,000^{‡}
Switzerland (IFPI Switzerland)	Gold	25,000^{^}
United Kingdom (BPI)	Gold	100,000^{^}
United States (RIAA)	Gold	500,000^{^}
^{^} Shipments figures based on certification alone.^{‡} Sales+streaming figures based on certification alone.
