= Sentimento =

Studio album by Andrea Bocelli
- Released: 5 November 2002
- Recorded: 30 September – 7 October 2002
- Genre: Classical
- Length: 56:42
- Label: Decca, Sugar Records

Andrea Bocelli chronology
Cieli di Toscana (2001)	Sentimento (2002)	Andrea (2004)

Sentimento is the ninth studio album released by Italian tenor Andrea Bocelli. It was recorded between 30 September and 7 October 2000, and released on 5 November 2002.

The album was conducted by Lorin Maazel with London Symphony Orchestra, and Bocelli received two 2003 Classical BRIT Awards for "Best selling classical album" and "Album of the year" for Sentimento, in 2003.

As of January 2003, Sentimento has reached worldwide sales of 2.5 million copies.

== Track listing ==
No.	Title	Composer	Length
1.	"En Aranjuez Con Tu Amor"	Rodrigo	3:29
2.	"Mattinata"	Leoncavallo	2:34
3.	"Barcarolle"	Offenbach	2:39
4.	"L'Alba Separa Dalla Luce I'ombra"	Tosti	2:48
5.	"Sogno d'Amore"	Liszt	5:23
6.	"La Serenata"	Tosti	3:24
7.	"L'ultima canzone"	Tosti	4:22
8.	"Malia"	Tosti	3:34
9.	"La danza"	Rossini	3:08
10.	"Ideale"	Tosti	3:16
11.	"Sogno"	Tosti	3:08
12.	"Plaisir d'Amour"	Martini	3:56
13.	"Musica proibita"	S. Gastaldon	3:41
14.	"Occhi di fata"	Denza	3:30
15.	"'A Vucchella"	Tosti	2:47
16.	"Vorrei morire!"	Tosti	5:03
17.	"Vaghissima Sembianza"	S. Donaudy	5:28

== Charts ==
=== Weekly charts ===
Chart (2002–03)	Peak position
Australian Albums (ARIA)	17
Austrian Albums (Ö3 Austria)	14
Belgian Albums (Ultratop Flanders)	30
Belgian Albums (Ultratop Wallonia)	42
Danish Albums (Hitlisten)	15
Dutch Albums (Album Top 100)	4
Finnish Albums (Suomen virallinen lista)	18
French Albums (SNEP)	33
German Albums (Offizielle Top 100)	30
Hungarian Albums (MAHASZ)	4
Irish Albums (IRMA)	15
Italian Albums (FIMI)	11
Norwegian Albums (VG-lista)	17
New Zealand Albums (RMNZ)	14
Scottish Albums (OCC)	9
Swedish Albums (Sverigetopplistan)	10
Swiss Albums (Schweizer Hitparade)	22
UK Albums (OCC)	7
US Billboard 200	12
US Top Classical Albums (Billboard)	1

=== Year-end charts ===
Year-end chart performance for Sentimento
Chart (2002)	Position
Canadian Albums (Nielsen SoundScan)	67
Dutch Albums (Album Top 100)	52
UK Albums (OCC)	43

Chart (2003)	Position
Australian Albums (ARIA)	64
Dutch Albums (Album Top 100)	66
US Billboard 200	108

== Certifications ==
Region	Certification	Certified units/sales
Australia (ARIA)	Platinum	70,000^{^}
Canada (Music Canada)	Platinum	100,000^{^}
Denmark (IFPI Danmark)	Gold	25,000^{^}
Hungary (MAHASZ)	Platinum	20,000^{^}
Netherlands (NVPI)	Gold	40,000^{^}
New Zealand (RMNZ)	Gold	7,500^{^}
Norway (IFPI Norway)	Gold	20,000^{*}
Sweden (GLF)	Gold	30,000^{^}
Switzerland (IFPI Switzerland)	Gold	20,000^{^}
United Kingdom (BPI)	Platinum	300,000^{^}
United States (RIAA)	Platinum	1,000,000^{^}
Summaries
Europe (IFPI)	Platinum	1,000,000^{*}
Worldwide	—	2,500,000
^{*} Sales figures based on certification alone.^{^} Shipments figures based on certification alone.
