= Angela Harris (singer) =

Canadian singer-songwriter

Angela Harris (born 1971) is a Canadian alternative country music, bluegrass music and folk/roots singer and songwriter. Harris signed three record deals between 2005 and 2009. Since 2011 she has released records independently on her own label, Routes Records. Her work charted #7 on the Top 10 National Earshot Radio Chart and she has toured in Canada, the United Kingdom and in the U.S.

Harris won the BCCMA (British Columbia Country Music Association) Roots/Canadiana award in 2011. She has also earned 10 BCCMA nominations and a West Coast Music Award (WCMA) nomination for Outstanding Roots Album.

== Early life ==
Harris was born Angela Dawne Tillotson in Kelowna, British Columbia, and raised in Chilanko Forks. In 2000, Angela moved to Vancouver, British Columbia, with her three daughters to pursue her music career.

== Career ==
Harris has released four LP records, 'Angela Harris' (Independent, 2000), 'Roots' (Maximum/Universal, 2005 & Maximum/Routes/Rounder, 2006), 'Is Your Life As It Should Be' (Maximum/Routes/EMI, 2009) and 'A Woman Like Me' (Routes Records, 2018). She has five singles, "Family Matters" (Premiere/Routes, 2011), "Let's Go For a Ride" (Premiere/Routes, 2012), "Should Have Known (Routes Records, 2018), "Still" (Routes Records, 2018) and "I Want Them Gone" (Routes Records, 2018).

Harris has participated in several music projects, artist records and compilations. These include The High Bar Gang's 'Lost & Undone: A Gospel Bluegrass Companion', Leslie Alexander's 'Savaage Country', Grrrls with Guitars 'Compilation Volume 2', Barney Bentall's 'Flesh and Bone', Matt Masters' 'All Western Winners', Lloyd Tosoff's 'Win Draw or Lose', and Chris Ronald's 'Fragments'.

In 2010, Harris joined with Barney Bentall, Shari Ulrich, Wendy Bird, Rob Becker, Colin Nairne and Eric Reed to form the High Bar Gang. This collaboration led to a JUNO nomination and Vocal Group of the Year at the Canadian Folk Music Awards in 2014.

== Recent events ==
Harris completed her fourth LP record 'A Woman Like Me' with producer John MacArthur Ellis in North Vancouver. The album is scheduled for release in 2018 on Routes Records.

Harris launched a Vancouver-based artist development and music marketing business, Fair Wend Entertainment Services, in 2010.

== Discography ==
=== Albums ===
- Angela Harris (2000)
- Roots (2005)
- Is Your Life As It Should Be (2009)
- A Woman Like Me (2018)

Singles

- "Family Matters" (2011)
- "Let's Go For A Ride" (2012)
- "Should Have Known" (2018)
- "Still" (2018)
- "I Want Them Gone" (2018)

Grrrls with Guitars

Matt Masters All Western Winners

Barney Bentall's Flesh and Bone

Lloyd Tosoff's Win Lose or Draw
