= It's Been a Long Time =

It's Been a Long Time may refer to:

- It's Been a Long Time, an album by Ju-Taun, 2003
- It's Been a Long Time, an album by The New Birth, 1974
- "It's Been a Long Time", a song by Dead or Alive from the album Youthquake
- "It's Been a Long, Long Time", a 1945 song written by Jule Styne and Sammy Cahn
- It's Been a Long Long Time (album), an album by the Hep Stars
