= Robin Russell (musician) =

American drummer

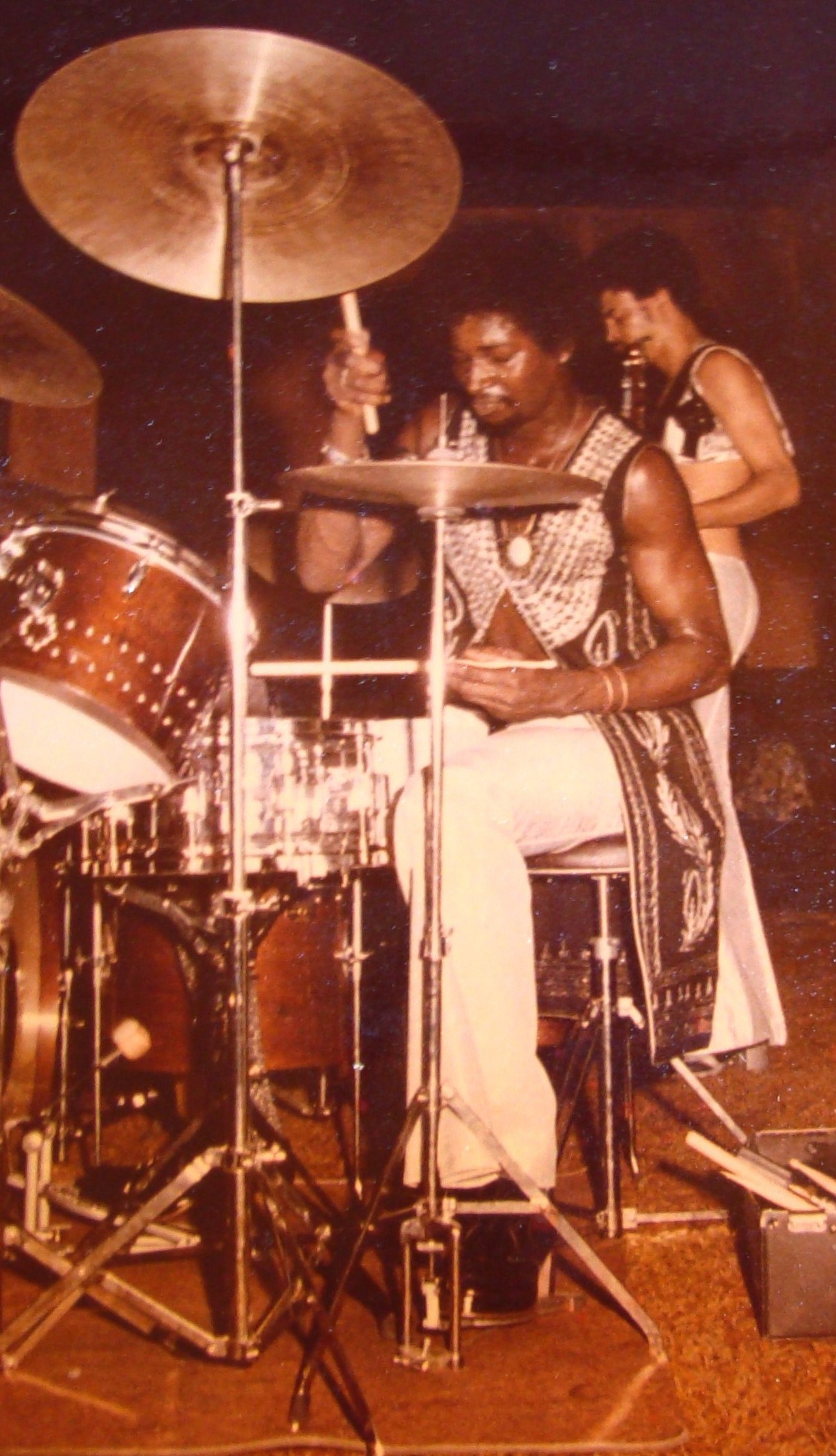
- Robin Russell drumming with New Birth at the Total Experience Night Club on Crenshaw Blvd., Los Angeles, 1974

Background information
- Born: August 27, 1952; Los Angeles, California, U.S.
- Died: September 8, 2021 (aged 69) Los Angeles, California, U.S.
- Genres: R&B, funk, rock, jazz, blues, Latin
- Occupations: Drummer, composer, instructor
- Instrument: Drums
- Years active: 1970-2021
- Website: www.home.earthlink.net/~rrussell007/

Robin Russell (August 27, 1951 – September 8, 2021) was an American drummer, songwriter, and recording artist from Los Angeles, California.

== Early life ==
Robin Russell was born in Los Angeles, California and grew up in the city's South Los Angeles area where he attended 59th Street Elementary School, Horace Mann Jr. High School, Washington Preparatory High School (freshman year), graduated from Crenshaw High School, and attended Los Angeles City College where he continued studies in drums and music.

== Career ==
As of September 1972, Russell was the drummer with the rhythm and blues ensemble New Birth and their instrumental counterpart, the Nite-Liters. Russell performed with Little Richard including the performance at "The London Rock and Roll Show", Wembley Stadium, London, England, August 5, 1972. Russell also performed with Johnny "Guitar" Watson, disco era singer Sylvester, and performed with a variety of artists in the Los Angeles area including Richard Berry (composer of "Louie Louie"), Danny Flores (composer of "Tequila"), and Rosa Lee Brooks, who recorded "My Diary" with Jimi Hendrix. Since the onset of digital recording technology in the 1980s, Russell's drums have been sampled by a number of hip-hop, rap, and R&B artists including Jamie Foxx, Mariah Carey, LL Cool J, Big Daddy Kane, Public Enemy, The Notorious B.I.G., Fat Joe, De La Soul, Black Sheep, A Tribe Called Quest, and more. In 2001, Russell contributed liner note comments for Billy Cobham's Rudiments-Anthology CD, and Russell was a featured artist in the June 2010 issue of Modern Drummer magazine. More recently Russell's drumming was featured in an article written by Mary MacVean and published on the front page section of the Los Angeles Times newspaper, dated November 6, 2015. This article is also posted on latimes.com. Over the years Russell periodically joined New Birth for reunion shows. Russell died in his Los Angeles home on September 8, 2021.

== Television and film appearances ==
During the early and mid 1970s, Russell (with New Birth and the Nite-Liters) appeared on numerous syndicated television shows including American Bandstand, Don Kirshner's Rock Concert, Soul Train, The Merv Griffin Show, Soul, and in 1975 Russell made a cameo appearance as a guest percussionist with Buddy Miles & the Earth Rockers in an episode of Don Kirshner's Rock Concert. Russell's performance with Little Richard at Wembley Stadium was filmed and aired on television in 1973. Included as part of a DVD released as The London Rock and Roll Show, and released in 2001 as a CD of the same title.

== Movie scores and television commercials ==
Russell's drumming can also be heard as a portion of the sound track for the 1973 action movie Gordon's War, where New Birth performed the song "Come On and Dream Some Paradise", and around 2006-07 a Jeep Compass commercial was aired on television using an altered sample of New Birth's "Got to Get a Knutt", of which Russell is a co-writer.

== Outdoor drumming ==
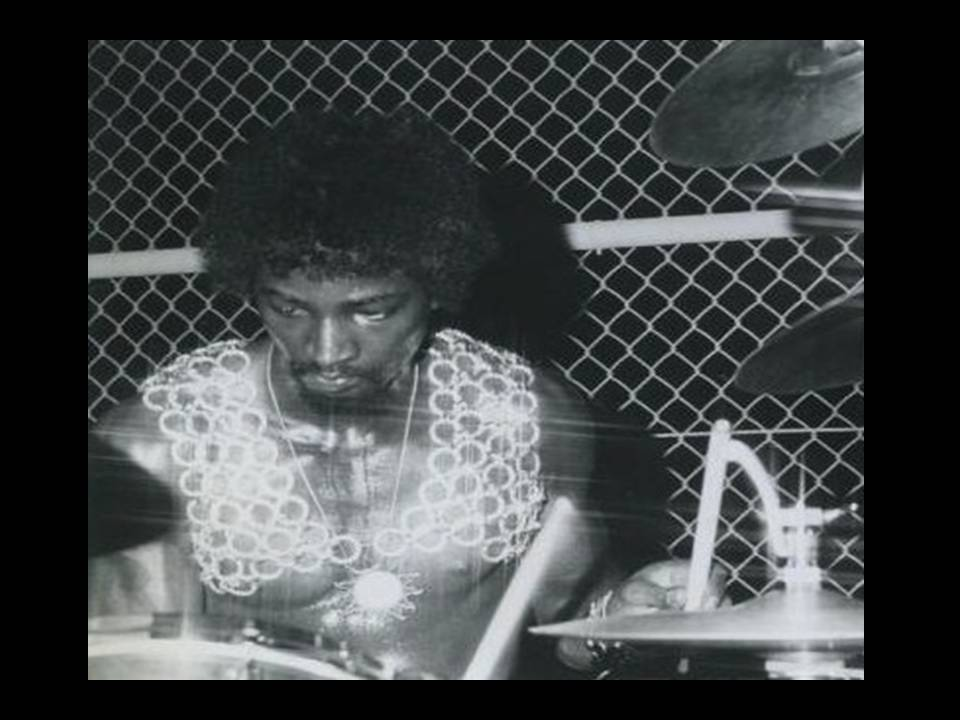
Robin Russell drumming at a drum circle adjacent to the Merry-Go-Round in Griffith Park, Los Angeles - 1974.

With an appreciation for the forests and other scenic wonders of mother nature, Russell developed a passion for drumming outdoors, and frequently set up in the mountains of Los Angeles's Griffith Park, where he was known to hold sunrise-to-sunset solo drum sessions. Russell was also a solo performer (a.k.a. "Drum Beats") at the Los Angeles Marathon from 2004, and at the Orange County Marathon from 2013, typically drumming non-stop for hours as a source of inspiration and energy for race participants.

== Discography ==
As Robin Russell

- Drum Beats (CD Baby, 2004)

As New Birth

- Birth Day (RCA, 1973) US #31, US Black Albums #1
- It's Been a Long Time (RCA, 1974) US #50, US Black Albums #7
- Comin' From All Ends (RCA, 1974) US #56, US Black Albums #20
- Blind Baby (Buddah Records, 1975) US #57, US Black Albums #17
- Love Potion (Warner Bros. Records, 1976) US #168, US Black Albums #22
- Disco (RCA, 1977)
- God's Children (PNEC Records, 1998)

As The Nite-Liters

- A-Nal-Y-Sis (RCA, 1973) US Black Albums #34

With Little Richard

- The London Rock and Roll Show - CD (2001 TKO/Magnum Music)

=== Singles with New Birth ===
Year	Title	Chart positions	
Year	Title	U.S. Pop Singles	U.S. Black Singles
1973	"I Can Understand It"	35	4
1973	"Until It's Time for You to Go"	97	21
1974	"I Wash My Hands of the Whole Damn Deal, Part I"	88	46
1974	"It's Been a Long Time"	66	9
1974	"Wildflower"	45	17
1975	"Comin' From All Ends"	-	76
1975	"Dream Merchant"	36	1
1975	"Grandaddy (Part I)"	95	28
