= Doug Edwards =

Doug Edwards may refer to:

- Doug Edwards (basketball)
- Doug Edwards (musician)

== See also ==
- Douglas Edwards, American radio and television newscaster and correspondent
