= Mama Let Him Play =

Studio album by Doucette
- Released: November 1977
- Recorded: June – August 1977
- Studio: Mushroom Studios, Vancouver
- Genre: Rock
- Length: 37:52
- Label: Mushroom Records
- Producer: Rolf Hennemann

Doucette chronology
Mama Let Him Play (1977)	The Douce Is Loose (1979)

Singles from Mama Let Him Play
- 1. "Down the Road" Released: 1977; 2. "Mama Let Him Play" Released: 1977; 3. "All I Wanna Do" Released: 1977

Professional ratings
Review scores
Source	Rating
AllMusic	3/5 stars

Mama Let Him Play is the first album by the Canadian singer, songwriter and guitarist, Jerry Doucette, backed by his band, Doucette. The album was certified Platinum in Canada (in excess of 100,000 copies sold) in 1978. It reached #43 on the Canadian charts.

Debuted on Billboard Hot 100 on 4.08.78 and peaked at #72 on 4.29.78. Spent 8 weeks on the chart.

== Track listing ==
All songs are written by Jerry Doucette unless otherwise noted.

1. "Down the Road" - 3:36
2. "Back Off" - 2:29
3. "When She Loves Me" - 3:57
4. "People Say" - 2:38
5. "All I Wanna Do" (Brent Shindell, Jerry Doucette, Mark Olson) - 5:42
6. "Mama Let Him Play" - 4:26
7. "What's Your Excuse?" - 3:13
8. "It's Gonna Hurt So Bad" - 3:38
9. "Keep On Running" - 3:09
10. "Love Is Gonna Find You" - 5:04

== Personnel ==
Musicians

- Jerry Doucette - vocals, lead and 12-string rhythm guitar
- Don Cummings - bass guitar; harmony vocals on "All I Wanna Do"
- Duris Maxwell - drums, percussion
- Robbie King - organ, piano, clavinet, Fender Rhodes piano
- Brent Shindell - rhythm guitar, acoustic guitar, harmony vocals
- Dale Jacobs - string synthesizer on "Love Is Gonna Find You"

Production

- Rolf Hennemann - producer, engineer
- Marty Lewis - co-producer (tracks 1, 5, 8, 10)
- Loren Salazar - design, artwork
- Jeff Tolman - assistant engineer
- Chuck Kuhn - photography
- Buck Davis - art coordination
