= Something to Live For =

Something to Live For may refer to:

== Music ==
- "Something to Live For" (song), a 1939 jazz standard by Duke Ellington and Billy Strayhorn
- Something to Live For (John O'Callaghan album), 2007
- Something to Live For (Phyno album), 2021
- Something to Live For: The Music of Billy Strayhorn, an album by Art Farmer, 1987
- Something to Live For: A Billy Strayhorn Songbook, an album by John Hicks, 1998
- Something to Live For, a song by Barney Bentall and the Legendary Hearts from their 1987 self-titled album

== Film and television ==
- Something to Live For (film), a 1952 film directed by George Stevens
- Something to Live for: The Alison Gertz Story, a 1992 television film starring Molly Ringwald
- "Something to Live For" (My Name Is Earl), a television episode
