= Coming Together =

Studio album by New Birth
- Released: March 21, 1972
- Recorded: 1970–1971
- Genre: R&B, pop soul, funk, funk rock
- Label: RCA; Sony
- Producer: Harvey Fuqua

New Birth chronology
Ain't No Big Thing, But It's Growing (1971)	Coming Together (1972)	Birth Day (1972)

Professional ratings
Review scores
Source	Rating
AllMusic	3/5 stars

Coming Together is the third album by American funk and R&B collective New Birth, released in March 1972 by RCA.

Like the collective's first two efforts, Coming Together was produced by mentor Harvey Fuqua, whose style of building a whole song around a simple phrase is represented by "The Unh Song" (from their debut album) and the bass-laden "Oh Baby I Love The Way", and his uncredited assistant, Vernon Bullock. It contained two tracks ("Don't Knock My Love" and "I Don't Want To Do Wrong") by its subgroup, Love, Peace & Happiness, which featured Ann Bogan. formerly of the Marvelettes, Leslie Wilson, who would later lead the group on I Can Understand It and Wildflower, and his brother Melvin, which also appear on their "Here 'Tis" album. The song "African Cry" was an Afrocentric version of the Paul Revere & The Raiders song "Indian Reservation". It was this album that brought the various elements of New Birth (which also included the instrumental group The Nite-Liters and vocalists Londee Loren, Alan Frye and Bobby Downs) together and set the direction they would go in the future. On this album, their trademark cover is represented by Frank Sinatra's "All The Way" (which. along with The Unh Song" was actually taken from their first album) and their funk jams "Come Back Into My Life" and "Oh Baby I Love The Way." It was their previous single, "It's Impossible" as well as their next single "I Can Understand It" and following album, "Birthday", that would put them on the map. The song "African Cry" inspired the name for the hip hop collective Native Tongues.

== Track listing ==
1. Two Kinds of People (I Am) 3:09
2. Oh, Baby, I Love the Way 3:59
3. Yesterday I Heard the Rain 2:40
4. African Cry 2:27
5. I Don't Want to Do Wrong* 5:57
6. Don't Knock My Love* 4:28
7. If I Can't Have You 3:17
8. All the Way 2:45
9. Unh Song 3:10
10. Come Back Into My Life 4:36

== Charts ==
Chart (1972)	Peak position
Billboard Best Selling Soul LPs	40

=== Singles ===
Year	Single	Chart positions
Year	Single	US R&B
1972	"I Don't Want to Do Wrong"	41
