= Angela Harris =

Angela Harris may refer to:

- Angela Harris, Baroness Harris of Richmond (born 1944), British peer
- Angela P. Harris (born 1961), law professor at University of California, Davis School of Law
- Angela Harris (Coronation Street), fictional character in British TV soap opera Coronation Street
- Angela Harris (swimmer) (born 1967), Australian swimmer who competed at the 1984 Summer Olympics
- Angela Harris (singer) (born 1971), Canadian country singer
- Angie Akers (born 1976), née Harris, American beach volleyball player

== See also ==
- Angela Harry (born 1963), American model and actress
