= Jerry Doucette =

Canadian guitarist and singer-songwriter (1951–2022)

- Born: 9 September 1951; Montreal, Quebec, Canada
- Died: 18 April 2022 (aged 70); Delta, British Columbia, Canada
- Occupation: Musician
- Years active: 1957 - 2018
- Website: www.jerrydoucette.ca

Jerry Victor Doucette (9 September 1951 – 18 April 2022) was a Canadian guitarist, singer-songwriter, and leader of the band Doucette. He was noted for his hit single "Mama Let Him Play", which made the Billboard Top 100. His band won the Juno Award for Most Promising Group of the Year in 1979.

== Early life ==
Doucette was born in Montreal on 9 September 1951. His family relocated to Hamilton, Ontario, when he was four. Two years later, he started playing the guitar after his father purchased one for him.

His father and uncle were both working musicians, and jam sessions were common in the Doucette household.

Doucette joined numerous bands prior to his solo career, starting with The Reefers at the age of 11. He later moved to Toronto by the time he was twenty years old, and played in Buxton Kastle and the final incarnation of Brutus.

== Career ==
Doucette moved to Vancouver, British Columbia, in 1972 and joined the Seeds of Time, and worked with Lindsay Mitchell and Rocket Norton, both of whom later joined Prism, and Alexis Radlin. After the Seeds of Time, Doucette joined Rocket Norton in The Rocket Norton Band, along with Rick Enns and John Hall. He wrote the B-side, "Donkey Chain", for the band's first single. He subsequently signed a solo recording deal with Mushroom Records, and commenced recording under his surname only.

"Mama Let Him Play", the single from the first Doucette album release of the same name in the fall of 1977, earned platinum status (sales of 100,000 units) in Canada having reached No. 46 on the charts, plus substantial publicity and tour promotion. The single and record were not successful to the same degree in the United States, though the single charted in the Billboard Top 100 and the album in the Billboard 200. The recording band for the single and album was composed of Duris Maxwell on drums, Brent Shindell on guitar, Don Cummings on bass, and Robbie King on keyboards.

The following year's release, The Douce is Loose, was less successful, although it earned gold status (50,000 units sold, No. 27 on the charts) in Canada, and produced the popular single "Nobody" co-written with Maxwell (No. 18 Can.). Mushroom Records eventually succumbed to financial problems in 1980. This left Doucette to find a new label for his third album, Coming up Roses, which was eventually released by Rio Records. This, plus the emergence of new wave music, were blamed for Doucette's lack of follow-up success in the music industry. After a fifteen-year hiatus, he made a comeback with Price Of An Education in 1995.

Both of Doucette's Mushroom Records albums, Mama Let Him Play and The Douce Is Loose, were re-released on compact disc and digital formats for the first time in 2013 through Hamilton, Ontario-based independent record label Linus Entertainment.

== Personal life ==
Doucette was married to Maggie for 43 years until his death. Together, they had five children. He resided in Ladner, British Columbia, and Tsawwassen during his later years.

In August 2016, Doucette collapsed while performing at the Rock the Lake Festival in Kelowna. He retired from music two years later due to his declining health. He died of cancer on 18 April 2022, at the Irene Thomas Hospice in Delta, British Columbia, aged 70.

== Awards and honours ==
- 1979: Juno Award, Most Promising Group of the Year

== Discography ==
=== Albums ===
- 1977: Mama Let Him Play (Mushroom, reissued 1995 on Reluctant) (No. 43 Can.)
- 1979: The Douce is Loose (Mushroom) (No. 27 Can.)
- 1981: Coming up Roses (Rio)
- 1995: Price of an Education (Reluctant)

=== Singles ===
- "Down the Road" (1977) (No. 71 Can.)
- "Mama Let Him Play" (1977) (No. 46 Can.)
- "All I Wanna Do" (1977) (No. 56 Can.)
- "Nobody" (1979) (No. 18 Can.)
- "Someday" (1979)
- "Run Buddy Run" (1979) (No. 83 Can.)
- "It Only Hurts the First Time" (1980)
- "It Doesn't Matter" (1981)
- "How Strong" (1994) (No. 41 Can.)

== See also ==
- Music of Vancouver
- Georgie Fab, bandmate in the group 'Buxton Kastle'
