= Bobby Taylor & the Vancouvers (album) =

Studio album by Bobby Taylor & the Vancouvers
- Released: August 26, 1968
- Genre: Rhythm and blues
- Length: 35:49
- Language: English
- Label: Gordy
- Producer: Al Cleveland; Hal Davis; Berry Gordy, Jr.^{α}; Terry "Buzzy" Johnson; Deke Richards; Smokey Robinson; Frank Wilson

Bobby Taylor & the Vancouvers chronology
Bobby Taylor & the Vancouvers (1968)	Find My Way Back (1990)

Bobby Taylor & the Vancouvers is the sole studio album by Canadian rhythm and blues band Bobby Taylor & the Vancouvers, released by Gordy Records in 1968.

== Reception ==
Editors at AllMusic Guide scored this album four out of five stars, with critic Andrew Hamilton calling it "a marvelous but underrated collection".

== Track listing ==
1. "Does Your Mama Know About Me" (Tom Baird and Thomas Chong) – 2:59
2. "So This Is Love" (Tom Baird) – 2:59
3. "I Am Your Man" (Nickolas Ashford and Valerie Simpson) – 3:33
4. "I Heard It Through the Grapevine" (Barrett Strong and Norman Whitfield) – 2:48
5. "Malinda" (Alfred Cleveland, Terry "Buzzy" Johnson,^{β} and William "Smokey" Robinson) – 2:49
6. "Fading Away" (Smokey Robinson, Robert Rogers, and Warren Moore) – 3:03
7. "You Gave Me Something (and Everything's Alright)" (William Garrett, Albert Hamilton aka "Al Kent", Ronnie Savoy, and Norma Toney) – 3:21
8. "It's Growing" (Pete Moore and Smokey Robinson) – 3:08
9. "One Girl" (Tom Baird) – 2:33
10. "Try a Little Tenderness" (Jimmy Campbell, Reg Connelly, and Harry M. Woods) – 3:00
11. "Day by Day or Never" (Berry Gordy) – 2:50
12. "If You Love Her" (Tom Baird and Bobby Taylor) – 2:41

== Personnel ==
Bobby Taylor & the Vancouvers

- Tommy Chong – guitar, backing vocals
- Wes Henderson – guitar, backing vocals
- Robbie King – organ
- Ted Lewis – drums
- Eddie Patterson – bass guitar, backing vocals
- Bobby Taylor – vocals

Technical personnel

- Al Cleveland – production on "Malinda"
- Hal Davis – production on "It's Growing"
- Berry Gordy, Jr. – production on "Does Your Mama Know About Me", "So This Is Love", "I Heard It Through the Grapevine", "Fading Away", "You Gave Me Something (and Everything's Alright)", "One Girl", "Try a Little Tenderness", "Day by Day or Never", and "If You Love Her"
- Dan Hersch – digital remastering on CD edition
- Bill Inglot – digital remastering on CD edition
- Terry "Buzzy" Johnson – production on "Malinda"
- Lee Kaye – liner notes
- Randy F. Kling – mastering
- Motown GA, P. Bass – liner notes photography
- Deke Richards – production on "It's Growing"
- Smokey Robinson – production on "Malinda"
- George Rodriquez – cover photography
- Frank Wilson – production on "I Am Your Man" and "It's Growing"

== Chart performance ==
Bobby Taylor & the Vancouvers was a hit for Motown, reaching 20th place on the Billboard R&B charts.

== See also ==
- List of 1968 albums

== Notes ==
- ^α The original liner notes to this album only credit Berry Gordy, Jr., founder of Motown. as record producer. The single "Malinda"/"It's Growing" credits "Robinson, Johnson, Cleveland" as songwriters and producers for the A-side and "Richards, Davis, Wilson" as producers on the B-side. See the below note for controversy around the songwriting credit. This is corrected on the 1994 Motown compact disc release.
- ^β While most sources credit "Johnson" as being Terry Johnson, who was an established songwriter and producer at Motown by this time, Peter Benjaminson credits it to Rick James, born James Ambrose Johnson, Jr., who had recently begun his work at Motown.
