= It's Been a Long Time (New Birth album) =

1973 studio album by The New Birth

Studio album by The New Birth
- Released: October 1973
- Genres: R&B; funk; soul
- Length: 39:56
- Label: RCA
- Producer: Harvey Fuqua

The New Birth chronology
Birth Day (1972)	It's Been a Long Time (1973)	Comin' from All Ends (1974)

Professional ratings
Review scores
Source	Rating
AllMusic	4/5 stars

It's Been a Long Time is the fifth studio album by American funk and R&B band The New Birth, released in October 1973 by RCA Records. It was produced by Harvey Fuqua.

The album peaked at number 50 on the Billboard 200. Its two singles, "Wild Flower" and "It's Been a Long Time", peaked at 45 and 66 on the Billboard Hot 100, respectively.

"Wild Flower" would go on to be one of the band's most successful songs and was performed frequently at concerts. It has also been sampled by multiple artists, including on "Unpredictable" by Jamie Foxx.

== Critical reception ==
Andrew Hamilton of AllMusic gave the album a rating of four out of five stars, giving particular praise towards the vocal performances.

== Track listing ==
Track order sourced from Spotify.

It's Been a Long Time track listing
No.	Title	Length
1.	"It's Been a Long Time"	5:54
2.	"Keep on Doin' It"	4:19
3.	"Wild Flower"	6:30
4.	"Ain't No Change"	4:39
5.	"I'd Spend My Whole Life Loving You"	3:30
6.	"Pains of Love"	5:18
7.	"Heaven Says"	4:26
8.	"Come on and Dream Some Paradise"	5:16
Total length:		39:56

== Chart performance ==
Chart (1974)	Peak position
US Billboard Top LPs	50
US Billboard Top R&B LPs	7

=== Singles ===
Year	Single	Chart positions	
Year	Single	US	US R&B
1974	"It's Been a Long Time"	66	9
1974	"Wild Flower"	45	17
