= A-Nal-Y-Sis =

Studio album by The Nite-Liters
- Released: 1973
- Recorded: 1973 at RCA's Studios, New York City, New York; RCA's Studios, Hollywood, California.
- Genre: Soul, funk
- Label: RCA
- Producer: Harvey Fuqua

The Nite-Liters chronology
Different Strokes (1972)	A-Nal-Y-Sis (1973)

Professional ratings
Review scores
Source	Rating
AllMusic	3.5/5 stars

A-Nal-Y-Sis is the fifth and final album by the Louisville, Kentucky group The Nite-Liters, the instrumental ensemble offshoot of New Birth, featuring Tony Churchill, James Baker, Robin Russell, Austin Lander, Robert "Lurch" Jackson, Leroy Taylor, Charlie Hearndon, and Carl McDaniel. It was released in 1973 on RCA Records and produced by mentor Harvey Fuqua.

== Track listing ==
1. "Serenade for a Jive Turkey" (Robin Russell) - 4:52
2. "Anything Goes" (Harvey Fuqua, Leroy Taylor) - 2:44
3. "The Happy Hooker" (Instrumental) 4:19
4. "Craaaashing" (Charles Hearndon, Harvey Fuqua, James Baker, Rodney Vorhis) - 2:23
5. "Damn" (Charles Hearndon) - 3:44
6. "Valdez in the Country" (Donny Hathaway) - 2:44
7. "Drumology" (Robin Russell) - 7:38
8. "Cowboy" (Robert Jackson) - 4:46
9. "Excuse Me While I Do My Thing" (Charles Hearndon) - 3:56
10. "Pee-Foul" (Austin Lander) - 2:52

== Charts ==
Year	Chart positions
Year	US R&B
1973	34
