= Powder Blues Band =

Canadian blues/pop band formed 1978

Tom Lavin & the Legendary Powder Blues (aka Powder Blues Band)
- Origin: Vancouver, British Columbia, Canada
- Genres: Blues, jazz
- Years active: 1978–present
- Members: Tom Lavin; Mike Kalanj; Bill Runge; Vincent Mai; Tony Marryatt; Al Webster
- Past members: Jack Lavin; Willie MacCalder; Duris Maxwell; Wayne Kozak; Gordon Bertram; David Woodward
- Website: http://www.powderblues.net

The Powder Blues Band is a Canadian musical band formed in 1978 in Vancouver. Its first album Uncut went double platinum in Canada. The second album Thirsty Ears was similarly popular.

Their best known songs include: "Boppin' with the Blues", "Doin' It Right", "Thirsty Ears", "Hear That Guitar Ring", and "What've I Been Drinkin".

== History ==
The Powder Blues was founded in 1978 as a house band in Vancouver, British Columbia. The band was founded by brothers Tom Lavin (guitar, vocals), Jack Lavin (bass, vocals), and Willie MacCalder (keyboards, vocals). After playing in local clubs for 18 months, the band released their self-financed and self-produced debut album, Uncut, in 1980, followed by a tour of Canada and the US. The band won the Juno Award for "Most Promising Group of the Year" in 1981. Uncut went double platinum in Canada in 1982, selling over 200,000 copies. Their second album, Thirsty Ears, was released in 1981 and was certified platinum in Canada. In 1986, the band won the American W.C. Handy Award for "Foreign Band of the Year". The band's greatest hits album First Decade was released in 1990 and was certified gold.

The band is now known as Tom Lavin and the Legendary Powder Blues. They were still touring as of 2024.

The initial lineup of the band consisted of:

- Tom Lavin – guitar, vocals
- Jack Lavin – bass
- Duris Maxwell – drums
- Will MacCalder – keyboards, vocals
- Wayne Kozak – saxophone
- Gordon Bertram – saxophone
- David Woodward – saxophone

== Discography ==
=== Singles ===
- "Doin' It Right" – 1980 (#40 Canada)
- "Boppin' with the Blues" – 1980 (#88 Canada)
- "What've I Been Drinkin'" – 1980 (#28 CanAC)
- "Hear That Guitar Ring" – 1981 (#22 Canada; CanCon) and (#22 CanAO; CanCon)
- "Thirsty Ears" – 1981 (#17 Canada)
- "Lovin' Kissin' & Huggin'" – 1981 (#47 Canada)
- "Joy Ridin'" – 1982
- "Sooner or Later" – 1982
- "Should Be You and Me" – 1982
- "Jump Up" – 1983
- "Farmer John" – 1983
- "Roll Over Beethoven" – 1983
- "I'm on the Road Again" – 1984

=== Albums ===
- 1979: Uncut (Blue Wave) (#5 Canada))
- 1980: Uncut [reissue] (Blue Wave/RCA Victor; Liberty)
- 1981: Thirsty Ears (Liberty) (#11 Canada))
- 1982: Party Line (Liberty) (#36 Canada)
- 1983: Powder Blues (Liberty) Note: this is a US only compilation album with the same catalog number as the Canadian Party Line release; it includes 5 tracks from Uncut, 2 tracks from Thirsty Ears and 5 tracks from Party Line.
- 1983: Red Hot/True Blue (RCA Victor [dbl LP]; Flying Fish [sgl LP]) (#88 Canada; 4 weeks)
- 1984: Live at Montreux (Blue Wave) recorded 1983
- 1990: First Decade/Greatest Hits (WEA) compilation
- 1993: Let's Get Loose (WEA)
- 1997: Blue Shadows: Lowell Fulson with the Powder Blues Band (Stony Plain) recorded 1981
- 1997: Live at Montreux [CD reissue] (Blue Wave/Peerless Music)
- 2001: Swingin' the Blues (Blue Wave/Peerless Music)
- 2004: Blues + Jazz = BLAZZ! (Blue Wave/Peerless Music)
- 2007: Platinum (EMI) compilation

== Albums not on compact disc ==
- As of 2024, their three most commercially successful albums are not on compact disc: Uncut (1979), Thirsty Ears (1981), and Party Line (1982).
- Side note: all nine tracks from Uncut are included on the First Decade/Greatest Hits compilation CD.

== Awards ==
- 1981 – Juno Award for "Most Promising Group of the Year"
- 1986 – W. C. Handy Award for Blues, Best Foreign Band
