= Barney Bentall and the Legendary Hearts (album) =

Studio album by Barney Bentall and the Legendary Hearts
- Released: 1988
- Recorded: December 1987 – March 1988
- Studio: Mushroom Studios
- Length: 50:17
- Label: Epic
- Producer: David Tickle

Barney Bentall and the Legendary Hearts chronology
Barney Bentall and the Legendary Hearts (1988)	Lonely Avenue (1990)

Barney Bentall and the Legendary Hearts is the debut album by the Canadian band Barney Bentall and the Legendary Hearts. It became a platinum record in Canada. The album was recorded at Mushroom Studios in Vancouver, British Columbia between December 1987 and March 1988, and was published by Epic Records and CBS Records in 1988. The song "Something to Live For" became a number one hit in Canada, the band's first top-ten single. Two other songs, "House of Love (is Haunted)" and "Come Back to Me", also charted in Canada, and the band became a "pop radio fixture" in Canada.

Gary Fraser, a friend of Barney Bentall, wrote all the album's lyrics. He began writing lyrics for Bentall in 1978, when he sent Bentall poems. Bentall and Fraser prepared a demo tape, produced by Bob Rock. The band hired film students to record a music video for "Something to Live For", which drew the attention of managers at MuchMusic, who broadcast the video frequently. The video was described by media critic Peter Goddard of the Toronto Star as "simplicity itself".

The success of the album resulted in the band receiving the 1989 Juno Award for Most Promising Group of the Year. The band was considered a favourite to win the award against other nominees 54-40, The Jitters, The Northern Pikes, and The Pursuit of Happiness. They were also nominated for Canadian Entertainer of the Year, which was ultimately awarded to Glass Tiger.

The band signed a recording contract with CBS Records and signed a management contract with Bernie Finkelstein. Finklestein would include a quotation of lyrics from "Something to Live for" in his 2012 autobiography True North.

== Track listing ==
Professional ratings
Review scores
Source	Rating
AllMusic	2.5/5 stars

All lyrics are written by Gary Fraser; all music is composed by Barney Bentall.

No.	Title	Length
1.	"Something to Live for"	4:38
2.	"House of Love (Is Haunted)"	3:31
3.	"Jelly Roll" (composed by Barney Bentall, Barry Muir and Colin Nairne)	4:08
4.	"She's My Inspiration"	4:21
5.	"Black Clouds"	7:04
6.	"Come Back to Me"	3:44
7.	"I Want Her"	5:04
8.	"Pale Blue Eyes"	4:31
9.	"Carry on"	4:25
10.	"Somewhere There's an Angel"	4:02
11.	"Josephine" (composed by Barney Bentall, Barry Muir and Colin Nairne)	4:49
