= New Birth (band) =

American musical group

- Also known as: The Nite-Liters, Love, Peace & Happiness, The New Birth
- Origin: Louisville, Kentucky, United States; Detroit, Michigan, United States; Hollywood, California, United States
- Genres: R&B, soul, funk
- Years active: 1963–present
- Labels: RCA, Buddah, Warner Bros., Ariola
- Past members: Leslie Wilson; Melvin Wilson; Londee Loren; Ann Bogan; Bobby Downs; Alan Frye; Tanita Gaines; Janice Carter; Pam Swent; Ron Coleman; Gary Young; James Baker; Terry Simms; Tony Churchill; Johnny Graham; Charlie Hearndon; Robert "Lurch" Jackson; Austin Lander; Carl McDaniel; Robin Russell; Leroy Taylor; George "Slim" House; Jerry Bell; Nathan "Nebs" Neblett; George Dorsey; Danette Williams; Barbara Wilson; David Cathie
- Website: www.thenewbirth.com

New Birth (also known as The New Birth) was an American funk and R&B group. It was originally conceived in Detroit, Michigan, by former Motown songwriter/producer Vernon Bullock and co-founded in Louisville, Kentucky, by him with former singer and Motown songwriter/producer Harvey Fuqua and musicians Tony Churchill, James Baker, Robin Russell, Austin Lander, Robert "Lurch" Jackson, Leroy Taylor, Charlie Hearndon, Bruce Marshall and Nathaniel "Nebs" Neblett (1946–2016).

== History ==
The group began with the instrumental outfit The Nite-Liters, which was formed in 1963 in Louisville, Kentucky by Tony Churchill and Harvey Fuqua. In its heyday, besides Churchill on tenor sax and vibes, the band featured Charlie Hearndon on guitar, James Baker on keyboards, Robin Russell on drums, Robert "Lurch" Jackson on trumpet, Austin Lander on baritone sax, Leroy Taylor on bass, and, later, Carl McDaniel on guitar. Earlier members included Johnny Graham, later of Earth, Wind & Fire, Terry Simms on drums, and Jerry Bell on lead and background vocals. Some sources identify The Nite-Liters as the band that played as The Crawlers with Chicago artist Alvin Cash on his R&B No. 1 1964 hit, "Twine Time".

The Nite-Liters had a few hits before the formation of New Birth proper, including K-Jee (No. 17 R&B & No. 39 Pop), in 1971. In 1969, Vernon Bullock had thought of creating an ensemble of groups for a touring company and Harvey Fuqua and Tony Churchill soon took an interest. After discovering a male vocal group, The Now Sound, which featured Bobby Downs, Ron Coleman, Gary Young (deceased 2018) and George "Slim" House and also a female vocal group, known as Mint Julep, which featured Londee Loren, Tanita Gaines, Janice Carter and Pam Swent, they brought them together with The Nite-Liters plus additional vocalist Alan Frye, calling the newly formed ensemble New Birth. The band came together in 1970 with their self-titled debut on RCA. Their second album, Ain't No Big Thing, But It's Growing, yielded a minor hit with their cover of Armando Manzanero's "It's Impossible", in 1971.

Later that year, Bullock discovered a group from Detroit, Michigan called Love, Peace & Happiness, which featured former Marvelettes singer Ann Bogan and brothers Leslie and Melvin Wilson. Finding that they had the spark that was missing from the New Birth ensemble, he paired them with the Nite-Liters and original members of New Birth, Londee Loren, Bobby Downs and Alan Frye.

In 1972, the reorganized group (as a 17-piece ensemble) reached the Billboard R&B top 10 (No. 4 R&B & No. 35 Pop) with their cover of Bobby Womack and The Valentinos' "I Can Understand It", which paved the way for the band's future success. By the time the song hit the stores, however, Ann had left to devote time to her family, leaving Londee Loren as the only female member. When Fuqua reportedly could not get the performance he wanted out of Londee on their next hit, "Until It's Time for You to Go", it featured, instead of the group members, future Supremes member Susaye Greene as lead vocalist, with Fuqua and Carolyn Willis of Honey Cone doing the spoken intro. However, Londee more than met the challenge in live performances and her voice matured on future releases.

In 1974, the group issued their album It's Been a Long Time, which featured hits including the title track (No. 9 R&B) and their cover of the Skylark song "Wild Flower". After the release of their sixth RCA album, Comin' from All Ends, the group split from RCA, Fuqua and their management company and signed with Buddah.

New Birth's Buddah debut, Blind Baby, featured the group's only number-one R&B single, a cover of the Jerry Butler classic "Dream Merchant". By this time, the Nite-Liters had so merged with the New Birth that the instrumental cut that opened the album was solely credited to New Birth. A move to Warner Bros. Records produced several minor hits and the release of the 1977 album, Behold The Mighty Army, the Wilson brothers left following disagreements in the group.

The group including Baker, Churchill and Lander returned on Ariola in 1979 with Jerry Bell as their lead vocalist. By 1982 with the I'm Back album, Leslie Wilson had left the group to replace Jeffrey Osborne in L.T.D., whilst Jerry Bell departed in 1983 to become lead vocalist for Motown's Dazz Band.

The Wilsons resumed touring with a new quartet ensemble adding two new female vocalists: Barbara Wilson and Danette Williams in 1994, and released an album. Drummer Robin Russell released a solo CD entitled Drum Beats in 2004.

New Birth's lead vocalist Leslie Wilson was a chief influence on soul artist Reggie Sears and Temptations lead singer Ali "Ollie" Woodson.

James Baker died on October 24, 1993, and Leroy Taylor died on January 17, 2012. Robin Russell died in 2021. Melvin Wilson died on March 31, 2023, from pancreatic cancer. Leslie Wilson died on October 27, 2025.

== Discography ==
=== Albums ===
| Year | Album | Peak chart positions | | Label |
| Year | Album | US | US R&B | Label |
|---|---|---|---|---|
As The Nite-Liters
| 1970 | The Nite-Liters | — | — | RCA |
| 1971 | Morning, Noon & the Nite-Liters | 167 | 31 | RCA |
| 1972 | Instrumental Directions | 198 | 41 | RCA |
| 1972 | Different Strokes | — | — | RCA |
| 1973 | A-Nal-Y-Sis | — | — | RCA |
As Love, Peace & Happiness
| 1971 | Love Is Stronger | — | — | RCA |
| 1972 | Here 'Tis | — | — | RCA |
As New Birth
| 1970 | The New Birth | — | — | RCA |
| 1971 | Ain't No Big Thing, But It's Growing | 189 | 50 | RCA |
| 1972 | Coming Together | — | 40 | RCA |
| 1972 | Birth Day | 31 | 1 | RCA |
| 1973 | It's Been a Long Time | 50 | 7 | RCA |
| 1974 | Comin' from All Ends | 56 | 20 | RCA |
| 1975 | Blind Baby | 57 | 17 | Buddah |
| 1976 | Love Potion | 168 | 22 | Warner Bros. |
| 1976 | Reincarnation | — | — | RCA |
| 1977 | The New Birth Disco | — | — | RCA |
| 1977 | Behold the Mighty Army | 164 | 28 | Warner Bros. |
| 1979 | Platinum City | — | — | Ariola |
| 1982 | I'm Back | — | — | RCA |
| 1998 | God's Children | — | — | PNEC Records |
| 2005 | Lifetime | — | — | Orpheus Records |
"—" denotes releases that did not chart.

=== Singles ===
| Year | Title | Chart positions | |
| Year | Title | US Pop | US R&B |
|---|---|---|---|
| 1971 | "It's Impossible" | 52 | 12 |
| 1971 | "K-Jee" | 39 | 17 |
| 1972 | "(We've Got to) Pull Together" | — | 27 |
| 1972 | "Afro-Strut" | 49 | 24 |
| 1972 | "I Don't Want to Do Wrong" | — | 41 |
| 1973 | "I Can Understand It" | 35 | 4 |
| 1973 | "Until It's Time for You to Go" | 97 | 21 |
| 1974 | "I Wash My Hands of the Whole Damn Deal, Part I" | 88 | 46 |
| 1974 | "It's Been a Long Time" | 66 | 9 |
| 1974 | "Wild Flower" | 45 | 17 |
| 1975 | "Comin' from All Ends" | — | 76 |
| 1975 | "Dream Merchant" | 36 | 1 |
| 1975 | "Grandaddy (Part I)" | 95 | 28 |
| 1976 | "The Long and Winding Road" | — | 91 |
| 1978 | "The Mighty Army" | — | 49 |
"—" denotes releases that did not chart or were not released in that territory.
