= Pied Pumkin =

The Pied Pumkin was a band formed in 1973 in Vancouver, British Columbia, Canada, with Rick Scott on dulcimer and vocals, Joe Mock on guitar and vocals, and Shari Ulrich on violin, alto sax, flute, and vocals.

The Kootenays were the Pumkin hotbed. The band formed the label Squash Records to release their albums after collecting $5 each from fans to finance the first album, Pied Pumkin String Ensemble, recorded live at the Simon Fraser University Pub and released in 1975. Their second release Allah Mode, was released in 1976 and included Mock's song "A Fear of Flying".

Ulrich left the band in 1976 to join folk artist Valdy's band, which was then signed to a recording contract with A&M Records under the name The Hometown Band. "A Fear of Flying"—renamed "Flying" to avoid confusion with Erica Jong's best-selling book—became The Hometown Band's first single and the title song of their first album, released in 1976.

Scott and Mock continued touring and recording as the Pied Pear for another eight years. All three original members of the Pied Pumkin reunited in 1998 for a tour and the release of the album Plucking DeVine. The live album Pied Alive followed in 2000. The band released a children's album, Pied Pumkids, in 2007, and won the Canadian Folk Music Award for Children's Album of the Year at the 3rd Canadian Folk Music Awards.

Mock lives in France and returns to Canada on occasion for performances with the Pied Pumkin or Pied Pear. Scott has recorded several popular albums for children, while Ulrich has had a lengthy solo career, as well as projects with "BTU" (with Barney Bentall & Tom Taylor, The High Bar Gang (with Barney Bentall), "The Luckies" (with Jeanne Tolmie & Hilary Grist); and shows with "The Unfaithful Servants". She has produced and hosted Bluebird North/SongBird North for the Songwriters Association of Canada) since 1997.

Scott died on 1 August 2025 at the age of 77.
