= Ain't No Big Thing, But It's Growing =

Studio album by New Birth
- Released: July 17, 1971
- Recorded: 1971
- Studio: RCA's Mid-America Center, Chicago
- Genre: R&B; psychedelic soul; funk
- Length: 48:17
- Label: RCA; Sony
- Producer: Harvey Fuqua

New Birth chronology
The New Birth (1970)	Ain't No Big Thing, But It's Growing (1971)	Coming Together (1972)

Professional ratings
Review scores
Source	Rating
AllMusic	4/5 stars
Rolling Stone	(favorable)

Ain't No Big Thing, But It's Growing is the second album by American funk and R&B collective New Birth, released on July 17, 1971, in North America by RCA.

Released eight months after the release of their self-titled debut album (1970), like the previous album, Ain't No Big Thing was produced by mentor Harvey Fuqua and his assistant Vernon Bullock. Despite the title, the group was transitioning between the instrumental group The Nite-Liters, the female vocalists, The Mint Juleps (which featured Londee Loren (Wiggins), Tanita Gaines, Janice Carter and Pam Swent), male vocalists, The New Sounds (Bobby Downs, Ronald Coleman, Gary Martin Young and a gentleman known as "Slim") plus additional vocalist Allen Frey, who also doubled on percussion, and, a downsized version consisting solely of The Nite-Liters, Londee Loren, Bobby Downs, Allen Frey and the group Love, Peace & Happiness, which featured Ann Bogan, formerly of The Marvelettes, Leslie Wilson (who would later lead on "I Can Understand It", "Wildflower" and "It's Been A Long Time") and his brother Melvin. Ann can be heard leading "Honeybee", vocally working out with Londee Loren (and Tanita Gaines) on the exciting "How Good It Feels" and the entire Love, Peace & Happiness" backs the scaled-down group on their classic take on Perry Como's "It's Impossible".

This album established their trademark covers of other people's hits, most notably, in addition to "It's Impossible", The Five Stairsteps' "Ooh Child", Bread's "Make It With You", The Jackson 5's "Never Can Say Goodbye" and James Taylor's "Fire And Rain". At this point Londee's voice hadn't matured (or been challenged by Susaye Greene's vocals on "Until It's Time For You To Go" under The New Birth name), so she perfectly captures Michael Jackson's sound when he was young. Despite their charting with "Impossible,' the group would not come into their own until their fourth album, "Birth Day" in 1972.

== Track listing ==
1. "O-O-H Child" 3:15 (Stan Vincent)
2. "Make It With You" 2:53 (David Gates)
3. "Never Can Say Goodbye" 3:21 (Clifton Davis)
4. "How Good It Feels" 3:35 (Harvey Fuqua)
5. "It's Impossible" 3:50 (Armando Manzanero, Sid Wayne)
6. "Honeybee" 3:30 (Fuqua, Ann Bogan, Edwenna Edwards, Robert Earl Walker)
7. "Fire and Rain" 4:23 (James Taylor)
8. "Oh What a Feeling" 3:14 (Fuqua)
9. "Let It Be" 3:47 (Gilbert Becaud, Mann Curtis)

== Charts ==
Chart (1971)	Peak position
Billboard Top LPs	189
Billboard Top R&B Albums	50

=== Singles ===
Year	Single	Chart positions	
Year	Single	US	US R&B
1971	"It's Impossible"	52	12
