= The Hometown Band =

Canadian folk music group

- Origin: Vancouver, British Columbia, Canada
- Genres: Rock, progressive rock
- Years active: 1975–1979, 2016
- Label: A&M Records
- Past members: Doug Edwards; Geoff Eyre; Robbie King; Claire Lawrence; Eddie Patterson; Shari Ulrich

The Hometown Band was a Canadian folk music group. They are best known as the backup band for Valdy.

== History ==
The Hometown Band was founded in 1975 by Claire Lawrence, a former member of The Collectors and Chilliwack, as the back-up group for Canadian folk artist Valdy. The band comprised Shari Ulrich (lead vocals, flute, fiddle), Geoff Eyre (drums, vocals), Robbie King (organ, piano, keyboard bass), and Doug Edwards (guitar, keyboards, bass).

Their first LP Flying was released in 1976, and produced two hit singles, the title track and "I'm Ready" (both written by the Pied Pumkin's Joe Mock).

In 1977, Eddie Patterson joined the group, and they recorded a second album, titled The Hometown Band.

The group toured with Valdy in 1977, and continued to tour in 1978. That year the band won the Juno Award for "Most Promising Group of the Year".

The band's second album failed to produce a radio hit, and the band broke up soon after.

Following the band's breakup, Shari Ulrich embarked on a successful solo career, as well as playing in several other groups (Ulrich Henderson Forbes; Bentall Taylor Ulrich; The High Bar Gang; The Luckies) as well as solo performances. She continues to tour and record.

The Hometown Band reunited with Valdy in 2016 for a 40th anniversary tour.

== Discography ==
=== Albums ===
Year	Album
1976	Flying
1977	The Hometown Band
