= Thirsty Ears =

Studio album by Powder Blues
- Released: August 1981
- Studio: Blue Wave Recorders
- Genres: Blues, rock
- Length: 36:11
- Label: Liberty Records
- Producer: Tom Lavin

Powder Blues chronology
Uncut (1980)	Thirsty Ears (1981)	Party Line (1982)

Professional ratings
Review scores
Source	Rating
AllMusic	3/5 stars

Thirsty Ears is the second studio album by Canadian blues band, Powder Blues, released in 1981. Thirsty Ears was the band's follow up to Uncut, released the year before. Thirsty Ears was certified platinum in Canada for 100,000 copies shipped. The title track, "Thirsty Ears", peaked at number 17 on the Canadian singles chart in 1981.

== Track listing ==
1. "Thirsty Ears" (Jack Lavin) – 3:05
2. "Secret Success" (J. Lavin, Tom Lavin) – 3:57
3. "Pink Champagne" (Joe Liggins) – 3:49
4. "Undercover Blues" (J. Lavin, Willie MacCalder) – 3:56
5. "Lovin' Kissin' & Huggin'" (T. Lavin, MacCalder) – 3:16
6. "Joy Ridin'" (J. Lavin) – 3:53
7. "She's Crazy" (David Underwood) – 3:07
8. "Nothin' but a Tease" (T. Lavin) – 4:03
9. "She Took My Soul" (T. Lavin, MacCalder) – 3:15
10. "Will Power" (T. Lavin, MacCalder) – 3:50

== Personnel ==
Powder Blues

- Tom Lavin – guitar, vocals
- Jack Lavin – bass, vocals
- Duris Maxwell – drums, percussion
- Willie MacCalder – piano, organ, vocals
- David Woodward – tenor saxophone, alto saxophone
- Bill Runge – baritone saxophone
- Gabriel Mark Hasselbach – trumpet, trombone

Guest musicians

- Robbie King – keyboards on track 7
- Wayne Kozak – tenor saxophone

Production

- Brian Campbell – engineer
- Tom Lavin – producer, horn arrangements
- Bill Runge – horn arrangements
- Marty Hasselbach – second engineer
- Michael Gluss – cover photos
- Hank Leonhardt – cover concept and sleeve design
- Julian Davis – Powder Blues logo

== Charts ==
Chart (1981)	Peak position
Canada Top Albums/CDs (RPM)	11

== Certifications ==
Region	Certification	Certified units/sales
Canada (Music Canada)	Platinum	100,000^{^}
^{^} Shipments figures based on certification alone.
