= Uncut (album) =

Studio album by Powder Blues Band
- Released: December 1979
- Recorded: Tetrahedron Studio, Vancouver
- Genre: Blues
- Length: 32:33
- Label: Blue Wave
- Producer: Jack Lavin

Powder Blues Band chronology
Uncut (1979)	Thirsty Ears (1981)

Professional ratings
Review scores
Source	Rating
AllMusic	4/5 stars

Uncut is the debut studio album released by Canada's the Powder Blues. It was originally released in December 1979 on the Blue Wave label. RCA re-issued the album in February 1980, with the song "Gimme Some Lovin'" removed from the album. Uncut was produced by Jack Lavin. The album reached #5 in Canada after having spent 5 weeks at #6.

The album was nominated at the 1981 Juno Awards for "Album of the Year", and the band won the Juno Award for "Most Promising Group of the Year" the same year.

== Track listing ==
1. "Boppin' with the Blues" (Tom Lavin) – 3:17
2. "Hear That Guitar Ring" (Jack Lavin, T. Lavin) – 3:43
3. "Just a Little Bit" (Bass, Brown, Thorton, Washington) – 3:36
4. "The Rockchopper" (Powder Blues) – 3:29
5. "Doin' It Right" (T. Lavin) – 3:15
6. "Buzzard Luck" (Wynonie Harris) – 3:00
7. "What've I Been Drinkin'" (J. Lavin) – 3:14
8. "Personal Manager" (Albert King, D. Porter) – 6:29
9. "Sweet Little Girl" (T. Lavin, D. Maxwell) – 3:30
10. "Gimme Some Lovin'" (on original Blue Wave release only)

== Personnel ==
- Tom Lavin – guitar, vocals
- Jack Lavin – bass, vocals
- Duris Maxwell – drums
- Willie MacCalder – piano, keyboards, organ, vocals
- Wayne Kozak – tenor saxophone
- Dave Woodward – tenor saxophone, vocals
- Gord Bertram – baritone saxophone
- Gabriel Mark Hasselbach – trumpet

== Chart ==
Chart (1980)	Peak position
Canada Top Albums/CDs (RPM)	5

== Certifications ==
Region	Certification	Certified units/sales
Canada (Music Canada)	2× Platinum	200,000^{^}
^{^} Shipments figures based on certification alone.
