= Bobby Taylor & the Vancouvers =

Soul band from Vancouver, British Columbia

- Bobby Taylor (far left) and the Vancouvers circa 1966, when the group was known as "Little Daddy & the Bachelors"

Background information
- Also known as: Little Daddy and the Bachelors; Bobby Taylor and the New Vancouvers
- Origin: Vancouver, British Columbia, Canada
- Genres: R&B, soul
- Years active: 1963–1969; 1990
- Labels: Gordy; Motorcity
- Past members: Bobby Taylor; Tommy Chong; Wes Henderson; Eddie Patterson; Robbie King; Ted Lewis

Bobby Taylor & the Vancouvers were a Canadian soul band from Vancouver, British Columbia, Canada. The group recorded for the Gordy Records division of Motown Records in 1968, where they had a top 30 hit single, "Does Your Mama Know About Me". As a producer and solo artist, Bobby Taylor contributed to several other soul recordings, both inside and outside of Motown. Taylor is most notable for discovering and mentoring the Jackson 5. Tommy Chong was a member of Bobby Taylor & the Vancouvers before he became famous as a comedian.

== Career ==
Bobby Taylor was born Robert Edward Taylor on February 18, 1934, in Washington, D.C. and was raised there. As a young man, he moved to New York City and sang in doo-wop groups with singers who later joined successful acts such as Frankie Lymon & the Teenagers and Little Anthony and the Imperials. In 1958, he began his music career as a member of the Four Pharaohs, who released a few locally-selling recordings in the Columbus, Ohio area.

In the early 1960s, while they were in San Francisco, Taylor met Little Daddy and the Bachelors, made up of vocalist Tommie Melton, guitarist Tommy Chong, bassist Wes Henderson, pianist Bernie Sneed, and drummer Floyd Sneed (later the drummer for Three Dog Night). While in Calgary they were known as the Calgary Shades. The word Shades in the group's name referenced the fact that the band was interracial. Chong (later famous as one-half of comedy duo Cheech and Chong) is half Chinese. The other members were Black, white, and Aboriginal. Taylor was of Black, Puerto Rican, and Native American heritage.

Little Daddy & the Bachelors recorded a single, "Too Much Monkey Business" / "Junior's Jerk". Melton and Chong performed a Vancouver dance hall in 1962 called the Blues Palace, a former movie theatre, opening for Ike & Tina Turner.

Although Little Daddy & the Bachelors built up a small following, things soured when they went with Chong's suggestion and had themselves billed as "Four Niggers and a Chink"—or, bowing to pressure, "Four N's and a C"—before taking on the moniker Bobby Taylor & the Vancouvers.

=== Bobby Taylor & the Vancouvers join Motown ===
In 1965, Supremes members Florence Ballard and Mary Wilson heard the band—whose repertoire consisted primarily of Motown covers—at the Elegant Parlour in Vancouver, and alerted Motown CEO Berry Gordy Jr. Gordy brought the Vancouvers to Motown Records in Detroit, Michigan, and signed them to his Gordy Records imprint. By this time the evolving lineup consisted of Taylor, Henderson, and Chong along with guitarist Eddie Patterson, organist Robbie King, and drummer Duris Maxwell (aka Ted Lewis), the latter three having come as a package when the original Vancouvers merged with another local group, the Good Shepherds. Claims have been made that future star guitarist Jimi Hendrix played with them in those early days, but Chong has been quoted as saying that any such appearance is a product of Taylor's "imagination." Hendrix and Taylor knew each other from their early days in the Seattle-Tacoma area and Hendrix's summers with his grandmother in Vancouver. Hendrix later jammed onstage with the Vancouvers in Europe.

The group recorded its debut album, an eponymous release, and their debut single, the Tommy Chong co-composition "Does Your Mama Know About Me," peaked at number 29 on the Billboard Hot 100 the week of May 25, 1968, and #44 in Canada.

For a July, 1968, engagement at the Regal Theater in Chicago, Bobby Taylor & the Vancouvers had a local-area family band, the Jackson 5, as their opening act. Impressed with the group, Taylor personally brought them to Detroit and the Motown offices, arranging an audition for them with Motown executive Suzanne de Passe. De Passe and Berry Gordy were impressed with the Jacksons, and the group was signed to the label within a year.

They released two further singles, "I Am Your Man," (US #85, US R&B #40, Can. #80) produced by Nickolas Ashford and Valerie Simpson, and the Smokey Robinson-written and produced "Malinda" (US #48, US R&B #16, Can. #59), which would appear on their 1968 studio album. The Vancouvers performed in support of Motown artist Chris Clark. However, Clark and Motown producer Johnny Bristol fired Chong and Henderson for missing a gig to apply for green cards. The group broke up shortly afterwards, when Chong attempted to have the Vancouvers' contract halved, so that he, Taylor, and Henderson would constitute the group, while Robbie King, Eddie Patterson, and Ted Lewis would simply be regarded as sidemen and session artists. Taylor auditioned for the then-vacant lead singer position in the Temptations (following David Ruffin's expulsion from the group), but was turned down.

=== Taylor on his own ===
Bobby Taylor
- Born: Robert Edward Taylor; February 18, 1934
- Origin: Washington, D.C., United States
- Died: July 22, 2017 (aged 83); Hong Kong
- Genres: R&B, soul
- Years active: 1958–1973
- Labels: Gordy (Motown), V.I.P. (Motown), MoWest (Motown), Tommy Zs7, Sunflower, Playboy

After the Jackson 5 signed to Motown in March 1969, Taylor became the group's first producer. He supervised the bulk of their first album, Diana Ross Presents The Jackson 5, recording the Jacksons on a number of soul covers, including the Miracles' "Who's Lovin' You". Berry Gordy would later move the group to California and take personal control of their sound. Although Taylor would briefly join the Jacksons in California, he did not receive credit for working on the group's early singles such as "I Want You Back" and "ABC" alongside Gordy's team known as the Corporation. In addition to those, he produced most of their covers of older rhythm and blues songs.

As a solo artist, Taylor was shifted to Motown's V.I.P. label and continued as a solo artist. Although his "Oh, I've Been Blessed" later attained a cult following, Taylor's solo singles failed to sell well. By 1971, Taylor had departed Motown because of a financial dispute, recording sporadically into the mid-1970s.

Taylor later successfully sued Motown. Moving to the United Kingdom, Taylor started an offshoot group, Bobby Taylor & the New Vancouvers, and recorded an album for Ian Levine's Motorcity Records. By 1990, Taylor had left the music world, but he returned for a one-off performance and Q&A in 1998.

Later in life, Taylor suffered from throat cancer, which he had treated by various holistic doctors.

On July 22, 2017, Bobby Taylor died in Hong Kong, aged 83.

== Bobby Taylor & the Vancouvers discography ==
All items issued on Gordy Records unless otherwise noted.

=== Singles ===
- 1968: "Does Your Mama Know About Me" (US #29, US R&B #5)
- 1968: "I Am Your Man" (US #85, US R&B 40)
- 1968: "Malinda" (US #48, US R&B #16)

=== Albums ===
- 1968: Bobby Taylor & the Vancouvers
- 1990: Find My Way Back (Motorcity Records)

== Bobby Taylor solo discography ==
- 1969: "Oh, I've Been Bless'd" (V.I.P. Records)
- 1969: "My Girl Has Gone" (Gordy Records)
- 1970: "Blackmail" (V.I.P. Records, promo-only)
- 1971: "Hey Lordy" (Mowest Records)
- 1972: "There Are Roses Somewhere In The World" (Sunflower Records)
- 1973: "I Can't Quit Your Love" (Tommy Zs7 Records)
- 1973: "Why Play Games" (Playboy Records) (US R&B #83)
- 1973: "I Can't Quit Your Love" (Philadelphia International, by "BT & TB"—Bobby Taylor and Thom Bell).

=== Albums ===
- 1969: Taylor Made Soul (Gordy Records)
- 2006: Motown Anthology (Hip-O/Select)
