= Morning, Noon & the Nite-Liters =

Morning, Noon & The Nite-Liters

Studio album by The Nite-Liters
- Released: 1971
- Recorded: 1971
- Studio: RCA's Mid-America Center, Chicago, Illinois
- Genre: Soul; funk
- Label: RCA
- Producer: Harvey Fuqua

The Nite-Liters chronology
Nite-Liters (1970)	Morning, Noon & The Nite-Liters (1971)	Instrumental Directions (1972)

Professional ratings
Review scores
Source	Rating
AllMusic	2.5/5 stars

Morning, Noon & the Nite-Liters is the second album by the Louisville, Kentucky group The Nite-Liters, the instrumental ensemble offshoot of New Birth, featuring Tony Churchill, James Baker, Robin Russell, Austin Lander, Robert "Lurch" Jackson, Leroy Taylor, Charlie Hearndon, Bruce Marshall and Nathaniel "Nebs" Neblett.

The album was released in 1971 on RCA Records and produced by mentor Harvey Fuqua. It includes the original version of "K-Jee" that was covered in 1975 by MFSB on their Universal Love album.

== Track listing ==
1. "Tanga Boo Gonk" (3:15)
2. "If I Were Your Woman" (5:36)
3. "K-Jee" (4:01)
4. "Funky-Doo" (4:52)
5. "Stinkin' Charlie" (2:19)
6. "Hang-Up" (4.39)
7. "Traveling/Listen Here" (4:17)
8. "We've Only Just Begun" (3:14)
9. "Kool-Pick" (3:24)
10. "(We've Got To) Pull Together" (5:43)

== Charts ==
Chart (1971)	Peak position
US Billboard Top LPs	167
US Top Soul LPs	31

=== Singles ===
Year	Single	Chart positions	
Year	Single	US	US R&B
1971	"K-Jee"	39	17
