= The High Bar Gang =

Canadian musical group

- Origin: Vancouver, British Columbia, Canada
- Genres: Bluegrass
- Years active: 2010–present
- Label: True North Records
- Members: David Barber; Kirby Barber; Rob Becker; Barney Bentall; Wendy Bird; Colin Nairne; Shari Ulrich
- Past members: Angela Harris; Eric Reed
- Website: http://www.highbargang.com/

The High Bar Gang is a Canadian bluegrass band, based in Vancouver.

The band has been popular in their home province of British Columbia selling out many of their shows, and were asked to open for Blue Rodeo when they played in Vancouver. They were also nominated for a Juno Award in 2014 in the category "Contemporary Christian/Gospel Album of the Year", and won "Vocal Group of the Year" at the 2014 Canadian Folk Music Awards.

In April 2015, Dave and Kirby Barber joined the group. The band has since performed at Vancouver Island MusicFest, Harrison Festival and the 2015 PanAmerica Games in Toronto.

== Biography ==
According to the band's web site, Colin Nairne brought the group together in 2010 to play his favourite bluegrass songs. Nairne was an original member of Barney Bentall and the Legendary Hearts, so Bentall must have seemed an obvious choice.

Bentall, Wendy Bird, Angela Harris, Eric Reed, and Rob Becker also perform together as Barney Bentall & The Grand Cariboo Opry. The Grand Cariboo Opry is a charity event that Bentall has been hosting since about 2006, doing several performances a year throughout western Canada.

== Discography ==
=== Albums ===
- Lost and Undone: A Gospel Bluegrass Companion - 2013
- Someday The Heart Will Trouble the Mind - 2016
