= Instrumental Directions =

Studio album by The Nite-Liters
- Released: 1972
- Recorded: 1972
- Studio: RCA's Studio C, New York City, New York
- Genre: Soul; funk
- Label: RCA
- Producer: Harvey Fuqua

The Nite-Liters chronology
Morning, Noon & the Nite-Liters (1971)	Instrumental Directions (1972)	Different Strokes (1972)

Instrumental Directions is the third album by Louisville, Kentucky group The Nite-Liters, the instrumental ensemble offshoot of New Birth, featuring Tony Churchill, James Baker, Robin Russell, Austin Lander, Robert "Lurch" Jackson, Leroy Taylor, Charlie Hearndon, Bruce Marshall, and Nathaniel "Nebs" Neblett.

The album was released in 1972 on RCA Records and produced by mentor Harvey Fuqua. "Cherish Every Precious Moment" was first featured on their debut album but released as a single in 1971.

== Track listing ==
1. "Theme from Shaft" (Isaac Hayes) - 4:16
2. "Brand X" (James Baker) - 4:43
3. "Them (Changes)" (Buddy Miles) - 4:45
4. "Respect to the Other Man" (Johnny Baylor, Johnny Northern, Luther Ingram, Randall Stewart) - 5:00
5. "Cherish Every Precious Moment" (Vernon Bullock) - 3:00
6. "Afro-Strut" (Harvey Fuqua, Charles Hearndon) - 2:50
7. Medley: "McArthur Park, What's Going On, Fuqua's Theme" (Jimmy Webb/Marvin Gaye, Al Cleveland, Renaldo Benson/Harvey Fuqua) - 4:55
8. "I've Got Dreams to Remember" (Joe Rock, Otis Redding, Zelma Redding) - 3:15
9. "Wichita Lineman" (Jimmy Webb) - 5:05
10. "Bakers Instant" (James Baker) - 3:39

== Charts ==
Chart (1972)	Peak position
US Top LPs	198
US Top Soul LPs	41
