= Duris Maxwell =

Canadian drummer (1946–2020)

- Born: William Edward Elgin Lewis; June 15, 1946; East York, Ontario, Canada
- Died: November 25, 2020 (aged 74) Sechelt, British Columbia
- Genre: Rock
- Occupation: Drummer
- Years active: 1960–2020

Duris Maxwell (born William Edward Elgin Lewis; 15 June 1946 – 25 November 2020) was a Canadian drummer who had played with many bands, including Bobby Taylor & the Vancouvers, Powder Blues Band, Doucette, The Temptations, Jefferson Airplane, and Skylark. He had also played on the albums Dreamboat Annie by Heart and Ki by Devin Townsend.

== Biography ==
Duris Maxwell (Mohawk) (known as Ted Lewis until his legal name change in 1970) was born June 15, 1946, in East York, Ontario. His family moved to Vancouver in 1948. His mother was a pianist and his father played fiddle and guitar, and he began playing drums as a pre-schooler. He first began touring with Evan Kemp and the Trail Riders in 1960 at the age of 14. Around this time he began to study with drum instructor Jim Blackley. His previous drum instructors were Vic Luff and Val Mock.

In the 1960s, Maxwell played with Little Daddy and the Bachelors (with Tommy Chong), The Chessmen, The Good Shepherds - three members of whom (Robbie King, Ed Patterson, and Maxwell) became half of Bobby Taylor & the Vancouvers. Signed to Motown in 1967 they recorded one album that was produced by Berry Gordy and toured the United States, with one trip to London, England where Jimi Hendrix joined them onstage at either the Speakeasy or the Marquee.

In the 1970s, he played and recorded with Jefferson Airplane and Skylark, and formed the bands Brahman and Genni Maxwell and Country Love. He did session work for many bands, including one track for Heart's Dreamboat Annie. He also recorded part or all of the following albums for The Irish Rovers; Alexis Rose Radlin; Dixon House; Jason Hoover; and Mama Let Him Play.

Through the late 1970s and mid-1980s, Maxwell recorded albums with Doucette, Powder Blues, Trooper (Money Talks) and The Jim Byrnes Band.

In 1987, Maxwell put his musical career on hold to begin a 5 1/2-year quest for a law degree. It began at the Native Education Centre, then the University of British Columbia as an undergrad; then the University of Saskatchewan College of Law; and finally three years at the University of British Columbia Faculty of Law. He received his law degree from the University of British Columbia in 1993, but did not pursue a law career.

He began playing full-time again in 2001. His first gig after a 13-year "break" was Ron Irving's Into The Blue CD. He then toured with Nigel Mack, moved to Calgary, then Winnipeg where he recorded Muskrat Blues & Rock and Roll with Billy Joe Green - a CD that won 'Best Blues CD' at the Aboriginal Peoples Choice Music Awards.

In Calgary, he played with Johnny V and recorded the 17-song CD Agnostically Eclectic. Maxwell also recorded Awakenings with Guy Chaput's Sci-fi Band.

Back in British Columbia, Maxwell joined The George Leach and recorded one CD released in the summer of 2009. He also played on Devin Townsend's album Ki.

Maxwell was active as a session and touring player. He also provided teaching workshops and private instruction - with a focus on First Nations students as well as "troubled" youth.

Maxwell died from heart failure at his home in Sechelt, British Columbia, on November 25, 2020, at the age of 74.

== Discography ==
- Bobby Taylor & the Vancouvers - Bobby Taylor & the Vancouvers, 1968
- Skylark - Skylark, 1972
- Skylark - 2, 1974
- Heart - Dreamboat Annie, 1975
- Jerry Doucette - Mama Let Him Play, 1977
- Jerry Doucette - The Douce is Loose, 1979
- Powder Blues Band - Uncut, 1979
- Powder Blues Band - Thirsty Ears, 1981
- Powder Blues Band - Party Line, 1982
- Powder Blues Band - Red Hot/True Blue, 1983
- Jim Byrnes - I Turned My Nights Into Days, 1987
- Devin Townsend Project - Ki, 2009
