= Barney Bentall and the Legendary Hearts =

Canadian rock band formed 1980

- Origin: Vancouver, British Columbia, Canada
- Genres: Rock
- Years active: 1980–present
- Label: Epic
- Members: Barney Bentall; Jack Guppy; Colin Nairne; Cam Bowman; Mike Crozier; Dave Reimer
- Past members: Barry Muir
- Website: http://www.barneybentall.com

Barney Bentall and the Legendary Hearts are a Canadian rock band, based out of Vancouver, British Columbia, that formed in 1980. The band's name was taken from the title of Lou Reed's 1983 album.

== Biography ==
Bentall's first group was Brandon Wolf, a pseudonym he also used, which formed in 1978 with the original line-up consisting of: Bentall (lead vocals, keyboards, rhythm guitar), Doug McFetridge (guitar), Kevin Swain (bass) and Derek Morrison (drums) and which later changed to: Brad Kilburn (bass), Wilf Froese (keyboards) and Jack Guppy (drums). With songs written by Bentall and long-time childhood friend and songwriting partner Gary Fraser (who sometimes wrote using the pseudonym Robert Arrow), as well as McFetridge and Swain, they self-released "Excerpt from the Montmartre Letters", a 4-track 45 rpm EP in 1979. This record was followed by "Not Guilty", a 5-track EP released in 1980 on A&M Records, that had modest success in Western Canada. In 1982, Brandon Wolf recorded and released Losing Control, a 13-song LP, on their own label, Possible Worlds Records.

Reverting to his real name in 1984, Bentall, together with Guppy, Nairne, bassist Barry Muir, and keyboardist Cam Bowman, recorded demos produced by noted producer Bob Rock. In 1988, Bentall, Guppy, Nairne, Muir and Bowman, by then known as Barney Bentall & The Legendary Hearts, had a breakthrough when they landed a recording contract with Epic/CBS Records after releasing a video for "Something to Live For" on MuchMusic in 1987. The self-titled debut album, which featured three hit Canadian singles including "Something to Live For", "House of Love (is Haunted)" and "Come Back to Me", reached platinum status in Canada (100,000 records sold). After the record was released bassist David Reimer joined the band, taking over for Muir. In 1989, the group won a Juno Award for "Most Promising Group of the Year". In 1990, Bentall, Fraser and Nairne were nominated for a Genie Award for "Restless Dreamer", a song they wrote which appeared on the soundtrack to the Sandy Wilson film American Boyfriends.

The band would release four more albums on Epic and later Sony Records, achieving more hits with "Crime Against Love", "Life Could Be Worse", "Livin' in the 90s", "Doin' Fine", "Do Ya", and "Shattered". Throughout the late '80s and early '90s the band toured extensively across Canada and into the U.S. After their last album in 1997, the group quietly disbanded. Bentall would take a lengthy break to work his ranch in the Cariboo region of BC, before returning with a solo album Gift Horse in 2006.

Despite solo projects, Barney Bentall and the Legendary Hearts continue to play the occasional gig together. Fraser is a litigator in Vancouver, and Bowman is a plastic surgeon, also in Vancouver.

== Discography ==
=== Albums ===
[ as Brandon Wolf ]

- Excerpts from the Montmartre Letters (EP) - 1979
- Not Guilty (EP) - 1980
- Losing Control (EP) - 1980

[ as Barney Bentall and the Legendary Hearts ]

- Barney Bentall and the Legendary Hearts - 1988
- Lonely Avenue - 1990
- Ain't Life Strange - 1992
- Gin Palace - 1995
- Greatest Hits 1986-1996 - 1996
- Till Tomorrow - 1997
- Unsung - 2009

=== Singles ===
- "Something to Live For" - 1987 #17 CAN
- "Come Back to Me" - 1988
- "House of Love (Is Haunted)" - 1988
- "She's My Inspiration" - 1989 #30 CAN
- "Crime Against Love" - 1990 #11 CAN
- "Life Could Be Worse" - 1991 #24 CAN
- "I Gotta Go" - 1991 #29 CAN
- "Nothing Hurts (Like the Words of the One You Love)" - 1991
- "Livin' in the '90s" - 1992 #11 CAN
- "Doin' Fine" - 1992
- "If This is Love" - 1993 #30 CAN
- "Belly of the Sun" - 1993
- "Family Man" - 1993
- "Do Ya" - 1995
- "I'm Shattered" - 1995 #7 CAN
- "Oh Shelly" - 1996 #32 CAN
- "Gin Palace" - 1996 #14 CAN
- "Be Inside You" - 1997
- "You Should Be Having Fun" - 1997
- "Shoulder of the Road" - 1997
