= Dream Merchant =

R&B ballad written by Larry Weiss and Jerry Ross

Single by New Birth

from the album Blind Baby
- B-side: "Why Did I"
- Released: June 28, 1975
- Recorded: 1975
- Length: 3:20
- Label: Buddah
- Songwriters: Larry Weiss, Jerry Ross

New Birth singles chronology
"It's Been a Long Time" (1974)	"Dream Merchant" (1975)	"Grandaddy (Part 1)" (1975)

Dream Merchant is a R&B ballad written by Larry Weiss and Jerry Ross. The song was originally recorded by Jerry Butler in 1967 as "Mr. Dream Merchant". The Jerry Butler version reached #23 on the soul chart, #38 on the Hot 100, and #45 in Canada.

== Cover versions ==
- In 1967 Madeline Bell covered "Mr. Dream Merchant" on her first album, Bell's a Poppin'.
- Dusty Springfield included a version of the song on her 1968 album Dusty... Definitely.
- In 1975 the song was remade by Louisville, Kentucky-based group New Birth. Their version was the group's only #1 hit on the soul chart and one of three songs to make the top 10 on that chart; it was one of two New Birth entries to hit the Top 40, reaching #36 on the pop chart.
