= Skylark (Canadian band) =

Canadian pop/rock band

- Origin: Vancouver, Canada
- Genres: Pop rock; blue-eyed soul
- Years active: 1971–1973
- Label: Capitol
- Past members: B. J. Cook; Donny Gerrard; Flip Arellano; David Foster; Carl Graves; Robbie King; Eddie Patterson; Steven Pugsley; Doug Edwards; Gaye Delorme; Duris Maxwell; Brian Hilton; Kat Hendrikse; Norman McPherson; John Verner; Allan Mix

Skylark was a Canadian pop and rock band active from 1971 to 1973 and based in Vancouver. "Wildflower" is their biggest hit.

== History ==
Skylark formed in 1971 from one of Ronnie Hawkins's backup groups and signed with Capitol Records, releasing a self-titled album in 1972 which spawned three singles. The group, whose alumni include composer/arranger David Foster, disbanded after the mediocre reception of their second album. Two of its other members, Donny Gerrard and Carl Graves, achieved mixed success in other projects.

Their biggest single, "Wildflower", was a 1973 number #1 hit in Canada on the RPM Adult Contemporary chart. It reached number 10 on the Canadian RPM singles chart and peaked at number 9 on the Billboard Hot 100 that spring, selling over a million copies. It was written by guitarist Doug Edwards, and Dave Richardson, who was a Victoria police officer at the time. The song's popularity was boosted by frequent play on CKLW-AM radio after its initial release.

Donny Gerrard was among the Canadian musicians who recorded the 1985 charity single for African famine relief entitled "Tears Are Not Enough". He sang his solo line with Bryan Adams.

Doug Edwards died on November 11, 2016. Donny Gerrard died from cancer in February 2022, at the age of 75.

== Former members ==
- B. J. Cook, Donny Gerrard, & Flip Arellano - vocals
- David Foster - keyboards
- Carl Graves - percussion
- Robbie King - Hammond organ
- Eddie Patterson, Doug Edwards, & Gaye Delorme - guitars
- Steven Pugsley - bass
- Duris Maxwell - drums
- Brian Hilton - drums (replaced Maxwell)
- Kat Hendrikse - drums (replaced Hilton)
- Norman McPherson - guitar (replaced Edwards)
- John Verner - guitar (replaced McPherson in 1972)
- Allan Mix - guitar (replaced Verner in 1973)

== Discography ==
=== Charted singles ===
| Year | Name | Peak chart positions | | | | | | | | Album |
| Year | Name | CAN | CAN AC | CANCON | US | US AC | AUS | NET | US R&B | Album |
|---|---|---|---|---|---|---|---|---|---|---|
| 1972 | "What Would I Do Without You" | 60 | 77 | — | — | — | — | — | — | Skylark |
| 1973 | "Wildflower" | 10 | 1 | 15 | 9 | 5 | 65 | 23 | — | Skylark |
| 1973 | "I'll Have to Go Away" | 83 | 54 | — | 106 | 39 | — | — | — | Skylark |
| 1973 | "If That's the Way You Want It" | — | — | — | — | — | — | — | 55 | 2 |
"—" denotes a recording that did not chart or was not released in that territory.

== Albums ==
=== 1972 - Skylark (Capitol) ===
(number 53 in Canada)

==== Track listing ====
Side 1

1. "Brother Eddie" (Howie Vickers, Joe Fahrni, Robbie King) - 4:31
2. "What Would I Do Without You" (Ernie Shelby, Phillip Mitchell) - 3:29
3. "A Long Way to Go" (Barry Mann, Cynthia Weil) - 3:46
4. "Suites for My Lady" (David Foster, Duris Maxwell) - 2:06
5. "I'll Have to Go Away" (Kerry Chater, Renée Armand) - 5:07

Side 2

6. "The Writing's on the Wall" (Domenic Troiano) - 3:01
7. "Twenty-Six Years" (David Foster, Donny Gerrard, Linda Patterson) - 4:55
8. "I'm in Love Again" (Fats Domino, Dave Bartholomew) - 3:18
9. "Wildflower" (David Richardson, Doug Edwards) - 4:08
10. "Shall I Fail" (Carolyn Borsman, Doug Edwards) - 1:27

==== Personnel ====
- Donny Gerrard - lead and backing vocals
- B. J. Cook - lead and backing vocals, percussion
- Kitty Ditto - backing vocals
- Patrice Holloway - backing vocals
- Doug Edwards - electric and acoustic guitars
- David Foster - acoustic and electric pianos, harpsichord, Moog synthesizer, string arrangements (all but 3)
- Steve Pugsley - bass
- Duris Maxwell - drums, percussion
- Bobby Torres - congas
- Jimmie Haskell - string arrangements (3)
- Robbie King - organ (8), arrangements (8)

=== 1974 - 2 (Capitol) ===
1. "You Remind Me of a Friend" (Brian Russell, Brenda Gordon) 3:20
2. "Love's a River Flowing" (Roger Nichols, John Bettis) 3:58
3. "It's a Wonder" (Alexandra Wangberg) 3:14
4. "Wingless Bird" (D. Edwards, C. Borsman) 5:07
5. "Wildflower" (D. Richardson, D. Edwards) 4:08
6. "If That's the Way You Want It" (Dennis Lambert, Brian Potter) 3:38
7. "Foster Frees" (David Foster) 6:19
8. "The Love Affair Is Over" (Bob Ruzicka) 3:15
9. "One More Mountain to Climb" (Neil Sedaka, Howard Greenfield) 5:04

==== Personnel ====
- Produced and engineered by Eirik the Norwegian.
- Arrangements and production coordination by David Foster

Members of Skylark:

- Donny Gerrard - lead vocals, backing vocal arrangements
- B. J. Cook Foster - lead and backing vocals
- David Foster - piano, electric piano, Moog and pipe organ

Other musicians:

- Steve Pugsley - bass
- Alan Mix - guitar
- Brian Hilton, Duris Maxwell - drums
- Carl Graves - backing vocals, percussion
- Gabriel Delorme (aka Gaye Delorme) - acoustic guitar
- Robbie King - organ (tracks 2, 6, 7)
- William Smith - organ (track 9)
- Bobby Taylor - backing vocals

== See also ==
- List of 1970s one-hit wonders in the United States
