= The New Birth (album) =

Studio album by New Birth
- Released: November 1, 1970
- Recorded: 1970
- Studio: RCA's Mid-America Recording Center (Chicago)
- Genre: R&B; funk; psychedelic soul
- Length: 31:47
- Label: RCA; Sony
- Producer: Harvey Fuqua

New Birth chronology
The New Birth (1970)	Ain't No Big Thing, But It's Growing (1971)

Professional ratings
Review scores
Source	Rating
AllMusic	4/5 stars

The New Birth is the debut album by the American R&B and funk band New Birth. It was released on November 1, 1970, in North America by RCA and produced by mentor Harvey Fuqua, whose style of building a whole song around a simple phrase is represented by "The Unh Song", and his uncredited assistant Vernon Bullock.

== Album background ==
The New Birth was as much a concept as it was a group, as it consisted of the instrumental group The Nite-Liters, (already famous for the song "K-Jee"), who during their height, consisted of James Baker, Robin Russell, Leroy Taylor, Charlie Hearndon, Tony Churchill, Austin Lander, Robert "Lurch" Jackson, (and, at this point, Johnny Graham, though they would later add Carl McDaniel), female vocalists, The Mint Juleps (which featured Londee Loren (Wiggins), Tanita Gaines, Janice Carter and Pam Swent), male vocalists, The New Sounds (Bobby Downs, Ronald Coleman, Gary Martin Young and George "Slim" House) plus additional vocalist Allen Frye, who also doubled on percussion.

== Track listing ==
No.	Title	Writer(s)	Length
1.	"What'll I Do"	Vernon Bullock; Harvey Fuqua; Robert Wilson	3:09
2.	"UNH Song"	Bullock; Fuqua	3:12
3.	"All the Way"	Sammy Cahn; James Van Huesen	3:13
4.	"It's All in the Game"	Charles Dawes; Carl Sigman	2:49
5.	"Pretty Words Don't Mean a Thing (Lie to Me)"	Fuqua; Kenny Hawkins; The Nite-Liters	2:36
6.	"Do the Funky Chicken"	Rufus Thomas	4:00
7.	"Brand New Lover"	Bullock; Fuqua	4:29
8.	"You Don't Have to Be Alone"	Bullock; Fuqua	3:18
9.	"One Way Bus"	Tex Bristow; Fuqua; Harold Sparks	2:41
10.	"It's You or No One"	Cahn; Jule Style	3:01
