= Robbie King (musician) =

Canadian musician (1947–2003)

- Born: Robert Glenn King; May 27, 1947; Malartic, Quebec, Canada
- Died: October 17, 2003 (aged 56) British Columbia, Canada
- Genres: Pop
- Occupation: Musician
- Instrument: Hammond Organ
- Formerly of: Bobby Taylor & the Vancouvers; Skylark; The Hometown Band; Cal Batchelor Band; Terry Edmunds Band

Robbie King (born Robert Glenn King; May 27, 1947 – October 17, 2003) was a Canadian musician, associated with many national and international acts. He was most associated with his playing of the Hammond organ.

== History ==
Born in Malartic, Quebec, on May 27, 1947, King came from a musical family. His mother Clarice played piano in his father's regional big band, Bob King and His Queens, an all-female band particularly popular in the 1940s. Returning from an engagement, King's father was killed in a car accident, which also badly injured both King and his mother.

King's career as a professional musician began as a member of Bobby Taylor & the Vancouvers, which also included drummer Duris Maxwell. King and Maxwell developed a forty-year friendship that continued until King's death.

Bobby Taylor & the Vancouvers were signed to the Gordy label of Motown Records. Based on that relationship, King later joined the studio musicians associated with Motown Records. In addition to contributing to various Motown recordings, King toured with The Supremes, among other Motown acts.

King later was a founding member of Skylark, a band that included David Foster. Skylark is most closely associated with the hit song "Wildflower", which has been the subject of multiple cover versions.

Following Skylark, King was a founding member of The Hometown Band. He also played the organ part for the instrumental "Apache" recorded by The Incredible Bongo Band in 1973.

King settled in Vancouver, British Columbia, Canada and became a studio musician, playing keyboards on Bryan Adams' Into The Fire and Waking Up the Neighbours albums. He also spent approximately 20 years, starting in 1980, as a member of the Cal Batchelor Band and the Terry Edmunds Band 1985–2003. Batchelor, as a member of Quiver, had previously been associated with the Sutherland Brothers.

King died from throat cancer on October 17, 2003, at the age of 56.
