= Doug Edwards (musician) =

Canadian musician

- Born: Douglas Fraser Edwards; March 15, 1946; Edmonton, Alberta, Canada
- Died: November 11, 2016 (aged 70) Vancouver, British Columbia, Canada
- Genres: Pop
- Occupation: Musician
- Instruments: Guitar, bass

Douglas Fraser Edwards (March 15, 1946 – November 11, 2016) was a Canadian musician, composer and multi-instrumentalist best known for co-creating the hit song "Wildflower" for the pop/rock band Skylark. He was also part of The Hometown Band and later was bassist for Vancouver band Chilliwack.

== Early life ==
Edwards was born in Edmonton, Alberta to Dr. William Edwards and Muriel (née Brown) and learned piano from a young age.

His father was a doctor who frequently moved the family around to Saskatchewan and England for brief periods of time. Eventually they moved to Victoria, British Columbia when Edwards was a teenager, which was around the time he began to learn electric guitar and bass. He began playing in bands while in high school in Victoria.

== Music career ==
Edwards moved to Vancouver to join a band called The Villains, which had a regular gig at a night-club called Oil Can Harry's. He then toured with The 5th Dimension where he took on a role as session musician. Eventually that led him to join the band for television appearances on The Ed Sullivan Show and secured an opening gig for Frank Sinatra and the Harry James Orchestra in Las Vegas.

As his career continued, Edwards began to look for other opportunities. He met singer B.J. Cook and David Foster, the latter of whom had just exited Ronnie Hawkins’s band and was looking to forge his next career step with Skylark.

=== "Wildflower" creation and release ===
Edwards came across the blueprints for "Wildflower" almost by chance. Lyrics for the song were originally penned by Dave Richardson, a police officer in Saanich, British Columbia, who was good friends with Foster. He had sent a pile of poems over to him in hopes that Skylark might find inspiration for a song. Foster asked Edwards to sift through the pile, which is when he found the words to "Wildflower" and started to poke away at a melody on a Hammond organ.

The song appeared on the band's self-titled debut album and went gold in Canada and hit No. 9 on the U.S. Billboard charts. Edwards left the band before its breakup in 1975.

== Later career and death ==
He contributed to The Poppy Family's "Which Way You Goin', Billy?" in 1970. After Skylark broke up Edwards became a member of The Hometown Band, which released several albums in the late 1970s including one with folk singer Valdy.

When The Hometown Band broke up, Edwards returned to session work, contributing bass guitar to Glass Tiger's "Don't Forget Me (When I'm Gone)".

He played in the band Chilliwack until illness forced him to stop performing in early 2016. Edwards died of cancer in Vancouver, British Columbia, at the age of 70.
