= Shari Ulrich =

American-Canadian musician and songwriter (born 1951)

- Born: Sharon Ulrich; October 17, 1951 (age 74); San Rafael, California, U.S.
- Origin: British Columbia
- Genres: Folk, pop
- Occupations: Musician, songwriter
- Instruments: Violin, guitar, piano, mandolin, dulcimer, flute, saxophone, harmonica, cello, accordion
- Years active: 1973–present
- Labels: A&M, Esther, MCA, Borealis
- Formerly of: The Hometown Band, Valdy, UHF, BTU, The High Bar Gang, Pied Pumkin
- Website: shariulrich.com

Sharon "Shari" Ulrich (born 17 October 1951) is an American-Canadian musician and songwriter. She has also worked as a television host, actress, film composer, and educator. A multi-instrumentalist, she plays violin, mandolin, guitar, piano, and dulcimer.

She has been nominated for a Juno Award four times, winning "Most Promising Female Vocalist of the Year" in 1982. At the 15th Genie Awards in 1994, Ulrich, Graeme Coleman and David Graff received a Genie Award nomination for Best Original Song, for the song "Every Road", which appeared in the film Max.

== Early life ==
Ulrich was born in San Rafael, California, to Esther and Stanley Ulrich; she was the youngest of three children. Esther was proficient on piano, while Stanley (who worked in banking), played the recorder for relaxation. Shari picked up music early, playing violin at age nine. Stanley died when Shari was 10 years old, leaving Esther to raise their family as a single parent. Ulrich moved to British Columbia at the age of 18.

== Career ==
Ulrich performed on the coffeehouse circuit around Vancouver in the early 1970s. She performed with Rick Scott and JR (aka Rick) Stone as 'Shari, Scott and Stone'. Then in 1973 JR moved back to North Carolina, and Joe Mock took his place. The new configuration was called Pied Pumkin which first performed that year.

Ulrich toured with Valdy in 1976 as a member of The Hometown Band. After they disbanded in 1978, the same year they won the Juno Award for "Most Promising Group of the Year", she went solo, and won a 1981 Juno Award for "Most Promising Female Vocalist" and received Juno nominations in the following two years for "Best Female Vocalist".

Ulrich wrote for Sesame Street and composed theme music for several networks, including the CBC. In 1989, she formed the folk music group UHF along with Bill Henderson (Chilliwack) and Roy Forbes.

In 2009, Ulrich joined Barney Bentall and Tom Taylor and formed BTU (Bentall Taylor Ulrich), releasing the album "Live" at Cates Hill followed by the studio album Tightrope Walk.

Ulrich continues to perform solo (often accompanied by daughter Julia Graff on violin, piano, mandolin, guitar, accordion and vocals). Graff also engineered and produced Ulrich's 2014 release "Everywhere I Go" and Bentall Taylor Ulrich's 2016 "Tightrope Walk", and 2019's "Back to Shore" (co-produced and engineered by Julia's partner James Perrella). She tours occasionally with the Pied Pumkin, UHF, BTU, and the bluegrass group The High Bar Gang. She lives on Bowen Island, British Columbia.

== Personal life ==
Ulrich was married (1989–1996) to musician, songwriter and artist David Graff, Julia Graff's father, who performs in his band as well. She is also an audio engineer, music editor in film and television, and videographer. Shari also has a son, Oregon architect Mike Magee, who was put up for adoption in 1967, and with whom she reunited in 2009.

== Discography ==
=== Solo ===
- Long Nights, 1980. (A&M Records)
- One Step Ahead, 1981. (A&M Records)
- Talk Around Town, 1982. (MCA Records)
- Every Road, 1989. (Independent)
- The Best of Shari Ulrich, 1991. (Esther Records)
- The View from Here, 1998. (Esther Records)
- Find Our Way, 2010. (Esther Records)
- Everywhere I Go, 2014. (Borealis Records)
- Back to Shore, 2019. (Borealis Records)

=== Group ===
- The Pied Pumkin String Ensemble - Pied Pumkin, 1974. (Squash Records)
- Pie Pumkin Allah Mode - Pied Pumkin, 1976. (Squash Records)
- Flying - The Hometown Band, 1976. (A&M Records) (Re-released 2012)
- The Hometown Band - The Hometown Band, 1977. (A&M Records) (Re-released 2012)
- Pear of Pied Pumkin - Pied Pumkin, 1978. (Squash Records)
- The Lost Squash Tapes - Pied Pumkin 1988. (Squash Records)
- UHF - UHF, 1990. (Tangible Records)
- UHF II - UHF, 1995. (Tangible Records)
- Plucking DeVine - Pied Pumkin, 1998. (Squash Records)
- 'Live' at Cates Hill - Barney Bentall, Shari Ulrich, Tom Taylor, 2009. (Independent)
- Lost and Undone - The High Bar Gang, 2013. (True North Records)
- Tightrope Walk - Bentall Taylor Ulrich, 2016. (Borealis Records)
- Someday the Heart Will Trouble the Mind - The High Bar Gang, 2017. (True North Records)
