= Birth Day =

Fourth album by American funk and R&B collective New Birth

Studio album by New Birth
- Released: December 12, 1972
- Recorded: 1972
- Genre: R&B; funk; soul
- Label: RCA Records
- Producer: Harvey Fuqua

New Birth chronology
Coming Together (1972)	Birth Day (1972)	It's Been a Long Time (1973)

Professional ratings
Review scores
Source	Rating
AllMusic	3/5 stars

Birth Day is the fourth album by American funk and R&B collective New Birth, released in North America by RCA on December 12, 1972. The album was produced by Harvey Fuqua (and his uncredited assistant Vernon Bullock) and was the record that put the group on the map. Consisting of the backing group The Nite-Liters, the vocalists Love, Peace & Happiness (consisting of Ann Bogan, Leslie Wilson, and Melvin Wilson), Londee Loren (Wiggins), Bobby Downs, and Allen Frey. This would be the last album on which Ann Bogan would appear, as she succumbed to her mother's pressure to stop singing and raise her two children herself.

Starting out with the Leslie Wilson-led hit "I Can Understand It" (originally by Bobby Womack), they followed their trend of covers with an exceptional version of The Stylistics' "Stop, Look & Listen" and Buffy Sainte-Marie's "Until It's Time For You To Go", featuring future member of The Supremes Susaye Greene. When Fuqua was unable to get the performance he wanted out of Londee Loren, he got Susaye to do the vocals instead and released them under the New Birth.

The album also featured the funk jam "Got To Get A Knutt," which featured a play on words on various television commercial slogans.

== Track listing ==
1. "I Can Understand It" (Bobby Womack)
2. "Until It's Time for You to Go" (Buffy Sainte-Marie)
3. "Got to Get a Knutt" (New Birth)
4. "Theme from Buck and The Preacher" (Bogan, Carter, Harvey Fuqua, Saunders)
5. "Stop, Look, Listen (To Your Heart)" (Thom Bell, Linda Creed)
6. "Easy Evil" (O'Day)
7. "You Are What I'm All About" (Harvey Fuqua, Londie Wiggins)

== Chart performance ==
This was their breakthrough album, reaching number one on the R&B chart in the United States. The first single, "I Can Understand It", peaked at number four on the R&B singles chart in early 1973. The second single, "Until It's Time for You to Go", reached number twenty-one on the R&B chart.

Chart (1973)	Peak position
US Billboard Top LPs	31
US Billboard Top Soul LPs	1

=== Singles ===
Year	Single	Chart positions	
Year	Single	US	US R&B
1973	"I Can Understand It"	35	4
1973	"Until It's Time for You to Go"	97	21

== See also ==
- List of Billboard number-one R&B albums of 1973
