= Barney Bentall =

Canadian singer and songwriter (born 1956)

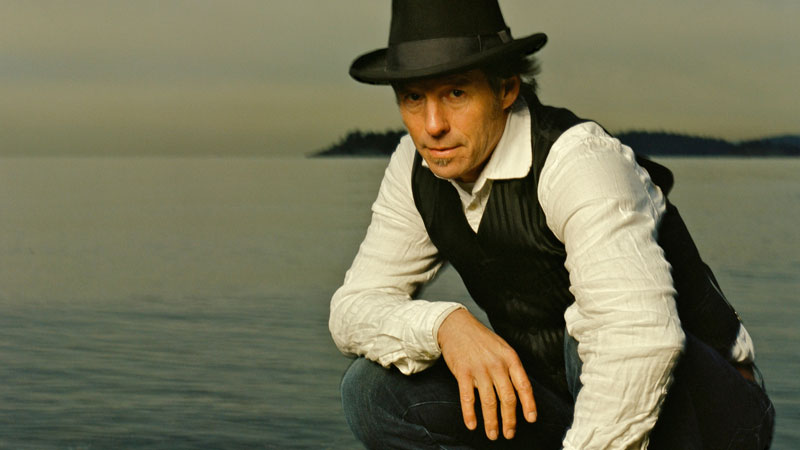
- Barney Bentall (2011)

Background information
- Born: Barnard Franklin Bentall; March 14, 1956 (age 70); Toronto, Ontario, Canada
- Genres: Rock
- Occupations: Singer, songwriter
- Instruments: Vocals, guitar
- Years active: 1979–present
- Labels: Epic, True North
- Website: www.barneybentall.ca

Barnard Franklin "Barney" Bentall (born March 14, 1956) is a Canadian pop/rock singer-songwriter who is most well known for his 1990s-era band, Barney Bentall and the Legendary Hearts. Their most successful Canadian singles included "Something to Live For", "Life Could Be Worse", "Crime Against Love", and "Come Back to Me". He has also recorded under the pseudonym Brandon Wolf.

== Early life ==
Bentall grew up in Calgary, Alberta, the son of a Baptist minister. His family once owned Dominion Construction and the Bentall Centre, in the downtown core of Vancouver, British Columbia.

== Career ==
Bentall recorded and toured with his band, the Legendary Hearts, for ten years. He then started a cattle ranch in 1997 in British Columbia. In 2006, he released his first solo album titled Gift Horse on True North Records on August 3, 2006. In 2008, he released a DVD of his live The Grand Cariboo Opry show, which included a 12-track audio CD.

In 2009, Bentall joined Shari Ulrich and Tom Taylor to release the album "Live" at Cates Hill.

Bentall teamed up with Ulrich again in 2010 to form The High Bar Gang, a bluegrass-styled band. The band features Shari Ulrich, Kirby Barber and Wendy Bird for vocal harmony along with Rob Becker, Colin Nairne, and David Barber.

In 2016, Bentall, Shari Ulrich and Tom Taylor, calling their trio "BTU", released an album of folk music, Tightrope Walk.

In 2017, Bentall released the western album The Drifter and The Preacher.

== Personal life ==
His son Dustin Bentall is also a professional musician, while his daughter Jessica Bentall is married to former NHL player Rob Niedermayer.

== Solo discography ==
Title	Album details
Gift Horse	Release date: August 22, 2006; Label: True North Records
The Grand Cariboo Opry	Release date: August 26, 2008; Label: Golden Cage Music
"Live" at Cates Hill (with Shari Ulrich and Tom Taylor)	Release date: April 14, 2009; Label: Esther Records
The Inside Passage	Release date: September 22, 2009; Label: True North Records
Flesh and Bone	Release date: November 13, 2012; Label: True North Records
Tightrope Walk (with Shari Ulrich and Tom Taylor)	Release date: February 12, 2016; Label: Borealis Records
The Drifter and The Preacher	Release date: October 13, 2017; Label: True North Records
