= Wildflower (Skylark song) =

1973 single by Skylark

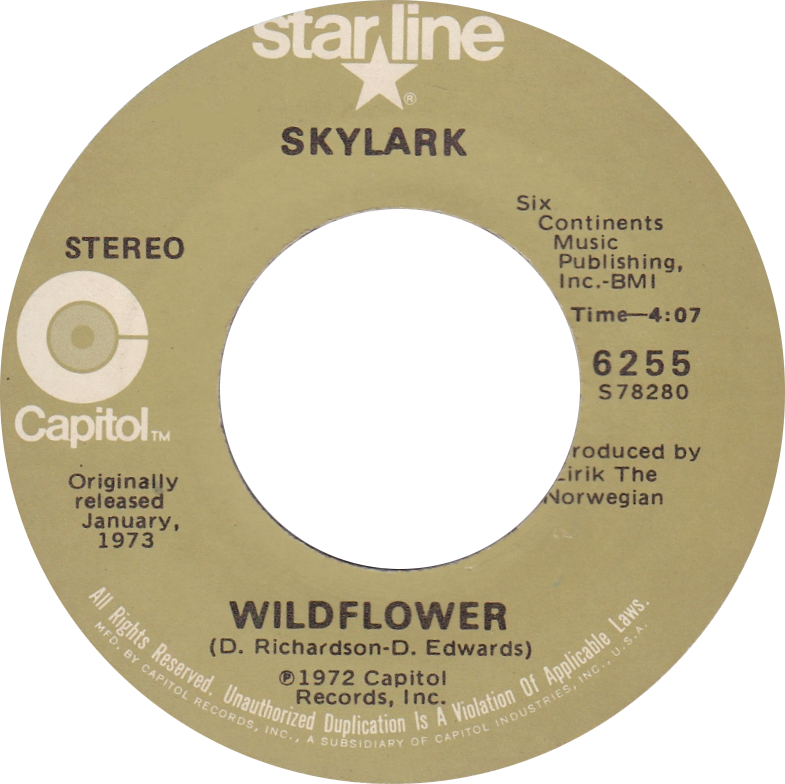
- Side A of a US reissue

Single by Skylark

from the album Skylark
- B-side: "The Writing's on the Wall"
- Released: February 1973
- Recorded: 1972
- Genre: soft rock, blue-eyed soul
- Length: 3:11 (Single Version); 4:12 (Album Version)
- Label: Capitol
- Songwriters: Doug Edwards; David Richardson
- Producer: Eirik Wangberg

Skylark singles chronology
"What Would I Do Without You" (1972)	"Wildflower" (1973)	"I'll Have to Go Away" (1973)

"Wildflower" is a song written by Doug Edwards and Dave Richardson in 1972. First performed by the Canadian band Skylark, it has been covered by many artists and more recently has been sampled in a number of hip hop songs.

The title, "Wildflower", is not mentioned in the song. The closest line to the title occurs as the final line of the repeated chorus: "She's a free and gentle flower growing wild".

== Skylark recording ==
Doug Edwards was a member of Skylark, and Dave Richardson was a friend of band member and organizer David Foster. Edwards composed "Wildflower" after reading a poem by Richardson; the song was included on the band's demo tape. Barry De Vorzon, by 1972 an established music business name, heard the demo tape and was convinced that the song would be a big hit. After the demo was rejected by several studios, an executive at Capitol Records signed the band, and the song—with Donny Gerrard doing the vocal—was included on their eponymous first album. The initial single released from the album was not successful. Rosalie Trombley, a music director at CKLW, a Canadian radio station in Windsor, Ontario, played "Wildflower", at that time an album cut, repeatedly for three months in an effort to satisfy the Canadian government's requirements for Canadian content. During that period, it was the only radio station in North America to have the song on its playlist. Capitol decided to release it in neighboring Detroit as a regional release, where it became a huge soul hit before breaking out nationally and crossing over to the pop charts. Eventually "Wildflower" spent 21 weeks on the Billboard pop chart. The song proved to be extremely popular in Canada as well; it ultimately peaked at #10 on the RPM Top Singles chart, and #1 on the Adult Contemporary chart. Total sales of the single exceeded one million copies, and it was included on their second album as well, at the request of Capitol Records executives who sought to capitalize on the song's success. Ultimately, it was their only single to chart in the United States.

The song was #68 in RPM's Top 100 CanCon songs 1964–1996.

== Music and lyrics ==
Words and music for "Wildflower" were written by Douglas Edwards and Thomas David Richardson. The song was originally published in the key of D minor and starts with Dm, Dm/C, G/B, Gm/Bb, Am, A, Dm, Dm/C, G/B, G, C7sus, C7, F, A, Dm, Dm/C, G/B, Bb chord progression with lyrics "She's faced the hardest times you could imagine, and many times her eyes fought back the tears. And when her youthful world was about to fall in...". The tempo of the score is "Slowly".

== Chart history ==
=== Weekly charts ===
Chart (1973)	Peak position
Australia (Kent Music Report)	65
Netherlands (Dutch Top 40)	23
Canada RPM	10
Canada RPM AC	1
U.S. Billboard Hot 100	9
U.S. Billboard Adult Contemporary	5

=== Year-end charts ===
Chart (1973)	Rank
Canada RPM	86
US Billboard Hot 100	25
US Cash Box Top 100	73

== Other versions ==
"Wildflower" has been covered by many artists, including:

- Color Me Badd
- Hank Crawford
- Johnny Mathis
- Lisa Fischer
- Creative Source
- Martin Nievera
- Marlena Shaw
- Lana Wolf
- K-Ci
- Silk
- Tyrese Gibson
- Gary Morris, whose version of the song was released as a single in 1986, and reached #21 on the RPM Adult Contemporary chart in February of that year.
- New Birth's rendition features enhancements to the original melody, including a more instrumentally complex introduction, later directly sampled in Jamie Foxx's hit song "Unpredictable," and a spoken monologue from lead singer Leslie Wilson during the bridge. This version became a bona fide hit in its own right, cracking the top 20 on the R&B singles chart in 1974.
- The O'Jays
- In 2017, it was covered by Arnel Pineda of Journey and serves as the main theme song of the TV drama series of the same title in the Philippines.

== Samples ==
- The Hank Crawford recording of "Wildflower" was sampled by Johnny J on 2Pac's song "Shorty Wanna Be a Thug", and by Kanye West and Paul Wall on their song "Drive Slow".
- This track was used by Eminem on Slim Shady EP in 1997 with the track "No One's Iller".
- The Hank Crawford cover was also more recently sampled by Boi-1da on Drake's 2010 single "Miss Me", which featured Lil Wayne, from his debut album Thank Me Later.
- In 2009, it was sampled by J. Cole for his track "Dreams" from his mixtape The Warm Up.

== See also ==
- List of 1970s one-hit wonders in the United States
