= Romantic Italian Songs =

Studio album by Sergio Franchi
- Released: September 1962
- Recorded: United Kingdom
- Genre: Traditional pop; Vocal
- Length: 34 minutes 41 seconds
- Label: RCA Victor Red Seal; M/2640

Sergio Franchi chronology
Romantic Italian Songs (1962)	Our Man From Italy (1963)

Romantic Italian Songs is the debut studio album by Italian singer Sergio Franchi, released in September 1962 by RCA Victor Red Seal mainly for the American market. The project was received well both critically and commercially.

== Background, recording and content ==
Franchi arrived in New York on September 25, 1962. Singing the full length of the concert without a microphone, a New York reviewer commented on Franchi's "big, healthy voice", his penchant for ad-libbing, and his ability to establish instant rapport with his audience. Romantic Italian Songs was cut in the United Kingdom under conductor Wally Stott. With RCA Victor ready for a promotion campaign, and Franchi already getting critical apraisal, the album was soon released. It contained a total of 12 tracks, with them being split evenly into six on side one, and six on side two. The album was made up entirely of Italian melodies, and Franchi is credited as the writer of "La vilanella" as well.

== Critical reception ==
Professional ratings
Review scores
Source	Rating
AllMusic	3/5 stars
Billboard	Positive (Spotlight)

Romantic Italian Songs was given a positive critical response following its release, and Franchi was noted for his vocals. Billboard magazine stated that the "Romantic Italian tenor Sergio Franchi bursts upon the American musical scene with stirring, big-voiced readings of familiar Italian melodies, both folk and operatic." The magazine noted that "He has a voice that sells songs with warmth and excitement that will make him a big favorite... Lovely orchestral backings add much to the album." It was given a three-star rating by AllMusic as well.

== Release and chart performance ==
Romantic Italian Songs was released by RCA on their Red Seal label in September 1962 as Franchi's debut album. The album was offered as a vinyl LP. A single of two English songs was released alongside the album. The label had begun a heavy promotional campaign to launch his American career, concurrent with the release of his album, and it was a major success.

It debuted on Billboard magazine's Top LP's chart in the issue dated November 24, 1962, peaking at No. 17 during an eighteen-week run on the chart. The album debuted on Cashbox magazine's Top 100 Albums chart in the issue dated November 24, 1962, being ranked lower at No. 37 during a six-week run on the Monaural chart. Romantic Italian Songs was also a success in the Classical music markets. He would continue recording albums for RCA, with several reaching the charts, although none would spawn a charting single.

In 1998, the album was released on compact disc format for the first time, and returned sales momentum made the album reach No. 167 nationwide for one week in the fall of 1998.

== Track listing ==
Side one
No.	Title	Writer(s)	Length
1.	"Core 'ngrato"	Salvatore Cardillo; Riccardo Cordiferro	3:11
2.	"Funiculì, Funiculà"	Luigi Denza; Peppino Turco	2:39
3.	"'O sole mio"	Eduardo di Capua; Giovanni Capurro	3:45
4.	"Mattinata"	Ruggero Leoncavallo	2:24
5.	"Mamma mia, che vo' sapé"	Emanuele Nutile, Salvatore Russo	3:29
6.	"La vilanella" (Adapted by Luboff)	Sergio Franchi	2:33

Side two
No.	Title	Writer(s)	Length
7.	"Marechiare"	Francesco Paolo Tosti; Salvatore Di Giacomo	3:01
8.	"'A vucchella"	Francesco Paolo Tosti; Gabriele D'Annunzio	2:34
9.	"Comme facette mammeta?"	Giuseppe Capaldo; Salvatore Gambardella	2:07
10.	"Fenesta che lucive"	Traditional, Guillaume Louis Cottrau	3:36
11.	"Torna a Surriento"	Ernesto De Curtis; Giambattista De Curtis	2:57
12.	"O surdato 'nnammurato"	Aniello Califano; Enrico Cannio	2:25
Total length:			34:41

== Chart performance ==
Chart performance for Romantic Italian Songs
Chart (1962–1963)	Peak position
US Billboard Top LPs	17
US Best-Selling Classical Albums	4
US Cashbox Top 100 Albums (Monaural)	37
Chart (1998)	Peak position
US The Billboard 200	167

== Release history ==
Release history and formats for Romantic Italian Songs
Region	Date	Format	Label	Ref.
United States and Canada	September 1962	Vinyl (LP)	RCA Victor Red Seal	
United States	1998	Compact Disc	RCA Victor Records	

== Personnel ==
All credits are adapted from the liner notes of Romantic Italian Songs.

- Sergio Franchi – lead vocals
- Wally Stott – arranger, conductor
- Sean Walker – liner notes
