= Sergio Franchi discography =

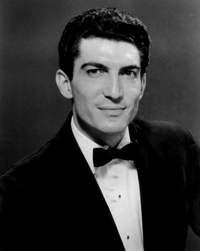
- RCA Victor Recording Artist
- Studio albums: 33
- Extended plays: 4
- Soundtrack albums: 1
- Live albums: 2
- Compilation albums: 9
- Singles: 26
- Original cast recordings: 1
- Collaborations: 3
- Music DVDs: 1

The discography of Sergio Franchi, the Italian-American tenor (1926–1990), consists of a total of thirty-five albums: Two live albums, and thirty-three studio albums (USA and Italy). The studio albums are further identified as collaborations (soundtracks, opera, & original cast), and nine are compilation albums (USA and Italy). The Live category included an LP album (1965) and a CD album (released posthumously) of selected songs extracted from Franchi's twenty-four Live TV appearances on The Ed Sullivan Show. This discography also includes thirty (one single recorded on two labels) single and EP albums recorded or released in various venues.

Sergio Franchi's American debut album, Romantic Italian Songs, was released on October 6, 1962, and had reached a peak position of seventeen on the Billboard 200 albums chart by the end of the year. The following year three of his albums hit the charts, while Romantic Italian Songs continued at number thirty-three. Our Man From Italy peaked at number sixty-six, and Broadway—I Love You! peaked at number one hundred and three on the Billboard 200. Also in 1963, Franchi recorded an album of duets with the Metropolitan Opera star, Anna Moffo: The Dream Duet peaked at position number ninety-seven on the Billboard 200. In 1965 Sergio Franchi once again had multiple albums on the Billboard 200. Live At The Coconut Grove peaked at number one hundred fourteen early in the year (recorded late in 1964, but released in 1965). His Christmas album, The Heart of Christmas (Cour' Di Natale) was his second best performance peaking at number twenty five. It charted again at number one hundred eight in 1967. Eight years after his 1990 death, (and thirty-six years after its first release) Sergio Franchi's American debut album, Romantic Italian Songs, (re-released as a CD in 11-97) reached a peak position on the Billboard 200 at number one hundred sixty-seven in 1998. Many of his studio albums (and several of his singles) were selected for Special Merit and Spotlight awards by Billboard magazine (see Notes below).

Sergio Franchi's Christmas album contained two very notable original songs: "Buon Natale (Christmas in Rome)" written for him by his first musical director, Neil Warner; and the title song "The Heart of Christmas (Cuor' Di Natale)" written by Anthony Velona. Since his death, RCA has released these two (and other Franchi Christmas songs) on dozens of collaboration albums not listed here.

== Studio albums (LP) ==
Four of these original LP albums have been re-mastered and reissued on CDs. [See CD section below]

Year	Album Name	Album Details	US Peak positions	Conductor	Recording Venue
1962	Romantic Italian Songs ^{Note 1}	RCA Victor Red Seal LSC-2640	17	Wally Stott Conductor	Recorded in England
1963	Our Man From Italy ^{Note 2}	RCA Victor Red Seal LSC-2657	66	Henri Rene Conductor	Not stated
1963	Broadway—I Love You! ^{Note 3}	RCA Victor Red Seal LSC-2674	103	Glenn Osser Conductor	Not stated
1963	The Dream Duet (Sergio Franchi and Anna Moffo) ^{Note 4}	RCA Victor Red Seal LSC-2675	97	Henri Rene Conductor	Not stated
1964	Women In My Life	RCA Victor Red Seal LSC-2696	–	Wally Stott Conductor	Recorded in England
1964	The Exciting Voice of Sergio Franchi ^{Note 5}	RCA Victor LSP-2943	–	Stan Applebaum Conductor	Webster Hall
1965	The Songs of Richard Rodgers ^{Note 6}	RCA Victor LSP-3365	–	Marty Manning Conductor	Webster Hall
1965	The Heart of Christmas (Cuor' Di Natale) ^{Note 7}	RCA Victor LSP-3437	25	Marty Gold Conductor	Webster Hall
1966	La Dolce Italy ^{Note 8}	RCA Victor LSP-3500	–	Frank Hunter Conductor	RCA Music Center of World, CA
1967	From Sergio - With Love	RCA Victor LSP-3654	–	Marty Gold Conductor	Webster Hall
1967	There Goes My Heart ^{Note 9}	RCA Victor LSP-3810	–	Marty Gold Conductor	Webster Hall
1968	I'm A Fool To Want You ^{Note 10}	RCA Victor LSP-3933	–	Sandy Block, Band Leader	RCA Victor Studio A, NYC
1968	Wine And Song	RCA Victor LSP-4018	–	Eric Knight Conductor	RCA Studio A, NYC ^{Note 11}
1970	Within Me	United Artists UAS 6727	–	Arrangement Credits Only	Not Stated
1972	Sergio Franchi	Metromedia MD 1047	–	Mike Berniker, Producer	Allegro Sound Studios
1976	TeleHouse Presents - Sergio Franchi	TeleHouse CD 2045	–	Wayne J. Kirby, Producer	Not stated
1976	20 Magnificent Songs	DynaHouse CD 2029 (Australia)	–	Wayne J. Kirby, Producer	Not stated
1976	Con Amore Sergio ^{Note 12}	Gold Records GR 1001	–	Arrangement Credits Only	Not stated
1989	Encore! ^{Note 13}	I.F. Productions YP100189	–	Sergio Franchi & Jon Russell, Producers	Not stated
"—" denotes releases that did not chart

- US Peak Positions for Albums as listed on Billboard 200

=== Notes ===
1. Billboard International Spotlight Album 1962 While Franchi's debut album peaked at #17 on Billboard's Pop charts before the end of 1962, it remained on Billboard's Pop charts for eight weeks. It still ranked #33 on January 19, 1963. As a Classical Red Seal recording, a February 16, 1963 Billboard Survey of Best Selling Classical Records revealed that Franchi's album was #4 in Classical Album Sales..after Horowitz, Tchaikovsky, & Bartok albums. When re-issued as a CD late in 1997, the album peaked again at #167 on the Pop Charts (September 5, 1998). Eleven editions were published between 1962-1998. Album was issued in UK as RCA SF-7527. It was Issued in Italy as Un Nuovo Grande Tenore, Sergio Franchi, RCA Italiana LPM-10124. Another 1962 issue in Japan (RA-2146). Issued in Argentina (1962) as Canciones Romanticas de Italia. Issued in Canada as LSC-2640. Issued in Germany as LSC-2932: Issued in New Zealand as RPL-2932: Issued in France as Chansons Romantiques Italiennes, RCA Red Seal 450.556-5. Reissues in 1997 and 1998 account for eleven editions.
2. Billboard Special Merit Pick 1963 Franchi's second album peaked at #66 on February 9, 1963, and was ten weeks on the Pop charts as of April 13, 1963. Including the US issue, RCA issued eight editions of this album. Issued in UK as RCA RD-7556; issued in Canada as LSC-2657; issued in Japan (RA-2163); issued in Argentina as Muestro Hombre De Italia; Issued in Australia (RCA Red Seal L1632): Issued in Brazil as LM-2657: Issued in France as Chante L'Italie. As a result of Franchi's record sales and popularity, Billboard announced that Seeburg's Little LP Library was now using 7-inch LPs of his recordings for Jukebox programming. This was historically important 50 years ago. Before the advent of boom-boxes, Walk-a-Man's, and MP3 players, (and before the decline of jukeboxes in the 1970s;) Jukeboxes were as important as car radios for listening to popular music away from home. See, eg.
3. Billboard Spotlight Album 1963 Billboard Breakout Album 1963 This RCA Victor Red Seal album had spent nineteen weeks on Billboard's "150 Best Sellers" chart and ranked #120 as of June 15, 1963. A month later it peaked on the Pop Charts at #103. Also issued in Canada. RCA announced that this Dynagrove recording would now be available for International distribution in 36 countries in the fall of 1963. RCA featured Sergio Franchi's vocal artistry to entertain their international affiliates and distributors at their 11th annual best buys sales meet that year.
4. Billboard Pop Spotlight Album 1963 Billboard Breakout Album 1963 This Red Seal album peaked on the Pop charts at #97 on December 28, 1963. The popularity of these two artists singing together was a factor in the Metropolitan Opera selecting Sergio Franchi for the featured tenor role of Alfred in a recording of their popular English production of Die Fledermaus.
5. Billboard Pop Spotlight Album 1964 This album marked Sergio Franchi's move from RCA Victor's Red Seal Label to Black label in active pursuit of the Pop market. Also issued in Germany as LSP-2943.
6. Billboard Spotlight Album 1965 While starring in his Broadway musical, Sergio pays tribute to Richard Rodgers. Also issued in Canada as LSP-3365. Reissued in 1977 with catalog number ANL1-2463 in RCA's budget priced "Pure Gold" series.
7. Billboard Christmas Spotlight Album 1965 Peaked at #25 in 1965. Charted again on Billboard 200 at #108 in 1967.
8. Billboard Pop Special Merit Album 1966 La Dolce Italy contains some memorable Neapolitan selections. Also issued in Canada as LSP-3500.
9. Billboard Pop Special Merit Album 1967 As per the liner notes, "Sergio Franchi Spins Magic with Romantic Melodies of Love."
10. Released February 10, 1968. Album also issued in Canada as LSP-3933.
11. Per liner notes, "RCA Studio B, NYC," although this venue is in Nashville, and thought to be an error.
12. Full title was Con Amore Sergio - From My Private Collection.
13. Sergio Franchi's last album contains six songs never before recorded by him, including the winning song from the 1988 Sanremo Festival.

== Live albums ==
This section contains two live albums: Sergio Franchi's 1965 Live recording (LP), and a 2008 CD issued posthumously by Sofa Entertainment from the archives of The Ed Sullivan Show.

Year	Album Name	Album Details	US Peak positions	Conductor	Recording Venue
1965	Sergio Franchi Live! At The Coconut Grove ^{Note 1}	RCA Victor 3310	114	Freddie Martin Orchestra, Neil Warner Directing	Ambassador Hotel (Los Angeles)
2008	Sergio Franchi on The Ed Sullivan Show ^{Note 2}	Sofa Entertainment, Inc.	–	Ray Bloch Conductor	CBS Studios (New York City)
"—" denotes releases that did not chart

- US Peak Positions for Albums as listed on Billboard 200

=== Notes ===
1. Billboard Pop Spotlight Album 1965. Billboard's Spotlight review States that Franchi's Live album captures "the electricity that radiates from this performer." Recorded October 25, 1964; Released January 30, 1965. Billboard Breakout Album 1965 Peaked at #114 on April 17, 1965.
2. Some different tracks than DVD.

== Collaboration albums (LP) ==
Since Sergio Franchi's death in 1990, RCA has released several of his Christmas songs on dozens of collaboration albums. Several of these collaboration albums are incorrectly listed by Allrovi.com as primary studio albums.

This collaboration album named Buon Natale - Christmas in Italy was released by Four Corners (FCL 4223), and contained four songs (Christmas carols) recorded by Sergio Franchi in Italy. The other album carols are by un-related artists. These same four Sergio Franchi Christmas carols were also contained on the 1965 Durium compilation, Buon Natale which contained twelve Franchi songs.

The 1965 Original Cast Recording of Do I Hear a Waltz? was reissued in 1992 as CD on Sony #SK48206. The 1963 recording of The Great Moments From Die Fledermaus was re-mastered and re-issued in 1999 as CD on BMG #0902663468-2.

Year	Album Name	Album Details	Conductor	Recording Venue
1960	San Remo 1960 ^{Note 1}	Durium MSA 77027	Federico Bergamini (Franchi tracks)	Durium in Italy
1965	Buon Natale - Christmas in Italy	Four Corners FCL 4223	Franco Cassano (Franchi's tracks)	Durium in Italy
1964	The Great Moments from Die Fledermaus ^{Note 2}	RCA Victor Red Seal 2728	Oskar Danon	Recorded in Vienna 1963
1965	Do I Hear a Waltz? ^{Note 3} ^{Note 4}	Columbia Masterworks KOL 6370	Frederick Dvench, Musical Director	CBS 30th St Studio, NYC
1969	The Secret of Santa Vittoria ^{Note 5} ^{Note 6}	United Artists UAS 5200	Ernest Gold	Not Stated

=== Notes ===
1. This album of seventeen songs contains the same four Franchi recordings as the EP album of the same name. Also issued in Yugoslavia under Yugoton label LPD-V-170.
2. The Great Moments From Die Fledermaus is a Johann Strauss, Jr. operetta sung in English with Anna Moffo, Sergio Franchi, Rise Stevens, etc. The album's re-issue on compact disc is both a "surprise" ('great sound, but too short') and testament to the album's notability. Raymond Tuttle's review states that "Among the tenors, Sergio Franchi's tongue-in-cheek Alfred leaves the most lingering impression."
3. Billboard Original Cast Spotlight Album 1965 The album featuring Sergio Franchi and Elizabeth Allen was recorded by Columbia Records, courtesy of RCA Victor. Although there was some controversy over the book, and problems between the executive principals...the Rodgers/Sondheim score, and the principal cast (Elizabeth Allen & Sergio Franchi) were usually always given high marks. See, eg. When it was re-mastered as a CD, a KeelanMusic review again gives a very favorable review to this Original Cast recording. A Client Review (4.1 out of 5 Stars) on Amazon.com calls it "one of the best original cast albums I've ever heard."
4. The film soundtrack contains two songs performed by Sergio Franchi: "The Song of Santa Vittoria (Stay)" in English and nominated for Best Original Song at 1969 Golden Globe Awards. The album also contains a version of this same song with Italian lyrics written by Sergio Franchi.
5. This soundtrack was reissued as a split release CD album with Ernest Gold's soundtrack of "On The Beach." This has resulted in some of Franchi's credits on "Santa Vittoria" being confused with credits from "On The Beach"...a movie made ten years before Franchi came to this country.

== Compilation albums, USA (LP) ==
These compilation LP albums were primary reissues of previously recorded tracks. All of the songs/tracks are by Sergio Franchi. The album, This is Sergio Franchi continues to be incorrectly listed by Allrovi.com as a studio album. Franchi recorded his last studio album for RCA Victor in 1968. This popular 1973 compilation was re-mastered and re-issued as a CD in 1988 as BMG #886972403328.

Year	Album Title	Album Number	Recording Details
1973	This is Sergio Franchi ^{Note 1}	RCA VPS-6082	Digitally remastered by RCA in 1988 as CD ^{Note 2}
1975	The Best of Sergio Franchi	RCA ANL1-1070	Issued in RCA's budget priced "Pure Gold" Series
1976	Sergio Franchi Sings Volare	RCA DLP-10186	Chrysler Corporation Promo Album
1977	Sergio Franchi / Volare ^{Note 3}	RCA APL1-2132	RCA's 15th Anniversary (Recording Contract) Tribute to Sergio
1998	The Beautiful Music Company Presents Sergio Franchi	RCA/BMG Special Products DMC 12137	New Compilation Issued as CD

=== Notes ===
1. This compilation was issued as a two-record LP album, and contained 20 songs.
2. The 1988 re-issue of the popular 1973 compilation as a CD contained only 14 songs.
3. Billboard Recommended Easy Listening LPs list. Album issued in Canada as CPL1-1232. Album also issued in Turkey as APL1-1232

== Compilation albums, Durium (LP) ==
Three LP albums of Sergio Franchi's Italian recordings published in America are simply labeled as being recorded by Durium Records (active from 1935–1985) in Italy. These Italian recordings were released on three USA albums early in his career in America. No recording dates or original Italian album names were listed on the albums, but have been dated; production and musical credits are missing. These studio album recordings consist of 25 songs recorded in the Italian language. The 1965 compilation, Buon Natale, contains the four Franchi Durium Christmas recordings, and repeats eight other Durium recordings contained within the other three compilation albums. [As an important historical footnote, it should be disclosed that Durium, its parent company RCA Italiana, and RCA Victor were all acquired by BMG. Technically, BMG owns most (if not all) of Franchi's recordings produced before 1970. One exception would be any recordings produced in South Africa.]

Year	Album Title	Album Number	Recording Details
1963	The Golden Voice of Italy	London International TW 91291	Durium in Italy
1965	Sergio Franchi Sings In Italian - Il Fantastico!	Four Corners Records FCL 4228	Durium in Italy
1965	La Bella Italia	Four Corners Records FCL 4221	Durium in Italy
1965	Buon Natale	Durium DRL 50012	Released in UK by PYE Records Ltd.

== Singles and EP albums ==
Promoted by RCA Victor as an album artist, Sergio Franchi never had an actual "hit single" on his American recordings. Many of his single and EP recordings were hits in the sense that they were singles from his hit Billboard 200 albums.

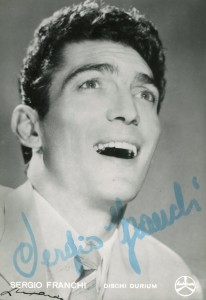
Sergio Franchi Disco Durium 1960

=== Durium label 45rpm (Italy, UK, Canada) ===
Year	Song Title	Recording Details
1959	"Amore mio"	Durium 16647 (UK)
1960	"Our Concerto (Il nostro concerto)"	Durium 16653 (UK)
1960	"Il nostro concerto"; "Grigio di Londra"	Durium 6874
1960	Sergio Franchi (EP) ^{Note 1}: "I tuoi occhi verdi"; "Amore mio"; "Le nacchere"; "Lassu' nel cielo"	Durium EPA 3212
1960	San Remo 1960 (EP): "Perderti"; "Splende L'arcobaleno"; "Perdoniamoci"; "Splende il sole"	Durium ECGE 75144 ^{Note 2}
1960	Sergio Franchi Sings (EP): "Our Concerto (Il Nostro Concerto)"; "Good Old London Town (Grigio Di Londra)"; "Amore mio"; "I tuoi occhi verde"	Durium U 20071 (UK)
1961	"Se due squarde s'incontrano" ^{Note 3}; "Sapro' che sei tu"	Durium LDA 7013
n.d.	"Tu scendi dalle stelle"	Durium DC 26098 (Canada)^{Note 4}
n.d.	"Santa notte (Holy Night)"; "Bianco natale"	Durium DC 26099 (Canada)

=== American labels 45rpm ===
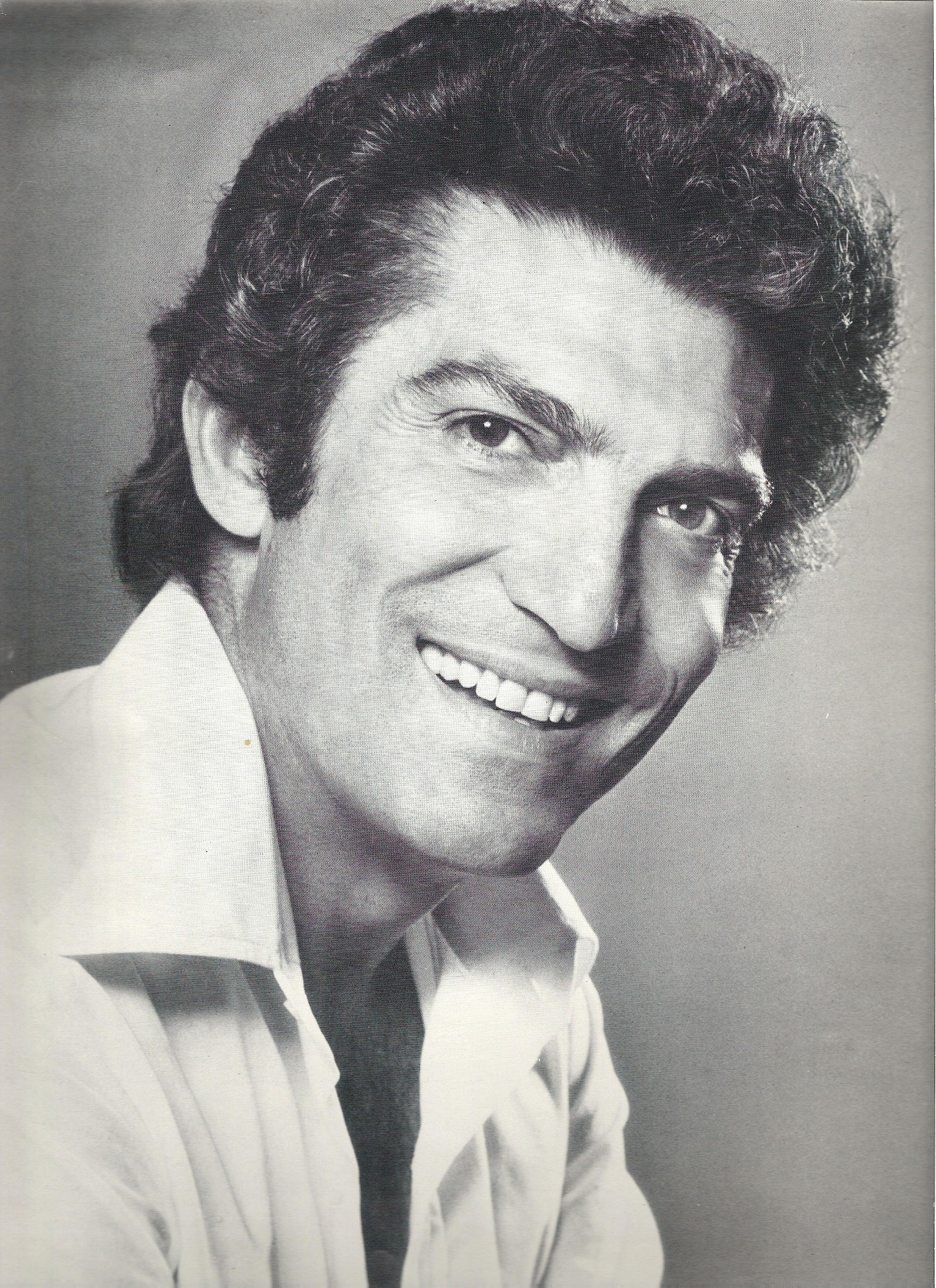
Sergio Franchi, 1974 photo

Year	Song Title	Recording Details
1962	"Appasionada"; "Midnight in Paris"	RCA 1289 (UK)^{Note 5}
1962	Romantic Italian Songs (EP): "'O sole mio"; "Torna a Surriento"; "Core 'ngrato"; "Marechiare"	Victor of Japan SCP 3520
1963	Our Man From Italy (EP): "Luna rossa"; "Mamma"; "Dicitencello vuie"; "Santa Lucia"	German RCA EPA 9080
1963	Our Man From Italy (EP): "Luna rossa"; "Mamma"; "Dicitencello vuie"; "Santa Lucia"	Victor of Japan SHP 2220
1963	"Once"; "I Mustn't Say I Love Her"	RCA 47-8103
1963	"The Good Life" ^{Note 6}; "Bella Nina"	RCA 47-8149
1964	"Chicago" (in Italian); "Cuando calienta el sol" ^{Note 7}	RCA 47-8315
1964	"No Arms Can Ever Hold You"; "The Seventh Dawn"	RCA 47-8409
1965	"Someone Like You"; "Take the Moment"	RCA 47-8552
1965	"Moon Over Naples"; "Ciao, Ciao (So Long for Now)"	RCA 47-8686
1967	"I Should Care"; "There Goes My Heart"	RCA 1603 (UK)
1967	"What Will Tomorrow Bring" ^{Note 8}; "Maybe It's Time for Me"	RCA 47-9124
1967	"I Should Care" ^{Note 9}; "No One Else (Lui No)"	RCA 47-9277
1968	"Time alone Will Tell (Non Pensare a Me)"; "I'm a Fool To Want You"	RCA 47-9471
1968	"The Song of Santa Vittoria (Stay)" (English); "The Song of Santa Vittoria (Stay)" (Italian)	UA 91350 (France) ^{Note 10}
1968	"The Song of Santa Vittoria (Stay)" (English); "The Song of Santa Vittoria (Stay)" (Italian)	UA 1696 (Japan)
1969	"Hold Me (I Need Your Arms Around Me)"; "Why or Where or When"	UA 50612
1970	"Granada"; "Within Me (Stanotte sentirai una cazone)"	UA 50630
1970	"Buona Fortuna, Adio Bambina"; "More Than Strangers (Vorrei che fosse amore)"	UA 50664
1970	"Love Is All"; "Here We Go Round Again"	UA 50681
1971	"No Man Is an Island"; "I Search the World for Love"	Metro 219
1972	"If (Bread song)" ^{Note 11} ^{Note 12}; "Somehow"	Metro 238
1972	"Philadelphia, With Love" (Vocal); Instrumental version	SG 1208 (Rooster Emblem) ^{Note 13}
1979	"More (Theme from Mondo Cane)"; "Laugh You Silly Clown" ^{Note 14}	L.A. International L33-1856
1980	"More (Theme from Mondo Cane)"; "Laugh You Silly Clown" ^{Note 14}	Bulldog BD 19

=== Notes ===
1. Franchi's first Durium recordings.
2. Also issued as EPA 3207
3. (If Two Glances Meet) Sergio Franchi credited with the lyrics.
4. This single is from Durium collaboration album Santa Notte KL 117 per label information.
5. Sergio Franchi's RCA audition selections, Wally Stott conductor.
6. Billboard Special Merit Spotlight for new single release. Recorded before February 3, 1963 (per Billboard issue of that date.
7. Billboard Four Star Single.
8. Billboard Chart Spotlight.
9. Billboard Chart Spotlight.
10. Rare Franchi single with picture sleeve, issued in France.
11. This song is parenthetically subtitled (the 'Bread' song) (Composer David Gates of "Bread") as a disambiguation note vs. the song of the same title composed by R. Hargreaves, S. Damerell, & T. Evans.
12. Billboard Special Merit Spotlight for new single release.
13. SG was Sergio Franchi's label- with Rooster emblem. Birth name was Sergio Galli (SG), and "Galli" means "rooster" in Italian. Franchi collected roosters.
14. Vesti la giubba with Disco background. Experimental. Arrangement by Benjamin F. Wright, Jr. Released by several labels.

== Filmography (DVD) ==
- Performing before the advent of the internet, and before MTV made music videos a standard product for singers; the filmography of Sergio Franchi is notable for its poverty of published content: Only two DVD's have been made available to the general public. The most readily available is a Sofa Entertainment, Inc DVD collection of 13 songs and a comedy skit excerpted from Franchi's twenty-four appearances on The Ed Sullivan Show between 1962 and 1971. Sergio Franchi on the Ed Sullivan Show was issued posthumously.
- The only other known DVD came from Europe, and is not currently available. Shortly after Franchi emigrated to the United States, he completed a contract with German producers to appear on a music show filmed in Vienna. He subsequently appeared with Italian singer, Audrey Arno, and Israeli-born Carmela Corren (among others) in Sing, aber spiel nicht mit mir (1963, Kurt Nachmann producer).

== List of CDs released posthumously ==
- 1988 This Is Sergio Franchi. RCA #886972403328. (Released before his 1990 death) Re-master and re-issue of 1973 compilation album. (Note: This re-master contains 14 songs. Original 1973 RCA Victor compilation LP was two-record LP containing 20 songs.)
- 1992 Do I Hear a Waltz? Original Cast Recording. Sony #SK48206. Re-master & re-issue of 1965 LP.
- 1997 Romantic Italian Songs. RCA #09026-68902-24. Re-master & re-issue of 1962 LP debut album. (Note: Peaked at number 167 on Billboard 200 in 1998, thirty-six years after original release (which peaked number seventeen in 1962).)
- 1998 Romantic Italian Songs. Also re-issued by The Musical Heritage Society #514996W.
- 1998 The Beautiful Music Company Presents Sergio Franchi. RCA/BMG Special Products DMC 12137. New compilation from RCA LPs.
- 1999 The Great Moments From Die Fledermaus. RCA #09026-63468-2. Re-master and re-issue of 1964 RCA Victor collaboration LP.
- 1999 The Heart of Christmas (Cuor' di Natale). RCA/BMG #09026-63515-27. Re-issue and re-master of 1965 LP.
- ???? The Heart of Christmas (Cuor' di Natale). Also re-issued by The Musical Heritage Society.
- 2006 The Exciting Voice of Sergio Franchi. RCA # 09043-124531-21. Re-master and re-issue of 1964 LP. (Note: Issued as a 2-CD Box-Set by RCA/BMG Special Products.)
- 2006 Sergio Franchi Live! at The Coconut Grove. RCA # 09043-124531-21. Re-master and reissue of 1965 LP.
- 2008 Sergio Franchi on the Ed Sullivan Show. Audio CD of Sullivan appearances by same name as DVD. Sofa Entertainment, Inc.

== See also ==
- List of songs recorded by Sergio Franchi
- List of Operatic pop artists
