= List of songs recorded by Sergio Franchi =

This is a comprehensive list of the songs recorded by Sergio Franchi. It begins with the songs he recorded on the Durium label in Italy and in the UK (1959-1961), and continues with the songs he recorded in the United States beginning in 1962.

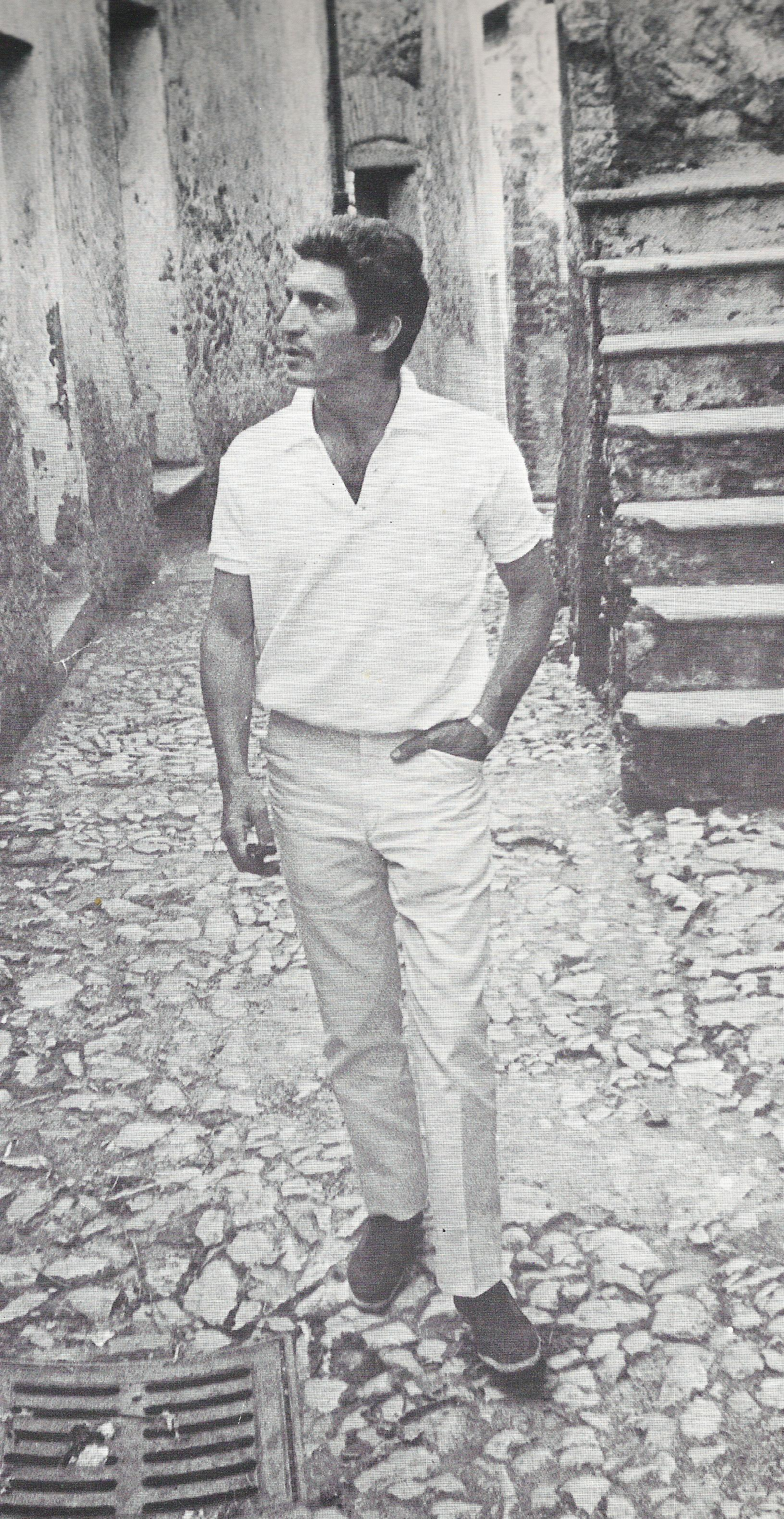
Sergio Franchi in Italy during filming of The Secret of Santa Vittoria, 1968

== Songs recorded at Durium Studios, Italy & UK ==
Most of these thirty-one (1959-1961) songs were recorded in the Italian language: the exception is the third song, which was recorded in both Italian and English/Italian versions. "Il nostro concerto" and "Amore Mio" were both originally recorded by Franchi in Italian, but English/Italian versions were recorded by him on the Durium (UK) label. Franchi's recordings of "Amore Mio" and "I tuoi occhi verde" were hit singles in Italy. The songs in this section were primarily recordings for the popular Italian market (includes four Christmas carols) during Franchi's return to Italy from South Africa; it includes selections from the Sanremo Music Festival during 1960 and 1961. Songs titles include likely English translations.

- "Amore mio" (My Love) (Hit record for Franchi in Italy)
- "Falsamoneta" (False Money..Counterfeit)
- "Good Old London Town (Grigio di Londra)" (from Dal film Il mondo di notte)
- "Grand'mere"
- "Gringo"
- "I' tuoi occhi verde" (Your Green Eyes) (Hit record for Franchi in Italy)
- "In fondo all' anima" (The depth of soul)
- "Il nostro concerto" (Our Concert) List of number-one hits of 1960 (Italy)
- "La montagna" (The Mountain)
- "Le nacchere" (The Castanets)
- "Lassu nel cielo" (Up there in the sky)
- "Lei" (Senterei; Pazzaglia authors) Italian song placed 12th Sanremo Music Festival 1961
- "Non cercatemi" (Do not look for me)
- "Non ho mai amato" (I never loved)
- "Non so dimenticare" (I cannot forget)
- "Perderti" (Miss). From Sanremo Music Festival in 1960
- "Perdoniamoci" (Let us forgive). From Sanremo Music Festival in 1960
- "Pero' la bocca" (However the mouth?)
- "Piu' nulla" (More than anything)
- "Princepessa d'un di" (Princess of a time)
- "Sapro' che sei tu (I will know it is you)"
- "Se due squarde s'incontrano" (If two glances meet). Franchi credited with lyrics.
- "Smarrimento" (Loss of Self)
- "Splende il sole" (The sun is shining). From Sanremo Music Festival in 1960
- "Splende l'arcobaleno" (Shines the rainbow). From Sanremo Music Festival in 1960
- "Sulla sabbia" (On the sand)
- "Uscita da un quadro (Di Modligiani)" (Output from a painting by Modigliani)

Christmas carols:

- "Tu scendi dalle stelle" (Traditional Italian Christmas carol)
- "Fra l'orrido rigor" (Traditional Italian Christmas carol)
- "Bianco Natale (White Christmas)"
- "Santa notte ((Silent) Holy Night)"

== Songs recorded on American albums ==
Regarding his repertoire, Sergio Franchi stated that he had a "four-pronged approach", but that included some of his operatic arias which were very popular as encores with his concert audiences. A true operatic crossover artist (with its genre-busting complexities), Franchi recorded two studio albums devoted to opera (The Dream Duet and The Great Moments From Die Fledermaus, both with Anna Moffo). He also recorded three other operatic arias: two solo arias ("E lucevan le stelle," "Vesti la giubba" and "My heart at Thy Sweet Voice" dueting with Julie Andrews).. although he thought he performed many more. Songs from opera, operettas, and many of the classic Neapolitan songs are usually classified by genre as Opera. For the purposes of this list of songs, Sergio Franchi's recordings will be placed into the four categories that he used in organizing his repertoire.

=== Neapolitan and Italian songs ===
The following seventy-five songs were originally written by Italian composers and lyricists. Franchi's dedication to the genre is evidenced by the fact that almost all of his studio albums contain one or more Neapolitan and/or Italian songs. Three of his studio albums (Romantic Italian Songs, Our Man from Italy, & La Dolce Italy) contained all Italian selections.

- "Al di la" (Beyond) Winning song Sanremo Music Festival 1961
- "A Man Without Love" (Quando M'innamoro) From Sanremo Music Festival 1968
- "Ammore mio"
- "Anema e Core" (How Wonderful to Know)
- "Arrivederci Roma" (from the film of the same name, released as Seven Hills of Rome in Europe)
- "A vucchela ("Arieta di posilippo")"
- "Ay, ay Maria" (Franchi accompanies self on Flamenco guitar)
- "Buona sera"
- "(Dearest) Cara"
- "Caruso"
- "Chiove" (And it Rains)
- "Chitarra Romana" (Roman Guitars)
- "Comme facette mammeta?"
- "Core 'ngrato" (Ungrateful Heart)
- "Di nome si cimava vena ronda"
- "Dicitencello vuie" (You Should Tell Her) Several versions recorded
- "E lucevan le stelle" (aria from Puccini's opera Tosca)
- "Fenesta che lucive"
- "Fili d'oro" (Golden Threads)
- "Funiculi, Funicula"
- "(Give Him That) Pizza-zza"
- "I Have But One Heart" "(O Marenariello)" *(Neapolitan song in English featured in film The Godfather)
- "I Wrote A Song For You" ("Canzone per te") Winning song Sanremo Music Festival 1968
- "I'te vurria vasa!" (I Want to Kiss You!)
- "If You Should Leave Me" ("E se domani"). From Sanremo Music Festival 1964
- "Il primo amore" (My First Love)
- "Just Say I Love Her" ("Dicitencello vuie")
- "La strade nel bosco" (A Road in The Woods)
- "La vilanella" (Traditional Italian folk song with Sergio Franchi/Norman Luboff adaptation)
- "Laugh You Silly Clown" (Disco/Experimental rock version of "Vesti la giubba")
- "Luna rossa" (Blushing Moon)
- "Malafemmena" (A standard in Sergio Franchi's repertoire)
- "Mama" ("Mamma") (Franchi recorded several versions)
- "Mamma mia, che vo' sape'"
- "Marechiare"
- "Mattinata" ("L'auora di bianco vestita")
- "More Than Strangers" ("Vorrei che fosse amore")
- "Musica proibita" (Forbidden Music)
- "My Heart Reminds Me" ("And That Reminds Me")(based on Italian instrumental "Autumn Concerto.")
- "Na voce, 'na chitarra e ' poco 'e luna" (In Italian & English)
- "Never Never Never" ("Grande, grande, grande")
- "Non dimenticar" Franchi accompanies self on guitar
- "Non ti scordar di me" (Do Not Forget Me)
- "No One Else (Lui no)"
- "Oh Marie" (Maria Mari')
- "'O sole mio"
- "O Surdato 'Nnamurato" (Soldier in Love)
- "Oh, How Much I Love You" ("Dio, come ti amo") Winning song Sanremo Music Festival 1966
- "Our Concerto" ("Il nostro concerto")" Also recorded on Durium.
- "Parlami d'amore" (Speak to me of Love)
- "Passione"
- "Perdere l'amore" (Losing the Love) Winning song Sanremo Music Festival 1988
- "Piove (Ciao, ciao bambina)" Winning song Sanremo Music Festival 1959
- "Piscatore'e Pusilleco" (Fishermen of Pusilleco)
- "Quando, quando, quando" (When, When, When) From the 1962 San Remo Music Festival
- "Santa Lucia"
- "Santa Lucia Luntana"
- "Serenade in The Night" ("Violino tzigano") English lyrics
- "Sicilian Wagonners"
- "Souvenir d'Italie" (Memories of Italy)
- "Speak Softly Love" *(Love Theme from 1972 film The Godfather) (aka "Parla piu piano")
- "Statte vicino a'mme" (Stay Close To Me)
- "The Gypsies" (Les Gitans)
- "This Is My Life (La vita)" From Sanremo Music Festival 1968 (English lyrics N. Newell)
- "Time Alone Will Tell ("Non pensare a me") Winning song Sanremo Music Festival 1967
- "Torna" (Come Back)
- "Torna a Surriento"
- "Torna, piccina!" (Come Back, My Little Girl)
- "Until Tonight" ("Concerto d'amore")
- "Vesti la giubba" (Aria from Leoncavallo's opera Pagliacci)
- "Volare" ("Nel blu dipinto di blu") Winning song Sanremo Music Festival 1958
- "Vurria"
- "With You Beside Me" (Vogliamoci tanto bene)
- "Within Me" ("Stanotte sentirai una cazone") From the 1968 Sanremo Music Festival.

=== Songs from film and stage ===
This category contains eighty-three songs; but not the largest category when considering the one-hundred-six Italian and Neapolitan songs recorded by Franchi in both Italy and America. Five of his studio albums were dedicated to show tunes (Broadway - I Love You!, The Dream Duet with Anna Moffo, Original Cast Album of Do I Hear a Waltz?, the collaboration album Great Moments from Die Fledermaus, & The Songs of Richard Rodgers.)

- "Ah! Sweet Mystery of Life" (Duet w/Anna Moffo)
- "A Kiss in The Dark" (Duet w/Anna Moffo)
- "And This Is My Beloved"
- "As Long As She Needs Me"
- "Autumn in Rome"
- "A Woman in Love"
- "Bali Ha'i"
- "Bargaining"
- "C'est Magnifique"
- "Diane"
- "Falling in Love With Love"
- "Gigi"
- "Here We Are, Just You and I"
- "Hi-Lili, Hi-Lo"
- "I Didn't Know What Time It Was"
- "I Have Dreamed"
- "I Will Wait For You"
- "I'll See You Again" (Duet w/Anna Moffo)
- "I've Grown Accustomed to Her Face"
- "If Ever I Would Leave You"
- "If I Loved You"
- "If I Were a Rich Man"
- "If She Walked Into My Life"
- "Indian Love Call" (Duet w/Anna Moffo)
- "It Only Takes a Moment"
- "Jennie"
- "Laura"
- "Lover Come Back to Me" (Duet w/Anna Moffo)
- "Make Someone Happy"
- "Mama, A Rainbow"
- "Maria"
- "Maybe It's Time For Me"
- "Memory"
- "Mimi"
- "More (Theme from Mondo Cane)"
- "More Than a Miracle"
- "My Funny Valentine"
- "My heart at Thy Sweet Voice(w/Julie Andrews)
- "My Heart Stood Still"
- "My Hero" (Duet w/Anna Moffo)
- "My Romance"
- "On a Clear Day"
- "Once in Love With Amy"
- "One Alone" (Duet w/Anna Moffo)
- "People Will Say We're in Love"
- "Philadelphia, With Love"
- "Shalom"
- "She's My Love"
- "So In Love"
- "Some Day" (Duet w/Anna Moffo)
- "Somebody Somewhere"
- "Someone Like You"
- "Somewhere, My Love" ("Lara's theme")
- "Spring is Here"
- "Stay"
- "Stella By Starlight"
- "Strangers in the Night"
- "Sweethearts" (Duet w/Anna Moffo)
- "Take The Moment"
- "Tammy"
- "Thank You So Much" (Duet w/Elizabeth Allen)
- "The Good Life"
- "The Impossible Dream (The Quest)"
- "The 7th Dawn"
- "The Shadow of Your Smile"
- "The Song Is You"
- "The Song of Santa Vittoria (Stay)"
- "The Song of Santa Vittoria (Stay)" (In Italian)
- "The Sound of Music"
- "The Sweetest Sounds"
- "Thinking" (Duet w/Elizabeth Allen)
- "Three Coins in the Fountain"
- "This Nearly Was Mine"
- "Till There Was You"
- "To Life (La C'hiam)"
- "Tonight"
- "Too Many Mornings"
- "Traveling Down A Lonely Road"
- "What Kind of Fool Am I?"
- "(Where Do I Begin?) Love Story"
- "Who (Will Take My Place)" (Qui)
- "Will You Remember"(Duet w/Anna Moffo)
- "You Are Love" (Duet w/Anna Moffo)
- "You'll Never Walk Alone" (with Welsh Choir)
- "Yours Is My Heart Alone" (Duet w/Anna Moffo)
- (from Naughty Marietta)
- (from 1921 musical comedy Orange Blossoms)
- (from Kismet)
- (from Oliver!)
- (from 1953 film Indiscretion of An American Wife)
- (from 1955 film Guys and Dolls)
- (from South Pacific)
- (from 1965 musical Do I Hear a Waltz?)
- (from musical Can-Can)
- (from 1927 film Seventh Heaven)
- (1938 musical The Boys From Syracuse)
- (from the 1958 film Gigi)
- (English aria from opera Die Fledermaus)
- (1953 film is Lili)
- (from 1939 musical Too Many Girls)
- (from The King & I)
- (from the film The Umbrellas of Cherbourg)
- (1929 operetta Bitter Sweet)
- (1956 musical My Fair Lady)
- (1960 musical Camelot)
- (1945 musical Carousel)
- (1964 musical Fiddler on the Roof)
- (1966 musical Mame)
- (1924 musical Rose Marie)
- (1964 musical Hello, Dolly!)
- (from 1963 Broadway musical Jennie)
- (1945 film Laura)
- (1928 operetta The New Moon)
- (1960 musical Do Re Mi)
- (1970 musical Minnie's Boys)
- (1956 musical West Side Story)
- (1967 musical Sherry!)
- (1983 musical Cats)
- (1932 musical film Love Me Tonight)
- (1963 film)
- (title song 1967 film)
- (1937 musical Babes in Arms)
- (Samson and Delilah (opera))
- (1927 musical Connecticut Yankee)
- (English, 1908 operetta The Chocolate Soldier)
- (1935 musical Jumbo)
- (1965, On a Clear Day You Can See Forever)
- (Where's Charley?)
- (1926 musical The Desert Song)
- (1943 musical Oklahoma!)
- (tourism promotional film of same name)
- (1961 musical Milk and Honey)
- (1961 musical Carnival)
- (from 1948 musical Kiss Me Kate)
- (1925 operetta The Vagabond King)
- (1956 musical The Most Happy Fella)
- (1965 musical Do I Hear A Waltz?)
- (from the 1965 film Doctor Zhivago)
- (1938 musical I Married an Angel)
- (1965 musical Do I Hear A Waltz?)
- (The Uninvited, film from 1944)
- (Instrumental, 1966 film A Man Could Get Killed)
- (1913 musical Sweethearts)
- (1965 musical Do I Hear a Waltz?)
- (1957 film Tammy and the Bachelor)
- (1965 musical Do I Hear A Waltz?)
- (1962 film The Seven Capital Sins)
- (from 1965 musical Man of La Mancha)
- (1964 film title song)
- (1965 film The Sandpiper)
- (1963 TV production Music in The Air)
- (1969 film The Secret of Santa Vittoria) see Note
- (as above, Italian lyrics by Sergio Franchi)
- (1965 musical The Sound of Music)
- (1962 musical No Strings)
- (1965 musical Do I Hear a Waltz?)
- (title song for 1970 TV movie of the same name)
- (South Pacific)
- (1957 musical The Music Man)
- (Fiddler on the Roof, 1964 musical)
- (1958 musical West Side Story)
- (1971 musical Follies)
- (La Strada love theme, 1954)
- (1961 musical Stop the World, I Want to Get Off)
- (1970 film Love Story)
- (The World Of Charles Aznavour TV production)
- (1917 musical Maytime)
- (from Show Boat)
- (1945 musical Carousel)
- (1923 Land of Smiles)

Note: Nominated Golden Globe Award for Best Original Song

=== Popular and romantic ballads ===
This song list contains seventy-three songs recorded in a variety of styles (including Country/Western, American folk songs, and some International favorites). "Appasionada" and "Midnight in Paris" were recorded on a single in London with Wally Stott in 1962 and are believed to be two of the songs presented for Sergio Franchi's 1962 audition with RCA Victor.

- "And I Love You So"
- "Appasionada" (Luboff/Russell composition)
- "Autumn Leaves" ("Les Feuilles Mortes")
- "Bella Nina"
- "Blue Moon"
- "Buona Fortuna, Addio Bambina'
- "Chicago" (sung in Italian)
- "Cuando calienta el sol"
- "Ciao, Ciao (So Long For Now)" (Jose Melis song)
- "Don't Leave Me Now"
- "Ebb Tide"
- "Everybody Knows"
- "Granada" (in Spanish & English)
- "Help Me Make It Through the Night"
- "Here We Go 'Round Again"
- "Hold Me (I Need Your Arms Around Me)"
- "I Can't Get You Out of My Heart"
- "I Had the Craziest Dream"
- "I Left My Heart in San Francisco" (in Italian)
- "I Mustn't Say I Love Her"
- "I Never Fell in Love"
- "I Search the World for Love"
- "I Should Care"
- "I Wish You Love ("Que Reste T-il de Nos Amours?") (In French & English)
- "I'll Never Smile Again"
- "I'm a Fool to Want You"
- "If (Bread song)"
- "In The Still of the Night"
- "It's Impossible"
- "Jean"
- "Let Me Try Again"
- "Lisa Love Me Now"
- "Love Is All"
- "Love Letters"
- "Marta" (1931 radio fame)
- "Midnight in Paris"
- "Mon Credo" (in French)
- "Moon Over Naples" (lyrics later revised to "Spanish Eyes")
- "Music From Across the Way"
- "No Arms Can Ever Hold You"
- "Noche De Ronde" (Be Mine Tonight) (In Spanish & English, Sergio accompanies himself on guitar)
- "No Man Is an Island" (with Texas A&M Singing Cadets)
- "Once"
- "Once in Love and Nevermore"
- "Open Your Heart" (In English & Italian)
- "Serenata (Love's Melody)" (Not Neapolitan song)
- "Oh Shenandoah" (accompanying self on guitar)
- "Somehow"
- "Stardust" (English & Italian)
- "Summertime in Venice" (In English & Italian)
- "Sweet Georgia Brown"
- "Tenderly" (English & Italian)
- "The Girl From Ipanema" (English & Italian)
- "The Good Life"
- "The Lives of Me"
- "The More I See You"
- "The Most Beautiful Girl in the World (1935 song)"
- "The Night Ran Away With the Moon"
- "There Goes My Heart"
- "There's No Such Thing As Love"
- "This Heart"
- "To Give (The Reason I Live)"
- "To Love and Be Loved"
- "What Will Tomorrow Bring"
- "When Love Has Passed You By"
- "When Will It End (PJ's Theme)"
- "Why or Where or When"
- "Wind Beneath My Wings"
- "Winter Snow, Summer Rain"
- "Without You"
- "Yesterday"
- "You Stepped Out of a Dream" (In Italian & English)
- "You've Got Your Troubles"

==== Christmas and religious songs ====
- "Ave Maria (Bach/Gounod)"(in Latin)
- "Away in a Manger"
- "Buon Natale (Christmas in Rome)"
- "Hatikvah" (The Hope) (Traditional Passover song, in Hebrew)
- "It Came Upon the Midnight Clear"
- "O Come All Ye Faithful" ("Adeste Fidelis" in English)
- "O Little Town of Bethlehem"
- "Panis angelicus" (in Latin)
- "Silent Night"
- "The First Noel"
- "The Heart of Christmas (Cour' Di Natale)"
- "The Lord's Prayer"
- "Tu Scendi Dalle Stelle" (Traditional carol of Neapolitan origin) (recorded 2 versions)
