= Durium (disambiguation) =

Durium is a synthetic resin.

Durium may also refer to:

- Durium Records, an Italian record label active from 1935 to 1989
- Durium Records (UK), a UK record label active in the 1930s
- Hit of the Week Records, a US record label owned by Durium Products, and made using the material.
