= Tu scendi dalle stelle =

Christmas hymn written by Alphonsus Liguori

"Tu scendi dalle stelle" (Italian: [tu ʃˈʃendi dalle ˈstelle]; "From Starry Skies Thou Comest", "From Starry Skies Descending", "You Came a Star from Heaven", "You Come Down from the Stars") is a Christmas carol from Italy, written in 1744 by Saint Alphonsus Liguori in the musical style of a pastorale. Though found in numerous arrangements and commonly sung, it is traditionally associated with the zampogna, or large-format Italian bagpipe. The earliest known sound recording of the song was made by the baritone Rodolfo Fornari in New York City in 1915.

== History ==
The melody and original lyrics for the hymn were written by Alphonsus Liguori, a prominent Neapolitan priest and scholastic philosopher (later canonized) who founded the Redemptorist missionary order. In 1732, while staying at Convent of the Consolation, one of his order's houses in the small city of Deliceto in the province of Foggia in southeastern Italy, he wrote the Christmas song that begins "You come down from the stars" entitled "Little song to Child Jesus". This version with Italian lyrics actually came after the original song written in Neapolitan entitled "For Jesus' birth" and that begins Quanno nascette Ninno (When the child was born) and sometimes referred to as the "Carol of the Bagpipers" (Canzone d'i zampognari). Since that time, the "Little song to Child Jesus" became a widely popular Christmas carol in Italy.

"Tu scendi dalle stelle"
Damian Borkowski (tenor), Michał Biedziuk (piano)

The earliest known sound recording of "Tu scendi dalle stelle" was made by Italian baritone singer Rodolfo Fornari on September 21, 1915, in New York City, under the title "Novena Di Natale". Fornari was a member of the Boston Opera Company, and this is one of the two known recordings he made for Columbia Records.

A year later, an unknown ensemble and vocalist made a recording for Columbia, although it wasn't released until 1917. On September 24, 1917, Italian-American tenor Pasquale Feis recorded a version for Victor, now titled "Pastorale Di Natale". In later decades recordings began to surface using the original title, attributed to various composers and arrangers, including Alphonsus Liguori and Tommaso Capocci, or listed as a traditional.

There are several translations of the lyrics into English styled after that of the King James Bible; one of these translations is given below. At least one translation into modern English also exists, as well as a literal translation into English of the Neapolitan "Quanno nascette Ninno". The piece was also published in 1932 by A. Paolilli's Music Co. of Providence, Rhode Island. That version credits the music composition to Tommaso Capocci and the words to Pope Pius IX and does not mention the earlier work.

== Text and melody ==
The first two stanzas are:

1. Tu scendi dalle stelle,
O Re del Cielo,
e vieni in una grotta,
al freddo e al gelo.

O Bambino mio Divino
Io ti vedo qui a tremar,
O Dio Beato
Ahi, quanto ti costò
l'avermi amato!

2. A te, che sei del mondo
il Creatore,
mancano panni e fuoco;
O mio Signore!

Caro eletto Pargoletto,
Quanto questa povertà
più mi innamora!
Giacché ti fece amor
povero ancora!

1. You come down from the stars,
O King of Heaven,
and come into a manger,
in cold and in freezing.

O my divine baby,
I see you here trembling,
O blessed God,
Ah, how much it has cost you
to have loved me!

2. To you, who are of the world
the creator,
without clothes and fire;
Oh my Lord!

Dear chosen child,
How much does this poverty
make me love you more!
Since love made you
poor again!

1. From starry skies descending,
Thou comest, glorious King,
A manger low Thy bed,
In winter's icy sting;

O my dearest Child most holy,
Shudd'ring, trembling in the cold!
Great God, Thou lovest me!
What suff'ring Thou didst bear,
That I near Thee might be!

2. Thou art the world's Creator,
God's own and true Word,
Yet here no robe, no fire
For Thee, Divine Lord.

Dearest, fairest, sweetest Infant,
Dire this state of poverty.
The more I care for Thee,
Since Thou, O Love Divine,
Will'st now so poor to be.

== Variations and arrangements ==
Luigi Tutela composed a song titled "Novena Di Natal", which shares a striking resembles to Liguori's original tune and lyrics. It was recorded for Victor by Reverend Francis Auriemma on September 19, 1916, in New York City.

Domenico Scarlatti used the tune in his Sonata in C major, Kk513. Ottorino Respighi adopted the carol for the second movement of his Trittico botticelliano, P 151 (1927), "Adoration of the Magi".

Anthony Velona and Remo Capra arranged English lyrics upon the original musical composition for a version entitled "O Bambino" (also known as "One Cold and Blessed Winter"). This version was recorded by several singers in the late 1960s, before the history of the song was widely known, and was partly incorporated into Sergio Franchi's traditional Italian version on his 1965 recording.

Italian-American tenor Sergio Franchi originally recorded the traditional Italian version on a Durium (Italy) single (n.d.) and a Durium LP released in the US in 1965. He also recorded a slightly updated arrangement of this song on his 1965 RCA Victor Billboard Top 40 album The Heart of Christmas (Cuor' Di Natale).

Contemporary Italian composer Piero Niro has produced a composition entitled Three Variations on "Tu scendi dalle stelle" for a large orchestra (2000). Ralph Woodward has arranged the carol for unaccompanied choir.

== See also ==
- List of Christmas carols
