= Giambattista De Curtis =

Italian painter and poet (1860–1926)

- Born: 20 July 1860; Naples, Kingdom of the Two Sicilies
- Died: 15 January 1926 (aged 65); Naples, Italy

Giambattista de Curtis (20 July 1860 – 15 January 1926) was an Italian painter and poet remembered today for his song lyrics.

== Biography ==
Born into a noble family in Naples, de Curtis was the firstborn of the fresco painter Giuseppe de Curtis and his wife, Elisabetta Minnon, and was a great-grandson of composer Saverio Mercadante. He expressed his first interest in painting, which he learned from his father, and which he perfected to the point that he was called a "contemporary Salvator Rosa". He was a complete artist, writing poetry and theatrical works as well as verses for popular songs; he was also a sculptor. His love for Neapolitan song led him to collaborate with composer Vincenzo Valente, at the time a lodger at the de Curtis family palace in corso Garibaldi. It was, in fact, Valente who in 1889 set to music his first song, "A Pacchianella"; the following year, he set another of de Curtis's texts, "Muglierema come fa?". "'I Pazziava" followed in 1890, and "Ninuccia" in 1894; "Tiempe Felice" came in 1895. De Curtis never stopped writing songs and poems; it seems, however, to have never been much more for him than a way to pass the time.

De Curtis felt a great love for Sorrento, where from 1891 until 1910 he passed six months of every year at the Grand Hotel of Guglielmo Tramontano, who was mayor at the time. There, in 1892, he met Carmela Maione, who would inspire his most famous song, "Duorme Carmè'". The daughter of a tenant farmer of Tramontano's, she lived in Fuorimura. Supposedly, the subject of the song came from a conversation the two had in the lobby of the hotel; de Curtis asked the girl what she usually did, and she responded, "Sleep". This inspired de Curtis to write a song, the refrain to which begins:

Duorme Carmè: ‘o cchiù bello d’ ’a vita è ‘o ddurmì… [the best (most beautiful) thing in life is to sleep]

This was typical of his working style; when composing song lyrics he would often be inspired by some encounter or other that he had had. Indeed, de Curtis was by all accounts a curious and amiable man, and was rarely without a compliment for an attractive woman; he courted many, and would often dedicate his lyrics to them. Nevertheless, he did not wed until 1910, when, at the age of fifty and after nearly twenty years' engagement, he married Carolina Scognamiglio.

Tramontano and de Curtis were great friends, and the mayor hired him to decorate some of the rooms of the hotel with his frescos; he also painted some canvases there, and wrote poetry and songs. Among these was the celebrated song "Torna a Surriento", supposedly born of a stay in 1902 by the prime minister of Italy, Giuseppe Zanardelli, at the hotel; Tramontano asked de Curtis and his brother, Ernesto, to write a song honoring the statesman. More recent research indicates that the song may merely have been reworked for the occasion; family papers indicate that the brothers deposited a copy with the Italian Society of Authors and Editors in 1894, eight years before they claimed to have written it.

The artistic association between the de Curtis brothers bore other fruit, as well, beginning in 1897 with the publication of "'A primma vota"; it continued even after Ernesto moved to the United States in 1920, after which the two continued their collaborations by mail. Among their other songs was "Amalia", published in 1902 and dedicated to Ernesto's new wife, Amalia Russo. In 1911 the brothers had another success, the song "Lucia Lucì (I' m'arricordo 'e te)".

De Curtis moved to the Vomero quarter in 1916, living in via Luca Giordano next door to the Villa Floridiana. He continued to compose, write and paint until his death in January 1926 from a progressive paralysis. Some days after his passing a letter from Ernesto reached his house. It read:

Dear Giambattista, I enclose for you music for the song which you sent me last month; I hope it pleases you.
