= Vincenzo Valente =

Italian composer (1855–1921)

Vincenzo Valente (21 February 1855 in Corigliano Calabro – 6 September 1921 in Naples) was an Italian composer and writer. He was known for his Neapolitan songs and for his operettas.

== Life ==
Valente wrote his first piece, "Ntuniella", at the age of 15; this initiated a successful collaboration with Giambattista De Curtis. He wrote a total of ten operettas, the best known of which was I granatieri of 1889. He also wrote texts for the actor Nicola Maldacea, known for his macchiette. Valente was most famous for his songs. The most famous of which was "Tiempe belle" of 1916, with lyrics by poet Aniello Califano. His musical work was published in La Tavola Rotonda.

Valente was a member of the so-called Società dello Scorfano, an artistic society which ironically emphasized its supporters' brutishness; among its other members was the poet Ferdinando Russo.

== Works ==
=== Operettas ===
- I granatieri
- Pasquita
- Signorina Capriccio
- L'usignolo
- Vertigini d'amore

=== Songs ===
- "'A capa femmena"
- "Peppì, Comme te voglio amà"
- "'E cerase"
- "Canzona amirosa"
- "I' Pazziava"
- "'A galleria nova"
- "'A bizzuchella"
- "Canzona cafona"
- "Cammisa affatata"
- "'O campanello"
- "'A sirena"
- "Montevergine"
- "Notte sul mare"
- "'O scuitato"
- "'A cammisa"
- "Manella mia"
- "L'ammore 'n campagna,"
- "Tarantella e lariulà"
- "'O napulitano a Londra"
- "Tiempe belle"
- "Jou-jou"
- "Bambola"

== Bibliography ==
- Luigi De Bartolo – Liliana Misurelli, I suoni dell'anima. Vincenzo Valente interprete del sentimento popolare napoletano, MIT, Cosenza, 2005
- Luigi De Bartolo – Liliana Misurelli, Un ragazzo prodigio – dalla Calabria a Napoli. Aurora, Corigliano Calabro, 2007--Aznesoc 10:21, 28 set 2007 (CEST)
