= I granatieri =

I granatieri (The Grenadiers) is a 'Neapolitan operetta' in three acts by the Italian composer Vincenzo Valente with a libretto in Italian by Raffaele Della Campa and Joseph Méry. It has been called the first true Italian operetta.

== Performance history ==
I granatieri had its world premiere in Turin on 26 October 1889, presented by Luigi Maresca's theatre company. Later performances include:

- 19 May 1897 – first performance in the Teatro Amazonas in Manaus, Brazil (reprised in 1899, 1900, 1902, and 1906)
- 4 February 1898 – first performance in the Teatro Costanzi in Rome
- 12 June 1911 – New York City premiere at the Irving Place Theatre

== Roles ==
- Nini soprano
- Dorotea soprano
- Beatrice soprano
- Odoardo tenor
- Bernardo baritone
- Marchese Emilio baritone
- Giorgio bass
- John bass

== Notes and references ==
- Casaglia, Gherardo (2005)."I granatieri". L'Almanacco di Gherardo Casaglia (in Italian).
- Istituzione Casa della Musica di Parma, Intorno all'operetta
- New York Times, "Old Timers' Festival Week" 13 June 1911, p. 9 (PDF)
