= 'O surdato 'nnammurato =

Neapolitan song

"'O surdato 'nnammurato" (pronounced [o surˈdɑːtə nːamːuˈrɑːtə]; transl. "The Soldier in Love") is a famous song written in the Neapolitan language. The song is used as the anthem of S.S.C. Napoli.

The words were written by Aniello Califano and the music composed by Enrico Cannio in 1915. The song describes the sadness of a soldier who is fighting at the front during World War I, and who pines for his beloved. Originally Cannio's sheet music was published with piano accompaniment, but in recordings, on 78 rpm, then LP, Neapolitan standards such as "'O surdato 'nnammurato" have usually been orchestrated to suit each tenor.

== Lyrics ==
Original lyrics

Staje luntana da stu core
e a te volo cu 'o penziero:
niente voglio e niente spero
ca tenerte sempe a ffianco a me!
Sii sicura 'e chist'ammore
comm'i' so' sicuro 'e te...

Oje vita, oje vita mia...
oje core 'e chisto core...
si' stato 'o primm'ammore...
e 'o primmo e ll'ùrdemo sarraje pe' me!

Quanta notte nun te veco,
nun te sento 'int'a sti bbracce,
nun te vaso chesta faccia,
nun t'astregno forte 'mbraccio a me?
Ma, scetánnome 'a 'ste suonne,
mme faje chiagnere pe' te...

Oje vita, oje vita mia [...]

Scrive sempe e sta' cuntenta:
io nun penzo che a te sola...
Nu penziero mme cunzola,
ca tu pienze sulamente 'e me...
'A cchiù bella 'e tutt''e bbelle,
nun è maje cchiù bella 'e te!

Oje vita, oje vita mia [...]

English translation:

You are far away from this heart,
I fly to you in thought:
I hope and want nothing more
than always keeping you by my side!
Be sure about this love
As I am sure of you...

Oh life, oh my life...
Oh heart of this heart...
You were the first love...
and the first and last you will be for me!

How many nights have I not seen you,
not felt you in my arms,
not kissed your face,
not held you tight in my arms?!
But, waking from these dreams,
you make me cry for you...

Oh life, oh my life [...]

Always write and be happy:
I can only think of you...
One thought comforts me,
that you only think of me...
The most beautiful woman of all,
is never more beautiful than you!

Oh life, oh my life [...]

The Corrs when performing with Luciano Pavarotti used the following English lyrics for the second verse:

So many nights without you
without you in my arms
I can kiss you, I can draw you close to me
but wake up from your slumber
you make me cry for you!

== Notable performances and recordings ==
- Mario Lanza on Mario! (1958)
- Sergio Franchi on Romantic Italian Songs (1962; #17 on the Billboard Top 200)
- Franco Corelli on Passione (1963)
- Jimmy Roselli recorded the song in 1968, it reached #122 on Cashbox.
- Giuseppe di Stefano on Neapolitan Songs III (1965)
- Massimo Ranieri, based on Anna Magnani's performance in the film La sciantosa (1971)
- Luciano Pavarotti on Favourite Neapolitan Songs (1981)
- Luciano Pavarotti in duet with the Corrs (middle verse sung in English)
- Andrea Bocelli on Incanto (2008)
- Vittorio Grigolo on Arrivederci (2011)

== In other media ==
- Ninì Grassia directed a film named after the song in 1983.
