= La Tavola Rotonda =

Literary and music magazine in Italy (1891–1924)

- Categories: Literary magazine; Music magazine
- Frequency: Weekly
- Publisher: Ferdinando Bideri
- Founder: Ferdinando Bideri
- Founded: 1891
- Final issue: 1924
- Country: Italy
- Based in: Naples
- Language: Italian

La Tavola Rotonda (Italian: The Round Table) was an illustrated weekly music and literary magazine which was based in Naples, Italy. It was in circulation between 1891 and 1924.

== History and profile ==
La Tavola Rotonda was founded by Ferdinando Bideri in Naples in 1891. He was also the publisher of the magazine which came out weekly. It was originally a literary publication, but later it also covered musical texts such as romanzas and Neapolitan songs. It also featured literary, theatrical and musical reviews. The magazine hosted a song contest in 1892.

La Tavola Rotonda featured the works of Vincenzo Valente, Eduardo di Capua, Salvatore Gambardella, Pasquale Cinquegrana, Vincenzo Russo, and E. A. Mario. The magazine published a song per week, including O marenariello (Italian: Little sailors), a song by Salvatore Gambardella in 1893. In addition, the advertisements of the Piedigrotta Festival were published in the magazine, and during the preparations of the festival from August to September each year the number of songs featured was increased. Its contributors were young writers who were supporters of symbolism. Some of them included Biagio Chiara, who was also its editor-in-chief, Decio Carli, and Achille Macchia. Michele Saponaro succeeded Biagio Chiara as editor-in-chief of La Tavola Rotonda on 14 August 1908 and held the post until 28 February 1909. It folded in 1924.

The issues of La Tavola Rotonda was archived by the National Library of Naples.
