= Durium Records (UK) =

1930s UK record label

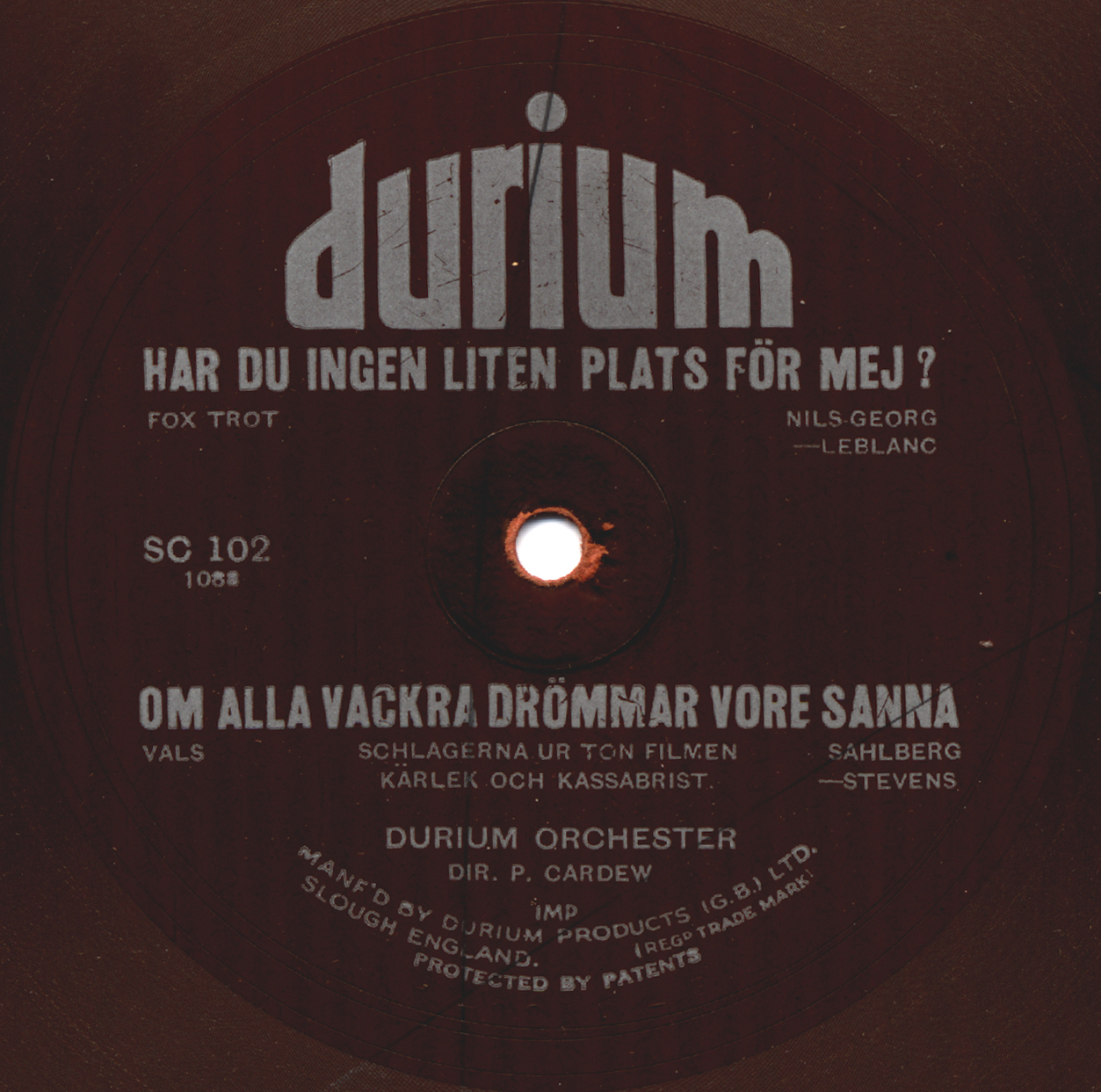
- Label of a Durium record pressed for the Swedish market.
- Founded: July, 1931
- Founder: Durium Products, Inc
- Defunct: January, 1934
- Status: Defunct
- Distributors: Durium Products, Inc
- Genre: Pop, Jazz
- Country of origin: United Kingdom
- Location: Slough, England

Durium was a short-lived record label in the United Kingdom run by Durium Products (GB) Ltd in the 1930s.

Its presses were located in Slough, near London. Its products and marketing were derived from the American record company Durium Products, Inc., producer of the Hit of the Week record label. Durium Products sold its single-sided paper gramophone records from around 1930 to 1932 whereas the UK firm operated from 1931 to 1934. Their records were also exported to other European countries, including Sweden and Denmark.

Using the fast-setting new material Durium, the label's production costs were much lower than for the shellac discs of the time. Hit of the Week discs sold for just one shilling and enjoyed great popularity.

== Bibliography ==
- Russell, Tony. (2004). Country Music Records: A Discography, 1921-1942. New York, NY: Oxford University Press, ISBN 0-19-513989-5, (Durium entry, page 31)

== See also ==
- Hit of the Week Records
- Lists of record labels
- Durium Records
