= Ernesto De Curtis =

Italian composer (1875–1937)

Ernesto De Curtis (4 October 1875 – 31 December 1937) was an Italian composer.

Born in Naples, the son of Giuseppe De Curtis and Elisabetta Minnon, he was a great-grandson of composer Saverio Mercadante and the brother of poet Giambattista De Curtis, with whom he wrote the song "Torna a Surriento". He studied piano and received a diploma from the Conservatory of San Pietro a Maiella in Naples.

He died in Naples in 1937.

== Works ==
Senza Nisciuno (Forsaken)
Sung in 1919 by Enrico Caruso (2:47)

A Guerra
Recorded in 1915 by Elvira Donnarumma (singer), Ernesto De Curtis (composer), and Libero Bovio (words), in Neapolitan language (3:22)

He wrote over a hundred songs, including:

- "Torna a Surriento" - 1902
- "Voce 'e notte" - 1904
- "Canta pe' me" - 1909
- "Non ti scordar di me" (lyrics by Libero Bovio) - 1912
- "Sona chitarra" - 1913
- "Tu ca nun chiagne" - 1915
- "Duorme Carmé'"
- "Ti voglio tanto bene"
- "Non ti scordar di me" (lyrics by Domenico Furnò) - 1935
