= Traditional music (disambiguation) =

Traditional music refers to any music reproduced and shared through musical traditions and may equally refer to:

- Art music – implies advanced structural and theoretical considerations or a written musical tradition;
  - Classical music – Western take on art music, based on classical musical traditions;
- Folk music, also known as traditional music – oral traditions or musical folklore;
  - Traditional folk music – its traditional form
- Religious music – religious musical traditions.

== See also ==
- List of classical and art music traditions
- List of folk music traditions
  - List of Asian folk music traditions
  - List of Caribbean folk music traditions
  - List of Central American folk music traditions
  - List of European folk music traditions
  - List of North American folk music traditions
  - List of Oceanic and Australian folk music traditions
  - List of South American folk music traditions
- Middle Eastern and North African music traditions
- Sub-Saharan African music traditions
