= Villa Strongoli =

The Villa Strongoli is a former rural palace located on Vittoria Veneto #1, on the Bay of Naples shoreline of Sorrento, in Campania, Italy. Since 1812 the villa buildings have been used as a hotel, the Imperial Hotel Tramontano.

== History ==
The villa was established by the Pignatelli family in the 17th century. According to local legend the property includes the house in which Torquato Tasso was born. The Pignatelli family was replaced by the aristocratic family of the Principe of Strongoli in the 18th century.

By the 19th century, like most of the seaside villas in the area, the Villa Strongoli had become a hotel. Because the ownership was advertised as English, the hotel held great appeal for British and American travellers by the end of the century. A review from 1896-1897 describes one of the managers as a Mr Doyle from Ireland, nephew of the wife of the owner. By the late 1880s, there would have been competition for Anglo-Saxon travelers from other Sorrentine seaside hotels Bristol, d'Angleterre (Villa Nardi), and Vittoria.

The hotel website history asserts that numerous 19th-century authors, in addition to royalty, have been guests at the hotel. It is also claimed, in 1902, that the popular song of Torna a Surriento was written at the request of the town's mayor and the hotel owner for Prime Minister of Italy, who was staying at this hotel.
