= Aniello Califano =

Italian poet & writer (1870–1919)

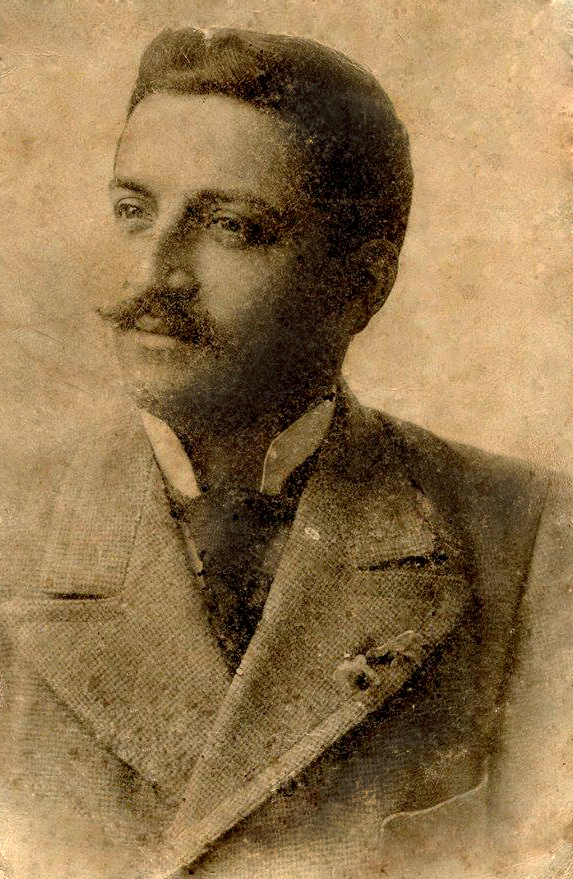
Aniello Califano

Aniello Califano (19 January 1870 in Sorrento – 20 February 1919 in Sant'Egidio del Monte Albino) was an Italian poet and writer. He was the author of numerous Neapolitan songs, the music to which was composed by various Neapolitan composers. A number of his songs, especially "'O surdato 'nnammurato", remain popular today.

== Biography ==
Aniello Michele Califano was born in Sorrento on 19 January 1870 to Alfonso Califano, an important landowner of Sant'Egidio del Monte Albino, and to local noblewoman Rosa Rispoli, related to the Fiorentino family and co-owner of the large Rispoli hotel, where the prestigious Grand Hotel Vittoria was born. He lived his childhood in his father's villa of Sant'Egidio until the age of 18.

Enrolled in the technical institute for surveyors in Naples, he began to write his first verses in the Neapolitan language. At school he excelled in Italian and history, and was taken by the first poems published by Ferdinando Russo, who was only four years older than him. For his period of study in Naples, his father rented him a small apartment in a building in Piazza Carità. In Naples, he mainly frequented places of pleasure and in one of these he met Russo, with whom he arranged an appointment to ask him for advice on some of his writings; Russo was impressed. Califano brought to Russo's attention his poems "A surrentina" and "Primma sbrasata". In Santojanni's workshop, Califano met Rocco Pagliare, Salvatore Di Giacomo, Alfonso Fiordelisi, Vincenzo Migliaro, and Arturo Colautti. In 1894, Salvatore Gambardella set to music the poem "O surdatiello", a song that Gambardella himself brought to Ferdinando Bideri, an editor of the periodical "Tavola Rotonda". In 1895, after offering the first reading to Gambardella and Di Capua, Califano began to submit his writings to various musicians. The same year, he published "Girulà", edited by Peppino Santojanni. In April of the same year, he published "Surriento 'nfesta - Hymn to be sung with guitar and mandolin accompaniment on the evening of 25 April 1895 around the statue of Torquato Tasso in Sorrento".

Upon returning to his family in Sorrento and Sant'Egidio del Monte Albino, Califano met his mother's lady-in-waiting, the pagan Stella Pepe, already twice a widow, with whom he would have four children. In 1902, he began his partnership with Enrico Cannio, with the song "Carmela mia". In 1911, he published "Ninì Tirabusciò" set to music by Gambardella: they are verses dedicated to an eccentric sciantosa who pretends to speak French. From 1915 onward, Califano decided to stay permanently in his parents' villa, where poet and musician friends often visited him. In a room on the ground floor of the villa, Califano set up a sort of small "conservatory", where the song "'O Surdato 'nnammurato" seems to have been written; he delivered the verses to Cannio. After less than a year, he published "Tiempe belle" with music by Vincenzo Valente. He wrote many unpublished poems, including one dedicated to General Armando Diaz entitled "'O paisano nuosto". In 1919, he went to Rome to offer President Woodrow Wilson a collection of verses.

== Death ==
Upon his return to Sant'Egidio, news spread that Califano had been infected with smallpox. His illness lasted almost two days. In a moment of lucidity, he recognized the parish priest of the nearby Parish of San Lorenzo Martire. He assumed extreme unction, but the priest had been called by his mother Rispoli to convince Califano to recognize his children with Stella Pepe; on his deathbed, he agreed. Even today, the heirs of Califano living in Sant'Egidio del Monte Albino bear the double surname Pepe Califano.

As soon as the news that Califano was dying of smallpox was heard in the city, a small crowd invaded the open space in front of Villa Califano in Via Crocevia (today Via Aniello Califano), hoping to obtain his personal belongings once the body had been incinerated. He died on 20 February 20 1919. His funeral was provided by a faithful family sharecropper. The coffin was transported to the municipal cemetery of Sant'Egidio del Monte Albino on an agricultural cart which, after the function, was to be publicly burned. The mortal remains of the poet were transferred to Sorrento on 11 November 1923, on the initiative of Silvio Salvatore Gargiulo.

To date, many of Califano's writings, as well as studies on the poet's life, are conducted in Sant'Egidio del Monte Albino, where digital documents and letters of the poet are archived, and where he is commemorated every February 20th.

== Songs ==
- "Ammore bbello" - Music by Francesco Paolo Frontini (1898)
- "'O surdato 'nnammurato" - Music by Enrico Cannio (1915)
- "Tiempe belle" - Music by Vincenzo Valente (1916)
- "A Psiche"
