= Il nostro concerto =

Single by Umberto Bindi
- B-side: "Tu"
- Released: 1960
- Genre: Pop
- Label: Ricordi
- Songwriter(s): Umberto Bindi, Giorgio Calabrese

Umberto Bindi singles chronology
"È vero" (1960)	"Il nostro concerto" (1960)	"Se ci sei" (1960)

Audio
- "Il nostro concerto" on YouTube

"Il nostro concerto" is a 1960 Italian song composed by Umberto Bindi (music) and Giorgio Calabrese (lyrics). The song premiered at the Italian Music Festival in New York, in which was performed by Miranda Martino and placed third. It eventually was Bindi's major hit, whose version topped the Italian hit parade for several months.

The symphonic structure of the song was inspired by Richard Addinsell's "Warsaw Concerto".

"Il nostro concerto" was covered by numerous artists, including Claudio Baglioni, Claudio Villa, Sergio Franchi, Renato Zero, Giuseppe Di Stefano, Peppino di Capri, José Carreras, Massimo Ranieri, Demis Roussos, Les Compagnons de la chanson, Steve Lawrence, Gino Latilla, Bob Azzam, Franck Pourcel, Pino Calvi, Jimmy Fontana, Fausto Papetti, Franco Simone, Luciano Tajoli, Christian, Paola Musiani.

== Track listing ==
7" single – SRL 10-137

1. "Il nostro concerto" (Umberto Bindi, Giorgio Calabrese)
2. "Tu" (Umberto Bindi, Giorgio Calabrese)

== Charts ==
Chart	Peak position
Italy	1
