= Enrico Cannio =

Italian musician & composer (1874–1949)

Enrico Cannio (January 10, 1874 in Naples – January 30,1949 in Naples) was an Italian musician and composer. He initially received a diploma in piano to become an orchestra conductor; he spent his whole life in Naples, and during his career he worked at three singing schools in the city. He also led three local theatre orchestras, at the Eden, the Umberto, and the Trianon. He wrote for the majority of local song publishers, and collaborated with artists such as Libero Bovio, Ernesto Murolo, and Aniello Califano. His most popular song, to a text by Califano, was "'O surdato 'nnammurato", published in 1915. Among his other popular songs, to texts or Libero Bovio, were "A serenata 'e Pulecenella", "Tarantella luciana" and "Carufanella".

== Songs ==
- "Oj ma', dammillo" (1901)
- "Carmela mia!" (1903)
- "'E difiette d'e ffemmene" (1907)
- "A fussetella" (1908)
- "'O scialacquone" (1908)
- "A luntananza d'o suldato" (1909)
- "Tarantella luciana" (1913)
- "Carufanella" (1914)
- "Vola e va..." (1914)
- "'O Surdato 'Nnamurato" (1915)
- "Povere figliole" (1915)
- "A serenata 'e Pulecenella" (1916)
- "Canta, Mara" (1916)
- "Surdato italiano" (1916)
- "Margaretè" (1917)
- "'O surdato 'e malavita" (1917)
- "Zetella" (1917)
- "Cara sposina" (1918)
- "Passa appriesso" (1918)
- "'O portavoce" (1921)
- "L'appuntamento" (1923)
- "Maistà" (1925)
- "'O squilibrato" (1931)
- "Rusella 'e maggio" (1939).

== Bibliography ==
- Ettore de Mura - Enciclopedia della Canzone Napoletana, Casa Editrice IL TORCHIO, Napoli 1969
