= Salvatore Cardillo =

Italian-American composer

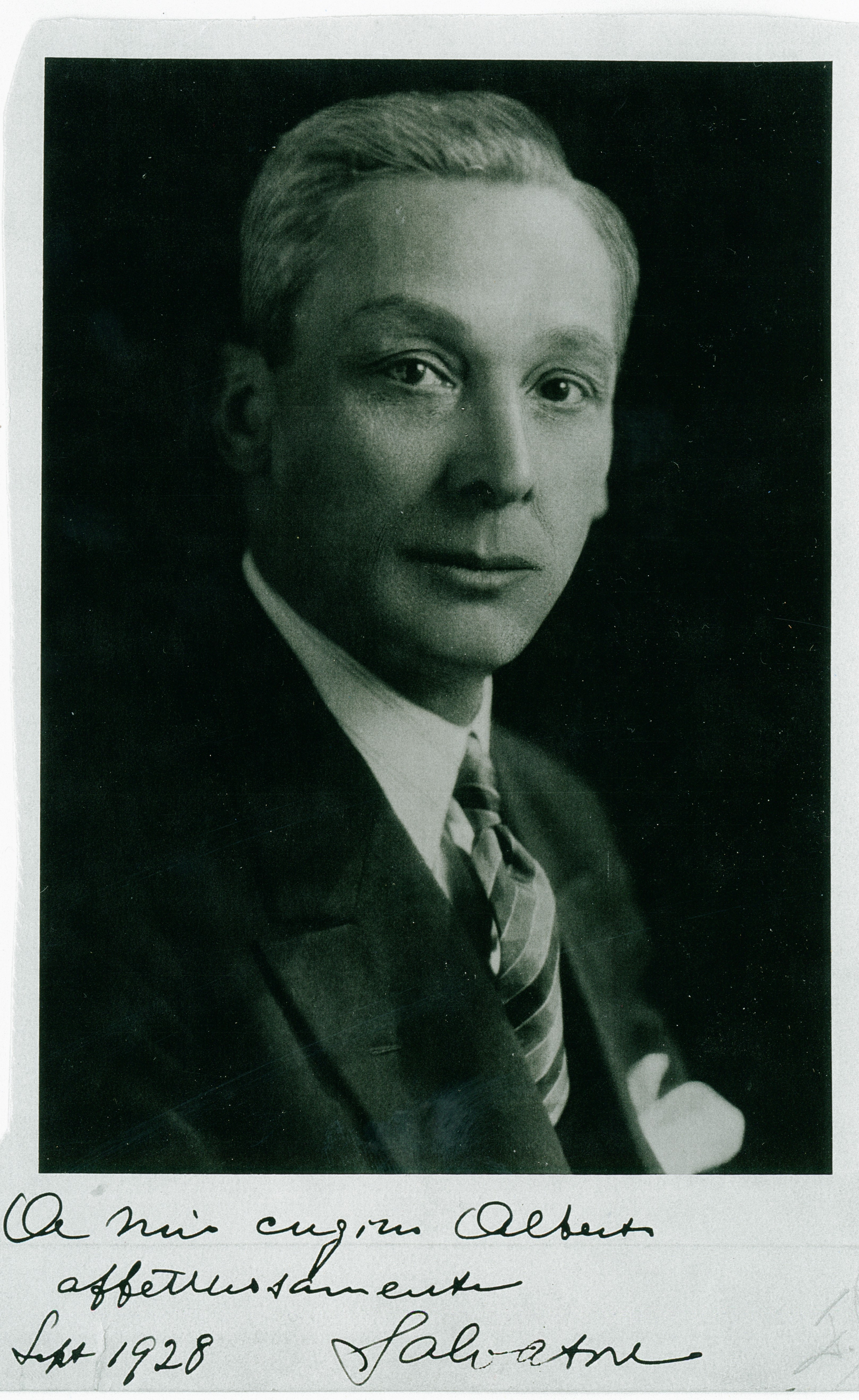
- Salvatore Cardillo, 1928
- Born: Salvatore Cardillo; 20 February 1874; Naples, Italy
- Died: 5 February 1947 (aged 72); New York City

Salvatore Cardillo (20 February 1874 – 5 February 1947) was an Italian-American composer. Born in Naples, he studied piano and composition in Italy before emigrating in 1903 to the United States as a university graduate. His career encompassed songwriting and movie music. He died in New York.

Cardillo's richly scored and still popular 1911 romance Core 'ngrato (Ungrateful Heart) — also known by its lyric Catarì, Catarì, pecchè me dici sti parole amare — was written in America to a text in Neapolitan by Alessandro Sisca (Riccardo Cordiferro); it is in fact the only famous Neapolitan song by an Italian-American immigrant. The song's first exponent was the operatic tenor Enrico Caruso, but it is not clear whether he commissioned it. Franco Corelli, Luciano Pavarotti, Giuseppe di Stefano, José Carreras and, more recently, Roberto Alagna and Jonas Kaufmann are among the tenors to have included Core 'ngrato in their repertories.

The composer also wrote the songs Barcarola, to a text by Edoardo San Giovanni, and Oi luna (O Silvery Moon), to a text by Riccardo Cordiferro. These were published in 1921 as "Two Neapolitan Songs" by G. Schirmer Inc. in New York.
