= Durium =

Highly durable synthetic resin

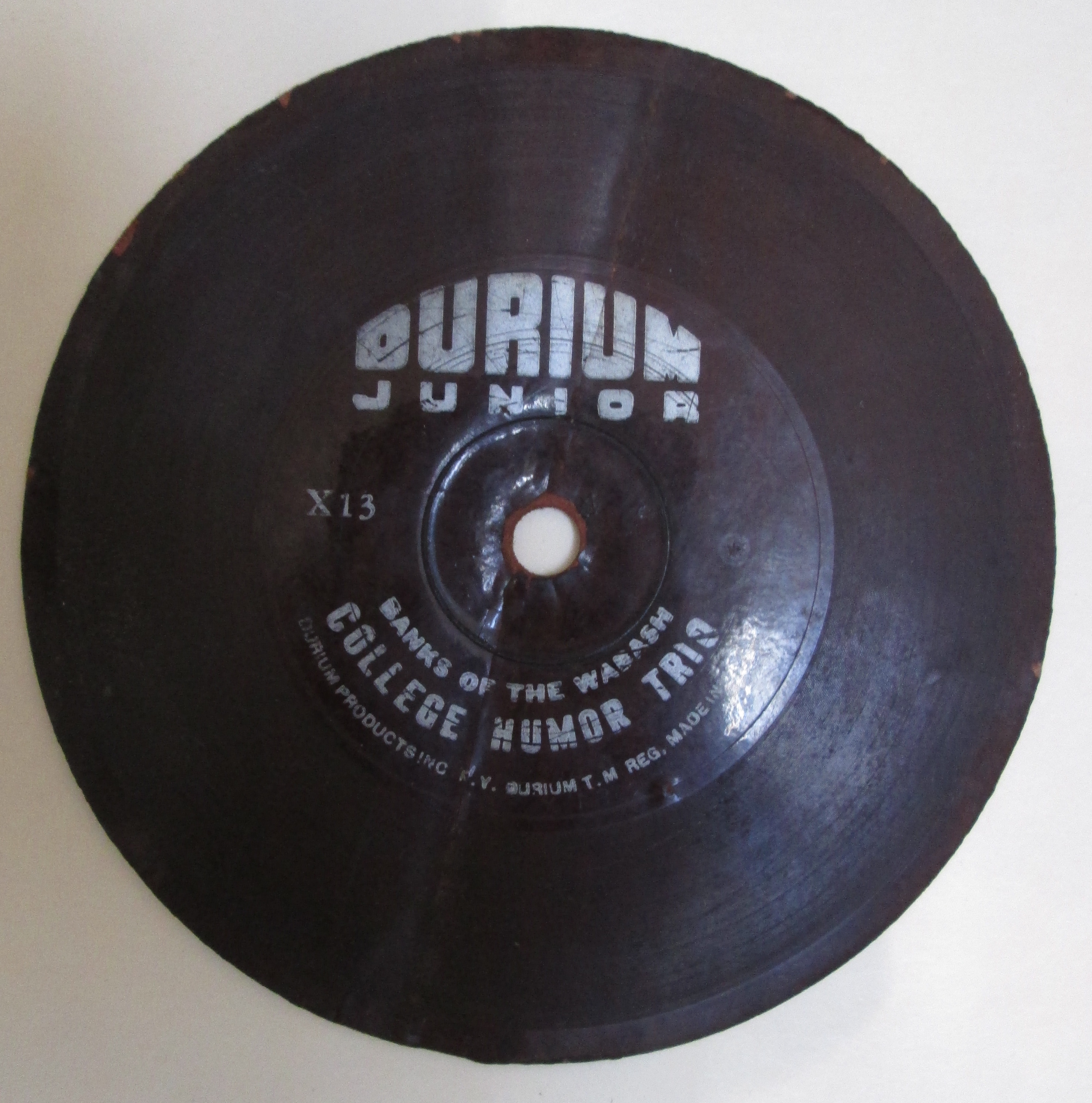
A record made of Durium

Durium is a highly durable synthetic resin developed in 1929. It was used in phonograph records, as well as in the casting process for metallic type and in the aeronautics industry.

== Origin ==
It is a resorcinol-formaldehyde resin, the result of research by Hal T. Beans, professor of chemistry at Columbia University.

== Properties ==
The resin is flexible, tasteless, odorless, fire and waterproof. It is highly resistant to heat and was heated to 230 °C (446 °F) in production of records. It is fast-setting, reducing the production cost of items made from it.

== Applications ==
Being resistant to fire and water, the resin was used as a substitute for varnish on aeronautical parts.

It was commercialized by Durium Products Company (renamed Durium Products, Inc., from 1931) as the medium for Hit of the Week records, from 1930 to 1932. The resin was bonded to a cardboard substrate and, being much lighter than its competitor shellac, was sold at newsstands for only 15 cents per disc.

== See also ==
- Durium Records (UK)
