= Core 'ngrato =

Neapolitan love song

Song by Enrico Caruso
- Language: Neapolitan
- Released: 1911
- Genre: Canzone Napoletana
- Composer: Salvatore Cardillo
- Lyricist: Riccardo Cordiferro

Audio sample
- Performance by the United States Air Force Band's Singing Sergeants: file; help

"Core 'ngrato" (Neapolitan: [ˈkɔːrə ŋˈɡrɑːtə]; "Ungrateful Heart"), also known by the first words "Catarì, Catarì" (short and dialectal form for Caterina, a female first name), is a 1911 Neapolitan song by emigrant American composer Salvatore Cardillo with lyrics by Riccardo Cordiferro (real name Alessandro Sisca).

It was adopted by Enrico Caruso but it is not known whether he commissioned Cardillo and Sisca to write it. It is the only well-known standard Neapolitan song to have been written in America.

In the song, Catarì's lover reproaches the girl for thoughtlessly and heartlessly rejecting his abiding love for her; he implores her not to forget that he has given her his heart and that his soul is in torment; and he says he has confessed his feelings to a priest, who advised him to let her go.

The song's title comes from the heartfelt passage, Core, core 'ngrato, te haie pigliato 'a vita mia! Tutt' è passato, e nun nce pienze cchiù!, which approximates in English to "Ungrateful heart, you have stolen my life! It's all over and you don't think about it any more!".

The song was sung in the season three finale of The Sopranos by Dominic Chianese in character as Corrado "Junior" Soprano Jr.

== The Caruso Recording ==
The second stanza in the recording by Enrico Caruso presents a variant to the text. Caruso's own copy of the sheet music is in his archives, held in the Peabody Institute at Johns Hopkins University. The variant is found written in Caruso's hand. The digitized score is accessible at https://peabody.contentdm.oclc.org/digital/collection/p16613coll8/id/304/rec/47

E l'aggio ditto ca pe stu dulure Catarì, vurria muri'.

Catarì, sto a suffri' nun 'nze po credere,

Sto a suffri' tutte li pene,

E c'una fede che na cosa santa

Aspetta chesta grazia o sta cundanna.

(And I said, that because of this pain, Catarì, I wish to die.

Catarì, I suffer so, no one can believe,

I suffer so every anguish, ah,

And by a faith, a sacred thing,

I await a pardon or I await execution.)

== Covers ==
- xxxx - Enrico Caruso (78 rpm) (Disco "Grammofono" – D.B. 142); 1960 album Addio mia bella Napoli (Goodbye my beautiful Naples) (RCA Victor – LM 20080)
- 1937 - Tino Rossi (78 rpm) with the title Catarì! Catarì! (Columbia Records – BF 39); 1963 album Chansons de mes films (Songs from my movies) (Columbia Records – FSX 146)
- 1943 - Carlo Buti (78 rpm) (Columbia Records - D 13001); album A life for the song vol. 1 (TIMA Club)
- 1951 - Claudio Villa (78 rpm) (Parlophon – TT 9513); album Claudio Villa (Parlophon – PMDQ. 8008)
- 1952 - Roberto Murolo (78 rpm) (durium, AI 9908); 1963 album Napoletana from 1909 to 1915 (durium, ms AI 77074)
- 1953 - Giuseppe Di Stefano (78 rpm) (His Master's Voice – D.A.2043); album Neapolitan Songs (His Master's Voice – BLP 1052)
- 1955 - Mario Del Monaco (78 rpm) (London Records – P.18214); album Italian Song Recital (RCA Victor – LM 20080)
- 1955 - Tito Schipa album Chansons napolitaines (Neapolitan songs) (Vogue Durium – DVM 90005)
- 1957 - Beniamino Gigli album 'na sera 'e maggio (One evening in May) (La voce del padrone - QALP 10186)
- 1958 - Rinus Van Essen (single) with the title Catari, Catari text by De Vos, (CNR – UH 9773)
- 1959 - Franco Corelli (EP) (Angel Records - AA-4014); album Neapolitan Songs (Angel Records - ANG. 35852)
- 1961 - Luciano Tajoli (Odeon Records - MSOQ 5290); 1963 album Luciano Tajoli (Odeon Records - MOCQ 5010)
- 1965 - Burt Blanca (single) (Hebra Records - 329); album Burt Blanca and The King Creole's – Vol. 3 (Epn – EPN 3220)
- 1967 - The Maze (single) in English with title Catari Catari text by G. Fields (MGM Records – MGM 1368)
- 1985 - Luciano Pavarotti album Napoli: Tre voci un'anima Vol. 1 (Naples: Three voices one soul) (G & G Records – TGGK 72)
- 1977 - Giancarlo Pica (single) (Dig-It International Records – DG 1147)
- 1978 - José Carreras (single) (Philips – 422 936-2); album José Carreras (Philips – 95 00 584)
- 1996 - Mina Naples (PDU – PMA 790)
- 2005 - Renata Tebaldi Arie da opere-III e canzone (Arias from operas-III and song) (Hobby & Work Hobby & Work Publishing – ORT004)
- 2006 - Plácido Domingo album Italia, ti amo (Italy, I love you) (Deutsche Grammophon – 00289 477 6086), released in Germany and Ukraine
- 2016 - Il Volo with Plácido Domingo Notte magica (Magic night) (Sony Masterworks – 0889853519620)
- 2016 - Jonas Kaufmann with the title Catarì, Catarì in the double album Dolce vita (Sweet life) (Sony Classical – 88875183631)
- xxxx - Sam Le Cuisinier Troubadour with Pierre Spiers Trio (EP) with the title Catari (Century – 6934)
