= Hit of the Week Records =

Hit of the Week Record
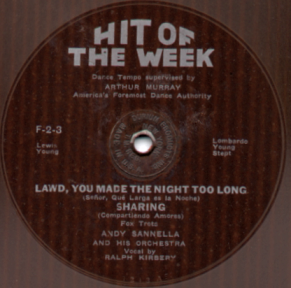
- Label featuring the orchestra of Andy Sannella, May 1932
- Parent company: Durium Products Corporation
- Founded: 1930
- Founder: Durium Products Corporation
- Defunct: 1932
- Genre: Pop, jazz
- Country of origin: U.S.
- Location: New York City, U.S.

Hit of the Week was an American record label founded in 1930 that sold low-priced records made of Durium instead of the usual shellac.

== History ==
Around 1930, several types of thin, flexible records made of various plastic formulations were introduced in Europe, such as the German Phonycord, French Pathé Cellodisc, British Filmophone and Goodson, and Spanish Delfos records. In the US, this short-lived trend was represented by Hit of the Week records, which were made of a sturdy brown paper base coated with Durium, a lightweight synthetic resin. The records tended to have a low-frequency rumble due to their texture, and their audio fidelity was generally inferior than most ordinary shellac records of the time. Unusually, Hit of the Week records were recorded on one side only, an early practice in the disc record industry which most other manufacturers had generally abandoned around 1910. As a consequence of being uncoated on the other side, they have a strong tendency to curl and now often require the use of a clip or weight around the turntable spindle to keep them sufficiently flat during play. A few releases had the performer's portrait printed on the uncoated paper side, or were imprinted there with advertising matter. They were issued in flimsy rice paper sleeves, few of which have survived.

A new issue featuring a current "hit" popular song was released every week. Unlike other records, they were sold at newsstands. Previous issues could be obtained by mail order. Retailing for 15 cents each, later raised to 20 cents, Hit of the Week records were by far the lowest-priced records in the US at that time.

The first regular issue was released in February 1930. By the summer of 1930, up to half a million copies of each week's issue were produced. But as the Depression worsened, sales slumped. In March 1931 the company went into receivership and in May it was purchased by the Erwin, Wasey & Company advertising agency. A new format debuted in August, featuring two songs or dance tunes on each single-sided disc and a total playing time of about five minutes, but the label remained unprofitable. The final Hit of the Week issue was released in June 1932.

After the demise of the label, some limited use was made of smaller (often only four inches in diameter) records made of the same material, mostly for giveaway advertising novelties. Specimens of one of the most common advertising records, which invited the recipient to come see the new 1932 Chevrolet automobile, are usually found with a mailing label and postage on the uncoated back side.

Musicians who recorded for Hit of the Week included Gene Austin, Duke Ellington and His Orchestra (under the pseudonym "Harlem Hot Chocolates"), Ben Pollack, Eddie Cantor (on a special 25 cent "Durium De Luxe" issue), Morton Downey, and Rudy Vallée. Most of the arrangements were performed by studio musicians in New York, led by Adrian Schubert, Bert Hirsch, Vincent Lopez, Don Voorhees, and Phil Spitalny. Jazz "breaks" by instrumental stars such as Joe Venuti and Eddie Lang enlivened some recordings. The vocalists who recorded with the studio bands included several popular radio singers of the period, such as Ralph Kirbery and Helen Rowland.

In the UK, a similar series was issued on the Durium label.

== See also ==
- List of record labels

== Discographies ==
- Hit of the Week Discography, Hans Koert (Heinkenszand, The Netherlands) (1994–2007)
- Durium (GB) Discography, Hans Koert (Heinkenszand, The Netherlands) (1994–2007)
- Durium Advertisement and Custom Records Discography, Hans Koert (The Netherlands) (1994–2007)
