= Torna a Surriento =

1894 Italian song

Song
- Published: 1894
- Genre: Neapolitan
- Composer: Ernesto De Curtis
- Lyricist: Giambattista De Curtis

"Torna a Surriento" (Neapolitan: [ˈtɔrn(ə) a ssurˈrjendə]) is a Neapolitan song composed in 1894 by Italian musician Ernesto De Curtis to words by his brother, the poet and painter Giambattista De Curtis. The song was copyrighted officially in 1905, and has become one of the most popular of this traditional genre; others include "'O sole mio", "Funiculì funiculà", and "Santa Lucia".

== History ==
Tradition holds that the origin of the song dates to 1902, when Guglielmo Tramontano, mayor of Sorrento, asked his friend Giambattista De Curtis to write the song for the Prime Minister Giuseppe Zanardelli, then vacationing at his seaside hotel, the Imperial Hotel Tramontano; it was claimed that the piece was meant to celebrate Zanardelli's stay.

Some claim the song is a plea to Zanardelli to keep his promise to help the impoverished city of Sorrento, which was especially in need of a sewage system. The song reflects the beauty of the city's great surroundings and the love and passion of its citizens.

More recent research indicates that the song may merely have been reworked for the occasion; family papers indicate that the brothers deposited a copy with the Italian Society of Authors and Editors in 1894, eight years before they claimed to have written it.

== Neapolitan lyrics ("Torna a Surriento") ==
Vide 'o mare quant'è bello!
Spira tantu sentimento,
Comme tu a chi tiene mente,
Ca scetato 'o faje sunnà.

Guarda, guà chistu ciardino;
Siente, siè 'sti sciure 'arancio:
'Nu prufumo accussì fino
Dinto 'o core se ne va.

E tu dice: "Io parto, addio!"
T'alluntane da 'stu core.
Da 'sta terra de ll'ammore
Tiene 'o core 'e nun turnà?

Ma nun me lassà,
Nun darme 'stu turmiento!
Torna a Surriento,
Famme campà!

Vide 'o mare de Surriento,
Che tesore tene 'nfunno:
Chi ha girato tutt' 'o munno,
Nun ll'ha visto comm'a ccà!

Guarda attuorno, 'sti Ssirene
Ca te guardano 'ncantate
E te vonno tantu bbene,
Te vulessero vasà!

E tu dice: "Io parto, addio!"
T'alluntane da 'stu core.
Da 'sta terra de ll'ammore
Tiene 'o core 'e nun turnà?

Ma nun me lassà,
Nun darme 'stu turmiento!
Torna a Surriento,
Famme campà!

== English translation ("Come Back to Sorrento") ==
Claude Aveling wrote the English-language lyrics, which are titled "Come Back to Sorrento".

Look at the sea, how beautiful it is,
it inspires so many emotions,
like you do with the people you look at,
who you make to dream while they are still awake.

Look at this garden
and the scent of these oranges,
such a fine perfume,
it goes straight into your heart,

And you say: "I am leaving, goodbye."
You go away from this heart of mine,
away from this land of love,
And have you the heart not to come back?

But do not leave me,
do not give me this torment.
Come back to Surriento,
make me live!

Look at the sea of Surriento,
what a treasure it is!
Even who has travelled all over the world,
has never seen a sea like this one.

Look at these mermaids
that stare, amazed, at you,
that love you so much.
They would like to kiss you,

And you say: "I am leaving, goodbye."
You go away from my heart,
away from the land of love,
And have you the heart not to come back?

But please do not leave me,
do not give me this torment.
Come back to Surriento,
make me live!

== Recordings ==
"Torna a Surriento" has been sung by performers as diverse as:

- Ahmad Zahir
- Alfie Boe
- Anatoliy Solovianenko
- Anna Calvi
- Anna German
- Beniamino Gigli
- Bing Crosby recorded a version titled "The Story of Sorrento" on December 11, 1947, with Victor Young and His Orchestra.
- A comedic version by Billy Connolly entitled "Saltcoats at the Fair".
- Bono
- Connie Francis
- Dean Martin recorded a version adapted by Joseph J. Lilley entitled "Take Me In Your Arms" on his album Dino: Italian Love Songs (1962).
- Elīna Garanča
- Elvis Presley released a version re-arranged and with new English lyrics by Doc Pomus and Mort Shuman entitled "Surrender" in 1961.
- Enrico Caruso
- Francesco Albanese
- Franco Corelli
- Frank Sinatra
- Giuseppe Di Stefano
- Il Volo
- Jerry Adriani
- Jerry Vale
- José Carreras
- Karel Gott
- Katherine Jenkins and Norton Buffalo with George Kahumoku Jr.
- Luciano Pavarotti
- Mario Lanza
- Meat Loaf
- Muslim Magomayev
- Nino Martini
- Plácido Domingo

External audio
- You may hear "Torna a Surriento" (with Italian lyrics) as sung by the lyric tenor Richard Tucker with Alfredo Antonini and the Columbia Concert Orchestra in 1950; Here on archive.org

- Richard Tucker
- Robertino Loreti
- Roberto Alagna
- Roberto Carlos
- Ruggero Raimondi
- Sergio Franchi covered the song for his 1962 RCA Victor Red Seal debut album (Romantic Italian Songs), which peaked at No. 17 on the Billboard Top 200.
- Zhanna Aguzarova

== In popular culture ==
- In the television show The Honeymooners, Ralph Kramden identifies the song in preparing for his appearance on a quiz show called The $99,000 Answer. When his neighbor, Mrs. Manicotti, tries to stump him by singing a few bars of the song to him, He mistakenly identifies it as "Take Me Back to Sorrento" and says it was written by "Ernesto Dequisto". Upon hearing his answer, Mrs Manicotti says: "I give up!"
- The song was featured throughout the 1954 film Seagulls Over Sorrento where it was played by actor David Orr on the concertina.
- In his 2025 film Bono: Stories of Surrender, the titular musician Bono recalls several instances in his life when his father, a tenor, would refuse to acknowledge his son's fame, dismissively referring to him as a 'baritone who thinks he's a tenor'. The movie ends with Bono eulogizing his late father and then 'proving' that he has become a tenor by singing the last two verses of "Torna A Surriento" to conclude the movie.
