= Sergio Franchi =

Italian-American tenor and actor (1926–1990)

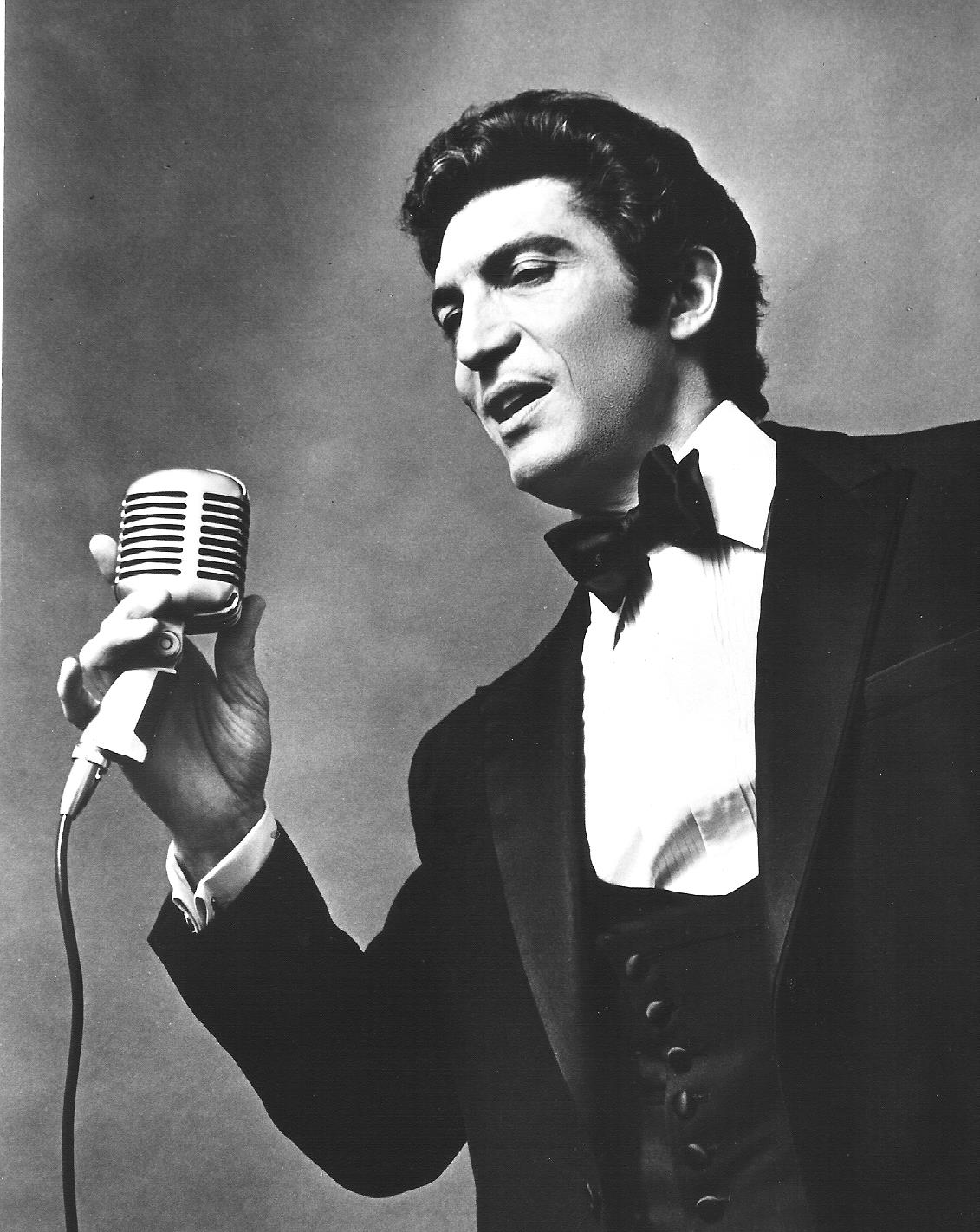
- Franchi in 1970

Background information
- Born: Sergio Franci Galli; April 6, 1926; Codogno, Lombardy, Italy
- Died: May 1, 1990 (aged 64) Stonington, Connecticut, U.S.
- Genres: Traditional pop; Neapolitan and Italian songs; show tunes; opera; operatic pop; soft-rock
- Occupations: Singer; actor; entertainer
- Instruments: Voice; guitar; piano
- Years active: 1953–1989
- Labels: RCA Victor; Columbia Records; United Artists Records; Metromedia; Durium Records
- Website: www.sergiofranchi.com

Sergio Franchi (US: /ˈfrɑːŋki/ FRAHNG-kee, Italian: [ˈsɛrdʒo ˈfraŋki]; born Sergio Franci Galli; April 6, 1926 – May 1, 1990) was an Italian-American tenor and actor who enjoyed success in the United States and internationally after gaining notice in Britain in the early 1960s. In 1962, RCA Victor signed him to a seven-year contract and in October of that year Franchi appeared on The Ed Sullivan Show and performed at Carnegie Hall. Sol Hurok managed Franchi's initial American concert tour.

Franchi became a headliner in Las Vegas, and starred in concerts and cabarets on several continents. His earliest ambitions and studies had been directed toward an operatic career, but he instead found his niche in popular and romantic music. Franchi performed musical comedies on stage, appeared on numerous television variety shows, and starred in a major motion picture. He became an American citizen in 1972. After gaining success, Franchi was a benefactor and philanthropist, donating his time and talent to many causes. For his longtime support of Boys' and Girls' Towns of Italy, he was posthumously awarded the title of cavaliere in the Order of Merit (Stella al merito del lavoro) by the Italian Government.

== Early life in Italy ==
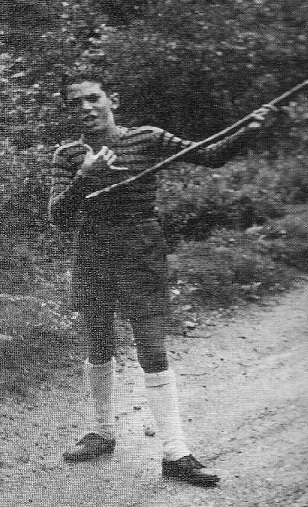
Young Sergio Franci Galli in Italy in 1936

Sergio Franci Galli was one of three children born to a Neapolitan father and Genoese mother. Sergio, Mirella, and Fausta (17 years younger than the elder siblings) were all born in the region of Lombardy. This includes Milan, Cremona, and the smaller village of Codogno – where he was born. Some geographical over-simplifications resulted in listing Franchi's birthplace as Cremona, and Fausta's birthplace as "near Milan". Because the family also lived in Cremona, Franchi called both Codogno and Cremona his "hometown" at different periods in his life. Franchi stated for the record several times in later life that his birthplace was Codogno in the province of Lodi. An uncle who owned a vineyard in Alassio, on the Italian Riviera, was instrumental in family life on various occasions.

As a child, Franchi sang for the family with his father, who played the piano and guitar. At age ten, he sang a comic role as a hunchback in a school play. Young Franchi formed a three-piece band at age sixteen to earn pocket money, and then later sang with a male vocal group in local jazz clubs. But, in spite of his musical talents, he soon followed his father's wishes that he pursue a career in engineering. Franchi pursued, but did not finish this training. The senior Galli had been a successful businessman who owned several shops, but lost all of his assets during World War II and the German occupation. After the war, he became friendly with a Captain in the South African medical corps who was stationed nearby. He soon followed the officer's suggestion that South Africa would be a land of more opportunity, and he immigrated to Johannesburg. The family followed in 1947 (Fausta was four years old) when Franchi completed his compulsory military service at age twenty-one.

== Career ==
=== Early career in South Africa ===
When the family arrived in Johannesburg, they found that the senior Galli, a skilled wood craftsman, had established a successful furniture factory. Young Franchi began using his skills as an architectural draftsman and worked for his father as a designer of commercial and industrial interiors. He also began singing in informal concerts of Italian music. His voice attracted growing attention. Hearing him sing, one of the principals of the Johannesburg Operatic and Dramatic Society (JODS) tracked him down and offered him the leading role in The Gypsy Baron. (Franchi's sister Dana Valery played one of the children.) Speaking little English at the time, he learned the role phonetically. Franchi's debut was well-received, and was soon followed by leading roles in Pink Champagne (Die Fledermaus in English)(1953), The New Moon (1954), and The Vagabond King (1955). Johannesburg's once-thriving local opera season had collapsed after WWII, and it was not possible at this time to earn a full-time wage as a singer.

Alessandro Rota, a successful operatic tenor in the Southern Hemisphere, came from Cape Town to Johannesburg in 1955 and helped form The National Opera Association. Rota began making a difference by producing operatic concerts, full acts from operas, and then full opera productions. Under Rota's tutelage, Franchi's voice matured, and he expanded his vocal range and technique. About his first experience with the fledgling opera company in a production of Carmen, Franchi later stated this initial experience was a disaster: He sang the tenor part in Italian, the baritone sang in Russian, and the soprano sang her role in French. The company quickly matured and Rota placed Franchi in leading tenor roles in at least two successful full opera productions – Puccini's Madama Butterfly in 1957, and then Verdi's La traviata in 1959. Some references also list Franchi singing lead performances in Verdi's Rigoletto and Puccini's La boheme.

Sometime after the 1956 London production of Grab Me a Gondola premiered, Franchi performed in a Johannesburg stage production of the musical, and made his very first recording with the cast.

With these experiences, Franchi returned to Italy, aspiring for more opportunities to become an opera singer. While on a performing tour of South Africa, Beniamino Gigli had heard Franchi sing and had encouraged him and his family in this regard. In 1959 Franchi made an important contact with an English agent, James Gilmore, who encouraged Franchi to meet with him if he came to London.

=== Return to Europe ===
Franchi had some success when he was leaving Italy in 1959, such as being among the 10 finalists in a La Scala competition with 250 other singers. He was also offered the role of Cavaradossi in Tosca, which he played in a minor opera house. Looking back in 1983 about hoping to make it in Italian opera, Franchi stated that he didn't think he was in his right mind: "I was a dreamer." At the time he believed he was doing well, so he sent for his wife and children. However employment opportunities ceased, and within a year Franchi was broke.

Franchi then looked for work in Italy while his wife and children remained in South Africa. He began recording with Durium Records for the popular market, having hits with "more mio" and "I tuoi occhi verde." An album of Italian songs and several EPs and singles in Italy, London, and Canada followed (these recordings were eventually released for American audiences.) As a result of his personal appearances and recordings, Franchi began drawing enough attention to become tracked on Billboard. In early 1960, Franchi played the role of Janni in the short-lived London production of The Golden Touch. His singing performance received favorable reviews. His London agent, James Gilmore, arranged several TV appearances for Franchi, and that work (and political changes in South Africa) allowed him to return to his family in London.

Franchi then made several appearances on ATV's Startime. And then, during a two-week engagement at the London Palladium, he made two TV appearances on Sunday Night at the London Palladium; a show that launched the career of many performers, and the most popular TV show in Britain. Franchi's second Palladium TV show led to a series of events that launched Franchi's American fame. Viewing his performance that night was Norman Luboff, who alerted RCA Victor about him. A recording audition was arranged via two taped selections sent to New York.

With RCA approval, Luboff facilitated Franchi's signature on an exclusive seven-year recording contract. RCA Victor issued his records on the prestigious Red Seal label. He soon recorded his first RCA Victor album, in London. Plans for an American tour also soon followed.

=== Success in America ===
==== 1960s ====
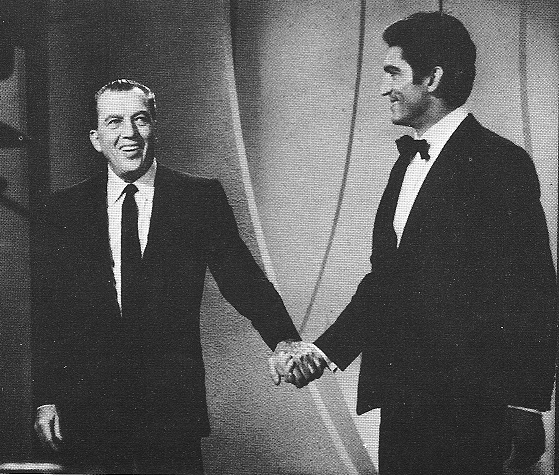
Franchi on The Ed Sullivan Show.

Franchi arrived in New York on September 25, 1962. RCA Victor had begun a heavy promotional campaign to launch his American career, concurrent with the release of his debut album. Franchi made his American television debut with an appearance on The Ed Sullivan Show on October 14, 1962; and his Sol Hurok concert debut at Carnegie Hall on October 21, 1962. Singing the full length of the concert without a microphone, a New York reviewer commented on Franchi's "big, healthy voice", his penchant for ad-libbing, and his ability to establish instant rapport with his audience.

Ed Sullivan was in the audience that night and soon contracted for future Franchi appearances—including a second TV appearance on his show the following week (October 28, 1962). Franchi would later become one of Sullivan's "two or three most favorite guests,", and appeared 24 times. Sales for the debut record did well, peaking on the Billboard 200 at number 17 at the end of December. The year was concluded with successful concert appearances in Washington, D.C.'s Constitution Hall and in Boston's Music Hall

Franchi made his nightclub debut at the Empire Room of the Waldorf-Astoria in New York City. While he was there he met Metropolitan Opera soprano Anna Moffo, with whom he was to collaborate on two RCA Victor albums that year. Franchi continued to have many successful appearances at many large venues, including one with Barbra Streisand, as well as more Sullivan television appearances.

He soon made his Las Vegas debut at the Sahara Hotel as the opening act for Bob Newhart. These successful performances were interspersed with multiple European events. Franchi recorded three more albums for RCA Victor (see discography), all three of which peaked on the Billboard 200 pop charts in 1963. His debut album, Romantic Italian Songs continued on the Billboard 200; He completed the year as the opening act for Juliet Prowse at the Cocoanut Grove.

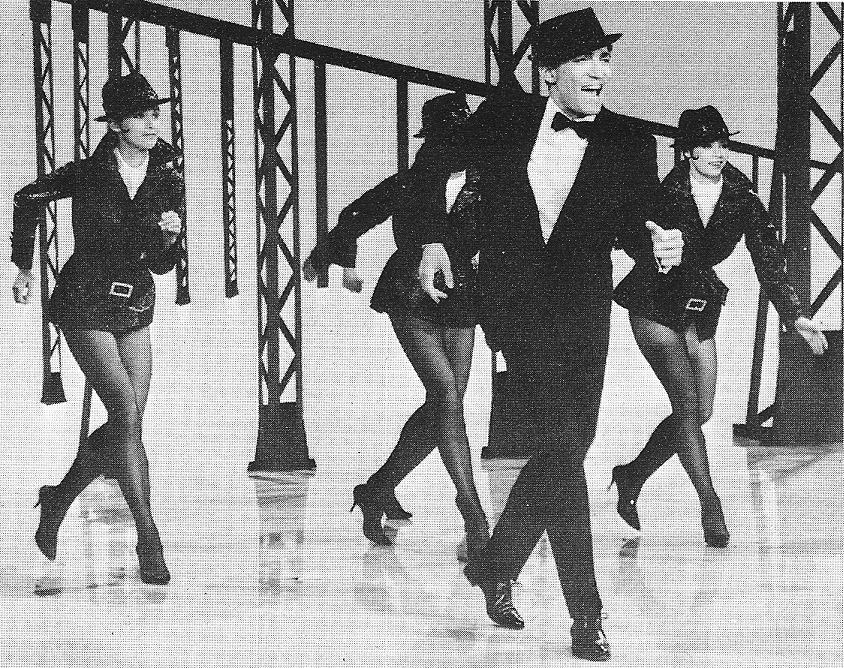
Franchi and the Nick Castle Dancers performing in the Meredith Willson Special (1964).

Franchi's February 1964 appearance at the Sahara Hotel in Las Vegas attracted the attention of Time magazine, as his performance garnered more attention and popularity than that of the star performer, including getting "standing ovations and multiple encores." Franchi's singing, dancing, and comedy, were then prominently featured on six television specials. Franchi made a noteworthy appearance at the "35th Annual Chicagoland Music Festival" in August 1964, as well as starring in a performance at the Cocoanut Grove, as well as doing other events. While at Cocoanut Grove, he recorded his Sergio Franchi - Live! at The Cocoanut Grove album.

1964 was a significant year for Franchi for professional and personal reasons. In a move to attract more mainstream pop audiences, RCA Victor switched Franchi from the Red Seal label to their standard black pop label. He also changed his professional representation to the William Morris Agency. Although he had already received offers to star in several films, Franchi did not find a role he wished to play for a few more years. Franchi then moved his family from London to a Park Avenue apartment in New York City. He also filed the first papers in declaration of his intent to become an American citizen, among other endeavors.

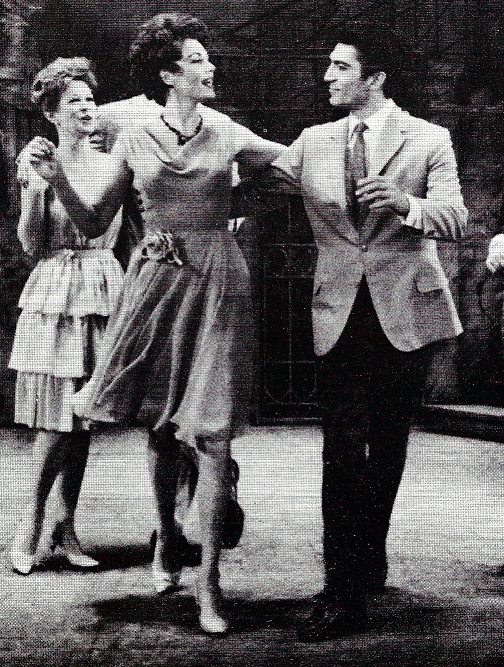
Sergio Franchi and Elizabeth Allen in Do I Hear a Waltz?

Meredith Willson brought Franchi to the attention of Richard Rodgers when he was casting the leading role of the romantic Venetian shopkeeper, Renato Di Rossi, for the musical "Do I Hear a Waltz". Rodgers provided $450,000 towards the financing of the show, and Columbia Records provided $105,640. Advance ticket sales of $900,000 indicated a lengthy run, despite mixed reviews. Franchi liked the score and embraced the idea, although it meant giving up a large portion of a year's income from his concert dates. The Broadway show was the focus of Franchi's endeavors until the musical closed on September 25, 1965. Reviews were generally favorable for his singing. The song "Bargaining" was especially written by Rodgers to showcase Franchi's vocal dexterity and to provide comic relief in the score. The show continued to be popular and Franchi continued success with it.

In 1965, RCA Victor allowed Franchi to appear on the Columbia Records cast album of Do I Hear a Waltz?. His Live! at the Cocoanut Grove album was also released early in the year. He recorded The Songs of Richard Rodgers; and his evergreen Christmas album The Heart of Christmas (Cuor' Di Natale). Franchi's Live! and Christmas albums both peaked on the Billboard 200. Four other previously recorded albums from Europe were also released in 1965, as well two new singles. However, Franchi never had a hit single. There is some anecdotal evidence that Franchi wished to have more influence on musical choices for his singles recordings. Due to perceived injustices and dissatisfaction with RCA Victor, Franchi did not record another single for at least a year.

Over the next several years, Franchi's career continued to grow. Franchi appeared in Las Vegas and many well-known places, and opened for or was opened by many famous celebrities. He also continued to have television appearances and in general, his popularity was very high. He also had performances internationally.

In 1963, Franchi turned down an offer from Metro-Goldwyn-Mayer to star in a film on Mario Lanza's life story. Hedda Hopper quoted him as saying "If I did it well, I'd always be remembered as the man who played Lanza. If I didn't do it well, heaven help me." In 1968, he accepted a non-singing, supportive role in a United Artists film, but soon tired of these types of positions. He stated he preferred performing on Broadway, where each night was different and a challenge to make it new.

After Franchi's Broadway role in Waltz, he continued to be considered for new roles on stage, but he did not return to Broadway for more than a decade. After recording several more albums for RCA Victor, Franchi's contract with the label expired in 1969 and he chose not to renew it. Instead, he signed with United Artists Records, with whom he had worked with briefly before.

As the recording industry increasingly came to be dominated by the tastes of a younger generation, Franchi and many his contemporaries found their most popular reception in supper clubs.

==== 1970s ====
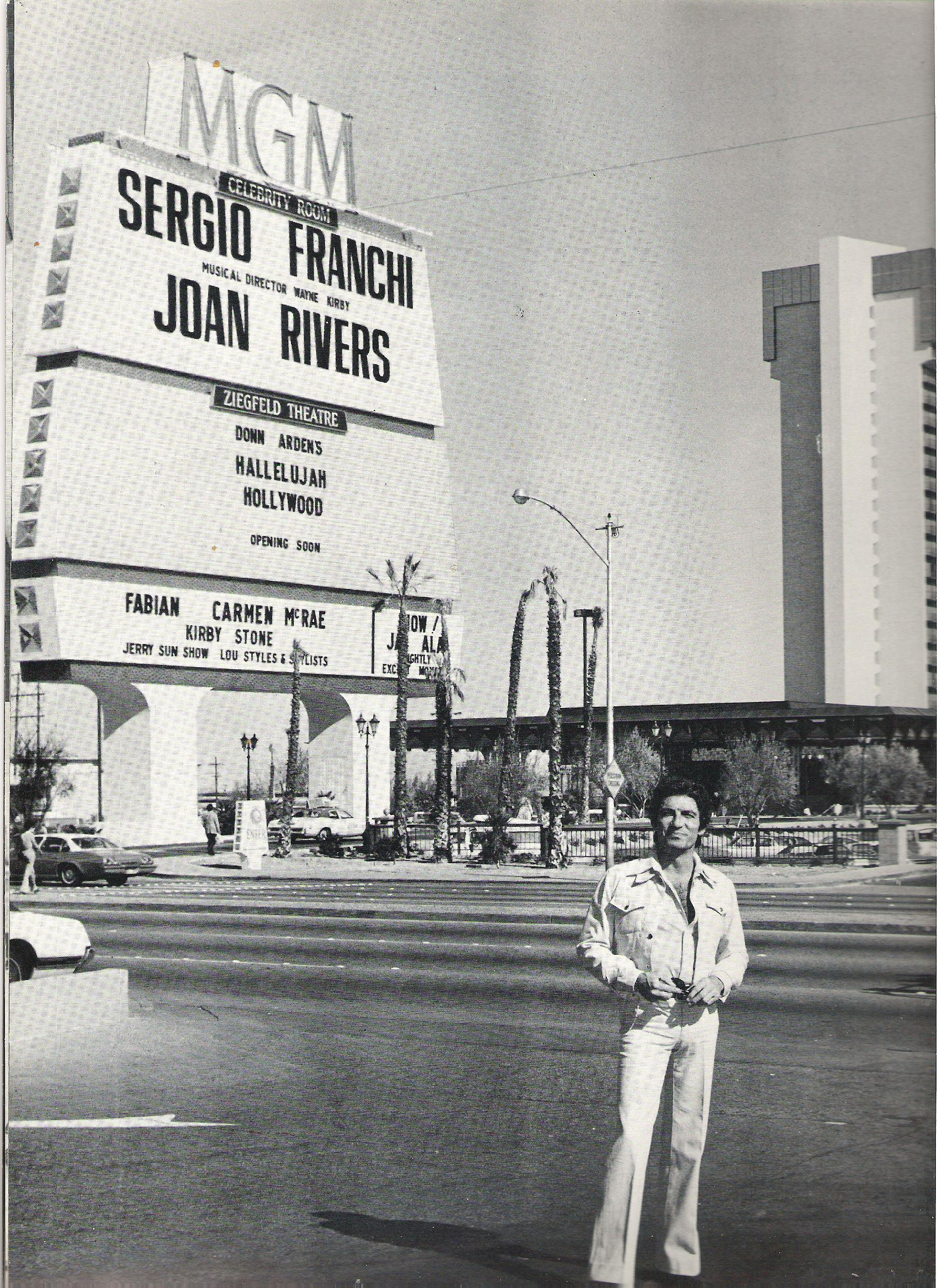
Sergio Franchi with his Billboard at MGM Grand Hotel, 1974

During the 1970s, gambling was not the main attraction in Vegas. With the collapse of the musical comedy genre in movies, and the dominance of the younger generation in the recording industry—Las Vegas became a prime vacation destination for entertainment, and the place to catch live performances of stars., and Franchi was no exception to this. In 1970 Franchi was voted Best Male Vocalist by Fabulous Las Vegas Magazine.. Franchi performed successfully in many other places outside of Las Vegas as well. By 1972, Franchi had become a United States citizen. In general, the late 60s and most of the 70s were a period of great success and wealth for Franchi. He had many performances, concerts, appearances, records produced, and tours, both international and domestic. Some of these became an integral part of his life later on. He also engaged in activities such as advertising campaigns for private companies. In 1975, Franchi was the recipient of The Mario Lanza Award for outstanding achievements in the field of music.

1977 and 1978 were not particularly good years for Franchi because of medical problems, family problems, and several concert cancellations. During this period, Franchi became estranged from his wife Yvonne, and (with their children now grown) he moved back to his Manhattan apartment. Contemplating some slowdown towards a future retirement and wishing to draw his extended family closer, Franchi purchased a 240-acre estate in Stonington in September 1979.

==== 1980s ====
Through the 1980s, Franchi's successes of the past two decades permitted him the opportunity to both work closer to home, and choose the length of his engagements. Despite his age, reviews from this time generally regarded him as being in good physical and vocal form He continued a series of successful concerts, benefits, and tours. He also received the Italian American of the Year Award in New Orleans at this time.

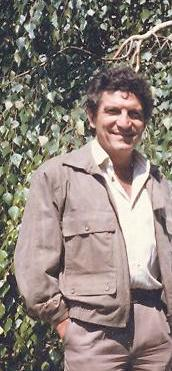
Franchi in 1986.

Beginning on May 9, 1983, he starred in the Tony Award-winning musical Nine and devoted 18 months to it, to generally favorable reviews. Later, in the 1980s, Franchi continued to perform at a number of popular venues in the United States. He intended to retire after his work on Nine, although he continued to appear in Chicago for his large fan-base there in 1985 and 1986, as well as other various places in the United States in 1987 and 1988. His final Atlantic City appearance was in October 1987 at Trump's Castle.

In 1988, RCA re-issued the compilation album This is Sergio Franchi on CD. Also in 1988, he visited the Sanremo Music Festival in Italy. The festival inspired him to produce his own 12-track 1989 album, Encore. which contained the 1988 Festival winner, "Perdere l'amore," and four more songs never before recorded by him.

== Personal life ==
Franchi was always attracted to the arts, and could play multiple instruments, including piano and guitar. Franchi also always carried a sketch book with him on all of his travels, and in later life, devoted himself to watercolor painting in his private studio.

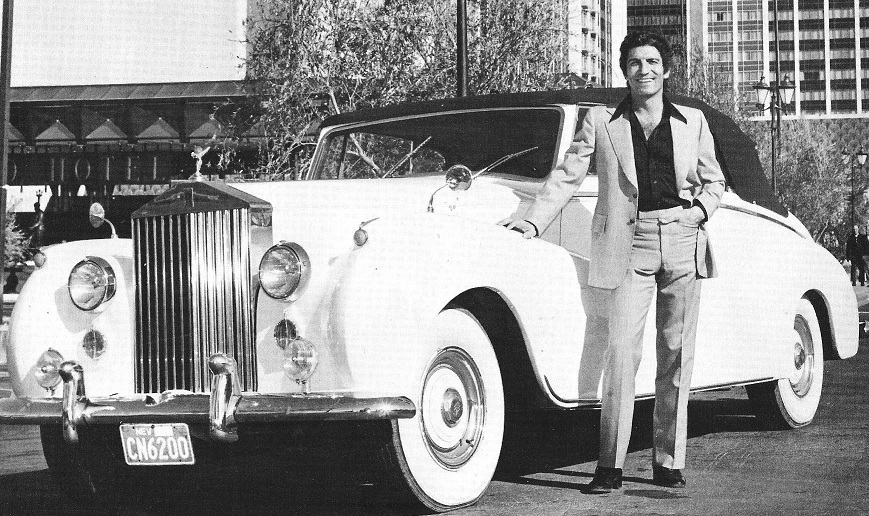
Sergio Franchi's restored 1955 Rolls-Royce

Franchi was also an avid collector and restorer of classic and antique automobiles. His collection included "25 examples of fine British, American, and Italian" cars.

On February 14, 1953, he married Yvonne Lindsey, a South African ballerina of English extraction. They had two children: a daughter, Greta Teresa; and a son, Roberto Danilo. They divorced on December 31, 1981, in Clark County, Nevada. Franchi married his second wife, Eva E. Simon, in New York City on June 14, 1982. Simon had emigrated with her family to America from Budapest (where she studied ballet) following the 1956 Hungarian revolt. It was a second marriage for both.

Franchi and Simon purchased the 240-acre Farmholme property in Stonington, Connecticut in 1979. He intended it to be a refuge for his retirement years. The property included several residences, and Franchi worked to make it a family compound. By 1982, Franchi had relocated his father, stepmother, and sister Mirella and her children to his estate. The dates of his mother's, father's, and stepmother's deaths are unknown. Mirella died 38 days after Franchi.

=== Final illness and death ===
His planned return to China never occurred. His last of more than 130 television appearances was on Live! with Regis & Kathie Lee on July 4, 1989, and Franchi's last concert was at the Warwick Musical Theater on Saturday, July 29, 1989. On August 3, 1989, while rehearsing for a South Shore Music Circus concert the next day (with Pat Cooper), Franchi collapsed, was hospitalized, and the rest of his summer concerts were cancelled. Tests revealed a brain tumor and, despite radiation therapy, Franchi succumbed to the illness. He died less than one month after his 64th birthday.

== Philanthropy and benefit concerts ==
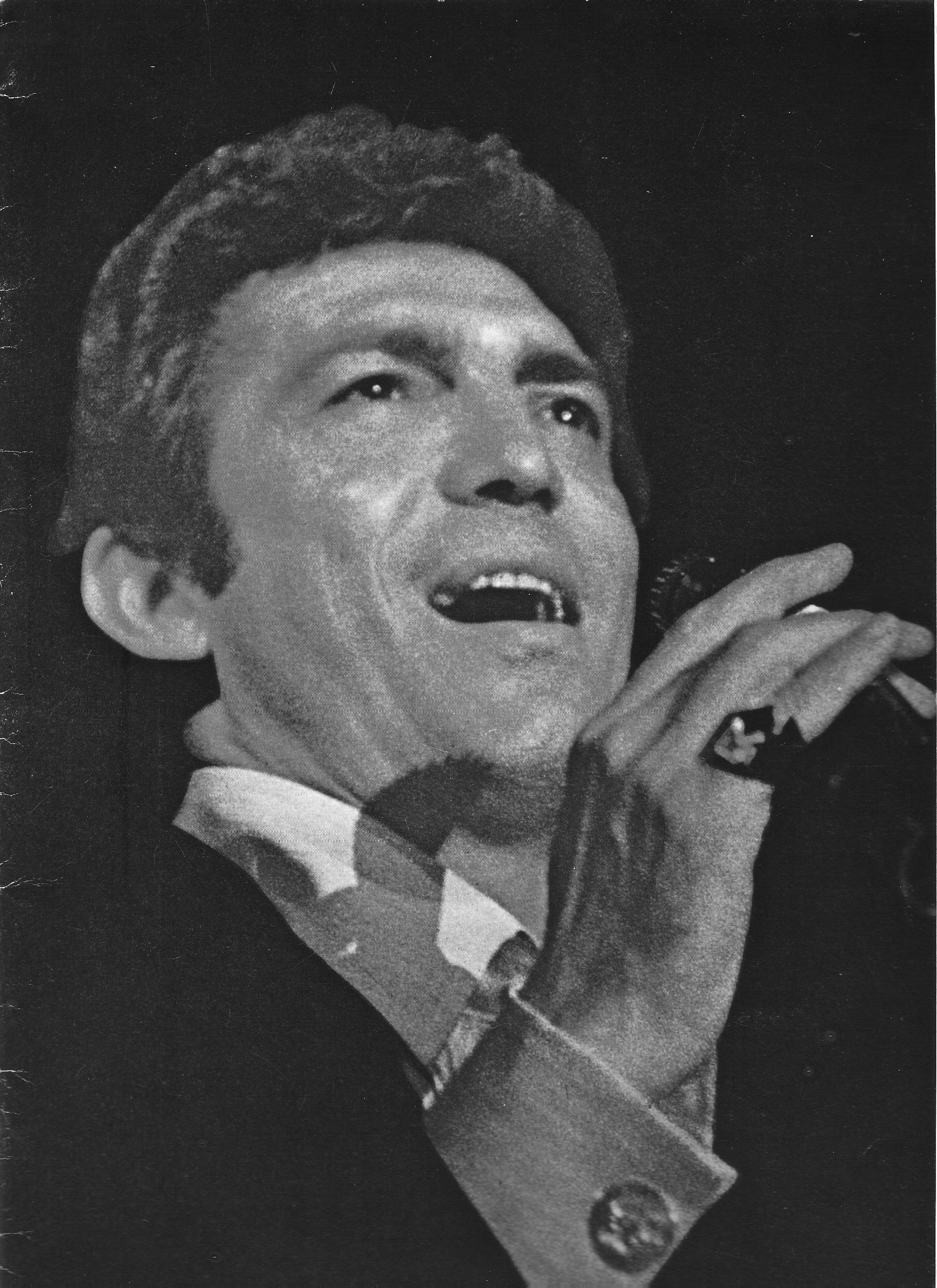
Franchi in a concert.

Early in his American career, Franchi's popularity drew people for major charity and benefit shows. During his dual-billing cabaret show with Barbra Streisand at the Eden Roc Hotel, they were both recruited for the American Cancer Society Benefit (MC, Bob Hope) at the Paramount Theater in Palm Beach, Florida on March 17, 1963. Along with other stars, they performed successfully before a capacity audience.

In 1965, Franchi (with Itzhak Perlman, Richard Tucker and Vivienne della Chiesa) performed at Madison Square Garden—raising $150,000 for the annual "Music Under the Stars" benefiting the American-Israeli Cultural Foundation. Later that year Franchi joined MC Jack Benny and other stars for a United Nations Delegates Concert on September 10.

In 1967, New York City's WNET held their annual fundraising. Franchi joined Itzhak Perlman, Shirley Verrett and Buffy Sainte-Marie in the event hosted by Tony Randall. Some notable benefits at which Franchi performed during the 1970s include Milwaukee's "Fight for Sight" benefit hosted by Bob Hope at Philharmonic Hall (1971), and a star-filled Easter Seals telethon from Las Vegas at the large Sahara Hotel convention hall in 1972, where Franchi performed and made a donation On June 3, 1984, Franchi was a featured performer at the "7th Annual Lions Sight & Hearing Telethon" on New Orleans' WGNO-TV.

One of Franchi's largest fund-raising benefit was a political event in 1982, where he helped raise over $600,000 during a three-day concert tour of Massachusetts on behalf of the re-election campaign of Governor King. In later life, Franchi donated prints of some of his watercolors for charitable sales. Franchi was a longtime supporter of the Muscular Dystrophy Association and performed frequently on the annual Jerry Lewis MDA Telethon. When in 1988 he was asked about his upcoming performance at Ninigret Park to benefit the Rhode Island chapter of the MDA, Franchi stated: "When you've been as fortunate as I have, you have to do something for other people." Franchi cancelled a paid performance to assist the charity, and the show was expected to net over $100,000 for the MDA.

Franchi was proud of both his American citizenship and his Italian heritage. He became active very early with the National Italian American Foundation (NIAF), and regularly performed in benefit of the Boys' Towns of Italy and the Girls' Towns of Italy. While visiting back in Italy, he was recruited to perform what was possibly his first Boys' Towns Benefit Concert at the Fairmont Hotel in San Francisco, on May 4, 1963, of which many more followed. Franchi's support for these children's organizations also included a 1967 sold-out concert at Carnegie Hall.

As part of the 1970 celebrations of the Silver Jubilee of Boys' Towns of Italy, Franchi performed in benefits at New York's Philharmonic Hall, and at New Orleans' Municipal Auditorium. Franchi performed in New Orleans for a Boys' Towns Benefit with Dana Valery in 1974. In 1975 he held a benefit concert at the Performing Arts Center in Milwaukee for the Boys' Towns of Italy. In Pittsburgh, Franchi performed benefits in 1975 and 1977 at Heinz Hall in support of Boys' Towns. More boys Benefit Performances occurred in New Orleans in November 1977, occurred. along with a performance in New York on March 17, 1980. Many of the children's benefits throughout his career were in local concert halls.)

=== Awards ===
The Greater New Orleans Cultural Society honored Franchi with a special banquet (held March 12, 1982) and presented him with the 16th Annual Italian American of the Year Award. Franchi also received the Il Leone di San Marco Award in the Performing Arts (1984) from The Italian Heritage and Culture Committee of the Bronx and Westchester in New York. The Boys' Towns of Italy presented Franchi with their prestigious Michelangelo Award, and in 2001 he was posthumously awarded the title of cavaliere in the Order of Merit (Stella al merito del lavoro) by the Italian Government.

== Presidential performances ==
- Franchi was invited to attend a rally for President John F. Kennedy to sing the national anthem in 1963. Several years later Franchi revealed that he had to buy a record to learn the lyrics, and that he was completely surprised when President Kennedy asked him "Well, do you know the words?" before his performance.
- In May 1965, Franchi went to Washington, D.C., to sing at a large Congressional Club luncheon honoring Lady Bird Johnson.
- At President Ronald Reagan's invitation, Franchi sang a performance at the White House Rose Garden for the State Visit of Portugal on September 15, 1983.

== See also ==
- List of Operatic pop artists
- RCA Red Seal Records
- List of RCA Records artists
- List of Italian-American actors
- List of Italian-American entertainers
- List of songs recorded by Sergio Franchi
- List of notable brain tumor patients
