= Il Volo discography =

- Studio albums: 8
- Extended plays: 2
- Live albums: 4
- Compilation albums: 2
- Singles: 12
- Music videos: 4
- Other charted songs: 9

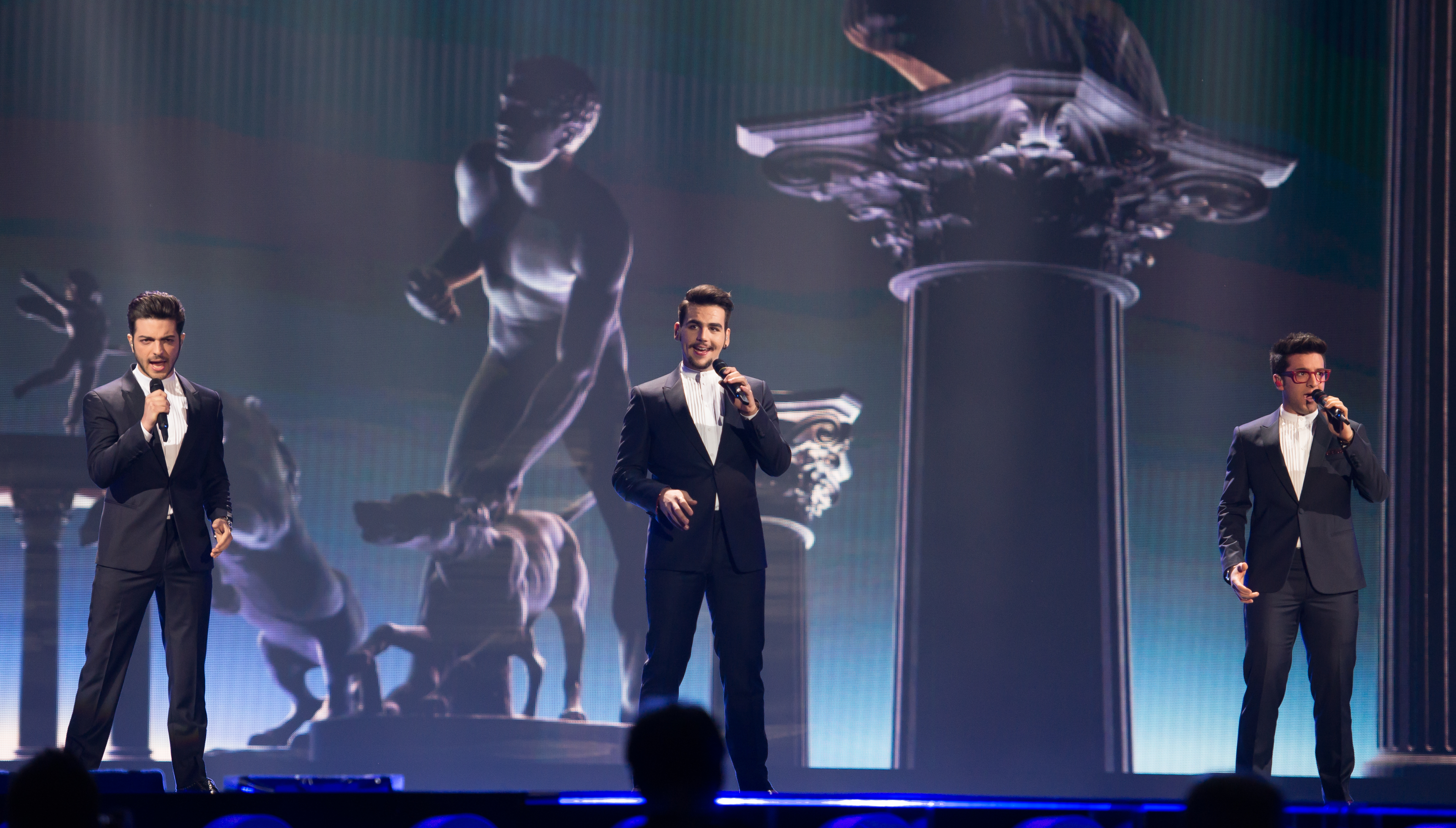

This article is the discography of Italian popera trio Il Volo and includes all the studio albums, live albums, EPs, and singles, as well as the peak chart positions for Italy, Argentina, Austria, Belgium (Wallonia), France, Germany, Mexico, Netherlands, New Zealand, Switzerland and United States (Billboard 200, Classical Albums, Top Latin Albums and Latin Pop Albums for the albums and Classical Digital Songs and World Digital Songs for the singles). Furthermore, there are certifications from FIMI, CAPIF, IFPI Austria, SNEP, AMPROFON, RMNZ and the RIAA.

== Albums ==
=== Studio albums ===
==== Original versions ====
List of studio albums, with selected chart positions, sales figures and certifications
Title	Details	Peak chart positions										Sales	Certifications
Title	Details	ITA	AUT	BEL (Wa)	FRA	GER	NL	NZ	SWI	US	US Class	Sales	Certifications
Il Volo	Released: 30 November 2010; Label: Geffen; Formats: CD, music download	6	1	3	10	8	7	2	46	10	1	US: 229,000	FIMI: Platinum; IFPI AUT: Gold; RMNZ: Gold; SNEP: Gold
We Are Love	Released: 19 November 2012; Label: Geffen; Formats: CD, music download	46	—	136	189	—	57	—	—	100	2		
Buon Natale: The Christmas Album	Released: 22 October 2013; Label: Geffen; Formats: CD, music download	20	—	162	—	—	—	—	97	39	1		FIMI: Gold
L'amore si muove	Released: 25 September 2015; Label: Sony Music Latin; Formats: CD, music download	1	—	127	—	—	—	—	—	—	14		FIMI: 2× Platinum
Ámame^{[A]}	Released: 30 November 2018; Label: Sony Music Latin; Formats: CD, music download	—	—	—	—	—	—	—	—	—	—		
Musica	Released: 22 February 2019; Label: Sony Masterworks; Formats: CD, music download	2	—	—	—	—	—	—	22	—	6		FIMI: Gold
Il Volo Sings Morricone	Released: 5 November 2021; Label: Sony Masterworks; Formats: CD, music download, streaming	9	—	91	—	—	—	—	53	—	—		
Ad Astra	Released: 29 March 2024; Label: Sony Masterworks; Formats: CD, music download, streaming	5	—	84	—	—	—	—	32	—	—		
Our Christmas	Released: 8 November 2026; Label: Sony; Formats: CD, music download, streaming	83	73	88	—	—	—	—	—	—	—		
"—" denotes a recording that did not chart or was not released in that territory.

==== Re-issues charted separately ====
List of re-issues, with selected chart positions
Title	Details	Peak chart positions				
Title	Details	AUT	BEL (Wa)	SWI	US	US Class
We Are Love (Special Edition)	Release date: May 28, 2013; Label: Geffen; Formats: CD, music download	—	—	—	111	2
Grande amore (International Version)	Released: September 25, 2015; Label: Sony Music Latin; Formats: CD, music download	42	19	10	188	1
"—" denotes a recording that did not chart or was not released in that territory.

==== Spanish versions ====
List of studio albums, with selected chart positions, sales figures and certifications
Title	Details	Peak chart positions						Sales	Certifications
Title	Details	ARG	MEX	US	US Class	US Latin	US Latin Pop	Sales	Certifications
Il Volo	Released: June 7, 2011; Label: Geffen; Formats: CD, music download	—	6	—	3	4	1	MEX: 60,000; US: 64,000	AMPROFON: Platinum; RIAA: Gold (Latin)
Más Que Amor	Released: April 2013; Label: Geffen; Formats: CD, music download	9	7	112	3	2	1	MEX: 30,000; ARG: 20,000	AMPROFON: Gold; CAPIF: Gold^{[B]}
Grande amore	Released: September 25, 2015; Label: Sony Music Latin; Formats: CD, music download	14	—	—	5	2	1		ZPAV: 1× Platinum
"—" denotes a recording that did not chart or was not released in that territory.

=== Live albums ===
List of live albums, with selected chart positions, sales figures and certifications
Title	Details	Peak chart positions								Sales	Certifications
Title	Details	ITA	AUT	BEL (Wa)	MEX	SWI	UK Class	US	US Class	Sales	Certifications
Il Volo... Takes Flight: Live from the Detroit Opera House	Release date: February 28, 2012; Label: Geffen; Formats: CD/DVD, music download	37	—	95	31	—	—	85	1	MEX: 30,000; US: 46,000	AMPROFON: Gold
We Are Love: Live from The Fillmore Miami Beach at Jackie Gleason Theater	Release date: August 6, 2013; Label: Geffen; Formats: CD/DVD, music download	—	—	—	—	—	—	—	12		
Live A Pompei	Release date: November 27, 2015; Label: Sony Music Latin; Formats: CD/DVD, music download	26	—	—	—	—	—	—	—		
Notte Magica - A Tribute to the Three Tenors	Released: September 30, 2016; Label: Sony Masterworks; Formats: CD/DVD, music download	2	33	74	9	33	16	186	1	ITA: 50,000	FIMI: Platinum
"—" denotes a recording that did not chart or was not released in that territory.

=== Compilation albums ===
List of compilation albums, with selected chart positions
Title	Details	Peak chart positions				Sales	Certifications
Title	Details	ITA	BEL (Wa)	SWI	US Class	Sales	Certifications
The Platinum Collection	Release date: February 12, 2015; Label: Universal; Formats: CD, music download	13	—	—	—	ITA: 25,000	FIMI: Gold
10 Years: The Best Of	Release date: November 8, 2019; Label: Sony; Formats: CD, music download, streaming	3	128	76	5	ITA: 25,000	FIMI: Gold

== Extended plays ==
List of extended plays, with selected chart positions, sales figures and certifications
Title	Details	Peak chart positions						Sales	Certifications
Title	Details	ITA	AUT	BEL (Wa)	NL	SWI	US Class	Sales	Certifications
Christmas Favorites	Release date: November 21, 2011; Label: Geffen; Formats: Music download	—	—	—	—	—	9	US: 10,000	
Sanremo grande amore	Release date: February 17, 2015; Label: Columbia; Formats: CD, Music download	1	9	59	63	15	7	ITA: 150,000	FIMI: 3× Platinum
4 Xmas	Release date: November 3, 2023; Label: Sony; Formats: Music download	—	—	—	—	—	—		
"—" denotes a recording that did not chart or was not released in that territory.

== Singles ==
=== Italian-language singles ===
List of singles, with selected chart positions and certifications
Title	Year	Peak chart positions								Certifications	Album
Title	Year	ITA	AUT	BEL (Wa)	FRA	GER	SWI	US Class	US World	Certifications	Album
"'O Sole Mio"	2011	—	55	—	—	—	—	1	2		Il Volo
"Grande amore"	2015	1	5	42	145	54	19	6	—	FIMI: 2× Platinum	Sanremo grande amore
"Ancora"	2015	65	—	—	—	—	—	—	—		Sanremo grande amore
"Canzone per te"	2015	—	—	—	—	—	—	—	—		Sanremo grande amore
"L'amore si muove"	2015	59	—	—	—	—	—	—	—		L'amore si muove
"Per te ci sarò"	2015	—	—	—	—	—	—	—	—		L'amore si muove
"Tornerà l'amore"	2016	—	—	—	—	—	—	—	—		L'amore si muove
"Musica che resta"	2019	16	—	—	—	—	—	—	—		Musica
" A chi mi dice"	2019	—	—	—	—	—	—	—	—		Musica
"Capolavoro"	2024	23	—	—	—	—	—	—	—	FIMI: Gold	Ad Astra
"—" denotes a recording that did not chart or was not released in that territory.

=== Spanish-language singles ===
List of singles, with selected chart positions and certifications
Title	Year	Peak chart positions			Album
Title	Year	US Class	US Latin Pop	US Tropical	Album
"Hasta El Final"	2011	—	—	—	Il Volo (Edición en Español)
"Constantemente Mía" (with Belinda)	2013	—	—	—	Más Que Amor
"El Triste"	2013	10	—	—	Más Que Amor (Edición Deluxe)
"Si Me Falta Tu Mirada"	2015	—	—	—	Grande Amore
"Noche Sin Día" (with Gente De Zona)	2018	—	32	4	Ámame
"—" denotes a recording that did not chart or was not released in that territory.

=== English-language singles ===
List of singles
Title	Year	Album
"My Dream" (with Olivia Newton-John and Jim Brickman)	2024	Non-album single

== Other charted songs ==
List of songs, with selected chart positions
Title	Year	Peak chart positions		Album
Title	Year	US Class	US World	Album
"El Reloj"	2011	25	17	Il Volo (Edición en Español)
"Il Mondo"	2011	5	3	Il Volo
"Notte Stellata (The Swan)"	2011	5	24	Il Volo
"Smile"	2011	4	—	Il Volo
"This Time"	2011	13	—	Il Volo
"Un Amore Così Grande"	2011	15	5	Il Volo
"Angel"	2013	16	—	We Are Love (Special Edition)
"Can You Feel the Love Tonight"	2013	8	—	We Are Love (Special Edition)
"O Holy Night"	2013	18	—	Buon Natale: The Christmas Album
"—" denotes a recording that did not chart or was not released in that territory.

== Other appearances ==
List of other album appearances
Title	Year	Album
"We Are the World 25 for Haiti" (Artists for Haiti)	2010	Charity Single
"Così / Así" (Eros Ramazzotti featuring Il Volo)	2012	Noi / Somos
"Pierre" (Pooh featuring Il Volo)	2013	Pooh box - Live Treviso & Voci per Valerio
"El Reloj" (Lucho Gatica featuring Il Volo)	2013	Historia de un Amor
"Smile" (Barbra Streisand featuring Il Volo)	2013	Back to Brooklyn
"Make Our Garden Grow" (Barbra Streisand featuring Il Volo, Chris Botti and Jason Gould)	2013	Back to Brooklyn
"Más Allá / Al di La" (Ricardo Montaner featuring Il Volo)	2014	Agradecido
"It's Now or Never" (Elvis Presley featuring Il Volo)	2015	If I Can Dream
"The Little Drummer Boy" (Jackie Evancho featuring Il Volo)	2016	Someday at Christmas
"Et queda tant per viure"	2016	El disc de La Marató 2016
"Inmenso" (José Luis Rodríguez featuring Il Volo)	2017	Inmenso
"Penumbras" (Sandro featuring Il Volo)	2018	Sandro Dúos
"D'Artagnan e i moschettieri del re" (Cristina D'Avena featuring Il Volo)	2018	Duets Forever

== Music videos ==
Title	Album details	Peak chart positions	
Title	Album details	ITA DVD	US Video
Il Volo... Takes Flight: Live from the Detroit Opera House	Release date: February 28, 2012; Label: Geffen; Formats: DVD	*	*
We Are Love: Live from The Fillmore Miami Beach at Jackie Gleason Theater	Release date: August 6, 2013; Label: Geffen; Formats: DVD	*	*
Buon Natale: Live from The Fillmore Miami Beach at Jackie Gleason Theater	Release date: November 19, 2013; Label: Geffen; Formats: DVD	*	*
Live from Pompeii	Release date: September 18, 2015; Label: Sony Music Latin; Formats: DVD	1	1
Notte Magica - A Tribute to the Three Tenors	Release date: November 4, 2016; Label: Sony Masterworks; Formats: DVD	—N/a	10
"*" denotes a recording with unknown peak

== Notes ==
- A Ámame was released only in United States and Latin America. It peaked at no. 12 on Latin Album Sales in USA.
- B The CAPIF certification for Más Que Amor also includes the sales of the original version, We Are Love.
