= The Platinum Collection (Il Volo album) =

Box set by Il Volo
- Released: 12 February 2015
- Genres: Pop; pop-opera
- Languages: Italian, English, Spanish
- Label: Universal Music Group

Il Volo chronology
Buon Natale: The Christmas Album (2013)	The Platinum Collection (2015)	Sanremo grande amore (2015)

The Platinum Collection is the first compilation by Italian operatic pop trio Il Volo, released in Italy in February 2015 following their appearance at the 65th Sanremo Music Festival, in which their song "Grande amore" received first prize in the "Big Artists" category and will represent Italy in 2015 Eurovision Song Contest. The album debuted and peaked at No.13.

It contains three previously released albums, Il Volo (2010), We Are Love (2012) and Il Volo Takes Flight - Live from the Detroit Opera House (2012).

== Track listing ==
Disc 1

Italian Version - CD & digital download
No.	Title	Writer(s)	Length
1.	"Il mondo"	Gianni Meccia, Jimmy Fontana, Carlo Pes, Italo Greco	4:21
2.	"E più ti penso"	Ennio Morricone, Tony Renis, Mogol	4:47
3.	"È la mia vita"	Pino Marino, Maurizio Fabrizio	4:09
4.	"'O sole mio"	Giovanni Capurro, Eduardo Di Capua, Alfredo Mazzucchi	3:36
5.	"El reloj"	Roberto Cantoral	4:09
6.	"Smile"	Charlie Chaplin, John Turner, John Turner	4:47
7.	"Notte stellata (The Swan)"	Tony Renis, Camille Saint-Saëns	3:50
8.	"La luna hizo esto"	Mark Portman, Diane Warren, Edgar Cortázar	3:28
9.	"Per te"	Marco Marinangeli, Josh Groban, Walter Afanasieff	5:03
10.	"Un amore così grande"	Antonella Maggio, Guido Ferilli	4:22
11.	"Painfully Beautiful"	Diane Warren	3:45
12.	"This Time"	Kevin Griffin, Mike Busbee, Michelle Robin Lewis	3:06

Disc 2

No.	Title	Writer(s)	Length
1.	"Questo amore"	Diane Warren, Marco Marinangeli	4:34
2.	"L'ultima volta"	Max Calo, Raffaele Di Pietro	3:33
3.	"I Bring You to My Senses"	Diane Warren	4:04
4.	"Beautiful Day"	Adam Clayton, David Howell Evans, Paul David Hewson, Larry Mullen Jr.	3:16
5.	"Splendida"	Jörgen Elofsson, Marco Marinangeli, William Ross	4:19
6.	"Historia de un amor"	Carlos Eleta Almarán	3:54
7.	"Luna nascosta" (Love Theme from the Movie Hidden Moon)	Luis Bacalov, Humberto Gatica, Massimo Guantini, Tony Renis
8.	"Il canto" (feat. Plácido Domingo)	Luca Barbarossa, Romano Musumarra	4:28
9.	"We Are Love"	Edgar Cortázar, Mark Portmann	4:30
10.	"Così" (feat. Eros Ramazzotti)	Luca Chiaravalli, Eros Ramazzotti	4:15
11.	"Bienvenido nuestro amor"	Edgar Cortázar, Mark Portmann	3:42
12.	"Non farmi aspettare"	Emiliano Cecere, Saverio Grandi	4:03
Total length:			48:17

Disc 3

No.	Title	Writer(s)	Length
1.	"Il Mondo"	Gianni Meccia, Jimmy Fontana, Carlo Pes, Italo Greco	4:09
2.	"Un Amore Cosi' Grande"	Guido Maria Ferilli / Antonella Maggio	3:20
3.	"Ti Voglio Tanto Bene"	Ernesto De Curtis	2:44
4.	"Granada"	Agustín Lara	3:59
5.	"E Piu’ Ti Penso"	Ennio Morricone, Tony Renis, Mogol	4:54
6.	"'O sole mio"	Giovanni Capurro, Eduardo Di Capua, Alfredo Mazzucchi	3:41
7.	"Non ti scordar di me"	Ernesto Curtis / Domenico Furno	3:27
8.	"This Time"	Michael Busbee / K. Griffin / M. Lewis	3:10
9.	"Smile"	Charlie Chaplin, John Turner, John Turner	4:51
10.	"Mattinata"	Ruggero Leoncavallo	2:43
11.	"Music Proibita"	Stanislao Gastaldon	3:26
12.	"Mamma"	Cesare Andrea Bixio	3:40
13.	"La Luna Hizo Esto (feat. Pia Toscano) "	Edgar Cortázar / Mark Portman / Diane Warren	3:34
14.	"Notte Stellata [The Swan]"	Tony Renis / Camille Saint-Saëns	3:54
15.	"Funiculì, Funiculà"	Luigi Denza	3:26
Total length:			48:17

== Charts ==
Chart (2015)	Peak position
Italian Albums Chart	13

== Certifications ==
Region	Certification	Certified units/sales
Italy (FIMI)	Gold	25,000^{*}
^{*} Sales figures based on certification alone.
