= List of number-one hits of 2015 (Italy) =

This is a list of the number-one hits of 2015 on FIMI's Italian Singles and Albums Charts.

Week	Issue date	Song	Artist	Ref.	Album	Artist	Ref.
1	5 January	"Take Me to Church"	Hozier		TZN – The Best of Tiziano Ferro	Tiziano Ferro	
2	12 January	"Take Me to Church"	Hozier		TZN – The Best of Tiziano Ferro	Tiziano Ferro	
3	19 January	"Take Me to Church"	Hozier		Parole in circolo	Marco Mengoni	
4	26 January	"Take Me to Church"	Hozier		Parole in circolo	Marco Mengoni	
5	2 February	"Take Me to Church"	Hozier		Il bello d'essere brutti	J-Ax	
6	9 February	"Take Me to Church"	Hozier		Il bello d'essere brutti	J-Ax	
7	16 February	"Grande amore"	Il Volo		TZN – The Best of Tiziano Ferro	Tiziano Ferro	
8	23 February	"Grande amore"	Il Volo		Sanremo grande amore	Il Volo	
9	2 March	"Love Me Like You Do"	Ellie Goulding		Lorenzo 2015 CC.	Jovanotti	
10	9 March	"Love Me Like You Do"	Ellie Goulding		Lorenzo 2015 CC.	Jovanotti	
11	16 March	"Love Me Like You Do"	Ellie Goulding		Rebel Heart	Madonna	
12	23 March	"Love Me Like You Do"	Ellie Goulding		Lorenzo 2015 CC.	Jovanotti	
13	30 March	"Love Me Like You Do"	Ellie Goulding		9	Negrita	
14	6 April	"Love Me Like You Do"	Ellie Goulding		1995	Lorenzo Fragola	
15	13 April	"See You Again"	Wiz Khalifa featuring Charlie Puth		1995	Lorenzo Fragola	
16	20 April	"See You Again"	Wiz Khalifa featuring Charlie Puth		Gira del mondo	Ligabue	
17	27 April	"See You Again"	Wiz Khalifa featuring Charlie Puth		Gira del mondo	Ligabue	
18	4 May	"See You Again"	Wiz Khalifa featuring Charlie Puth		Miracolo!	Clementino	
19	11 May	"See You Again"	Wiz Khalifa featuring Charlie Puth		Beyond	Mario Biondi	
20	18 May	"See You Again"	Wiz Khalifa featuring Charlie Puth		Perfetto	Eros Ramazzotti	
21	25 May	"El mismo sol"	Álvaro Soler		Out	The Kolors	
22	1 June	"El mismo sol"	Álvaro Soler		Out	The Kolors	
23	8 June	"El mismo sol"	Álvaro Soler		Out	The Kolors	
24	15 June	"El mismo sol"	Álvaro Soler		Out	The Kolors	
25	22 June	"El Perdón"	Nicky Jam & Enrique Iglesias		Out	The Kolors	
26	29 June	"El Perdón"	Nicky Jam & Enrique Iglesias		Vero	Gue Pequeno	
27	6 July	"El Perdón"	Nicky Jam & Enrique Iglesias		Out	The Kolors	
28	17 July	"El Perdón"	Nicky Jam & Enrique Iglesias		Out	The Kolors	
29	24 July	"El Perdón"	Nicky Jam & Enrique Iglesias		Out	The Kolors	
30	31 July	"El Perdón"	Nicky Jam & Enrique Iglesias		Out	The Kolors	
31	7 August	"Roma-Bangkok"	Baby K featuring Giusy Ferreri		Out	The Kolors	
32	14 August	"Roma-Bangkok"	Baby K featuring Giusy Ferreri		Out	The Kolors	
33	21 August	"Roma-Bangkok"	Baby K featuring Giusy Ferreri		Out	The Kolors	
34	28 August	"Roma-Bangkok"	Baby K featuring Giusy Ferreri		Lorenzo 2015 CC.	Jovanotti	
35	4 September	"Roma-Bangkok"	Baby K featuring Giusy Ferreri		Endkadenz Vol. 2	Verdena	
36	11 September	"Roma-Bangkok"	Baby K featuring Giusy Ferreri		The Book of Souls	Iron Maiden	
37	18 September	"Roma-Bangkok"	Baby K featuring Giusy Ferreri		Doppelganger	Madman	
38	25 September	"Roma-Bangkok"	Baby K featuring Giusy Ferreri		Rattle That Lock	David Gilmour	
39	2 October	"Roma-Bangkok"	Baby K featuring Giusy Ferreri		La rivoluzione sta arrivando	Negramaro	
40	9 October	"Roma-Bangkok"	Baby K featuring Giusy Ferreri		L'amore si muove	Il Volo	
41	16 October	"Roma-Bangkok"	Baby K featuring Giusy Ferreri		Pop-Hoolista	Fedez	
42	23 October	"Ti ho voluto bene veramente"	Marco Mengoni		20:05	Benji & Fede	
43	30 October	"Hello"	Adele		Sounds Good Feels Good	5 Seconds of Summer	
44	6 November	"Hello"	Adele		De Gregori canta Bob Dylan - Amore e furto	Francesco De Gregori	
45	13 November	"Hello"	Adele		Simili	Laura Pausini	
46	20 November	"Hello"	Adele		Made in the A.M.	One Direction	
47	27 November	"Hello"	Adele		25	Adele	
48	4 December	"Hello"	Adele		Passione maledetta	Modà	
49	11 December	"Runaway"	Urban Strangers		Le cose che non ho	Marco Mengoni	
50	18 December	"Hello"	Adele		25	Adele	
51	27 December	"Hello"	Adele		25	Adele	
52	1 January 2016	"Est-ce que tu m'aimes?"	Maître Gims		25	Adele	

== See also ==
- 2015 in music
- List of number-one hits in Italy
