= List of Billboard Latin Pop Albums number ones from the 2010s =

Latin Pop Albums is a record chart published in Billboard magazine that features Latin music sales information in regards to Latin pop music. The data is compiled by Nielsen SoundScan from a sample that includes music stores, music departments at electronics and department stores, Internet sales (both physical and digital) and verifiable sales from concert venues in the United States. Currently, Shakira holds the record of longest run topping the chart with her 2017 album El Dorado, 63 weeks in total so far (as of September 25, 2018).

== Number-one albums ==
Key

† – Best-selling Latin pop album of the year

Artist	Album	Reached number one	Weeks at number one
Andrea Bocelli	Mi Navidad	9 January 2010	1
Alejandro Fernández	Dos Mundos: Evolución	16 January 2010	1
Jencarlos Canela	Buscame	23 January 2010	5
Camila	Dejarte de Amar	27 February 2010	2
Chayanne	No Hay Imposibles	13 March 2010	7
Camila	Dejarte de Amar	1 May 2010	6
Marc Anthony	Iconos	12 June 2010	6
Enrique Iglesias	Euphoria	24 July 2010	7
Ricardo Arjona	Poquita Ropa	11 September 2010	1
Enrique Iglesias	Euphoria	9 October 2010	2
Luis Miguel	Luis Miguel	2 October 2010	1
Enrique Iglesias	Euphoria †(2010)	9 October 2010	3
Marco Antonio Solís	En Total Plenitud	30 October 2010	1
Shakira	Sale el Sol	6 November 2010	12
Cristian Castro	Viva el príncipe †(2011)	29 January 2011	3
Ricky Martin	Música + Alma + Sexo	19 February 2011	2
Cristian Castro	Viva el príncipe †(2011)	5 March 2011	5
Gloria Trevi	Gloria	9 April 2011	1
Cristian Castro	Viva el príncipe †(2011)	16 April 2011	2
Maná	Drama y Luz	30 April 2011	7
Franco De Vita	En Primera Fila	18 June 2011	1
Maná	Drama y Luz	25 June 2011	2
Jencarlos Canela	Un Nuevo Dia	9 July 2011	1
Luis Fonsi	Tierra Firme	16 July 2011	4
Maná	Drama y Luz	13 August 2011	1
Enrique Iglesias	Euphoria	20 August 2011	6
Il Volo	Il Volo (Spanish Edition)	24 September 2011	4
Ricardo Arjona	Independiente	22 October 2011	2
Chino & Nacho	Supremo	5 November 2011	1
Ricardo Arjona	Independiente	12 November 2011	1
Cristian Castro	Mi Amigo El Príncipe	19 November 2011	3
Jenni Rivera	Joyas Prestadas: Pop	10 December 2011	2
Shakira	En Vivo Desde París	24 December 2011	1
Jenni Rivera	Joyas Prestadas: Pop	31 December 2011	1
Cristian Castro	Mi Amigo El Príncipe	7 January 2012	1
Christian Pagán	De Miles a Uno	14 January 2012	1
Cristian Castro	Mi Amigo El Príncipe	21 January 2012	1
Il Volo	Il Volo (Spanish Edition)	28 January 2012	1
Cristian Castro	Mi Amigo El Príncipe	4 February 2012	1
Ricardo Arjona	Independiente †(2012)	11 February 2012	3
Maná	Drama y Luz	3 March 2012	1
Ricardo Arjona	Independiente †(2012)	10 March 2012	5
Ednita Nazario	Desnuda	14 April 2012	1
Selena	Enamorada de Ti	21 April 2012	2
Antonio Orozco	D1ez	5 May 2012	1
Maná	Drama y Luz	12 May 2012	1
Ednita Nazario	Desnuda	19 May 2012	2
Ricardo Arjona	Independiente †(2012)	2 June 2012	1
Juanes	MTV Unplugged	16 June 2012	3
Various artists	Café con Musica	7 July 2012	1
Marco Antonio Solís	Una Noche de Luna	14 July 2012	5
Kany Garcia	Kany Garcia	18 August 2012	1
Marco Antonio Solís	Una Noche de Luna	14 July 2012	1
Juanes	MTV Unplugged	1 September 2012	1
Shakira	Sale el Sol	8 September 2012	1
Maná	Exiliados en la Bahía: Lo Mejor de Maná	15 September 2012	4
Alejandro Sanz	La Música No Se Toca	13 October 2012	1
Tommy Torres	12 Historias	20 October 2012	1
Alejandro Sanz	La Música No Se Toca	27 October 2012	3
Maná	Exiliados en la Bahía: Lo Mejor de Maná	24 November 2012	1
Yolandita Monge	Más Para Dar	1 December 2012	1
Thalía	Habítame Siempre	8 December 2012	2
Various artists	Hecho Con Sabor A Puerto Rico	22 December 2012	1
Jenni Rivera	Joyas Prestadas: Pop	29 December 2012	7
Andrea Bocelli	Pasión	23 February 2013	3
Jenni Rivera	Joyas Prestadas: Pop †(2013)	9 March 2013	4
Draco Rosa	Vida	6 April 2013	2
Jenni Rivera	Joyas Prestadas: Pop †(2013)	20 April 2013	1
Il Volo	Más Que Amor	27 April 2013	1
Jenni Rivera	Joyas Prestadas: Pop †(2013)	4 May 2013	1
Carlos Vives	Corazón Profundo	11 May 2013	2
Il Volo	Más Que Amor	25 May 2013	1
Jenni Rivera	Joyas Prestadas: Pop †(2013)	1 June 2013	1
Carlos Vives	Corazón Profundo	8 June 2013	2
Il Volo	Más Que Amor	22 June 2013	3
Natalie Cole	Natalie Cole en Español	13 July 2013	9
Alejandro Fernández	Confidencias	14 September 2013	7
Ricardo Arjona	Metamorfosis: En Vivo Arjona	2 November 2013	7
Marco Antonio Solís	Gracias Por Estar Aqui	9 November 2013	6
Various artists	Musica En Tiempos	21 December 2013	1
Marco Antonio Solís	Gracias Por Estar Aqui	28 December 2013	6
Alejandra Guzmán	La Guzmán: Primera Fila	8 February 2014	2
Manny Manuel	Serenata, Vol. 2	22 February 2014	2
Marco Antonio Solís	Gracias Por Estar Aqui	8 March 2014	3
Juanes	Loco de Amor	29 March 2014	1
Enrique Iglesias	Sex and Love †(2014)	5 April 2014	6
Ricardo Arjona	Viaje	17 May 2014	1
Santana	Corazón	24 May 2014	7
Enrique Iglesias	Sex and Love †(2014)	12 June 2014	9
Chayanne	En Todo Estaré	20 September 2014	10
Pablo Alborán	Terral	29 November 2014	1
Thalía	Amore Mio	6 December 2014	1
Enrique Iglesias	Sex and Love †(2014)	13 December 2014	2
Alejandro Fernández	Confidencias Reales	27 December 2014	2
Enrique Iglesias	Sex and Love †(2014)	10 January 2015	4
Alejandro Fernández	Confidencias Reales	7 February 2015	1
Enrique Iglesias	Sex and Love †(2014)	14 February 2015	2
Ricky Martin	A Quien Quiera Escuchar	28 February 2015	1
Juan Gabriel	Los Dúo †(2015)	7 March 2015	9
Maná	Cama Incendiada	9 May 2015	2
Alejandro Sanz	Sirope	23 May 2015	1
Maná	Cama Incendiada	30 May 2015	6
Juan Gabriel	Los Dúo †(2015)	11 July 2015	1
Maná	Cama Incendiada	18 July 2015	2
Juan Gabriel	Los Dúo †(2015)	1 August 2015	2
Juan Gabriel	Mis Número 1...40 Aniversario	15 August 2015	2
Carlos Vives	Mas + Corazon: Profundo Tour, En Vivo Desde La Bahia de Santa Marta	29 August 2015	1
Julieta Venegas	Algo Sucede	5 September 2015	1
Gloria Trevi	El Amor	12 September 2015	2
Juan Gabriel	Mis Número 1...40 Aniversario	26 September 2015	1
Juan Gabriel	Los Dúo †(2015)	3 October 2015	1
Juan Gabriel	Mis Número 1...40 Aniversario	10 October 2015	1
Julio Iglesias	México	17 October 2015	1
Juan Gabriel	Mis Número 1...40 Aniversario	24 October 2015	1
Il Volo	Grande Amore	31 October 2015	1
Juan Gabriel	Los Dúo †(2015)	7 November 2015	2
Andrea Bocelli	Cinema (Edición en Español)	21 November 2015	1
Carla Morrison	Amor Supremo	28 November 2015	1
Il Divo	Amor & Pasión	5 December 2015	3
Jesse & Joy	Un Besito Más	26 December 2015	1
Juan Gabriel	Los Dúo, Vol. 2 †(2016)	2 January 2016	7
Sin Bandera	Una Ultima Vez	12 March 2016	1
Evelyn Rubio	Hombres	19 March 2016	2
Juan Gabriel	Los Dúo, Vol. 2 †(2016)	2 April 2016	3
Selena	Lo Mejor de...Selena	23 April 2016	1
Juan Gabriel	Los Dúo, Vol. 2 †(2016)	30 April 2016	1
Various Artists	We Love Disney	7 May 2016	1
Juan Gabriel	Los Dúo, Vol. 2 †(2016)	14 May 2016	2
Thalía	Latina	28 May 2016	2
Kany García	Limonada	11 June 2016	2
Juan Gabriel	Los Dúo, Vol. 2 †(2016)	25 June 2016	1
Gloria Trevi	Inmortal	2 July 2016	1
Pepe Aguilar	No Lo Había Dicho	9 July 2016	1
Juan Gabriel	Los Dúo †(2015)	16 July 2016	2
Reik	Des/Amor	30 July 2016	2
Juan Gabriel	Los Dúo †(2015)	13 August 2016	1
Ricardo Arjona	Apague la Luz y Escuche	20 August 2016	2
Juan Gabriel	Vestido de Etiqueta por Eduardo Magallanes	3 September 2016	2
CNCO	Primera Cita	17 September 2016	1
Juan Gabriel	Los Dúo, Vol. 2 †(2016)	24 September 2016	8
Ricardo Montaner	Ida y Vuelta	19 November 2016	1
Juan Gabriel	Los Dúo, Vol. 2 †(2016)	26 November 2016	4
Various artists	De Puerto Rico Para El Mundo	24 December 2016	3
Juan Gabriel	Los Dúo, Vol. 2 †(2016)	14 January 2017	4
CNCO	Primera Cita	11 February 2017	2
Selena	Ones	25 February 2017	6
Alejandro Fernández	Rompiendo Fronteras	8 April 2017	1
Selena	Ones	15 April 2017	2
CNCO	Primera Cita	29 April 2017	2
Ricardo Arjona	Circo Soledad	13 May 2017	1
CNCO	Primera Cita	20 May 2017	2
Juanes	Mis Planes Son Amarte	3 June 2017	1
CNCO	Primera Cita	10 June 2017	1
Shakira	El Dorado †(2017 and 2018)	17 June 2017	5
Gloria Trevi & Alejandra Guzman	Verses	22 July 2017	1
Shakira	El Dorado †(2017 and 2018)	29 July 2017	39
CNCO	CNCO	21 April 2018	3
Shakira	El Dorado †(2017 and 2018)	12 May 2018	3
Sebastián Yatra	Mantra	2 June 2018	2
Shakira	El Dorado †(2017 and 2018)	16 June 2018	16
Selena	Ones	6 October 2018	5
Draco Rosa	Monte Sagrado	10 November 2018	1
Rosalia	El mal querer	17 November 2018	1
Thalía	Valiente	24 November 2018	1
Selena	Ones	1 December 2018	11
Luis Fonsi	Vida †(2019)	16 February 2019	10
Sebastián Yatra	Fantasia	27 April 2019	1
Luis Fonsi	Vida †(2019)	4 May 2019	7
Santana	Africa Speaks	22 June 2019	4
Luis Fonsi	Vida †(2019)	20 July 2019	12
José José	Serie Platino-20 Exitos Vol. 2	12 October 2019	1
Santana	Africa Speaks	19 October 2019	1
CNCO	Que Quienes Somos (EP)	26 October 2019	3
Luis Fonsi	Vida †(2019)	16 November 2019	1
Selena	Ones	23 November 2019	2
Juanes	Más Futuro Que Pasado	7 December 2019	1
Luis Fonsi	Vida †(2019)	14 December 2019	3
