= Notte Magica - A Tribute to the Three Tenors =

Live album by Il Volo with Plácido Domingo
- Released: September 30, 2016
- Recorded: July 1st, 2016
- Venue: Piazza Santa Croce, Florence
- Genre: pop-opera; opera
- Length: 67:19
- Language: Italian, English, Spanish
- Label: Sony Masterworks
- Producer: Michele Torpedine

Il Volo chronology
Grande Amore (2015)	Notte Magica - A Tribute to the Three Tenors (2016)	Ámame (2018)

Notte Magica - A Tribute to the Three Tenors is the fourth live album by Italian operatic pop trio Il Volo, with the participation of Plácido Domingo as a performer and conductor. The recording was released worldwide on September 30, 2016 by Sony Masterworks. It peaked at number 1 on the Billboard Top Classical Albums and it was certified platinum in Italy by the Federazione Industria Musicale Italiana.

== Recording ==
The album was recorded on July 1, 2016 at the Il Volo concert in Piazza Santa Croce in Florence with the orchestra of the Teatro Massimo di Palermo. It pays tribute to The Three Tenors on the occasion of the twenty-sixth anniversary of their iconic first concert held on the eve of the Italia '90 World Cup and features a selection of the repertoire performed by Domingo, Pavarotti and Carreras during their tournées, including popular Neapolitan songs, Italian and international classics, themes from musicals and classical opera arias. Plácido Domingo himself took part in the concert, conducting the orchestra in eight pieces, with Maestro Marcello Rota alternating as conductor, and joining the trio to sing "Non ti scordar di me". The project was also supported by the Luciano Pavarotti Foundation.

== Promotion ==
Il Volo began to promote the album in September 2016, performing "Nessun Dorma" on NBC's America's Got Talent Season 11 finale, joined on stage by AGT contestants Laura Bretan, Sofie Dossi and Viktor Kee.

Shortly before the release of the album, the audio version of "My Way" exclusively premiered on Billboard magazine's official website on September 14, 2016 and the audio version of "Maria" on broadwayworld.com on September 22, 2016. On September 28, 2016 People magazine's website shared an exclusive first look at "Granada" video.

The trio performed the bonus track "Adeste Fideles" on NBC's Today Show in New York City on December 23, 2016 and came back to the show on March 3, 2017 to perform "Nessun Dorma", just before starting their Notte Magica World Tour from the Radio City Music Hall on March 4.

== Track listing ==
=== Standard Edition ===
Standard Edition - CD & digital download
No.	Title	Writer(s)	Length
1.	"Turandot: Nessun dorma"	Giacomo Puccini, Giuseppe Adami, Renato Simoni	3:32
2.	"Granada"	Agustín Lara	4:28
3.	"Mattinata"	Ruggero Leoncavallo	2:40
4.	"L'elisir d'amore: Una furtiva lagrima"	Gaetano Donizetti, Felice Romani	4:35
5.	"La Danza"	Gioachino Rossini, Carlo Pepoli	3:37
6.	"Tosca: E lucevan le stelle"	Giacomo Puccini, Giuseppe Giacosa, Luigi Illica	3:09
7.	"Torna a Surriento"	Ernesto De Curtis, Giambattista De Curtis	3:48
8.	"Core 'ngrato"	Riccardo Cordiferro, Salvatore Cardillo	3:00
9.	"'O paese d' 'o sole"	Vincenzo D'Annibale, Libero Bovio	3:33
10.	"Maria"	Leonard Bernstein, Stephen Sondheim	3:15
11.	"My Way"	Claude François, Paul Anka, Jacques Revaux	3:54
12.	"Tonight"	Leonard Bernstein, Stephen Sondheim	2:46
13.	"'O surdato 'nnammurato"	Aniello Califano, Enrico Cannio	2:05
14.	"Mamma"	Cesare Andrea Bixio, Bixio Cherubini	3:42
15.	"Cielito lindo"	Quirino Mendoza y Cortés	2:42
16.	"En Aranjuez con tu amor"	Joaquín Rodrigo	3:37
17.	"La tabernera del puerto: No puede ser"	Federico Romero, Guillermo Fernández-Shaw, Pablo Sorozábal	2:48
18.	"Non ti scordar di me" (feat. Plácido Domingo)	Domenico Furnò, Ernesto De Curtis	3:31
19.	"'O sole mio"	Giovanni Capurro, Eduardo Di Capua	4:05
20.	"La traviata: Libiamo ne' lieti calici"	Giuseppe Verdi, Francesco Maria Piave	3:22
21.	"Ave Maria, Mater Misericordiae" (bonus track)	Romano Musumarra, Giorgio Flavio Pintus	3:26
22.	"Adeste fideles" (bonus track)	John Francis Wade	3:15

=== Deluxe Edition ===
CD1
No.	Title	Writer(s)	Length
1.	"La forza del destino: sinfonia"	Giuseppe Verdi	8:04
2.	"Turandot: Nessun dorma"	Giacomo Puccini, Giuseppe Adami, Renato Simoni	3:32
3.	"Granada"	Agustín Lara	4:28
4.	"Mattinata"	Ruggero Leoncavallo	2:40
5.	"L'elisir d'amore: Una furtiva lagrima"	Gaetano Donizetti, Felice Romani	4:35
6.	"La danza"	Gioachino Rossini, Carlo Pepoli	3:37
7.	"Tosca: E lucevan le stelle"	Giacomo Puccini, Giuseppe Giacosa, Luigi Illica	3:09
8.	"Torna a Surriento"	Ernesto De Curtis, Giambattista De Curtis	3:48
9.	"Manon Lescaut: intermezzo"	Giacomo Puccini	5:24
10.	"Core 'ngrato"	Alessandro Sisca, Salvatore Cardillo	3:00
11.	"'O paese d' 'o sole"	Vincenzo D'Annibale, Libero Bovio	3:33
12.	"Maria"	Leonard Bernstein, Stephen Sondheim	3:15
13.	"My Way"	Claude François, Paul Anka, Jacques Revaux	3:54
14.	"Tonight"	Leonard Bernstein, Stephen Sondheim	2:46

CD2
No.	Title	Writer(s)	Length
1.	"'O surdato 'nnammurato"	Aniello Califano, Enrico Cannio	2:05
2.	"Mamma"	Cesare Andrea Bixio, Bixio Cherubini	3:42
3.	"Cavalleria rusticana: intermezzo"	Pietro Mascagni	3:47
4.	"Cielito lindo"	Quirino Mendoza y Cortés	2:42
5.	"En Aranjuez con tu amor"	Joaquín Rodrigo	3:37
6.	"La tabernera del puerto: No puede ser"	Federico Romero Sarachaga, Guillermo Fernández-Shaw Iturralde, Pablo Sorozábal	2:48
7.	"Non ti scordar di me" (feat Plácido Domingo)	Domenico Furnò, Ernesto De Curtis	3:31
8.	"'O sole mio"	Giovanni Capurro, Eduardo di Capua, Alfredo Mazzucchi	4:05
9.	"La traviata: Libiamo ne' lieti calici"	Giuseppe Verdi, Francesco Maria Piave	3:22
10.	"Ave Maria, Mater Misericordiae" (bonus track)	Romano Musumarra, Giorgio Flavio Pintus	3:26
11.	"Adeste Fideles" (bonus track)	John Francis Wade	3:15

DVD
No.	Title	Length
1.	"The Concert Firenze July, 1st 2016"
2.	"Notte Magica – Behind the Scenes"
3.	"Il Volo @ Casa Museo Pavarotti (Luciano Pavarotti House Museum)"

== Personnel ==
Il Volo

- Piero Barone – vocals (tenor)
- Ignazio Boschetto – vocals (tenor)
- Gianluca Ginoble – vocals (baritone)

Additional musicians

- Plácido Domingo - conductor (on "La forza del destino", "Nessun dorma", "Granada", "Una furtiva lagrima", "E lucevan le stelle", "En aranjuez con tu amor", "No puede ser", "Libiamo ne' lieti calici"), vocals (in "Non ti scordar di me")
- Marcello Rota - conductor
- Orchestra del Teatro Massimo di Palermo - orchestra
- Schola Cantorum Labronica - choir (in "Nessun dorma", "Libiamo ne' lieti calici", "Adeste Fideles")
- Maurizio Preziosi – choir conductor
- Coro delle voci bianche della scuola musica di Fiesole - choir (in "Mamma")
- Joan Yakkey - choir conductor

Production and technical

- Michele Torpedine - producer
- Maurizio Maggi – audio recording engineer
- Matteo Maddalena - audio recording engineer
- Luciano Serena - mastering, mixing, sound supervision
- Giampiero Grani - arranger, orchestration (on "La danza", "Torna a Surriento", "Core ‘ngrato", "My Way", "Tonight", "’O surdato ‘nnammurato", "Cielito lindo", "’O sole mio"), musical consultant
- Diego Basso - arranger, orchestration (on "Mattinata", "Mamma")
- Chris Walden - arranger, orchestration (on "Maria")
- Fabrizio Francia - arranger, orchestration (on "Non ti scordar di me")
- Vincenzo Anselmi - arranger, orchestration (on "Non ti scordar di me")
- Celso Valli - producer, arranger (on "Ave Maria, Mater Misericordiae")
- Marco Borsatti - engineer, mixing (on "Ave Maria, Mater Misericordiae")
- Giordano Mazzi - editing, programming (on "Ave Maria, Mater Misericordiae")
- Giovanni Gastel - photography
- Angelo Trani - live photography
- Daniela Boccadoro - artwork
- Cristian Biondani - director
- Eugene O’Connor - director of photography
- John McCullagh - director of photography
- Max Bettoni - producer
- Fabio Battistin – producer
- Mirko Serino - editor
- Francesco De Cave - show designer
- Igor Ronchese - set designer
- Alessio Guerrieri - stage manager
- Fabio Venturi - live sound engineer
- Enrico Belli - live sound engineer
- Andrea Tesini - monitor engineer

== Charts ==
Chart (2016)	Peak position
Argentine Albums (CAPIF)	6
Australian Classical Albums (ARIA)	4
Austrian Albums (Ö3 Austria)	33
Belgian Albums (Ultratop Wallonia)	74
German Classical Albums (Offizielle Deutsche Charts)	7
Italian Albums (FIMI)	2
Japanese Albums (Oricon)	121
Mexican Albums (Top 100 Mexico)	9
Polish Albums (ZPAV)	35
South Korean Albums (Circle)	61
South Korean International Albums (Circle)	7
Spanish Albums (Promusicae)	20
Swiss Albums (Schweizer Hitparade)	33
UK Classical Albums (Official Charts Company)	16
US Billboard 200	186
US Top Classical Albums (Billboard)	1
US Top Album Sales (Billboard)	58
US Top Internet Albums (Billboard)	16

== Certifications ==
Region	Certification	Certified units/sales
Italy (FIMI)	Platinum	50,000^{*}
^{*} Sales figures based on certification alone.
