= Il Volo Takes Flight =

Il Volo... Takes Flight - Live From Detroit Opera House

Live album by Il Volo
- Released: February 28, 2012
- Recorded: 27 October 2011; Detroit Opera House
- Genres: Pop-opera; Easy Listening
- Length: 54:48
- Languages: Italian, English
- Label: Geffen Records
- Producers: Tony Renis, Humberto Gatica

Il Volo chronology
Christmas Favorites (2011)	Il Volo... Takes Flight - Live From Detroit Opera House (2012)	We Are Love (2012)

Il Volo... Takes Flight: Live from the Detroit Opera House is the first live album by Italian operatic pop trio Il Volo. The album was recorded during one their first North American shows. It includes eight tracks from their debut album, Il Volo.

The album went gold in Mexico and has sold more than 46,000 copies in USA

== Reviews ==
Jon O'Brien of AllMusic gave the album 3.5 out of 5 saying, “[The album] showcase their impressively mature and warm romantic tones in front of a lush 66-piece orchestra and a receptive sellout crowd” He added it’s “a far more authentic proposition on record than their older counterparts, Il Divo”

== Track listing ==
No.	Title	Writer(s)	Length
1.	"Il Mondo"	Gianni Meccia, Jimmy Fontana, Carlo Pes, Italo Greco	4:09
2.	"Un Amore Cosi' Grande"	Guido Maria Ferilli, Antonella Maggio	3:20
3.	"Ti Voglio Tanto Bene"	Ernesto De Curtis	2:44
4.	"Granada"	Agustín Lara	3:59
5.	"E Piu’ Ti Penso"	Ennio Morricone, Tony Renis, Mogol	4:54
6.	"'O sole mio"	Giovanni Capurro, Eduardo Di Capua, Alfredo Mazzucchi	3:41
7.	"Non ti scordar di me"	Ernesto Curtis, Domenico Furno	3:27
8.	"This Time"	Michael Busbee, K. Griffin, M. Lewis	3:10
9.	"Smile"	Charlie Chaplin, John Turner, John Turner	4:51
10.	"Mattinata"	Ruggero Leoncavallo	2:43
11.	"Music Proibita"	Stanislao Gastaldon	3:26
12.	"Mamma"	Cesare Andrea Bixio	3:40
13.	"La Luna Hizo Esto (feat. Pia Toscano) "	Edgar Cortázar, Mark Portman, Diane Warren	3:34
14.	"Notte Stellata [The Swan]"	Tony Renis, Camille Saint-Saëns	3:54
15.	"Funiculì, Funiculà"	Luigi Denza	3:26
Total length:			54:49

== Credits ==
- Arranged By: William Ross, Kenny O'Brien, Steven Mercurio
- Art Direction, Design: Liam Ward
- Bass: Reggie Hamilton
- Conductor [Orchestra]: Steven Mercurio
- Coordinator: Joann Tominaga
- Drums: Blair Sinta
- Engineer: Kenny O’Brien, Favio Esquivel
- Guitar: Corrado Sgandurra
- Guitar: Dean Parks
- Mixed By: Cristian Robles
- Photography By: Glenn Corcoran
- Piano, Keyboards: Randy Kerber

== Charts ==
=== Weekly charts ===
Chart (2012)	Peak position
Belgian Albums (Ultratop Wallonia)	95
Italian Albums (FIMI)	37
US Billboard 200	85
US Top Classical Albums (Billboard)	1

=== Year-end charts ===
Chart (2012)	Peak position
US Top Classical Albums (Billboard)	9

== Certifications ==
Region	Certification	Certified units/sales
Mexico (AMPROFON)	Gold	30,000^{^}
^{^} Shipments figures based on certification alone.
