= Il Volo (album) =

Studio album by Il Volo
- Released: November 30, 2010
- Genre: Pop; pop-opera
- Length: 49:24
- Language: Italian, English, Spanish
- Label: Geffen
- Producer: Humberto Gatica, Tony Renis

Il Volo chronology
Il Volo (2010)	Christmas Favorites (2011)

Singles from Il Volo
- 1. "'O Sole Mio" Released: 28 February 2011

Il Volo is the self-titled debut album from the pop-opera trio Il Volo, formed on the Italian singing competition Ti lascio una canzone. The album, produced by Humberto Gatica and Italian singer-producer Tony Renis, was released in Italy on November 30, 2010 and in the United States on May 17, 2011. It reached the top spot in the Austrian Albums Chart and it was certified Platinum in Italy by the Federation of the Italian Music Industry. The Spanish edition of the album received a nomination for Best Pop Album by a Duo or Group with Vocals at the 12th Latin Grammy Awards in 2011.

== Reception ==
Professional ratings
Review scores
Source	Rating
Allmusic	3.5/5 stars

=== Chart performance ===
The album debuted at number 33 on the Italian Albums Chart during the week ending on December 5, 2010 and it peaked at number 6 in January 2011. Il Volo was later certified Platinum by the Federation of the Italian Music Industry for sales of 60,000 copies in Italy.

In May 2011, the International Version of the album debuted at number 10 on the US Billboard 200, selling 23,000 copies in its first week. During the same week, the album also debuted at number 1 on the US Top Classical Albums chart. In Canada, the album debuted at number 55 on the Canadian Albums Chart.

It also entered the charts in several European countries, reaching the Top 10 in the Netherlands, Germany, France and Belgium. In July 2011, the album also entered the Austrian Albums Chart at number 2, and it reached the top spot during its second week.

== Track listing ==
=== Italian version ===
Italian Version - CD & digital download
No.	Title	Writer(s)	Length
1.	"Il mondo"	Gianni Meccia, Jimmy Fontana, Carlo Pes, Italo Greco	4:21
2.	"E più ti penso"	Ennio Morricone, Tony Renis, Mogol	4:47
3.	"È la mia vita"	Pino Marino, Maurizio Fabrizio	4:09
4.	"'O sole mio"	Giovanni Capurro, Eduardo Di Capua, Alfredo Mazzucchi	3:36
5.	"El reloj"	Roberto Cantoral	4:09
6.	"Smile"	Charlie Chaplin, John Turner, John Turner	4:47
7.	"Notte stellata (The Swan)"	Tony Renis, Camille Saint-Saëns	3:50
8.	"La luna hizo esto"	Mark Portman, Diane Warren, Edgar Cortázar	3:28
9.	"Per te"	Marco Marinangeli, Josh Groban, Walter Afanasieff	5:03
10.	"Un amore così grande"	Antonella Maggio, Guido Ferilli	4:22
Total length:			42:32

Special Christmas Edition additional tracks
No.	Title	Writer(s)	Length
11.	"Painfully Beautiful"	Diane Warren	3:45
12.	"This Time"	Kevin Griffin, Mike Busbee, Michelle Robin Lewis	3:06

Special Christmas Edition additional EP
No.	Title	Writer(s)	Length
1.	"Silent Night"	Franz Xaver Gruber, Joseph Mohr
2.	"Panis angelicus"	Thomas Aquinas, César Franck
3.	"Christmas Medley" (Jingle Bell Rock, Let It Snow, It's the Most Wonderful Time of the Year)	Joe Beal, Jim Boothe, Sammy Cahn, Jule Styne, Eddie Pola, George Wyle
4.	"The Christmas Song" (feat. Pia Toscano)	Mel Tormé, Bob Wells
5.	"Stille nacht"	Franz Xaver Gruber, Joseph Mohr

=== International version ===
International Version - CD & digital download
No.	Title	Writer(s)	Length
1.	"Il mondo"	Gianni Meccia, Jimmy Fontana, Carlo Pes, Italo Greco	4:21
2.	"E più ti penso"	Ennio Morricone, Tony Renis, Mogol	4:47
3.	"'O sole Mio"	Giovanni Capurro, Eduardo Di Capua, Alfredo Mazzucchi	3:36
4.	"Un amore così grande"	Antonella Maggio, Guido Ferilli	4:22
5.	"El reloj"	Roberto Cantoral	4:10
6.	"Smile"	Charlie Chaplin, John Turner, Geoffrey Parsons	4:48
7.	"Per Te"	Marco Marinangeli, Josh Groban, Walter Afanasieff	5:03
8.	"La luna hizo esto"	Mark Portman, Diane Warren, Edgar Cortázar	3:29
9.	"È la mia vita"	Pino Marino, Maurizio Fabrizio	4:09
10.	"Notte stellata (The Swan)"	Tony Renis, Camille Saint-Saëns	3:52
11.	"Painfully Beautiful"	Diane Warren	3:45
12.	"This Time"	Kevin Griffin, Mike Busbee, Michelle Robin Lewis	3:06
Total length:			49:24

=== Spanish version ===
Spanish Version - CD & digital download
No.	Title	Writer(s)	Length
1.	"Hasta el final"	Adam Anders, Claudia Brant, Marco Marinangeli	4:35
2.	"Gira, el mundo gira"	Jimmy Fontana, Italo Greco, Gianni Meccia, Carlo Pes, Alejandro Lerner	4:21
3.	"El reloj"	Roberto Cantoral	4:09
4.	"Nuestro amor es más que grande"	Antonella Maggio, Guido Ferilli, Claudia Brant	4:22
5.	"'O sole mio"	Giovanni Capurro, Eduardo Di Capua, Alfredo Mazzucchi	3:35
6.	"La luna hizo esto"	Mark Portman, Diane Warren, Edgar Cortázar	3:28
7.	"Así será"	Marco Marinangeli, Josh Groban, Walter Afanasieff, Claudia Brant	5:03
8.	"Mi vida"	Maurizio Fabrizio, Pino Marino, Alejandro Lerner	4:09
9.	"Notte stellata (Noche de estrellas)"	Tony Renis, Camille Saint-Saëns	3:50
10.	"Smile (Sonríe)"	John Turner, Geoffrey Parsons, Charlie Chaplin	4:46
11.	"E più ti penso (Pienso en ti)"	Ennio Morricone, Tony Renis	4:47
Total length:			47:05

== Charts and certifications ==
=== Charts ===
Chart (2010–2012)	Peak position
Australian Albums Chart	18
Austrian Albums Chart	1
Belgian Albums Chart (Flanders)	42
Belgian Albums Chart (Wallonia)	3
Canadian Albums Chart	55
Dutch Albums Chart	7
French Albums Chart	10
German Albums Chart	8
Italian Albums Chart	6
Irish Albums Chart	10
Mexican Albums Chart	10
New Zealand Albums Chart	2
Portuguese Albums Chart	25
Spanish Albums Chart	21
Swiss Albums Charts	46
UK Albums Chart	43
US Billboard 200	10
US Billboard Classical Albums	1
US Billboard Digital Albums	8
US Billboard Top Latin Albums	4
US Billboard Latin Pop Albums	1

=== Certifications ===
Region	Certification	Certified units/sales
Austria (IFPI Austria)	Gold	10,000^{*}
Italy (FIMI)	Platinum	60,000^{*}
France (SNEP)	Gold	50,000^{*}
Mexico (AMPROFON)	Platinum	60,000^{^}
Netherlands (NVPI)	Gold	25,000^{^}
New Zealand (RMNZ)	Gold	7,500^{^}
United States (RIAA) for the Spanish Edition	Gold (Latin)	50,000^{^}
^{*} Sales figures based on certification alone.^{^} Shipments figures based on certification alone.

=== Year-end charts ===
Year	Chart	Position
2010	Italian Albums Chart	86
2011	German Albums Chart	97
2012	US Billboard Classical Albums Chart	8

== Release history ==
Region	Date	Label	Format	Edition
Italy	November 30, 2010	Geffen	CD, digital download	Italian Version
United States	May 17, 2011	Geffen	CD, digital download	International Version
United States	June 7, 2011	Geffen	CD, digital download	Spanish Version
United Kingdom	October 31, 2011	Polydor	CD, digital download	International Version
Germany	November 11, 2011	Geffen	CD, digital download	Christmas Edition
United States	November 21, 2011	Geffen	CD, digital download	Christmas Edition
Italy	November 22, 2011	Geffen	CD, digital download	Christmas Edition

== See also ==
- List of number-one Billboard Latin Pop Albums from the 2010s
