= Emilio Munda =

- Born: Emilio Munda; 14 January 1982 (age 44)
- Origin: Fermo, Italy
- Genre: Pop
- Occupations: Composer, songwriter, arranger
- Instruments: Vocals, piano, acoustic guitar, electric guitar, keyboards, sampler, percussion
- Years active: 2008–present
- Label: Sugar Music
- Website: Emilio Munda

Emilio Munda (born 14 January 1982) is an Italian songwriter, arranger, composer and producer.
He placed third at the 69th Sanremo Festival as an author and composer of the song "Musica che resta" for the international group Il Volo and ranked second at the 70th Sanremo Festival as author and composer of the song "8 Marzo" interpreted by Tecla Insolia also winning the critics' award.

He composed songs for Eros Ramazzotti, Umberto Tozzi, Francesco Renga, Nina Zilli, Gemelli Diversi, Nomadi, Sergio Dalma, Tecla Insolia, Il Volo, Dear Jack, Michele Bravi, Valerio Scanu, Silvia Mezzanotte, and for other artists of Italian television talent: The Voice of Italy, Amici di Maria De Filippi and X Factor

== Life and career ==
Emilio Munda was born in Fermo, central Italy, in 1982. His family introduced him to music at the age of four when he began learning to play the drums. His compositions have been performed by various artists from both the Italian and international music scenes, earning gold and platinum records in Italy and worldwide. Twice in a row, he reached the podium at the Sanremo Music Festival as a songwriter and composer.

He wrote the single "Cerco ancora te" for Umberto Tozzi, which was included in the album Non solo live. The song was later re-released in France, Belgium and Switzerland as part of Yesterday, a collection of the singer's international hits.. Following this Emilio Munda won an international songwriting competition held by singer Francesco Renga. After his victory, he was offered a three-year exclusive contract to work with Renga himself.
Munda's original songs were released as part of Renga's Un giorno bellissimo album, which was awarded a gold record at Wind Music Awards. One of Munda's songs, "Di sogni e illusioni", was also included in Fermoimmagine Deluxe, Renga's first hits collection, released after his participation in the 62nd Sanremo edition.

Since then, Munda has been collaborating with the Italian record label Sugar Music. In 2014 Emilio Munda's song "Puoi scegliere" was selected by The Voice of Italy finalist and Sanremo participant Veronica De Simone for inclusion in her album Ti presento Maverick. Shortly afterward, a new album/collection by Francesco Renga, titled The Platinum Collection was released, featuring two songs composed by Munda himself.

He then published his song "Un mondo più vero" as the fourth track of the new album A passi piccoli by Michele Bravi, the winner of the seventh edition of X-Factor Italy.

Subsequently the new album of Dear Jack, Domani è un altro film (seconda parte) was released, containing the song "Le strade del mio tempo" written by Emilio Munda. The album was certified platinum by FIMI on 29 May 2015.

He went on to be the author and composer of the song "La Fiamma", which was included in the Gemelli Diversi’s album Uppercat, released on 21 October. Munda also wrote the fifth track of that album, "Un soffio dal traguardo". Later, he became the author and composer for Nina Zilli, composing the song "Per un niente" for her album Modern art. According to "All Music", the song is the album's best track.

In a subsequent collaboration with Nomadi for the production of the album Nomadi dentro. He also wrote, along with Beppe Carletti, the song "Può succedere", where Munda is credited as both author and composer. He then renewed his collaboration with Michele Bravi, writing the song entitled "Il sole contro", which is inserted in the album Anime di carta - Nuove Pagine and the song written for Nina Zilli was re-released in Modern Art Sanremo Edition, which was published in conjunction with the Sanremo Festival. Continuing his work, he wrote the summer single for the singer Valerio Scanu titled: "Capovolgo il mondo" and also composed the song "L'ultimo spettacolo", both of which are new tracks included in the album DIECI.

== More recent collaborations ==
In 2019, he presented the song "Musica che resta" performed by Il Volo at the Sanremo Festival. The following year, he brought the song "8 marzo" performed by Tecla Insolia to the Sanremo Festival, reaching the podium with both songs.

The following year he collaborated with Eros Ramazzotti in writing the song "El Paraíso Junto a Mí" for the international artist Sergio Dalma which earned a gold record in Spain. Around the same time Munda was selected as a judge to help choose the artists who would take the prestigious stage of the Eurovision Song Contest.

In 2022, he worked on Eros Ramazzotti's album composing three songs: "Ti dedico", "Nessuno a parte noi" and '"Gli Ultimi romantici". The latter was released as a single from the album and reached the top of the charts. The album "Battito Infinito" was certified gold the following year.

== Discography ==
=== Major songs ===
The collaborations are listed in parentheses in the title section.

| Year | Song | Artist | Album |
|---|---|---|---|
| 2008 | "Non c'è contatto" (Composer and author with Silvia Mezzanotte and Matteo Gaggioli) | Silvia Mezzanotte | Lunatica |
| 2008 | "Ma il buio" (Composer and author with Silvia Mezzanotte and Matteo Gaggioli) | Silvia Mezzanotte | Lunatica |
| 2009 | "Cerco ancora te" (Composer with Matteo Gaggioli) | Umberto Tozzi | Non solo live |
| 2010 | "Stai con me" (Composer and author with Francesco Renga) | Francesco Renga | Un giorno bellissimo |
| 2010 | "Di sogni e illusioni" (Author with Francesco Renga) (Composer with Francesco Renga and Piero Romitelli) | Francesco Renga | Un giorno bellissimo |
| 2014 | "Puoi scegliere" (Composer and author with Piero Romitelli) | Veronica De Simone | Ti presento Maverick |
| 2014 | "Un mondo più vero" (Composer and author with Piero Romitelli) | Michele Bravi | A passi piccoli |
| 2015 | "Le strade del mio tempo" (Composer and author with Piero Romitelli) | Dear Jack | Domani è un altro film (Seconda parte) |
| 2016 | "La fiamma" (Composer and author with Piero Romitelli and Mario Cianchi) | Gemelli Diversi | Uppercut |
| 2016 | "Un soffio dal traguardo" (Composer and author with Piero Romitelli and Mario Cianchi) | Gemelli Diversi | Uppercut |
| 2017 | "City on the Lake" (Arranger with Frank Ricci and Tony Esposito) | Frank Ricci feat Tony Esposito | A Big Dream II |
| 2017 | "Per un niente" (Composer and author with Piero Romitelli) | Nina Zilli | Modern Art |
| 2017 | "Può succedere" (Composer and author with Beppe Carletti) | Nomadi | Nomadi dentro |
| 2017 | "Il sole contro" (Composer and author with Piero Romitelli, Federica Abbate, Michele Bravi, Cheope) | Michele Bravi | Anime di carta - Nuove pagine |
| 2018 | "Capovolgo il mondo" (Composer and author with Davide Sartore and Diego Ceccon) | Valerio Scanu | Dieci |
| 2018 | "L'ultimo spettacolo" (Composer and author with Giulio Pretto) | Valerio Scanu | Dieci |
| 2019 | "Musica che resta" (Composer and author with Piero Romitelli and Gianna Nannini) | Il Volo | Musica |
| 2020 | "8 marzo" (Composer and author with Piero Romitelli) | Tecla Insolia | Sanremo Festival |
| 2021 | "El Paraíso Junto a Mí" (Composer and author with Piero Romitelli) | Sergio Dalma | Alegría |
| 2023 | "Ti dedico" (Composer and author with Piero Romitelli) | Eros Ramazzotti | Battito infinito |
| 2023 | "Nessuno a parte noi" (Composer and author with Piero Romitelli) | Eros Ramazzotti | Battito infinito |
| 2023 | "Gli ultimi romantici" (Composer and author with Piero Romitelli) | Eros Ramazzotti | Battito infinito |
