= L'amore si muove =

Studio album by Il Volo
- Released: September 25, 2015
- Recorded: Studio Impatto, Fonoprint
- Genre: Pop; pop-opera
- Language: Italian, English, Spanish
- Label: Sony Music International
- Producer: Emilio Estefan, Celso Valli, Cheche Alara, Michele Torpedine

Il Volo chronology
Sanremo grande amore (2015)	L'amore si muove (2015)	Notte Magica - A Tribute to the Three Tenors (2016)

Singles from L'amore si muove
- 1. "L'amore si muove" Released: 28 August 2015; 2. "Per te ci sarò" Released: 13 November 2015; 3. "Tornerà l'amore" Released: 5 February 2016

Singles from Grande Amore
- 1. "Grande amore" Released: 10 July 2015; 2. "Si Me Falta Tu Mirada" Released: 10 December 2015

L'amore si muove ("Love Moves") is the fourth studio album by Italian operatic pop trio Il Volo. It was released internationally under the title Grande amore (English: "Great Love") The album is a mix of original songs and cover versions, in Italian, English and Spanish. The album debuted at number 2 in Italy and reached the top spot on its second week. It was certified double platinum by Federazione Industria Musicale Italiana. Grande Amore peaked at number 1 on the Billboard Top Classical Albums and Billboard Latin Pop Albums, and at number 2 on the Billboard Top Latin Albums chart.

== Reviews ==
Robyn Gallagher of Wiwibloggs said; "'L'amore si muove/Grande Amore' shows Il Volo doing what they do best. The trio reliably deliver bold, passionate songs in Italian, English and Spanish, putting a modern spin on canzone classics as well as introducing new material."

== Singles ==
The lead single was the title track "L'amore si muove" released on August 28. The video premiered on 4 September 2015.

The International and Spanish editions include the group's Eurovision Song Contest 2015 song, "Grande Amore".

== Track listings ==
=== L'amore si muove ===
Italian Version - CD & digital download
No.	Title	Writer(s)	Length
1.	"L'amore si muove"	Francesco Renga, Luca Chiaravalli	3:39
2.	"Quando l'amore diventa poesia"	Mogol, Piero Soffici	3:12
3.	"Io che non vivo (Senza te)"	Pino Donaggio, Vito Pallavicini	2:47
4.	"Il tuo sguardo manca"	Marco Marinangeli, Claudia Brant, Cheope, Federica Abbate	3:42
5.	"The Best Day of My Life"	Cory Rooney	4:03
6.	"La vita"	Antonio Amurri, Bruno Canfora	3:34
7.	"Nel blu dipinto di blu (Volare)"	Domenico Modugno, Franco Migliacci	3:44
8.	"Eternally"	Charlie Chaplin, Geoffrey Parsons, John Turner	3:19
9.	"Ricordami"	Natalia Jiménez, Armando Ávila, Cheope	3:37
10.	"Per te ci sarò"	Harry Sommerdahl, Ki Fitzgerald, Victoria Horn, Cheope, Federica Abbate	4:26
11.	"Tornerà l'amore"	Gianclaudia Franchini	4:23
12.	"Aspetterò"	Marco Marinangeli, Wayne Hector, Lars Halvor Jensen, Martin Michael Larsson	3:47
13.	"Beautiful That Way (La vita è bella)"	Noa, Gil Dor, Nicola Piovani	3:44

=== Grande Amore (International Edition) ===
International Version - CD & digital download
No.	Title	Writer(s)	Length
1.	"Grande amore"	Francesco Boccia, Ciro "Tommy" Esposito	3:45
2.	"La vita"	Antonio Amurri, Bruno Canfora	3:35
3.	"Nel blu di pinto di blu (Volare)"	Domenico Modugno, Franco Migliacci	3:45
4.	"Quando l'amore diventa poesia"	Mogol, Piero Soffici	3:13
5.	"Per te ci sarò"	Harry Sommerdahl, Ki Fitzgerald, Victoria Horn, Cheope, Federica Abbate	4:28
6.	"Aspetterò"	Marco Marinangeli, Wayne Hector, Lars Halvor Jensen, Martin Michael Larsson	3:48
7.	"L'amore si muove"	Francesco Renga, Luca Chiaravalli	3:39
8.	"You Don't Have to Say You Love Me [Io Che Non Vivo (Senza Te)]"	Pino Donaggio, Vito Pallavicini, Simon Napier-Bell, Vicki Wickham	2:48
9.	"Eternally"	Charlie Chaplin, Geoffrey Parsons, John Turner	3:21
10.	"Si Me Falta Tu Mirada (Il tuo sguardo manca)"	Marco Marinangeli, Claudia Brant	3:41
11.	"Delilah"	Barry Mason, Les Reed	3:24
12.	"L'immensità"	Don Backy, Mogol, Detto Mariano	3:59
13.	"Caruso"	Lucio Dalla	5:22
14.	"The Best Day of My Life"	Cory Rooney	4:04
15.	"Beautiful That Way (La vita è bella)"	Noa, Gil Dor, Nicola Piovani	3:45
16.	"Piove (Ciao, ciao bambina)"	Domenico Modugno, Dino Verde	3:33

=== Grande Amore ===
Spanish Version - CD & digital download
No.	Title	Writer(s)	Length
1.	"Grande Amore (Spanish Version)"	Francesco Boccia, Ciro "Tommy" Esposito, Jose Luis Pagan	3:45
2.	"Si Me Falta Tu Mirada (Il tuo sguardo manca)"	Marco Marinangeli, Claudia Brant	3:41
3.	"En el Centro del Sol (Per te ci sarò)"	Harry Sommerdahl, Ki Fitzgerald, Victoria Horn	4:27
4.	"Y Vendrán Amores (Tornerà l'amore)"	Gianclaudia Franchini	4:24
5.	"Cuando el Amor Se Convierte en Poesia (Quando l'amore diventa poesia)"	Mogol, Piero Soffici	3:13
6.	"El amor Verdadero (L'amore si muove)"	Francesco Renga, Luca Chiaravalli	3:40
7.	"Esperaré (Aspetterò)"	Marco Marinangeli, Wayne Hector, Lars Halvor Jensen, Martin Michael Larsson	3:48
8.	"No Hace Falta"	Randall Barlow, Emilio Estefan, Nicolás Tovar	3:48
9.	"Recuérdame (Ricordami)"	Natalia Jiménez, Armando Ávila	3:39
10.	"La vida (La Vita)"	Antonio Amurri, Bruno Canfora	3:36
11.	"Nel blu di pinto di blu (Volare)"	Domenico Modugno, Franco Migliacci	3:45
12.	"Beautiful That Way (La vita è bella)"	Noa, Gil Dor, Nicola Piovani	3:45
13.	"Piove (Ciao, ciao bambina)"	Domenico Modugno, Dino Verde	3:33

== Charts ==
=== L'amore si muove ===
Chart (2015)	Peak position
Belgian Albums (Ultratop Wallonia)	127
Italian Albums (FIMI)	1
US Top Classical Albums (Billboard)	14

=== Grande amore - International Version ===
Chart (2015)	Peak position
Austrian Albums (Ö3 Austria)	42
Belgian Albums (Ultratop Flanders)	56
Belgian Albums (Ultratop Wallonia)	19
Japanese International Albums (Oricon)	23
South Korean International Albums (Circle)	18
Spanish Albums (Promusicae)	18
Swiss Albums (Schweizer Hitparade)	10
US Billboard 200	188
US Top Classical Albums (Billboard)	1

=== Grande amore ===
Chart (2015–16)	Peak position
Polish Albums (ZPAV)	44
US Top Classical Albums (Billboard)	5
US Latin Pop Albums (Billboard)	1
US Top Latin Albums (Billboard)	2

== Certifications ==
Region	Certification	Certified units/sales
Italy (FIMI)	2× Platinum	100,000^{*}
Mexico (AMPROFON) for Grande Amore	Gold	30,000^{‡}
Poland (ZPAV)	Platinum	20,000^{‡}
^{*} Sales figures based on certification alone.^{‡} Sales+streaming figures based on certification alone.

== See also ==
- List of number-one hits of 2015 (Italy)
- List of number-one Billboard Latin Pop Albums from the 2010s
