= Christmas Favorites (Il Volo EP) =

EP by Il Volo
- Released: 21 November 2011
- Genre: Pop; operatic pop; Christmas music
- Length: 20:00
- Language: English, German
- Label: Geffen Records

Il Volo chronology
Il Volo (2010)	Christmas Favorites (2011)	Il Volo Takes Flight (2012)

Christmas Favorites is the first extended play by Italian operatic pop trio Il Volo. It's a Christmas album featuring five tracks. All five tracks were later included on their 2013 studio album, ‘’Buon Natale: The Christmas Album’’. The EP was also included in a limited Christmas edition re-release of their debut album, Il Volo released on the same day, restricting sales of this EP.

== Track listing ==
No.	Title	Writer(s)	Length
1.	"Silent Night"	Franz Xaver Gruber, Joseph Mohr	4:04
2.	"Panis angelicus"	Saint Thomas Aquinas, William Ross	3:52
3.	"Christmas Medley: Jingle Bell Rock/Let It Snow! Let It Snow! Let It Snow!/It's the Most Wonderful Time of the Year"	Joe Beal, Jim Boothe, Sammy Cahn, Edward Pola, Jule Styne, George Wyle	3:41
4.	"The Christmas Song (featuring Pia Toscano)"	Mel Tormé, Robert Wells	4:21
5.	"Stille Nacht"	Franz Xaver Gruber, Joseph Mohr	4:04

- Note: "Stille Nacht" is "Silent Night" sung in German.

== Charts ==
=== Weekly charts ===
The album has sold 10,000 copies in the US.

Chart (2011)	Peak position
US Top Classical Albums (Billboard)	9

=== Year-end charts ===
Chart (2012)	Peak position
US Top Classical Albums (Billboard)	39
