= Noche Sin Día =

Single by Il Volo featuring Gente de Zona

from the album Ámame
- Released: May 25, 2018
- Recorded: December 2017, Crescent Moon Studios (Miami)
- Length: 2:49
- Label: Sony Latin
- Songwriters: Emilio Estefan, Alexander Delgado Hernández, Randy Malcolm Martínez
- Producer: Emilio Estefan

Il Volo singles chronology
"Tornerà l'amore" (2016)	"Noche Sin Día" (2018)

Gente de Zona singles chronology
"Si No Vuelves" (2016)	"Noche Sin Día" (2018)	"Te Duele" (2018)

Music video
- "Noche Sin Día" on YouTube

"Noche Sin Día" (pronounced [ˈnotʃe sin ˈdi.a]; Spanish for "Night With No Day) is a song recorded by Italian trio Il Volo, featuring Cuban reggaeton duo Gente de Zona. It was released digitally on May 25, 2018, by Sony Music Latin as the lead single from Il Volo's upcoming fifth studio album Ámame.

== Background ==
In May 2017, during a press conference in Milan, Il Volo revealed that they had started working with producer Emilio Estefan on a contemporary music album in Spanish, a tribute to Latin America and its rich diversity of musical genres. In May of 2018 the trio announced through their social networks the release of the first single of the album, "Noche Sin Día", recorded with the Cuban duo Gente de Zona, which mixes urban and pop sounds. Talking about the song Il Volo said: "Together with Gente De Zona, on ‘Noche Sin Día’ we sought to transmit our idea of a fresh, Latin party vibe. We want this to be our calling card as we introduce a new sound to our Latin American fans – one that’s completely different from what we’ve done so far."

== Critical reception ==
Billboard editor Suzette Fernández wrote: "the song takes care of the musical standards of both groups, making the rhythm of the song fit in an organic way."

== Track listing ==
Digital download
No.	Title	Length
1.	"Noche Sin Día" (featuring Gente De Zona)	2:49
2.	"Noche Sin Día - Remix" (featuring Gente De Zona)	3:14

== Music video ==
The song's official music video was directed by Emilio Estefan and David Rousseau and was filmed at the Miami Design District. It premiered on the Spanish-language television program Primer Impacto broadcast by Univision on May 24, 2018 and was released on Il Volo's Vevo account shortly afterwards.

== Charts ==
Chart (2018)	Peak position
US Tropical Airplay (Billboard)	4
US Latin Airplay (Billboard)	46
US Latin Pop Airplay (Billboard)	32
