= Sanremo grande amore =

EP by Il Volo
- Released: 20 February 2015
- Genre: Pop; operatic pop
- Length: 26:32
- Language: Italian
- Label: Columbia
- Producer: Celso Valli, Michele Torpedine

Il Volo chronology
The Platinum Collection (2015)	Sanremo grande amore (2015)	L’amore si muove (2015)

Singles from Sanremo grande amore
- 1. "Grande amore" Released: 12 February 2015

Sanremo grande amore is an extended play by Italian operatic pop trio Il Volo, released in February 2015 following their appearance at the 65th Sanremo Music Festival, in which their song "Grande amore" received first prize in the "Big Artists" category. "Grande amore", released as the set's lead single on 12 February 2015, is the only original composition of the EP. The remaining six tracks are covers of popular Italian songs. Sanremo grande amore is also Il Volo's first release for their new label, Sony Music.

== Track listing ==
No.	Title	Writer(s)	Length
1.	"Grande amore"	Francesco Boccia, Ciro "Tommy" Esposito	3:44
2.	"Ancora" (Eduardo De Crescenzo cover)	Franco Migliacci, Claudio Mattone	3:32
3.	"Vacanze romane" (Matia Bazar cover)	Giancarlo Golzi, Carlo Marrale	4:15
4.	"Canzone per te" (Sergio Endrigo cover)	Luis Bacalov, Sergio Endrigo, Sergio Bardotti	4:00
5.	"Piove (Ciao, ciao bambina)" (Domenico Modugno cover)	Domenico Modugno, Dino Verde	3:33
6.	"Romantica" (Renato Rascel cover)	Renato Rascel, Dino Verde	3:26
7.	"L'immensità" (Don Backy cover)	Mogol, Aldo Caponi, Mariano Detto	4:02
Total length:			26:32

== Charts ==
Chart (2015–16)	Peak position
Austrian Albums (Ö3 Austria)	9
Belgian Albums (Ultratop Flanders)	104
Belgian Albums (Ultratop Wallonia)	59
Greek Albums (IFPI Greece)	20
Dutch Albums (Album Top 100)	63
Italian Albums (FIMI)	1
Polish Albums (ZPAV)	22
Swiss Albums (Schweizer Hitparade)	15
US Top Classical Albums (Billboard)	7

=== Year-end charts ===
Chart (2015)	Position
Italian Albums (FIMI)	7

== Personnel ==
=== Il Volo ===
- Gianluca Ginoble - Baritone
- Piero Barone - Tenor
- Ignazio Boschetto - Tenor

=== Musicians ===
- Celso Valli - Arrangements, production, orchestra conductor, piano and keyboards
- Mattia Tedesco - Electric and acoustic guitars
- Paolo Prosperini - Gipsy guitar
- Massimo Varini - Acoustic guitar (tracks 5 and 6)
- Cesare Chiodo - bass
- Paolo Valli - drums
- Tommy Ruggero - percussions
- Stefano Bussoli - timpani
- Massimo Tagliata - accordion
- CV Strings Ensemble - Strings
- Valentino Corvino - first violin
- Stefano di Battista - Saxophone (track 2)

=== Technical crew ===
- Celso Valli, Michele Torpedine - production
- Enrico Capalbo, Roberto Bartilucci - audio engineering
- Marco Borsatti - audio engineering, mastering
- Giordano Mazzi - editing
- Maurizio Biancani - mastering

== Certifications ==
Region	Certification	Certified units/sales
Italy (FIMI)	3× Platinum	150,000^{*}
^{*} Sales figures based on certification alone.
