= Buon Natale: The Christmas Album =

Studio album by Il Volo
- Released: October 22, 2013
- Genres: Pop-opera; Christmas music
- Length: 49:47
- Languages: Italian, English, Spanish, Latin, German
- Label: Geffen
- Producers: Humberto Gatica, Tony Renis

Il Volo chronology
We Are Love (2012)	Buon Natale: The Christmas Album (2013)	The Platinum Collection (2015)

Buon Natale: The Christmas Album is the third studio album and first Christmas album by Italian operatic pop trio Il Volo, The album features the three singers taking on classic American Christmas songs, many of which are relatively unknown in Italy. The album is the unofficial soundtrack to a PBS holiday television special, Il Volo Buon Natale.

Il Volo toured North American with this album. The trio’s live performances received standing ovations across the U.S. and critical acclaim.

== Charts ==
Chart (2013–15)	Peak position
Belgian Albums (Ultratop Wallonia)	162
Italian Albums (FIMI)	20
South Korean International Albums (Circle)	33
Swiss Albums (Schweizer Hitparade)	97
US Billboard 200	39
US Top Classical Albums (Billboard)	1
US Holiday Albums (Billboard)	1

=== Year-end charts ===
Chart (2013)	Position
US Top Classical Albums (Billboard)	26

== Certifications ==
Region	Certification	Certified units/sales
Italy (FIMI)	Gold	25,000^{*}
^{*} Sales figures based on certification alone.

== Track listing ==
=== International Edition ===
International Version - CD & digital download
No.	Title	Writer(s)	Length
1.	"Ave Maria"	Franz Schubert	4:29
2.	"O Holy Night"	Adolphe Adam, Placide Cappeau	4:35
3.	"I'll Be Home for Christmas"	Kim Gannon, Walter Kent	4:37
4.	"Silent Night"	Franz Xaver Gruber, Joseph Mohr	3:34
5.	"Christmas Medley: Jingle Bell Rock/Let It Snow! Let It Snow! Let It Snow!/It's the Most Wonderful Time of the Year"	Joe Beal, Jim Boothe, Sammy Cahn, Edward Pola, Jule Styne, George Wyle	3:41
6.	"White Christmas"	Irving Berlin	3:31
7.	"Santa Claus Is Coming to Town"	John Frederick Coots, Haven Gillespie	2:28
8.	"Mis Deseos/Feliz Navidad" (feat. Belinda)	José Feliciano	4:26
9.	"Panis angelicus"	Saint Thomas Aquinas, William Ross	3:52
10.	"The Christmas Song" (feat. Pia Toscano)	Mel Tormé, Robert Wells	4:21
11.	"Rockin' Around the Christmas Tree"	Johnny Marks	2:21
12.	"Stille Nacht"	Franz Xaver Gruber, Joseph Mohr	4:04
13.	"Notte Stellata (The Swan)"	Tony Renis, Camille Saint-Saëns	3:52

Buon Natale: Live Solos and Italian Carols
No.	Title	Writer(s)	Length
1.	"Memory" (From the Broadway Musical Cats - Performed by Ignazio Boschetto)	Andrew Lloyd Webber, Trevor Nunn, T. S. Eliot
2.	"Where Do I Begin" (Love Theme From Love Story - Performed by Piero Barone)	Carl Sigman, Francis Lai
3.	"Maria" (From West Side Story - Performed by Gianluca Ginoble)	Stephen Sondheim, Leonard Bernstein
4.	"Astro del Ciel"	Franz Xaver Gruber, Angelo Meli
5.	"Bianco Natale"	Irving Berlin, Filibello

=== Italian Edition ===
Italian Edition - CD & digital download
No.	Title	Writer(s)	Length
1.	"Bianco Natale"	Irving Berlin, Filibello	3:29
2.	"Astro del Ciel"	Franz Xaver Gruber, Angelo Meli	3:31
3.	"Ave Maria"	Franz Schubert	4:27
4.	"O Holy Night"	Adolphe Adam, Placide Cappeau	4:34
5.	"I'll Be Home for Christmas"	Kim Gannon, Walter Kent	4:37
6.	"Christmas Medley: Jingle Bell Rock/Let It Snow! Let It Snow! Let It Snow!/It's the Most Wonderful Time of the Year"	Joe Beal, Jim Boothe, Sammy Cahn, Edward Pola, Jule Styne, George Wyle	3:41
7.	"Santa Claus Is Coming to Town"	John Frederick Coots, Haven Gillespie	2:27
8.	"Mis Deseos/Feliz Navidad" (feat. Belinda)	José Feliciano	4:25
9.	"Panis angelicus"	Saint Thomas Aquinas, William Ross	3:47
10.	"The Christmas Song" (feat. Pia Toscano)	Mel Tormé, Robert Wells	4:20
11.	"Rockin' Around the Christmas Tree"	Johnny Marks	2:18
12.	"White Christmas"	Irving Berlin	3:30
13.	"Silent Night"	Franz Xaver Gruber, Joseph Mohr	3:30
14.	"Stille Nacht"	Franz Xaver Gruber, Joseph Mohr	4:02
