= We Are Love =

Studio album by Il Volo
- Released: 19 November 2012
- Genre: Pop; pop-opera; pop rock
- Length: 48:17
- Language: Italian, English, Spanish
- Label: Geffen
- Producer: Humberto Gatica, Tony Renis, Michele Torpedine

Il Volo chronology
Il Volo Takes Flight (2012)	We Are Love (2012)	Buon Natale: The Christmas Album (2013)

We Are Love is the second studio album by Italian operatic pop trio Il Volo, released by Geffen Records on 19 November 2012.

It was released in Spanish speaking countries as Más Que Amor.

== Track listing ==
No.	Title	Writer(s)	Length
1.	"Questo amore"	Diane Warren, Marco Marinangeli	4:34
2.	"L'ultima volta"	Max Calo, Raffaele Di Pietro	3:33
3.	"I Bring You to My Senses"	Diane Warren	4:04
4.	"Beautiful Day"	Adam Clayton, David Howell Evans, Paul David Hewson, Larry Mullen, Jr.	3:16
5.	"Splendida"	Jörgen Elofsson, Marco Marinangeli, William Ross	4:19
6.	"Historia de un amor"	Carlos Eleta Almarán	3:54
7.	"Luna nascosta" (Love Theme from the Movie Hidden Moon)	Luis Bacalov, Humberto Gatica, Massimo Guantini, Tony Renis
8.	"Il canto" (feat. Plácido Domingo)	Luca Barbarossa, Romano Musumarra	4:28
9.	"We Are Love"	Edgar Cortázar, Mark Portmann	4:30
10.	"Così" (feat. Eros Ramazzotti)	Luca Chiaravalli, Eros Ramazzotti	4:15
11.	"Bienvenido nuestro amor"	Edgar Cortázar, Mark Portmann	3:42
12.	"Non farmi aspettare"	Emiliano Cecere, Saverio Grandi	4:03
Total length:			48:17

Más Que Amor
No.	Title	Writer(s)	Length
1.	"Más Que Amor"	Edgar Cortázar, Mark Portman	4:32
2.	"Constantemente Mía"	Edgar Cortázar, Mark Portmann, Diane Warren	4:03
3.	"L'ultima volta"	Max Calo, Raffaele Di Pietro	3:33
4.	"Historia de un amor"	Carlos Eleta Almarán	3:54
5.	"Bienvenido nuestro amor"	Edgar Cortázar, Mark Portmann	3:42
6.	"Así" (feat. Eros Ramazzotti)	Luca Chiaravalli, Eros Ramazzotti	4:15
7.	"Beautiful Day"	Adam Clayton, David Howell Evans, Paul David Hewson, Larry Mullen, Jr.	3:16
8.	"Luna escondida" (Love Theme from the Movie Hidden Moon)	Luis Bacalov, Humberto Gatica, Massimo Guantini, Tony Renis	3:39
9.	"Il canto" (feat. Plácido Domingo)	Luca Barbarossa, Romano Musumarra	4:28
10.	"Non farmi aspettare"	Emiliano Cecere, Saverio Grandi	3:58
11.	"Esplendida"	Jörgen Elofsson, Marco Marinangeli, William Ross, Claudia Brant	4:18
12.	"Nuestro amor"	Diane Warren, Marco Marinangeli	4:35
13.	"Constantemente Mía" (featuring Belinda)	Edgar Cortázar, Mark Portmann, Diane Warren	4:05
Total length:			52:17

== Charts ==
=== Weekly charts ===
Chart (2012–15)	Peak position
Belgian Albums (Ultratop Wallonia)	136
Dutch Albums (Album Top 100)	57
French Albums (SNEP)	189
Italian Albums (FIMI)	46
US Billboard 200	100
US Top Classical Albums (Billboard)	3
US Top Latin Albums (Billboard) Más Que Amor	2
US Latin Pop Albums (Billboard) Más Que Amor	1

=== Year-end charts ===
Chart (2013)	Position
US Top Classical Albums (Billboard)	8
US Top Classical Albums (Billboard) Más Que Amor	15
US Top Latin Albums (Billboard) Más Que Amor	15

Chart (2014)	Position
US Top Classical Albums (Billboard) Más Que Amor	31
US Top Latin Albums (Billboard) Más Que Amor	73

== Certifications ==
Region	Certification	Certified units/sales
Mexico (AMPROFON)	Gold	30,000^{^}
^{^} Shipments figures based on certification alone.
