= Grande amore =

2015 song by Il Volo

Single by Il Volo

from the album Sanremo grande amore & Grande Amore
- Language: Italian
- Released: 12 February 2015
- Recorded: 2014
- Genre: Operatic pop
- Length: 3:45 (original version); 3:00 (ESC version)
- Label: Sony Music Italy
- Songwriters: Francesco Boccia; Ciro Esposito
- Producers: Celso Valli; Michele Torpedine

Il Volo singles chronology
"El Triste" (2013)	"Grande amore" (2015)	"L'amore si muove" (2015)

Music video
- "Grande amore" on YouTube

Eurovision Song Contest 2015 entry
- Country: Italy
- Artists: Piero Barone; Ignazio Boschetto; Gianluca Ginoble
- As: Il Volo
- Language: Italian
- Composers: Francesco Boccia; Ciro Esposito
- Lyricists: Francesco Boccia; Ciro Esposito

Finals performance
- Final result: 3rd
- Final points: 292

Entry chronology
- ◄ "La mia città" (2014)
- "No Degree of Separation" (2016) ►

Official performance video
- "Grande amore" (final) on YouTube

"Grande amore" (pronounced [ˈɡrande aˈmoːre]; English: Great love) is a song performed by Italian operatic pop trio Il Volo –Piero Barone, Ignazio Boschetto, and Gianluca Ginoble–, with music composed and Italian lyrics written by Francesco Boccia and Ciro "Tommy" Esposito. The song won the Sanremo Music Festival 2015 and represented Italy in the Eurovision Song Contest 2015 where it placed third –winning the televoting and coming sixth with the juries–. Il Volo also released the song in Spanish and English versions.

== Background ==
=== Composition ===
The song was written in 2003 by the singer Francesco Boccia, and composed by Ciro "Tommy" Esposito (member of the Italian band Il Giardino dei Semplici), with an idea to make it performed by classical music singers. It was performed by Boccia himself and proposed for the Sanremo Music Festival in 2005, but it was rejected because it was considered too old-fashioned. Boccia, along with Gianfranco Caliendo, former frontman and lead vocalist of Il Giardino dei Semplici, had already penned and scored an international hit with the popular song "Turuturu" (2001), which sold over 1.2 million copies in the world in its various versions.

"Grande amore" was shelved for ten more years, and again proposed for the "Newcomers" section in the Sanremo Music Festival 2015, to be performed by duo Operapop –formed by Francesca Carli and Enrico Giovagnoli–, but their participation was denied due to festival's age restriction. It was also proposed to be performed by Orietta Berti, who although praised the song, refused because she wasn't available to participate in the festival.

Carlo Conti, artistic director and main presenter of that 65th edition of the festival, was not satisfied with the first proposed song by the trio Il Volo, and after hearing the song "Grande amore", recommended to the song's editor Pasquale Mammaro (manager of Operapop) to contact manager Michele Torpedine and assign it to them.

=== Lyrics ===
The song lyrics were not supposed to be changed, but on the behalf and desires by the trio, two verses were changed; "regina dei giorni miei" (queen of my days) became "respiro dei giorni miei" (breath of my days), and "sotto al tuo portone" (under your doorway) became "senza più timore" (without more fear). The lyrics were changed because as the original version refers to the serenade singing by a lover under the balcony to his lady, the trio felt it was too old style for their young age.

The song is not addressed to an actual person, but it's an idea of declaration of always valid love.

=== Sanremo Music Festival ===
Il Volo performed the song for the first time during the Sanremo Music Festival on 11 February 2015. During the final night of the song contest, held on 14 February 2015, "Grande amore" finished in first place, receiving 39.05% of votes on the last round of the competition, beating the remaining top three entries, "Fatti avanti amore" by Nek (35.38%) and "Adesso e qui (nostalgico presente)" by Malika Ayane (25.66%). According to the final voting results, Il Volo won mostly thanks to the televotes (40% of the final voting results share), receiving 56.1878% of votes, while only 22.9167% of votes by the experts jury (3rd), and 32.3333% of votes by the popular jury (2nd). During Il Volo's performances, the Sanremo Festival Orchestra was directed by Carolina Bubbico.

As the festival was used by Radiotelevisione italiana (RAI) to select its song and performer for the 60th edition of the Eurovision Song Contest, Il Volo became the performers for the contest. On 19 February 2015, RAI confirmed "Grande amore" as its entrant for Eurovision.

=== Eurovision Song Contest ===
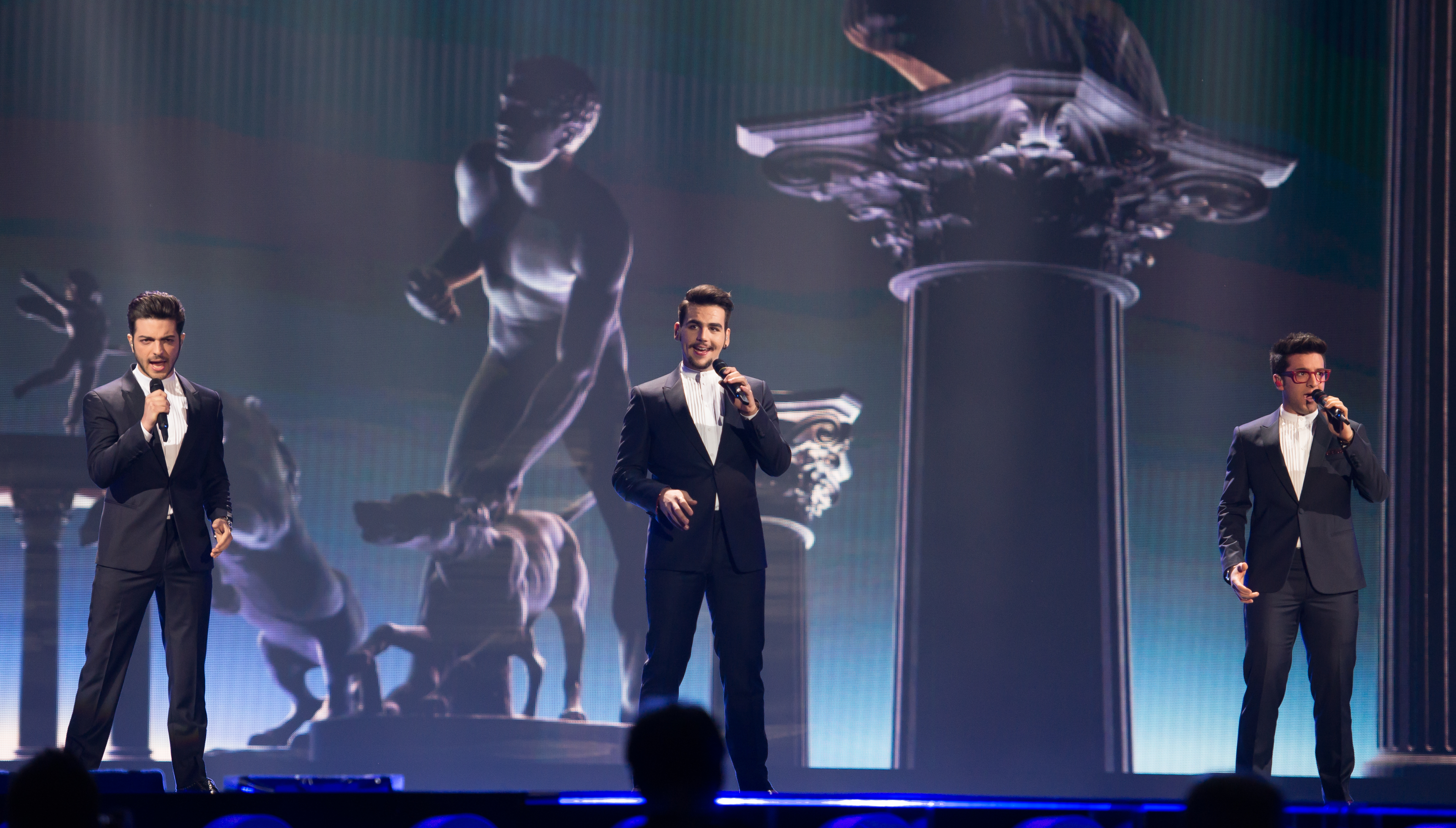
Il Volo performing "Grande amore" in Eurovision.

On 23 May 2015, the grand final of the Eurovision Song Contest was held in the Wiener Stadthalle in Vienna hosted by Österreichischer Rundfunk (ORF) and broadcast live throughout the continent. Since Italy was part of the "Big Five", it automatically qualified for the final. Il Volo performed "Grande amore" as the last song in the running order. For the song to participate in the contest, it was necessary to shorten it to fit into three minutes.

At the close of voting, the song came first on televoting and third overall. It also won the Marcel Bezençon Press Award for Best Song, awarded by the accredited international press.

=== Aftermath ===
On 12 May 2022, in the Eurovision Song Contest 2022 held in Turin, Il Volo performed "Grande amore" as an interval act at the second semi-final.

== Personnel ==
- Celso Valli - Arrangements, production, orchestra conductor, piano, keyboards
- Mattia Tedesco - guitars
- Cesare Chiodo - electric bass
- Paolo Valli - drums
- Stefano Bussoli - timpani

== Versions ==
Il Volo released two additional versions of the song: a Spanish-language version on 10 July 2015, and an English-language version titled as "You Are My Everything (Grande Amore)" on 11 May 2022.

== Charts and certifications ==
=== Weekly charts ===
Chart (2015)	Peak position
Austria (Ö3 Austria Top 40)	5
Belgium (Ultratip Bubbling Under Flanders)	1
Belgium (Ultratop 50 Wallonia)	44
Finland (Suomen virallinen lista)	25
France (SNEP)	145
Germany (GfK)	54
Greece (Greece Digital Songs)	1
Iceland (RÚV)	7
Italy (FIMI)	1
Slovenia (SloTop50)	40
Spain (Promusicae)	24
Sweden Heatseekers (Sverigetopplistan)	1
Switzerland (Schweizer Hitparade)	19
US Classical Digital Songs (Billboard)	6

=== Year-end charts ===
Chart (2015)	Position
Italy (FIMI)	34

=== Certifications ===
Region	Certification	Certified units/sales
Italy (FIMI)	2× Platinum	100,000^{‡}
^{‡} Sales+streaming figures based on certification alone.
