= Giovanni Capurro =

Italian poet

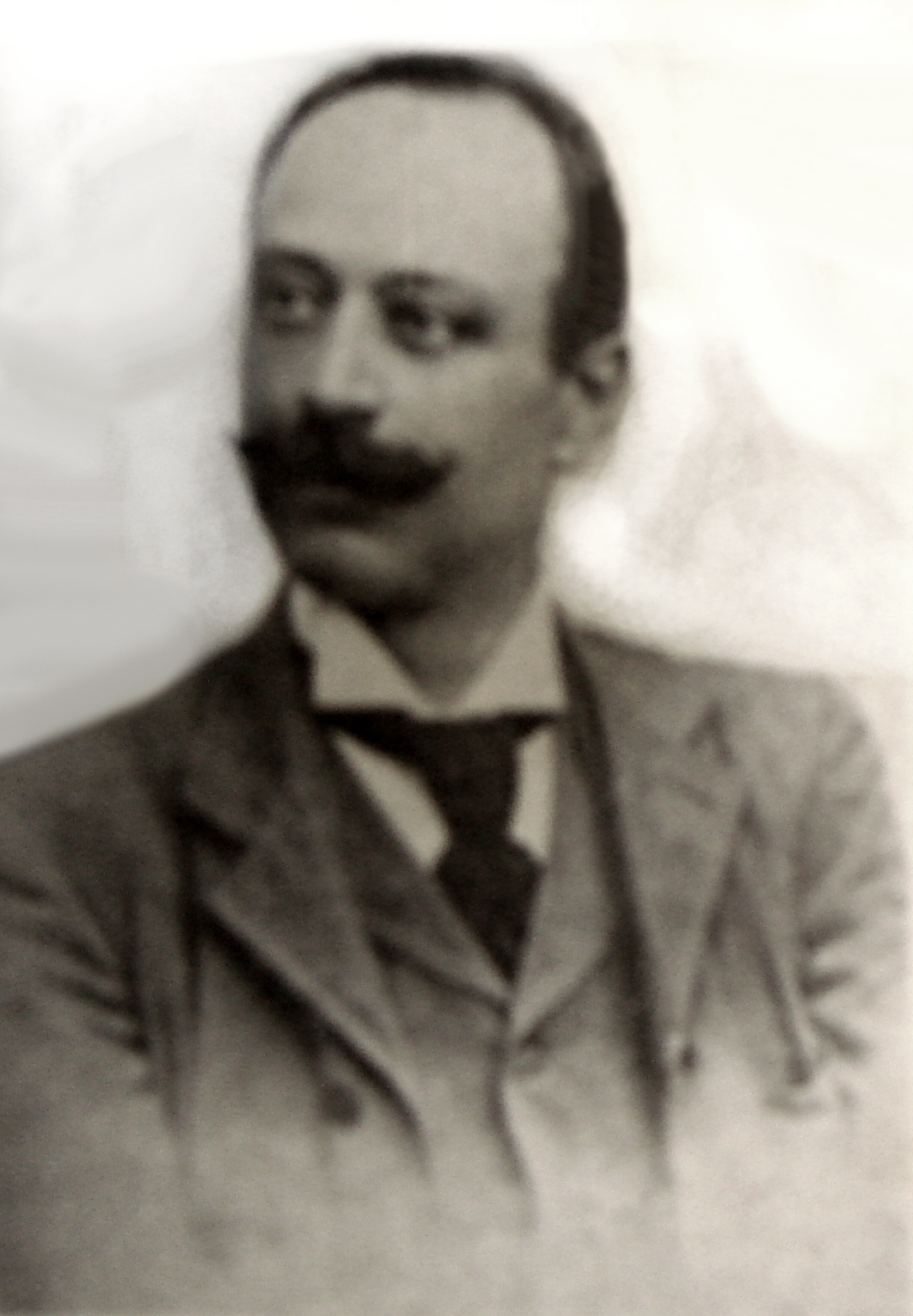
Portrait of Giovanni Capurro

Giovanni Capurro (5 February 1859 – 18 January 1920) was an Italian poet, best remembered today as the co-creator, with singer/composer Eduardo Di Capua, of the world famous song, "'O sole mio".

Capurro was born in Naples. He made his living as a poet and playwright. He is considered to be among the finest nineteenth-century Italian poets. The actor Viviani gave his first performance in an established theatre, the Teatro Perella in Basso Porto, in The Street Urchin, a sketch by Capurro.

In 1898, Giovanni Capurro wrote the words to 'O Sole mio and asked Eduardo Di Capua (who at the time was in Odessa with his orchestra-violinist father) to set it to music. The song was later presented at Piedigrotta 1898, organized by the Round Table promoted by the publisher Bideri, and came in second place after a piece called Napule Bello!. But in popular appeal, this result was quickly overturned. 'O Sole mio became famous. Even so, it made little money for its creators.

Capurro lived in financial scarcity his entire life. An artist for art's sake, he was not concerned about receiving credit for his best-known creation. For thirty years he was associated with the newspaper Rome as a reporter, drama critic, and, late in life, as an administrative employee. Capurro was a devotee of lounges where he sang, played the piano and did amusing imitations.

Capurro died in 1920; some sources say in Naples while others say Mexico City.
