= Il Volo =

Italian operatic pop trio

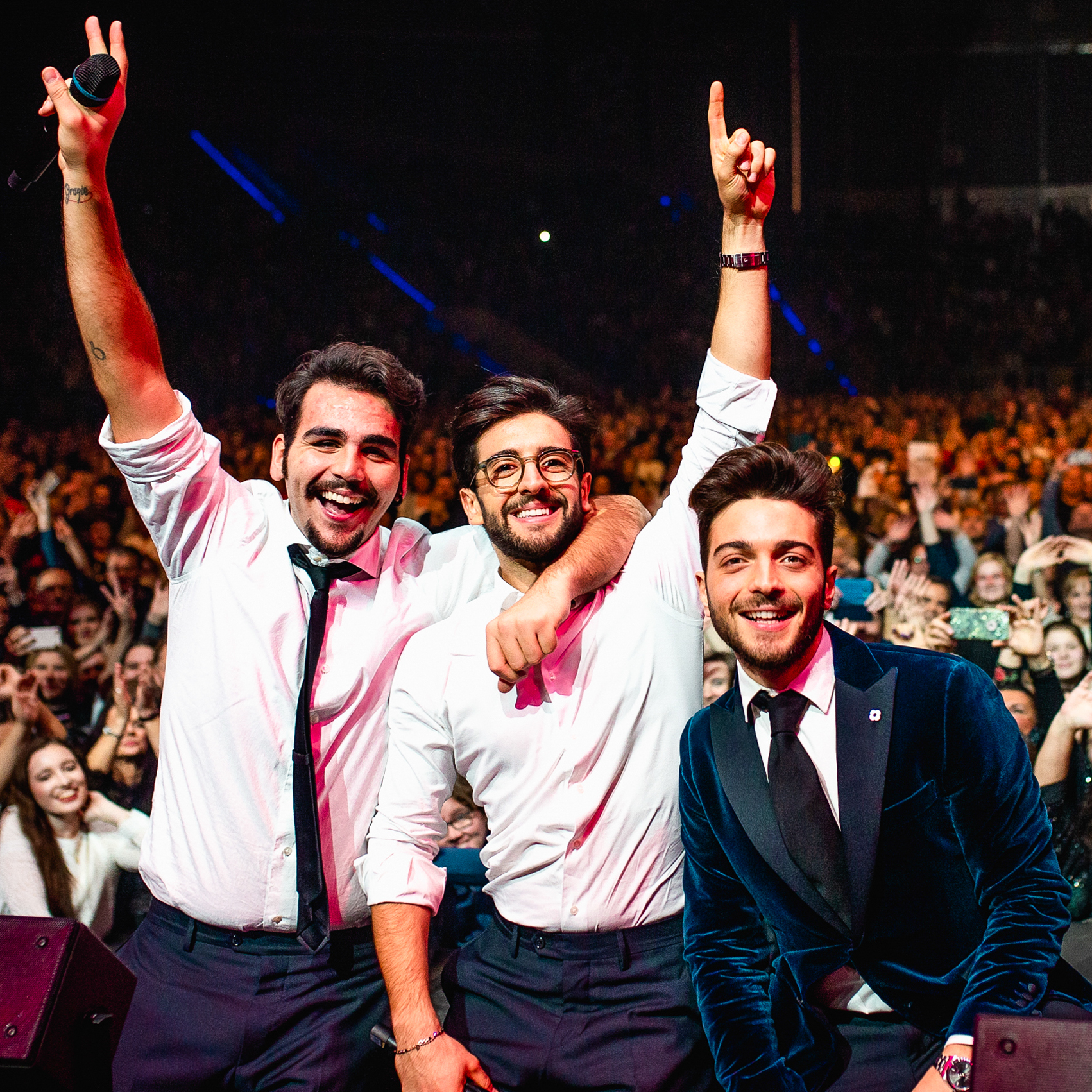
- Il Volo during a concert at the Atlas Arena in Łódź, Poland, 2018. L–R: Boschetto, Barone and Ginoble.

Background information
- Origin: Italy
- Genres: Operatic pop; classical crossover
- Years active: 2010–present
- Labels: Geffen; Universal/Interscope; Sony Music Latin
- Members: Piero Barone; Ignazio Boschetto; Gianluca Ginoble
- Website: ilvolomusic.com

logo

Il Volo (pronounced [il ˈvoːlo]; transl. 'The Flight') is an Italian operatic pop trio, consisting of Gianluca Ginoble, Piero Barone, and Ignazio Boschetto. They describe their music as "popera". Having won the Sanremo Music Festival 2015, they represented Italy in the Eurovision Song Contest 2015 with the song "Grande amore", finishing first in the televote and third overall.

== History ==
=== Beginning (Ti lascio una canzone) (2009–2010) ===
In 2009, Piero Barone, Ignazio Boschetto and Gianluca Ginoble were among the teens competing in the Italian televised singing competition Ti lascio una canzone, held at the Teatro Ariston in Sanremo and broadcast by Rai 1. During the first episodes, they performed several songs as solo artists. Among the others, Gianluca Ginoble's rendition of "Il mare calmo della sera", originally by Andrea Bocelli, won the first episode of the show, and later came in first place during the final held on 2 May 2009. Director and creator of the show, Roberto Cenci, had the idea to put them together, with the purpose to create a trio similar to The Three Tenors (Plácido Domingo, José Carreras and Luciano Pavarotti). During the fourth episode of the show, they performed together for the first time, singing Neapolitan classic song "'O sole mio". While in Los Angeles, Italian singer-songwriter and music producer Tony Renis casually discovered their performance through Rai International. Impressed by the trio, he decided to call Cenci to arrange a meeting with them. Since they were under the age of 18, Cenci talked with the singers' families, and they decided to trust Renis' proposal to work with him. Thanks to lawyer Peter Lopez, Renis met with Geffen Records' Jimmy Iovine and Ron Fair and they offered a recording deal to the group, which allowed them to become the first Italian artists to directly sign with an American recording label. Producer Michele Torpedine started to work with them as a manager.

The group was initially named "I Tre Tenorini", but their name was later changed to "The Tryo". With this name, in 2010 the group participated in the charity single "We Are the World 25 for Haiti", a remake of the 1985 hit song "We Are the World". In February of the same year, they also performed the songs "Granada" and "Un amore così grande" for Queen Rania of Jordan during the 60th Sanremo Music Festival. In late 2010, their name was finally changed into "Il Volo" (English: the flight)

=== Il Volo (2010–2012) ===
Il Volo began working on their first studio album in 2010, recorded at Abbey Road Studios in London and produced by Tony Renis and Humberto Gatica. The eponymously titled album largely covers international and Italian standards, including "Il mondo", "Un amore così grande", "’O sole mio", "El reloj" and Charlie Chaplin's "Smile", but also features original songs written by Diane Warren and Walter Afanasieff. Released in Italy on 30 November 2010, it peaked at number 6 on the Italian Albums Chart, and was later certified platinum by the Federation of the Italian Music Industry.

The international edition of the album was released in the United States by Geffen Records on 12 April 2011, and was promoted with a performance during the final three results show of American Idol's tenth season, as well as with appearances on The Tonight Show, Good Morning America, The Ellen DeGeneres Show and The Early Show. The lead single from the album in the United States was "’O sole mio". During its first week, Il Volo reached the tenth spot of Billboard 200 and topped the Classical Albums chart, with sales of 23,000 copies. The album also entered the top ten in other countries, including Belgium, France, Germany, New Zealand and the Netherlands, and it peaked at number one on the Ö3 Austria Albums Chart.

The Spanish version of the album Il Volo (Edición en Español) was released in June 2011. The record achieved commercial success in Mexico, peaking at number six and being certified platinum by the Asociación Mexicana de Productores de Fonogramas y Videogramas, as well as in the United States, where it topped the Billboard Latin Pop Albums chart and it received the RIAA Latin gold certification, denoting shipments in excess of 50,000 units in the country. This also allowed the group to receive two nominations at the 12th Latin Grammy Awards, in the categories Best New Artist and Best Pop Album by a Duo or Group with Vocals, for the album Il Volo (Edición en Español).

The trio performed for the TV show The Talk in February 2011 and on 13 October 2011. On 31 July 2011, the trio performed "’O sole mio" and "This Time" for the President's Star Charity show in Singapore to help raise funds for the handicapped. On 4 September 2011, the trio performed "’O sole mio" and "Smile" for the MDA Labor Day Telethon. On 11 September 2011, the trio made a cameo appearance on the series finale of Entourage.

Il Volo performed live at the Detroit Opera House on 27 October 2011, later released as their first concert DVD.

The group's EP Christmas Favorites, featuring a track with Pia Toscano, was released 21 November 2011. On the same date, their début album was reissued in a special Christmas edition augmented with the Christmas Favourites EP. Il Volo performed as the closing guest for The Tonight Show with Jay Leno on 22 December 2011, singing "The Christmas Song".

The Detroit Opera House recording Il Volo Takes Flight aired 7 December 2011 on local PBS station WTVS, with the CD/DVD release 28 February 2012. The concert aired on PBS stations across the US and Canada, and the group toured the countries beginning that August. In October and early November 2012, the group performed with Barbra Streisand during the North American leg of her Barbra Live tour. They joined her onstage for the songs "Smile" and "Make Our Garden Grow", and performed singles "O Sole Mio" and "Un Amore Cosi Grande".

=== We Are Love (2012–2013) ===
On 19 November 2012 Il Volo released their second album, We Are Love (Billboard 200 number 100), which include 12 tracks in three different languages (Italian, English and Spanish) and duets with Plácido Domingo and with Italian pop singer Eros Ramazzotti. The album contains eight unreleased songs, written by Diane Warren, Luis Bacalov and Latin Grammy winner Edgar Cortazar among others, and four covers. It also includes the theme song of film Hidden Moon, "Luna Nascosta", that Il Volo recorded in 2012. "Luna Nascosta" was selected by the Academy among the seventy-five songs in the running for nominations in the Original Song category for the 2013 Oscars.

On 28 November 2012 Il Volo performed at the 80th annual Christmas at Rockefeller Center tree lighting in New York, which was broadcast live nationwide on NBC, and on 11 December they performed at the 2012 Nobel Peace Prize Concert in Oslo, Norway, with King Harald V in attendance, singing "Il Mondo" and album title track "We Are Love".

They released Más Que Amor on 9 April 2013, a Spanish version of We Are Love that includes an additional duet with Mexican singer Belinda. The album débuted at number 1 on the Billboard Latin Pop Albums and peaked at number 2 on the Billboard Top Latin Albums. Más Que Amor was certified Gold in Mexico and Argentina.

On 25 April 2013, they performed the song "El Triste" at the 2013 Latin Billboard Music Awards as a tribute to singer José José.

On 16 June Il Volo performed "Más Que Amor" during the "In Memoriam" tribute of the 40th Daytime Emmy Awards. On 11 July 2013 they sang the national anthem of United States before the game between the Colorado Rockies and the Los Angeles Dodgers at Dodger Stadium in Los Angeles.

=== Buon Natale – The Christmas Album (2013–2014) ===
On 26 October 2013, they released the international version of Buon Natale: The Christmas Album, which includes some of the most popular American Christmas songs, as well as two songs in Latin, one in Spanish and one in German, and duets with Pia Toscano and Belinda. The album debuted at number 1 on the Billboard Holiday Albums and peaked at number 1 on the Billboard Classical Albums chart. The single "O Holy Night" peaked at number 27 on the Billboard Adult Contemporary chart. In November, a special Italian edition was released, including songs "Bianco Natale" and "Astro del ciel". Rolling Stone published on its website a cappella performances of three tracks, "O Holy Night", "White Christmas" and "Santa Claus is Coming to Town".

In February 2014, the trio received two nominations at the 2014 Latin Billboard Music Awards, as Top Latin Albums Artist of the Year, Duo or Group and Latin Pop Albums Artist of the Year, Duo or Group. The awards show took place at the BankUnited Center of Miami on 24 April, and broadcast live by Telemundo. During the evening Il Volo is awarded as Best Group of the year in Latin Pop Albums category and won El Pulso Social award, as artist who has dominated interactions on social networking sites during the Billboard Awards. The group also presented the Latin Pop Songs artist of the Year, Duo or Group award.

During 2014 the group focused on the preparation of a new album (Musica Che Resta is the current one in 2020), set to be released in 2015. In June they returned to North America for a series of 15 concerts in United States and Canada, accompanied by a band and an orchestra. The set list traced their career, including the most successful songs of their repertoire, and the tour gets very positive reviews from critics. In July and September they toured in Italy for first time.

On 21 August 2014, Il Volo are awarded as Dúo or Grupo Favorito in the Premios Tu Mundo. The awards celebrates the Latin pop culture in the United States and are broadcast live by Telemundo.

On 14 December 2014, Il Volo are announced as one of the participants in the 2015 Sanremo Music Festival (10–14 February 2015), with the unreleased song Grande amore. On 21 December 2014, they performed at the traditional Christmas Concert in the Italian Senate, in front of the highest offices of state, accompanied by a choir of children with hearing disabilities who perform the songs with sign language. At the end of the concert, the President of the Republic Giorgio Napolitano and the President of Senate Pietro Grasso praised the group.

=== Sanremo grande amore, Eurovision Song Contest, and Notte Magica (2015–2018) ===
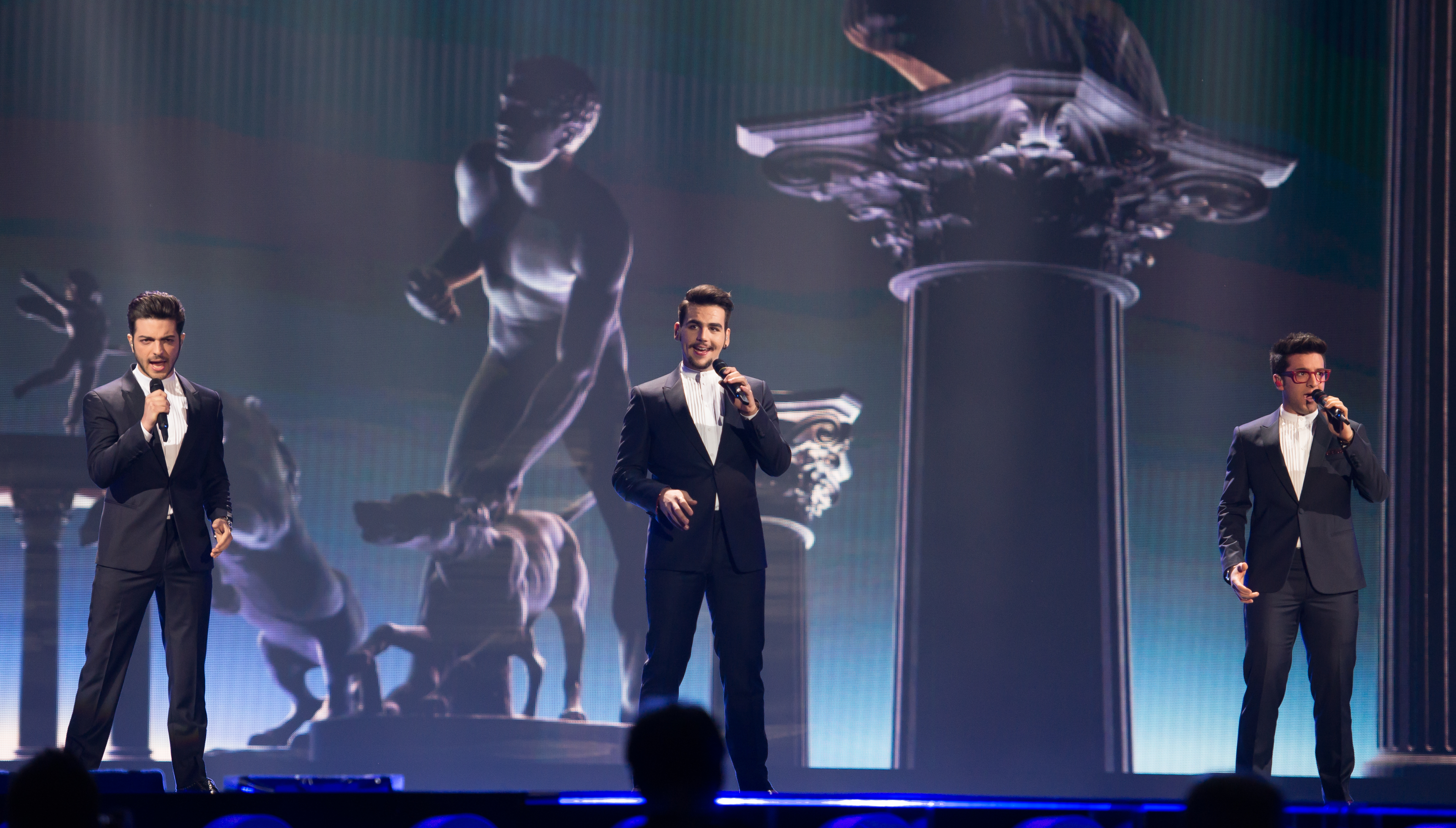
Eurovision 2015

On 14 February 2015, they took part in the Sanremo Music Festival 2015, winning 39.05% of the total vote over the 2 leading challengers. The win gave the group the opportunity to represent Italy at the Eurovision Song Contest 2015. As Italy is a member of the Big Five, the group went straight in to the Grand Final of the Eurovision Song Contest, held in Vienna on 23 May 2015. Grande Amore came 3rd with 292 points - winning the televote with 366 points - and won the Marcel Bezençon Press Award, as best song according to the collective voting of the accredited press. The extended play Sanremo grande amore was released in Italy on 20 February 2015 and was certified triple platinum by FIMI.

Their fourth studio album was released worldwide on 25 September 2015 by Sony Music Latin, in three different versions: an International version and a Spanish release Grande Amore, and an Italian version L'amore si muove. The album is composed of original songs and covers of international and Italian standards and it was produced by Emilio Estefan, Celso Valli, Cheche Alara and Michele Torpedine. It peaked at number 1 in Italy and on the Billboard Top Classical Albums and on the Billboard Latin Pop Albums chart. It was certified double platinum for more than 100,000 copies sold by FIMI.

Il Volo was part of the 2015 Columbus Day Parade in New York City.

On 30 September 2016, the group together with Placido Domingo released Notte Magica - A Tribute to the Three Tenors. The live album features many of the songs performed by The Three Tenors (Domingo, Pavarotti and Carreras) for their iconic concert held on the eve of the Italia '90 World Cup.

On 4 March 2017 they debuted at the Radio City Music Hall in New York "Notte Magica – A Tribute to the Three Tenors" that will tour in the most important cities of the United States of America, in Italy, Europe and Latin America.

The first date was held in Firenze their concert at the Baths of Caracalla, materialized in an album and a world tour that debuted on 1 July in Piazza Santa Croce in Florence.

=== Sanremo Festival, Musica, and The Best of 10 Years (2019–present) ===
They took part in the 2019 Sanremo Music Festival with the song "Musica che resta". The piece, written and composed by Gianna Nannini, Emilio Munda, Piero Romitelli, Pasquale Mammaro and Antonello Carozza, ranking in third place. On 22 February 2019, Il Volo released their fifth studio album, Musica, worldwide. Later that year on 8 November, they released their compilation album, Il Volo: The Best of 10 Years, to celebrate their tenth anniversary of their career. The group has also embarked on a world tour, which kicked off in May 2019 in Japan, continued in Latin America beginning on 3 October, and arrived in North America the next year on 28 January 2020.

On 5 June 2021, they held a concert in the Arena of Verona in honor of the Italian composer Ennio Morricone, and subsequently released the tribute album Il Volo Sings Morricone in November 2021.

Il Volo competed in the Sanremo Festival in 2024 with the song "Capolavoro".

In Japan, the group gained further popularity following figure skater Yuzuru Hanyu's use of their song "Notte Stellata (The Swan)" in his exhibition program. Following his performance at the 2018 Winter Olympics, interest in the group increased among Japanese audiences, with fans calling for their return to the country. In November 2026, it was announced that Il Volo would appear as special guests at Hanyu's Notte Stellata 2027 ice show, scheduled to take place from 12 to 14 March 2027 at Sekisui Heim Super Arena in Miyagi, Japan, marking their first live collaboration.

== Members ==
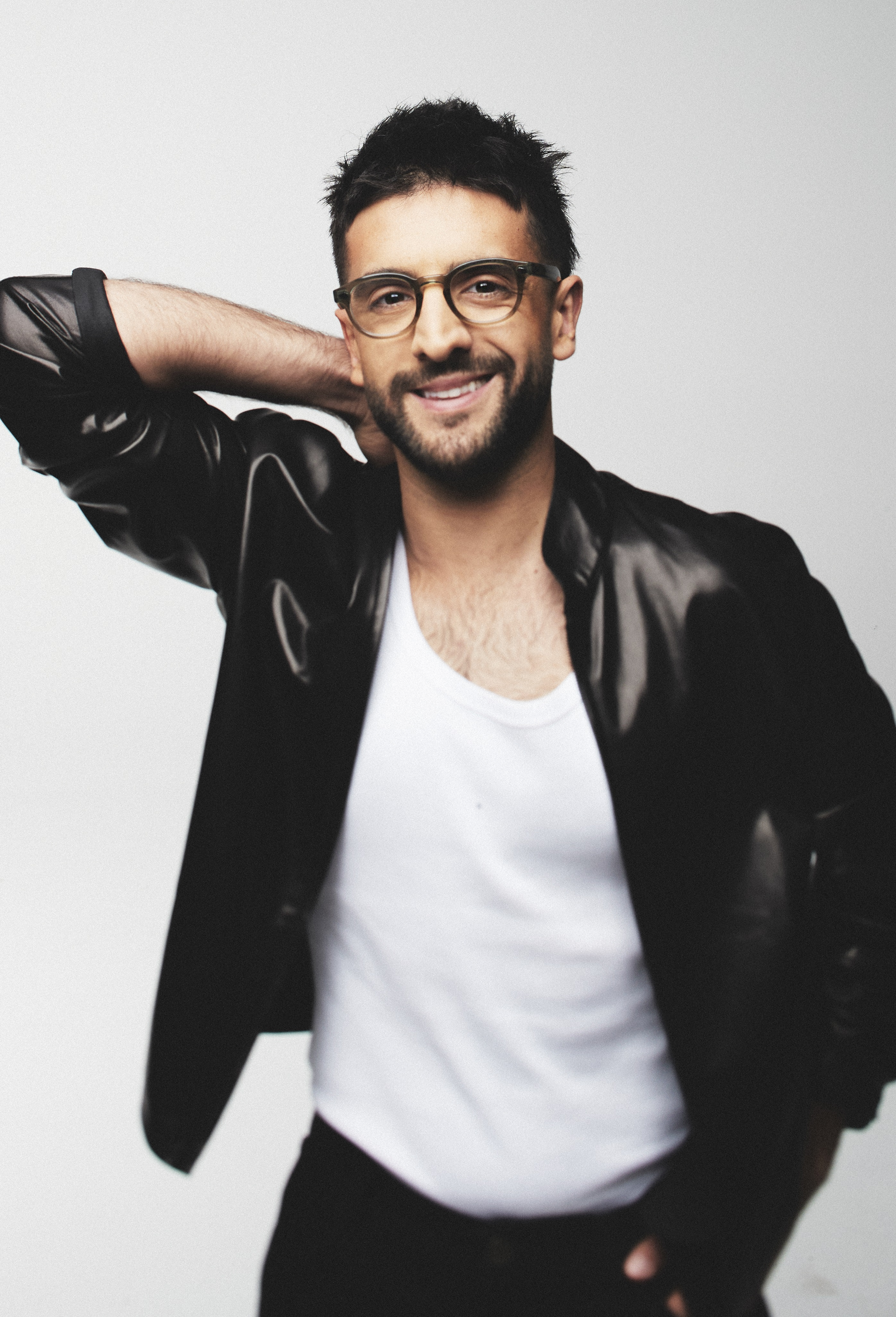
Piero Barone

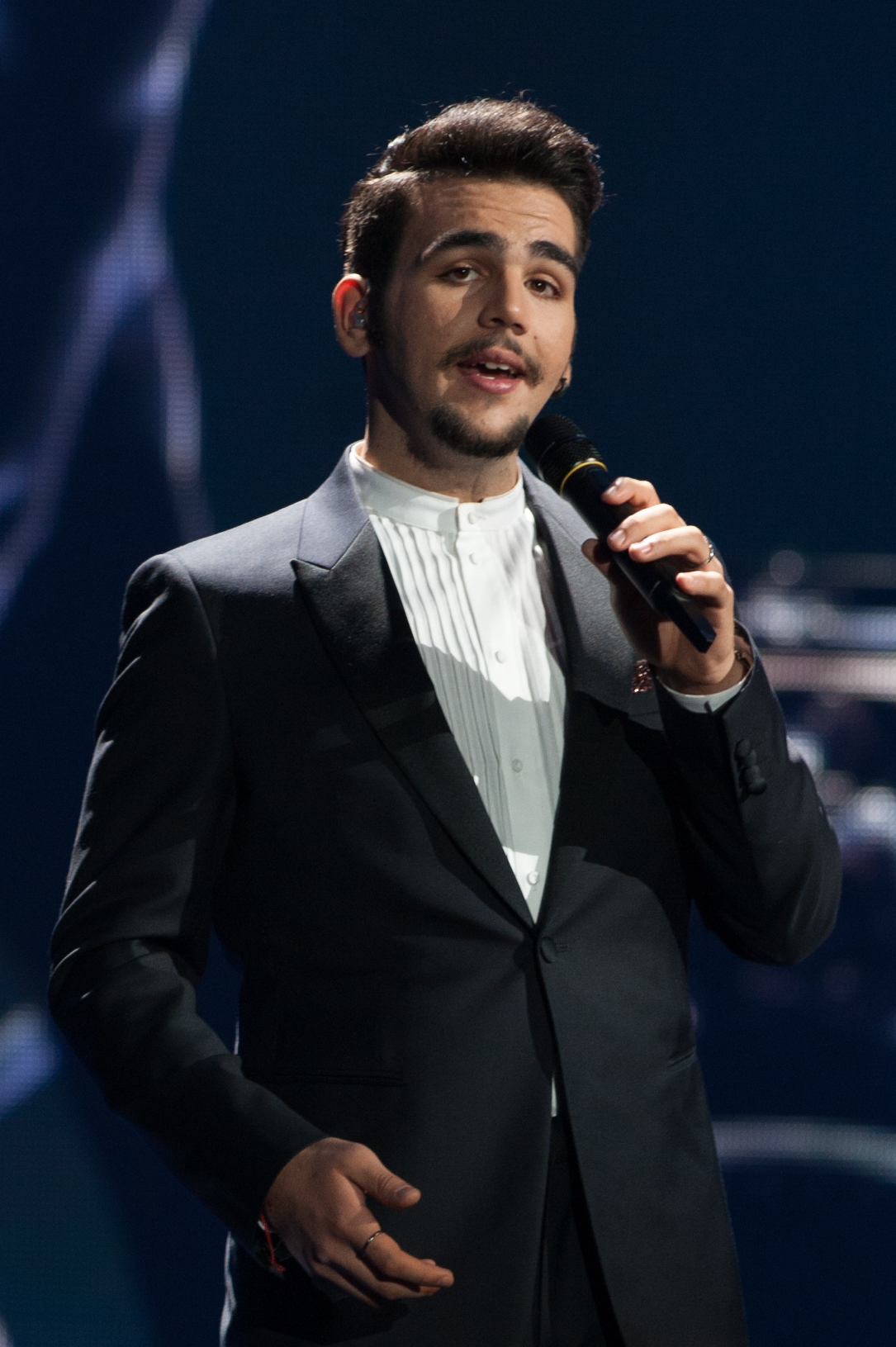
Ignazio Boschetto

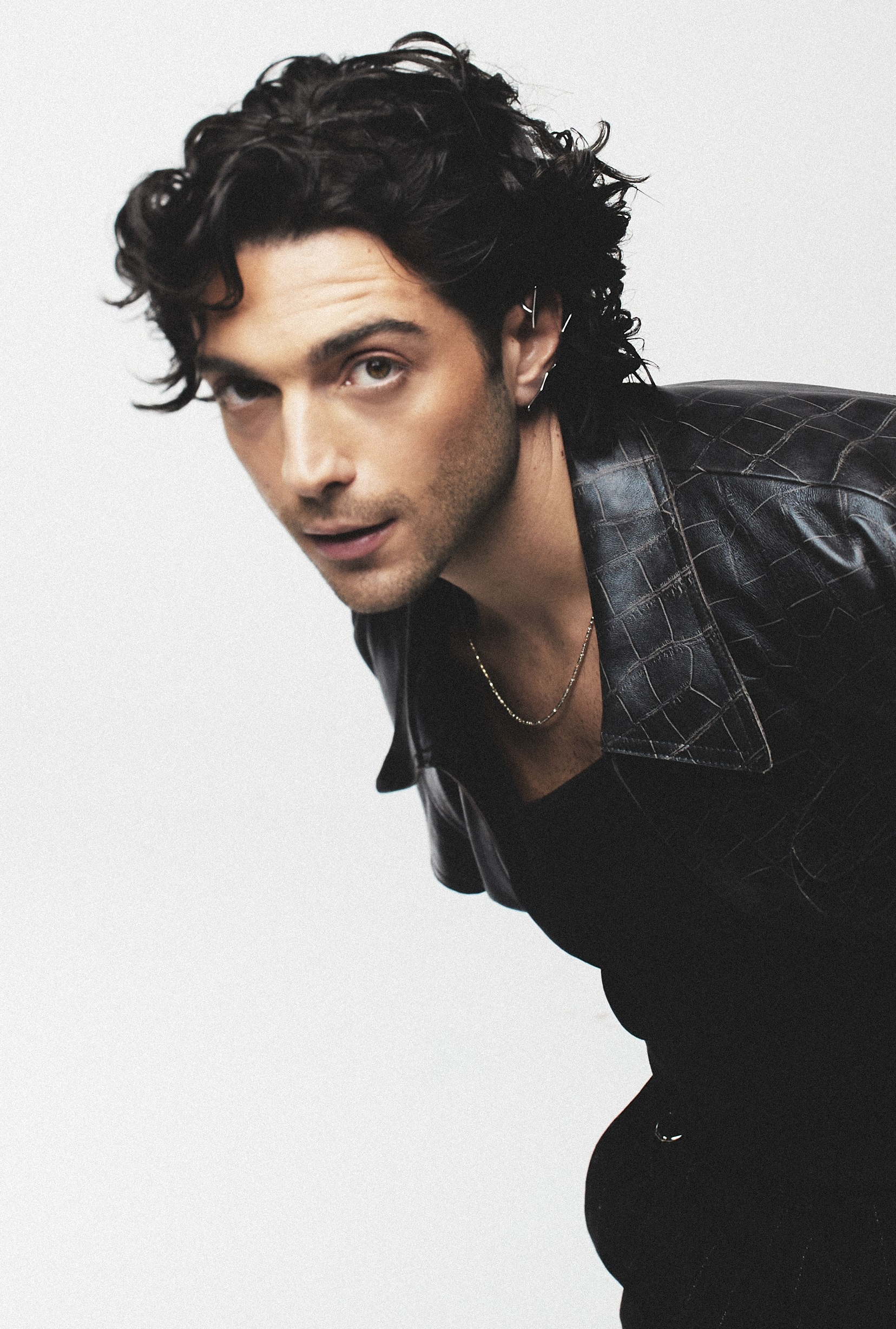
Gianluca Ginoble
- Piero Barone (born 24 June 1993 in Naro, Agrigento, Sicily) is a Spinto tenor demonstrating a range from G♯_{2}–B_{4}. He has a dramatic sound while still easily reaching higher notes.
- Ignazio Boschetto (born 4 October 1994 in Bologna, Emilia-Romagna, to Sicilian parents from Marsala and Petrosino) is a lyric tenor with a clear and bright timbre. He has demonstrated a range from G_{2}–E♭_{5}. He has also sung up to F_{6} in falsetto.
- Gianluca Ginoble (born 11 February 1995 in Roseto degli Abruzzi, Abruzzo under the full name of Gianluca Ginoble Di Vittorio) is a lyric baritone with a range from E_{2}–A_{4}. He has a warm timbre, very easily singing at the top of the baritone range, while also being able to sing very low notes.

== Discography ==
- Il Volo (2010)
- We Are Love (2012)
- Buon Natale: The Christmas Album (2013)
- Grande Amore // Grande Amore International Version // L'amore Si Muove (2015)
- Notte Magica: A Tribute to The Three Tenors (2016)
- Ámame (2018)
- Musica (2019)
- 10 Years - The Best Of (2019)
- IL VOLO SINGS MORRICONE (2021)
- TRES VOCES UN ALMA (2023)
- 4 Xmas (2023)
- Ad Astra // Ad Astra International (2024)

== Tours ==
- 2011 – Il Volo North American Tour 2011
- 2011 – Il Volo European Tour 2011
- 2012 – Il Volo South American Tour 2012
- 2012 – Il Volo Takes Flight Tour
- 2012 – Barbra Live – Special guests Chris Botti and Il Volo
- 2013 – We Are Love Tour
- 2013 – Más que amor Tour
- 2014 – US & Canada Summer Tour 2014
- 2016 – Grande amore Tour
- 2016 – L'amore si muove Tour
- 2017 – Notte magica Tour
- 2019 – Musica Tour
- 2020 – The Best of Ten Years Tour
- 2022 - Il Volo Sings Morricone US & Canada Tour
- 2023 - Il Volo live in Concert
- 2024/2025 - Il Volo World Tour Tutti per uno - Capolavoro

== Awards and nominations ==
=== Billboard Latin Music ===
Year	Nominee / work	Award	Result
2012	Il Volo	New Artist of the Year	Nominated
2012	Il Volo	Latin Pop Albums Artist of the Year, Duo or Group	Nominated
2013	Il Volo	Latin Pop Albums Artist of the Year, Duo or Group	Nominated
2014	Il Volo	Top Latin Albums Artist of the Year, Duo or Group	Nominated
2014	Il Volo	Latin Pop Albums Artist of the Year, Duo or Group	Won
2014	Il Volo	El Pulso Social	Won

=== Latin Grammy ===
Year	Nominee / work	Award	Result
2011	Il Volo	Best New Artist	Nominated
2011	Il Volo: Edición En Español	Best Pop Album By A Duo or Group with Vocal	Nominated

=== Other ===
Year	Award	Category	Recipient	Result
2011	Wind Music Awards	Premio Disco d'Oro	Il Volo	Won
2013	Diosas de Plata	Mejor Canción Original para Cine	"Luna Nascosta"	Won
2013	Premios Canacine	Mejor Canción de una Película Mexicana	"Luna Nascosta"	Nominated
2014	Premios Tu Mundo	Dúo o Grupo Favorito	Il Volo	Won
2014	World Music Awards	World's Best Album	Más Que Amor	Nominated
2014	World Music Awards	World's Best Group	Il Volo	Nominated
2014	World Music Awards	World's Best Live Act	Il Volo	Nominated
2015	Sanremo Music Festival	Campioni	"Grande amore"	Won
2015	Marcel Bezençon Awards	Press Award	"Grande amore"	Won
2015	Wind Music Awards	Premio CD Multiplatino	Sanremo grande amore	Won
2015	Premio PMI	Premio Artista Italiano nel Mondo	Il Volo	Won
2016	Wind Music Awards	Premio CD Multiplatino	L'amore si muove	Won
2017	Wind Music Awards	Premio Album Platino	Notte Magica - A Tribute to the Three Tenors	Won
2017	Wind Music Awards	Premio Live Oro	Notte Magica Tour	Won
2018	Wind Music Awards	Premio Live Platino	Notte Magica Tour	Won

== Controversy ==
=== Hotel Garni du Lac incident ===
On 29 September 2015, Italian media reported that Il Volo had trashed a room of the Hotel Garni du Lac, in Locarno, where they were staying. Apparently, the managers of the hotel had released some interviews to the German broadcast ZDF and later to the Italian media La Regione and Liberatv, complaining about the acts of vandalism the trio had put into place before leaving the premises. Allegedly, they stated that "objects, mattresses and laundry had been haphazardly thrown everywhere", and that "there was urine out of the toilet in the bathroom and the room walls had been smeared with fecal matter". Seemingly, the behaviour was to be explained with a sort of revenge for the room carpeting, to which the trio was allergic. Il Volo's press manager Danilo Ciotti commented the news immediately after stating that "it's true that they don't love carpeting because of allergies, but I don't believe they caused damages intentionally". Subsequently, Barbara D'Urso arranged a live meeting during the Italian TV broadcast Pomeriggio 5 between the director of the Hotel du Lac and Il Volo's press managers. The director denied all the statements attributed to him, clearly saying that all the story was fake news, resizing the events to some unmade beds and some pamphlets fallen from the desk in one of the rooms where the trio was staying.

=== Drug in Boschetto's drink ===
Boschetto revealed that he was drugged during a party after a concert in Miami, waking up on the grass without remembering anything. The singer found himself completely confused with no memory of the night before. Apparently, a friend of his died in a car accident after being in that same venue the following month.

== See also ==
- Enrico Caruso
- Luciano Pavarotti
- The Three Tenors
- Andrea Bocelli
- Il Divo

Awards and achievements
Preceded by Arisa with "Controvento"	Sanremo Music Festival winner 2015	Succeeded by Stadio with "Un giorno mi dirai"
Preceded by Emma Marrone with "La mia città"	Italy in the Eurovision Song Contest; 2015	Succeeded by Francesca Michielin with "No Degree of Separation"
