= Marco Marinangeli =

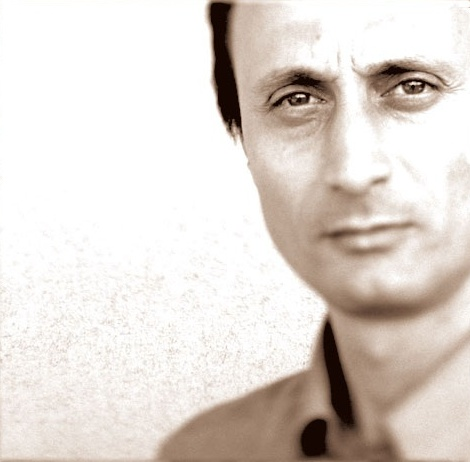

Background information
- Origin: Italy
- Genres: Pop, Rock, Latin, R&B, Jazz, Classical
- Occupations: Songwriter, Composer, Producer, Arranger
- Instruments: Piano, Vocals
- Years active: 1975–present

Marco Marinangeli is a Grammy-nominated Italian composer, songwriter, arranger, orchestrator and producer. He is the president of Magelic Productions, Inc., in Hollywood. He is a writer and producer of Josh Groban, Donna Summer, Plácido Domingo, The Tenors, The Cheetah Girls, China Anne McClain, Dove Cameron, Lucas Grabeel, Monique Coleman, Peter Frampton, Taylor Dayne, Kathie Lee Gifford, Myra, Olga Tañon, Miley Cyrus a.k.a. Hannah Montana, Hilary Duff, Solas, The Chieftains, Larry Carlton and George Perris. He has collaborated with David Foster, Humberto Gatica, William Ross (composer), Jeremy Lubbock, Luis Bacalov, Jorge Calandrelli and Lalo Schifrin.
