= Eduardo di Capua =

Italian singer-songwriter (1865–1917)

Eduardo di Capua (Naples, Italy, May 12, 1865 – Naples, October 3, 1917) was an Italian composer, singer and songwriter.

== Biography ==
Di Capua was born in Naples in 1865, and he is best known for having composed the song "'O Sole Mio".

In 1897, di Capua bought a collection of 23 melodies from an obscure composer, Alfredo Mazzucchi. He developed the music, and then invited the poet Giovanni Capurro to write lyrics for it. The resulting song has been recorded by many singers, both classical and popular, in both the original Neapolitan and in the English adaptation. His works on Neapolitan songs were published in the music magazine La Tavola Rotonda.

Di Capua also wrote "Marie, Ah Marie" ("O Marie" in English), another Neapolitan song. He died in 1917 in Naples.
