= Operatic pop =

Subgenre of pop music

- Other names: Popera, pop-opera
- Stylistic origins: Opera; pop
- Cultural origins: Early 20th century, United States

Other topics
- Orchestral pop; Operatic metal

Operatic pop, pop-opera or popera is a subgenre of pop music that is performed in an operatic singing style or a song, theme or motif from classical music stylized as pop. The subgenre is often performed by classical crossover singers and acts, although that field is much broader in the types of music it encompasses. Popera performances, such as those by the Three Tenors, have reached larger audiences and brought in greater profits than typical for operatic music.

== History ==
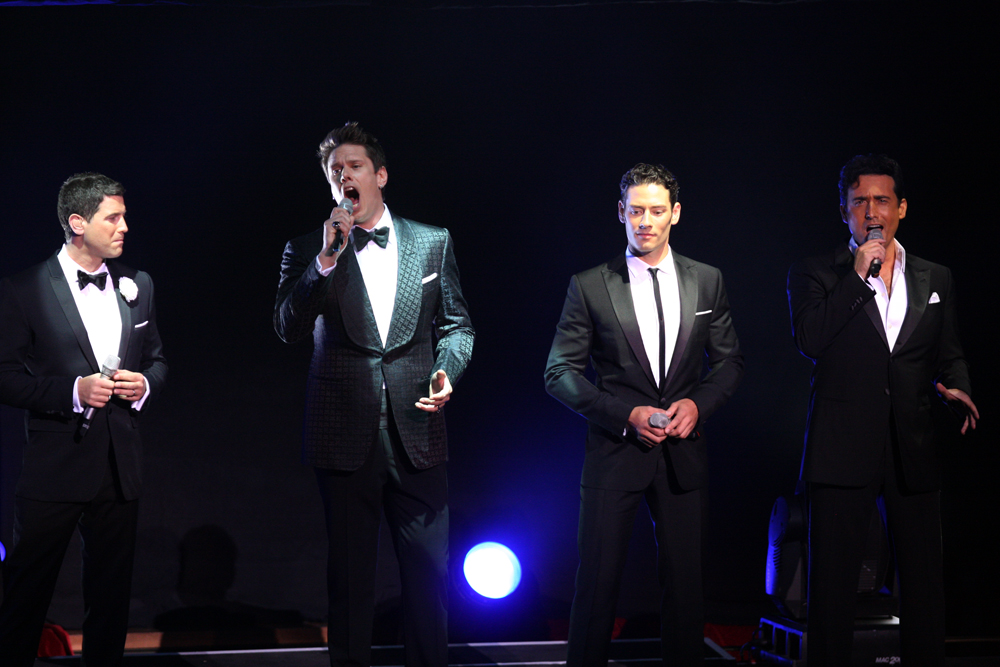
Il Divo performing at the Sydney Opera House in 2012

According to music historians, operatic pop songs became most prevalent with the rise of Tin Pan Alley musicians during the early 1900s. One influence was the large influx of Italian immigrants to the United States who popularized singers such as Enrico Caruso and inspired the creation of "novelty songs" using Italian dialect. The songs often used operatic repertory "to make a satirical or topical point". Popularized by American Vaudeville, musical comedies, jazz and operettas, examples include Irving Berlin's That Opera Rag, Billy Murray's My Cousin Caruso and Louis Armstrong's riffs on Rigoletto and Pagliacci. The subgenre subsequently dwindled after the 1920s but revived during the rock music era with albums such as The Who's Tommy and Queen's A Night at The Opera.

In 1986, operatic tenor Luciano Pavarotti had a hit with the Lucio Dalla song "Caruso", which helped to spark a flourishing of operatic pop. Other singers, including Andrea Bocelli, Josh Groban, and Katherine Jenkins, also recorded the number. Bocelli, in particular, soon became a leading representative of the subgenre while his famous duet partner, British soprano Sarah Brightman, also gravitated considerably towards this combination of opera and pop music. In the 2000s, singers and singing groups devoted primarily to operatic pop built on this renewed success. Groups like Il Divo and Amici Forever have achieved popularity with the mix of "contemporary pop with operatic style" characteristic of operatic pop.

== See also ==
- List of operatic pop artists
- Rock opera (and Category)
- Crossover music
