= Kretinga Eldership =

Eldership of Lithuania

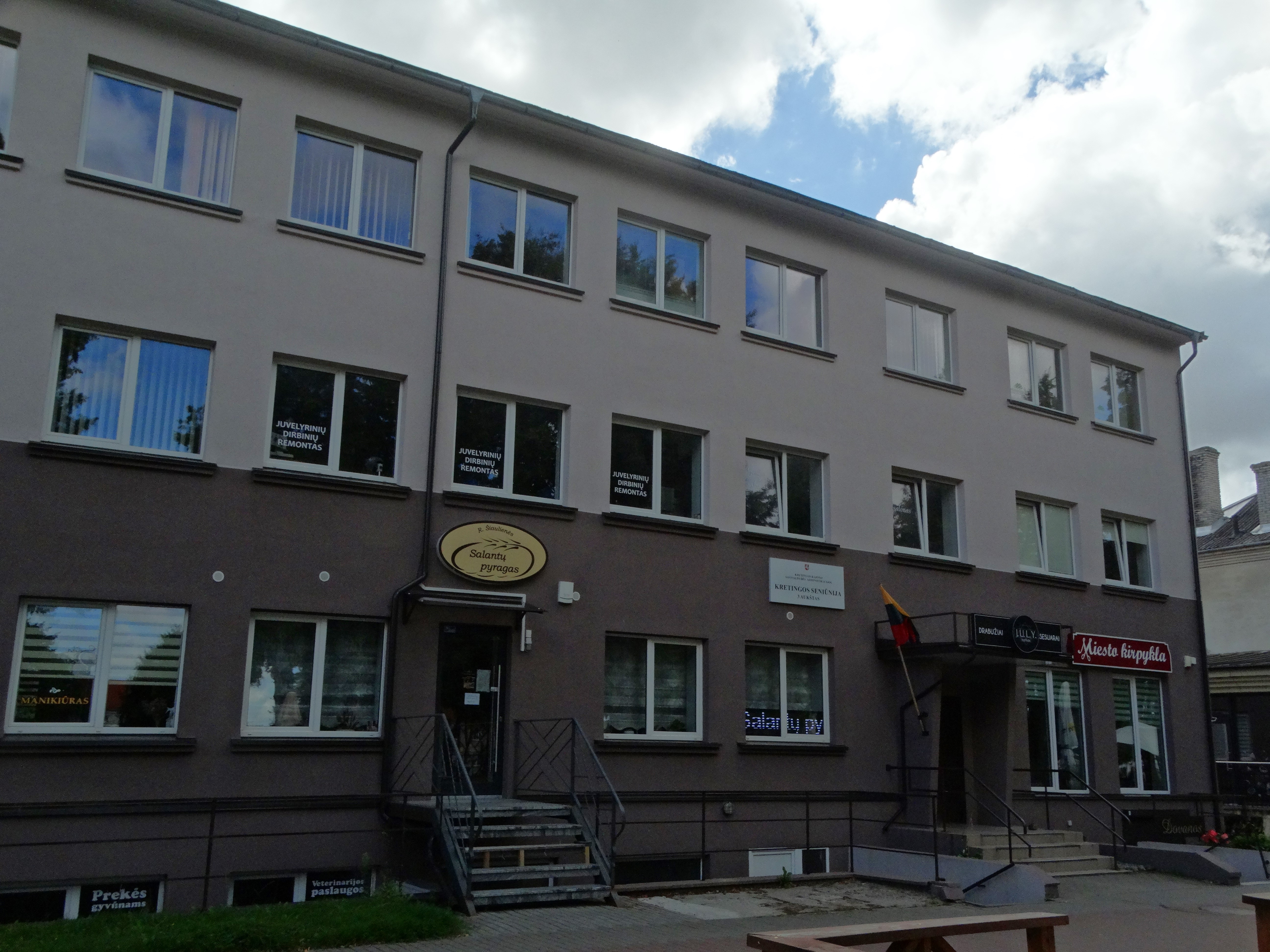
Eldership, Kretinga, Lithuania

The Kretinga Eldership (Lithuanian: Kretingos seniūnija) is an eldership of Lithuania, located in the Kretinga District Municipality. In 2021 its population was 4849.

It was established in 1995 within Kretinga Area. In 2017 the Vydmantai Eldership was separated from it (decision made on December 22, 2016, entered in force on July 1, 2017) by reassigning the residential areas Kiauleikiai, Liepynė, Parąžė, Pryšmančiai, Vilimiškė, and Vydmantai.
