= Kartena Eldership =

Eldership of Lithuania

The Kartena Eldership (Lithuanian: Kartenos seniūnija) is an eldership of Lithuania, located in the Kretinga District Municipality. In 2021 its population was 1433.
