= Mindaugas Rojus =

Lithuanian singer

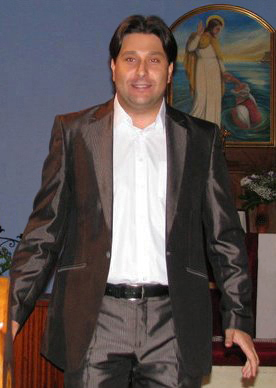
- Mindaugas Rojus in 2010

Background information
- Born: 24 January 1981 (age 45)
- Origin: Darbėnai; currently Klaipėda, Lithuania
- Genres: Opera, operetta, musical, classical music
- Occupations: Vocalist, opera singer
- Instruments: Vocals, piano
- Years active: 2006–present
- Member of: Žemaitijos perlai

Mindaugas Rojus (born 24 January 1981 in Darbėnai, Kretinga district, Lithuania) is a Lithuanian opera singer (tenor / baritone), a soloist of Klaipėda State Music Theatre, and a member of a stage duo Žemaitijos perlai (Samogitia's Pearls).

== Biography ==
Graduated high school of Darbėnai. In Klaipėda, Stasys Šimkus Conservatory he studied choral conducting (class of A. Purlienė) and solo singing (class of V. Balsytė). In 2001 and 2002, attended the Lithuanian Academy of Music preparatory studies (class of prof. Vladimiras Prudnikovas). Since 2004, he studied at Klaipėda University's Faculty of Arts Singing Department (class of M. Gylys, prof. Eduardas Kaniava), gained a master's degree.

He has two siblings – a younger sister, Sandra, and an older brother, Rimantas. With Klaipėda State Music Theatre ballerina Viktorija Gulnickaja has a son Augustinas Rojus (born June 9, 2010). Currently lives in a Lithuania's seaport town Klaipėda.

== Roles ==
In 2006, he won the audition for the role of Eugene Onegin and straight after that was invited to work in Klaipėda State Music Theatre. Notable roles:

- Onegin – in Pyotr Tchaikovsky opera Eugene Onegin
- Germont – in Giuseppe Verdi opera La traviata
- Aristide – in Paul Abraham operetta Ball im Savoy
- Prince Ypsheim – in Johann Strauss operetta Wiener Blut
- Jake – in musical drama Passion Spree by George Gershwin opera Porgy and Bess
- Pelléas – in opera readings Pelléas and Mélisande by Claude Debussy music and Maurice Maeterlinck play
- Eisenstein – in Johann Strauss operetta Die Fledermaus
- Boy – in Audronė Žigaitytė opera–phantasmagoria Frank'Einstein: The 21st Century
- Phoebus – in Zigmars Liepins' opera–melodrama Notre-Dame de Paris by Victor Hugo novel
- Fiorello – in Gioachino Rossini opera The Barber of Seville
- Juozelis – in Giedrius Kuprevičius musical Veronica
- Radish – in Antanas Kučinskas opera Potato's Tale
- Brother – in Vidmantas Bartulis opera Morning Star
- Pjeras – in Jurgis Gaižauskas opera Pinocchio
- Herstwood – in Raimond Pauls musical Sister Carrie
- Rohnsdorff – in Imre Kalman operetta Die Csárdásfürstin
- Perchik – in Jerry Bock musical Fiddler on the Roof
- Dido – in Henry Purcell opera Dido and Aeneas
- Gianni Schicchi – in Giacomo Puccini opera Gianni Schicchi

Baritone parts in other works:

- In Gabriel Fauré choral–orchestral setting of the Roman Catholic Mass for the Dead Requiem for baritone, soprano and chorus
- In Carl Orff scenic cantata Carmina Burana for tenor, baritone, soprano and chorus

== Other projects ==
In 2009, he participated LTV and LTV World opera singers contest Triumfo arka (Triumphal Arch) where he was one of the viewers' biggest favorites, reached semifinal. Performed Mister X aria "Zwei Märchenaugen" from Imre Kalman operetta The Circus Princess, Xerxes aria "Ombra mai fu" from Georg Friedrich Händel opera Serse, Don Quixote aria "The Impossible Dream (The Quest)" from Mitch Leigh musical Man of La Mancha, Germont's aria "Di Provenza il mar" from Giuseppe Verdi opera La traviata, Yeletsky's aria "I love you beyond measure" from Pyotr Tchaikovsky opera The Queen of Spades, and others.

Collaborates with his colleague from Klaipėda State Music Theatre, soprano Loreta Ramelienė as a stage duo Žemaitijos perlai (Samogitia's Pearls). Its repertoire includes well known classical music pieces and pop songs. Also cooperates with the Kretinga School of Art ensemble Lyra, with whom he released an album.

Performed in Lithuania, Poland, Latvia, Russia, Italy, Germany, participated in music competitions (Jūrmala festival, the International Belvedere Competition of soloists etc.

== Awards ==
The winner of Vox Rotary, a Republican contest of young vocalists, and the recipient of J. Augaitytė Prize, as well as the graduate of international Imre Kalman Competition (2008, Moscow), where he also won a special prize for the best interpretation of Johann Strauss' piece.

In 2009, for the role of Prince Ypsheim in Johann Strauss operetta Wiener Blut he was nominated for The Golden Cross of the Stage.

== Discography ==
- 2004 – Kartu (with Lyra).
- 2009 – Giedrius Kuprevičius. Musical Veronica, Klaipėda State Music Theatre.
- Triumfo arka. Auksiniai balsai II (CD / DVD, released in 2010) includes his performings of Hussar's song from Imre Kalman operetta The Circus Princess and a Neapolitan song O Surdato 'Nnamurato by Aniello Califano and Enrico Cannio.
- In 2011, M. Rojus recorded an official anthem of Šventoji – Šventas krantas (Šventosios himnas) (lyrics by known Lithuanian writer and poet Vidmantė Jasukaitytė).
