= Sylvia Frumkin =

Pseudonym given for the schizophrenic subject of a biography

Sylvia Frumkin is the pseudonym given for the schizophrenic subject of Susan Sheehan's 1982 Pulitzer Prize-winning biography Is There No Place on Earth for Me? first published serially in The New Yorker. A quotation from the book, giving some of her dialog, gives some of the general flavor of her behavior:

"There's no such thing as schizophrenia, there's only mental telepathy. I once had a friend named Camilla Costello. She was Abbott and Costello's daughter. She said to me, 'You know, Sylvia, I have a lot of friends, but you're my best friend.' I'm working here. I'm an intern at Creedmoor. I'm in the Pentecostal Church, but I'm thinking of changing my religion. I have a dog at home. I love instant oatmeal. When you have Jesus, you don't need a diet. Mick Jagger wants to marry me. I want to get out the revolving door. With Jesus Christ, anything is possible. I used to hit my mother. It was the hyperactivity from all the cookies I ate. I'm the personification of Casper the Friendly Ghost. I used to go outside asking the other kids to be my friend when I was little. California's the most beautiful state in the Union. I've been there once, by television. My name is Jack Warden, and I'm an actress."

As a result of the publication of her history, she was given more effective treatment. Nonetheless, she continued to go in and out of mental hospitals and died in 1994, according to a follow-up article by Susan Sheehan in The New Yorker titled "The Last Days of Sylvia Frumkin." The same article disclosed her legal name as Maxine Mason, sister of U.S. Democratic Party activist Trudy Mason.
