= Vydmantai Eldership =

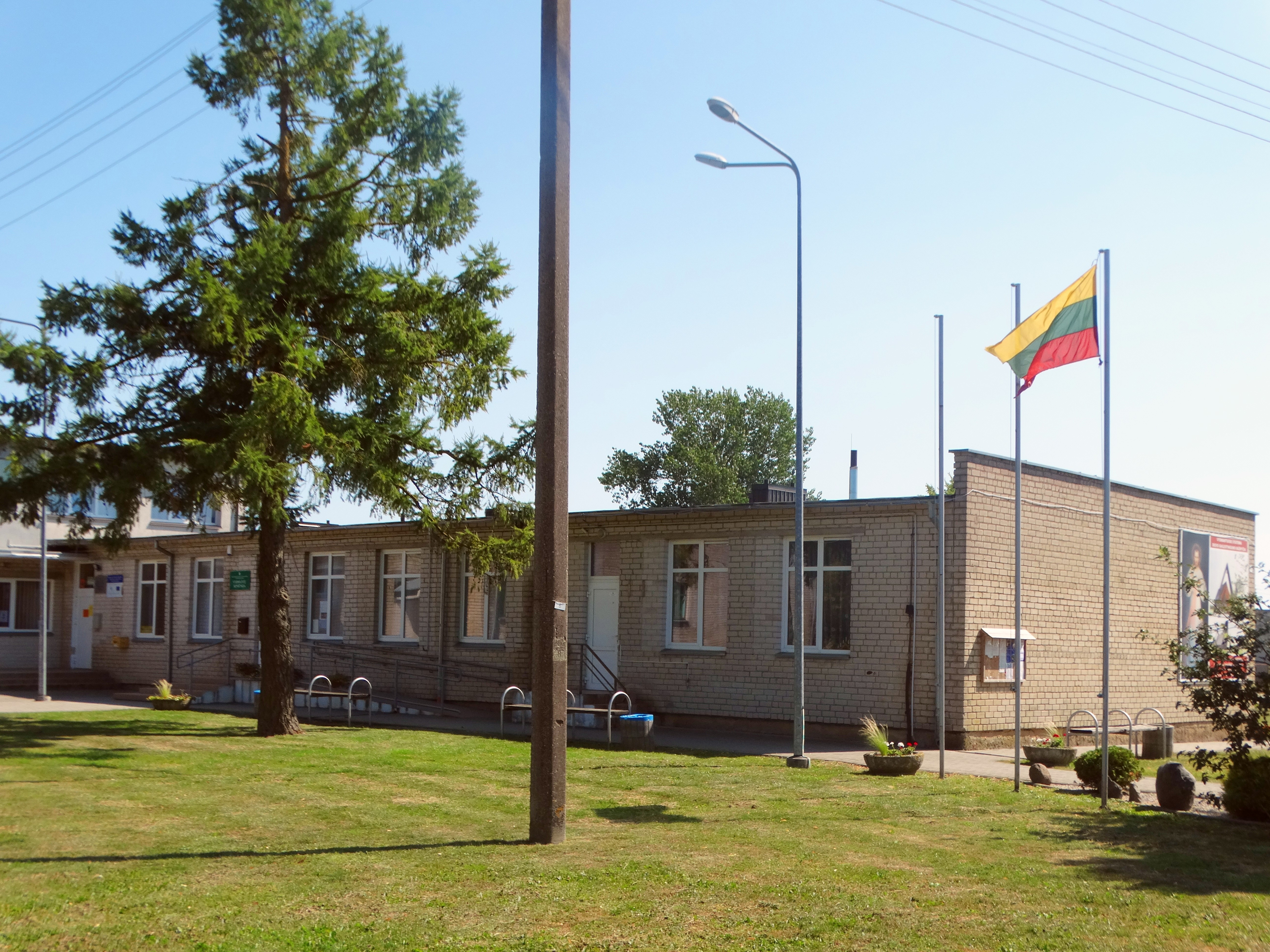

Vydmantai Eldership (Lithuanian: Vydmantų seniūnija) is an eldership of Lithuania, with the administrative center in the Vydmantai village, located in the Kretinga District Municipality. In 2021 its population was 2239.

It was established in 2017 by separation from Kretinga Eldership (decision made on December 22, 2016, entered in force on July 1, 2017) by reassigning the residential areas Kiauleikiai, Liepynė, Parąžė, Pryšmančiai, Vilimiškė, and Vydmantai.
