= Torsney =

Torsney is a surname. Notable people with the surname include:

- George F. Torsney (1896–1942), American businessman and politician
- Paddy Torsney (born 1962), Canadian politician
- Robert Torsney, former NYPD police officer and perpetrator of the shooting of Randolph Evans
