= Church of St. Anthony of Padua, Pakutuvėnai =

Pakutuvėnai St Anthony of Padua church and monastery
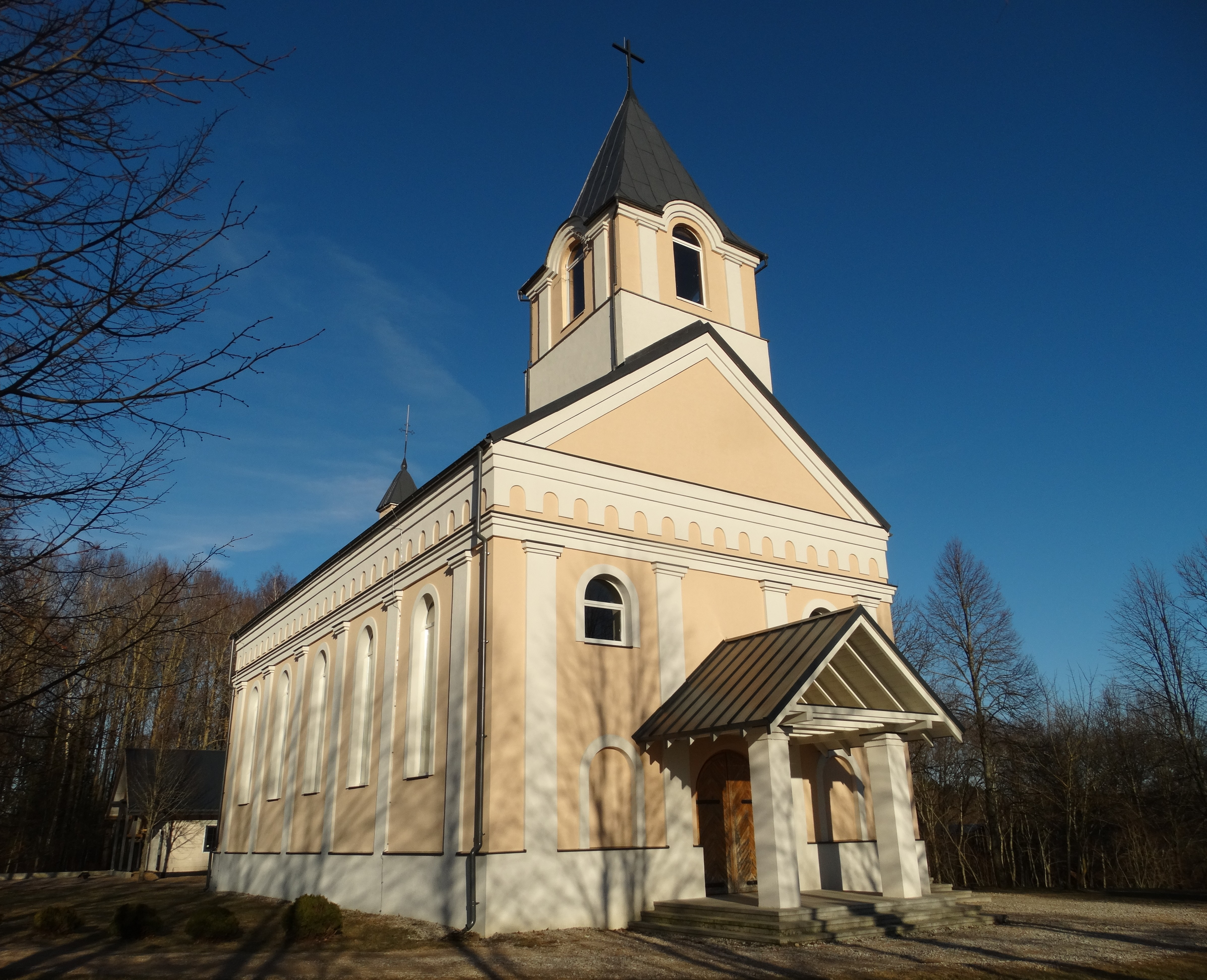

General information
- Location: Pakutuvėnai, Lithuania
- Coordinates: 55.899232°N 21.690131°E

Website
- www.

The present day Pakutuvėnai church was built between 1941–1943 on the initiative of two of the residents of Pakutuvėnai Village, the brother and sister Justina and Juozapas Stropai, and the Plungė parish priest, Prelate Povilas Pukis.

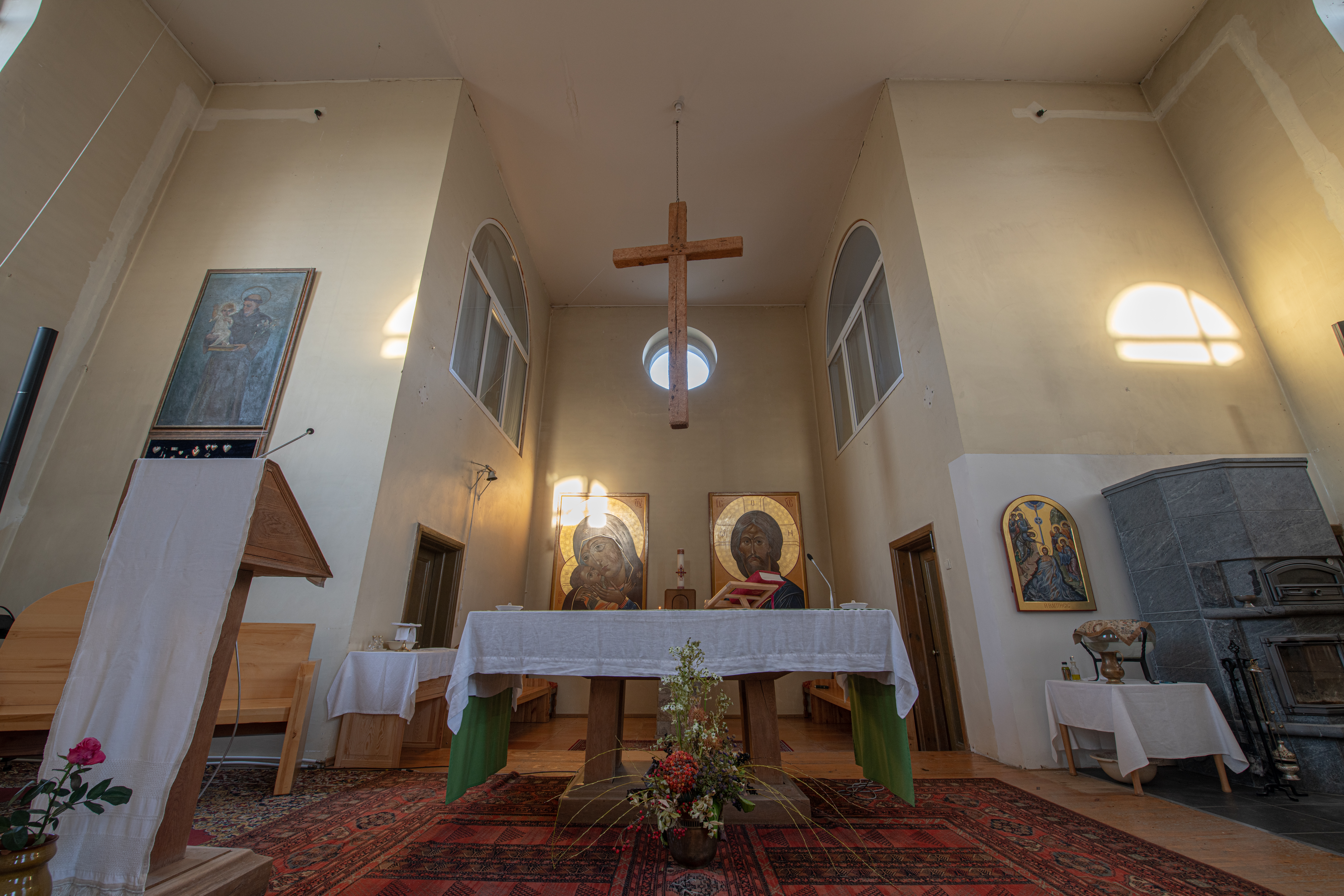
Pakutuvėnai church interior

== History ==
In 1941, the Kretinga district engineer, Jonas Zubkus, prepared the church drawings. The Plungė kommandatura provided 600 bags of cement for the floor of the church, while the Plungė burgomaster, Edvardas Misevičius, following a request from the parish priest, granted 1200 bags of cement left behind by the Russians and 27 iron beams to the church. The Pakutuvėnai church is laid out in a rectangular shape that is 24 metres long and 12 metres wide. On 26 September 1943, the Telšiai Diocesan Bishop Vincentas Borisevičius solemnly consecrated the church. At first three altars were installed, but only one presently remains. The church has Classical characteristics. At this time, the church is managed by the Franciscan monks.

== Gallery ==
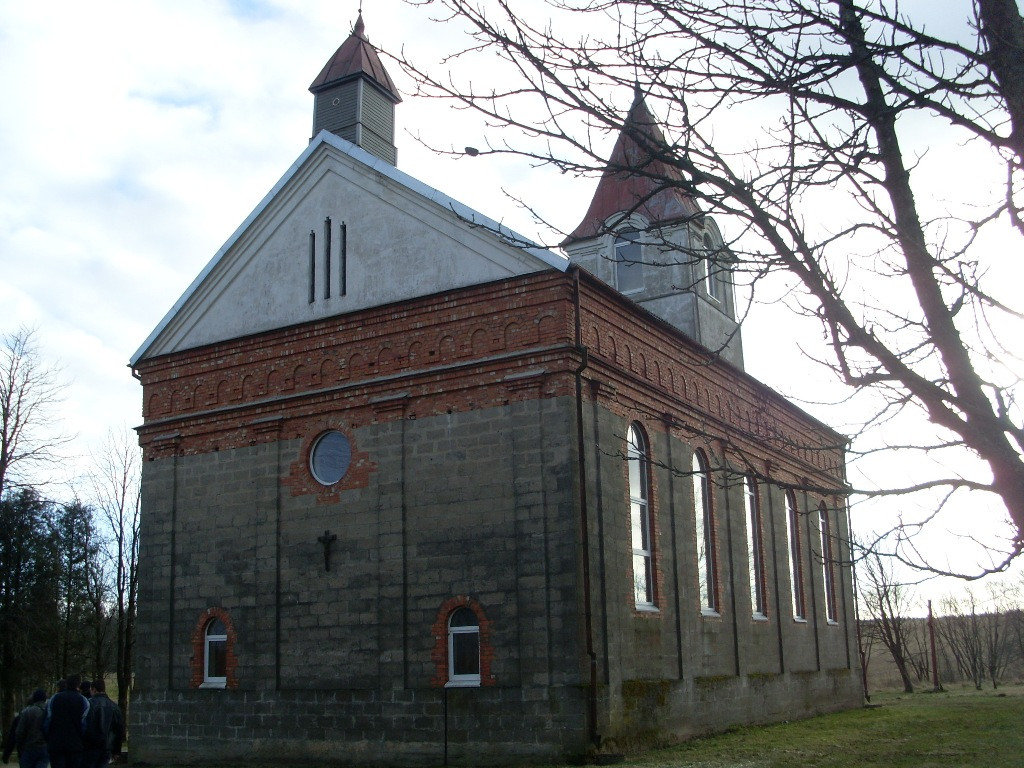

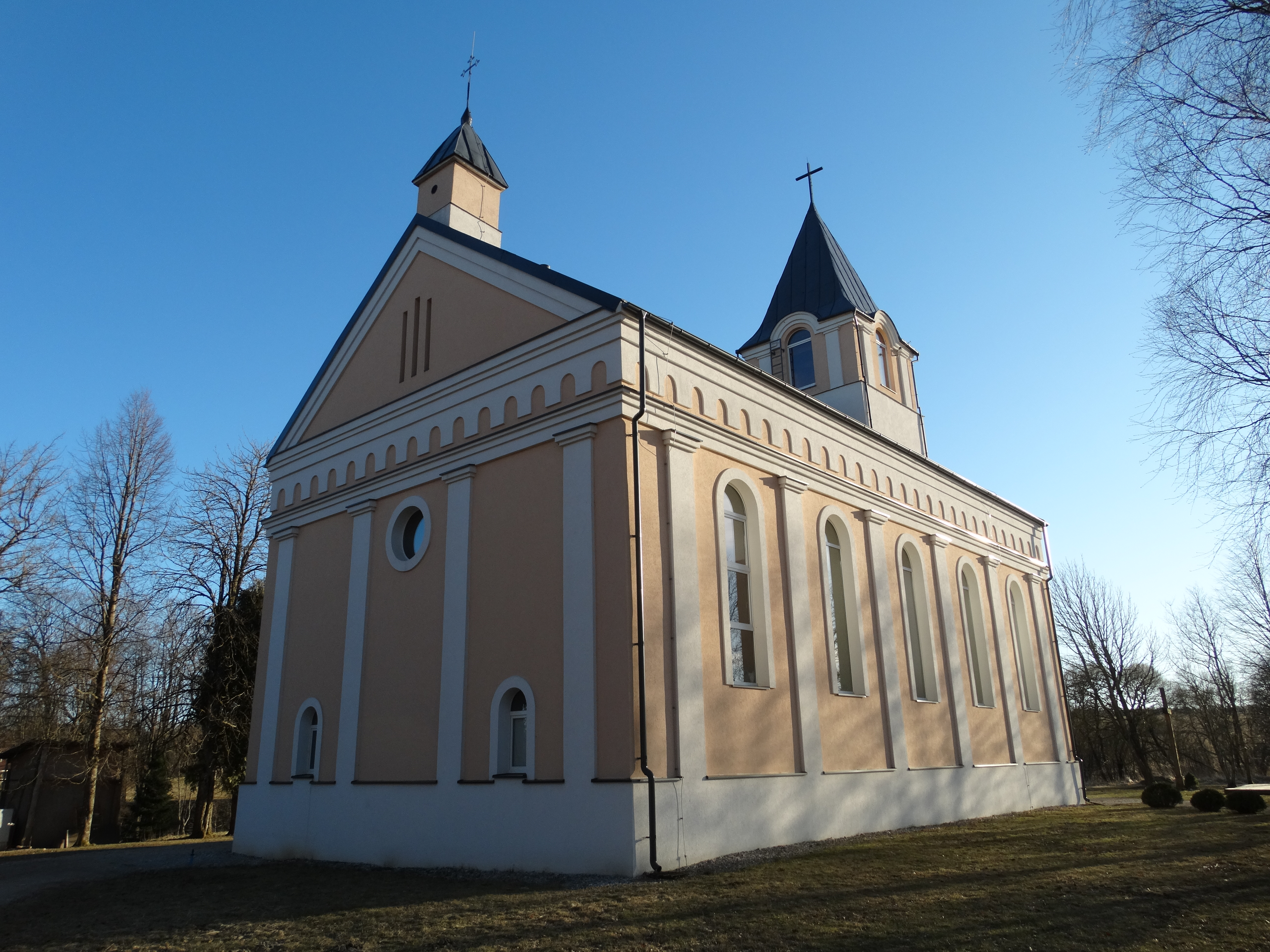

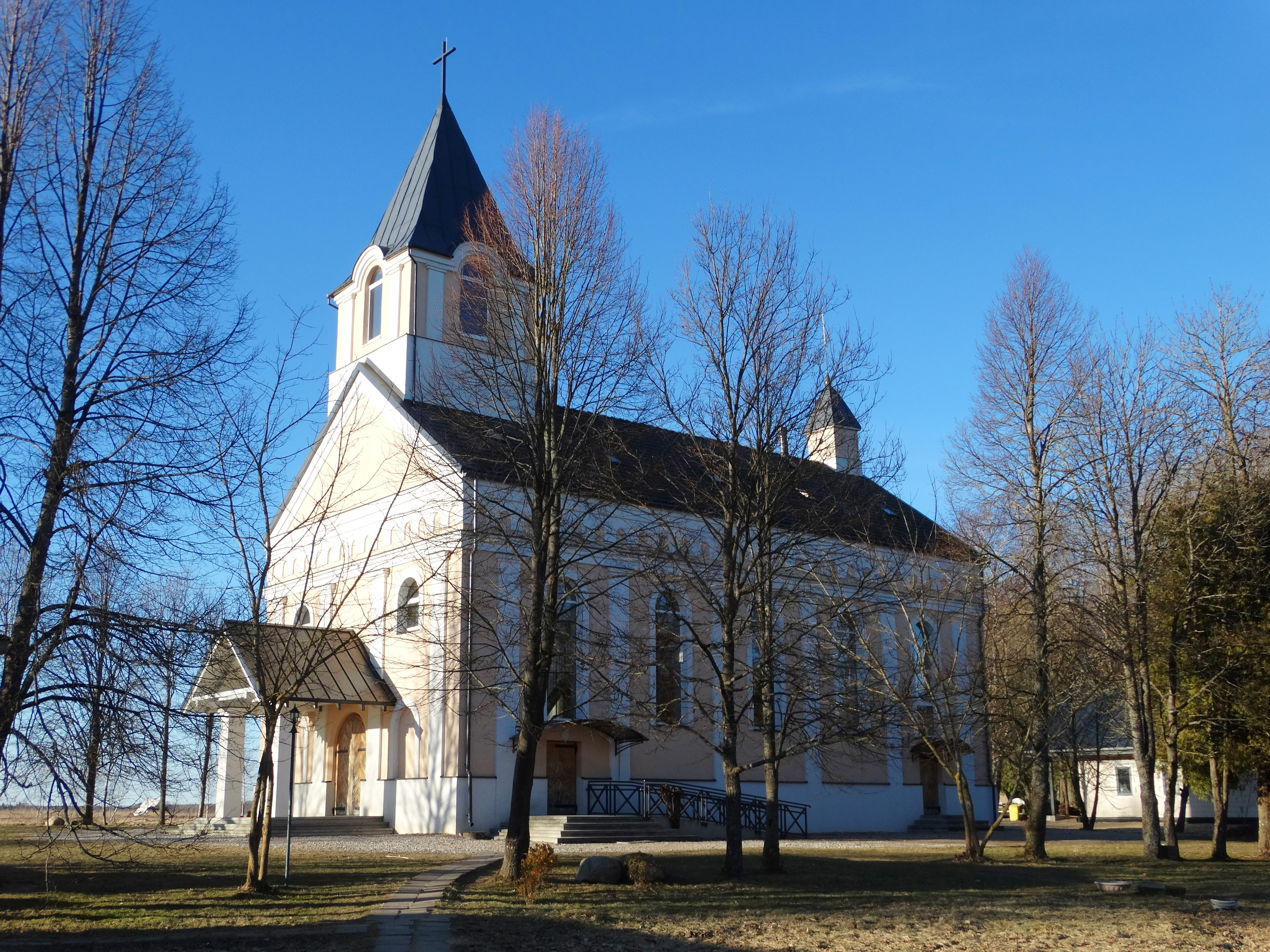

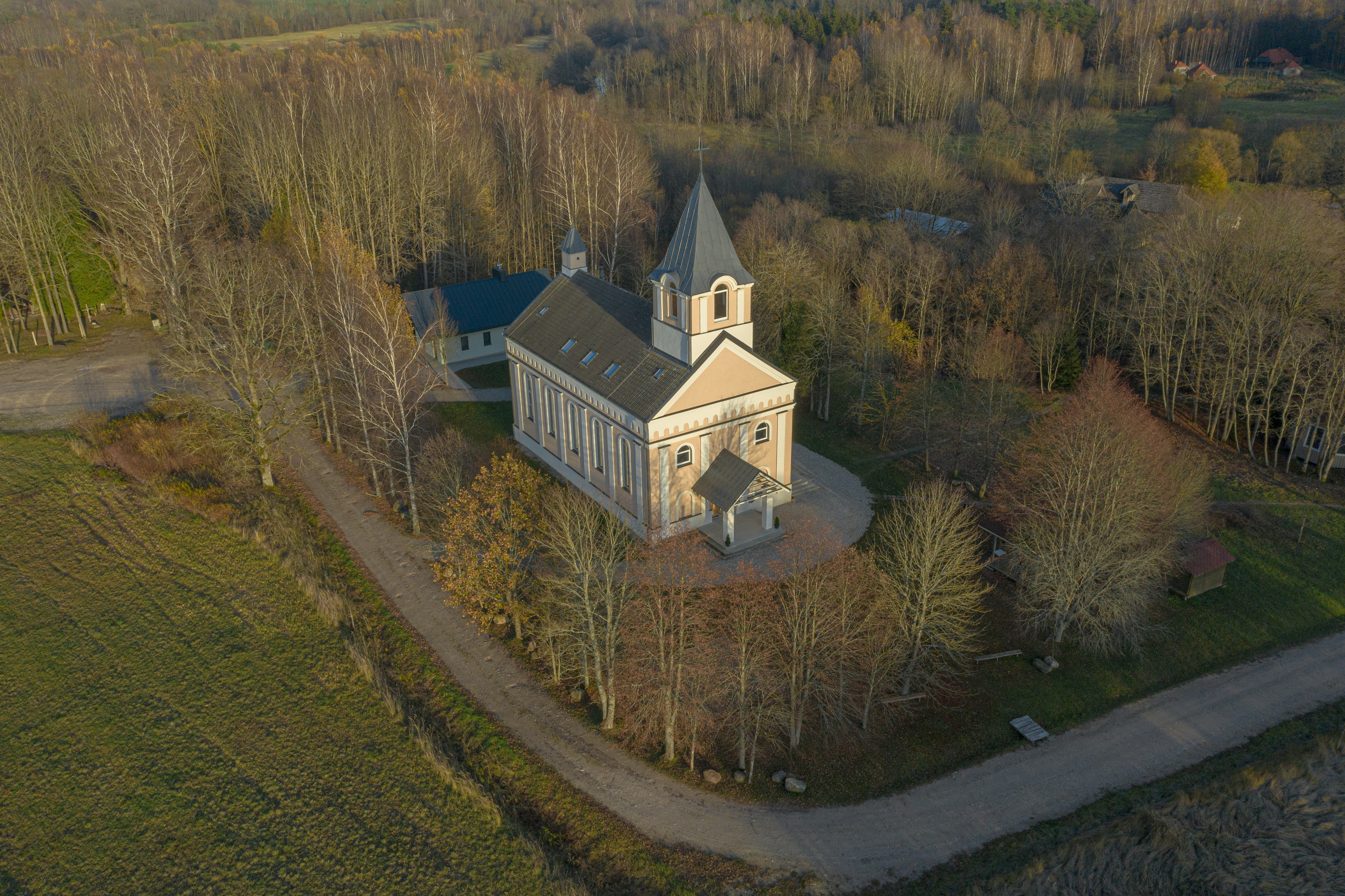

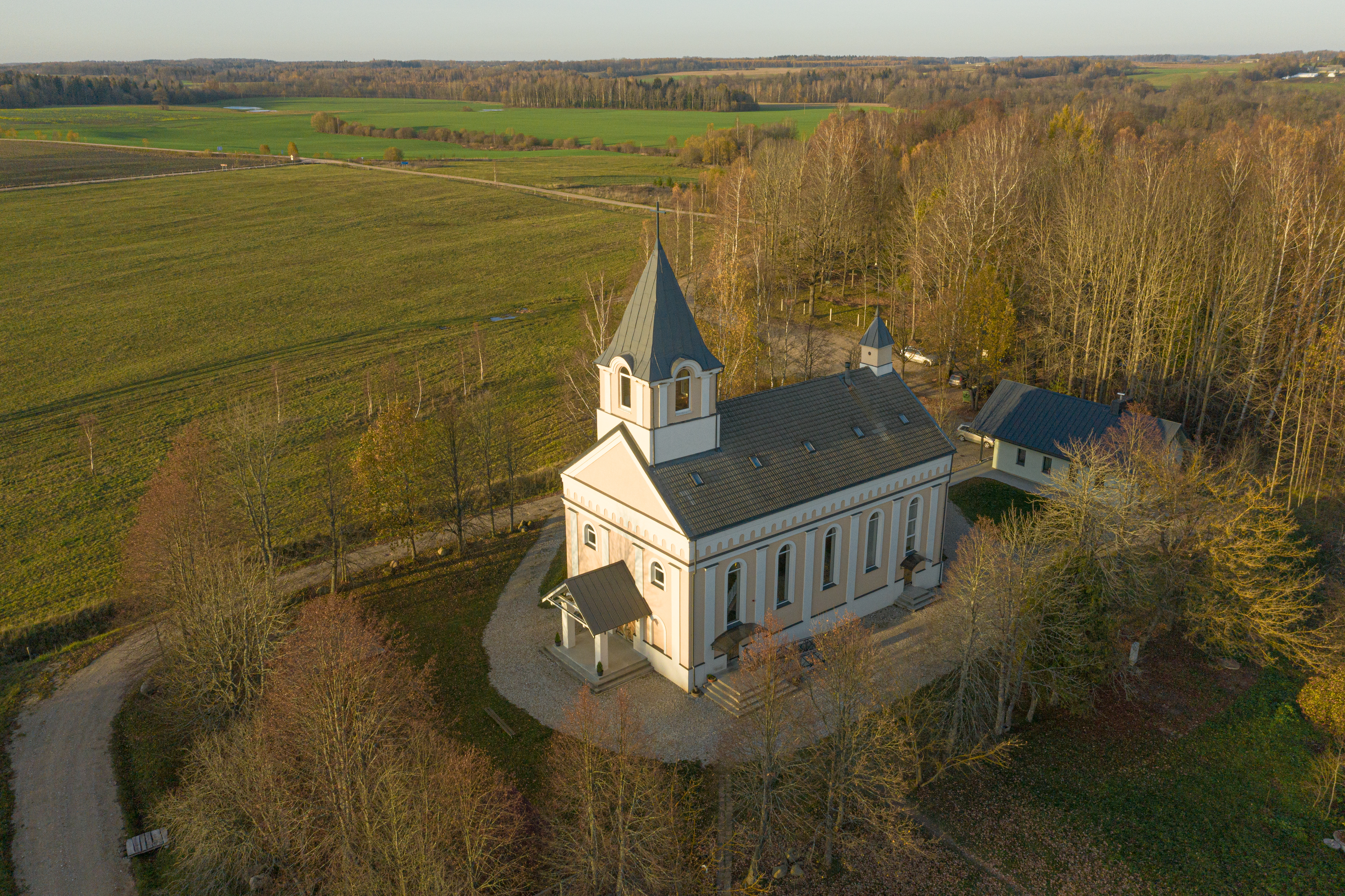

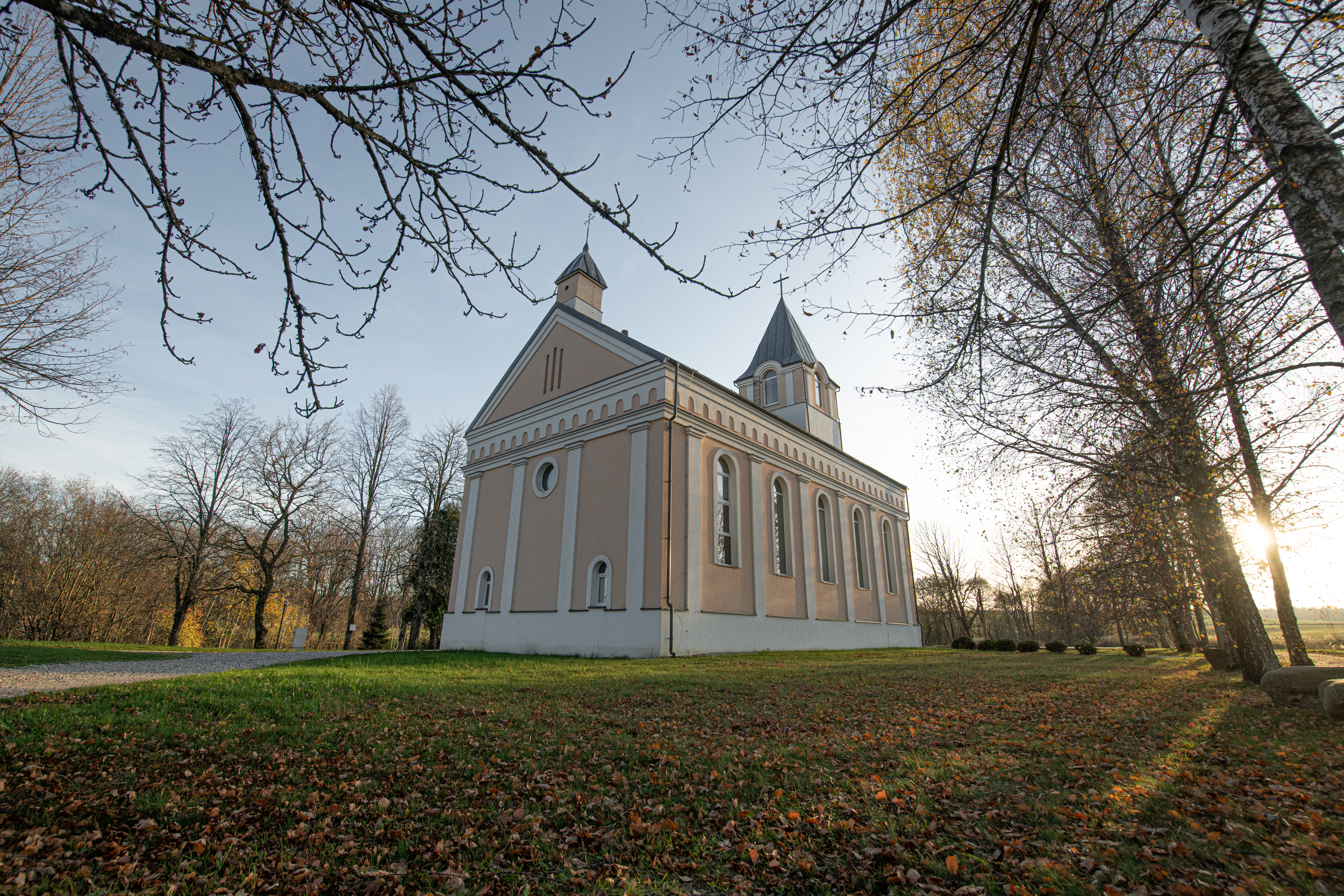

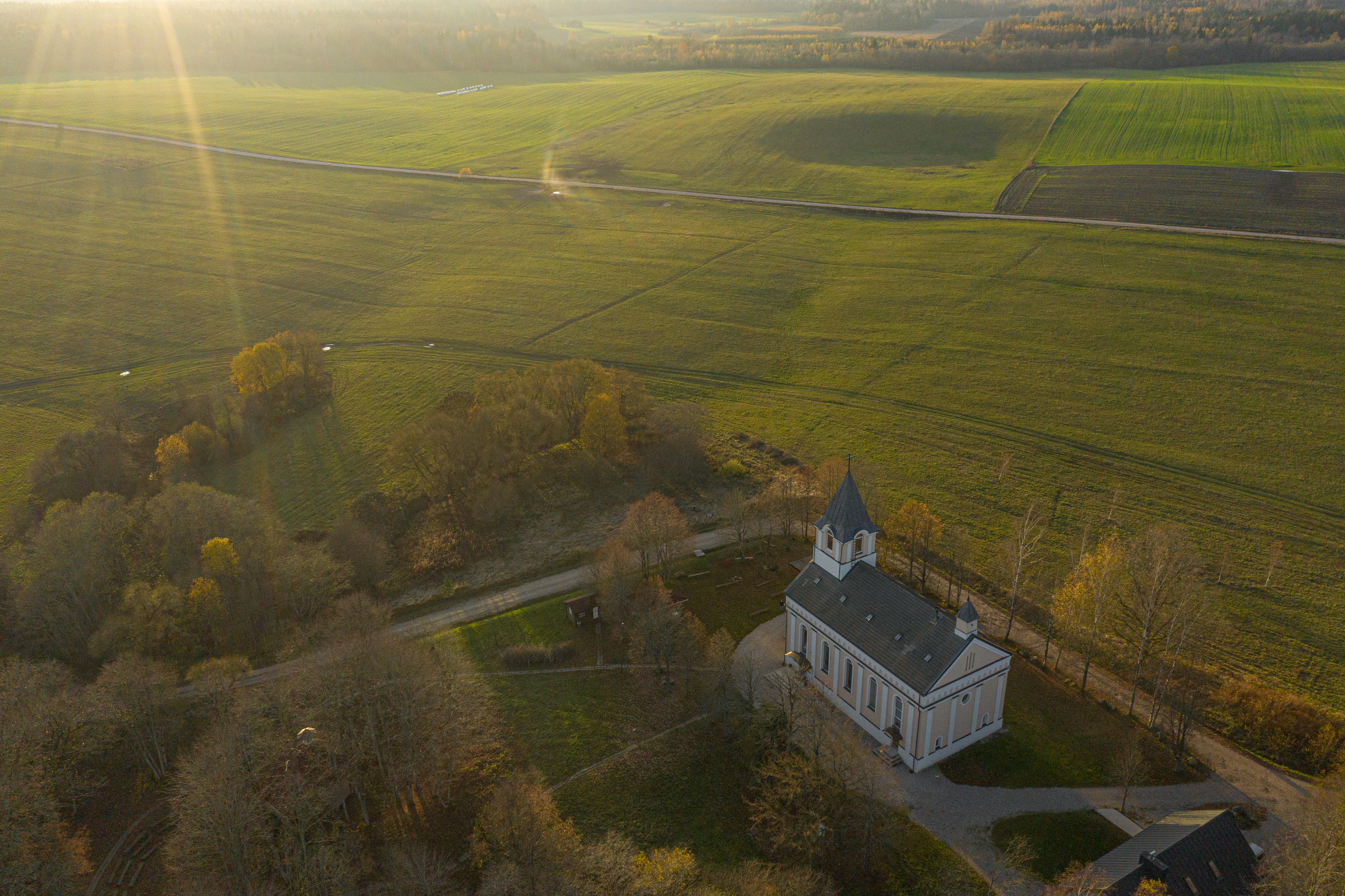
