= Is There No Place on Earth for Me? =

1982 nonfiction book by Susan Sheehan

Is There No Place On Earth For Me?
- First edition cover
- Author: Susan Sheehan
- Language: English
- Genre: Biography
- Publisher: Houghton Mifflin
- Publication date: 1982
- Publication place: United States
- Media type: Print (hardback, paperback & audiobook)
- Pages: 333 (first edition)
- Awards: Pulitzer Prize for General Nonfiction
- ISBN: 0-395-31871-8

Is There No Place On Earth For Me? is a nonfiction book written by Susan Sheehan and published in 1982 by Houghton Mifflin. It won the 1983 Pulitzer Prize for General Nonfiction. This book recounts the lonely, harrowing life of Sylvia Frumkin who is diagnosed with schizophrenia.

Sheehan followed Frumkin for two-and-a-half years, much of which was spent inside a mental hospital, Creedmoor Psychiatric Center, in Queens. It presents outstanding reporting on what it's like to be mentally ill and how the mental health system often fails in its treatment of those it was designed to help.

The book originally ran as a four-part series in The New Yorker in 1981 and won the 1983 Pulitzer Prize for nonfiction.

== See also ==
- Rethinking Madness
- Elyn Saks
- Nellie Bly
