= Darbėnai Eldership =

Eldership of Lithuania

The Darbėnai Eldership (Lithuanian: Darbėnų seniūnija) is an eldership of Lithuania, located in the Kretinga District Municipality. In 2021 its population was 3863.
