= Gargždelė =

- Village
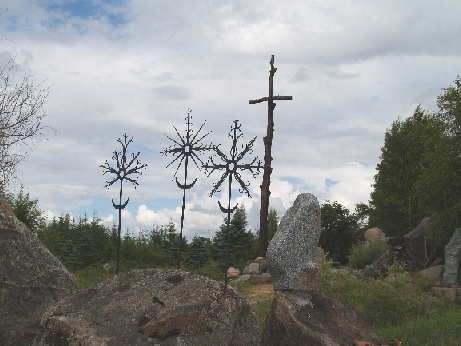
- View of Orvydai Homestead

- Location of Gargždelė
- Coordinates: 56°03′11″N 21°36′50″E
- Country: Lithuania
- County: Klaipėda County
- Municipality: Kretinga district municipality
- Elderate: Imbarė elderate

Population (2011)
  - Total: 56
- Time zone: UTC+2 (EET)
  - Summer (DST): UTC+3 (EEST)

Gargždelė is a village located 2 km (1.2 mi) south-east of Salantai in Kretinga district municipality, Lithuania. According to the 2011 census, it had 56 residents.

It is noted for the Orvidai Homestead, a museum, which features an environment created by Vilius Orvidas.
