= Joshua Bloch (rabbi) =

Lithuanian-born American rabbi and librarian (1890–1957)

- Title: Rabbi

Personal life
- Born: December 9, 1890 Dorbian, Kovno Governorate, Russian Empire (now Lithuania)
- Died: September 26, 1957 (aged 66) Creedmoor State Hospital; Queens Village, Queens, New York, U.S.
- Spouse: Frieda Sandel Bloch (m. 1915–1957)
- Children: 1
- Parents: Baer-Moses Bloch (father); Necha (Stoch) Bloch (mother)
- Occupation: Chaplin, librarian, lecturer

Religious life
- Religion: Judaism
- Board member of: Jewish Institute of Religion; American Jewish Historical Society; National Jewish Welfare Board

Academic background
- Education: New York University

Joshua Bloch (December 9, 1890 – September 26, 1957) was a Lithuanian-born American rabbi and librarian who served as a faculty member in New York University from 1919 to 1928 – and as the Chaplain of the New York State Department of Mental Hygiene from 1922 until his death.

== Biography ==
=== Early life and education ===
Bloch was born on December 9, 1890, in Dorbian, Kovno Governorate, the son of Baer-Moses Bloch and Necha Stoch.

Bloch immigrated to America in 1907 and got his secondary education in New York City, New York. He then attended Hebrew Union College from 1911 to 1916, the University of Cincinnati from 1912 to 1916, Dropsie College from 1913 to 1914, Columbia University from 1913 to 1915, the Jewish Theological Seminary from 1914 to 1915 and the Union Theological Seminary from 1914 to 1915, and New York University from 1914 to 1918. He received an M.A. and Ph.D. from the latter university and was its lecturer in Semitic languages and literature. He was a faculty member of the Jewish Institute of Religion from 1922 to 1923.

=== Career ===
From 1919 to 1928, Bloch was a faculty member in New York University from 1919 to 1928. In 1922, he became chaplain of the New York State Department of Mental Hygiene – a post that he held until his death in 1957.

Bloch also served as head of the Jewish Division of the New York Public Library from 1923 to 1956. Under him, the Library developed one of the major Judaica collections in the United States. He arranged a number of exhibitions on Judaica at the Library. His bibliographical research into the history of Hebrew was published by the Library's Bulletin of the New York Public Library on multiple occasions. He founded the quarterly Journal of Jewish Bibliography in 1938 and served as its editor until 1943. He was appointed to the publication committee of the Jewish Publication Society in 1940, and in 1941 he was appointed to the editorial board of the Jewish Apocryphal Literature Series. He wrote On the Apocalyptic in Judaism in 1952, Of Making Many Books (an annotated list of books published by the Jewish Publication Society from 1890 to 1952) in 1953, and The People and the Book (a 300-year history of Jewish-American life) in 1954. His bibliography was collected by Dora Steinglass's 1960 book A Bibliography of the Writings of Joshua Bloch (1910–1958).

In 1935, when pamphleteers Raymond J. Healey and Ernest F. Elmhurst claimed the Talmud commanded Jews to kill Christians for ritual purposes, Bloch discredited the blood libel accusation in the resulting trial by providing authoritative testimony that refuted the accusation. He served as rabbi in Rockville Centre, New York, and Lake Charles, Louisiana. He was trustee of the Union Free School District No. 5 in Nassau County for six years and of the Central High School District No. 2 for five years. From 1934 to 1937, he was president of the latter high school district. By the end of his life, he was living in New Hyde Park, Long Island.

Bloch contributed to the Encyclopædia Britannica, the Harvard Theological Review, The Jewish Quarterly Review, the Journal of the American Oriental Society, the Journal of the Society of Oriental Research, the American Journal of Semitic Languages, and the Universal Jewish Encyclopedia. He also edited the latter's department of literature. He served on the American Jewish Historical Society's Executive Council and as its vice-president and Publications Committee Chairman. He was a fellow of the Jewish Academy of Arts and Science and a member of the Jewish Book Council, the New York Board of Rabbis, the Central Conference of American Rabbis, and the national committee of the National Jewish Welfare Board. In 1915, he married Frieda R. Sandel. They had one child, Nehama.

=== Death ===
Bloch died from a heart attack at Creedmoor State Hospital in Queens Village, Queens, where he was delivering a Rosh Hashanah sermon as a chaplain of the New York State Department of Mental Hygiene that operated the hospital, on September 26, 1957.
