= Erškėtynas Stream and Chapel =

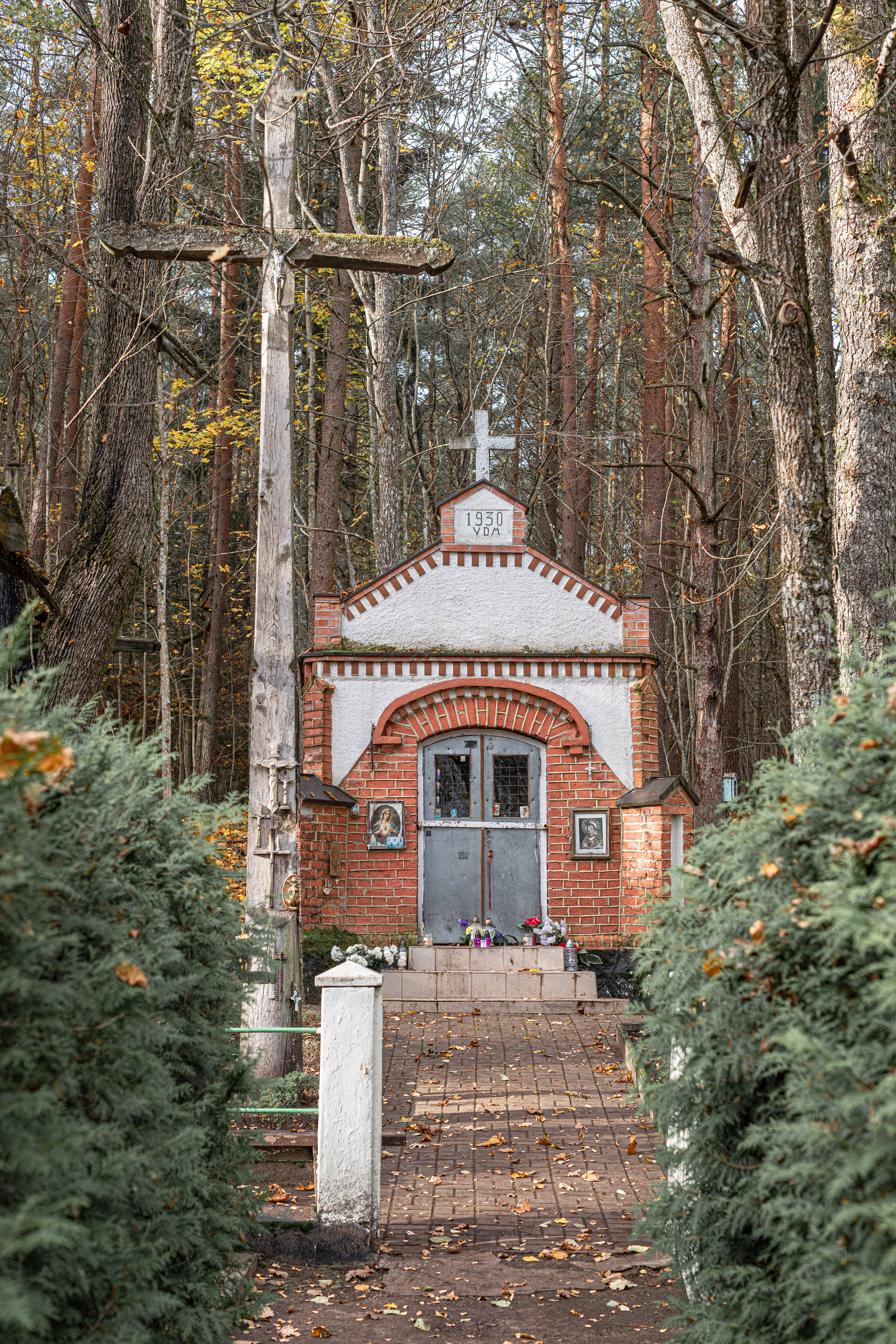
- Interactive map of the Erškėtynas Stream and Chapel area

General information
- Type: Chapel
- Location: Kretinga, Lithuania
- Coordinates: 55.983675°N 21.226533°E

Website
- www.

Erškėtynas Stream is located in Joskaudai Forest in Kretinga District Municipality, Lithuania between the villages of Dimitravas and Lazdininkai. A nearby chapel that was built in honour of the Mother of God is often referred to as Erškėtynas Stream Chapel.

== History ==
The stream itself has been famous for many years for its healing properties, and the residents of the surrounding villages traditionally came to wash their faces and eyes in the stream. Today, a well has been built to aid in accessing the stream. The residents say that, when the chapel was abandoned in Soviet times, and gatherings were forbidden there, the water in the stream dried out and it only returned when the chapel began to be taken care of again.

The chapel was built in 1926, when the residents of Lazdininkai village experienced an apparition of the Virgin Mary. In 1930, it was rebuilt as a bigger chapel.

To the elders in the Erškėtynas area, the vicinity is still sacred and religious believers often gather here during Whitsun as well as other important Christian celebrations.

== Gallery ==
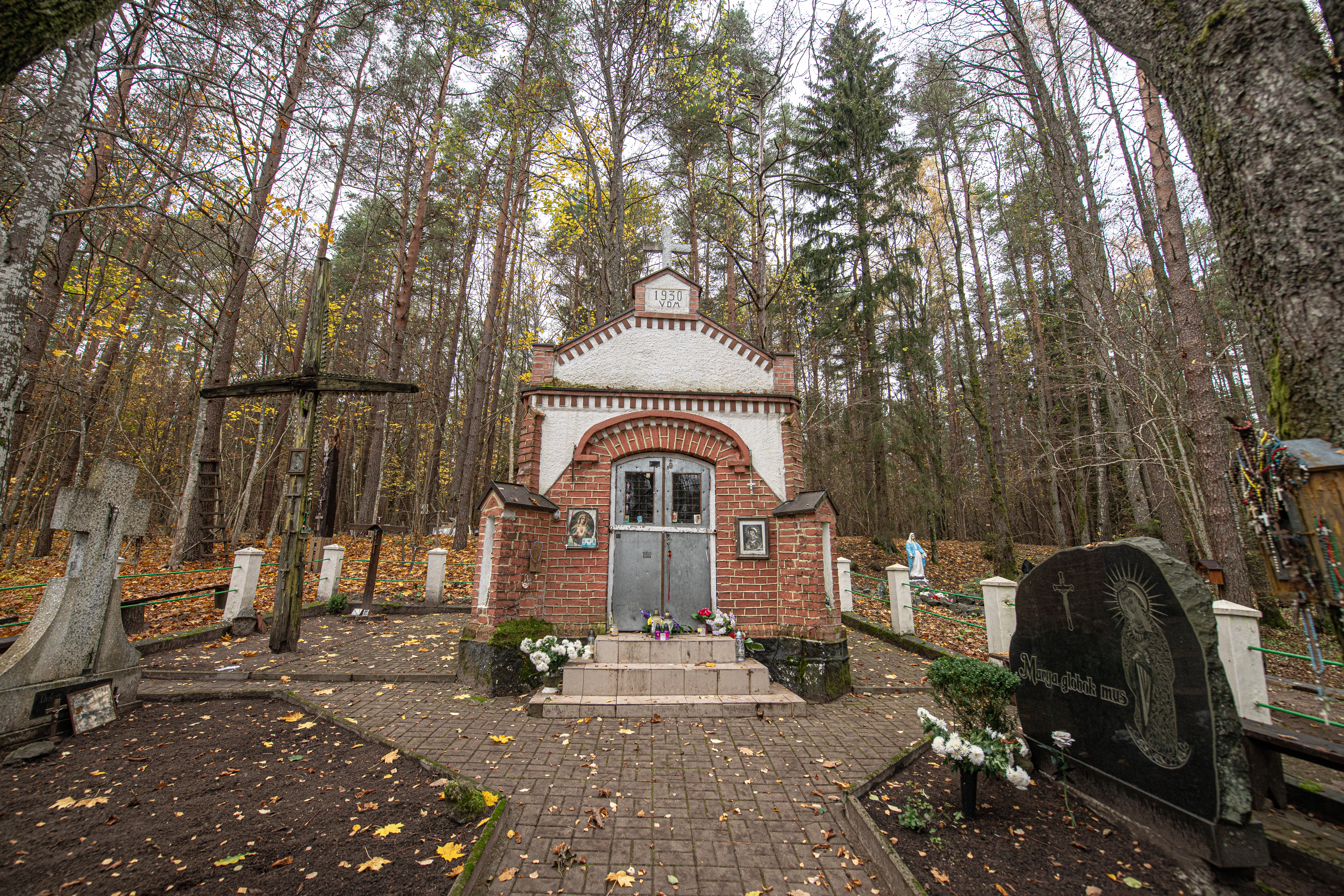

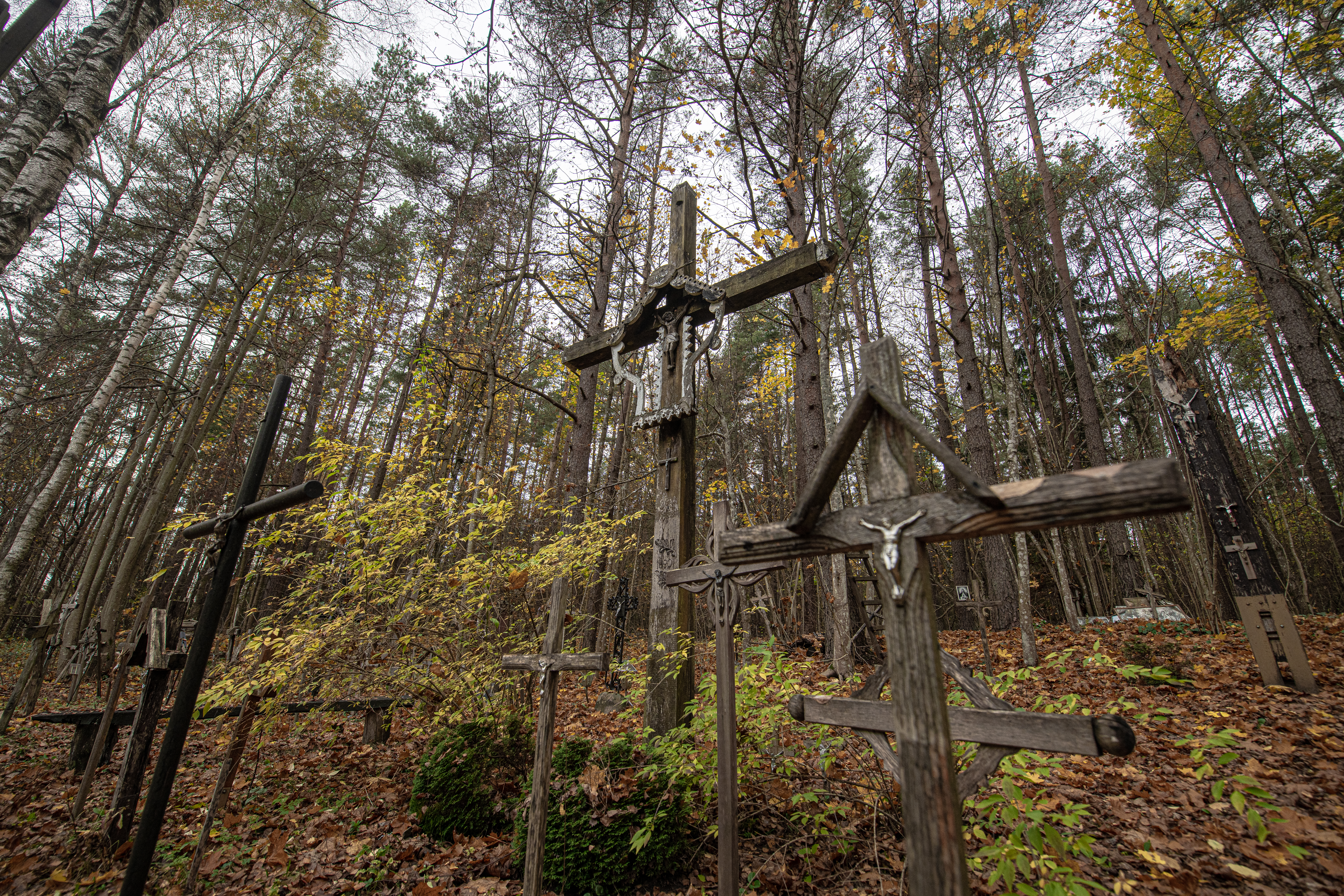

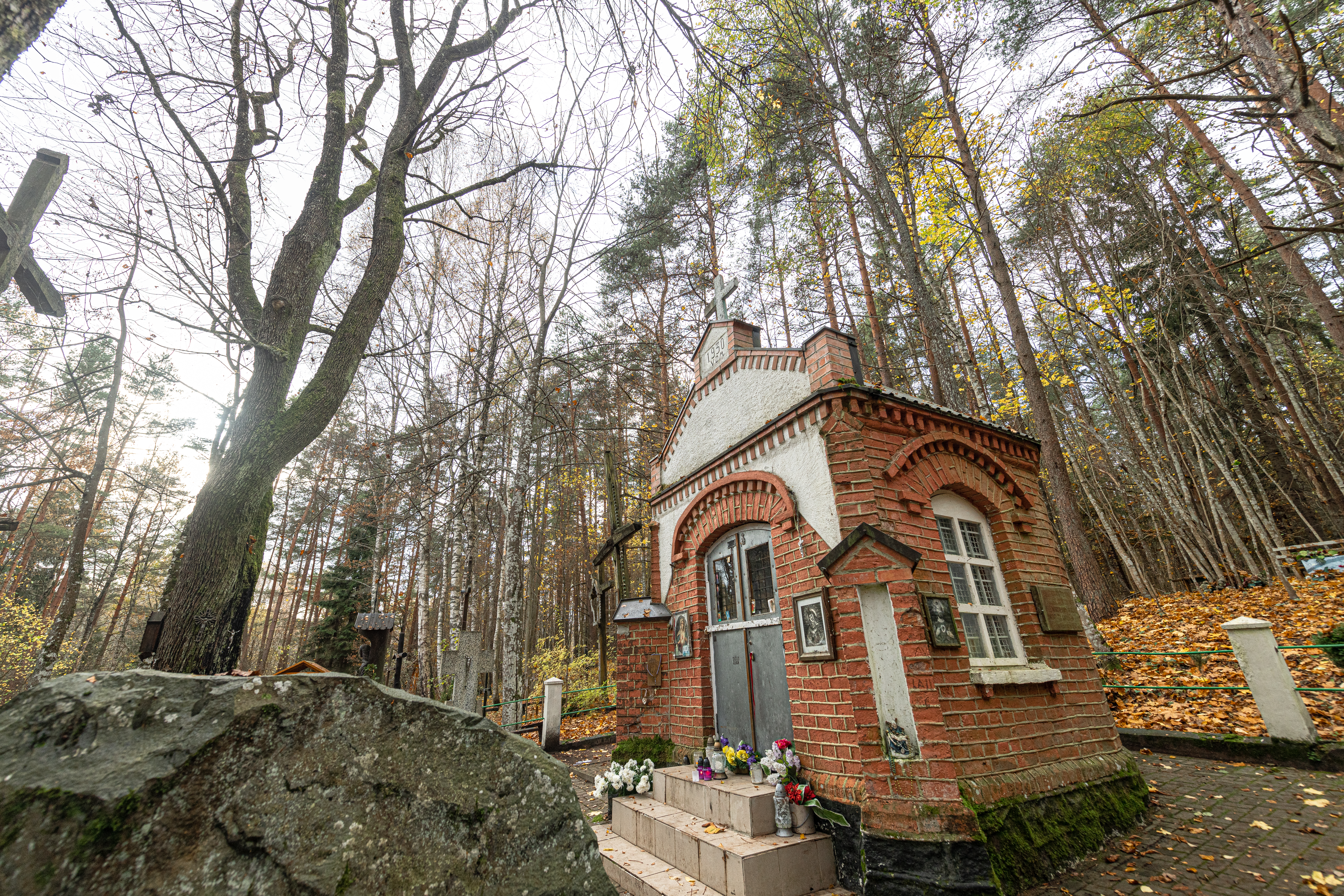

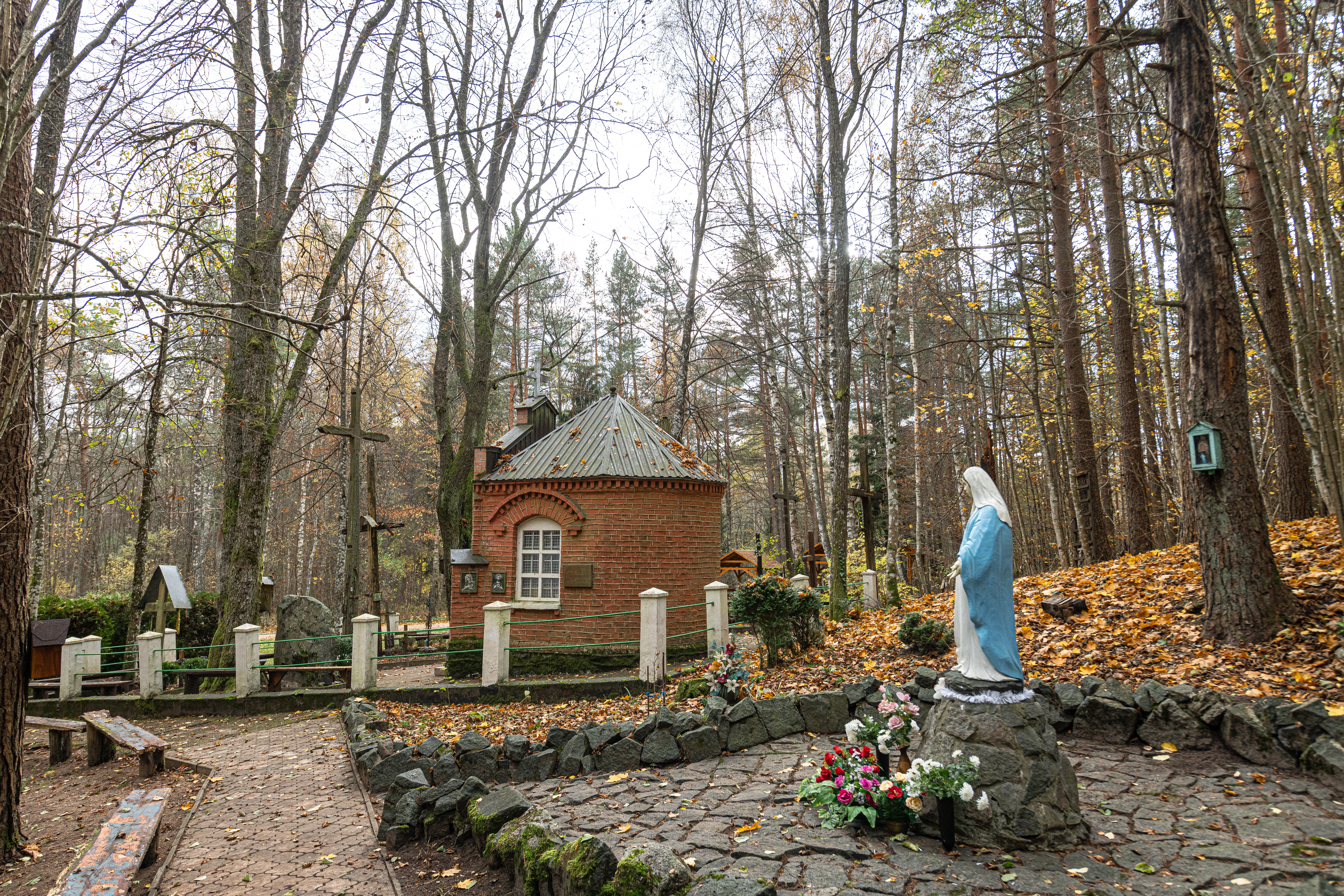

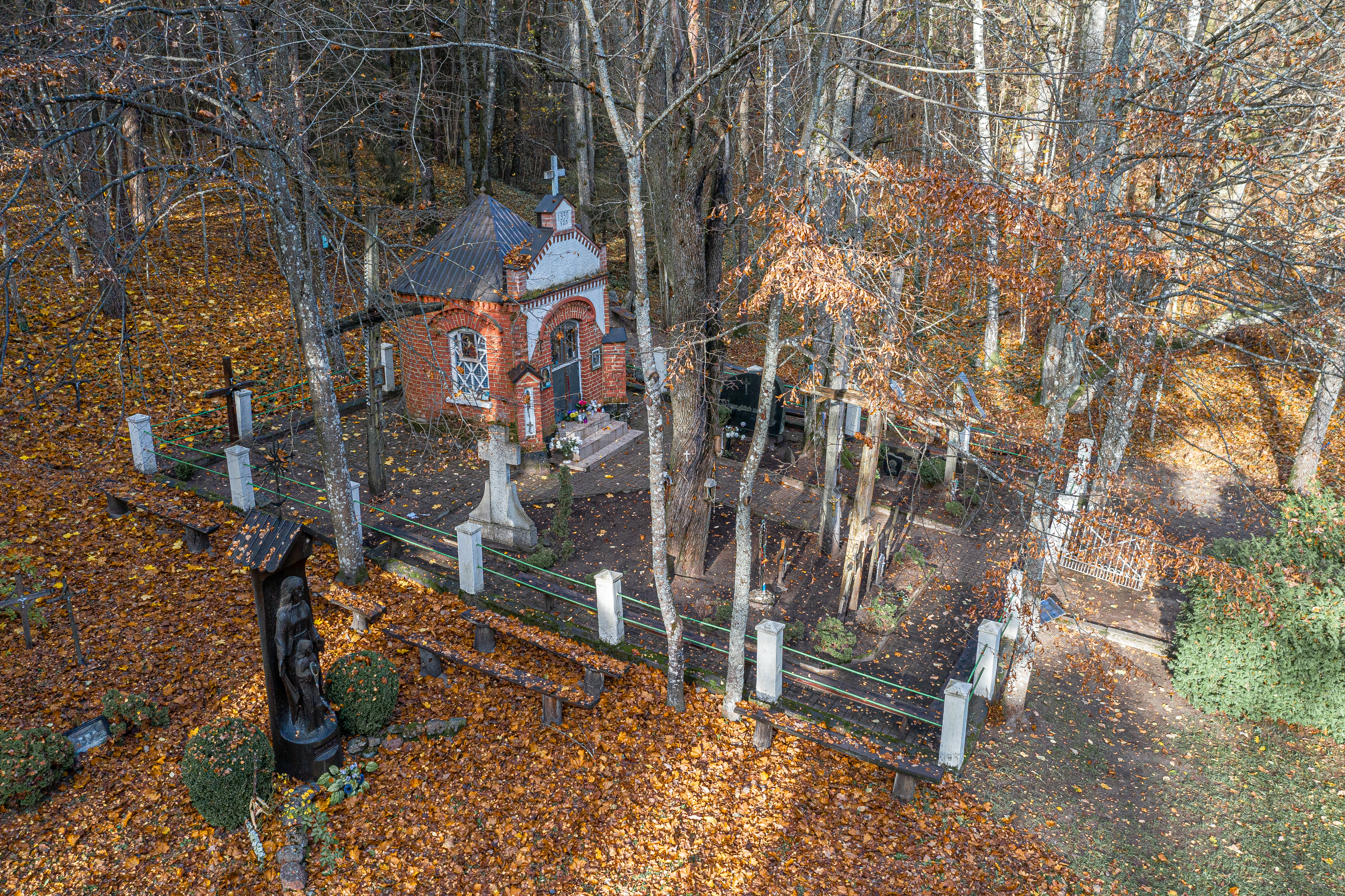
