= The Living Museum =

Art studio in New York City

Coordinates: 40.736°N 73.730°W

The Living Museum in Queens, New York City, United States, is an art studio dedicated to presenting the art produced by patients at the Creedmoor Psychiatric Center, the largest state psychiatric care institution in New York City. It is the first museum of its kind in the United States.

Jessica Yu's 1998 documentary The Living Museum profiles artists that were a part of the program such as Issa Ibrahim, who was released from Creedmoor in 2009.

== See also ==
- Outsider art
