= Issa Ibrahim =

American author and artist

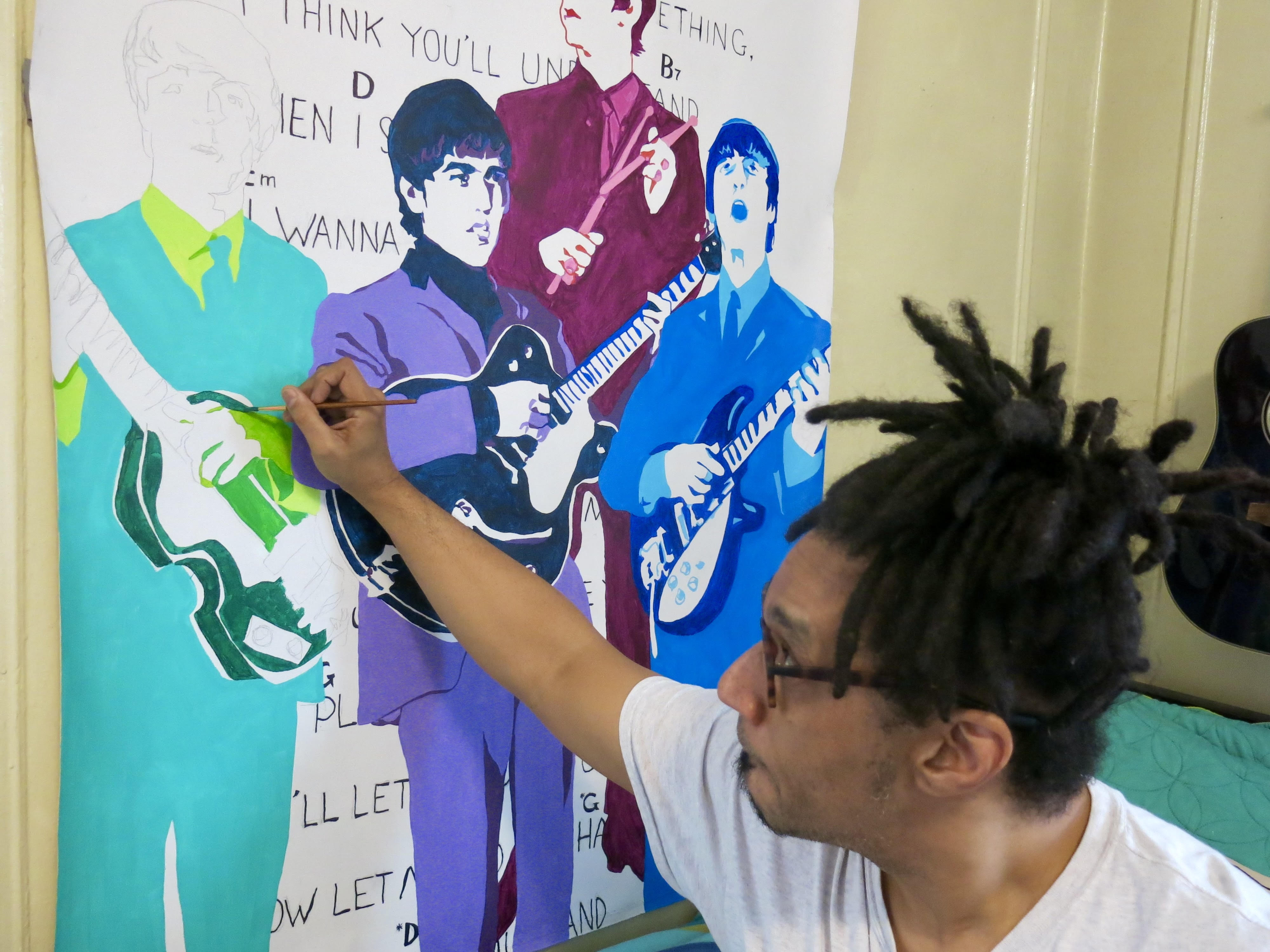
- Ibrahim in his studio in Queens in 2022
- Born: 1965 (age 60–61); Queens, New York, U.S.
- Education: High School of Art and Design, School of Visual Arts
- Occupations: Author; Outsider Artist; Musician
- Notable work: The Hospital Always Wins (memoir)
- Website: https://www.issaibrahim.net/

Issa Ibrahim (born 1965) is an American author and outsider artist from Jamaica, Queens who has been the subject of multiple news documentaries, most notably Jessica Yu's HBO documentary The Living Museum, which was nominated for the Grand Jury Prize at the 1999 Sundance Film Festival.

== Early life ==
Ibrahim was born in Queens, New York in 1965 to Audrey Phipps, an artist and part-time model, and John Edwin Johnson, a jazz musician. Johnson, who later became a member of the Nation of Islam and changed his name to Jamil Ibrahim, met Phipps in a jazz club in the early 1960s. Issa grew up amid the crack epidemic of the 1980s, which was particularly centered in African American communities of inner cities. He was exposed early on to the drug culture with his father's open substance use at home.

Ibrahim attended Manhattan's High School of Art and Design and later studied at the School of Visual Arts in New York City.

== Accidental killing ==
In February 1990, at the age of 24, Ibrahim accidentally killed his mother while experiencing a psychotic break after smoking marijuana. He accepted an insanity plea and was committed to Creedmoor Psychiatric Center, the largest state psychiatric institution in New York.

== Creedmoor Mental Hospital ==
At Creedmoor Ibrahim joined The Living Museum, an art program created in an abandoned building on the grounds of the hospital, and the backdrop for Yu's documentary. Self-taught, he began painting as a way to cope with the family tragedy, and over the years cultivated it into a marketable talent. While participating in the program he met his lifelong companion Susan, also an artist. Ibrahim was released from the hospital in 2009, nearly twenty years after he was committed. In an audio interview with NPR in 2013, he cited his desire to expose the realities of what he called "a broken mental health system," which he would later expand in his 2016 book The Hospital Always Wins.

== The Hospital Always Wins ==
In 2016 The Hospital Always Wins was released by Chicago Review Press. In it Ibrahim recounts his early development of mental illness, his 20-year stint at Creedmoor, and his long road to rehabilitation. The book also serves as a love letter to his mother, whom he remembers as "fun, quirky and nurturing." During bouts of loneliness as the youngest of five children, Ibrahim says she was "my best, closest, and perhaps only friend."

The Library Journal called it "Insightful, troubling, touching and poetic," and Kirkus Reviews said "It reveals both an irrepressible individual with a talent for survival and a mental health system in dire need of repair."

== News documentaries ==
Ibrahim appeared on the German public television program Selbstbestimmt (Self-determined) in 1997, his first televised interview following his mother's accidental death, speaking about the impact of The Living Museum on his recovery.

Radio producer Laura Starecheski told Ibrahim's story on NPR's State of the Re:Union in 2014, a compilation of over ten years of recordings of Ibrahim at the hospital. She won the Edward R. Murrow Award and Third Coast Director's Choice Award for Best News Documentary. The segment was also listed by Harvard University’s Nieman's Storyboard as one of the best audio narratives of 2014 in the United States, and Sharon Davis of Radio Doc Review called the documentary "a graphic insight into the thinking of a schizophrenic mind."

In 2016 Ibrahim appeared on the New York Public Radio talk show The Leonard Lopate Show to talk about his life and the recent release of his book.

== Painting and music ==
Ibrahim's paintings have appeared in numerous galleries and non-profit spaces since 2009, including regular showings at The Fountain House Gallery in Hell's Kitchen, an exhibition space featuring art from artists with mental illness. In 2016 Ibrahim released Patient's Rites, an autobiographical musical documentary about lessons learned at Creedmoor.
