= Simone D. =

American psychiatric patient

Simone D. is a pseudonym for a psychiatric patient in the Creedmoor Psychiatric Center in New York City, who in 2007 won a court ruling which set aside a two-year-old court order to give her electroshock treatment against her will. She spoke Spanish, but she was not transferred to a unit/facility that had Spanish-speaking clinicians. Her attorneys were Dennis Feld and Kim Darrow.
