= Creedmoor Psychiatric Center =

Psychiatric hospital in Queens, New York

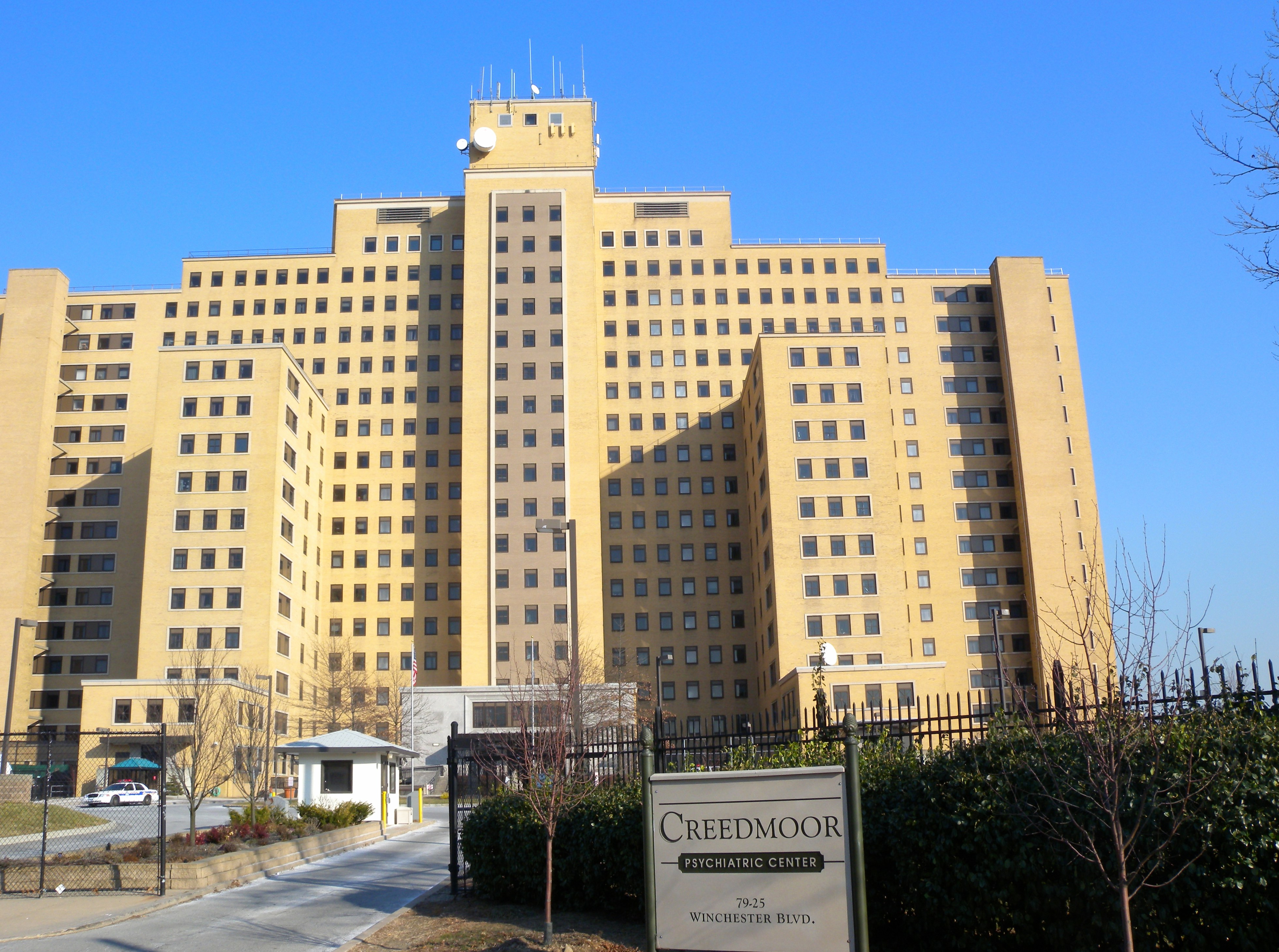
- Winchester Boulevard entrance

Geography
- Location: Queens Village, Queens, New York, United States
- Coordinates: 40°44′29″N 73°43′54″W

Organization
- Care system: Medicaid, private
- Type: Specialist
- Network: New York State Office of Mental Health

Services
- Speciality: Psychiatry

Links
- Lists: Hospitals in New York State
- Other links: Hospitals in Queens

Creedmoor Psychiatric Center is a psychiatric hospital at 79-26 Winchester Boulevard in Queens Village, Queens, New York, United States. It provides inpatient, outpatient, and residential services for severely mentally ill patients. The hospital occupies more than 300 acres (121 ha) and includes more than 50 buildings.

The site was named after the Creed family, which farmed on the site. It later was used as a firing range from the 1870s until 1892. The Farm Colony of Brooklyn State Hospital was opened on the site in 1912, with 32 patients. By 1959, the hospital housed 7,000 inpatients. The hospital's census declined by the early 1960s, and unused portions were sold off and developed into the Queens County Farm Museum, a school campus, and a children's psychiatric center.

== History ==
=== Site ===
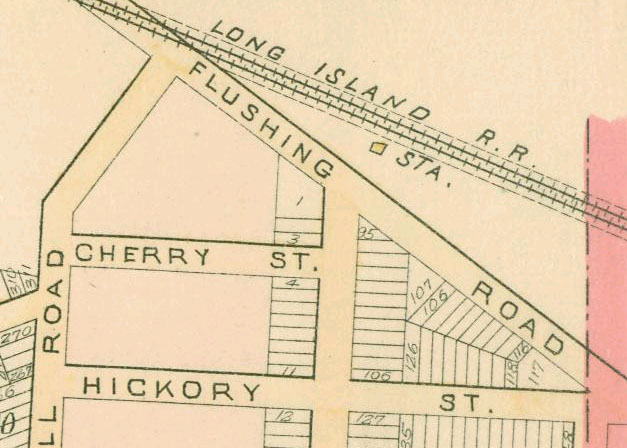
Creedmoor station in 1891

The hospital's name is a portmanteau derived from Creed - the name of the previous family who owned a farm at the site - and apparent geographical similarities to the British "moorlands". The local railroad station - on a line running from Long Island City to Bethpage - took the name "Creedmoor;" apparently coined by British visitors in reference to the local geography and former use of the site as a rifle range having been reminiscent of the moors back in Britain, owing to the designation "Creed's Moor." In the early 1870s, the state of New York purchased the land from the Creeds for a railway easement, later used by the National Guard and National Rifle Association of America (NRA) as a firing range. The Creedmoor Rifle Range hosted prestigious international shooting competitions, becoming the forerunner of the Palma Trophy competition. In 1892, as a result of declining public interest and mounting noise complaints from the growing neighborhood, the NRA deeded its land back to the state.

=== Hospital ===
In 1912, the Lunacy Commission of New York State opened the Farm Colony of Brooklyn State Hospital at the Creedmoor site, with 32 patients, in line with a trend for sending the growing number of urban psychiatric patients to the "fresh air" of outlying areas. Intakes at the former National Guard barracks rapidly expanded over the coming years, with a self-reported census reported a total of 150 inpatients housed at Creedmore by 1918. By 1959, the hospital housed 7,000 inpatients. Creedmoor was described as a "crowded, understaffed institution" in Susan Sheehan's biography Is There No Place On Earth For Me? (1982), detailing the experiences of pseudonymously-named Sylvia Frumkin. Dr. Lauretta Bender, a child neuropsychiatrist, was reported to have been practicing at the hospital between the 1950s and 1960s. In December 1977, one of Creedmoor's most notorious patients, former NYPD officer Robert Torsney, was committed to the hospital after being found not guilty by reason of insanity for the 1976 murder of then-15 year-old Randolph Evans in Brooklyn. Torsney was held at Creedmoor until his release in July 1979 following a psychiatric review which declared he was no longer a threat.

Intakes began to decline by the early 1960s in concert with the development of new psychiatric medications and push for deinstitutionalization of many psychiatric patients. In 1975, a site previously used to farm produce for the hospital at Creedmoor's Glen Oaks campus was opened to the public as the Queens County Farm Museum. Another part of the Glen Oaks campus was repurposed as the Queens Children's Psychiatric Center. In 2004, an additional site was redeveloped for Glen Oaks public school campus and The Queens High School of Teaching, and by 2006, all remaining parts of the Creedmoor campus were sold, with only 470 inpatients at the hospital. A more recent portrayal of Creedmoor appears in Katherine Olson's Something More Wrong (2013).

=== Later use ===
There are several unused buildings on the property, including the long-abandoned Building 25. Many parts of the building are covered in bird guano, the largest pile being several feet high. In August 2023, a shelter for migrants opened at Creedmoor Psychiatric Center, amid a sharp increase in the number of asylum seekers traveling to the city.

In February 2023, the Empire State Development Corporation announced that it would redevelop 55 acres (22 ha) of the Creedmoor site. The state government proposed 2,873 residences there that December; local residents objected that a land use planning review had not been conducted before the plans were announced. In response to the concerns from the local community board and neighboring civic groups, around 850 apartments were removed from the proposed high density development. In November 2025, the state government approved a plan to redevelop the site with 2,022 residences (half of which would be affordable housing) and school. At the time, the development's first phase was scheduled to take two or three years.

== Programs ==
The hospital's notable ventures include The Living Museum, which showcases artistic works by patients and is the first museum of its kind in the U.S.

== Notable people ==
=== Patients ===
- "Simone D.", pseudonym; patient who won a court ruling which set aside a 2-year-old court order to give her involuntary electroshock treatment
- Paul Abraham (1892–1960), composer; committed after a mental breakdown
- Mary Ellen O'Brien (1888–1964), mother of painter Elaine de Kooning; committed for a year after being reported for neglecting her children
- Bud Powell (1924–1966), jazz musician; committed for 11 months after a bar fight
- Woody Guthrie (1912–1967), folk musician; was hospitalized at Creedmoor until his death
- George Metesky (1903–1994), serial bomber; committed to Creedmoor in 1973 and released the same year
- Joseph Baldi (1941–2009), serial killer; treated for mental illness
- Robert Tornsey (1945–2009), police officer responsible for the Shooting of Randolph Evans; released in 1979
- Peter Grudzien (1941–2013), country musician; committed with his sister for schizophrenic treatment
- Issa Ibrahim (b.1965), committed in 1990 for the accidental killing of his mother.

=== Staff ===
- Peter Orlovsky (1933–2010), actor; worked as an orderly
- Arthur M. Sackler (1913–1987), psychiatrist; completed his residency in psychiatry at Creedmoor and was director of research; was a co-founder along with his brothers Raymond and Mortimer

=== Other ===
- Joshua Bloch (1890–1957), rabbi; died of a heart attack at Creedmoor while delivering a Rosh Hashanah sermon as a chaplain of the New York State Department of Mental Hygiene that operated the hospital
- Grace Marilynn James (1923–1989), pediatrician; studied child psychology at Creedmoor
