= Susan Sheehan =

American writer (1937–2026)

- Born: Susanna Maria Sachsel; August 24, 1937; Vienna, Austria
- Died: February 17, 2026 (aged 88); Washington, D.C., U.S.
- Spouse(s): Forrest Black II (m. 1959, divorced) Neil Sheehan (m. 1965; died 2021)
- Children: 2
- Writing career
- Notable work: Is There No Place on Earth for Me?
- Notable awards: Pulitzer Prize for General Nonfiction (1983)

Susanna Maria Sheehan (née Sachsel; August 24, 1937 – February 17, 2026) was an American writer.

== Life and career ==
Born in Vienna, Austria, on August 24, 1937, she won the 1983 Pulitzer Prize for General Nonfiction for her book Is There No Place on Earth for Me? The book details the experiences of a young New York City woman diagnosed with schizophrenia. Portions of the book were published in The New Yorker, where she was a frequent contributor. Her work as a contributing writer also appeared in The New York Times and Architectural Digest.

In 1986, Sheehan published in The New Yorker "A Missing Plane," a three-part series about the U.S. Army's attempt to identify the remains of the victims of a 1944 airplane crash.

Her husband was the journalist Neil Sheehan, whom she urged to copy what became known as the Pentagon Papers for the Times with her help, and who also won a Pulitzer Prize for General Nonfiction for A Bright Shining Lie: John Paul Vann and America in Vietnam in 1989. The two lived in Washington, D.C. until his death in 2021.

She died in Washington, DC, on February 17, 2026, at the age of 88.

== Works ==
Her other works include:

- 1967 Ten Vietnamese
- 1976 A welfare mother
- 1978 A prison and a prisoner
- 1984 Kate Quinton's days
- 1986 A missing plane
- 1993 Life for Me Ain't Been No Crystal Stair
- 2002 The Banana Sculptor, the Purple Lady, and the All-Night Swimmer: Hobbies, Collecting, and Other Passionate Pursuits (co-written with Howard Means)
