= Killing of Randolph Evans =

1976 police shooting of a child in New York City

Randolph Evans (1961 – 1976) was a 15-year-old ninth-grade boy at Franklin K. Lane High School in Brooklyn. He was shot and killed by NYPD officer Robert Torsney on November 25, 1976.

== Shooting ==
On Thanksgiving Day 1976, responding to a report of a man with a gun in the Cypress Hills housing projects, Officer Robert Torsney encountered a group of youths. After a brief conversation, Torsney shot one of them, Evans, point-blank in the head.

After shooting Evans, Torsney made no effort to check the boy’s condition. but instead walked to his patrol car, got in, removed the spent cartridge from his weapon, and calmly replaced it with another bullet. His partner, Officer Matthew Williams had already been in the vehicle during the shooting, and asked, "What did you do?" Torsney responded, "I don't know, Matty. What did I do?" He was then arrested by his fellow officers.

== Legal proceedings ==
On the day of the funeral, Torsney was indicted by a grand jury on charges of second-degree murder. The trial began in October, 1977, where his defense maintained that the killing resulted from a psychotic episode due to "automatism of Penfield", named for neurosurgeon Wilder Penfield. On November 30, 1977, one year after the funeral, Torsney was found not guilty by reason of insanity. Torsney was remanded to Creedmoor Psychiatric Center in Queens.

On December 20, 1978, a Brooklyn State Supreme Court ordered Torsney's release, stating he no longer posed a threat to society. On the following July 9, 1979, Torsney was released from Creedmoor but under many rules and restrictions, including no legal possession of any firearms, ammunition, or explosives, no association with known criminals, no employment in law enforcement or other public safety professions, no attempts to contact Randolph's relatives or any known friends or acquaintances, and submitting to outpatient treatment at Creedmoor for the next five years with possible revocation of his release if deemed necessary for his or others' safety. Robert Torsney died in 2009, 30 years after his release from Creedmoor.

The Torsney case was mentioned by Bob Herbert in his New York Times column after the shooting of Sean Bell which took place exactly 30 years to the day after the killing of Evans.

== See also ==
- List of unarmed African Americans killed by law enforcement officers in the United States
