= Darbėnai =

- Town
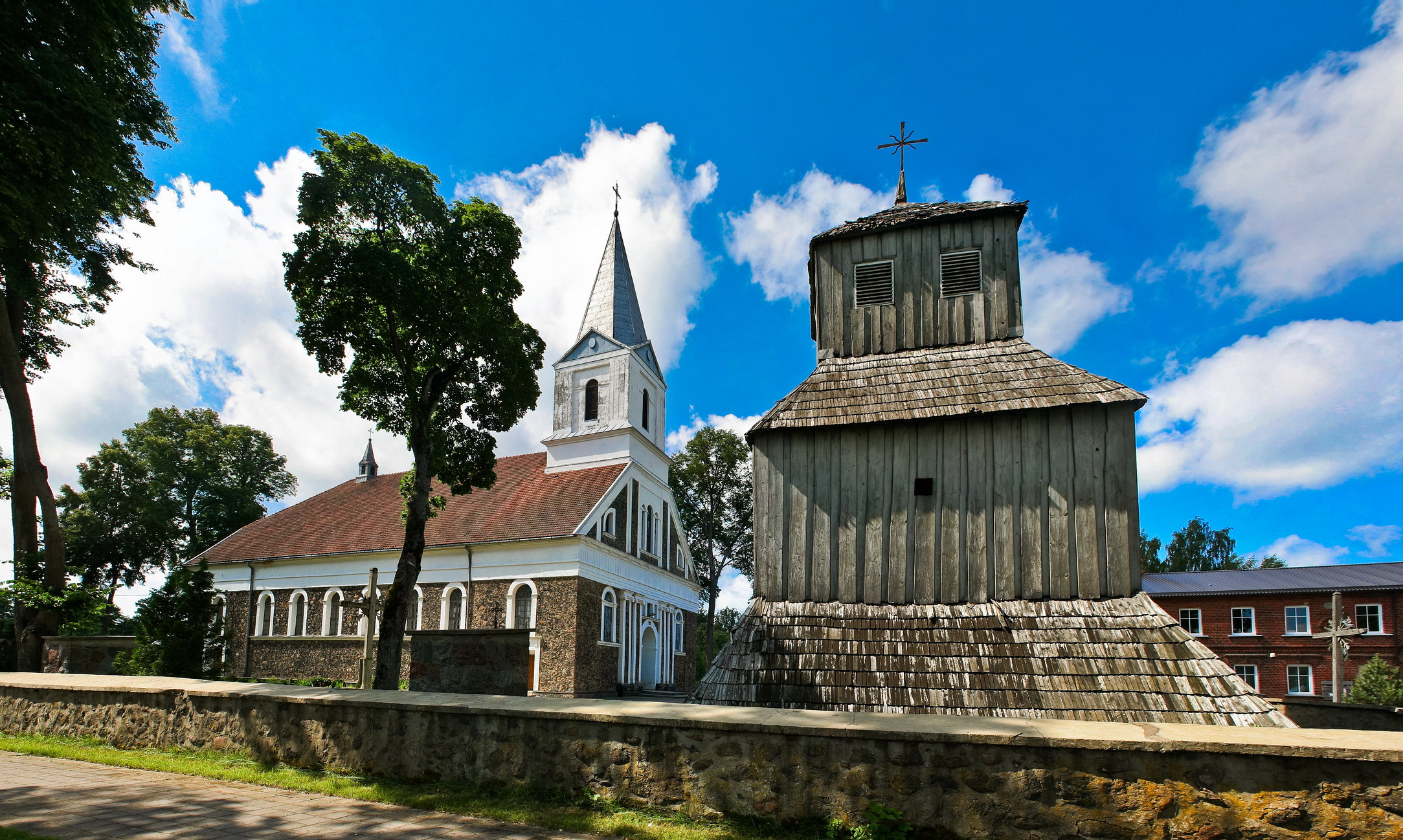

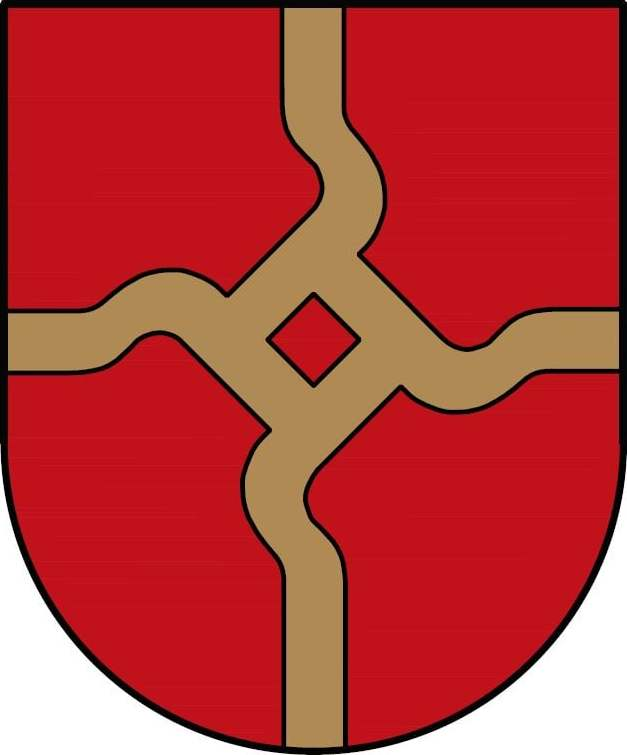
- Coat of arms

- Location within Lithuania
- Coordinates: 56°01′20″N 21°15′30″E
- Country: Lithuania
- County: Klaipėda County

Area
  - Total: 138.6 km^{2} (53.5 sq mi)

Population (2021)
  - Total: 1,203
- Time zone: UTC+2 (EET)
  - Summer (DST): UTC+3 (EEST)

Darbėnai is a small town in Klaipėda County, in northwestern Lithuania. According to the 2011 census, the town has a population of 1,461 people. It is located 16 km north of Kretinga. Darbėnai is the capital of Darbėnai eldership.

== History ==
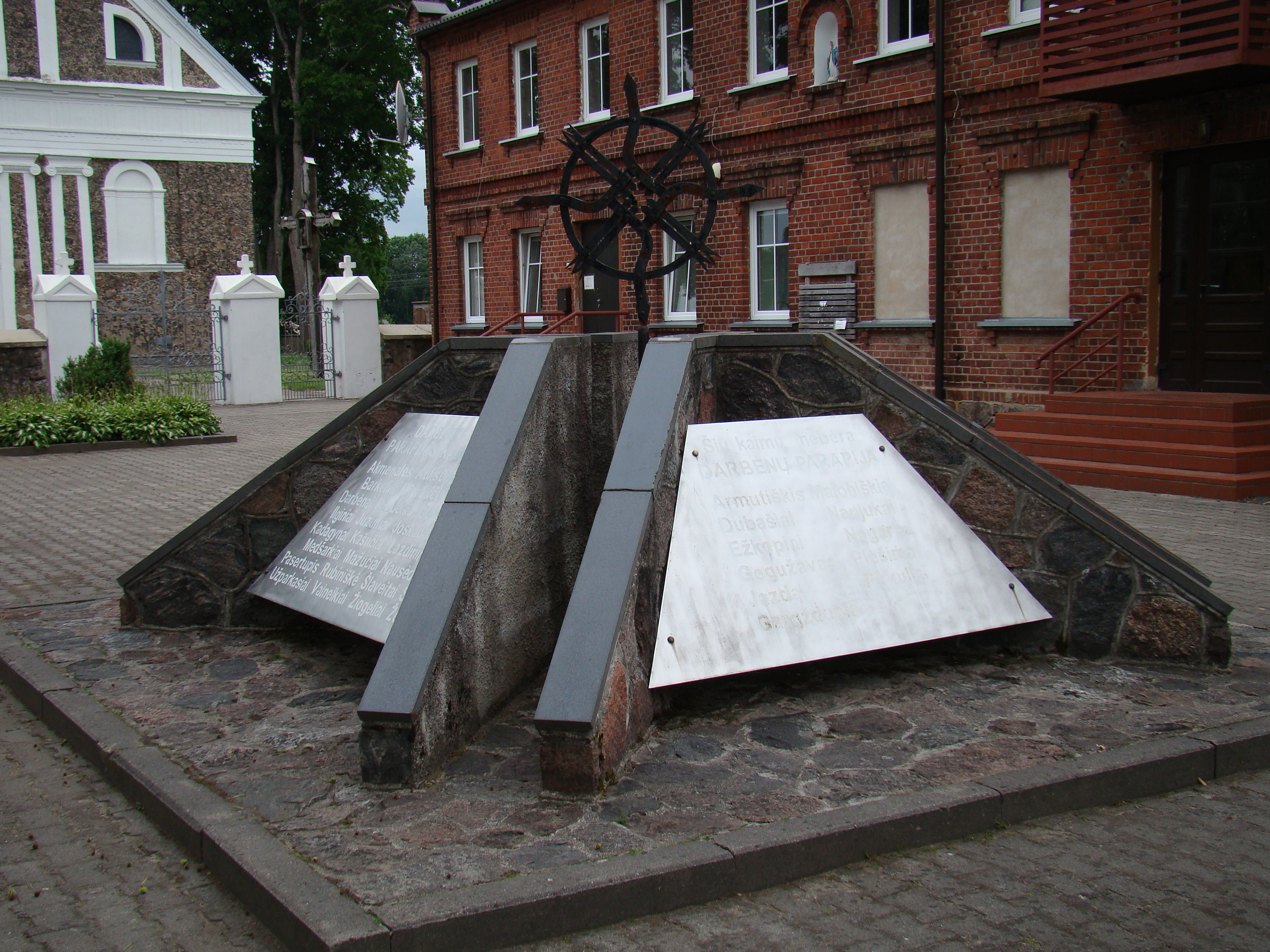
Stone-made monument in Darbėnai Metrika

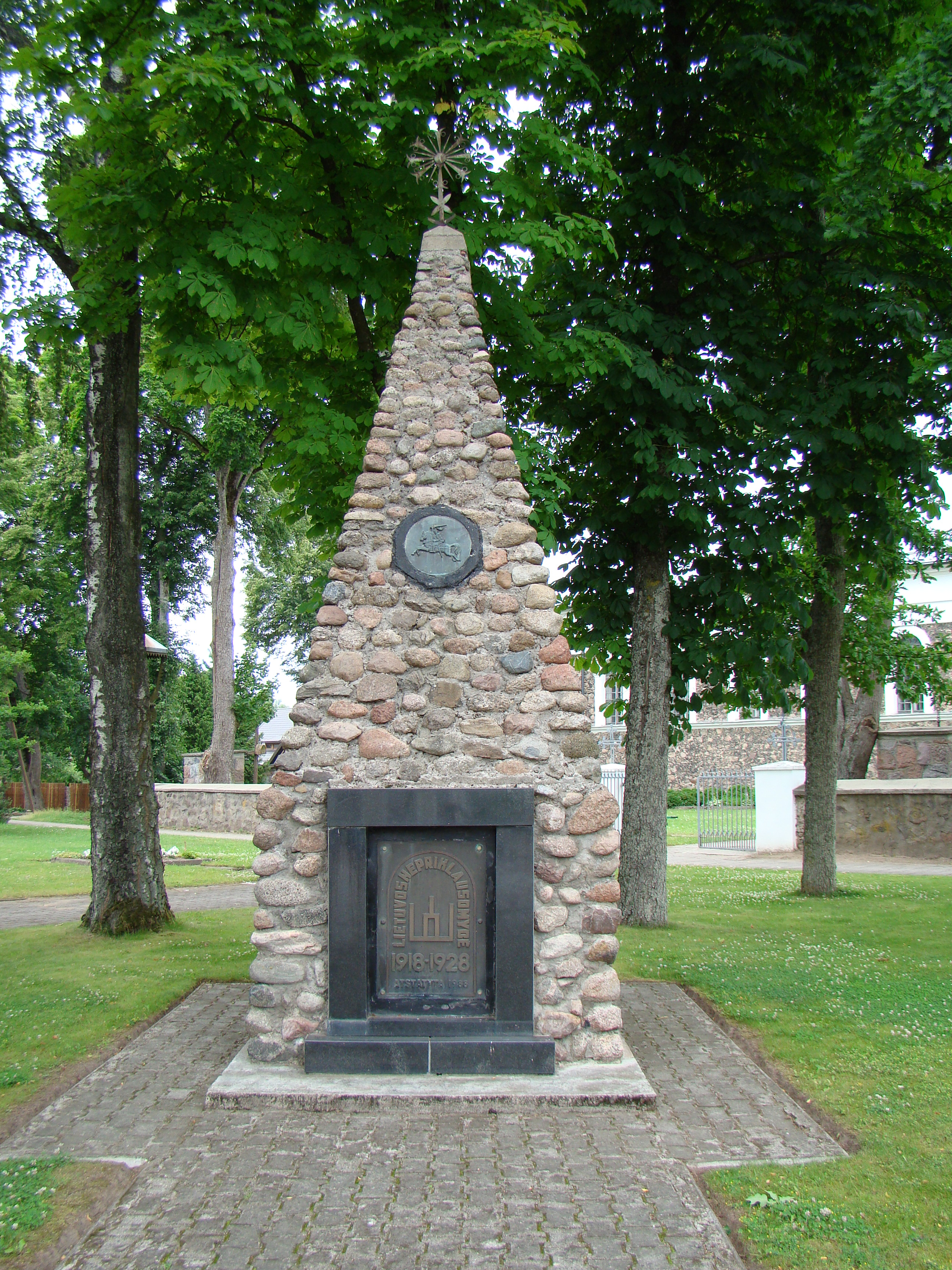
Independence Monument built in 1930

Darbėnai was first mentioned in 1591 but it is thought that the village was established in 1566 during the Wallach reform. According to Simonas Daukantas in 1550 it was still a Palanga forest (Palangos giria). In 1621 Jan Karol Chodkiewicz built the first wooden church in the town. In 1701 the duke of Courland granted the privilege of trade to the town which was confirmed by the king Augustus II the Strong. Since 1730 Darbėnai was started to call a town.

In the beginning of the 19th century, the first parish school was established. In 1842 the current Catholic church named after Saint Apostles Peter and Paul was built. In 1855 the first public primary school was opened. Darbėnai was an important centre during the 1831 Uprising however the town burned during the battles. Since 1861 Darbėnai became the centre of volost.

In 1897 there lived 2059 inhabitants. The post office was opened in 1906. In 1923 Darbėnai had 1018 inhabitants and in 1936 - 1921 inhabitants. In 1930 there was built the Independence Monument (it was destroyed in 1962 and rebuilt in 1989). Just before World War II, there were around 800 Jews in Darbėnai (about 80% of all residents). They were mostly traders and craftsmen. There was a synagogue, a Jewish meeting house, several schools, a Jewish library, local bureaus of Zionists and social democrats, theatre and sports clubs in Darbėnai.

The German Army occupied on June 24, 1941. With the help of local collaborators, they executed more than 500 Jews at the edge of the forest outside the city.

During the years of Soviet occupation Darbėnai was the central settlement of kolkhoz. In 1944–1952 Darbėnai environs, Vaineikiai forest Lithuanian partisans had a staff of Kardas (The Sword) detachment belonging to Žemaičiai military district.

Nowadays Darbėnai is the capital of Darbėnai eldership. The old town of Darbėnai is an urbanistic monument. There operates a post office, public library, kindergarten, gymnasium, hospital, pharmacy, home of culture, forester's administration etc.

== Origin of the name ==
Darbėnai was called after the river Darba which flows near the town.

== Notable people ==
- David Wolffsohn (1856–1914) a Lithuanian-Jewish businessman, prominent early Zionist
- Kazys Maksvytis (born 1977) a basketball coach, who currently works for Žalgiris
- Mindaugas Rojus (born 1981) a Lithuanian opera singer
- Joshua Bloch (1890–1957) a rabbi and librarian
- The grandmother of Mark Cuban, American entrepreneur and NBA club owner, hails from Darbėnai.
