= Vydmantai =

- Village
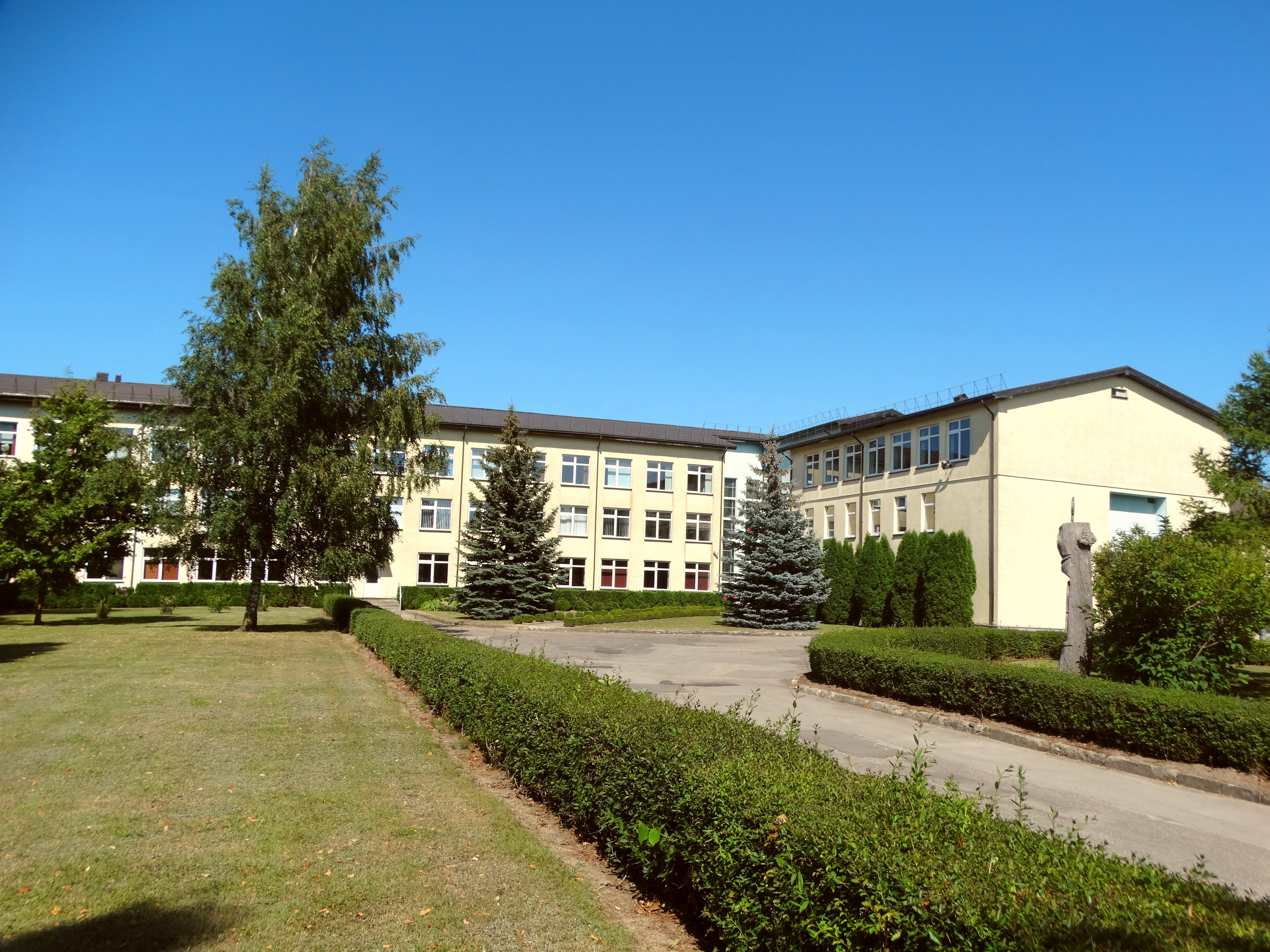
- Vydmantai gymnasium

- Location in Lithuania
- Country: Lithuania
- Ethnographic region: Samogitia
- County: Klaipėda County
- Municipality: Kretinga district municipality
- Eldership: Vydmantai eldership

Population (2021)
  - Total: 1,627
- Time zone: UTC+2 (EET)
  - Summer (DST): UTC+3 (EEST)

Vydmantai is a village in Kretinga district municipality, in Klaipėda County, in western Lithuania. According to the Lithuanian census of 2021, the village had a population of 1627 people.

In 1978, a village of Virkštininkai was incorporated into Vydmantai.

Vydmantai village is located c. 5 kilometres (3.1 mi) from Palanga, 9 kilometres (5.6 mi) from Kretinga, 29 kilometres (18 mi) from Klaipėda.
