= Kretinga District Municipality =

Kretinga District Municipality Kretingos rajono savivaldybė
- Municipality
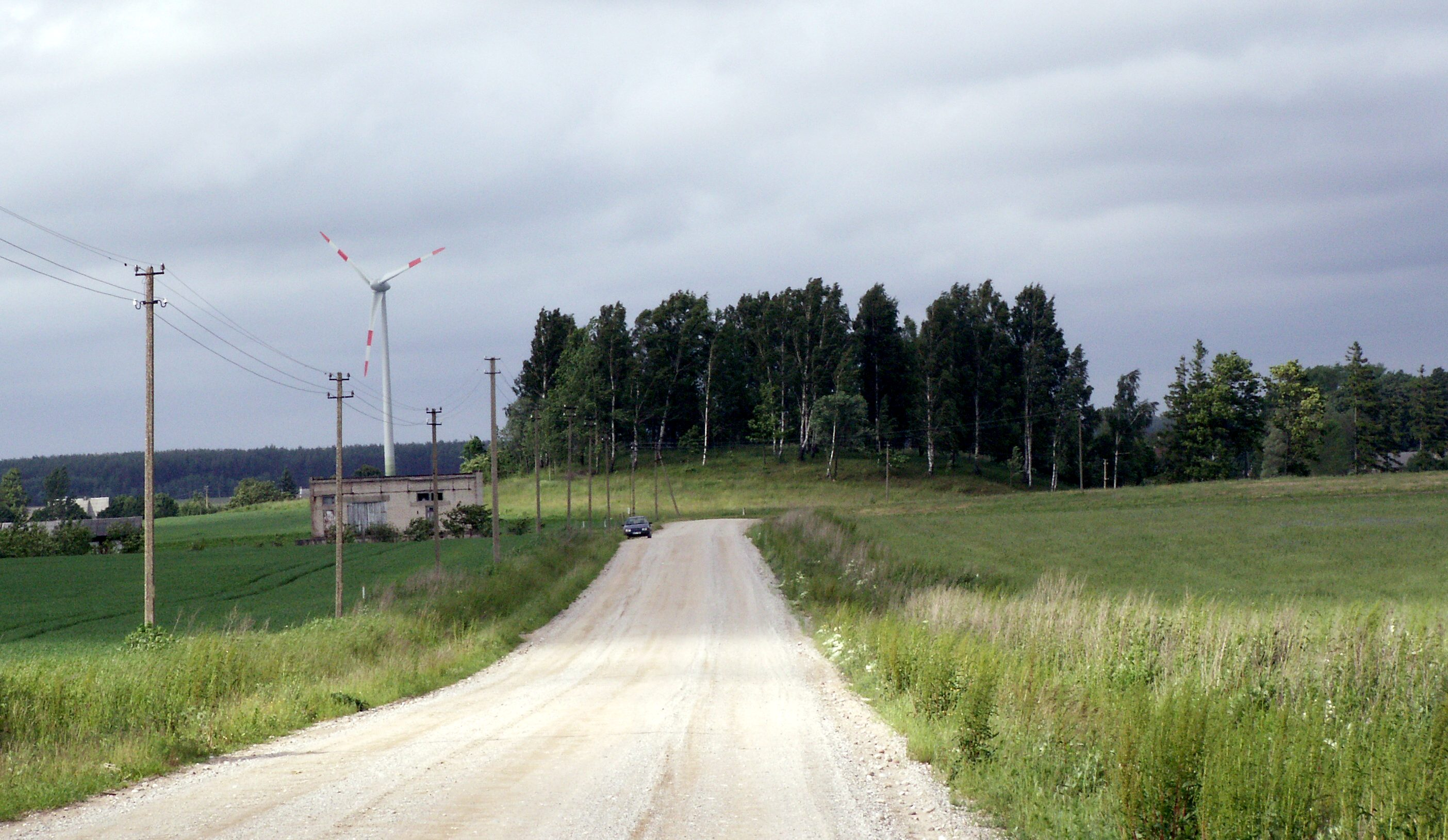
- Landscape near Rūdaičiai

- Coat of arms

- Location of Kretinga district municipality within Lithuania

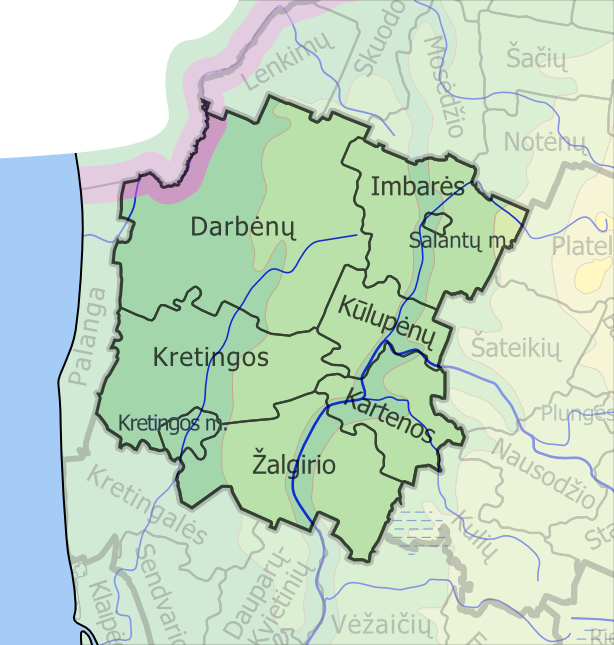
- Map of Kretinga district municipality
- Country: Lithuania
- Ethnographic region: Samogitia
- County: Klaipėda County
- Established: 1950
- Capital: Kretinga
- Elderships: 8

Government
  - Mayor: Antanas Kalnius (2019–)

Area
  - Total: 989 km^{2} (382 sq mi)
  - Rank: 39th

Population (2021)
  - Total: 37,639
  - Rank: 22nd
  - Density: 38.1/km^{2} (98.6/sq mi)
  - Rank: 15th
- Time zone: UTC+2 (EET)
  - Summer (DST): UTC+3 (EEST)
- Telephone code: 445
- Major settlements: Kretinga (pop. 17,249); Vydmantai (pop. 1,627); Salantai (pop. 1,259)
- Website: www.kretinga.lt

Kretinga District Municipality is one of 60 municipalities in Lithuania.

== Locations in Kretinga District Municipality ==
- Erškėtynas Stream and Chapel
- Gargždelė
- Kretinga
- Salantai

== Elderships ==
Kretinga District Municipality is divided into 9 elderships:

Eldership (Administrative Center)	Area	Population (2021)
Darbėnai (Darbėnai)	327 km^{2} (80,803.46 acres; 126.26 sq mi)	3,863
Imbarė (Salantai)	149.2 km^{2} (36,868.12 acres; 57.61 sq mi)	1,689
Kartena (Kartena)	85.4 km^{2} (21,102.80 acres; 32.97 sq mi)	1,433
Kretinga Town(Kretinga)	15.6 km^{2} (3,854.84 acres; 6.02 sq mi)	17,249
Kretinga (Kretinga)	144.7 km^{2} (35,756.15 acres; 55.87 sq mi)	4,849
Kulupėnai (Kulupėnai)	69 km^{2} (17,050.27 acres; 26.64 sq mi)	1,407
Salantai Town (Salantai)	3.2 km^{2} (790.74 acres; 1.24 sq mi)	1,272
Vydmantai (Vydmantai)	30.4 km^{2} (7,512.00 acres; 11.74 sq mi)	2,239
Žalgiris (Raguviškiai)	164.6 km^{2} (40,673.55 acres; 63.55 sq mi)	3,638
