= The Three Tenors: Paris 1998 =

- (Left to right) José Carreras, Plácido Domingo, Luciano Pavarotti, and James Levine

Live album by The Three Tenors
- Released: 18 August 1998
- Recorded: 10 July 1998, Paris
- Genre: Opera
- Length: 1:14:16
- Label: Atlantic / Warner Music
- Producers: Tibor Rudas, Christopher Raeburn

The Three Tenors chronology
The Three Tenors in Concert 1994 (1994)	The Three Tenors: Paris 1998 (1998)	The Three Tenors Christmas (2000)

Singles from The Three Tenors: Paris 1998
- 1. "You'll Never Walk Alone"

Professional ratings
Review scores
Source	Rating
AllMusic	4/5 stars

The Three Tenors: Paris 1998 (re-released with the subtitle The Concert of the Century) is a live album by José Carreras, Plácido Domingo, and Luciano Pavarotti with conductor James Levine. The album was recorded at a Three Tenors concert on 10 July 1998 during celebrations for the FIFA World Cup. The concert took place in front of the Eiffel Tower on the Champ de Mars in Paris, France. The Orchestre de Paris accompanied the singers. The audience at the live concert numbered around 150,000 people. A sound system and large screens were placed along the Champ de Mars for the crowds further back to see and hear the performance. Producer Tibor Rudas claimed prior to the concert that 2 billion viewers were expected to watch the televised performance worldwide.

As in their two previous recorded concerts in Rome in 1990 and Los Angeles in 1994, Spanish tenors Carreras and Domingo and their Italian colleague Pavarotti performed a variety of operatic arias, Neapolitan songs, zarzuela romanzas, art songs, and popular music. Atlantic Records and Warner Music jointly released the audio version of the concert on 18 August 1998, while Universal Music and Decca Records released the video album on VHS and DVD. The album went gold in the United States and France.

== Track listing ==
No.	Title	Song Information	Length
1.	"Io conosco un giardino" (sung by José Carreras)	from Maristella by Giuseppe Pietri	2:11
2.	"Amor ti vieta" (sung by Plácido Domingo)	from Act II of Fedora by Umberto Giordano	1:52
3.	"Granada" (sung by Luciano Pavarotti)	written by Agustín Lara	3:00
4.	"Jeg elsker Dig (I Love but Thee)" (sung by José Carreras)	written by Edvard Grieg	2:50
5.	"Memoires de Danton" (sung by Plácido Domingo)	written by Plácido Domingo Jr.	4:02
6.	"Caruso" (sung by Luciano Pavarotti)	written by Lucio Dalla	5:27
7.	"Sous le ciel de Paris (Under Paris Skies)" (sung by The Three Tenors)	written by Jean Dréjac and Hubert Giraud	1:55
8.	"Solamente una vez" (sung by The Three Tenors)	written by Agustín Lara	2:08
9.	"Maria, Mari" (sung by The Three Tenors)	written by Eduardo di Capua	1:45
10.	"Torero quiero" (sung by The Three Tenors)	from El gato montés by Manuel Penella	1:05
11.	"Parlami d'amore" (sung by The Three Tenors)	written by Cesare Andrea Bixio	2:49
12.	"Tu, ca'nun chiagne!" (sung by The Three Tenors)	written by Ernesto de Curtis	2:36
13.	"Manhã de Carnaval" (sung by The Three Tenors)	written by Luiz Bonfá / Antônio Maria	2:24
14.	"Ti voglio tanto bene" (sung by The Three Tenors)	written by Ernesto de Curtis / Domenico Furno	3:12
15.	"Voce 'e notte!" (sung by José Carreras)	written by Ernesto de Curtis	3:39
16.	"Quiero Desterrar de Tu Pecho el Temor" (sung by Plácido Domingo)	from La del Soto del Parral by Reveriano Soutullo / Juan Vert	4:52
17.	"Nessun Dorma" (sung by Luciano Pavarotti)	from Act III of Turandot by Giacomo Puccini	2:58
18.	"Parce que (Because)" (sung by The Three Tenors)	written by Frank Teschemacher / Guy d'Hardelot	2:05
19.	"O sole mio" (sung by The Three Tenors)	written by Eduardo di Capua	2:01
20.	"'O surdato 'nnammurato" (sung by The Three Tenors)	written by Aniello Califano / Enrico Cannio	1:54
21.	"Ay, Ay, Ay" (sung by The Three Tenors)	written by Osmán Pérez Freire	3:09
22.	"Lolita" (sung by The Three Tenors)	written by Arturo Buzzi-Peccia	2:36
23.	"Ständchen" (sung by The Three Tenors)	composed by Franz Schubert	3:13
24.	"Dicitencello vuje" (sung by The Three Tenors)	written by Rodolfo Falvo	3:34
25.	"Core 'ngrato (Catari)" (sung by The Three Tenors)	written by Salvatore Cardillo	3:35
26.	"You'll Never Walk Alone" (sung by The Three Tenors)	written by Oscar Hammerstein II / Richard Rodgers	3:24

Tracks 7–14 and 18-26 are medleys.

== Chart performance ==
Chart (1998)	Peak position
Australia	16
Austria	8
Belgium (Flanders)	14
Belgium (Wallonia)	8
Dutch	27
Finnish	23
France	6
Germany	3
New Zealand	10
Swedwn	39
Swiss	10
UK	14
US	83
US Classical	1

=== Year-end charts ===
Chart (1998)	Position
German Albums Chart	81

== Certifications ==
=== Audio album certification ===
Region	Certification	Certified units/sales
Austria (IFPI Austria)	Gold	25,000^{*}
France (SNEP)	Gold	100,000^{*}
Switzerland (IFPI Switzerland)	Gold	25,000^{^}
United Kingdom (BPI)	Silver	60,000^{^}
United States (RIAA)	Gold	500,000^{^}
^{*} Sales figures based on certification alone.^{^} Shipments figures based on certification alone.

=== Video album certification ===
Region	Certification	Certified units/sales
France (SNEP)	Platinum	20,000^{*}
United Kingdom (BPI)	Gold	25,000^{^}
United States (RIAA)	Gold	50,000^{^}
^{*} Sales figures based on certification alone.^{^} Shipments figures based on certification alone.

== Personnel ==
- José Carreras, vocals
- Plácido Domingo, vocals
- Luciano Pavarotti, vocals
- James Levine, conductor
- Orchestre de Paris, orchestra
- Lalo Schifrin, arranger
