= The Three Tenors in Concert 1994 =

- Carreras, Domingo, Pavarotti, and Mehta

Live album by the Three Tenors
- Released: August 30, 1994
- Recorded: July 16, 1994, Los Angeles
- Venue: Dodger Stadium
- Genre: Opera
- Length: 1:50:14
- Label: Atlantic / Teldec / Warner Music
- Producers: Tibor Rudas, Christopher Raeburn

The Three Tenors chronology
| Carreras Domingo Pavarotti in Concert (1990) | The Three Tenors in Concert 1994 (1994) | The Three Tenors: Paris 1998 (1998) |

Singles from The Three Tenors in Concert 1994
- 1. "Libiamo" / "La donna è mobile"

Professional ratings
Review scores
| Source | Rating |
|---|---|
| Music Week | 5/5 stars |

The Three Tenors in Concert 1994 is a live album by José Carreras, Plácido Domingo and Luciano Pavarotti with conductor Zubin Mehta. The album was recorded on July 16, 1994, at the Three Tenors concert, at Dodger Stadium, in Los Angeles with the Los Angeles Philharmonic and the chorus of the Los Angeles Opera on the eve of the 1994 FIFA World Cup final. An estimated 1.3 billion viewers watched the concert as a television broadcast special across the world.

This concert has been released on home video formats, and re-released on Streaming Video formats on 2019.

== Reception ==
The AllMusic reviewer wrote that the singers displayed "vitality and pizzazz" during the concert. The reviewer remarked on the oddity of a concert by classical musicians held in a sports stadium, but nonetheless believed that the popularity of the tenors made the venue less "ludicrous". The reviewer also found them to be in "fine form" in regard to their singing and singled out certain numbers for praise: Domingo's "Granada," Carreras' "O souverain, o juge, o père," and Pavarotti's "Nessun dorma", as well as "La donna è mobile" and "Libiamo ne' lieti calici", which all three men sang together.

== Track listing ==
| No. | Title | Song Information | Length |
|---|---|---|---|
| 1. | "The Star-Spangled Banner" (directed by Zubin Mehta) | lyric by Francis Scott Key music John Stafford Smith | 1:24 |
| 2. | "Candide" (directed by Zubin Mehta) | by Leonard Bernstein | 4:14 |
| 3. | "O souverain, ô juge, ô père" (sung by José Carreras) | Act III, Scene 3 of Le Cid by Jules Massenet | 5:00 |
| 4. | "Quando le sere al placido" (sung by Plácido Domingo) | from Luisa Miller composed by Giuseppe Verdi | 5:19 |
| 5. | "Pourquoi me réveiller" (sung by Luciano Pavarotti) | Act III of Werther by Jules Massenet | 2:38 |
| 6. | "With A Song In My Heart" (sung by José Carreras) | from Spring Is Here by Rodgers and Hart | 3:15 |
| 7. | "Granada" (sung by Plácido Domingo) | written by Agustín Lara | 3:35 |
| 8. | "Non ti scordar di me" (sung by Luciano Pavarotti) | written by Ernesto De Curtis | 3:19 |
| 9. | "My Way" (sung by The Three Tenors) | music by Claude François and Jacques Revaux, English lyrics by Paul Anka | 4:01 |
| 10. | "Moon River" (sung by The Three Tenors) | composed by Johnny Mercer (lyrics) and Henry Mancini (music) | 1:38 |
| 11. | "Because" (sung by The Three Tenors) | by Guy d'Hardelot | 2:23 |
| 12. | "Singin' in the Rain" (sung by The Three Tenors) | lyrics by Arthur Freed and music by Nacio Herb Brown | 2:18 |
| 14. | "Tu, ca nun chiagne" (sung by José Carreras) | written by Ernesto De Curtis | 2:55 |
| 15. | "Amor, vida de mi vida" (sung by Plácido Domingo) | from Maravilla composed by Federico Moreno Torroba | 3:21 |
| 16. | "Ave Maria" (sung by Luciano Pavarotti) | composed by Franz Schubert | 3:34 |
| 17. | "E lucevan le stelle" (sung by José Carreras) | from Tosca composed by Giacomo Puccini | 2:47 |
| 18. | "Vesti la giubba" (sung by Plácido Domingo) | Act I of Pagliacci, written and composed by Ruggero Leoncavallo | 2:38 |
| 19. | "Nessun dorma" (sung by Luciano Pavarotti) | Act III of Turandot by Giacomo Puccini | 3:24 |
| 20. | "America" (sung by The Three Tenors) | Act I of West Side Story, composed by Leonard Bernstein; lyrics by Stephen Sondheim | 0:54 |
| 21. | "All I Ask of You" (sung by The Three Tenors) | Act I of The Phantom of the Opera, by Andrew Lloyd Webber | 1:59 |
| 22. | "Funiculì Funiculà" (sung by The Three Tenors) | composed by Luigi Denza | 1:21 |
| 23. | "Sous les ponts de Paris (Around the World)" (sung by The Three Tenors) | composed by Vincent Scotto | 2:00 |
| 24. | "Aquarela do Brasil" (sung by The Three Tenors) | written by Ary Barroso | 1:26 |
| 25. | "Be My Love" (sung by The Three Tenors) | music by Nicholas Brodzsky, lyrics by Sammy Cahn | 1:48 |
| 26. | "Marechiare" (sung by The Three Tenors) | written by Paolo Tosti | 3:09 |
| 27. | "Lippen Schweigen" (sung by The Three Tenors) | composed by Franz Lehár | 2:37 |
| 28. | "Santa Lucia luntana" (sung by The Three Tenors) | written by E. A. Mario | 3:27 |
| 29. | "Those Were the Days" (sung by The Three Tenors) | lyrics by Gene Raskin | 2:21 |
| 30. | "Te Quiero Dijiste" (sung by The Three Tenors) | by María Grever | 2:28 |
| 31. | "Torna a Surriento" (sung by The Three Tenors) | composed by Ernesto De Curtis | 3:51 |
| 32. | "La donna è mobile" (sung by The Three Tenors) | Act III of Rigoletto by Giuseppe Verdi | 2:16 |
| 33. | "Libiamo ne' lieti calici" (sung by The Three Tenors) | Act I of La traviata by Giuseppe Verdi | 3:20 |
| 34. | "Nessun dorma" (sung by The Three Tenors) | Act III of Turandot by Giacomo Puccini | 3:24 |

Tracks 9–12 are a medley titled "A Tribute to Hollywood", and Tracks 20–31 are a medley titled "Around the World", both arranged and orchestrated by Lalo Schifrin. Tracks 31-34 are Encore.

== Omissions ==
Not included in the album were these three numbers sung (between 11 and 12 above) at the concert:

| No. | Title | Song Information | Length |
|---|---|---|---|
| 1. | "Amor, vida de mi vida" (sung by Plácido Domingo) | composed by Federico Moreno Torroba | 3:16 |
| 2. | "Ave Maria" (sung by Luciano Pavarotti) | composed by Franz Schubert | 3:32 |
| 3. | "E lucevan le stelle" (sung by José Carreras) | Act III of Tosca by Giacomo Puccini | 3:34 |

== Charts ==
=== Weekly charts ===
Weekly chart performance for The Three Tenors in Concert 1994
| Chart (1994–2007) | Peak position |
|---|---|
| Argentine Albums (CAPIF) | 10 |
| Australian Albums (ARIA) | 1 |
| Austrian Albums (Ö3 Austria) | 1 |
| Hungarian Albums (MAHASZ) | 3 |
| Italian Albums (Musica e Dischi) | 2 |
| New Zealand Albums (RMNZ) | 1 |
| Swedish Albums (Sverigetopplistan) | 1 |

| Chart (1994–95) | Peak position |
|---|---|
| Belgium (Flanders) | 34 |
| Belgium (Wallonia) | 36 |
| European | 1 |
| France | 47 |
| Germany | 2 |
| Netherlands | 2 |
| Norway | 19 |
| Spain | 1 |
| Switzerland | 3 |
| UK | 1 |
| US | 4 |
| US Classical Albums | 1 |

=== Year-end chart ===
| Chart (1994) | Peak position |
|---|---|
| US Classical Albums | 2 |

== Sales and certifications ==
| Region | Certification | Certified units/sales |
|---|---|---|
| Argentina (CAPIF) | Platinum | 60,000^{^} |
| Austria (IFPI Austria) | 2× Platinum | 100,000^{*} |
| Belgium (BRMA) | 2× Platinum | 100,000^{*} |
| Brazil | — | 200,000 |
| Canada (Music Canada) | 3× Platinum | 300,000^{^} |
| Germany (BVMI) | 3× Gold | 750,000^{^} |
| Finland (Musiikkituottajat) | Gold | 28,684 |
| France (SNEP) | Platinum | 300,000^{*} |
| Mexico | — | 100,000 |
| Netherlands (NVPI) | 4× Platinum | 100,000^{^} |
| New Zealand (RMNZ) | Platinum | 15,000^{^} |
| Spain (Promusicae) | 2× Platinum | 200,000^{^} |
| Sweden (GLF) | Gold | 50,000^{^} |
| Switzerland (IFPI Switzerland) | Platinum | 50,000^{^} |
| United Kingdom (BPI) video | 2× Platinum | 100,000^{^} |
| United Kingdom (BPI) | 2× Platinum | 600,000^{^} |
| United States (RIAA) video | 5× Platinum | 500,000^{^} |
| United States (RIAA) | Platinum | 1,000,000^{^} |
Summaries
| Europe (IFPI) | 3× Platinum | 3,000,000^{*} |
^{*} Sales figures based on certification alone.^{^} Shipments figures based on certification alone.

== Personnel ==
- José Carreras, vocals
- Plácido Domingo, vocals
- Luciano Pavarotti, vocals
- Zubin Mehta, conductor
- Los Angeles Philharmonic
- Los Angeles Opera Chorus
- Lalo Schifrin, arranger
- David Hewitt (Remote Recording's Silver Truck), sound recorder

== See also ==
- Carreras Domingo Pavarotti in Concert (the first Three Tenors concert recording)
- The Three Tenors: Paris 1998
