= Enrico Caruso compact disc discography =

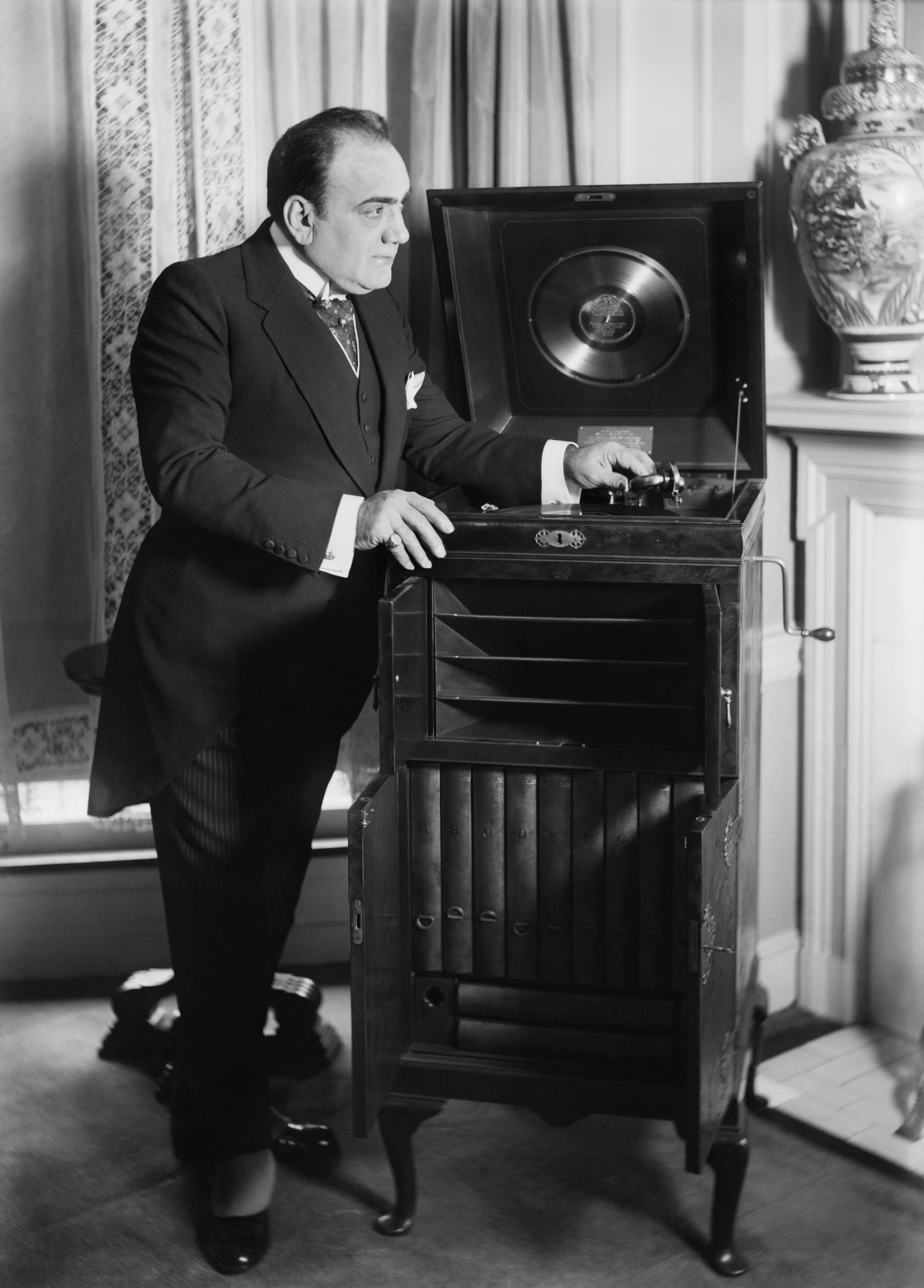
Enrico Caruso with a Victrola phonograph.

The following discography contains information regarding some of the published recordings by Enrico Caruso (25 February 1873 – 2 August 1921) made from 1902 through 1920 as have been made available in selected compact disc compilations.

== IV ==
The Caruso Edition Vol. IV was released in 1993 by Pearl Records.

=== Disc 2 ===
1. A la luz de la luna (Antón y Michelena)
2. Sei morta nella vita mia (Francesco Antonio Costa)
3. La partida (Fermín María Álvarez)
4. Ne gustare m'e dato; Sleale! Il segreto fu dunque violato (Giuseppe Verdi)
5. Over there – Par la bas (George M. Cohan, Louis Delamarre)
6. Pietà signore (Abraham Niedermeyer)
7. A Granada (Fermín María Álvarez)
8. Campane a sera "Ave Maria" (Vincenzo Billi)
9. Inno di Garibaldi (Luigi Mercantini, Alessio Olivieri)
10. La campane di San Giusto (Columbo Arona)
11. Le regiment de Sambre et Meuse (Paul Cezano, Robert Planquette)
12. Sultanto a te (Salvatore Fucito)
13. Je viens célebrer la victoire (Camille Saint-Saëns)
14. Venti scudi (Gaetano Donizetti)
15. A vucchella (Francesco Paolo Tosti)
16. Vieni sul mar (Traditional)
17. Tu ca nun chiagne (Ernesto de Curtis)
18. Addio a Napoli (Teodoro Cottrau)

=== Disc 3 ===
1. Tre giorni son che Nina
2. Premiere caresse (Vincenzo di Crescenzo)
3. Senza nisciuno (Ernesto de Curtis)
4. Mia piccirella (André da Silva Gomez)
5. Serenata (C.A Bracco)
6. Scordame (Salvatore Fucito)
7. Love me or not (Antonio Secchi)
8. Ombra mai fu (George Frideric Handel)
9. Noche feliz (Guillermo Posadas)
10. Rachel, quand du Seigneur (Jacques Halévy)
11. Je m'arricordo e Napule (Joseph Giuseppe Giòe)
12. Vaghissima sembianza (Stefano Donaudy)
13. Deh ch'io ritorni (Giacomo Meyerbeer)
14. Bois epais (Jean Baptiste Lully)
15. A dream (John Bartlett)
16. Domine deus (Gioachino Rossini)
17. Crucifixus (Gioachino Rossini)

== Caruso in Love ==
Caruso in Love was released in 1994 by RCA Records.

1. "Celeste Aida (Giuseppe Verdi)
2. "Your eyes have told me what I did not know" (Geoffrey O'Hara)
3. "M'apparì tutt'amor" (Friedrich von Flotow)
4. "Because" (Guy d'Hardelot)
5. "Che gelida manina" (Giacomo Puccini)
6. "O soave fanciulla" (Giacomo Puccini)
7. "Noche feliz" (Guillermo Posadas)
8. "Mia sposa sarà la mia bandiera" (Augusto Rotoli)
9. "Sento una forza indomita" (Antônio Carlos Gomes)
10. "For you alone" (Henry Ernest Geehl)
11. "Spirto gentil" (Gaetano Donizetti)
12. "Lasciati amar" (Ruggero Leoncavallo)
13. "Love is mine" (Clarence G. Gartner)
14. "Una furtiva lagrima" (Gaetano Donizetti)
15. "Il fior che avevi a me tu dato" (Georges Bizet)
16. "Parted" (Francesco Paolo Tosti)
17. "Première caresse" (Vincenzo de Crescenzo)
18. "E lucevan le stelle" (Giacomo Puccini)
19. "Love me or not" (Antonio Secchi)
20. "Eternamente" (Edoardo Mascheroni)
21. "Bella figlia dell'amore" (Giuseppe Verdi)

== Caruso in Song ==
Caruso in Song was released in 1992 by Nimbus Records (Prima Voce).

1. "Tarantella sincera" (Vincenzo di Crescenzo)
2. "For you alone" (Henry Ernest Geehl)
3. "La danza" (Gioachino Rossini)
4. "Hantise d'amour" (Josef Zygmunt Szulc)
5. "Cielo turchino" (M.S. Ciociano)
6. "Pecchè" (Gaetano Errico Pennino)
7. "Santa Lucia" (Teodoro Cottrau)
8. "'O sole mio" (Giovanni Capurro, Edwardo di Capua)
9. "La partida" (Fermín María Álvarez)
10. "Pietà signore" (Louis Niedermeyer)
11. "Campane a sera" (Vincenzo Billi)
12. "A Granada" (Fermín María Álvarez)
13. "Over there – Par la bas" (George M. Cohan, Louis Delamarre)
14. "Sultanto a te" (Salvatore Fucito)
15. "Vieni sul mar" (Traditional)
16. "Tre giorni son che Nina" (Vincenzo Legrenzio Ciampi)
17. "Ombra mai fu" (George Frideric Handel)
18. "Domine deus" (Gioachino Rossini)
19. "Because" (Guy d'Hardelot)

== Caruso in Song ==
Another album titled Caruso in Song was released in 1993 by RCA Records.

1. "L'alba separa dalla luce l'ombra" (Francesco Paolo Tosti)
2. "A Granada" (Fermín María Álvarez)
3. "Veni sul mar" (Traditional)
4. "Over there/Par là-bas" (George M. Cohan, Louis Delamarre)
5. "Chanson de juin" (Benjamin Godard)
6. "Amor mio" (Vincenzo Ricciardi)
7. "Pietà signore" (Abraham Niedermeyer)
8. "Tiempo antico" (Enrico Caruso Jr.)
9. "Hantise d'amour" (Josef Szulc)
10. "The lost chord" (Arthur Sullivan)
11. "La danza" (Gioachino Rossini)
12. "Core n'grato" (Manuel Cardoso)
13. "Luna d'estate" (Francesco Paolo Tosti)
14. "Don Juan's serenade" (P.I. Tchaikovsky)
15. "O sole mio" (Giovanni Capurro, Eddie di Capua)
16. "Guardanno 'a luna" (Vincenzo de Crescenzo)
17. "Dreams of long ago" (Enrico Caruso Jr.)
18. "Uocchie celeste" (Vincenzo de Crescenzo)
19. "Cielo turchino" (M.S. Ciociano)
20. "Campana di San Giusto" (Giovanni Drovetti, Columbo Arona)
21. "Mattinata" (Ruggero Leoncavallo)

== Caruso Sings Verdi ==
Caruso Sings Verdi was released in 1992 by RCA Records.

1. Questa o quella (Rigoletto)
2. Ella mi fu rapita (Rigoletto)
3. La donna è mobile (Rigoletto)
4. Bella figlia dell'amore (Rigoletto)
5. Amici miei soldati; La rivedrà nell'estasi (Un ballo in maschera)
6. Di tu se fedele (Un ballo in maschera)
7. Ora e per sempre addio (Otello)
8. Sì pel ciel marmoreo giuro (Otello)
9. Ingemisco tamquam reus (Requiem)
10. Libiamo, libiamo (La traviata)
11. Ah sì ben mio (Il trovatore)
12. Di quella pira (Il trovatore)
13. Se m'ami ancor; Ai nostri monti ritorneremo (with Ernestine Schumann-Heink)(Il trovatore)
14. Della natal sua terra il padre; O tu che in seno agli angeli (La forza del destino)
15. Solenne in quest'ora (with Antonio Scotti) (La forza del destino)
16. Qual voluttà trascorrere (I Lombardi alla prima crociata)
17. Ah la paterna mano (Macbeth)
18. Se quel guerrier io fossi … Celeste Aida (Aida)
19. La fatal pietra (Aida)
20. Dio, che nell'alma infondere (with Antonio Scotti) (Don Carlos)

== The Complete Caruso Vol. II ==
The Complete Caruso Vol. II was released in 2001 by RCA Records.

1. Agnus dei (Georges Bizet)
2. Donna non vidi mai (Giacomo Puccini)
3. Ave Maria (Percy Kahn)
4. Elégie (Jules Massenet)
5. Lasciati amar (Ruggero Leoncavallo)
6. Guardann'a luna (Vincenzo di Crescenzo)
7. Your eyes have told me what I did not know (Geoffrey O'Hara)
8. Fenesta che lucive (Vincenzo Bellini)
9. Cujus animam (Gioachino Rossini)
10. Les rameaux (Jean-Baptiste Faure)
11. Addio alla madre (Pietro Mascagni)
12. Sì pel ciel (Giuseppe Verdi)
13. Serenade de Don Juan (P.I. Tchaikovskii)

== Complete Recordings Vol. 5 ==
Complete Recordings Vol. 5 is part of the Naxos Records twelve-volume collection of recordings (1902–1920). It was edited in 2001 by Naxos Records.

1. Ora e per sempre addio (Giuseppe Verdi)
2. Mal reggendo all'aspro assalto (Giuseppe Verdi)
3. Ai nostri monti (Giuseppe Verdi)
4. Ah! tu dei vivere (Giuseppe Verdi)
5. Misero appien mi festi (Giuseppe Verdi)
6. O merveille (Charles Gounod)
7. Seigneur Dieu, que vois-je (Charles Gounod)
8. O nuit d'amour (Charles Gounod)
9. Que voulez-vous, messieurs? (Charles Gounod)
10. Studenti udite (Alberto Franchetti)
11. Non chiuder gli occhi vaghi (Alberto Franchetti)
12. Amore o grillo (Giacomo Puccini)
13. Non ve l'avevo detto (Giacomo Puccini)
14. Cielo e mar (Amilcare Ponchielli)
15. For you alone (Henry Ernest Geehl)
16. O Lola (Pietro Mascagni)
17. Addio (Francesco Paolo Tosti)
18. Prison scene (Charles Gounod)
19. No, Pagliaccio non son (Ruggero Leoncavallo)

== Complete Recordings Vol. 7 ==
Complete Recordings Vol. 7 (1912–1913) is part of the Naxos Records twelve-volume collection of recordings (1902–1920). Catalogue number: 8.110724

1. "Qual voluttà trascorrere" (Giuseppe Verdi)
2. "Bella figlia dell'amore" (Giuseppe Verdi)
3. "Parmi veder le lagrime" (Giuseppe Verdi)
4. "Dio, che nell'alma infondere" (Giuseppe Verdi)
5. "Ai nostri monti" (Giuseppe Verdi)
6. "Le crucifix" (Jean-Baptiste Faure)
7. "Chi mi frena in tal momento" (Gaetano Donizetti)
8. "Tarantella sincera" (Vincenzo di Crescenzo)
9. "La danza" (Gioachino Rossini)
10. "Dreams of long ago" (Enrico Caruso Jr)
11. "The lost chord" (Arthur Sullivan)
12. "Hossana" (Jules Granier)
13. "On l'appelle manon" (Jules Massenet)
14. "O soave fanciulla" (Giacomo Puccini)
15. "Donna non vidi mai" (Giacomo Puccini)
16. "Pimpinella" (Piotr Ilich Tchaikovskii)
17. "Agnus dei" (Georges Bizet)
18. "Ave Maria" (Percy Kahn)
19. "Elégie" (Jules Massenet)
20. "Because" (Guy d'Hardelot)

== Complete Recordings Vol. 9 ==
Complete Recordings Vol. 9 (1914–1916) is part of the Naxos Records twelve-volume collection of recordings (1902–1920). Catalogue number: 8.110750

1. Libiamo ne lieti calici (G. Verdi)
2. Sento una forza indomita (Antonio Carlos Gomez)
3. Hantise d'amour (J. Szulc)
4. Parle-moi de ma mere (G. Bizet)
5. La mia canzone (P. Tosti)
6. Pecche (G. Pennino)
7. Cielo turchino (C. Ciociano)
8. Ingemisco (G. Verdi)
9. Angelo (M. Salvi)
10. Si vous l'aviez compris (L. Denza)
11. Les deux serenades (R. Leoncavallo)
12. La procession (C. Frank)
13. O souverain, o juge, o pere (J. Massenet)
14. Luna d'estate (P. Tosti)
15. O sole mio (G. Capurro, E. di Capua)
16. Inspirez-moi, race divine (C. Gounod)
17. Mia sposa sara la mia bandiera (A. Rotoli)
18. Ah la paterna mano (G. Verdi)
19. Vecchia zimarra (G. Puccini)
20. Cantique de Noel (A. Adam)

== Complete Recordings Vol. 11 ==
Complete Recordings Vol. 11 was released by Naxos in 2004.

1. A la luz de la luna (Antonio y Michelena)
2. Sei morta nella vita (Pasquale Mario Costa)
3. La partida (Fermín María Álvarez)
4. Ne gustare m'e dato; Sleale! Il segreto fu dunque violato? (Giuseppe Verdi)
5. Over there – Par la bas (George M. Cohan, Louis Delamarre)
6. Pieta signore (Louis Niedermeyer)
7. A granada (Fermín María Álvarez)
8. Campane a sera "Ave Maria" (Vincenzo Billi)
9. Inno di Garibaldi (Dino Olivieri)
10. La campana di San Guisto (Columbino Arona)
11. Le regiment de Sambre et Meuse (Robert Planquette)
12. Sultanto a te (Salvatore Fucitto)
13. Je viens celebrer la victoire (Camille Saint-Saëns)
14. Venti scudi (Gaetano Donizetti)
15. A vucchella (Paolo Tosti)
16. Vieni sul mar (Traditional)
17. Tu ca nun chiagne (Ernesto di Curtis)
18. Addio a Napoli (Teodoro Cottrau)

== Complete Recordings Vol. 12 ==
Complete Recordings Vol. 12 (1902–1920) is part of the Naxos Records twelve-volume collection of recordings (1902–1920). Catalogue number: 8.110753

1. Nina
2. Premiere caresse
3. Senza nisciuno
4. Mia piccirella
5. Serenata
6. Scordame
7. Love me or not
8. Xerxes
9. Noche feliz
10. Rachel, quand du seigneur
11. I'm' arricordo e Napule
12. Vaghissima sembianza
13. Deh ch'io ritorni
14. Bois epais
15. A dream
16. Domine deus
17. Crucifixus
18. Liberty forever (played by the Victor Military Band)
19. My cousin Caruso (sung by Billy May)
20. Studenti udite

== French Repertoire Part I ==
French Repertoire Part I was released in 2000 by Vocal Archives.

Track listing:

1. Je viens célébrer la victoire (Camille Saint-Saëns)
2. Vois ma misère (Camille Saint-Saëns)
3. Del tempio a limitar (Georges Bizet)
4. Mi par d'udir ancora (Georges Bizet)
5. Je crois entendre encore (Georges Bizet)
6. De mon amie (Georges Bizet)
7. Parle-moi de ma mère (Georges Bizet)
8. Il fior che avevi a me tu dato (Georges Bizet)
9. Le fleur que tu m'avais jetée (Georges Bizet)
10. Agnus dei (Georges Bizet)
11. On l'appelle Manon (Jules Massenet)
12. Chiudo gli occhi (Jules Massenet)
13. Chiudo gli occhi (Jules Massenet)
14. Ah fuyez douce image (Jules Massenet)
15. O souverain, o juge, o père (Jules Massenet)
16. Élégie (Jules Massenet)
17. Chanson de Juin (Benjamin Godard)

== The Great Caruso ==
The Great Caruso was released in 1997 by Living Era. Most of the songs are from well-known operas.

1. Vesti la giubba (R. Leoncavallo)
2. Una furtiva lagrima (G. Donizetti)
3. Chiudo gli occhi (J. Massenet)
4. Cielo e mar (A. Ponchielli)
5. M'appari tutt'amor (F. Von Flotow)
6. Solenne in quest'ora (G. Verdi) (with Antonio Scotti)
7. Che gelida manina (G. Puccini)
8. O soave fanciulla (G. Puccini) (with Nellie Melba)
9. Del tempio al limitar (G. Bizet) (with Mario Ancona)
10. Celeste Aida (G. Verdi)
11. Se m'ami ancor... Ai nostri monti ritorneremo (G. Verdi) (with Ernestine Schumann-Heink)
12. Recondita armonia (G. Puccini)
13. La fleur que tu m'avais jetee (G. Bizet)
14. Mamma! Quel vino e generoso! (P. Mascagni)
15. Si pel ciel (G. Verdi) (with Titta Ruffo)
16. Libiamo ne lieti calici (G. Verdi) (with Alma Gluck)
17. Ah la paterna mano (G. Verdi)
18. Mia piccirella (Antônio Carlos Gomes)
19. Pimpinella (P.I. Tchaikovsky)
20. For you alone (H.E. Geehl)
21. Trusting eyes (C. Gartner)
22. Luna d'estate (P. Tosti)
23. O sole mio (G. Capurro, E. di Capua)

== Historical Recordings 1906–1914 ==
Historical Recordings 1906–1914 is an album edited in 1989, by the record label Gala.

1. Che gelida manina (La bohème (Puccini))
2. O soave fanciulla (La bohème (Puccini))
3. O Mimì tu più non torni (La bohème (Puccini))
4. Recondita armonia (Tosca (Puccini))
5. E lucevan le stelle Tosca (Puccini))
6. Vesti la giubba (I pagliacci (Leoncavallo))
7. No, pagliaccio non son (I pagliacci (Leoncavallo))
8. Testa adorata (La bohème (Leoncavallo))
9. Questa o quella (from Rigoletto)
10. La donna è mobile (from Rigoletto)
11. Ah si ben mio coll'essere (from Il trovatore)
12. Di quella pira (from Il Trovatore)
13. Quel suon... Ah! che la morte (Miserere) (from Il trovatore)
14. Se m'ami ancor... Ai nostri monti (from Il trovatore)
15. Libiamo, ne' lieti calici (Brindisi) (from La traviata)
16. Di' tu sei fedele (from Un ballo in maschera)
17. Della natal sua terra il padre... O tu che in seno agl'angeli (from La forza del destino)
18. Celeste Aida (from Aida)
19. Nell'ore arcante della sua lussaria... Ora e per sempre addio (from Otello)
20. Oh! mostruosa colpa!... Si, pel ciel' (from Otello)
21. Cielo e mar (from La Gioconda)
22. Un dì all'azzurro spazio (from Andrea Chénier)
23. O Lola (Siciliana) (from Cavalleria rusticana)
24. Oh, con che calma eterna (from Giovanni Gallurese)

== Tenor of the Century ==
Tenor of the Century was released in 2000 by Living Era.

=== Disc 1 ===
1. Vesti la giubba
2. Una furtiva lagrima
3. Chiudo gli occhi
4. Cielo e mar
5. M'apparì tutt'amor
6. Solenne in quest'ora (with Antonio Scotti)
7. Che gelida manina
8. O soave fanciulla (with Nellie Melba)
9. Del tempio al limitar (with Mario Ancona)
10. Celeste Aida
11. Se m'ami ancor...Ai nostri monti ritorneremo (with Ernestine Schumann-Heink)
12. Recondita armonia
13. La fleur que tu m'avais jetée
14. Mamma! Quel vino è generoso
15. Oh! Monstruosa colpa! Sì, pel ciel (with Titta Ruffo)
16. Libiamo ne lieti calici (with Alma Gluck)
17. Ah la paterna mano
18. Mia piccirella
19. Pimpinella
20. For you alone
21. Trusting eyes
22. Luna d'estate
23. O sole mio

=== Disc 2 ===
1. "Mi par d'udir ancora"
2. "Salut, demeure chaste et pure" (Faust, Gounod)
3. "La donna è mobile" (Rigoletto, Verdi)
4. "Mal reggendo all'aspro assalto" (Il trovatore, Verdi)
5. "O gioia della mia dimora!.. Testa adorata" (La bohème, Leoncavallo)
6. "Solo, profugo, reietto" (Marta)
7. "Donna non vidi mai" (La fanciulla del west, Puccini)
8. "Sento una forza indomita" with Emmy Destinn (Il Guarany, Antônio Carlos Gomes)
9. "Come un bel dì di maggio" (Andrea Chénier, Giordano)
10. "Venti scudi" with Giuseppe De Luca (L'elisir d'amore, Donizetti)
11. "Fronde tenere e belle ... Ombra mai fu" (Serse, Handel)
12. "Rachel, quand du signeur la grave tutélaire" (La Juive, Halévy)
13. "Pour un baiser"
14. "Canta pe'me"
15. "La danza"
16. "Guardann'a luna"
17. "Amor mio"
18. "Hantise d'amour"
19. "A vucchella"
20. "Addio a Napoli"
21. "Serenata"

== Verdi Recordings Volume 2 ==
'Released in 2005 by Vocal Archives.

1. "Quel suon, quelle preci"
2. "Se m'ami ancor... Ai nostri monti ritorneremo"
3. "Se m'ami ancor"
4. "Libiamo ne lieti calici"
5. "Amici miei soldati"
6. "Di tu sei fidele"
7. "Cosi scritto e lassù"
8. "Forse la soglia attinse"
9. "Della natal sua terra"
10. "Solenne in quest'ora"
11. "Il secreto fu dunque violato"
12. "Invano Alvaro"
13. "Domanda al ciel"
