= Ay Ay Ay (song) =

1913 composition by Osmán Pérez Freire

Osmán Pérez Freire

"¡Ay, ay, ay!", subtitled "Reminiscencias cuyanas", is a song composed in 1913 by the Chilean-born composer, pianist, singer and publisher Osmán Pérez Freire. Freire (born in Santiago in 1880), who emigrated to Mendoza, Argentina in c.1886-1890, was a figure of some note in the evolution of Tango. This song, however, known worldwide, is his most famous composition, and has never fallen out of fashion. It is equally suited to intimate performance with guitar or piano accompaniment, or to large-scale concert delivery with orchestral accompaniment, and has been sung by almost everyone, and especially favoured by some of the most famous tenors, since it was first written (see below).

"Ay, ay, ay" is a Hispanic expression signifying dismay at a bad situation or state of affairs, rather more immediate and acute than the English "alas". Purely instrumental versions include arrangements for dance orchestras, jazz combinations and salon musicians. The autograph manuscript of the song is at PAU. This song should not be confused with the Mexican Cielito Lindo, the chorus of which begins, "Ay, ay, ay, ay".

In what may be the earliest publication (by Breyer Hermanos, 414 Florida), the song is subtitled "Reminiscencias Cuyanas". Although often mistakenly called a "Chilean" song, perhaps because of the place of birth of the composer, the style is in fact that of a traditional canción cuyana of the Cuyo region of north-west Argentina. In publication it acquired subtitles as "Canción Criolla" or "Argentine Song", and (in Schott's edition) "Kreolisches Wiegenlied" or "Argentine Lullaby". The spelling Ay-Ay-Ay, though incorrect, occurs commonly in English sources.

== Lyrics ==
Si alguna vez en tu pecho,

¡ay ay ay!

mi cariño no lo abrigas,
engáñalo como un niño,

¡ay ay ay!

pero nunca se lo digas...

== Recordings (examples) ==
- Enrico Caruso for HMV
- Miguel Fleta for HMV (1930)
- José Mardones for Columbia-Rena (1920)
- Tito Schipa for HMV (1922 and 1926)
- Umberto Urbano
- Conchita Supervia for Parlophone
- Dmitri Smirnoff for Parlophone (1929)
- Richard Tauber for Odeon Records
- Jussi Björling
- Giuseppe di Stefano (1952)
- Mario Lanza
- Alfredo Kraus
- The Three Tenors
- Julio Iglesias
- In 1956, Les Baxter, included a version on his "Caribbean Moonlight" LP.
