= Carreras Domingo Pavarotti in Concert =

- (left to right) Domingo, Carreras, Mehta, and Pavarotti

Live album by The Three Tenors
- Released: 1990
- Recorded: 7 July 1990, Rome, Italy
- Genre: Opera
- Length: 67:55
- Label: Decca / London
- Producer: Christopher Raeburn

The Three Tenors chronology
Carreras Domingo Pavarotti in Concert	The Three Tenors in Concert 1994

Carreras Domingo Pavarotti in Concert (re-released as The Three Tenors in Concert) is a live album by José Carreras, Plácido Domingo and Luciano Pavarotti with conductor Zubin Mehta. The album was recorded on 7 July 1990 in Rome, Italy, as the first Three Tenors concert with the orchestra of the Maggio Musicale Fiorentino and the orchestra of Teatro dell'Opera di Roma on the evening before the 1990 FIFA World Cup Final. It was produced by Gian Carlo Bertelli and Herbert Chappell.

== Track listing ==
The concert is particularly known for the two recordings of "Nessun dorma". The first is sung by Pavarotti alone. The second, the concert encore, includes all three tenors singing individually and then, for the final 'Vincerò!' singing together.

No.	Title	Song information	Length
1.	"È la solita storia (Lamento Di Federico)" (sung by José Carreras)	Act II of L'arlesiana by Francesco Cilea	4:21
2.	"O paradis" (sung by Plácido Domingo)	Act IV of L'Africaine by Giacomo Meyerbeer	3:12
3.	"Recondita armonia" (sung by Luciano Pavarotti)	Act I of Tosca by Giacomo Puccini	2:37
4.	"Dein ist mein ganzes Herz" (sung by Plácido Domingo)	from Das Land des Lächelns by Franz Lehár	3:36
5.	"Rondine al nido" (sung by Luciano Pavarotti)	written by Vincenzo De Crescenzo	3:35
6.	"Core 'ngrato (Catari)" (sung by José Carreras)	written by Salvatore Cardillo	3:28
7.	"Torna a Surriento" (sung by Luciano Pavarotti)	written by Ernesto de Curtis	2:52
8.	"Granada" (sung by José Carreras)	written by Agustín Lara	3:41
9.	"No puede ser" (sung by Plácido Domingo)	from La tabernera del puerto by Pablo Sorozábal	2:43
10.	"Improvviso" (sung by José Carreras)	Act I of Andrea Chénier by Umberto Giordano	5:11
11.	"E lucevan le stelle" (sung by Plácido Domingo)	Act III of Tosca by Giacomo Puccini	2:40
12.	"Nessun dorma" (sung by Luciano Pavarotti)	Act III of Turandot by Giacomo Puccini	3:05
13.	"Maria / Tonight / 'O Paese d' 'o sole / Cielito lindo" (sung by The Three Tenors)	arranged by Lalo Schifrin	5:31
14.	"Memory / Ochi tchorniye / Caminito / La Vie en rose" (sung by The Three Tenors)	arranged by Lalo Schifrin	6:54
15.	"Mattinata / Wien, Wien, nur du allein / Amapola / 'O sole mio" (sung by The Three Tenors)	arranged by Lalo Schifrin	8:06
16.	"'O sole mio" (sung by The Three Tenors)	written by Eduardo di Capua	2:53
17.	"Nessun dorma" (sung by The Three Tenors)	Act III of Turandot by Giacomo Puccini	3:30

Notes

- Tracks 4–6 were a tribute to Giuseppe di Stefano, who had performed all three songs on record and on stage.
- Tracks 7–9 were a tribute to each singer's cultural heritage.
- Tracks 13–15 are part of a song medley. Tracks 16 and 17 are encores.

== Personnel ==
- José Carreras – vocals
- Plácido Domingo – vocals
- Luciano Pavarotti – vocals
- Zubin Mehta – conductor
- Maggio Musicale Fiorentino – orchestra
- Teatro dell'Opera di Roma – orchestra
- Lalo Schifrin – arranger

== Reception ==
The recording, released on the Decca Classics label, won the Grammy Award for Best Classical Vocal Performance in 1991 at the 33rd Grammy Awards. It is the best-selling classical album of all time and led to a shift in the way the music industry marketed classical recordings.

== Impact ==
This first Three Tenors performance and recording led to thirty-three additional concerts with Carreras, Domingo and Pavarotti, as well as three more live audio and video albums. All were best-sellers.

The unexpected success of the album among general audiences led to a restructuring of the classical music industry into separate "core classical" and "strategic classical" areas. With the latter category, the industry now geared its focus toward reaching new audiences via intense performer-centric marketing strategies.

== Charts ==
=== Weekly charts ===
Chart (1990)	Peak position
Australian Albums (ARIA)	1
Austrian Albums (Ö3 Austria)	2
Dutch Albums (Album Top 100)	1
European Albums	1
Finnish Albums (Suomen virallinen lista)	31
German Albums (Offizielle Top 100)	3
Hungarian Albums (MAHASZ)	19
Italian Albums (Musica e Dischi)	1
New Zealand Albums (RMNZ)	1
Norwegian Albums (VG-lista)	9
Spanish Albums (AFYVE)	1
Swedish Albums (Sverigetopplistan)	7
Swiss Albums (Schweizer Hitparade)	10
UK Albums (Official Charts)	1
US Billboard 200	35

=== Re-releases ===
Chart (1994 re-release)	Peak position	Weeks on chart
UK	11	12

Chart (25th anniversary re-release)	Peak position	Weeks on chart
Norway	21	1
Italy	49	4
Spain	85	1
Mexico	86	1

=== Year-end chart ===
Chart (1994 re-release)	Peak position
US Classical Albums	3

== Sales and certifications ==
Certifications for Carreras Domingo Pavarotti in Concert
Region	Certification	Certified units/sales
Argentina (CAPIF)	Platinum	60,000^{^}
Australia (ARIA)	6× Platinum	420,000^{^}
Austria (IFPI Austria)	2× Platinum	100,000^{*}
Brazil (Pro-Música Brasil)	2× Platinum	500,000^{*}
Canada (Music Canada)	Gold	50,000^{^}
Canada (Music Canada) video	4× Platinum	40,000^{^}
France (SNEP) video	Platinum	20,000^{*}
France (SNEP)	Platinum	300,000^{*}
Germany (BVMI) video	Platinum	50,000^{^}
Germany (BVMI)	Platinum	500,000^{^}
Italy	—	130,000
Netherlands (NVPI)	9× Platinum	225,000^{^}
New Zealand (RMNZ)	Platinum	15,000^{^}
Norway (IFPI Norway)	Platinum	50,000^{*}
Mexico (AMPROFON)	Gold	100,000^{^}
Poland (ZPAV)	2× Platinum	200,000^{*}
Spain (Promusicae)	14× Platinum	1,400,000^{^}
Sweden (GLF)	Platinum	100,000^{^}
Switzerland (IFPI Switzerland)	Gold	25,000^{^}
United Kingdom (BPI) video	Platinum	50,000^{^}
United Kingdom (BPI)	5× Platinum	1,500,000^{^}
United States (RIAA) video	5× Platinum	500,000^{^}
United States (RIAA)	3× Platinum	3,000,000^{^}
Summaries
Worldwide	—	10,000,000
^{*} Sales figures based on certification alone.^{^} Shipments figures based on certification alone.

== See also ==
- The Three Tenors in Concert 1994
- The Three Tenors: Paris 1998
- List of best-selling albums in Brazil
- List of best-selling albums in Spain
