= Vincenzo Legrenzo Ciampi =

Italian composer (1719–1762)

Vincenzo Legrenzo Ciampi (2 April 1719 – 30 March 1762) was an Italian composer. He is best known today as the composer of a song that cannot be certainly ascribed to his pen, "Tre giorni son che Nina in letto senesta", formerly long attributed to Pergolesi and better known simply as "Nina".

== Education and early career in Italy ==
Ciampi was born in Piacenza and studied at the Naples Conservatorio della Pietà dei Turchini with Francesco Durante and Leonardo Leo. His first known success was the comic opera Da un disordine nasce un ordine, performed at the Teatro dei Fiorentini in Naples in 1737, when he was only eighteen. Five more of his comic operas were produced in Naples up to 1745, and he also received commissions for operas to be presented in Rome and other Italian cities. In 1746, he was engaged as a harpsichordist at the opera house in Palermo, and his opera seria Ataserse was performed there in 1747. That same year, he was engaged at the Ospedale degli Incurabili in Venice as an assistant to the maestro di coro G. B. Runcher, whom he had succeeded by 1748.

== London ==
Ciampi was one of the first music directors of the Ospedale to be given extended leave, and by the autumn of 1748, he was in London. His replacement at the Ospedale was Gioacchino Cocchi. In London, Ciampi was the composer and director of music for a company of Italian singers under G. F. Crosa, who presented the first season of Italian comic opera at the King's Theatre, London. The company's repertoire consisted of works already presented in Venice, among which was Gli tre cicisbei ridicoli in which appeared the popular song "Tre giorni son che Nina", often attributed to Pergolesi. This caused Barclay Squire and others to suggest the song was actually composed by Ciampi; however, according to Frank Walker, "this is extremely doubtful". Ciampi continued to appear in London until 1756.

He died in Venice.

== Bibliography ==
- Fétis, François-Joseph (1860). "CIAMPI (Ligrenzio Vincenzo)", vol. 1, p. 299, in Biographie universelle des musiciens et bibliographie générale de la musique. Paris: Didot.
- Fétis, François-Joseph; Pougin, Arthur (1878). "CIAMPI (Legrenzo Vincenzo)", vol. 1, p. 183, in Biographie universelle des musiciens et bibliographie générale de la musique. Supplément et complément. Paris: Didot.
- Letellier, Robert Ignatius (2010). Opéra-Comique: A Sourcebook. - Page 241 1443821683 2010 Vincenzo. CIAMPI. (1719-1762). Le Caprice amoureux, ou Ninette à la cour Comédie mêlée d'ariettes parodiées de Bertolde à la cour en deux actes. Librettist: Charles-Simon Favart. Music parodied from Vincenzo Ciampi and various other ...
- Libby, Dennis; Willaert, Saskia; Jackman, James L. [work-list] (2001). "Ciampi, Vincenzo (Legrenzio)" in The New Grove Dictionary of Music and Musicians, 2nd edition, edited by Stanley Sadie. London: Macmillan. ISBN 9781561592395. (hardcover). OCLC 419285866 (eBook).
- Marshall, Robert Lewis (2003). Eighteenth-Century Keyboard Music. New York: Routledge. ISBN 9780415966429.
- Osborne, Charles (2014). The Concert Song Companion: A Guide to the Classical Repertoire. Springer. ISBN 9781475700497.
- Sonneck, Oscar G. (1911). "Ciampi’s Bertoldo, Bertoldino e Cacasenno and Favart’s Ninette à la cour: A Contribution to the History of Pasticcio (Sämmelbände der I. M. G., 1911)", pp. 111–179, in Miscellaneous Studies in the History of Music, edited by O. G. Sonneck. New York: Macmillan, 1921.
- Squire, W. Barclay (1899). "'Tre Giorni son che Nina'", The Musical Times, vol. 40, no. 674 (1 April 1899), pp. 243. At Hathitrust.
- Squire, W. Barclay (1914). "'Tre Giorni son che Nina'", The Musical Times, vol. 55, no. 860 (1 October 1914), p. 615. JSTOR 911035.
- Van Boer, Bertil H. (2012). Historical Dictionary of Music of the Classical Period. Scarecrow Press. ISBN 9780810871830.
- Walker, Frank (1948). "'Tre giorni son che Nina': An Old Controversy Reopened", The Musical Times, vol. 90, pp. 432–435. JSTOR 935254.
- Walker, Frank (1954). "CIAMPI, Vincenzo Legrenzio", vol. 2, pp. 293–294, in Grove's Dictionary of Music and Musicians. New York, St. Martin's Press. OCLC 13586086.
