= Amor, vida de mi vida =

Amor, vida de mi vida (Love, life of my life) is an aria for baritone from the zarzuela Maravilla composed by Federico Moreno Torroba to a libretto by Antonio Quintero and Jesús María de Arozamena. It premiered in Madrid in 1941, where the aria was sung by the baritone, Luis Sagi-Vela. It is a standard in Spanish concert lyrics, and was included in the repertoire of The Three Tenors (sung by Plácido Domingo).

The aria expresses the heartache of Rafael, a talented but unlucky singer, in love with Elvira. However, Elvira is in a relationship with Faustino, who is the theatrical producer of her mother, Maravilla, an opera diva who will be Rafael's partner in her next performance.
