= Percy Kahn =

English composer and pianist

Percival (Percy) Benedict Kahn (9 December 1880 – 2 May 1966) was an English composer and pianist. His most noted composition was the song Ave Maria with accompaniment by piano, and violin obbligato.

Kahn was born in London in 1880. He was a boy soprano, and at the age of 15 won a scholarship to the Royal College of Music, where he studied for four years under the organist and composer Walter Parratt. He also studied piano with Marmaduke Barton, and theory with Charles Wood and Walford Davies.

Kahn accompanied some of the great musicians of the day, including violinists Mischa Elman and Fritz Kreisler; sopranos Dame Nellie Melba, Luisa Tetrazzini, Florence Austral and Oda Slobodskaya, tenors Enrico Caruso, John McCormack, Richard Tauber, Vladimir Rosing, Joseph Hislop and Beniamino Gigli; and baritones Titta Ruffo and John Brownlee. Of all these artists, he was most closely associated with Richard Tauber, whom he accompanied regularly for 14 years, from 1933 up until Tauber's death.

Tauber recorded four of his songs for Parlophone, and sang others in broadcasts.

His Ave Maria was recorded in 1913 by Enrico Caruso and Mischa Elman, with the composer at the piano.

Percy Kahn was married to the contralto Olive Kavann, with whom he also recorded. He died in Margate, Kent in 1966.
