= Umberto Urbano =

Italian opera singer

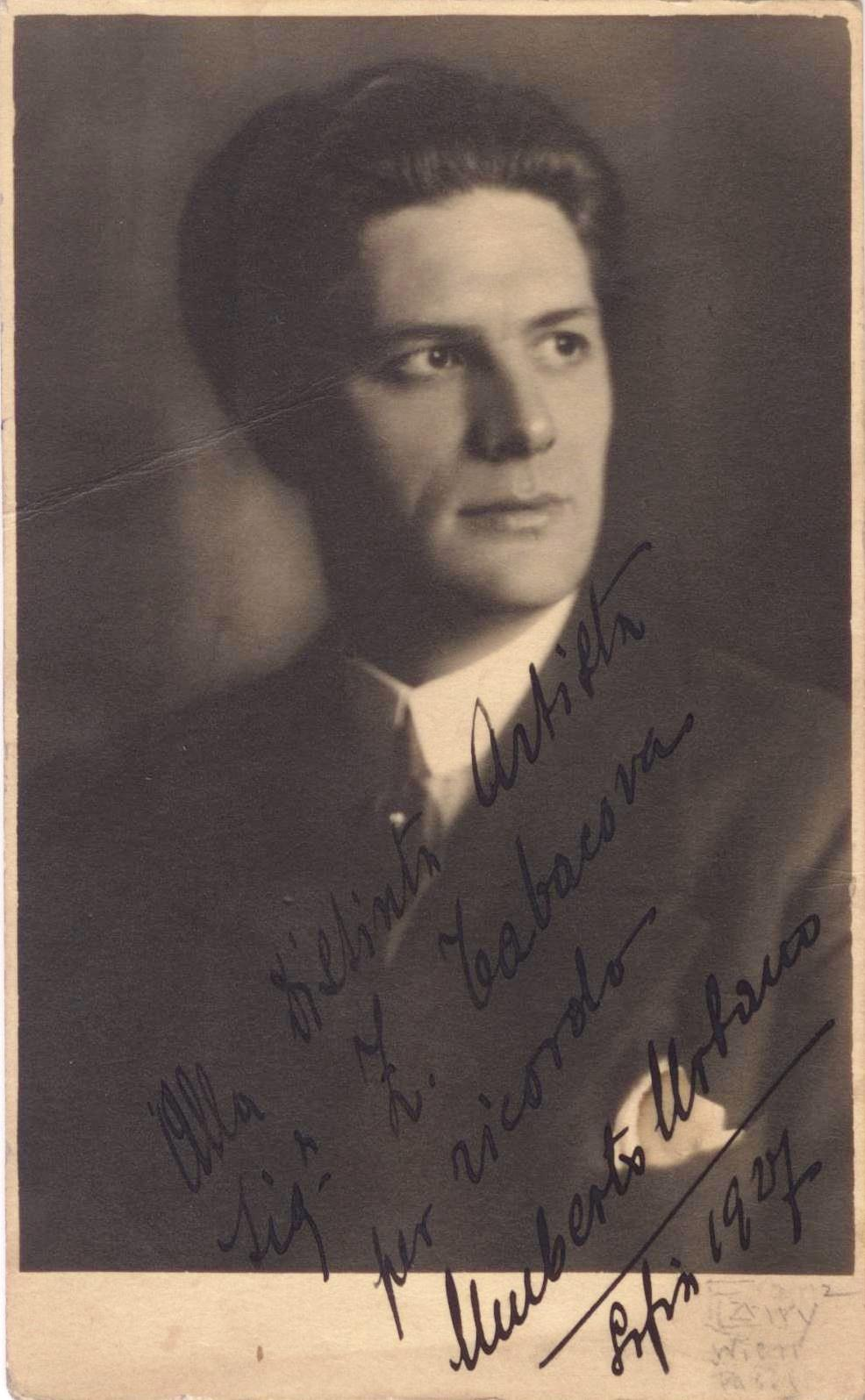
Umberto Urbano, 1927. Source: Bulgarian Archives State Agency

Umberto Urbano (16 October 1885 in Livorno – 16 June 1969), was an Italian baritone opera singer. He made his debut in 1907 in Trieste. His career really picked up momentum in 1920, beginning as the Herald in Lohengrin at La Scala. He also appeared there in 1923 as Telramund in Lohengrin and Enrico in Lucia di Lammermoor. In 1924 he appeared at the Royal Albert Hall in a Special Sunday Concert.
