= Tre giorni son che Nina =

Aria

"Tre giorni son che Nina in letto senesta" (often called "Nina" or the "Siciliana") is an 18th-century song long attributed to Pergolesi, but now more often to Vincenzo Legrenzo Ciampi (1719–1762). The song was one of the "Arie antiche" favourites of 19th-century salons associated with Alessandro Parisotti, and in the 20th century was recorded by Enrico Caruso, Tito Schipa, Giuseppe Anselmi, Richard Tucker as well as more recently, by Alfredo Kraus and Ramon Vargas. The attribution to Pergolesi may have come from the mistaken assumption that the song is based on an aria sung about Nina in Pergolesi's Lo frate 'nnamorato.
