= Osmán Pérez Freire =

Chilean composer (1878–1930)

Osmán Pérez Freire

Osmán Pérez Freire (Santiago, 29 January 1880 – Madrid, 2 April 1930) was a Chilean composer. Born in Santiago, a grandson of Ramón Freire, his family moved to Mendoza, in the desert Cuyo region of western Argentina, in 1886. Freire moved to Spain in the 1920s. His daughters are Mercedes Pérez Freire and Liliana "Lily" Pérez Freire.

== Works, editions and recordings ==
- "Ay-Ay-Ay" song on Ay-Ay-Ay recital Luigi Alva Decca 1963

== Links ==
- Free scores by Osmán Pérez Freire at the International Music Score Library Project (IMSLP)
