= Nessun dorma =

Aria from Puccini's Turandot

Nessun Dorma
- Aria by Puccini
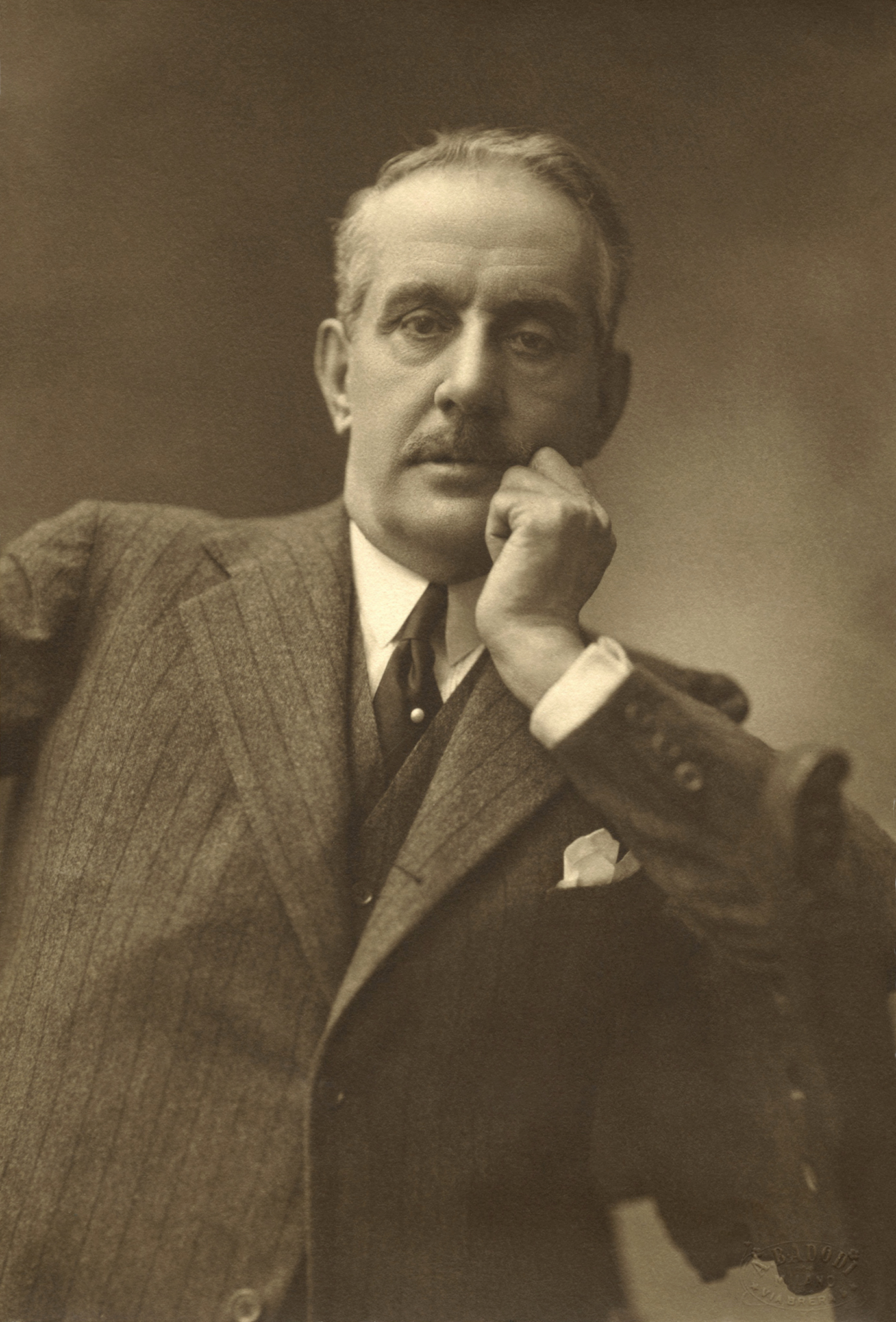
- Puccini, 1924
- Key: G Major
- Period: Romantic
- Genre: Opera
- Language: Italian
- Duration: 3–4 minutes
- Vocal: Tenor

"Nessun dorma" (Italian: [nesˌsun ˈdɔrma]; lit. 'Let no one sleep') is an aria from the final act of Italian composer Giacomo Puccini's opera Turandot (text by Giuseppe Adami and Renato Simoni) and one of the best-known tenor arias in all opera. It is sung by Calaf, il principe ignoto (the unknown prince), who falls in love at first sight with the beautiful but cold Princess Turandot. Any man who wishes to wed Turandot must first answer her three riddles; if he fails, he will be beheaded. In the aria, Calaf expresses his triumphant assurance that he will win the princess.

Although "Nessun dorma" had long been a staple of operatic recitals, Luciano Pavarotti popularised the piece beyond the opera world in the 1990s following his performance of it for the 1990 FIFA World Cup. Both Pavarotti and Plácido Domingo released singles of the aria; Pavarotti's reached number 2 in the UK, and it appeared on the best-selling classical album of all time, The Three Tenors in Concert. The Three Tenors, which includes José Carreras, performed the aria at three subsequent FIFA World Cup Finals, in 1994 in Los Angeles, 1998 in Paris, and 2002 in Yokohama. Since 1990, many crossover artists have performed and recorded it. The aria has been sung often in films and on television.

== Context and analysis ==
In the act before this aria, Calaf has correctly answered the three riddles put to all of Princess Turandot's prospective suitors. Nonetheless, she recoils at the thought of marriage to him. Calaf offers her another chance by challenging her to guess his name by dawn. As he kneels before her, the "Nessun dorma" theme makes a first appearance, to his words, "Il mio nome non sai!" (My name you do not know!). She can execute him if she correctly guesses his name; but if she does not, she must marry him. The cruel and emotionally cold princess then decrees that none of her subjects shall sleep that night until his name is discovered. If they fail, all will be killed.

As the final act opens, it is now night. Calaf is alone in the moonlit palace gardens. In the distance, he hears Turandot's heralds proclaiming her command. His aria begins with an echo of their cry and a reflection on Princess Turandot:

"Nessun dorma"
Synthesised instrumental version

Nessun dorma! Nessun dorma
Tu pure, o Principessa,
nella tua fredda stanza,
guardi le stelle
che tremano d'amore, e di speranza!

None shall sleep! None shall sleep!
Not even you, oh Princess,
in your cold bedroom,
watching the stars
that tremble with love, and with hope!

Ma il mio mistero è chiuso in me;
il nome mio nessun saprà!
No, No! Sulla tua bocca,
lo dirò quando la luce splenderà!

But my secret is hidden within me;
no one will know my name!
No, no! On your mouth,
I will say it when the light shines!

Ed il mio bacio scioglierà
il silenzio che ti fa mia!

And my kiss will dissolve
the silence that makes you mine!

Just before the climactic end of the aria, a chorus of women is heard singing in the distance:

Il nome suo nessun saprà,
E noi dovrem, ahimè, morir, morir!

No one will know his name,
and we will have to, alas, die, die!

Calaf, now certain of victory, sings:

Dilegua, o notte!
Tramontate, stelle!
Tramontate, stelle!
All'alba, vincerò!
Vincerò! Vincerò!

Vanish, o night!
Fade, you stars!
Fade, you stars!
At dawn, I will win!
I will win! I will win!

In typical performance style, the final "Vincerò!" features a sustained B_{4}, followed by the final note, an A_{4} sustained even longer—although Puccini's score did not explicitly specify that either note be sustained. In the original score, the B is written as a sixteenth note (semiquaver) while the A is written as a whole note (semibreve). Both are high notes in the tenor range.

In Alfano's completion of act 3, the "Nessun dorma" theme makes a final triumphal appearance at the end of the opera. The theme also makes a concluding reappearance in Luciano Berio's later completion (this having been an expressed intention of Puccini), but in a more subdued orchestration.

== Recordings ==
"Nessun dorma", sung by some of the most famous interpreters of Calaf, appears on the following compilation recordings (for full-length recordings of the opera, see Turandot discography):

- Harry Secombe sings it in Davy
- The Very Best of Beniamino Gigli (EMI Classics)
- The Very Best of Jussi Björling (EMI Classics)
- Richard Tucker in Recital (Columbia Masterworks/Myto)
- The Very Best of Franco Corelli (EMI Classics)
- Pavarotti Forever (Decca)
- The Essential Plácido Domingo (Deutsche Grammophon)

== Cultural references and adaptations ==
=== Luciano Pavarotti ===
"Nessun dorma" achieved pop status after Luciano Pavarotti's 1972 recording of it was used as the theme song of BBC television's coverage of the 1990 FIFA World Cup in Italy. It subsequently reached no. 2 on the UK Singles Chart. Although Pavarotti sang the role of Calaf on stage only twice (first in 1977 at the San Francisco Opera under Riccardo Chailly with Montserrat Caballe as Turandot, and then twenty years later at the Met under James Levine opposite Jane Eaglen as Turandot,) "Nessun dorma" became his signature aria and a sporting anthem in its own right, especially for football. Pavarotti notably sang the aria during the first Three Tenors concert on the eve of the 1990 FIFA World Cup Final in Rome. For an encore, he performed the aria again, taking turns with José Carreras and Plácido Domingo. The image of three tenors in full formal dress singing in a World Cup concert captivated the global audience. The album of the concert achieved triple platinum record status in the United States alone and went on to outsell all other classical recordings worldwide. The number became a regular feature of subsequent Three Tenors concerts, and they performed it at three subsequent FIFA World Cup Finals, in 1994 in Los Angeles, 1998 in Paris, and 2002 in Yokohama.

Pavarotti gave a rendition of "Nessun dorma" at his final performance, the finale of the 2006 Winter Olympics opening ceremony, although it was later revealed that he had lip-synched the specially pre-recorded performance as it was too cold for him to sing live. His Decca recording of the aria was played at his funeral during the flypast by the Italian Air Force. In 2013, the track was certified gold by the Federation of the Italian Music Industry. The track was remixed in 2024 by Timmy Trumpet and Steve Aoki.

=== Crossover and adapted versions ===
"Nessun dorma" (often in adapted versions of the score) has been performed by many pop and crossover singers and instrumentalists.

- The 1989 song "A Love So Beautiful", co-written by Roy Orbison and Jeff Lynne, borrows the aria's melody.
- In what the National Academy of Recording Arts and Sciences called "the greatest last-second substitution act in Grammy history", Aretha Franklin sang a "soul-infused" version of the aria in place of Luciano Pavarotti when throat problems caused him to withdraw from the 1998 Grammy Awards show.
- The 2002 album Warriors of the World by the band Manowar features a version of the aria.
- In 2007, Chris Botti recorded a trumpet version of the aria for his album Italia.
- Anohni, lead singer of Anohni and the Johnsons, recorded the aria with the Orchestra Roma Sinfonietta as part of an advertising campaign for the Italian coffee company Lavazza in 2009.
- Jeff Beck's 2010 album Emotion & Commotion includes an instrumental version of the aria where the guitar takes the place of the human voice to an orchestral accompaniment.
- Nathan Pacheco sang the aria with the Tabernacle Choir during the Pioneer Day Concert at the LDS Conference Center on 19 July 2013.
- Andrea Bocelli sang the aria during celebrations for Leicester City F.C.'s Premier League title win in 2016. Bocelli said he approached the team's manager, fellow Italian Claudio Ranieri, and asked to perform at the King Power Stadium, calling Leicester's unlikely victory "a lesson in life". He also sang the aria at the 2026 Milano Cortina Winter Olympics opening ceremony.
- HNK Rijeka celebrated their Croatian Football League title wins with Nessun dorma in 2017 and 2025.
- Jennifer Hudson sang the aria with the New York Philharmonic at the WE LOVE NYC: The Homecoming Concert special event in Central Park on 21 August 2021.

=== In other media and popular culture ===
"Nessun dorma" is featured prominently in various films, including Yes, Giorgio (1982), The Killing Fields (1984), Aria (1987), New York Stories (1989), The Mirror Has Two Faces (1996), Bend It Like Beckham (2002), The Sum of All Fears (also 2002), Chasing Liberty (2004), The Sea Inside (also 2004), No Reservations (2007), Goon (2011), Mission: Impossible – Rogue Nation (2015), Sing (2016), The Upside (2017), Solo Mio and Daffy Season (both 2026).

"Nessun dorma" is also the name of a football podcast (hosted by The Guardian journalist Lee Calvert) that celebrates 1980s and 1990s football.

In 2019, JR East used "Nessun dorma" as a departure melody at Ueno station for a month.
