= Because (Guy d'Hardelot and Edward Teschemacher song) =

1900 song

"Because" ("Parce Que") is a song with music and lyrics by Guy d'Hardelot and English lyrics by Edward Teschemacher, originally published in 1902.

== Lyrics ==
The song's English lyrics by Edward Teschemacher and the original French lyrics are as follows:

Because, you come to me,
with naught save love,
and hold my hand and lift mine eyes above,
a wider world of hope and joy I see,
because you come to me!

Because you speak to me in accent sweet,
I find the roses waking 'round my feet,
and I am led through tears and joy to thee,
because you speak to me!

Because God made thee mine, I'll cherish thee!
Through light and darkness through all time to be,
and pray His love may make our love divine;
because God made thee mine!

Quand j’entends tes pas
Comme en un rêve
La folle espoir de te revoir s’élève
Et vainement vers toi je tends le bras
Quand j’entends tes pas

Et quand divinement ta voix m’enchaine
Je vois s’évanouir tout ma peine
Et tout ton être chante et vive en moi
Quand j’entends ta voix

Et puis tu viens à moi et je frissonne
Tu prends ma main et tout mon cœur se donne
A toi en un baiser brûlant d’émoi
Quand j’entends ta voix

== Notable recordings ==
- Tenor Enrico Caruso recorded the song in its original French on December 7, 1912. The record was issued by Victor in the USA, and in Europe by His Master's Voice, 1913.

A recording made on December 2, 1947 by RCA Victor was a hit for Perry Como in the spring of 1948. It was released on singles as follows:

- In the United States, by RCA Victor, on 78 rpm (catalog number 20-2653-A) with the flip side "If You Had All the World and Its Gold." This single was released in 1949 as a 45 rpm record (catalog number 47-2728)
- Also in the US, by RCA Victor on 78 rpm (catalog number 20-3299-A), with the flip side a re-release of "Till the End of Time". This single was released in 1949 as a 45 rpm record (catalog number 47-2887).
- In the United Kingdom, by the His Master's Voice, as a 78 rpm single (catalog BD-1215), in October 1948. The flip side was "It Only Happens When I Dance with You".

The Como recording first entered the U.S. charts on March 13, 1948, and ultimately reached No. 4 on the chart.

The song was also sung by Mario Lanza in the 1951 biopic The Great Caruso. Lanza recorded it for RCA Victor. His recording was issued as a single and it reached No. 16 on the Billboard chart.

== Recorded versions ==
- Jussi Björling
- Andrea Bocelli
- Joseph Calleja
- José Carreras
- Enrico Caruso
- Perry Como
- Franco Corelli
- Jesse Crawford
- Richard Crooks
- Bing Crosby recorded the song in 1956 for use on his radio show, and it was subsequently issued on his album On the Sentimental Side (1962).
- Plácido Domingo
- Deanna Durbin
- Nelson Eddy
- Lesley Garrett
- Kenneth W. Griffin
- Haydn Quartet
- Roy Hamilton
- Mahalia Jackson
- Buddy Johnson - reached Billboard R&B charts in March 1950
- Frankie Laine
- Mario Lanza - this reached the Billboard charts in 1951, peaking at the No. 16 position during a 14-week stay.
- John McCormack
- Vaughn Monroe
- Jan Peerce
- The Sandpebbles
- Keely Smith - included in her album Because You're Mine (1962).
- Richard Tauber
- The Three Tenors
- Eva Turner
- Jerry Vale - included in his album Be My Love (1964).
- Sarah Vaughan
- Billy Vaughn
- Evan Williams - very popular in 1910.
- Constance Novis - soprano and actress performs it in episode 2 of season 1 of Jeeves and Wooster (1990).
