= Tibor Rudas =

Hungarian record producer (1920–2014)

Tibor Rudas (6 February 1920 – 8 September 2014), was a Hungarian-born American entrepreneur, known for conceptualizing Luciano Pavarotti performances in sports arena settings and later signing the "Three Tenors" José Carreras, Plácido Domingo and Pavarotti to appear in a series of worldwide arena concerts.

== Biography ==
Born in Budapest, he was imprisoned in the Bergen-Belsen concentration camp during World War II by the Nazis. Prior to his work with Pavarotti, Rudas was active in Atlantic City, New Jersey, booking acts for the Superstar Theater and the Steel Pier. He died in Santa Monica, California, aged 94.
