= Guy d'Hardelot =

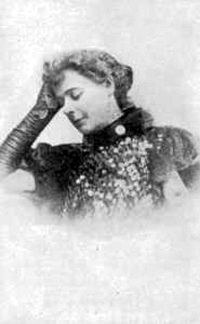
Guy d'Hardelot (Helen Guy Rhodes)

Guy d'Hardelot (August 1858 – 7 January 1936) was the pen name of Helen Rhodes (née Helen Guy), a French composer, pianist and teacher.

== Biography ==
D'Hardelot was born Helen Guy, to an English father and a French mother, at Château d'Hardelot, near Boulogne-sur-Mer.

At the age of 15, she went to Paris, where she studied at the Conservatoire de Paris under Marie Renaud-Maury (1852-1928) and came to the notice of Charles Gounod and Victor Maurel, who were much impressed with her ability. She also met Jules Massenet, who encouraged her to compose. On coming to London, she became a pupil of Clarence Lucas. Emma Calvé was a good friend to d'Hardelot and did much to bring her songs to notice.

Most of her life, d'Hardelot was engaged in teaching singing and diction at her home in London and many of her pupils attained success. In 1896, she toured the United States with Calvé. Her first real success as a composer was won with "Because", though her song "Sans Toi" had previously been favorably received. Among her other successes were "I Know a Lovely Garden", "I Think", "I Hid My Love", "Dawn" and "A Bunch of Violets".

She was singularly successful as a writer of songs, in which she combined French delicacy with English solidity. Few women composers became more popular in the early 20th century than did d'Hardelot, and her success was won on merit alone. In spite of the help of many friends, it was some time before she achieved this success.

Her sister, Edith Dick, was also a composer.
