= The Three Tenors =

Operatic singing group (1990–2003)

The Three Tenors were an operatic singing trio, termed a supergroup (a title normally reserved for popular music genre groups), active between 1990 and 2003 and consisting of Italian Luciano Pavarotti and Spaniards Plácido Domingo and José Carreras. The trio began their collaboration with a performance at the ancient Baths of Caracalla in Rome, Italy, on 7 July 1990, the eve of the 1990 FIFA World Cup final, watched by a television audience of around 800 million. According to the FIFA, the image of three tenors in formal evening dress singing in a World Cup concert captivated the audience. The recording of this debut concert became the best-selling classical album of all time and led to additional performances and live albums. They performed to television audiences at three further World Cup Finals: 1994 in Los Angeles, 1998 in Paris, and 2002 in Yokohama. They also toured other cities around the world, usually performing in stadiums or similar large arenas to huge audiences. They last performed together at Schottenstein Center in Columbus, Ohio, on 28 September 2003.

The Three Tenors' repertoire ranged from opera to Broadway to Neapolitan songs and pop hits. The group's signature songs included "Nessun dorma" from Puccini's opera Turandot, usually sung by Pavarotti, and the song "'O sole mio", which all three tenors typically sang together.

== History ==
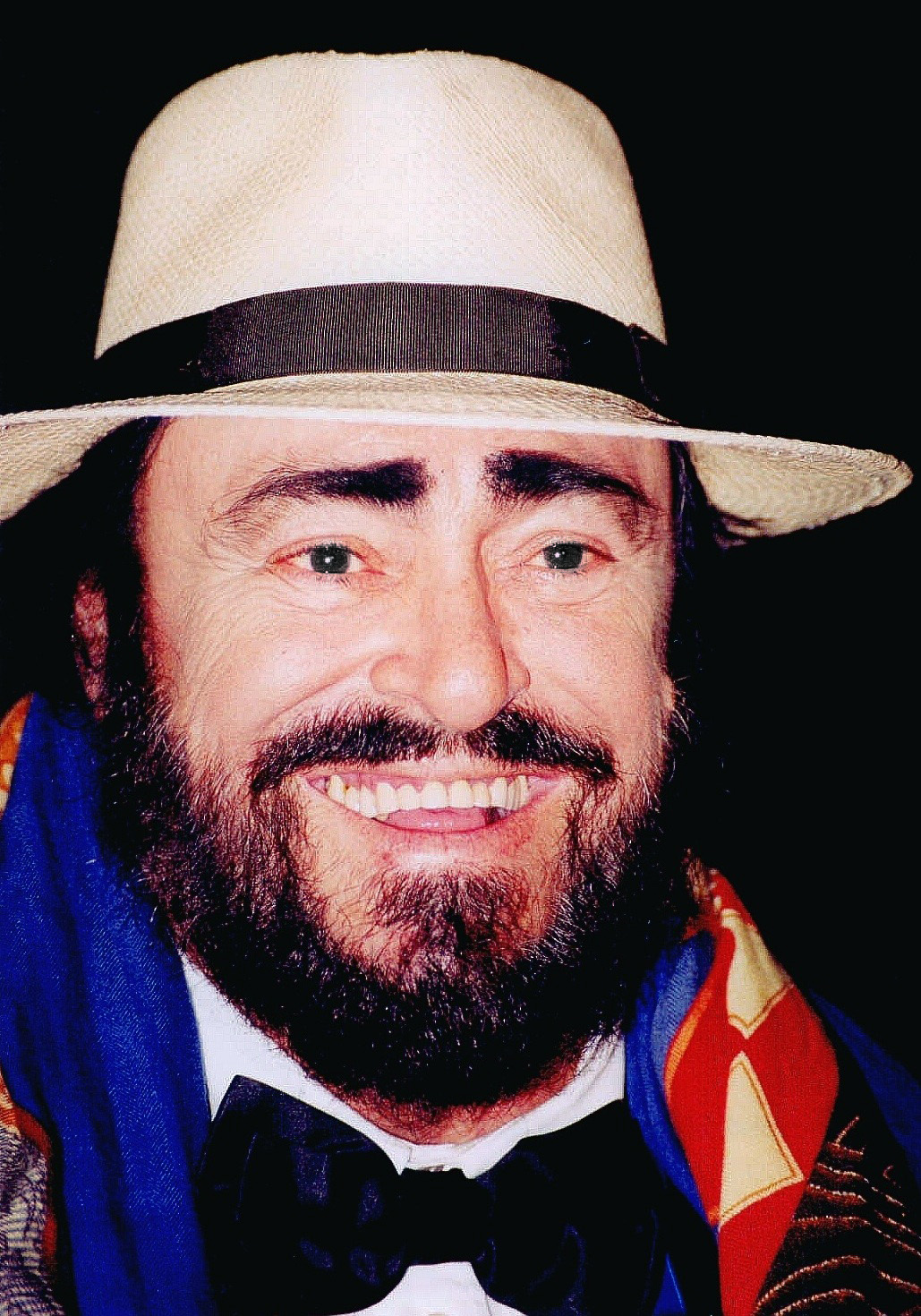
Luciano Pavarotti

Luciano is a born communicator, one of the most charismatic figures I have ever seen on stage. He only opens his mouth and with the first note, he gets the audience. It is something he was born with. Placido is the most complete artist I have ever seen on stage. There is the quality of his acting besides his great vocal skills and achievement. For me – a tenor lover – it is a great honor and privilege to sing with them. They are two great guys and very high humans.

— José Carreras on his Three Tenor colleagues in a December 2000 interview

Italian producer Mario Dradi, along with German producer Elmar Kruse and British composer and producer Herbert Chappell, conceived the idea of the first concert in 1990 in Rome. It was held to raise money for Carreras's foundation, the José Carreras International Leukemia Foundation. It was also a way for his friends Domingo and Pavarotti to welcome Carreras back into the world of opera after undergoing successful treatment for leukemia. The Three Tenors first performed in a concert for the 1990 FIFA World Cup. Zubin Mehta conducted the orchestra of Maggio Musicale Fiorentino and the orchestra of Teatro dell'Opera di Roma. According to the FIFA, the performance captivated audiences. A filmed version of the concert was produced by Herbert Chappell and Gian Carlo Bertelli for Decca and became the highest-selling classical disc in history.

The three subsequently sang together in concerts produced by Hungarian Tibor Rudas and other producers, at Dodger Stadium in Los Angeles to coincide the final match of the 1994 FIFA World Cup, at the Champ de Mars under the Eiffel Tower during the 1998 FIFA World Cup, and in Yokohama for the 2002 FIFA World Cup. Nearly 50,000 people attended their 1994 concert at Dodger Stadium and around 1.3 billion viewers watched it.

Following the big success of the 1990 and 1994 concerts, The Three Tenors opened a world tour of concerts during 1996–1997. In 1996 they performed at Kasumigaoka Stadium in Tokyo, at Wembley Stadium in London, at Ernst Happel Stadion in Vienna, at Giants Stadium outside of New York City, at Ullevi Stadium in Gothenburg, Sweden, at Olympic Stadium in Munich, at Rheinstadion in Düsseldorf and at BC Place in Vancouver on New Year's Eve. In 1997 concerts followed at the Melbourne Cricket Ground, at Skydome in Toronto, at Pro Player Stadium in Miami and at Camp Nou in Barcelona. The tour was scheduled to end in Houston with a final concert which was eventually canceled due to very low ticket sales. In addition to their 1996–1997 world tour, The Three Tenors also performed two benefit concerts – one in Pavarotti's hometown Modena in the summer of 1997 and one in Domingo's home town Madrid in the following winter – in order to raise money for the rebuilding of the Teatro La Fenice in Venice and the Gran Teatre del Liceu in Barcelona and for the Queen Sofia Foundation.

A second series of concerts outside of the FIFA World Cup events held again in 1999 including cities like Tokyo, Pretoria and Detroit followed by a Christmas concert in Vienna in December the same year. In 2000 the Three Tenors toured again performing live in San Jose, California, Las Vegas, Washington, D.C., Cleveland and São Paulo. However, the production had to cancel two planned concerts for this tour; one in Hamburg on 16 June due to difficulties in finding a suitable orchestra and conductor, and another one in Albany, New York, on 22 July due to poor ticket sales. The later one was replaced by the Brazilian concert in São Paulo. One more benefit concert was given by The Three Tenors in December 2000 in Chicago to donate the AIDS Foundation of Chicago. In 2001 two more concerts were given in Asia: one in Seoul and one in Beijing inside the walls of the Forbidden City. Finally in 2003 they performed in Bath at the Royal Crescent and later in September the same year they gave their last Three Tenors' concert, which took place at the Schottenstein Center in Columbus, Ohio. A Three Tenors reunion concert was scheduled to take place on 4 June 2005 at the Parque Fundidora in Monterrey, Mexico, but because of Pavarotti's health problems, he was replaced by Mexican pop singer Alejandro Fernández.

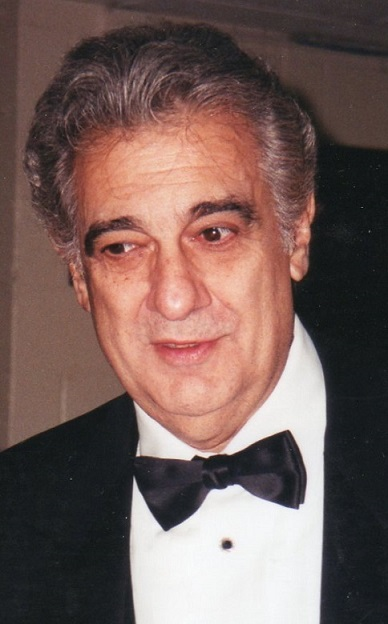
Plácido Domingo

== Recordings ==
The concerts were a huge commercial success, and were accompanied by a series of best-selling recordings, including the original Carreras-Domingo-Pavarotti in Concert, subsequently reissued as The Three Tenors In Concert (which holds the Guinness World Record for the best-selling classical music album), The Three Tenors in Concert 1994, The Three Tenors: Paris 1998, The Three Tenors Christmas and The Best of The Three Tenors. (A DVD of The Three Tenors in Bath was issued solely as a corporate gift.) Zubin Mehta conducted the performances in 1990 and 1994. The Paris concert was conducted by James Levine.

Carreras and Domingo have appeared together on a number of other albums including Gala Lirica (with various other artists), Christmas In Vienna (with Diana Ross), and Christmas in Moscow (with Sissel Kyrkjebø).

== Royalties ==
For their initial appearance together in Rome in 1990, Carreras, Domingo, and Pavarotti agreed to accept relatively small flat fees for the recording rights to their concert, which they then donated to charity. Their album unexpectedly reaped millions in profits for Decca Records, causing some resentment on the part of the tenors, who officially received no royalty payments. As reported in the press, Domingo suspected that the record company paid Pavarotti on the side, in order to keep one of their top contracted artists content. Pavarotti denied this, insisting: "We got nothing." Years later his former agent and manager Herbert Breslin wrote that Pavarotti had indeed secretly received $1.5 million that the other two tenors, who were not under contract to Decca, did not receive. For subsequent concerts and recordings, the singers were much more careful in assuring financially advantageous contractual terms for themselves.

== Criticism ==
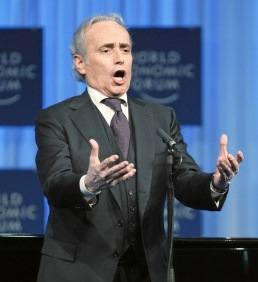
José Carreras

While the Three Tenors were applauded by many for introducing opera to a wider audience, some opera purists criticised the group. Domingo responded to critics in a 1998 interview: "The purists, they say this is not opera. Of course it's not opera, it doesn't pretend to be an opera. It's a concert in which we sing some opera, we sing some songs, we do some zarzuela, then we do a medley of songs ... We respect very much when people criticise it. That's fine. They shouldn't come ... But they should leave the people who are coming and are happy."

Other critics such as Martin Bernheimer complained that the tenors performed for excessive financial remuneration, rather than art. On their first worldwide tour, each tenor received around one million dollars per concert – unheard of for classical musicians. In a joint interview with his colleagues, Pavarotti responded to complaints about their incomes: "We make the money we deserve. We're not forcing someone to pay us." Domingo added about the world of opera: "I am giving 17 performances in 25 days. Ask me how much I get for that ... For 30 years we have given in blood the best of our lives and our careers. You think we don't deserve money?" Carreras, for his part, stressed how little they made compared to many athletes, pop singers, and movie stars.

== Legal issues ==
The success of the Three Tenors led to antitrust action by the U.S. Federal Trade Commission against Warner Bros. and Vivendi Universal. It found that they had conspired not to advertise or discount the albums of the Rome concert (released by PolyGram, later taken over by Vivendi) and of the Los Angeles concert (released by Warner Bros.) in order to protect sales of the jointly released album of the 1998 Paris concert.

The Three Tenors also encountered trouble with the German government. In 1999, two of the three singers paid an undisclosed fine to the German government as part of an out-of-court settlement for tax evasion. In addition, the German government accused the tenors of owing large back-taxes. Their concert organizer and promoter, Matthias Hoffmann, who was in charge of their taxes at the time, was sentenced to jail time for his role in the alleged tax evasion.

== In popular culture ==
- Throughout the Seinfeld episode "The Doll", José Carreras is repeatedly referred to as "the other guy", while the names of Domingo and Pavarotti are easily recalled.
- The Animaniacs episode "Three Tenors and You're Out" featured a parody of the trio performing at Dodger Stadium.
- The Canadian sketch comedy series Royal Canadian Air Farce parodied The Three Tenors in a sketch.
- In Encore! Encore!, Nathan Lane plays an opera singer who was to become "the Fourth Tenor" before injuring his voice.
- The trio was featured on the MTV animated show Celebrity Deathmatch, in a match against The Three Stooges.
- In the Japanese version of Yu-Gi-Oh! 5D's, The Three Emperors of Yliaster are named after the Three Tenors.

== List of concerts ==
List of The Three Tenors concerts
Nr.	City, country	Venue	Event	Conductor	Date
1	Rome, Italy	Baths of Caracalla	1990 FIFA World Cup	Zubin Mehta	7 July 1990
2	Monte Carlo, Monaco	Opéra de Monte-Carlo	Benefit concert	Zubin Mehta	9 June 1994
3	Los Angeles, United States	Dodger Stadium	1994 FIFA World Cup	Zubin Mehta	16 July 1994
4	Tokyo, Japan	National Stadium	World Tour	James Levine	29 June 1996
5	London, United Kingdom	Wembley Stadium	World Tour	James Levine	6 July 1996
6	Vienna, Austria	Ernst Happel Stadion	World Tour	James Levine	13 July 1996
7	East Rutherford, United States	Giants Stadium	World Tour	James Levine	20 July 1996
8	Gothenburg, Sweden	Ullevi Stadium	World Tour	James Levine	26 July 1996
9	Munich, Germany	Olympiastadion	World Tour	James Levine	3 August 1996
10	Düsseldorf, Germany	Rheinstadion	World Tour	James Levine	24 August 1996
11	Vancouver, Canada	BC Place	World Tour	James Levine	31 December 1996
12	Toronto, Canada	SkyDome	World Tour	James Levine	4 January 1997
13	Melbourne, Australia	Melbourne Cricket Ground	World Tour	Marco Armiliato	1 March 1997
14	Miami, United States	Pro Player Stadium	World Tour	James Levine	8 March 1997
15	Modena, Italy	Stadio Alberto Braglia	Benefit concert	James Levine	17 June 1997
16	Barcelona, Spain	Camp Nou	World Tour	James Levine	13 July 1997
17	Madrid, Spain	Teatro Real	Benefit concert	Marco Armiliato	8 January 1998
18	Paris, France	Champ de Mars	1998 FIFA World Cup	James Levine	10 July 1998
19	Tokyo, Japan	Tokyo Dome	World Tour	James Levine	9 January 1999
20	Pretoria, South Africa	Union Buildings	World Tour	Marco Armiliato	18 April 1999
21	Detroit, United States	Tiger Stadium	World Tour	James Levine	17 July 1999
22	Vienna, Austria	Konzerthaus	Christmas concert	Steven Mercurio	23 December 1999
23	San Jose, United States	San Jose Arena	World Tour	Marco Armiliato	29 December 1999
24	Las Vegas, United States	Mandalay Bay Events Center	World Tour	Marco Armiliato	22 April 2000
25	Washington, D.C., United States	MCI Center	World Tour	James Levine	7 May 2000
26	Cleveland, United States	Browns Stadium	World Tour	Marco Armiliato	25 June 2000
27	São Paulo, Brazil	Estádio do Morumbi	World Tour	Marco Armiliato	22 July 2000
28	Chicago, United States	United Center	Benefit concert	János Ács	17 December 2000
29	Seoul, Korea	Jamsil Olympic Stadium	World Tour	János Ács	22 June 2001
30	Beijing, China	Forbidden City	World Tour	János Ács	23 June 2001
31	Yokohama, Japan	Yokohama Arena	2002 FIFA World Cup	János Ács	27 June 2002
32	Saint Paul, United States	Xcel Energy Center	World Tour	János Ács	16 December 2002
33	Bath, United Kingdom	Royal Crescent	World Tour	János Ács	7 August 2003
34	Columbus, United States	Schottenstein Center	World Tour	János Ács	28 September 2003

== Discography ==
Title	Album details	Conductor, Ensemble, Performance information	Peak chart positions							Certifications
Title	Album details	Conductor, Ensemble, Performance information	ITA	SPA	AUS	NLD	SWE	UK	US	Certifications
Carreras Domingo Pavarotti in Concert	Released: 1990; Label: Decca; Grammy Award and nominations; Brit Award	Zubin Mehta; Maggio Musicale Fiorentino Orchestra; Orchestra del Teatro Municipal di Roma (7 July 1990, Terme di Caracalla, Rome)	1	1	1	1	7	1	35	AUS: 6× Platinum; US: 3× Platinum; UK: 5× Platinum; CAN: 3× Platinum; GER: Platinum; AUT: 2× Platinum; MEX: Gold; BRA: 2× Platinum
The Three Tenors in Concert 1994	Released: 1994; Label: Atlantic / WEA / MV; 2 Grammy nominations; Gramophone Award	Zubin Mehta; Los Angeles Philharmonic Orchestra (16 August 1994, Dodger Stadium, Los Angeles)	2	1	1	2	1	1	4	US: Platinum; UK: 2× Platinum; CAN: 2× Platinum; GER: 3× Gold; CHE: Platinum; FRA: Platinum; AUT: 2× Platinum; AUS: Platinum
The Three Tenors: Paris 1998	Released: 1998; Label: Atlantic / Wea	James Levine (10 July 1998, Eiffel Tower, Paris)	23	–	16	27	39	14	83	US: Gold; UK: Silver; FRA: Gold; AUT: Gold; CHE: Gold
The 3 Tenors Christmas	Released: 2000; Label: Sony (SK 89131)	Steven Mercurio; Vienna Symphony Orchestra (23 December 1999, Vienna)	47	–	50	19	59	57	54	US: Gold; UK: Silver; GER: Gold

== Filmography ==
Title	Album details	Conductor, Ensemble, Performance information	Certifications
Carreras Domingo Pavarotti in Concert	Released: 1990; Format: VHS / DVD	Zubin Mehta; Maggio Musicale Fiorentino Orchestra; Orchestra del Teatro Municipal di Roma (7 August 1990, Terme di Caracalla, Rome)	US: 5× Platinum; CAN: 4× Platinum; GER: Platinum
The Three Tenors in Concert 1994	Released: 1994; Label: Warner Music; Format: VHS / DVD	Zubin Mehta; Los Angeles Philharmonic Orchestra (16 August 1994, Dodger Stadium, Los Angeles)	US: 5× Platinum; UK: 2× Platinum
The Vision: The Making of the 'Three Tenors in Concert'	Released: 1995; Label: Warner Music (VHS) / Kultur (DVD); Format: VHS / DVD (as an extra feature)		
The Three Tenors: Paris 1998	Released: 1998; Label: Universal Music / Decca; Format: VHS / DVD	James Levine (10 July 1998, Eiffel Tower, Paris)	US: Gold; UK: Gold; FRA: Platinum
The 3 Tenors Christmas	Released: 2000; Format: VHS / DVD	Steven Mercurio; Vienna Symphony Orchestra (23 December 1999, Vienna)	
